= Swiss Federal Council election =

The Swiss Federal Council is elected by the 246 members of the Federal Assembly of Switzerland by secret ballot. Regular elections take place every four years, in the first session following the Swiss federal elections. Additionally, an election is held to replace Federal Councillors who have announced their retirement or who have died in office.

The procedure of the election is guided both by legal requirements set down in the Swiss Constitution, and by informal understandings between the major parties, such as the magic formula which describes a long-standing Concordance system in which the four major Swiss parties, the Free Democratic Party, the Christian Democratic People's Party, the Swiss People's Party and the Social Democratic Party, mutually concede the right to a representation in the Federal Council roughly corresponding to each party's ballot in the general election.

The legal requirements for the election are as in article 175 of the constitution and in articles 132f of the parliamentary law of 2003.

It is customary to confirm sitting councillors seeking re-election. Non-reelection of a candidate has occurred only four times in the history of the Swiss federal state, twice in the 19th century (Ulrich Ochsenbein 1854, Jean-Jacques Challet-Venel 1872) and twice in the 21st (Ruth Metzler-Arnold 2003, Christoph Blocher 2007).

Councillors once elected have the right to serve their term and there is no mechanism by which the parliament could enforce their retirement. Each of the seven seats is subject to an individual election, held in sequence of seniority. It is customary for the major parties to nominate candidates, but these are not legally binding on the Assembly. Especially when there are several vacancies to be filled, the individual factions tend to honour these nominations in order to increase the likelihood of their own nominations being honoured. There have still been many cases where such candidacies have been ignored, with another, non-nominated member of the same party elected instead.

Since 1999, the constitution requires that the Federal Council duly represents all regions and linguistic groups. Prior to 1999, it was merely required that only one Councillor from any given canton may hold office at any time.

Beyond the legal requirements, there are a number of long-standing traditions in the composition of the council: The Federal Council never consisted of German-speaking members only, in spite of the Swiss German cantons recruiting a clear majority of the Federal Assembly. Councillors from the German-speaking cantons have, however, always been in the majority, usually in a 4:3 or 5:2 ratio. A majority of six German-speaking Councillors occurred only once, in the 1876 to 1880 term. The "Stammlande" principle traditionally elected only Councillors whose party held a majority in their own canton of origin.

There have been repeated attempts to reform the system of election to one of direct popular election. A popular initiative to this effect was repudiated in 1900 and again in 1942. The main argument against a popular election is the problematic balance of linguistic and regional minorities. A pure plurality voting system would likely result in a Federal Council composed exclusively of representatives of the urban, German-speaking cantons, which account for a majority of the Swiss population.

== Individual elections ==
year	date	newly elected	regular term	predecessor(s)	notes
1848	16 November	Ulrich Ochsenbein, Jonas Furrer, Martin J. Munzinger, Henri Druey, Friedrich Frey-Herosé, Wilhelm Matthias Naeff and Stefano Franscini		–	first election following the foundation of the Swiss Confederacy as a federal state with the entering into force of the federal constitution on 12 September.
1854	6 December	Jakob Stämpfli		Ulrich Ochsenbein	non-reelection of Ochsenbein
1855	11 July	Constant Fornerod		Henri Druey (died in office)	
1855	14 July	Josef Martin Knüsel		Martin J. Munzinger (died in office)	Knüsel was elected after Johann Jakob Stehlin refused to serve
1857	39 July	Giovanni Battista Pioda		Stefano Franscini (died in office)	
1861	30 July	Jakob Dubs		Jonas Furrer (died in office)	
1863	12 December	Karl Schenk		Jakob Stämpfli	
1864	12 July	Jean-Jacques Challet-Venel		Giovanni Battista Pioda	
1866	8 December	Emil Welti		Friedrich Frey-Herosé	
1867	6 December	Victor Ruffy		Constant Fornerod	
1870	1 February	Paul Cérésole		Victor Ruffy (died in office)	
1872	12 July	Eugène Borel, Johann Jakob Scherer		Jean-Jacques Challet-Venel	non-reelection of Challet-Venel
1875	10 December	Bernhard Hammer, Numa Droz, Fridolin Anderwert, Joachim Heer		Eugène Borel, Paul Cérésole, Wilhelm Matthias Naeff, Josef Martin Knüsel	Droz was elected after Louis Ruchonnet and Charles Estoppey declined their election.
1878	10 December	Simeon Bavier		Joachim Heer	
1879	21 March	Wilhelm Friedrich Hertenstein		Johann Jakob Scherer	
1881	3 March	Louis Ruchonnet		Fridolin Anderwert (died in office)	Karl Hoffmann refused to serve
1883	10 April	Adolf Deucher		Simeon Bavier	
1888	13 December	Walter Hauser		Wilhelm Hertenstein (died in office)	
1890	11 December	Emil Frey		Bernhard Hammer	
1891	17 December	Josef Zemp		Emil Welti	Zemp as a member of the Swiss Conservative People's Party (the predecessor of the Christian Democratic People's Party of Switzerland) was the first councillor not of the Radical Party, beginning of the Swiss concordance system.
1892	15 December	Adrien Lachenal		Numa Droz	
1893	14 December	Eugène Ruffy		Louis Ruchonnet (died in office)	
1895	16 August	Eduard Müller		Karl Schenk (died in office)	
1897	25 March	Ernst Brenner		Emil Frey	
1899	14 December	Marc-Emile Ruchet, Robert Comtesse		Eugène Ruffy, Adrien Lachenal	
1902	11 December	Ludwig Forrer		Walter Hauser (died in office)	
1908	17 June	Josef Anton Schobinger		Josef Zemp	
1911	4 April	Arthur Hoffmann		Ernst Brenner (died in office)	
1911	14 December	Giuseppe Motta		Josef Anton Schobinger,	
1912	12 March	Louis Perrier		Robert Comtesse	
1912	17 July	Edmund Schulthess, Camille Decoppet		Adolf Deucher (died in office), Marc-Emile Ruchet	
1913	12 June	Felix-Louis Calonder		Louis Perrier	
1917	26 June	Gustave Ador		Arthur Hoffmann	Ador was the first, and to date only, councillor of the Liberal Party of Switzerland
1917	13 December	Robert Haab		Ludwig Forrer	
1919	11 December	Jean-Marie Musy, Ernest Chuard, Karl Scheurer		Gustave Ador, Camille Decoppet, Eduard Müller (died in office)	
1920	12 February	Heinrich Häberlin		Felix-Louis Calonder	
1928	13 December	Marcel Pilet-Golaz	1928 Swiss federal election	Ernest Chuard	
1929	12 December	Albert Meyer, Rudolf Minger		Robert Haab, Karl Scheurer (died in office)	Minger was the first representative of the Party of Farmers, Traders and Independents (BGB/PAI), the predecessor of the Swiss People's Party.
1931			1931 Swiss federal election		
1934	22 March	Johannes Baumann		Heinrich Häberlin	
1934	28 March	Philipp Etter		Jean-Marie Musy	
1935	4 April	Hermann Obrecht		Edmund Schulthess	
1938	15 December	Ernst Wetter		Albert Meyer	
1940	18 July	Walther Stampfli		Hermann Obrecht	
1940	10 December	Enrico Celio, Walther Stampfli, Eduard von Steiger, Karl Kobelt		Giuseppe Motta, Rudolf Minger, Johannes Baumann	
1943	15 December	Ernst Nobs		Ernst Wetter	First Councillor of the Social Democratic Party.
1944	14 December	Max Petitpierre		Marcel Pilet-Golaz	
1947	11 December	Rodolphe Rubattel	1947 Swiss federal election	Walther Stampfli	
1950	14 September	Joseph Escher		Enrico Celio	
1951	13 December	Markus Feldmann, Max Weber	1951 Swiss federal election		Eduard von Steiger, Ernst Nobs
1953	22 December	Hans Streuli		Max Weber	
1954	16 December	Thomas Holenstein, Paul Chaudet, Giuseppe Lepori		Karl Kobelt, Joseph Escher (died in office), Rodolphe Rubattel	
1955			1955 Swiss federal election		all sitting councillors confirmed
1958	11 December	Friedrich Traugott Wahlen		Markus Feldmann (died in office)	
1959	17 December	Jean Bourgknecht, Willy Spühler, Ludwig von Moos, Hans Peter Tschudi	1959 Swiss federal election	Philipp Etter, Hans Streuli, Thomas Holenstein, Giuseppe Lepori	beginning of the Zauberformel. Tschudi was elected instead of the nominated candidate Walther Bringolf.
1961	15 June	Hans Schaffner		Max Petitpierre	
1962	27 September	Roger Bonvin		Jean Bourgknecht	
1963			1963 Swiss federal election		all sitting councillors confirmed
1965	8 December	Rudolf Gnägi		Friedrich Traugott Wahlen	
1966	14 December	Nello Celio		Paul Chaudet	
1967			1967 Swiss federal election		all sitting councillors confirmed
1969	10 December	Ernst Brugger, Pierre Graber		Hans Schaffner, Willy Spühler	
1971	8 December	Kurt Furgler	1971 Swiss federal election	Ludwig von Moos	
1973	5 December	Willi Ritschard, Hans Hürlimann, Georges-André Chevallaz		Nello Celio, Roger Bonvin, Hans Peter Tschudi	
1975			1975 Swiss federal election		all sitting councillors confirmed
1977	7 December	Fritz Honegger, Pierre Aubert		Ernst Brugger, Pierre Graber	
1979	5 December	Leon Schlumpf	1979 Swiss federal election	Rudolf Gnägi	
1982	8 December	Alphons Egli, Rudolf Friedrich		Hans Hürlimann, Fritz Honegger	
1983	7 December	Otto Stich, Jean-Pascal Delamuraz	1983 Swiss federal election	Willi Ritschard (died in office), Georges-André Chevallaz	first female candidate (Lilian Uchtenhagen)
1984	2 October	Elisabeth Kopp		Rudolf Friedrich	first successful female candidate
1986	10 December	Flavio Cotti, Arnold Koller		Alphons Egli, Kurt Furgler	
1987	9 December	Adolf Ogi, René Felber	1987 Swiss federal election	Leon Schlumpf, Pierre Aubert	
1989	1 February	Kaspar Villiger		Elisabeth Kopp	Kopp was forced to resign after a political scandal.
1991			1991 Swiss federal election		all sitting councillors confirmed
1993	10 March	Ruth Dreifuss		René Felber	Francis Matthey was elected instead of the nominated Christiane Brunner. Matthey under pressure from his party refused to serve, after Dreifuss which was elected.
1995	27 September	Moritz Leuenberger	1995 Swiss federal election	Otto Stich	
1998	11 March	Pascal Couchepin		Jean-Pascal Delamuraz	
1999	11 March	Ruth Metzler-Arnold Joseph Deiss	1999 Swiss federal election	Arnold Koller Flavio Cotti	The council for the first time has two female members.
2000	6 December	Samuel Schmid		Adolf Ogi	
2002	4 December	Micheline Calmy-Rey		Ruth Dreifuss	
2003	10 December	Christoph Blocher	2003 Swiss federal election	Ruth Metzler-Arnold	non-reelection of Metzler-Arnold, end of the established Zauberformel and creation of a new one
2006	14 June	Doris Leuthard		Joseph Deiss	
2007	12 December	Eveline Widmer-Schlumpf	2007 Swiss federal election	Christoph Blocher	non-reelection of Blocher. The council for the first time includes three female members. New Zauberformel interrupted in 2008
2008	10 December	Ueli Maurer		Samuel Schmid	Maurer was behind Hansjörg Walter in the first two rounds and won 122:121 in the third.
2009	16 September	Didier Burkhalter		Pascal Couchepin	
2010	22 September	Simonetta Sommaruga, Johann Schneider-Ammann		Moritz Leuenberger, Hans-Rudolf Merz	historical first female majority in the council
2011	14 December	Alain Berset	2011 Swiss federal election	Micheline Calmy-Rey	
2015	9 December	Guy Parmelin	2015 Swiss federal election	Eveline Widmer-Schlumpf	New Zauberformel re-established.
2017	20 September	Ignazio Cassis		Didier Burkhalter	
2018	5 December	Viola Amherd, Karin Keller-Sutter		Doris Leuthard, Johann Schneider-Ammann	
2019			2019 Swiss federal election		all sitting councillors confirmed
2022	7 December	Albert Rösti, Élisabeth Baume-Schneider		Ueli Maurer, Simonetta Sommaruga	
2023	13 December	Beat Jans	2023 Swiss federal election	Alain Berset	

== See also ==
- List of members of the Swiss Federal Council
- List of members of the Swiss Federal Council by date
