= List of members of the Swiss Federal Council by date =

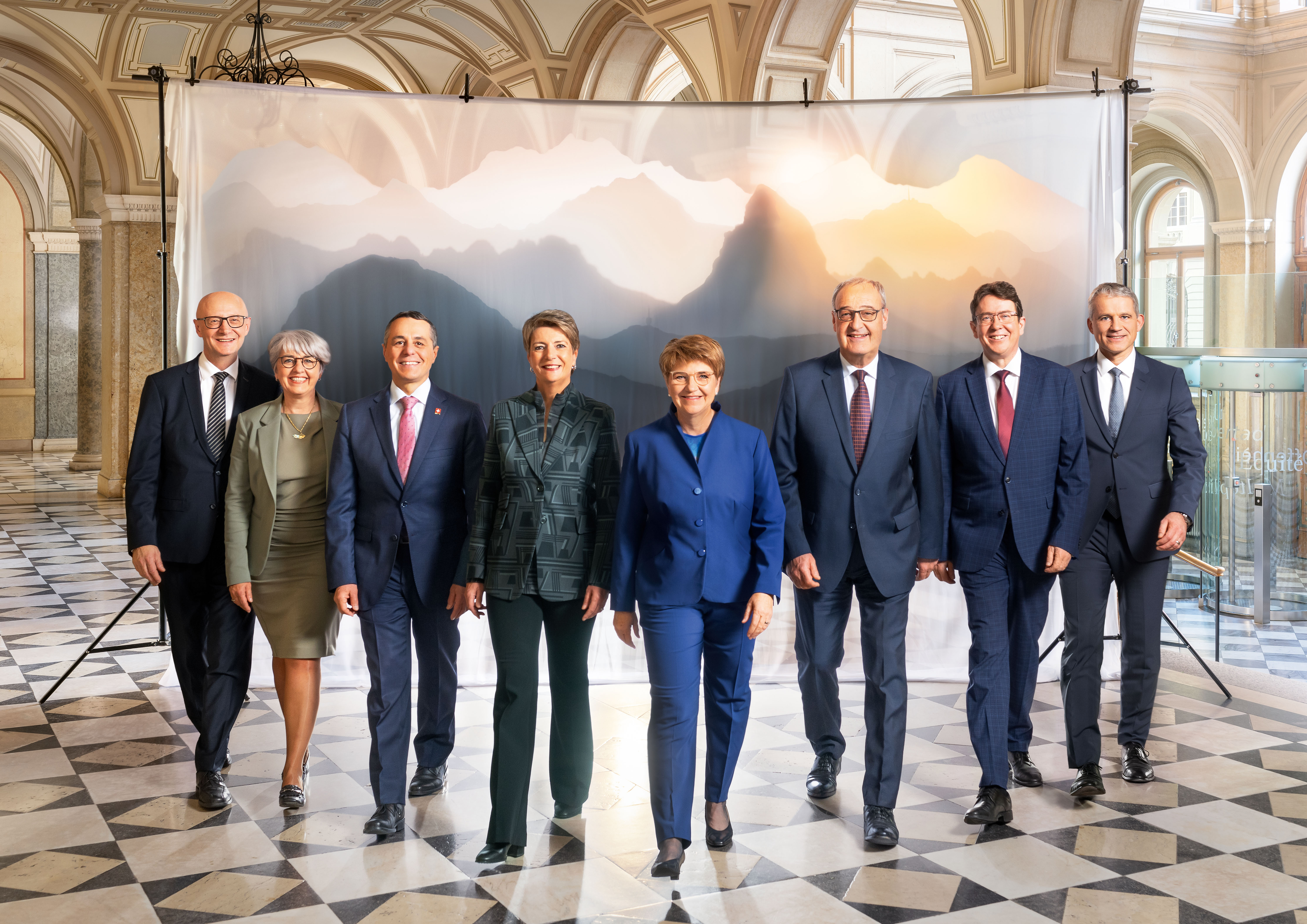
The Swiss Federal Council and the Federal Chancellor as of January 2024. From left to right: Viktor Rossi, Élisabeth Baume-Schneider, Ignazio Cassis, Karin Keller-Sutter, Viola Amherd, Guy Parmelin, Albert Rösti, and Beat Jans.

This is a list of members of the Swiss Federal Council, in chronological order and for any given year since inauguration of the Federal Council, from 1848 to present. Its seven members constitute the federal government of Switzerland and collectively serve as the country's head of state. Each of the seven Federal Councillors heads a department of the Swiss federal administration.

The members of the Federal Council are elected for a term of four years by both chambers of the federal parliament sitting together as the United Federal Assembly. Each Federal Councillor is elected individually by secret ballot by an absolute majority of votes. Once elected for a four-year-term, Federal Councillors can neither be voted out of office by a motion of no confidence nor can they be impeached. Reelection is possible for an indefinite number of terms. Parliament has decided not to reelect a sitting Federal Councillor only four times and only twice (in 2003 and 2007) since 1872. In practice, therefore, Federal Councillors serve until they decide to resign and retire to private life, usually after three to five terms of office.

== Chronological, global ==
Free Democratic Party (FDP/PRD)
Christian Democratic People's Party (CVP/PDC)
Liberal Party (LPS/PLS)
Swiss People's Party (SVP/UDC)
Social Democratic Party (SPS/PSS)
Conservative Democratic Party (BDP/PBD)
The Centre(Die Mitte/Le Centre)

Decade	First day in office	Federal Councillors						
1848	16 November 1848	Ulrich Ochsenbein	Jonas Furrer	Josef Munzinger	Henri Druey	Friedrich Frey-Herosé	Wilhelm Matthias Naeff	Stefano Franscini
1850s		Ulrich Ochsenbein	Jonas Furrer	Josef Munzinger	Henri Druey	Friedrich Frey-Herosé	Wilhelm Matthias Naeff	Stefano Franscini
1850s	31 December 1854	Jakob Stämpfli	Jonas Furrer	Josef Munzinger	Henri Druey	Friedrich Frey-Herosé	Wilhelm Matthias Naeff	Stefano Franscini
1850s	11 July 1855	Jakob Stämpfli	Jonas Furrer	Josef Munzinger	Constant Fornerod	Friedrich Frey-Herosé	Wilhelm Matthias Naeff	Stefano Franscini
1850s	14 July 1855	Jakob Stämpfli	Jonas Furrer	Melchior Josef Martin Knüsel	Constant Fornerod	Friedrich Frey-Herosé	Wilhelm Matthias Naeff	Stefano Franscini
1850s	30 July 1857	Jakob Stämpfli	Jonas Furrer	Melchior Josef Martin Knüsel	Constant Fornerod	Friedrich Frey-Herosé	Wilhelm Matthias Naeff	Giovanni Battista Pioda
1860s		Jakob Stämpfli	Jonas Furrer	Melchior Josef Martin Knüsel	Constant Fornerod	Friedrich Frey-Herosé	Wilhelm Matthias Naeff	Giovanni Battista Pioda
1860s	30 July 1861	Jakob Stämpfli	Jakob Dubs	Melchior Josef Martin Knüsel	Constant Fornerod	Friedrich Frey-Herosé	Wilhelm Matthias Naeff	Giovanni Battista Pioda
1860s	31 December 1863	Karl Schenk	Jakob Dubs	Melchior Josef Martin Knüsel	Constant Fornerod	Friedrich Frey-Herosé	Wilhelm Matthias Naeff	Giovanni Battista Pioda
1860s	12 July 1864	Karl Schenk	Jakob Dubs	Melchior Josef Martin Knüsel	Constant Fornerod	Friedrich Frey-Herosé	Wilhelm Matthias Naeff	Jean-Jacques Challet-Venel
1860s	31 December 1866	Karl Schenk	Jakob Dubs	Melchior Josef Martin Knüsel	Constant Fornerod	Emil Welti	Wilhelm Matthias Naeff	Jean-Jacques Challet-Venel
1860s	31 October 1867	Karl Schenk	Jakob Dubs	Melchior Josef Martin Knüsel	Victor Ruffy	Emil Welti	Wilhelm Matthias Naeff	Jean-Jacques Challet-Venel
1870s		Karl Schenk	Jakob Dubs	Melchior Josef Martin Knüsel	Victor Ruffy	Emil Welti	Wilhelm Matthias Naeff	Jean-Jacques Challet-Venel
1870s	1 February 1870	Karl Schenk	Jakob Dubs	Melchior Josef Martin Knüsel	Paul Cérésole	Emil Welti	Wilhelm Matthias Naeff	Jean-Jacques Challet-Venel
1870s	28 May 1872	Karl Schenk	Johann Jakob Scherer	Melchior Josef Martin Knüsel	Paul Cérésole	Emil Welti	Wilhelm Matthias Naeff	Jean-Jacques Challet-Venel
1870s	31 December 1872	Karl Schenk	Johann Jakob Scherer	Melchior Josef Martin Knüsel	Paul Cérésole	Emil Welti	Wilhelm Matthias Naeff	Eugène Borel
1870s	31 December 1875	Karl Schenk	Johann Jakob Scherer	Joachim Heer	Numa Droz	Emil Welti	Fridolin Anderwert	Bernhard Hammer
1870s	31 December 1878	Karl Schenk	Johann Jakob Scherer	Simeon Bavier	Numa Droz	Emil Welti	Fridolin Anderwert	Bernhard Hammer
1880s		Karl Schenk	Johann Jakob Scherer	Simeon Bavier	Numa Droz	Emil Welti	Fridolin Anderwert	Bernhard Hammer
1880s	3 March 1881	Karl Schenk	Johann Jakob Scherer	Simeon Bavier	Numa Droz	Emil Welti	Louis Ruchonnet	Bernhard Hammer
1880s	10 April 1883	Karl Schenk	Johann Jakob Scherer	Adolf Deucher	Numa Droz	Emil Welti	Louis Ruchonnet	Bernhard Hammer
1880s	13 December 1888	Karl Schenk	Wilhelm Friedrich Hertenstein	Adolf Deucher	Numa Droz	Emil Welti	Louis Ruchonnet	Bernhard Hammer
1890s		Karl Schenk	Wilhelm Friedrich Hertenstein	Adolf Deucher	Numa Droz	Emil Welti	Louis Ruchonnet	Bernhard Hammer
1890s	31 December 1890	Karl Schenk	Wilhelm Friedrich Hertenstein	Adolf Deucher	Numa Droz	Emil Welti	Louis Ruchonnet	Emil Frey
1890s	31 December 1891	Karl Schenk	Wilhelm Friedrich Hertenstein	Adolf Deucher	Numa Droz	Josef Zemp	Louis Ruchonnet	Emil Frey
1890s	31 December 1892	Karl Schenk	Wilhelm Friedrich Hertenstein	Adolf Deucher	Adrien Lachenal	Josef Zemp	Louis Ruchonnet	Emil Frey
1890s	14 December 1893	Karl Schenk	Wilhelm Friedrich Hertenstein	Adolf Deucher	Adrien Lachenal	Josef Zemp	Eugène Ruffy	Emil Frey
1890s	16 August 1895	Eduard Müller	Walter Hauser	Adolf Deucher	Adrien Lachenal	Josef Zemp	Eugène Ruffy	Emil Frey
1890s	31 March 1897	Eduard Müller	Walter Hauser	Adolf Deucher	Adrien Lachenal	Josef Zemp	Eugène Ruffy	Ernst Brenner
1890s	14 December 1899	Eduard Müller	Walter Hauser	Adolf Deucher	Adrien Lachenal	Josef Zemp	Marc-Emile Ruchet	Ernst Brenner
1900s	31 December 1899	Eduard Müller	Walter Hauser	Adolf Deucher	Robert Comtesse	Josef Zemp	Marc-Emile Ruchet	Ernst Brenner
1900s	11 December 1902	Eduard Müller	Ludwig Forrer	Adolf Deucher	Robert Comtesse	Josef Zemp	Marc-Emile Ruchet	Ernst Brenner
1900s	17 June 1908	Eduard Müller	Ludwig Forrer	Adolf Deucher	Robert Comtesse	Josef Anton Schobinger	Marc-Emile Ruchet	Ernst Brenner
1910s		Eduard Müller	Ludwig Forrer	Adolf Deucher	Robert Comtesse	Josef Anton Schobinger	Marc-Emile Ruchet	Ernst Brenner
1910s	4 April 1911	Eduard Müller	Ludwig Forrer	Adolf Deucher	Robert Comtesse	Josef Anton Schobinger	Marc-Emile Ruchet	Arthur Hoffmann
1910s	14 December 1911	Eduard Müller	Ludwig Forrer	Adolf Deucher	Robert Comtesse	Giuseppe Motta	Marc-Emile Ruchet	Arthur Hoffmann
1910s	12 March 1912	Eduard Müller	Ludwig Forrer	Adolf Deucher	Louis Perrier	Giuseppe Motta	Marc-Emile Ruchet	Arthur Hoffmann
1910s	17 July 1912	Eduard Müller	Ludwig Forrer	Edmund Schulthess	Louis Perrier	Giuseppe Motta	Camille Decoppet	Arthur Hoffmann
1910s	12 June 1913	Eduard Müller	Ludwig Forrer	Edmund Schulthess	Felix-Louis Calonder	Giuseppe Motta	Camille Decoppet	Arthur Hoffmann
1910s	26 June 1917	Eduard Müller	Ludwig Forrer	Edmund Schulthess	Felix-Louis Calonder	Giuseppe Motta	Camille Decoppet	Gustave Ador
1910s	31 December 1917	Eduard Müller	Robert Haab	Edmund Schulthess	Felix-Louis Calonder	Giuseppe Motta	Camille Decoppet	Gustave Ador
1910s	11 December 1919	Karl Scheurer	Robert Haab	Edmund Schulthess	Felix-Louis Calonder	Giuseppe Motta	Camille Decoppet	Gustave Ador
1910s	31 December 1919	Karl Scheurer	Robert Haab	Edmund Schulthess	Felix-Louis Calonder	Giuseppe Motta	Ernest Chuard	Jean-Marie Musy
1920s		Karl Scheurer	Robert Haab	Edmund Schulthess	Felix-Louis Calonder	Giuseppe Motta	Ernest Chuard	Jean-Marie Musy
1920s	12 February 1920	Karl Scheurer	Robert Haab	Edmund Schulthess	Heinrich Häberlin	Giuseppe Motta	Ernest Chuard	Jean-Marie Musy
1920s	31 December 1928	Karl Scheurer	Robert Haab	Edmund Schulthess	Heinrich Häberlin	Giuseppe Motta	Marcel Pilet-Golaz	Jean-Marie Musy
1920s	12 December 1929	Rudolf Minger	Albert Meyer	Edmund Schulthess	Heinrich Häberlin	Giuseppe Motta	Marcel Pilet-Golaz	Jean-Marie Musy
1930s		Rudolf Minger	Albert Meyer	Edmund Schulthess	Heinrich Häberlin	Giuseppe Motta	Marcel Pilet-Golaz	Jean-Marie Musy
1930s	30 April 1934	Rudolf Minger	Albert Meyer	Edmund Schulthess	Johannes Baumann	Giuseppe Motta	Marcel Pilet-Golaz	Philipp Etter
1930s	15 April 1935	Rudolf Minger	Albert Meyer	Hermann Obrecht	Johannes Baumann	Giuseppe Motta	Marcel Pilet-Golaz	Philipp Etter
1930s	31 December 1938	Rudolf Minger	Ernst Wetter	Hermann Obrecht	Johannes Baumann	Giuseppe Motta	Marcel Pilet-Golaz	Philipp Etter
1940s		Rudolf Minger	Ernst Wetter	Hermann Obrecht	Johannes Baumann	Giuseppe Motta	Marcel Pilet-Golaz	Philipp Etter
1940s	22 February 1940	Rudolf Minger	Ernst Wetter	Hermann Obrecht	Johannes Baumann	Enrico Celio	Marcel Pilet-Golaz	Philipp Etter
1940s	31 July 1940	Rudolf Minger	Ernst Wetter	Hermann Obrecht	Johannes Baumann	Enrico Celio	Marcel Pilet-Golaz	Philipp Etter
1940s	10 December 1940	Eduard von Steiger	Ernst Wetter	Walther Stampfli	Johannes Baumann	Enrico Celio	Marcel Pilet-Golaz	Philipp Etter
1940s	31 December 1940	Eduard von Steiger	Ernst Wetter	Walther Stampfli	Karl Kobelt	Enrico Celio	Marcel Pilet-Golaz	Philipp Etter
1940s	31 December 1943	Eduard von Steiger	Ernst Nobs	Walther Stampfli	Karl Kobelt	Enrico Celio	Marcel Pilet-Golaz	Philipp Etter
1940s	31 December 1944	Eduard von Steiger	Ernst Nobs	Walther Stampfli	Karl Kobelt	Enrico Celio	Max Petitpierre	Philipp Etter
1940s	31 December 1947	Eduard von Steiger	Ernst Nobs	Rodolphe Rubattel	Karl Kobelt	Enrico Celio	Max Petitpierre	Philipp Etter
1950s		Eduard von Steiger	Ernst Nobs	Rodolphe Rubattel	Karl Kobelt	Enrico Celio	Max Petitpierre	Philipp Etter
1950s	15 October 1950	Eduard von Steiger	Ernst Nobs	Rodolphe Rubattel	Karl Kobelt	Josef Escher	Max Petitpierre	Philipp Etter
1950s	13 December 1951	Markus Feldmann	Ernst Nobs	Rodolphe Rubattel	Karl Kobelt	Josef Escher	Max Petitpierre	Philipp Etter
1950s	31 December 1951	Markus Feldmann	Max Weber	Rodolphe Rubattel	Karl Kobelt	Josef Escher	Max Petitpierre	Philipp Etter
1950s	9 December 1954	Markus Feldmann	Max Weber	Rodolphe Rubattel	Karl Kobelt	Thomas Holenstein	Max Petitpierre	Philipp Etter
1950s	31 December 1954	Markus Feldmann	Hans Streuli	Paul Chaudet	Giuseppe Lepori	Thomas Holenstein	Max Petitpierre	Philipp Etter
1950s	11 December 1958	Friedrich Traugott Wahlen	Hans Streuli	Paul Chaudet	Giuseppe Lepori	Thomas Holenstein	Max Petitpierre	Philipp Etter
1960s	31 December 1959	Friedrich Traugott Wahlen	Willy Spühler	Paul Chaudet	Hans-Peter Tschudi	Ludwig von Moos	Max Petitpierre	Jean Bourgknecht
1960s	30 June 1961	Friedrich Traugott Wahlen	Willy Spühler	Paul Chaudet	Hans-Peter Tschudi	Ludwig von Moos	Hans Schaffner	Jean Bourgknecht
1960s	30 September 1962	Friedrich Traugott Wahlen	Willy Spühler	Paul Chaudet	Hans-Peter Tschudi	Ludwig von Moos	Hans Schaffner	Roger Bonvin
1960s	31 December 1965	Rudolf Gnägi	Willy Spühler	Paul Chaudet	Hans-Peter Tschudi	Ludwig von Moos	Hans Schaffner	Roger Bonvin
1960s	31 December 1966	Rudolf Gnägi	Willy Spühler	Nello Celio	Hans-Peter Tschudi	Ludwig von Moos	Hans Schaffner	Roger Bonvin
1970s	31 December 1969	Rudolf Gnägi	Willy Spühler	Nello Celio	Hans-Peter Tschudi	Ludwig von Moos	Ernst Brugger	Roger Bonvin
1970s	31 January 1970	Rudolf Gnägi	Pierre Graber	Nello Celio	Hans-Peter Tschudi	Ludwig von Moos	Ernst Brugger	Roger Bonvin
1970s	31 December 1971	Rudolf Gnägi	Pierre Graber	Nello Celio	Hans-Peter Tschudi	Kurt Furgler	Ernst Brugger	Roger Bonvin
1970s	1 December 1973	Rudolf Gnägi	Pierre Graber	Nello Celio	Willi Ritschard	Kurt Furgler	Ernst Brugger	Roger Bonvin
1970s	31 December 1973	Rudolf Gnägi	Pierre Graber	Georges-André Chevallaz	Willi Ritschard	Kurt Furgler	Ernst Brugger	Hans Hürlimann
1970s	31 January 1978	Rudolf Gnägi	Pierre Aubert	Georges-André Chevallaz	Willi Ritschard	Kurt Furgler	Fritz Honegger	Hans Hürlimann
1980s	31 December 1979	Leon Schlumpf	Pierre Aubert	Georges-André Chevallaz	Willi Ritschard	Kurt Furgler	Fritz Honegger	Hans Hürlimann
1980s	31 December 1982	Leon Schlumpf	Pierre Aubert	Georges-André Chevallaz	Willi Ritschard	Kurt Furgler	Rudolf Friedrich	Alphons Egli
1980s	7 December 1983	Leon Schlumpf	Pierre Aubert	Georges-André Chevallaz	Otto Stich	Kurt Furgler	Rudolf Friedrich	Alphons Egli
1980s	31 December 1983	Leon Schlumpf	Pierre Aubert	Jean-Pascal Delamuraz	Otto Stich	Kurt Furgler	Rudolf Friedrich	Alphons Egli
1980s	20 October 1984	Leon Schlumpf	Pierre Aubert	Jean-Pascal Delamuraz	Otto Stich	Kurt Furgler	Elisabeth Kopp	Alphons Egli
1980s	31 December 1986	Leon Schlumpf	Pierre Aubert	Jean-Pascal Delamuraz	Otto Stich	Arnold Koller	Elisabeth Kopp	Flavio Cotti
1980s	31 December 1987	Adolf Ogi	René Felber	Jean-Pascal Delamuraz	Otto Stich	Arnold Koller	Elisabeth Kopp	Flavio Cotti
1980s	12 January 1989	Adolf Ogi	René Felber	Jean-Pascal Delamuraz	Otto Stich	Arnold Koller	Kaspar Villiger	Flavio Cotti
1990s	1 January 1990	Adolf Ogi	René Felber	Jean-Pascal Delamuraz	Otto Stich	Arnold Koller	Kaspar Villiger	Flavio Cotti
1990s	1 April 1993	Adolf Ogi	Ruth Dreifuss	Jean-Pascal Delamuraz	Otto Stich	Arnold Koller	Kaspar Villiger	Flavio Cotti
1990s	1 November 1995	Adolf Ogi	Ruth Dreifuss	Jean-Pascal Delamuraz	Moritz Leuenberger	Arnold Koller	Kaspar Villiger	Flavio Cotti
1990s	1 April 1998	Adolf Ogi	Ruth Dreifuss	Pascal Couchepin	Moritz Leuenberger	Arnold Koller	Kaspar Villiger	Flavio Cotti
1990s	1 May 1999	Adolf Ogi	Ruth Dreifuss	Pascal Couchepin	Moritz Leuenberger	Ruth Metzler	Kaspar Villiger	Joseph Deiss
2000s		Adolf Ogi	Ruth Dreifuss	Pascal Couchepin	Moritz Leuenberger	Ruth Metzler	Kaspar Villiger	Joseph Deiss
2000s	1 January 2001	Samuel Schmid	Ruth Dreifuss	Pascal Couchepin	Moritz Leuenberger	Ruth Metzler	Kaspar Villiger	Joseph Deiss
2000s	1 January 2003	Samuel Schmid	Micheline Calmy-Rey	Pascal Couchepin	Moritz Leuenberger	Ruth Metzler	Kaspar Villiger	Joseph Deiss
2000s	1 January 2004	Samuel Schmid	Micheline Calmy-Rey	Pascal Couchepin	Moritz Leuenberger	Christoph Blocher	Hans-Rudolf Merz	Joseph Deiss
2000s	1 August 2006	Samuel Schmid	Micheline Calmy-Rey	Pascal Couchepin	Moritz Leuenberger	Christoph Blocher	Hans-Rudolf Merz	Doris Leuthard
2000s	1 January 2008	Samuel Schmid	Micheline Calmy-Rey	Pascal Couchepin	Moritz Leuenberger	Eveline Widmer-Schlumpf	Hans-Rudolf Merz	Doris Leuthard
2000s	1 November 2008	Samuel Schmid	Micheline Calmy-Rey	Pascal Couchepin	Moritz Leuenberger	Eveline Widmer-Schlumpf	Hans-Rudolf Merz	Doris Leuthard
2000s	1 January 2009	Ueli Maurer	Micheline Calmy-Rey	Pascal Couchepin	Moritz Leuenberger	Eveline Widmer-Schlumpf	Hans-Rudolf Merz	Doris Leuthard
2000s	1 November 2009	Ueli Maurer	Micheline Calmy-Rey	Didier Burkhalter	Moritz Leuenberger	Eveline Widmer-Schlumpf	Hans-Rudolf Merz	Doris Leuthard
2010s		Ueli Maurer	Micheline Calmy-Rey	Didier Burkhalter		Eveline Widmer-Schlumpf		Doris Leuthard
2010s	1 November 2010	Ueli Maurer	Micheline Calmy-Rey	Didier Burkhalter	Simonetta Sommaruga	Eveline Widmer-Schlumpf	Johann Schneider-Ammann	Doris Leuthard
2010s	1 January 2012	Ueli Maurer	Alain Berset	Didier Burkhalter	Simonetta Sommaruga	Eveline Widmer-Schlumpf	Johann Schneider-Ammann	Doris Leuthard
2010s	1 January 2016	Ueli Maurer	Alain Berset	Didier Burkhalter	Simonetta Sommaruga	Guy Parmelin	Johann Schneider-Ammann	Doris Leuthard
2010s	1 November 2017	Ueli Maurer	Alain Berset	Ignazio Cassis	Simonetta Sommaruga	Guy Parmelin	Johann Schneider-Ammann	Doris Leuthard
2010s	1 January 2019	Ueli Maurer	Alain Berset	Ignazio Cassis	Simonetta Sommaruga	Guy Parmelin	Karin Keller-Sutter	Viola Amherd
2020s		Ueli Maurer	Alain Berset	Ignazio Cassis	Simonetta Sommaruga	Guy Parmelin	Karin Keller-Sutter	Viola Amherd
2020s	1 January 2021	Ueli Maurer	Alain Berset	Ignazio Cassis	Simonetta Sommaruga	Guy Parmelin	Karin Keller-Sutter	Viola Amherd
2020s	1 January 2023	Albert Rösti	Alain Berset	Ignazio Cassis	Élisabeth Baume-Schneider	Guy Parmelin	Karin Keller-Sutter	Viola Amherd
2020s	1 January 2024	Albert Rösti	Beat Jans	Ignazio Cassis	Élisabeth Baume-Schneider	Guy Parmelin	Karin Keller-Sutter	Viola Amherd
2020s	1 April 2025	Albert Rösti	Beat Jans	Ignazio Cassis	Élisabeth Baume-Schneider	Guy Parmelin	Karin Keller-Sutter	Martin Pfister
2020s	26 March 2026	Albert Rösti	Beat Jans	Ignazio Cassis	Élisabeth Baume-Schneider	Guy Parmelin	Karin Keller-Sutter	Martin Pfister
