= 1982 in Switzerland =

- Decades: 1960s; 1970s; 1980s; 1990s; 2000s
- See also: History of Switzerland; Timeline of Swiss history; List of years in Switzerland

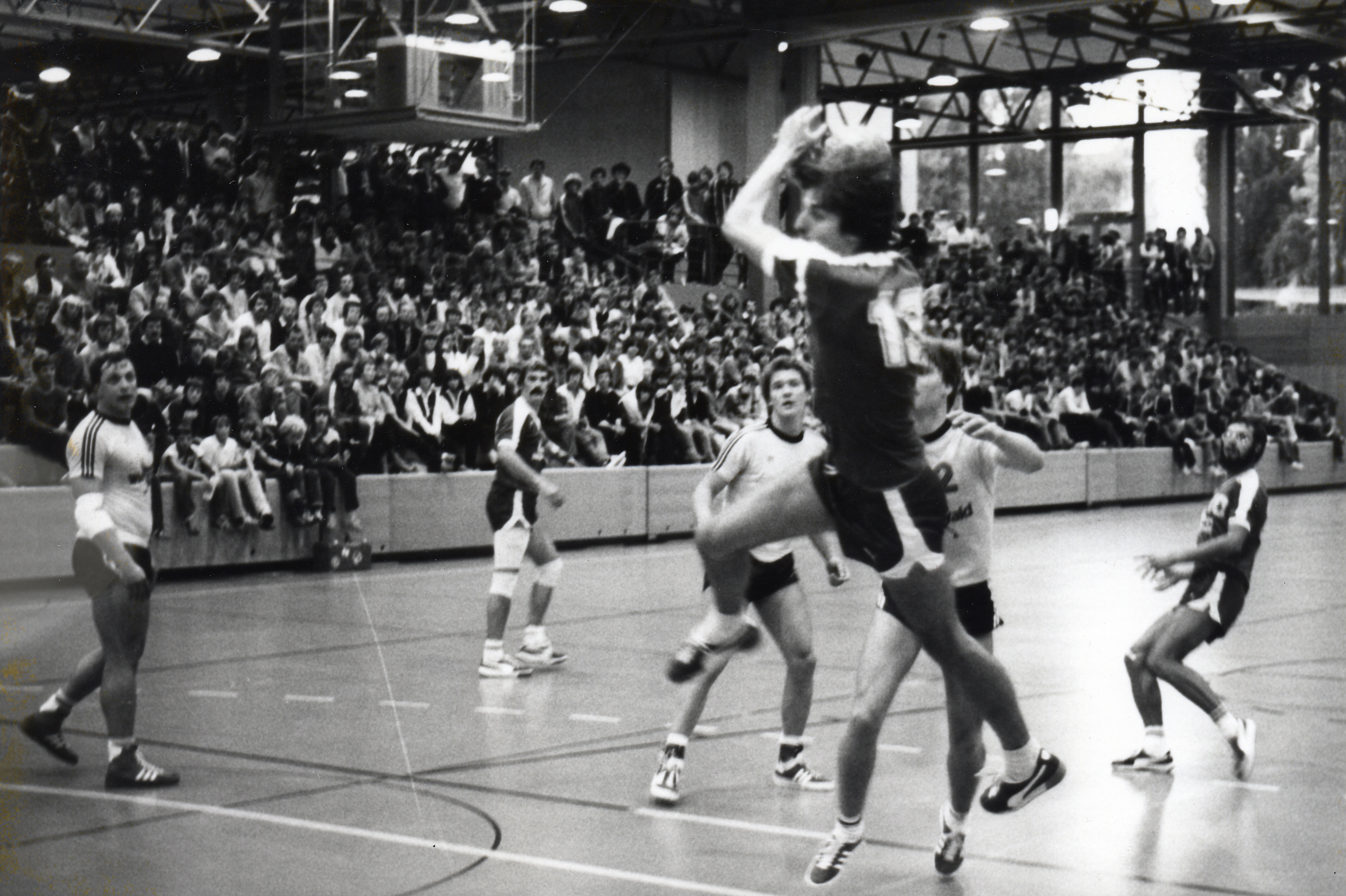
1982: 1200 spectators in the Gym sports hall by the lake at the handball game HC Gym Biel Otmar St. Gallen.

Events during the year 1982 in Switzerland.

== Incumbents ==
- Federal Council:
  - Kurt Furgler (President)
  - Hans Hürlimann (until December)
  - Fritz Honegger (until December)
  - Willi Ritschard
  - Georges-André Chevallaz
  - Pierre Aubert
  - Leon Schlumpf
  - Alphons Egli (from December)
  - Rudolf Friedrich (from December)

== Events ==
- 16–21 March – The 1982 World Women's Curling Championship takes place in Geneva.
- The art museum Kirchner Museum Davos is founded in Davos.

== Births ==
- 11 November – Fedayi San, FIFA football referee
- 18 November – Olivia Nobs, snowboarder

== Deaths ==
- 5 June – Roger Bonvin, politician (born 1907)
- 28 June – Adolf Portmann, zoologist (born 1897)
