= 1978 in Switzerland =

- Decades: 1950s; 1960s; 1970s; 1980s; 1990s
- See also: History of Switzerland; Timeline of Swiss history; List of years in Switzerland

Events during the year 1978 in Switzerland.

== Incumbents ==
- Federal Council:
  - Willi Ritschard (president)
  - Rudolf Gnägi
  - Pierre Graber (until January), then Pierre Aubert
  - Ernst Brugger (until January), then Fritz Honegger
  - Georges-André Chevallaz
  - Kurt Furgler
  - Hans Hürlimann

== Events ==
- 24 September – A referendum takes place resulting in the creation of the Canton of Jura, previously part of the Canton of Bern.

== Births ==
- 7 October – Simon Schoch, snowboarder
- 13 October – Binia Feltscher, curler
