= 1981 in Switzerland =

- Decades: 1960s; 1970s; 1980s; 1990s; 2000s
- See also: History of Switzerland; Timeline of Swiss history; List of years in Switzerland

Events during the year 1981 in Switzerland.

== Incumbents ==
- Federal Council:
  - Kurt Furgler (president)
  - Leon Schlumpf
  - Pierre Aubert
  - Fritz Honegger
  - Georges-André Chevallaz
  - Hans Hürlimann
  - Willi Ritschard

== Events ==
- 7–12 December – The 1981 European Curling Championships take place in Grindelwald.

== Births ==
- 8 August – Roger Federer, tennis player
- 26 October – Martina Schild, alpine skier
- 6 November – Daniela Meuli, snowboarder
