= 1980 in Switzerland =

- Decades: 1960s; 1970s; 1980s; 1990s; 2000s
- See also: History of Switzerland; Timeline of Swiss history; List of years in Switzerland

Events during the year 1980 in Switzerland.

== Incumbents ==
- Federal Council:
  - Georges-André Chevallaz (president)
  - Leon Schlumpf
  - Pierre Aubert
  - Fritz Honegger
  - Kurt Furgler
  - Hans Hürlimann
  - Willi Ritschard

== Births ==
- 30 September – Martina Hingis, tennis player

== Deaths ==
- 7 February – Rudolf Bosshard, rower (born 1890)
- 22 February
  - Enrico Celio, politician (born 1889)
  - Oskar Kokoschka, artist (born 1886 in Austria)
