= 1983 in Switzerland =

- Decades: 1960s; 1970s; 1980s; 1990s; 2000s
- See also: History of Switzerland; Timeline of Swiss history; List of years in Switzerland

Events during the year 1983 in Switzerland.

== Incumbents ==
- Federal Council:
  - Pierre Aubert (President)
  - Leon Schlumpf
  - Alphons Egli
  - Rudolf Friedrich
  - Willi Ritschard (resigned 16 October)
  - Georges-André Chevallaz (resigned 31 December)
  - Kurt Furgler
  - Otto Stich (elected 7 December)
  - Jean-Pascal Delamuraz (elected 7 December)

== Events ==
- 28 May – The Green Party of Switzerland is established.
- The UCI Track Cycling World Championships take place in Zürich.

== Births ==
- 24 June – Valeria Spälty, curler

== Deaths ==
- 25 June – Alberto Ginastera, composer (born 1916 in Argentina)
- 10 September – Felix Bloch, Swiss-American physicist and Nobel physics laureate (born 1905)
- 16 October – Willi Ritschard, politician (born 1918)
