= 1975 in Switzerland =

- Decades: 1950s; 1960s; 1970s; 1980s; 1990s
- See also: History of Switzerland; Timeline of Swiss history; List of years in Switzerland

Events during the year 1975 in Switzerland.

== Incumbents ==
- Federal Council:
  - Pierre Graber (president)
  - Hans Hürlimann
  - Georges-André Chevallaz
  - Willi Ritschard
  - Kurt Furgler
  - Ernst Brugger
  - Rudolf Gnägi

== Events ==
=== January ===
- 2 January – Major fire at the Fischer casting company in Alpnach-Dorf (Obwalden). Damage amounts to 15 million francs
- 17-19 January – In the context of the International "Year of the Woman", there were demonstrations and the Fourth Congress of Swiss Women held in Bern
- 26 January – Fire at the "Au Grand Passage" store in Geneva. The establishment is completely destroyed from the second to the sixth floor. Damage estimated near one hundred million francs

=== February ===
- 5 February – Guido Nobel is appointed director of the PTT replacing Fritz Bourquin, who resigned
- 13 February – Opening of Glattzentrum, the first large shopping center in Switzerland located on the outskirts of Zurich in Wallisellen, housing several brands like Migros, Globus, and Jelmoli
- 14 February – Protest in Sion against the closure of Bally workshops in Valais
- 22 February – For the fourth time in its history, CP Berne becomes Swiss ice hockey champion
- 26 February – Moritz Suter, former pilot of Swissair, founds Business Flyers Basel, which will later become Crossair

=== March ===
- 2 March – Federal votes. The article of the constitution on conjunctural policy is not approved by the cantons (11 against 11), although the people approved it with 542,745 yes (52.8%) against 485,844 no (47.2%)
- 6 March – The National Council debates the legalization of abortion
- 16 March – In the context of the Jura question plebiscites, the districts of Courtelary, Moutier, and La Neuveville vote to remain in the Canton of Bern
- 27 March – Last projection of the Ciné-Journal Suisse in cinemas

=== April ===
- 1 April – 500 anti-nuclear activists invade the site planned for the construction of the nuclear power plant in Kaiseraugst
- 5 April – Avalanches block roads and railways in the Alps
- 6 April – An avalanche carries away a chalet in Val Blenio. Its five occupants are killed instantly
- 12 April – At the maternity ward in Bern, Ruth Winterberger from Brienz gives birth to quintuplets
- 20 April
  - Cantonal elections in Basel-Landschaft. Clemens Stöckli (CVP), Theo Meier (FDP), Paul Manz (UDC), Paul Jenni (SPS), and Paul Nyffeler (FDP) are elected to the Council of States in the first round of voting
  - Cantonal elections in Ticino. Benito Bernasconi (SPS), Ugo Sadis (FDP), Argante Righetti (FDP), Flavio Cotti (CVP), and Fabio Vassalli (CVP) are elected to the Council of States in the first round of voting
- 27 April
  - Cantonal elections in Zurich. Jakob Stucki (UDC), Peter Wiederkehr (CVP), Hans Künzi (FDP), Alois Günthard (UDC), Albert Mossdorf (FDP), Alfred Gilgen AdI, and Arthur Bachmann (SPS) are elected to the Council of States in the first round of voting

=== May ===
- 3 May – Inauguration of the new Theater Basel
- 22 May – General Motors announces the closure of its assembly line in Bienne (BE) by the end of August. 450 people will lose their jobs
- 25 May – Inauguration of the SBB line at Heitersberg, between Lenzburg and Zurich. The new route reduces travel time by 10 minutes between Olten and Zurich
- 29 May – Discontinuation of ferry transport for railcars on Lake Constance
- 31 May – Premiere of the revival of La Servante d’Evolène by René Morax at the Théâtre du Jorat in Mézières, directed by Paul Pasquier

=== June ===
- 8 June
  - 1975 Swiss referendums. The people approve, with 1,153,338 yes (85.5%) against 195,219 no (14.5%), the federal decree on currency safeguarding
  - Federal votes. The people approve, with 721,313 yes (53.5%) against 627,980 no (46.5%), the federal decree concerning national road financing
  - Federal votes. The people reject, with 694,252 no (51.8%) against 646,687 yes (48.2%), the federal law amending the general tariff of customs
  - Federal votes. The people approve, with 753,642 yes (56.0%) against 593,041 no (44.0%), the federal decree concerning tax revenue increase
  - Federal votes. The people approve, with 1,021,315 yes (75.9%) against 323,511 no (24.1%), the federal decree curbing decisions on expenditures
- 14 June – FC Zurich secures, for the seventh time in its history, the title of Swiss football champions
- 20 June – Belgian Roger De Vlaeminck wins the Tour de Suisse cycling race
- 25–28 June – The 1975 World Archery Championships take place in Interlaken

=== August ===
- 1 August – In Helsinki, ratification of the final act of the Conference on Security and Co-operation in Europe by thirty-five countries, including Switzerland
- 30 August – Torrential rains in the region of Langenthal cause significant damage due to flooding of the Langete

=== September ===
- 14 September – As part of the Jura referendums, the German-speaking district of Laufen votes to remain in the Canton of Bern
- 16 September – Heavy rain in Ticino. Landslides lead to the closure of the Val Blenio road and the Lukmanier Pass becomes impassable

=== October ===
- 11 October – Inauguration of the new Montreux Casino
- 17 October – Swiss chemist of Croatian origin Vladimir Prelog receives the Nobel Prize in Chemistry
- 22 October – Ratification of the Bonn agreement, laying the foundation for cross-border cooperation in the Basel region, involving Germany, France, and Switzerland
- 26 October – Federal elections for the National Council. The Socialists emerge victorious with a gain of 9 seats. Securing 25% of the votes, they become the largest party in the National Council (55 seats). The Liberal Party holds 47 seats (-2), the Christian Democrats 46 (+2), and the Swiss People's Party 21 (-2). With 11 seats, the Alliance of Independents remains the strongest non-governmental party

=== November ===
- 6 November – Inauguration of the new road at the Simplon Pass
- 14 November – Opening of a 6.8-kilometre (4.2 mi) section on the A9 motorway, between Villeneuve and Aigle
- 20 November – Opening of an 11-kilometre (6.8 mi) section on the A5 motorway, between Saint-Blaise and Le Landeron
- 24 November – The Swiss Society for the Watch Industry (SSIH) announces the dismissal of 170 people in Bienne and Cornol

== December ==
- 7 December
  - 1975 Swiss referendums. The people approve, with 842,165 yes votes (75.6%) against 271,563 no votes (24.4%), the federal decree amending the constitution regarding freedom of establishment and regulation of assistance
  - Federal referendums. The people approve, with 858,720 yes votes (77.5%) against 249,043 no votes (22.5%), the revision of the constitution in the field of water economy
  - Federal referendums. The people approve, with 587,148 yes votes (52.0%) against 541,489 no votes (48.0%), the federal law on the import and export of processed agricultural products

== Births ==
- 25 January – Sandra Cattaneo, ice hockey player
- 9 May – Andrea Huber, cross-country skier
- 22 December – Sergei Aschwanden, judoka

== Deaths ==
- 10 January – Dorette Berthoud, novelist and literary critic (born 1888)
- 12 February – Carl Lutz, diplomat (born 1895)
- 18 February – Sasha Morgenthaler, artist and creator of the Sasha doll (born 1893)
- 20 February – Jacques Béranger, former director of the Lausanne Municipal Theater (born 1896)
- 28 February – Robert Lips, painter and cartoonist (born 1912)
- 16 March – Francis-Marius Messerli, founder of the Swiss Olympic Association (born 1888)
- 1 April – Alfred Roulin, director of the Cantonal and University Library of Lausanne (born 1885)
- 15 April – Charles Journet, cardinal (born 1891)
- 3 May – Samuel Gonard, president of the International Committee of the Red Cross (born 1896)
- 30 May – Michel Simon, comedian (born 1895)
- 17 December – Ferdinand Gonseth, mathematician and philosopher (born 1890)
- 22 November – Jakob Bührer, writer (born 1882)
