= 1979 in Switzerland =

- Decades: 1950s; 1960s; 1970s; 1980s; 1990s
- See also: History of Switzerland; Timeline of Swiss history; List of years in Switzerland

Events during the year 1979 in Switzerland.

== Incumbents ==
- Federal Council:
  - Hans Hürlimann (president)
  - Rudolf Gnägi (until December), then Leon Schlumpf
  - Pierre Aubert
  - Fritz Honegger
  - Georges-André Chevallaz
  - Willi Ritschard
  - Kurt Furgler

== Events ==
- 26 March–1 April – The 1979 World Curling Championships take place in Bern.

== Births ==
- 14 February – Michèle Moser, curler
- 25 June – Silvana Tirinzoni, curler
- 1 August – Laurence Rochat, cross-country skier
- 2 September – Fabienne Reuteler, snowboarder
