= 1976 in Switzerland =

- Decades: 1950s; 1960s; 1970s; 1980s; 1990s
- See also: History of Switzerland; Timeline of Swiss history; List of years in Switzerland

Events during the year 1976 in Switzerland.

== Incumbents ==
- Federal Council:
  - Rudolf Gnägi (president)
  - Hans Hürlimann
  - Georges-André Chevallaz
  - Willi Ritschard
  - Kurt Furgler
  - Ernst Brugger
  - Pierre Graber

== Events ==
- 13–18 January – The 1976 European Figure Skating Championships take place in Geneva.

== Births ==
- 28 January – Daniel Buess, drummer (d. 2016)
- 6 February – Tanja Frieden, snowboarder
- 7 July – Evelyne Leu, freestyle skier
- 7 December – Manuela Kormann, curler

== Deaths ==
- 24 April – Mark Tobey, American painter (born 1890 in the United States)
