= 1984 in Switzerland =

- Decades: 1960s; 1970s; 1980s; 1990s; 2000s
- See also: History of Switzerland; Timeline of Swiss history; List of years in Switzerland

Events during the year 1984 in Switzerland.

== Incumbents ==
- Federal Council:
  - Leon Schlumpf (President)
  - Pierre Aubert
  - Alphons Egli
  - Rudolf Friedrich (until October), then Elisabeth Kopp
  - Kurt Furgler
  - Otto Stich
  - Jean-Pascal Delamuraz

== Events ==
- 12–17 June – Pope John Paul II tours Switzerland

== Births ==
- 3 April – Selina Gasparin, biathlete

== Deaths ==
- 5 August – Richard Burton, Welsh actor (born 1925)
