= 1974 in Switzerland =

- Decades: 1950s; 1960s; 1970s; 1980s; 1990s
- See also: History of Switzerland; Timeline of Swiss history; List of years in Switzerland

Events during the year 1974 in Switzerland.

== Incumbents ==
- Federal Council:
  - Ernst Brugger
  - Rudolf Gnägi
  - Pierre Graber
  - Kurt Furgler
  - Georges-André Chevallaz
  - Hans Hürlimann
  - Willi Ritschard

== Events ==
- 18–23 March – The 1974 World Curling Championships take place in Bern.

== Births ==
- 16 August – Didier Cuche, alpine skier
- 21 November – Gabi Müller, canoeist

== Deaths ==
- 2 December – Max Weber, politician (born 1897)
