= 1977 in Switzerland =

- Decades: 1950s; 1960s; 1970s; 1980s; 1990s
- See also: History of Switzerland; Timeline of Swiss history; List of years in Switzerland

Events during the year 1977 in Switzerland.

== Incumbents ==
- Federal Council:
  - Kurt Furgler (president)
  - Rudolf Gnägi
  - Hans Hürlimann
  - Georges-André Chevallaz
  - Willi Ritschard
  - Ernst Brugger
  - Pierre Graber

== Births ==
- 14 February – Diana Romagnoli, fencer

== Deaths ==
- 7 August – Paul Chaudet, politician (born 1904)
- 30 September – Heinrich Gretler, actor (born 1897)
- 23 December – Philipp Etter, politician (born 1891)
