= Chevallaz =

Chevallaz is a surname. Notable people with the surname include:

- Georges-André Chevallaz (1915–2002), Swiss historian and politician
- Martin Chevallaz (1948–2024), Swiss military officer and politician
