= 2006 Swiss Federal Council election =

← 2003	14 June 2006	2007 →
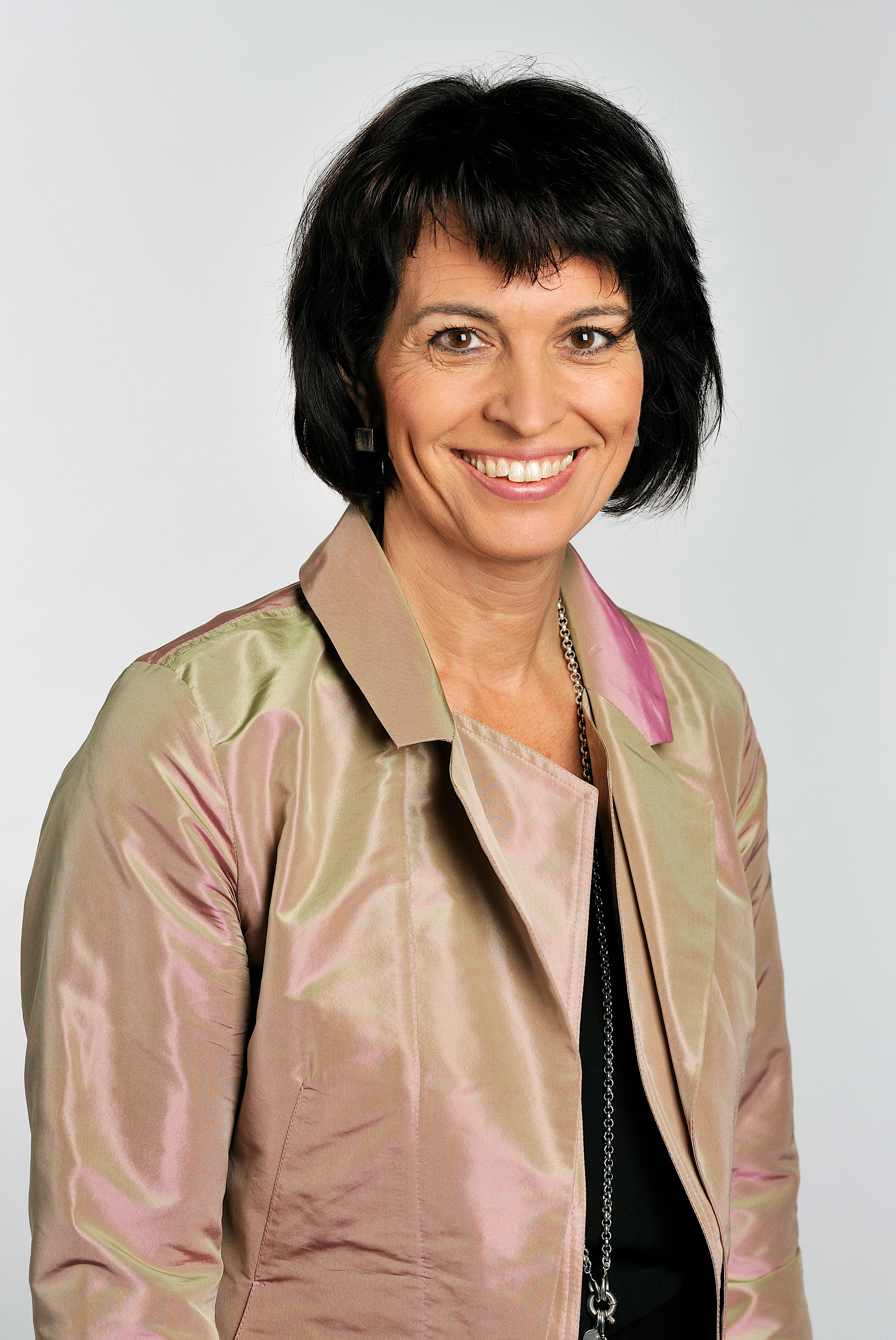

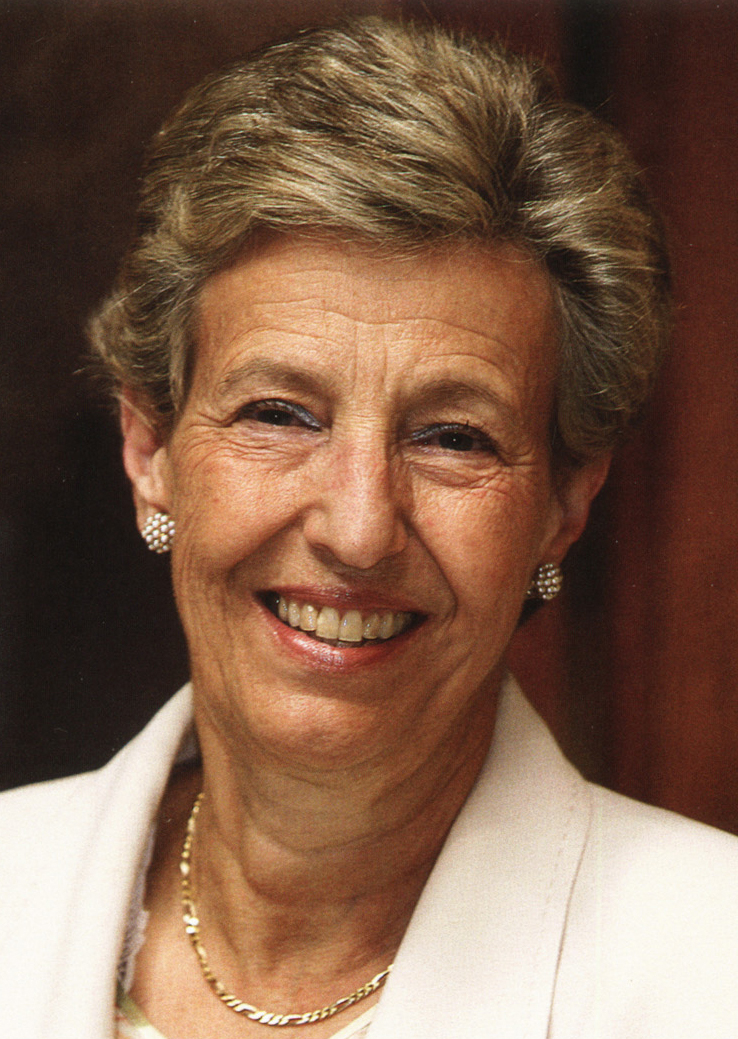
Nominee	Doris Leuthard	Chiara Simoneschi-Cortesi
Party	Christian Democrats	Christian Democrats
Electoral vote	133	29
Federal Councillor before election
Joseph Deiss
Christian Democrats
Elected Federal Councillor
Doris Leuthard
Christian Democrats

On 14 June 2006, a by-election was held for the vacant seat of Joseph Deiss on the Federal Council, the government of Switzerland.

The joint chambers of the Federal Assembly elected Doris Leuthard of the Christian Democratic People's Party of Switzerland in the first round of voting with 133 votes out of 234.

== Candidates ==
Doris Leuthard, at that time president of her party and member of the National Council representing the canton of Aargau, was the only official candidate for the seat of Joseph Deiss. Several other members of her party also received votes.

== Results ==
	Round 1
Doris Leuthard	133
Chiara Simoneschi-Cortesi	29
Lucrezia Meier-Schatz	28
Carlo Schmid	11
Votes received by other persons	33
Votes cast	242
Invalid votes	3
Blank votes	5
Valid votes	234
Absolute majority	118

== See also ==
- List of members of the Swiss Federal Council
