= Ciné-Journal suisse =

Swiss newsreel from 1940 to 1975

The Ciné-Journal suisse (CJS) was the principal audiovisual political information medium in Switzerland from August 1940 to March 1975.

== History ==
Created at the request of the Federal Council, the Swiss Film Chamber foundation controlled it, and in the federal decree of 30 August 1939, it was granted full powers. The Ciné-Journal suisse was produced by Cinégram in Geneva and distributed in German, French, and Italian, as a pre-feature in all cinema halls. Newsreels constituted, in the early days, the only possibility for information, parallel to radio and print newspapers, before the appearance of the television news in 1954. The first editor-in-chief was Paul Alexis Ladame, succeeded by Hans Laemmel.

On 24 January 1975, the Federal Councillor Hans Hürlimann, then head of the Federal Department of Home Affairs, decided to abolish the Ciné-Journal suisse due to a budget reduction, from 720,000 to 360,000 Swiss francs, and it could no longer continue to exist. The foundation that managed it was liquidated shortly thereafter. The last editor-in-chief of the Ciné-Journal suisse was Peter Gerdes.

Over the 35 years of the Ciné-Journal suisse, more than 6,600 items were distributed, representing nearly 200 hours of film.

=== The first unofficial Ciné-Journal suisse ===
Before the official Ciné-Journal suisse, the Office cinématographique in Lausanne, a company founded by Émile Taponnier, Jacques Béranger, and Arthur-Adrien Porchet, had created a Ciné-Journal suisse in 1923. It ceased in March 1936, overwhelmed by foreign competition.

== Role during World War II ==
During World War II, the Ciné-Journal suisse helped counter the overwhelming dominance of foreign newsreels, primarily from Nazi Germany, which occupied a large part of Europe, while Switzerland during the war was preserved due to its neutrality. From 16 April 1940 until the end of 1945, the Ciné-Journal suisse was made mandatory in all cinemas in the country and was subject to military censorship.

== Ciné-Journal suisse on the Internet ==
Memoriav (Association for the Preservation of Swiss Audiovisual Memory), the Swiss Film Archive, and the Swiss Federal Archives, supported by the Federal Office of Culture (OFC), the Ernst Goehner Foundation, the lottery fund of the canton of Ticino, and Swiss Broadcasting Corporation (SSR), have taken the initiative to distribute the entire Ciné-Journal suisse on the internet.

This online distribution will proceed progressively, starting with the 1956 Ciné-Journals on 12 November 2016, on the occasion of the 20th edition of the Kurzfilmtage in Winterthur, followed by the others during 2017
