= Martin Chevallaz =

Swiss politician (1948–2024)

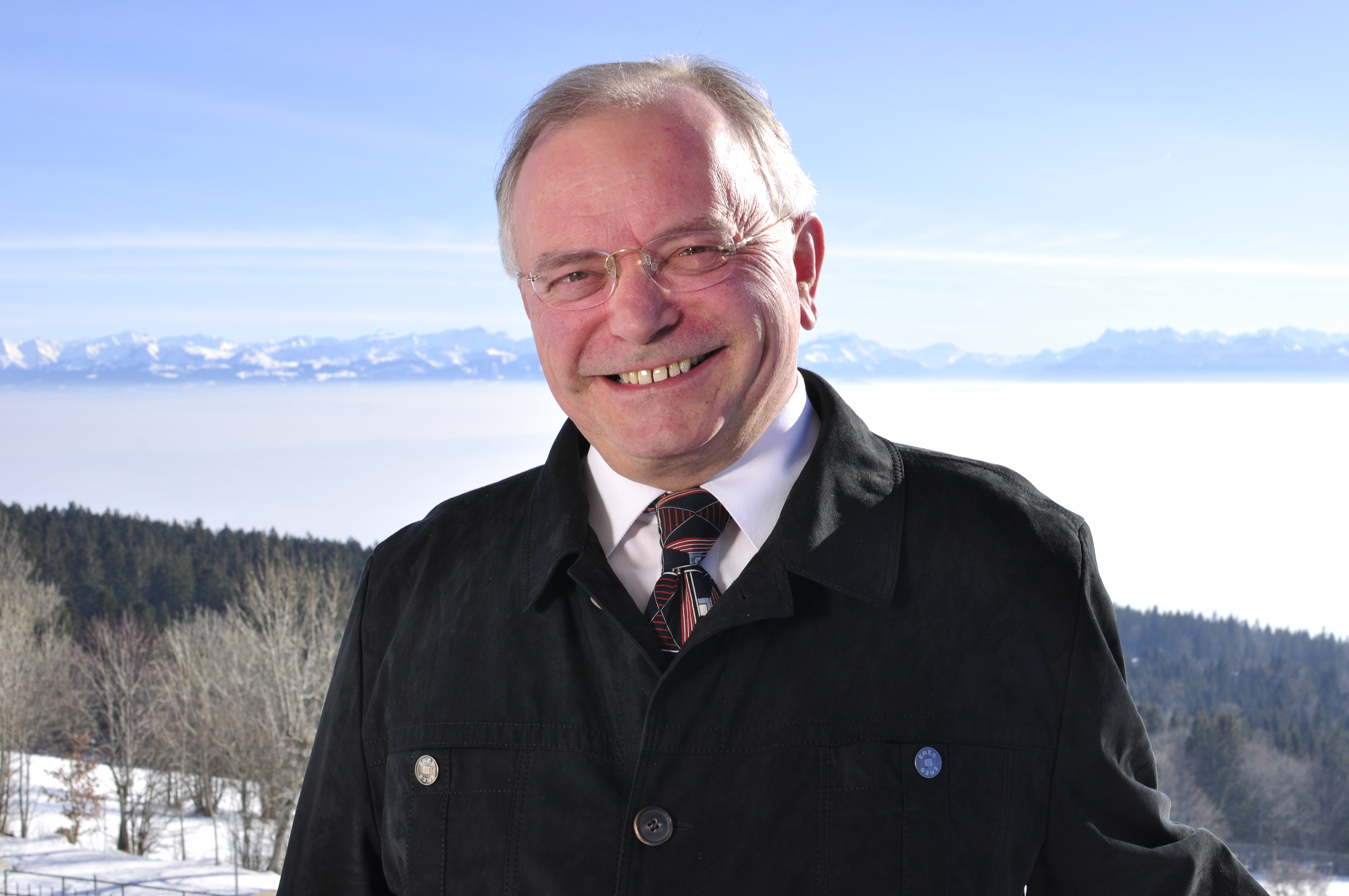
- Chevallaz in 2012

Member of the Grand Council of Vaud
- In office 3 March 2002 – 31 December 2005

Personal details
- Born: 9 August 1948 Lausanne, Vaud, Switzerland
- Died: 5 December 2024 (aged 76)
- Party: PRD (until 1993); UDC (2002–2011, 2016–2024); PBD (2011–2016)
- Relations: Georges-André Chevallaz (father); Olivier Chevallaz (brother)
- Occupation: Military officer

Martin Chevallaz (9 August 1948 – 5 December 2024) was a Swiss military officer and politician of the Radical Democratic Party (PRD), the Democratic Union of the Centre (UDC), and the Swiss Democratic Bourgeois Party (PBD).

He gained notoriety for his campaign in Romandy for the Campaign for an Independent and Neutral Switzerland, which opposed Swiss accession into the European Economic Area.

== Biography ==
=== Family and military career ===
Born in Lausanne on 9 August 1948, Chevallaz was the son of former Federal Council member Georges-André Chevallaz and the brother of former National Council member Olivier Chevallaz. He spent the early part of his career in the Swiss Armed Forces, receiving a promotion to major in 1985 and later to lieutenant-colonel. However, his campaigning against the accession of Switzerland into the European Economic Area slowed down his military career, finally being promoted to brigadier in 1999. In 1987, he was named Vice-President of the Lausanne section of the Swiss Officers Association, then to President the following year. He co-authored a French-language manifesto opposed to the reform of Army 95 titled Manifeste pour une armée digne de ce nom.

=== Opposition to the European Economic Area ===
In 1992, during the campaigning for the Referendum on Switzerland's accession to the European Economic Area, Chevallaz was one of the most vocal French-language advocates against the measure. He opposed the Maastricht Treaty, criticizing its "socialist-inspired" ideals despite the fact that he "felt European". At the end of 1991, he led the Campaign for an Independent and Neutral Switzerland (ASIN), which employed him until the end of the referendum campaign. To support the campaign, he resigned from his post as a drill instructor. Throughout the campaign, he found himself at odds with the PRD, of which he was a member. The referendum narrowly failed on 6 December 1992, though more than 60% of votes in Romandy were in favor.

Following the campaign, Chevallaz was not reinstated as a drill instructor despite his disputed claims of a promised return. He continued to do temporary work for ASIN before obtaining an administrative position with the Armed Forces in 1993, finally receiving his promotion to brigadier in 1999. In 1993, he decided to leave the PRD. In 1994, he resigned as vice-president of ASIN over the association's opposition to the creation of a Swiss corps of United Nations peacekeeping forces, which he supported. He later left ASIN altogether over the tone it used in campaigns.

=== Political career ===
In 2002, Chevallaz joined the UDC despite disagreeing with its communication style. In that year's election to the Grand Council of Vaud, he won a mandate to represent the district of Pully. He held his seat until 31 December 2005. In 2004, following the resignation of Socialist Party member Pierre Chiffelle, he named himself a candidate for the Council of State of Vaud without receiving approval from his party. However, he was still supported by the UDC, the PRD, and the Liberal Party. He was handily defeated by Socialist Party member Pierre-Yves Maillard, receiving 30% of the vote to Maillard's 63%. In 2005, he announced his retirement from politics after his promotion to Infantry Brigadier II.

In 2011, Chevallaz changed parties again due to the UDC's alleged "radicalization". That April, he was a founding member of the Vaud section of the PBD and became its first president. In 2012, he again ran for a seat on the Vaud Council of State but received 6% of the vote. He resigned as Vaud section president in 2012 following its "rapprochement" with the Christian Democratic Party. He then rejoined the UDC in 2016 and unsuccessfully ran for mayor of Épalinges. He was also a member of several environmental organizations, including the World Wide Fund for Nature, Pro Alps, and Écologie libérale, which was committed to phasing out nuclear power.

=== Death ===
Martin Chevallaz died on 5 December 2024, at the age of 76.
