= Grenchenberg =

Mountain in Switzerland

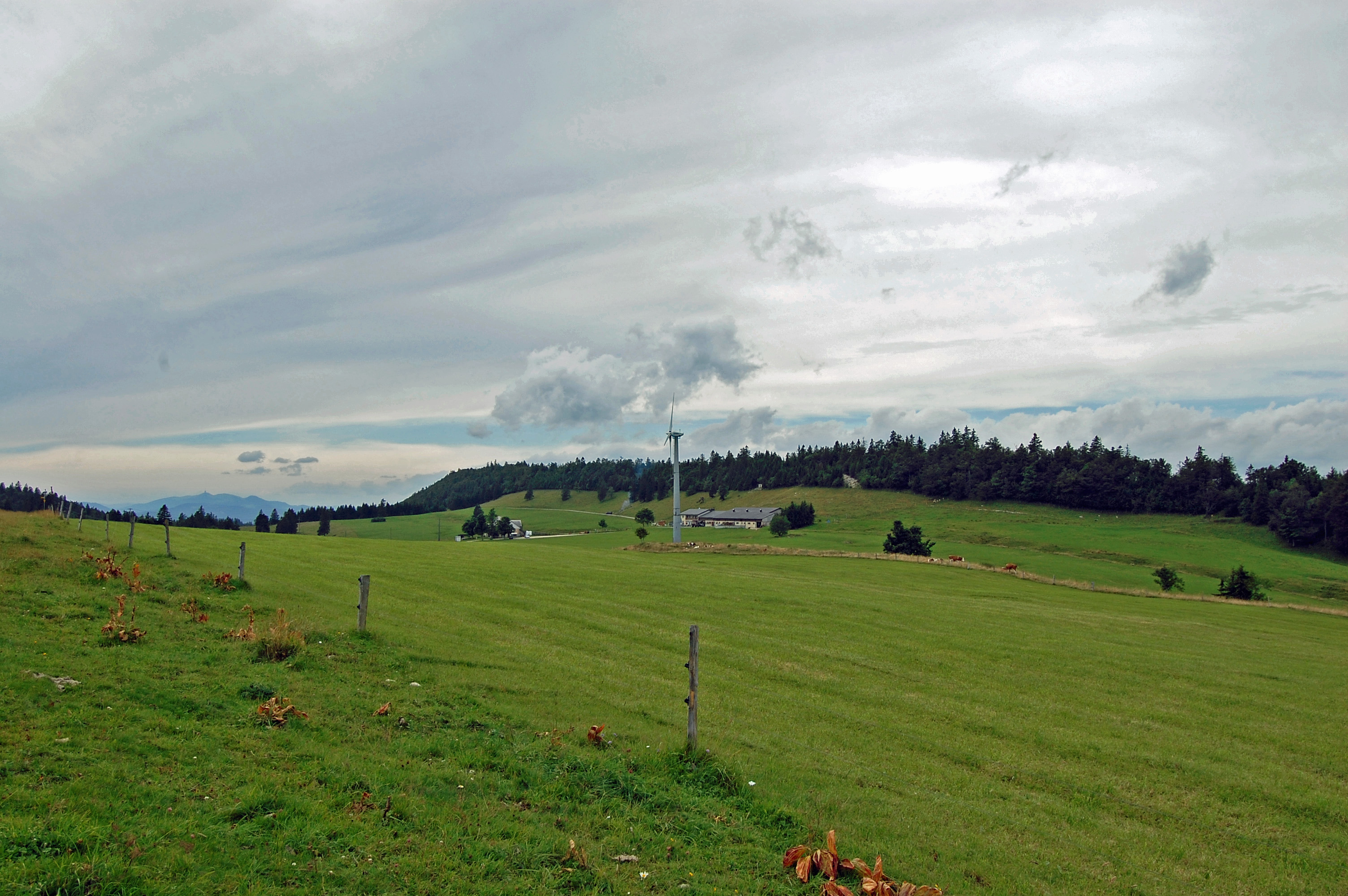
- View from Obergrenchenberg. The summit is on the left of the wooded ridge

Highest point
- Elevation: 1,405 m (4,610 ft)
- Prominence: 96 m (315 ft)
- Parent peak: Hasenmatt
- Coordinates: 47°13′47″N 7°23′02″E

Geography
- Location within Switzerland
- Location: Bern/Solothurn, Switzerland
- Parent range: Jura Mountains

The Grenchenberg (1,405 m) is a mountain of the Jura, located on the border between the Swiss cantons of Bern and Solothurn. The mountain is named after the town of Grenchen, located on its south side.
