= 1975 Swiss referendums =

Nine referendums were held in Switzerland in 1975. The first was held on 2 March on an amendment to the Swiss Federal Constitution on the article on the economic cycle. Although it was approved by a majority of voters, it did not receive the support of a majority of cantons (the result was an 11–11 tie), so was rejected. The next five were held on 8 June on protecting currency (approved), financing the national road network (approved), amending the general tariff (rejected), increasing taxes the following year (approved) and restricting federal expenditure (approved). The final three were held on 7 December on a constitutional amendment on the right to residence and welfare benefits (approved), a constitutional amendment on water management (approved) and a federal law on the import and export of agricultural goods (approved).

== Results ==
=== March: Economic cycle ===
Choice	Popular vote		Cantons		
Choice	Votes	%	Full	Half	Total
For	542,745	52.8	10	2	11
Against	485,844	47.2	9	4	11
Blank votes	24,892	–	–	–	–
Invalid votes	1,448	–	–	–	–
Total	1,054,929	100	19	6	22
Registered voters/turnout	3,712,238	28.4	–	–	–
Source: Nohlen & Stöver

=== June: Currency protection ===
Choice	Popular vote		Cantons		
Choice	Votes	%	Full	Half	Total
For	1,153,338	85.5	19	6	22
Against	195,219	14.5	0	0	0
Blank votes	19,737	–	–	–	–
Invalid votes	1,525	–	–	–	–
Total	1,369,819	100	19	6	22
Registered voters/turnout	3,719,992	36.8	–	–	–
Source: Nohlen & Stöver

=== June: National road network ===
Choice	Votes	%
For	721,313	53.5
Against	627,980	46.5
Blank votes	18,518	–
Invalid votes	1,507	–
Total	1,369,318	100
Registered voters/turnout	3,719,992	36.8
Source: Nohlen & Stöver

=== June: General tariff ===
Choice	Votes	%
For	646,687	48.2
Against	694,252	51.8
Blank votes	26,004	–
Invalid votes	1,589	–
Total	1,368,532	100
Registered voters/turnout	3,719,992	36.8
Source: Nohlen & Stöver

=== June: Increasing taxes ===
Choice	Popular vote		Cantons		
Choice	Votes	%	Full	Half	Total
For	753,642	56.0	14	6	17
Against	593,041	44.0	5	0	5
Blank votes	21,398	–	–	–	–
Invalid votes	1,618	–	–	–	–
Total	1,369,699	100	19	6	22
Registered voters/turnout	3,719,992	36.8	–	–	–
Source: Nohlen & Stöver

=== June: Spending restrictions ===
Choice	Popular vote		Cantons		
Choice	Votes	%	Full	Half	Total
For	1,021,315	75.9	19	6	22
Against	323,511	24.1	0	0	0
Blank votes	22,828	–	–	–	–
Invalid votes	1,605	–	–	–	–
Total	1,369,259	100	19	6	22
Registered voters/turnout	3,719,992	36.8	–	–	–
Source: Nohlen & Stöver

=== December: Constitutional amendment on residence and welfare benefits ===
Choice	Popular vote		Cantons		
Choice	Votes	%	Full	Half	Total
For	842,165	75.6	19	6	22
Against	271,563	24.4	0	0	0
Blank votes	39,934	–	–	–	–
Invalid votes	1,474	–	–	–	–
Total	1,155,136	100	19	6	22
Registered voters/turnout	3,737,823	30.9	–	–	–
Source: Nohlen & Stöver

=== December: Constitutional amendment on water management ===
Choice	Popular vote		Cantons		
Choice	Votes	%	Full	Half	Total
For	858,720	77.5	18	6	21
Against	249,043	22.5	1	0	1
Blank votes	46,897	–	–	–	–
Invalid votes	1,559	–	–	–	–
Total	1,156,219	100	19	6	22
Registered voters/turnout	3,737,823	30.9	–	–	–
Source: Nohlen & Stöver

=== December: Federal law on the import and export of agricultural goods ===
Choice	Votes	%
For	587,148	52.0
Against	541,489	48.0
Blank votes	31,605	–
Invalid votes	1,575	–
Total	1,161,817	100
Registered voters/turnout	3,737,823	31.1
Source: Nohlen & Stöver
