= 1978 Swiss referendums =

Fourteen referendums were held in Switzerland in 1978. The first four were held on 26 February on a popular initiative "for more co-decisions of the Federal Assembly and the People on national road making" (rejected), an amendment to the federal law on aged and bereaved insurance (approved), a popular initiative to lower the retirement age (rejected) and amending the article on the economic cycle in the Swiss Federal Constitution (approved). The next five referendums were held on 28 May on a law on time (rejected), an amendment to the tariff law (approved), a new federal law banning abortion (rejected), a federal law on promoting research and universities (rejected) and a popular initiative "for 12 Sundays a year free from motor vehicles" (rejected).

A tenth referendum was held on 24 September on creating a new canton named Jura, which was approved. The final set of referendums was held on 3 December on a resolution on dairy farming (approved), an animal protection law (approved), a federal law on security (rejected) and a federal law on vocational education (approved).

== Results ==
=== February: Popular initiative on road making ===
Choice	Popular vote		Cantons		
Choice	Votes	%	Full	Half	Total
For	696,501	38.7	0	0	0
Against	1,104,292	61.3	19	6	22
Blank votes	41,857	–	–	–	–
Invalid votes	2,107	–	–	–	–
Total	1,842,057	100	19	6	22
Registered voters/turnout	3,821,750	48.2	–	–	–
Source: Nohlen & Stöver

=== February: Amendment to the federal law on aged and bereaved insurance ===
Choice	Votes	%
For	1,192,144	65.6
Against	625,566	34.4
Blank votes	26,482	–
Invalid votes	1,947	–
Total	1,846,139	100
Registered voters/turnout	3,821,750	48.3
Source: Nohlen & Stöver

=== February: Lowering the retirement age ===
Choice	Popular vote		Cantons		
Choice	Votes	%	Full	Half	Total
For	377,017	20.6	0	0	0
Against	1,451,220	79.4	19	6	22
Blank votes	17,191	–	–	–	–
Invalid votes	1,811	–	–	–	–
Total	1,847,239	100	19	6	22
Registered voters/turnout	3,821,750	48.3	–	–	–
Source: Nohlen & Stöver

=== February: Constitutional amendment on the economic cycle ===
Choice	Popular vote		Cantons		
Choice	Votes	%	Full	Half	Total
For	1,172,130	68.4	19	6	22
Against	542,634	31.6	0	0	0
Blank votes	116,578	–	–	–	–
Invalid votes	3,025	–	–	–	–
Total	1,834,367	100	19	6	22
Registered voters/turnout	3,821,750	48.0	–	–	–
Source: Nohlen & Stöver

=== May: Law on time ===
Choice	Votes	%
For	886,376	47.9
Against	963,862	52.1
Blank votes	28,392	–
Invalid votes	1,324	–
Total	1,879,954	100
Registered voters/turnout	3,835,650	49.0
Source: Nohlen & Stöver

=== May: Amendment to the tariff law ===
Choice	Votes	%
For	971,908	54.8
Against	801,167	45.2
Blank votes	92,832	–
Invalid votes	2,084	–
Total	1,867,991	100
Registered voters/turnout	3,835,650	48.7
Source: Nohlen & Stöver

=== May: Federal law banning abortion ===
Choice	Votes	%
For	559,103	31.2
Against	1,233,149	68.8
Blank votes	79,717	–
Invalid votes	2,543	–
Total	1,874,512	100
Registered voters/turnout	3,835,650	48.9
Source: Nohlen & Stöver

=== May: Federal law promoting research and universities ===
Choice	Votes	%
For	792,458	43.3
Against	1,037,020	56.7
Blank votes	44,837	–
Invalid votes	1,566	–
Total	1,875,881	100
Registered voters/turnout	3,835,650	48.9
Source: Nohlen & Stöver

=== May: Popular initiative on 12 car-free Sundays a year ===
Choice	Popular vote		Cantons		
Choice	Votes	%	Full	Half	Total
For	678,162	36.3	0	0	0
Against	1,191,204	63.7	19	6	22
Blank votes	13,624	–	–	–	–
Invalid votes	1,367	–	–	–	–
Total	1,884,357	100	19	6	22
Registered voters/turnout	3,835,650	49.1	–	–	–
Source: Nohlen & Stöver

=== September: Creation of Jura canton ===
Choice	Popular vote		Cantons		
Choice	Votes	%	Full	Half	Total
For	1,309,841	82.3	19	6	22
Against	281,873	17.7	0	0	0
Blank votes	24,377	–	–	–	–
Invalid votes	2,372	–	–	–	–
Total	1,618,463	100	19	6	22
Registered voters/turnout	3,848,961	42.0	–	–	–
Source: Nohlen & Stöver

=== December: Dairy farming ===
Choice	Votes	%
For	1,092,586	68.5
Against	502,405	31.5
Blank votes	66,812	–
Invalid votes	2,601	–
Total	1,664,404	100
Registered voters/turnout	3,857,162	43.2
Source: Nohlen & Stöver

=== December: Animal protection law ===
Choice	Votes	%
For	1,339,252	81.7
Against	300,045	18.3
Blank votes	27,717	–
Invalid votes	1,902	–
Total	1,668,916	100
Registered voters/turnout	3,857,162	43.3
Source: Nohlen & Stöver

=== December: Federal law on security ===
Choice	Votes	%
For	723,719	44.0
Against	920,312	56.0
Blank votes	23,294	–
Invalid votes	1,914	–
Total	1,669,239	100
Registered voters/turnout	3,857,162	43.3
Source: Nohlen & Stöver

=== December: Federal law on vocational education and training ===
Choice	Votes	%
For	902,379	56.0
Against	707,746	44.0
Blank votes	52,261	–
Invalid votes	2,360	–
Total	1,664,912	100
Registered voters/turnout	3,857,162	43.2
Source: Nohlen & Stöver
