= List of members of the Swiss Federal Council =

The seven members of the Swiss Federal Council (German: Schweizerischer Bundesrat; French: Conseil fédéral suisse; Italian: Consiglio federale svizzero; Romansh: Cussegl federal svizzer) constitute the federal government of Switzerland and collectively serve as the country's head of state. Each of the seven Federal Councillors heads a department of the Swiss federal administration.

The current Swiss Federal Councillors are: Guy Parmelin (first elected in 2015), Ignazio Cassis (first elected in 2017), Karin Keller-Sutter (first elected in 2018), Albert Rösti (first elected in 2022), Élisabeth Baume-Schneider (first elected in 2022), Beat Jans (first elected in 2023), and Martin Pfister (first elected in 2025).

The members of the Federal Council are elected for a term of four years by both chambers of the federal parliament sitting together as the United Federal Assembly. Each Federal Councillor is elected individually by secret ballot by an absolute majority of votes. People elected to the Federal Council are considered a Federal Councillor even if they decline the election. Accordingly, the five persons who were elected but never assumed office are listed in a separate table below. For the same reason, the principal table only records the date of election and not the date on which the Federal Councillors assumed their office.

Once elected for a four-year-term, Federal Councillors can neither be voted out of office by a motion of no confidence nor can they be impeached. Reelection is possible for an indefinite number of terms. The Federal Assembly has decided not to reelect a sitting Federal Councillor four times and only twice (in 2003 and 2007) since the beginning of the 21st century. In practice, therefore, Federal Councillors serve until they decide to resign and retire to private life, usually after three to five terms of office.

== Members ==
No.	Name	Portrait	Canton	Election	Left office	Department headed	Party	Presidency	Notes	Seq
1	Jonas Furrer	Jonas Furrer	ZH	16 November 1848	25 July 1861	Political • Justice and Police	FDP/PRD	1848–1849; 1852; 1855; 1858	Died in office.	A01
2	Ulrich Ochsenbein		BE	16 November 1848	6 December 1854	Military	FDP/PRD	—	Not reelected.	B01
3	Henri Druey		VD	16 November 1848	29 March 1855	Justice and Police • Political • Finance	FDP/PRD	1850	Died in office.	C01
4	Josef Munzinger		SO	16 November 1848	6 February 1855	Finance • Political • Posts and Construction • Trade and Customs	FDP/PRD	1851	Died in office.	D01
5	Stefano Franscini		TI	16 November 1848	19 July 1857	Home Affairs	FDP/PRD	—	Died in office.	E01
6	Friedrich Frey-Herosé		AG	16 November 1848	31 December 1866	Trade and Customs • Political • Military	FDP/PRD	1854; 1860		F01
7	Wilhelm Matthias Naeff		SG	16 November 1848	31 December 1875	Posts and Construction • Political • Trade and Customs • Posts • Finance and Customs • Railway and Trade	FDP/PRD	1853		G01
8	Jakob Stämpfli		BE	6 December 1854	31 December 1863	Justice and Police • Political • Finance • Military	FDP/PRD	1856; 1859; 1862		B02
9	Constant Fornerod		VD	11 July 1855	31 October 1867	Trade and Customs • Political • Finance • Military	FDP/PRD	1857; 1863; 1867		C02
10	Melchior Josef Martin Knüsel		LU	14 July 1855	31 December 1875	Finance • Trade and Customs • Justice and Police • Political • Home Affairs	FDP/PRD	1861; 1866	Elected after Johann Jakob Stehlin declined the election.	D02
11	Giovanni Battista Pioda		TI	30 July 1857	26 January 1864	Home Affairs	FDP/PRD	—		E02
12	Jakob Dubs		ZH	30 July 1861	28 May 1872	Justice and Police • Political • Home Affairs • Posts	FDP/PRD	1864; 1868; 1870		A02
13	Karl Schenk		BE	12 December 1863	18 July 1895	Home Affairs • Political • Finance • Railway and Trade	FDP/PRD	1865; 1871; 1874; 1878; 1885; 1893	Died in office. Longest serving member.	B03
14	Jean-Jacques Challet-Venel		GE	12 July 1864	7 December 1872	Finance • Posts	FDP/PRD	—	Not reelected.	E03
15	Emil Welti		AG	8 December 1866	31 December 1891	Military • Political • Posts and Telegraph • Justice and Police	FDP/PRD	1869; 1872; 1876; 1880; 1884; 1891		F02
16	Victor Ruffy		VD	6 December 1867	29 December 1869	Finance • Military	FDP/PRD	—	Died in office.	C03
17	Paul Cérésole		VD	1 February 1870	31 December 1875	Finance • Military • Political • Justice and Police	FDP/PRD	1873		C04
18	Johann Jakob Scherer		ZH	12 July 1872	23 December 1878	Finance • Railway and Trade • Political • Military	FDP/PRD	1875	Died in office.	A03
19	Eugène Borel		NE	7 December 1872	31 December 1875	Posts and Telegraph	FDP/PRD	—		E04
20	Joachim Heer		GL	10 December 1875	31 December 1878	Posts and Telegraph • Political • Railway and Trade	FDP/PRD	1877		D03
21	Fridolin Anderwert		TG	10 December 1875	25 December 1880	Justice and Police	FDP/PRD	—	Died in office (committed suicide).	G02
22	Bernhard Hammer		SO	10 December 1875	31 December 1890	Finance and Customs • Political	FDP/PRD	1879; 1889		E05
23	Numa Droz		NE	18 December 1875	18 December 1892	Home Affairs • Trade and Agriculture • Political	FDP/PRD	1881; 1887	Elected after Louis Ruchonnet and Charles Estoppey declined the election.	C05
24	Simeon Bavier		GR	10 December 1878	5 January 1883	Finance and Customs • Posts and Railways • Political	FDP/PRD	1882		D04
25	Wilhelm Hertenstein		ZH	21 March 1879	27 November 1888	Military	FDP/PRD	1888	Died in office.	A04
26	Louis Ruchonnet		VD	3 March 1881	14 September 1893	Trade and Agriculture • Justice and Police • Political	FDP/PRD	1883; 1890	Elected after Karl Hoffmann declined his election. Died in office.	G03
27	Adolf Deucher		TG	10 April 1883	10 July 1912	Justice and Police • Posts and Railways • Trade and Agriculture • Political	FDP/PRD	1886; 1897; 1903; 1909	Died in office.	D05
28	Walter Hauser		ZH	13 December 1888	22 October 1902	Military • Finance and Customs • Political	FDP/PRD	1892; 1900	Died in office.	A05
29	Emil Frey		BL	11 December 1890	11 March 1897	Military	FDP/PRD	1894		E06
30	Josef Zemp		LU	17 December 1891	17 June 1908	Posts and Railways • Political	CVP/PDC	1895; 1902		F03
31	Adrien Lachenal		GE	15 December 1892	31 December 1899	Exterior • Trade, Industry and Agriculture • Home Affairs	FDP/PRD	1896		C06
32	Eugène Ruffy		VD	14 December 1893	31 October 1899	Justice and Police • Home Affairs • Political • Military	FDP/PRD	1898		G04
33	Eduard Müller		BE	16 August 1895	9 November 1919	Justice and Police • Military • Political	FDP/PRD	1899; 1907; 1913	Died in office.	B04
34	Ernst Brenner		BS	25 March 1897	11 March 1911	Justice and Police • Political	FDP/PRD	1901; 1908	Died in office.	E07
35	Robert Comtesse		NE	14 December 1899	4 March 1912	Finance and Customs • Justice and Police • Posts and Railways • Political	FDP/PRD	1904; 1910		C07
36	Marc-Émile Ruchet		VD	14 December 1899	9 July 1912	Home Affairs • Finance and Customs • Political	FDP/PRD	1905; 1911		G05
37	Ludwig Forrer		ZH	11 December 1902	7 December 1917	Trade, Industry and Agriculture • Home Affairs • Political • Military • Justice and Police • Posts and Railways	FDP/PRD	1906; 1912		A06
38	Josef Anton Schobinger		LU	17 June 1908	27 November 1911	Justice and Police • Trade, Industry and Agriculture • Finance and Customs • Home Affairs	CVP/PDC	—		F04
39	Arthur Hoffmann		SG	4 April 1911	19 June 1917	Justice and Police • Military • Political	FDP/PRD	1914		E08
40	Giuseppe Motta		TI	14 December 1911	23 January 1940	Finance and Customs • Political	CVP/PDC	1915; 1920; 1927; 1932; 1937	Died in office.	F05
41	Louis Perrier		NE	12 March 1912	16 May 1913	Posts and Railways • Home Affairs	FDP/PRD	—		C08
42	Camille Decoppet		VD	17 July 1912	7 November 1919	Home Affairs • Justice and Police • Military	FDP/PRD	1916		G06
43	Edmund Schulthess		AG	17 July 1912	15 April 1935	Trade, Industry and Agriculture	FDP/PRD	1917; 1921; 1928; 1933		D06
44	Felix Calonder		GR	12 June 1913	12 February 1920	Home Affairs • Political	FDP/PRD	1918		C09
45	Gustave Ador		GE	26 June 1917	31 December 1919	Political • Home Affairs	LPS/PLS	1919		E09
46	Robert Haab		ZH	13 December 1917	31 December 1929	Posts and Railways	FDP/PRD	1922; 1929		A07
47	Karl Scheurer		BE	11 December 1919	14 November 1929	Military	FDP/PRD	1923	Died in office.	B05
48	Ernest Chuard		VD	11 December 1919	31 December 1928	Home Affairs	FDP/PRD	1924		G07
49	Jean-Marie Musy		FR	11 December 1919	30 April 1934	Finance and Customs	CVP/PDC	1925; 1930		E10
50	Heinrich Häberlin		TG	12 February 1920	12 March 1934	Justice and Police	FDP/PRD	1926; 1931		C10
51	Marcel Pilet-Golaz		VD	13 December 1928	7 November 1944	Home Affairs • Posts and Railways • Political	FDP/PRD	1934; 1940		G08
52	Rudolf Minger		BE	12 December 1929	31 December 1940	Military	SVP/UDC	1935		B06
53	Albert Meyer		ZH	12 December 1929	31 December 1938	Home Affairs • Finance and Customs	FDP/PRD	1936		A08
54	Johannes Baumann		AR	22 March 1934	31 December 1940	Justice and Police	FDP/PRD	1938		C11
55	Philipp Etter		ZG	28 March 1934	19 November 1959	Home Affairs	CVP/PDC	1939; 1942; 1947; 1953		E11
56	Hermann Obrecht		SO	4 April 1935	20 June 1940	Economic Affairs	FDP/PRD	—		D07
57	Ernst Wetter		ZH	15 December 1938	31 December 1943	Finance and Customs	FDP/PRD	1941		A09
58	Enrico Celio		TI	22 February 1940	23 June 1950	Posts and Railways	CVP/PDC	1943; 1948		F06
59	Walther Stampfli		SO	18 July 1940	18 November 1947	Economic Affairs	FDP/PRD	1944		D08
60	Eduard von Steiger		BE	10 December 1940	9 November 1951	Justice and Police	SVP/UDC	1945; 1951		B07
61	Karl Kobelt		SG	10 December 1940	5 November 1954	Military	FDP/PRD	1946; 1952		C12
62	Ernst Nobs		ZH	15 December 1943	13 December 1951	Finance and Customs	SPS/PSS	1949		A10
63	Max Petitpierre		NE	14 December 1944	30 June 1961	Political	FDP/PRD	1950; 1955; 1960		G09
64	Rodolphe Rubattel		VD	11 December 1947	1 November 1954	Economic Affairs	FDP/PRD	1954		D09
65	Josef Escher		VS	14 September 1950	26 November 1954	Posts and Railways	CVP/PDC	—		F07
66	Markus Feldmann		BE	13 December 1951	3 November 1958	Justice and Police	SVP/UDC	1956		B08
67	Max Weber		ZH	13 December 1951	8 December 1953	Finance and Customs	SPS/PSS	—		A11
68	Hans Streuli		ZH	22 December 1953	19 November 1959	Finance and Customs	FDP/PRD	1957		A12
69	Thomas Holenstein		SG	16 December 1954	20 November 1959	Economic Affairs	CVP/PDC	1958		F08
70	Paul Chaudet		VD	16 December 1954	28 November 1966	Military	FDP/PRD	1959; 1962		D10
71	Giuseppe Lepori		TI	16 December 1954	24 November 1959	Posts and Railways	CVP/PDC	—		C13
72	Friedrich Traugott Wahlen		BE	11 December 1958	31 December 1965	Justice and Police • Economic Affairs • Political	SVP/UDC	1961		B09
73	Jean Bourgknecht		FR	17 December 1959	3 September 1962	Finance and Research	CVP/PDC	—		E12
74	Willy Spühler		ZH	17 December 1959	31 January 1970	Posts and Railways • Political	SPS/PSS	1963; 1968		A13
75	Ludwig von Moos		OW	17 December 1959	31 December 1971	Justice and Police	CVP/PDC	1964; 1969		F09
76	Hans-Peter Tschudi		BS	17 December 1959	31 December 1973	Home Affairs	SPS/PSS	1965; 1970		C14
77	Hans Schaffner		AG	15 June 1961	31 December 1969	Economic Affairs	FDP/PRD	1966		G10
78	Roger Bonvin		VS	27 September 1962	31 December 1973	Finance and Customs • Transport, Energy, Communications	CVP/PDC	1967; 1973		E13
79	Rudolf Gnägi		BE	8 December 1965	31 December 1979	Transport, Energy, Communications • Military	SVP/UDC	1971; 1976		B10
80	Nello Celio		TI	15 December 1966	31 December 1973	Military • Finance and Customs	FDP/PRD	1972		D11
81	Pierre Graber		NE	10 December 1969	31 January 1978	Political	SPS/PSS	1975		A14
82	Ernst Brugger		ZH	10 December 1969	31 January 1978	Economic Affairs	FDP/PRD	1974		G11
83	Kurt Furgler		SG	8 December 1971	31 December 1986	Justice and Police • Economic Affairs	CVP/PDC	1977; 1981; 1985		F10
84	Willi Ritschard		SO	5 December 1973	3 October 1983	Transport, Energy, Communications • Finance	SPS/PSS	1978	Died in office.	C15
85	Hans Hürlimann		ZG	5 December 1973	31 December 1982	Home Affairs	CVP/PDC	1979		E14
86	Georges-André Chevallaz		VD	5 December 1973	31 December 1983	Finance and Customs • Military	FDP/PRD	1980		D12
87	Fritz Honegger		ZH	7 December 1977	31 December 1982	Economic Affairs	FDP/PRD	1982		G12
88	Pierre Aubert		NE	7 December 1977	31 December 1987	Political	SPS/PSS	1983; 1987		A15
89	Leon Schlumpf		GR	5 December 1979	31 December 1987	Transport, Energy, Communications	SVP/UDC	1984		B11
90	Alphons Egli		LU	8 December 1982	31 December 1986	Home Affairs	CVP/PDC	1986		E15
91	Rudolf Friedrich		ZH	8 December 1982	20 October 1984	Justice and Police	FDP/PRD	—		G13
92	Otto Stich		SO	7 December 1983	31 October 1995	Finance	SPS/PSS	1988; 1994		C16
93	Jean-Pascal Delamuraz		VD	7 December 1983	30 March 1998	Military • Economic Affairs	FDP/PRD	1989; 1996		D13
94	Elisabeth Kopp		ZH	2 October 1984	12 January 1989	Justice and Police	FDP/PRD	—	First female Federal Councillor.	G14
95	Arnold Koller		AI	10 December 1986	13 January 1999	Justice and Police • Military	CVP/PDC	1990; 1997		F11
96	Flavio Cotti		TI	10 December 1986	13 January 1999	Home Affairs • Foreign Affairs	CVP/PDC	1991; 1998		E16
97	René Felber		NE	9 December 1987	31 March 1993	Foreign Affairs	SPS/PSS	1992		A16
98	Adolf Ogi		BE	9 December 1987	31 December 2000	Transport, Energy, Communications • Military	SVP/UDC	1993; 2000		B12
99	Kaspar Villiger		LU	1 February 1989	31 December 2003	Military • Finance	FDP/PRD	1995; 2002		G15
100	Ruth Dreifuss		GE	10 March 1993	31 December 2002	Home Affairs	SPS/PSS	1999	Elected after Francis Matthey declined the election.	A17
101	Moritz Leuenberger		ZH	27 September 1995	1 November 2010	Transport, Energy, Communications	SPS/PSS	2001; 2006		C17
102	Pascal Couchepin		VS	11 March 1998	31 October 2009	Economic Affairs • Home Affairs	FDP/PRD	2003; 2008		D14
103	Ruth Metzler		AI	11 March 1999	31 December 2003	Justice and Police	CVP/PDC	—	Not reelected.	F12
104	Joseph Deiss		FR	11 March 1999	31 July 2006	Foreign Affairs • Economic Affairs	CVP/PDC	2004		E17
105	Samuel Schmid		BE	6 December 2000	31 December 2008	Defence, Civil Protection and Sport	SVP/UDC	2005	Switched to the BDP/PBD in 2008.	B13
106	Micheline Calmy-Rey		GE	4 December 2002	31 December 2011	Foreign Affairs	SPS/PSS	2007; 2011		A18
107	Christoph Blocher		ZH	10 December 2003	31 December 2007	Justice and Police	SVP/UDC	—	Not reelected.	F13
108	Hans-Rudolf Merz		AR	10 December 2003	1 November 2010	Finance	FDP/PRD	2009		G16
109	Doris Leuthard		AG	14 June 2006	31 December 2018	Economic Affairs • Environment, Transport, Energy and Communications	CVP/PDC	2010; 2017		E18
110	Eveline Widmer-Schlumpf		GR	12 December 2007	31 December 2015	Justice and Police • Finance	BDP/PBD	2012	First elected for the SVP/UDC, switched in 2008.	F14
111	Ueli Maurer		ZH	10 December 2008	31 December 2022	Defence, Civil Protection and Sport • Finance	SVP/UDC	2013; 2019		B14
112	Didier Burkhalter		NE	16 September 2009	31 October 2017	Home Affairs • Foreign Affairs	FDP/PLR	2014		D15
113	Simonetta Sommaruga		BE	22 September 2010	31 December 2022	Justice and Police • Environment, Transport, Energy and Communications	SPS/PSS	2015; 2020		C18
114	Johann Schneider-Ammann		BE	22 September 2010	31 December 2018	Economic Affairs	FDP/PLR	2016		G17
115	Alain Berset		FR	14 December 2011	31 December 2023	Home Affairs	SPS/PSS	2018; 2023		A19
116	Guy Parmelin		VD	9 December 2015	Incumbent	Defence, Civil Protection and Sport • Economic Affairs, Education and Research	SVP/UDC	2021; 2026		F15
117	Ignazio Cassis		TI	20 September 2017	Incumbent	Foreign Affairs	FDP/PLR	2022		D16
118	Viola Amherd		VS	5 December 2018	31 March 2025	Defence, Civil Protection and Sport	CVP/PDC	2024	The CVP/PDC merged into The Centre in 2021.	E19
119	Karin Keller-Sutter		SG	5 December 2018	Incumbent	Justice and Police • Finance	FDP/PLR	2025		G18
120	Albert Rösti		BE	7 December 2022	Incumbent	Environment, Transport, Energy and Communications	SVP/UDC	–		B15
121	Élisabeth Baume-Schneider		JU	7 December 2022	Incumbent	Justice and Police・Home Affairs	SPS/PSS	–		C19
122	Beat Jans		BS	13 December 2023	Incumbent	Justice and Police	SPS/PSS	–		A20
123	Martin Pfister		ZG	12 March 2025	Incumbent	Defence, Civil Protection and Sport	Centre	–		E20

Legend:
Free Democratic Party (FDP/PRD) after 1894; previously a more or less coherent group of Liberals, Radicals and Democrats. In January 2009, it merged with the Liberal Party (LPS/PLS) and became FDP.The Liberals.
Christian Democratic People's Party (CVP/PDC); in 2021, it merged into The Centre.
Liberal Party (LPS/PLS); since January 2009, the party has merged with the Free Democratic Party (FDP/PRD) in order to form FDP.The Liberals.
Swiss People's Party (SVP/UDC) after 1971; previously the Party of Farmers, Traders and Independents (BGB/PAI) and associated minor parties.
Social Democratic Party (SPS/PSS)
Conservative Democratic Party (BDP/PBD)

The Federal Councillors currently serving are indicated with bold type.

== Members who declined their election ==
Five people have declined their election to the Federal Council by the Federal Assembly. Their number here is that of the Federal Councillor in the list above who was later elected in their place.

No.	Name	Canton	Election	Party	Notes
(10)	Johann Jakob Stehlin	BS	11 July 1855	FDP/PRD	
(23)	Louis Ruchonnet	VD	10 December 1875	FDP/PRD	Later elected as the 26th Councillor.
(23)	Charles Estoppey	VD	18 December 1875	FDP/PRD	
(26)	Karl Hoffmann	SG	22 February 1881	FDP/PRD	
(100)	Francis Matthey	NE	3 March 1993	SPS/PSS	
