= Johann Jakob Scherer =

Swiss politician (1825-1878)

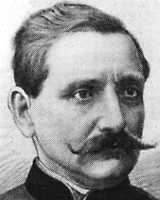
Johann Jakob Scherer

Johann Jakob Scherer (10 November 1825 – 23 December 1878) was a Swiss politician.

He was elected to the Swiss Federal Council on 12 July 1872 and died in office on 23 December 1878. He was affiliated to the Free Democratic Party of Switzerland.

During his time in office he held the following departments:

- Department of Finance (1872–1873)
- Department of Railway and Trade (1873–1874)
- Political Department (1875)
- Military Department (1876–1878)

He was President of the Confederation in 1875.

Political offices
Preceded by Jakob Dubs	Member of the Swiss Federal Council; 1872–1878	Succeeded by Wilhelm Hertenstein
