= Giovanni Battista Pioda =

Swiss politician (1808–1882)

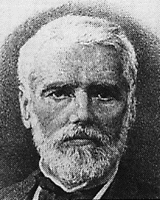
Giovanni Battista Pioda

Giovanni Battista Pioda (4 October 1808 in Locarno – 3 November 1882) was a Swiss politician and member of the Swiss Federal Council (1857–1864).

He was elected to the Federal Council of Switzerland on 30 July 1857 and resigned on 26 January 1864. He was affiliated with the Free Democratic Party of Switzerland. During his time in office, he held the Department of Home Affairs.

Preceded by Johann M. Hungerbühler	President of the National Council; 1853/1854	Succeeded by Jakob Dubs
Preceded by Stefano Franscini	Member of the Swiss Federal Council; 1857–1864	Succeeded by Jean-Jacques Challet-Venel
