= Fridolin Anderwert =

Swiss politician

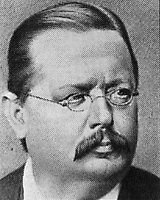
Fridolin Anderwert

Fridolin Anderwert (19 September 1828, in Frauenfeld – 25 December 1880) was a Swiss politician. After attending school in Tägerwilen, Frauenfeld, and Konstanz, he initially studied history and philosophy at the University of Leipzig. He subsequently studied law at Ruprecht Karl University in Heidelberg and Friedrich Wilhelm University in Berlin. In 1851, he began practicing law in Frauenfeld, and from 1853 to 1856, he served as a district judge.

He was elected to the Swiss Federal Council on 10 December 1875 and was a member of the council until 25 December 1880. He was affiliated to the Democratic Left, which later developed into the Social-Political Group.

During his time in office, he held the Department of Justice and Police and was Vice-President of the Swiss Confederation in 1880.

On 7 December 1880 he was elected President of the Swiss Confederation for the year 1881. Immediately after the election, a nasty campaign against him broke out in the press, in particular about the eating habits of the obese bachelor, along with rumors that he was a regular visitor to brothels. Drawn by physical exhaustion and severe depression, Anderwert killed himself on Christmas Day 1880 in the "Kleine Schanze", a small park next to the Houses of Parliament. The only published sentence of his farewell letter states: "They want a victim, they shall have it."

Preceded by Joachim Heer	President of the National Council; 1870/1871	Succeeded by Rudolf Brunner
Preceded by Wilhelm Matthias Naeff	Member of the Swiss Federal Council; 1875–1880	Succeeded by Louis Ruchonnet
