= Jean-Jacques Challet-Venel =

Swiss politician

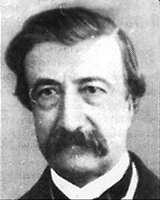
Jean-Jacques Challet-Venel

Jean-Jacques Challet-Venel (11 May 1811, Geneva – 6 August 1893) was a Swiss politician and member of the Swiss Federal Council (1864–1872).

Challet was elected to the Federal Council of Switzerland on 12 July 1864 as the first member from the Canton of Geneva. He handed over office on 31 December 1872 after being voted out of office. He was affiliated with the Free Democratic Party of Switzerland. During his time in office he held the following departments:

- Department of Finance (1864–1867)
- Department of Posts (1868)
- Department of Finance (1869)
- Department of Posts (1870–1872)

As head of the Department of Posts, he was the driving force behind the creation of the Universal Postal Union, the third extant intergovernmental organisation, in 1874 in Bern.

== See also ==
- Plainpalais

Preceded by Giovanni Battista Pioda	Member of the Swiss Federal Council; 1864–1872	Succeeded by Eugène Borel
