= René Felber =

Swiss politician (1933–2020)

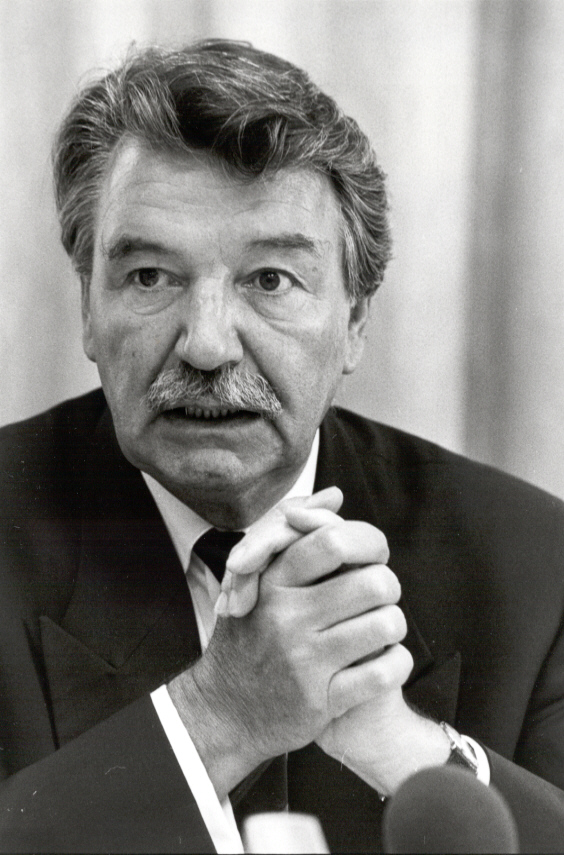
- Felber in 1990

President of Switzerland
- In office 1 January 1992 – 31 December 1992
- Preceded by: Flavio Cotti
- Succeeded by: Adolf Ogi

Member of the Swiss Federal Council
- In office 1988–1993
- Preceded by: Pierre Aubert
- Succeeded by: Ruth Dreifuss

Personal details
- Born: 14 March 1933 Bienne, Switzerland
- Died: 18 October 2020 (aged 87)

René Felber (14 March 1933 – 18 October 2020) was a Swiss politician. He was a member of the Swiss Federal Council from 1987 to 1993. In 1992, he served as the president of Switzerland.

== Personal life ==
Born 1933 in Bienne, Felber was a teacher in Boudevilliers and Le Locle (canton of Neuchâtel).

Felber died on 18 October 2020 at the age of 87.

== Political career ==
He was mayor of Le Locle from 1964 to 1980 (in charge of gas and electricity supply and then of Finance), member of the Cantonal Parliament of Neuchâtel (1965–1976). He sat in the National Council from 1967 to 1981 when he became a member of the Conseil d'Etat (State Council) of the canton of Neuchâtel in charge of the Finance Department until his election to the Federal Council. In 1980/81, he was the floor leader of the Social Democratic Party in the Federal Parliament.

He was elected to the Swiss Federal Council on 9 December 1987 as member of the Canton of Neuchâtel and for the Social Democratic Party.

During his time in office, he headed the Federal Department of Foreign Affairs and was President of the Confederation in 1992. Felber fought for Swiss membership in the European Economic Area, a proposal that was narrowly defeated in a referendum on 6 December 1992.

He resigned from the council on 31 March 1993 for health reasons.

Political offices
Preceded by Pierre Aubert	Member of the Swiss Federal Council; 1987–1993	Succeeded by Ruth Dreifuss
