= Charles Estoppey =

Swiss politician

Charles Estoppey (15 February 1820 in Payerne – 30 October 1888 in Saint-Légier) was a Swiss politician of the Free Democratic Party.

Born in Payerne, Charles Estoppey was the son of Jean-Daniel Estoppey, a school teacher, and married to Elisabeth Marguerite Böhlen. He studied law in Lausanne between 1840 and 1844 and then became judge in Payerne between 1845 and 1848.

He was elected State Councillor of the Canton of Vaud between 1866 and 1888, at the National Council between 1852 and 1863, and at the Council of States between 1867 and 1873, and again between 1875 and 1888.

In 1875, he was elected to the Swiss Federal Council, However, he stood down and was replaced by Numa Droz
