= Eugène Borel =

Member of the Swiss Federal Council

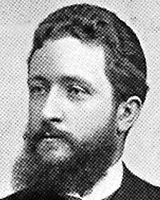
- Born: 17 June 1835; Neuchâtel, Switzerland
- Died: 14 June 1892 (aged 56); Bern, Switzerland

Eugène Borel (17 June 1835 – 14 June 1892) was a Swiss politician and member of the Swiss Federal Council (1872–1875).

== Early life ==
He was born in Neuchâtel to François-Victor and Louise Borel. He was educated at the humanistic high school in Neuchâtel and then studied the law in Munich and Heidelberg. After finishing his studies he worked as a lawyer in Neuchâtel. In 1861 he married Marie Gullaume.

Borel became an auditor and translator in the National Council of Switzerland in 1860. In 1870 he was elected inquisitor for western Switzerland by the federal court.

== Politics ==
In 1857 he was elected into the legislative branch (Generalrat) of the city of Neuchâtel for the radical party, which is now the Free Democratic Party of Switzerland. He was elected to the city council in 1864, to the Grand Council of the canton of Neuchâtel and in 1865 he became a member of the State Council (Staatsrat) where he headed the military department from 1865 to 1870 and the department of justice from 1870 to 1872.

In 1865 he was elected to the Swiss Council of States which he presided in 1869. He was elected to the Federal Council of Switzerland on 7 December 1872 with 37 years. During his office time he held the Department of Posts and Telegraph. He was a key player in the founding of the Universal Postal Union (UPU) with the Treaty of Bern in 1874. Borel became the first directory of the UPU and therefore resigned from his job as a federal councillor and handed over office on 31 December 1875 to his successor.

In 1889 there was a big unrest in Ticino. Borel was sent there and, together with troops from Zürich, he managed to restore order.

Borel headed the UPU until his death in 1892.

Quai Eugène-Borel in Neuchâtel is named for him.

== Works ==
- Guillaume, Louis; Borel, Eugène (1863). Notice historique sur les sociétés de tir dans le canton de Neuchâtel (in French). Neuchâtel: Impr. Montandon.
- Borel, Eugène; Guillaume, Louis (1863). Frédéric Roessinger: esquisse biographique; suivie d'un appendice relatif à la captivité de Henri-Louis Dubois, de Travers, mort dans les prisons de Neuchâtel (in French). Neuchâtel: Impr. Montandon.

Preceded by Arnold Otto Aepli	President of the Council of States; 1869	Succeeded by Johann Weber
Preceded by Jean-Jacques Challet-Venel	Member of the Swiss Federal Council; 1872–1875	Succeeded by Bernhard Hammer
