= Wilhelm Hertenstein =

Swiss politician (1825–1888)

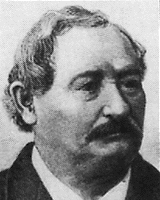
Wilhelm Friedrich Hertenstein, member of the Swiss Federal Council

Wilhelm Friederich Hertenstein (5 May 1825, in Kyburg – 27 November 1888) was a Swiss politician.

Hertenstein was trained to manage forestries, and in 1847 he received the diploma of the Saxonian forest schools. From 1855 until 1872, he led the Canton of Zurich's forestry department which was located in Fehraltorf. During most these years, he was a politician in the state's legislative body. In the Swiss military, he served as an artillery officer, with a deployment during the Sonderbund War of 1847, and in 1872, he was made a colonel and also elected to the government of the Canton of Zurich. After a short stint in the Swiss Council of States beginning in 1878, Hertenstein was elected to the Swiss Federal Council on 21 March 1879 and died in office on 27 November 1888 following an emergency amputation of his leg. He was affiliated to the Free Democratic Party of Switzerland. During his office time he held the Military Department and was President of the Confederation in 1888. His funeral was a show of Swiss national unity.

Hertenstein died while in office as President of the Confederation and is so far the only holder of this office who did not finish his term.

Preceded by Johann Jakob Scherer	Member of the Swiss Federal Council; 1879–1888	Succeeded by Walter Hauser
