= Simeon Bavier =

Swiss construction engineer and politician (1825–1896)

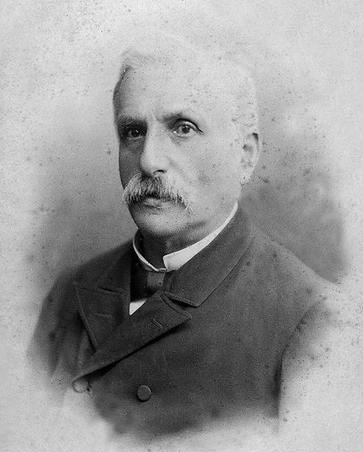
Bavier in 1890

Simeon Bavier (16 September 1825 in Chur – 27 January 1896 in Basel) was a Swiss politician who served as member of the Swiss Federal Council (1878–1883).

Bavier was trained as an underground construction engineer at the Karlsruhe Institute of Technology and the University of Stuttgart from 1841 until 1844, and was instrumental in building some of the alpine roads in Grisons. After 1853, he focused on building railway lines both in Switzerland and abroad. Coming from a family that was involved in the transport business, he was a staunch proponent of the Ostalpenbahn, a transalpine railway connection through Grisons and over the Lukmanier Pass, which would have fundamentally changed the economic situation of Grisons.

From 1863 until 1878, he represented both the liberals of Grisons in the Swiss National Council. When he began to support the federal subsidies for the Gotthard railway, his image improved and he was seen less as a one-sided Ostalpenbahn supporter.

He was elected to the national government, the Swiss Federal Council, on 10 December 1878 and resigned on 5 January 1883. He was affiliated with the Liberal Centre, which later developed into the Liberal Party of Switzerland. During his time in office he held the following departments:

- Department of Finance (1879)
- Department of Posts and Railways (1880–1881)
- Political Department (1882) as President of the Confederation

He was President of the Confederation in 1882.

Political offices
Preceded by Joachim Heer	Member of the Swiss Federal Council; 1878–1883	Succeeded by Adolf Deucher
