= Alphons Egli =

Swiss politician (1924–2016)

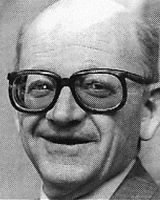

Member of the Swiss Federal Council
- In office 1983–1987
- Preceded by: Hans Hürlimann
- Succeeded by: Flavio Cotti

President of Switzerland
- In office 1 January 1986 – 31 December 1986
- Preceded by: Kurt Furgler
- Succeeded by: Pierre Aubert

Personal details
- Born: Alphons Blasius Egli; 8 October 1924 Lucerne, Switzerland
- Died: 5 August 2016 (aged 91) Lucerne, Switzerland
- Party: Christian Democratic People's Party
- Children: 3

Alphons Blasius Egli colloquially Alphons Egli (8 October 1924 – 5 August 2016) was a Swiss attorney and politician who most notably served on the Federal Council (Switzerland) between 1983 and 1987 and as President of the Swiss Confederation in 1986 for the Christian Democratic People's Party.

== Early life and education ==
Alphons Blasius Egli was born 8 October 1924 in Lucerne, Switzerland, the fifth of six children, to Gotthard Egli (1884–1979), an attorney and politician, and Lea Egli (née Amrhyn). He was raised in a Catholic family on Musegg (abutting the old city walls). Two of his siblings died in early childhood. He had three surviving sisters; Lea Korner (née Egli), Elisabeth Egli and Beatrix Egli.

He was educated in the local schools upon completition of primary school. He then was sent to boarding schools, including Engelberg Abbey School and the Abbey School of Saint-Maurice d'Agaune in Valais. He completed his Matura at the Cantonal School of Lucerne. He then studied Jurisprudence at the University of Zurich, the University of Berne and the Pontifical Gregorian University in Rome, Italy.

== Political career ==
He was affiliated to the Christian Democratic People's Party of Switzerland. During his time in office he held the Federal Department of Home Affairs and was President of the Confederation in 1986. Egli was a citizen of Entlebuch and Lucerne.

== Personal life ==
Egli was married to Heidi Mäder, a daughter of Emil Mäder (1875–1936), of St. Gallen, who also served on the National Council (Switzerland). They had three children;

- Franziska Egli, married Pierre Peyer, with issue.
- Barbara Egli, married Werner Pfäffli, no issue.
- Cyrill Egli, married Gabriela "Gabi" Bucher, with issue.

He died on 5 August 2016, aged 91.

Preceded by Hans Hürlimann	Member of the Swiss Federal Council; 1983–1986	Succeeded by Flavio Cotti
