= Rudolf Friedrich =

Swiss lawyer and politician

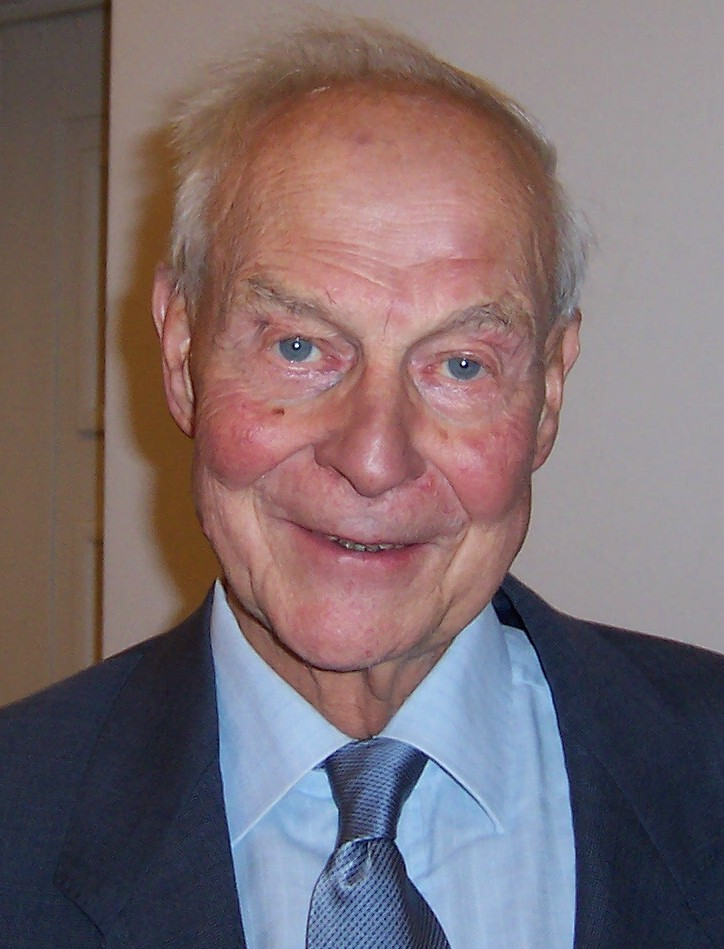
- Rudolf Friedrich in 2007

Head of the Department of Justice and Police
- In office 8 December 1982 – 20 October 1984
- Succeeded by: Elisabeth Kopp

Member of the National Council
- In office 1 December 1975 – 8 December 1982

Personal details
- Born: Rudolf Heinrich Friedrich; 4 July 1923 Winterthur, Zürich, Switzerland
- Died: 15 October 2013 (aged 90) Winterthur, Zürich, Switzerland
- Party: Free Democratic Party
- Occupation: Attorney, politician

Military service
- Allegiance: Switzerland
- Branch/service: Swiss Armed Forces
- Years of service: 1942-1945
- Rank: Active duty

Rudolf Heinrich Friedrich (/frəədrɪk/; Free-Drick 4 July 1923 – 15 October 2013) was a Swiss attorney and politician. He served as a member of the Federal Council (Switzerland) for the Free Democratic Party from 1982 to 1984, where he held the position as Head of the Federal Department of Justice and Police. He resigned from this position for health reasons. Previously, Friedrich served as a member of the National Council from 1975 to 1982.

His legislative accomplishments include Lex Friedrich, a Federal Restriction for the Acquisition of Real Estate by Foreign Persons of 16 December 1984 and related to federal and cantonal legislations.

== Early life and education ==
Friedrich was born on 4 July 1923 in Winterthur, Switzerland to Jean-Jacques and Ida Fanny (née Sulzer) Friedrich. His father was a paediatrician. His mother hailed from the old, influential Sulzer industrial family. Friedrich completed his law studies at the University of Zurich with a licentiate degree. He then completed military training and became a member of the Officers Society in Winterthur. During World War II, he served in active duty in the Mountain Corps of the Swiss Armed Forces.

== Career ==
In 1957, after collecting experience at various courts, notary public offices and private companies, Friedrich opened his own law firm in Winterthur. Early in his career, he became involved with the Free Democratic Party. Between 1962 and 1975, he served as city councilor of Winterthur. Between 1967 and 1977, he was a member of the Cantonal Council of Zurich.

== Politics ==
He was elected to the Swiss Federal Council on 8 December 1982 and, for health reasons, resigned his office on 20 October 1984. He was affiliated with the Free Democratic Party. During his office time, he held the Federal Department of Justice and Police.

== Personal life ==
Friedrich was never married and had no children.

Preceded by Fritz Honegger	Member of the Swiss Federal Council; 1982–1984	Succeeded by Elisabeth Kopp
