= Ernst Brugger =

Swiss politician (1914–1998)

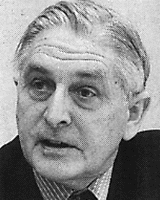

Ernst Brugger (10 March 1914, in Bellinzona – 20 June 1998) was a Swiss politician and member of the Swiss Federal Council (1969–1978).

He was elected to the Federal Council on 10 December 1969 and handed over office on 31 January 1978. He was affiliated to the Free Democratic Party.

During his office time he headed up the Federal Department of Economic Affairs and was President of the Confederation in 1974.

Preceded by Hans Schaffner	Member of the Swiss Federal Council; 1969–1978	Succeeded by Fritz Honegger
