= Pierre Aubert =

Swiss politician (1927–2016)

- Aubert in 1971

President of the Swiss Confederation
- In office 1 January 1987 – 31 December 1987
- Preceded by: Alphons Egli
- Succeeded by: Otto Stich
- In office 1 January 1983 – 31 December 1983
- Preceded by: Fritz Honegger
- Succeeded by: Leon Schlumpf

Member of the Swiss Federal Council
- In office 1 February 1978 – 31 December 1987
- Preceded by: Pierre Graber
- Succeeded by: René Felber

Personal details
- Born: 3 March 1927 La Chaux-de-Fonds, Switzerland
- Died: 8 June 2016 (aged 89) Neuchâtel, Switzerland
- Party: Social Democratic

Pierre Aubert (French pronunciation: [pjɛʁ obɛːʁ]; 3 March 1927 – 8 June 2016) was a Swiss politician, lawyer and member of the Swiss Federal Council (1978–1987) from the canton of Neuchâtel. He was a member of the Social Democratic Party (SP/PS).

== Political career ==
He was elected to the Swiss Federal Council on 7 December 1977 as member of the Social Democratic Party from the canton of Neuchâtel. He handed over office on 31 December 1987. After earning a law degree, he became an attorney-at-law in 1953. He began his political career as a member of the City Parliament of La Chaux-de-Fonds (1960–68), then served the Cantonal Parliament of Neuchâtel (1961–75) and was the President of the latter legislative body from 1969 until 70. Elected to the Council of Statesin 1975, he sat in this chamber of the Federal Parliament until his election to the Federal Council in 1977. From 1974 to 1977, he belonged to the Parliamentary Assembly of the Council of Europe and was rapporteur for the admission of Portugal. He was the chancellor of the University of Neuchâtel from 1971 to 1977.

During his time in office, Aubert held the portfolio of the Political Department in 1978 and from 1979 to 1987 after it was renamed to "Federal Department of Foreign Affairs". He was President of the Confederation twice: in 1983 and in 1987. He stood for a Swiss active policy in general and in the Human rights field in particular. Aubert made 55 foreign trips, 39 of which were official trips. Aubert visited four African countries and signed a declaration against apartheid in Nigeria in 1979. He was the first Swiss foreign minister to establish contacts with the PLO leadership when he received Faruk Kaddhumi in July 1980 in Bern. He led the unsuccessful campaign to join the United Nations in 1986 (only 24% of the voters were in favour).

Political offices
Preceded by Pierre Graber	Member of the Swiss Federal Council; 1978–1987	Succeeded by René Felber
