= Kurt Furgler =

Swiss politician

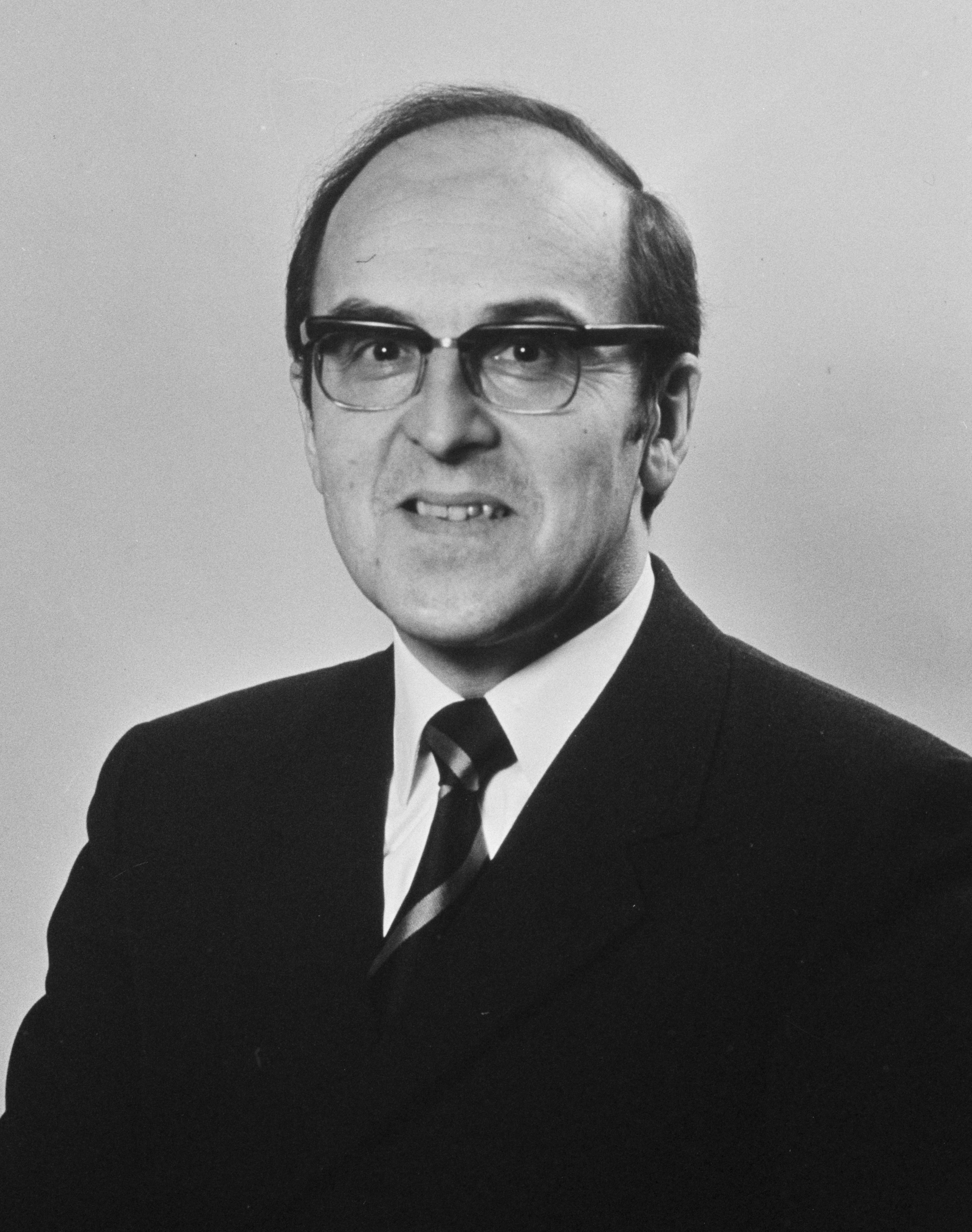

Member of the Swiss Federal Council
- In office 1 January 1972 – 31 December 1986
- Preceded by: Ludwig von Moos
- Succeeded by: Arnold Koller

President of Switzerland
- In office 1 January 1985 – 31 December 1985
- Preceded by: Leon Schlumpf
- Succeeded by: Alphons Egli
- In office 1 January 1981 – 31 December 1981
- Preceded by: Georges-André Chevallaz
- Succeeded by: Fritz Honegger
- In office 1 January 1977 – 31 December 1977
- Preceded by: Rudolf Gnägi
- Succeeded by: Willy Ritschard

Personal details
- Born: 24 June 1924 St. Gallen, Switzerland
- Died: 23 July 2008 (aged 84) St. Gallen, Switzerland
- Party: Christian Democratic People's Party of Switzerland
- Education: University of Fribourg, Graduate Institute of International Studies

Kurt Furgler (24 June 1924 – 23 July 2008) was a Swiss politician and member of the Swiss Federal Council (1972–1986).

He was elected to the Federal Council of Switzerland on 8 December 1971 and handed over office on 31 December 1986. He was affiliated to the Christian Democratic People's Party of Switzerland.

During his office time he held the following departments:

- Federal Department of Justice and Police (1972–1982)
- Federal Department of Economic Affairs (1983–1986)

He was President of the Confederation three times in 1977, 1981 and 1985.

Kurt Furgler was born and raised in St. Gallen, Switzerland. He studied Jurisprudence in Fribourg, Zürich, and Geneva, and was an avid handball player during his youth. In 1948, he obtained his license to practice law in St. Gallen. As a conservative centrist in the Federal Council of Switzerland, he advocated equal rights for women, and initiated economic reforms and modernized immigration and Swiss family law.

During his presidency, he argued for the European integration of Switzerland, and in 1982, signed the Luxembourg Declaration, which called for a closer cooperation between the European Union and the European Free Trade Association (EFTA). Dr. Furgler demanded a strong central government but failed to establish a Swiss federal police due to strong opposition from the left and confederated forces of the right.

In September 1982, he was the head of the special task force for the hostage situation in the Polish embassy in Bern. Controversially, he approved the clandestine copying of Polish diplomatic documents.

In November 1985, he asserted his significant representative role in international relations when he welcomed the American president Ronald Reagan and General Secretary of the Communist Party of the Soviet Union Mikhail Gorbachev at the Geneva Summit.

Kurt Furgler resigned unexpectedly in 1986, but continued to serve in a number of committees, including the Club of Rome, InterAction Council, and the International Olympic Committee.

| Preceded by Ludwig von Moos | Member of the Swiss Federal Council; 1972–1986 | Succeeded by Arnold Koller |
