= Fritz Honegger =

Swiss politician (1917–1999)

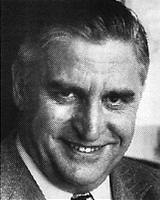
Fritz Honegger

Fritz Honegger (25 July 1917 – 4 March 1999) was a Swiss politician.

He was elected to the Swiss Federal Council on 7 December 1977 and handed over office on 31 December 1982. He was affiliated to the Free Democratic Party.

During his time in office he held the Federal Department of Economic Affairs and was President of the Confederation in 1982.

Preceded by Ernst Brugger	Member of the Swiss Federal Council; 1977–1982	Succeeded by Rudolf Friedrich
