= Leon Schlumpf =

Swiss politician (1925–2012)

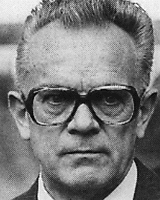
Leon Schlumpf

Leon Schlumpf (3 February 1925 – 7 July 2012) was a Swiss politician and a member of the Swiss Federal Council (1979–1987).

Schlumpf was born in Felsberg. He was elected to the Federal Council on 5 December 1979 as a member of the Swiss People's Party (SVP) from the Canton of Graubünden (Grisons). He subsequently handed over office on 31 December 1987.

During his time in office, he held the Federal Department of Transport, Communications and Energy and was President of the Confederation in 1984.

Schlumpf died on 7 July 2012 in Chur, aged 87. He was the father of Eveline Widmer-Schlumpf, member of the cantonal government of Graubünden (Grisons), who was herself elected to the Federal Council on 12 December 2007.

Political offices
Preceded by Rudolf Gnägi	Member of the Swiss Federal Council; 1979–1987	Succeeded by Adolf Ogi
