= Hans Hürlimann =

Swiss politician (1918–1994)

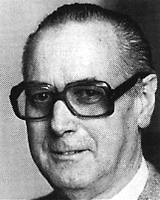
Hans Hurlimann

Hans Hürlimann (6 April 1918, Walchwil – 22 February 1994) was a Swiss politician and member of the Swiss Federal Council (1974–1982).

He was elected to the Federal Council of Switzerland on 5 December 1973 and handed over office on 31 December 1982. He was affiliated with the Christian Democratic People's Party of Switzerland.

During his office time he held the Federal Department of Home Affairs and was President of the Confederation in 1979.

Preceded by Roger Bonvin	Member of the Swiss Federal Council; 1974–1982	Succeeded by Alphons Egli
