= Willi Ritschard =

Swiss politician (1918–1983)

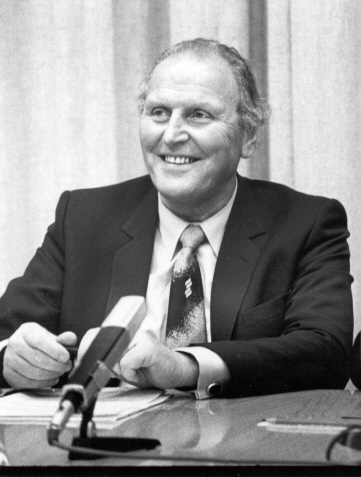
- Ritschard in 1983

Member of the National Council
- In office 5 December 1955 – 1 December 1963
- Constituency: Solothurn

Executive Councilor of Solothurn
- In office 1 January 1964 – 31 December 1973

Member of the Federal Council
- In office 1 January 1974 – 16 October 1983
- Preceded by: Hans-Peter Tschudi
- Succeeded by: Otto Stich

Personal details
- Born: 28 September 1918 Deitingen, Solothurn, Switzerland
- Died: 16 October 1983 (aged 65) Grenchenberg, Solothurn, Switzerland
- Party: Social Democratic
- Profession: Heating engineer
- Nickname: Willi National

Willi Ritschard (sometimes Willy Ritschard; 28 September 1918 – 16 October 1983) was a Swiss politician of the Social Democratic Party (SP). He is remembered as the first and to date only working class member of the Federal Council, the Swiss government. Prior to that, he was also a member of the cantonal government of Solothurn and a member of the National Council.

== Early life and education ==
Willi Ritschard was born on 28 September 1918 as the son of Ernst Emil Ritschard, a shoemaker in Deitingen and Social Democrat and Frieda (née Ryf), in Canton of Solothurn. As a child, he was beaten by his neighbors for being a son of left-wing workers. He lost both parents at the age of sixteen. He made an apprenticeship as a heating engineer but later got involved in the workers' union. He attended numerous classes at the Swiss Workers' Education Central which was established by the SP politician Max Weber.

== Career in the Workers Union ==
In 1945 he became the secretary of the Solothurn branch of the Construction and Woodworkers' Association (SBVH). On the Balmberg he established a Workers' Education School and in 1965, he became the president of the Association for the Furtherance of the Workers School, an office he held until he died. In the workers union, he argued that trade unions should not represent their demands for worker protection and social security on the streets, but instead together with the SP in the government.

== Political career ==
In 1947, Ritschard became the president (Gemeindeamman) of Luterbach, a position which he held until 1959. In 1955 he was elected to the National Council (the lower house of the Federal Assembly). In the National Council, he made himself known as a defender of workers' rights and demanded the limitation of foreign workers in 1962, which made him popular beyond party lines. In 1964 he was elected to the executive council (the cantonal government) of Solothurn. He supported the inter-cantonal commission for the harmonization of taxation. He also supported nuclear energy and was on the board of directors of Atel (now Alpiq). The construction of the nuclear power plant in Gösgen, Solothurn, began in 1972.

=== Federal Council ===
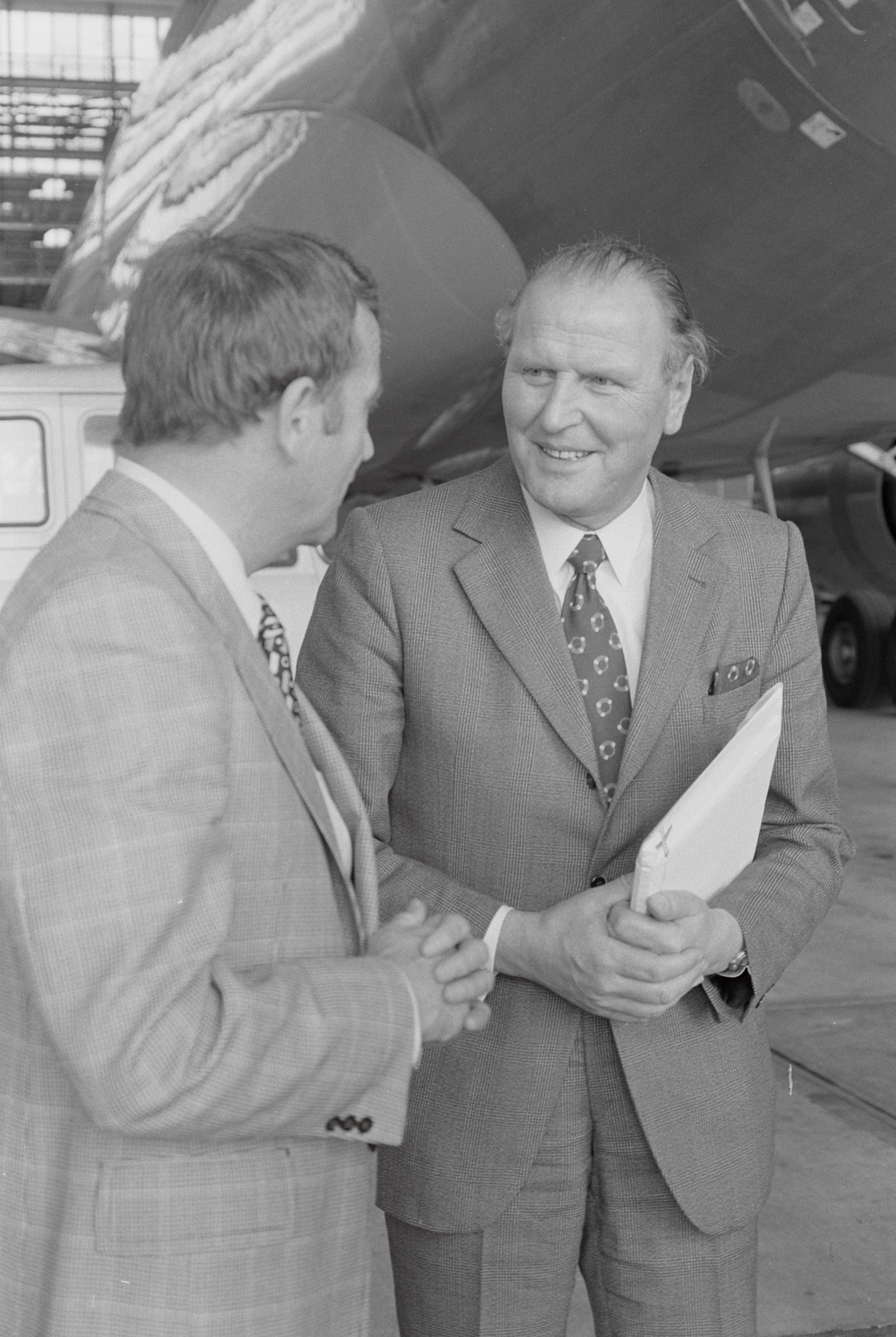
Willi Ritschard visiting Swissair in 1974

On 5 December 1973, Ritschard was elected to the Federal Council, where he assumed the leadership of the Department of Transport and Energy. He was elected despite not being the official candidate of his own party. He observed his election in front of a TV at home.

In 1974, he called the nuclear energy supporter Michael Kohn to the Energy Commission, which caused some controversy within the anti-nuclear movement. In 1975, as protestors occupied the construction site for the nuclear plant in Kaiseraugst, Ritschard was able to calm the situation offering the occupiers a halt for its construction for the time negotiations would take place. In 1978 he presided over the Federal Council as that year's President of the Swiss Confederation. The Nuclear Energy Act, which the Swiss citizens accepted in a national referendum in 1979, was enacted under his lead. He was not amused when he had to attend a royal banquet dressed in black tie on 1 May, International Workers' Day, on the occasion of Queen Elizabeth's state visit to Switzerland in 1980.

From 1980 onwards Ritschard was the head of the Federal Department of Finance. He announced his resignation on 28 September 1983 but died on 16 October 1983 before it could take effect.

== Legacy ==
Ritschard is remembered as the first Federal Councilor who belonged to the working class. He was a celebrity politician, and the punk band Hertz released a song about him while he was in office. His nickname was "Willi National". He was a well-known speaker, credited with being authentic. He acknowledged that he did not write all his speeches by himself; some were written by the writer and journalist Peter Bichsel, his neighbor. Two books with quotes of his were released during his tenure as a Federal Councilor, one in 1975 and another in 1982. Both were published by the Benteli publishing house.

== Personal life ==
Ritschard and Greti Hostettler married in 1941 and had two children, Margaretha Ueker-Ritschard and Rolf Ritschard, the latter becoming a member of the executive council of Solothurn.

Ritschard died on 16 October 1983, during a hike on the Grenchenberg near Grenchen. His funeral service took place in the St. Urs and Victor Cathedral in Solothurn on 20 October. He was buried in Luterbach, where in 2011 the Executive Council of Luterbach announced that Ritschard would be able to rest in Lautebach's graveyard without restriction, and extended this right to all of Luterbach's honorary citizens.

Preceded by Hans-Peter Tschudi	Member of the Swiss Federal Council; 1974–1983	Succeeded by Otto Stich
