= Georges-André Chevallaz =

Swiss historian and politician

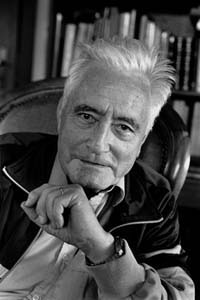
Chevallaz after retiring from the Federal Council

Georges-André Chevallaz (7 February 1915 – 8 September 2002) was a Swiss historian, politician and member of the Swiss Federal Council (1974–1983).

Mayor of Lausanne since 1957 and member of the Swiss National Council since 1958, he was elected to the Swiss Federal Council on 5 December 1973 and handed over office on 31 December 1983. He was affiliated to the Free Democratic Party. During his office time he held the following departments:

- Federal Department of Finance (1974–1979)
- Federal Military Department (1980–1983)

He was President of the Confederation in 1980.

After retiring from the Federal Council, he presided the foundation of the Historical Dictionary of Switzerland (1988–1992).

He was the father of Swiss politicians Martin Chevallaz and Olivier Chevallaz.

Preceded by Nello Celio	Member of the Swiss Federal Council; 1974–1983	Succeeded by Jean-Pascal Delamuraz
