= 1890 Swiss federal election =

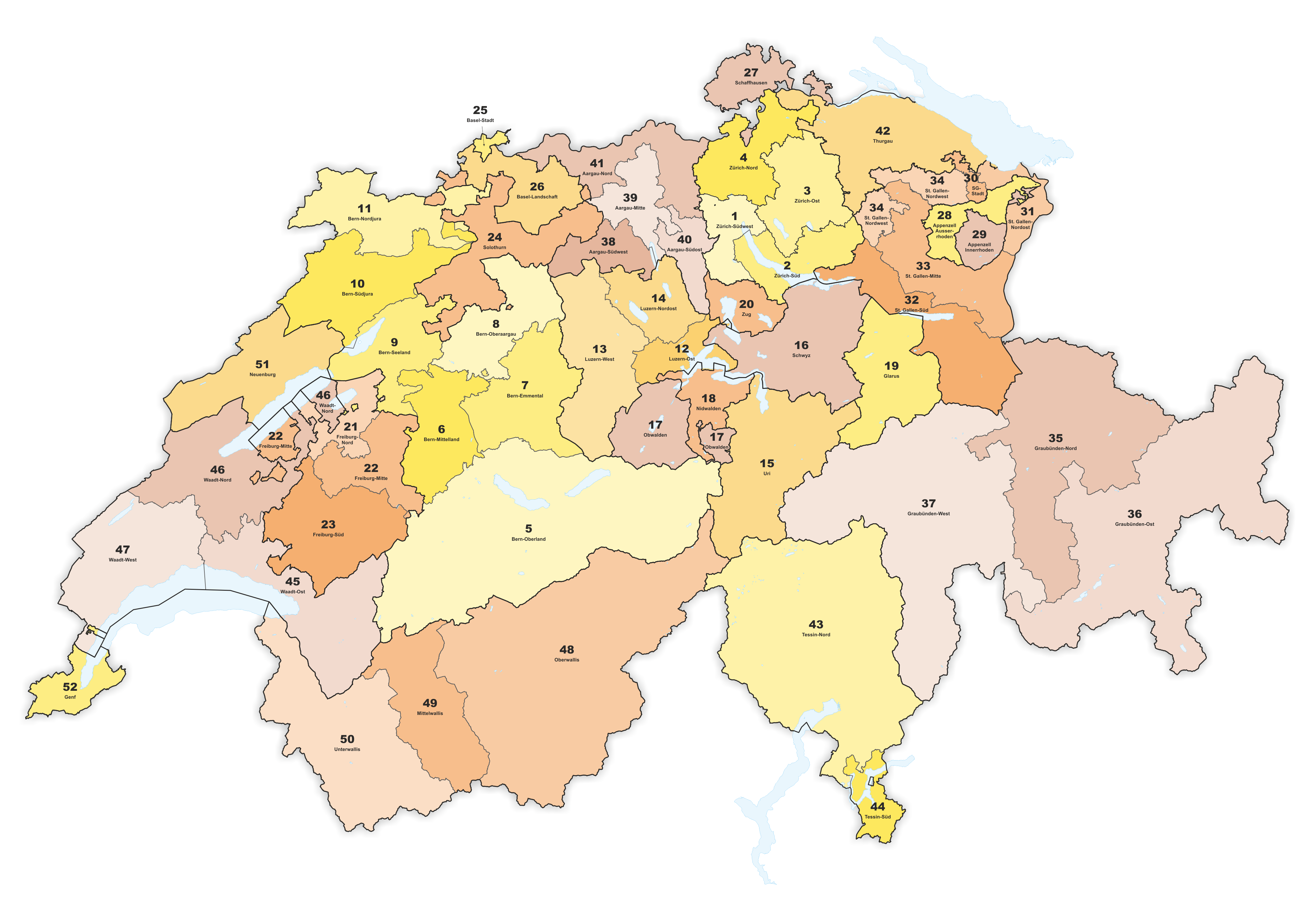
The 52 electoral districts

Federal elections were held in Switzerland on 26 October 1890. The Radical Left narrowly retained its majority in the National Council.

== Electoral system ==
The 147 members of the National Council were elected in 52 single- and multi-member constituencies using a three-round voting system of the Exhaustive ballot or a multiple-winner variant thereof. To be elected, in the first or second round a candidate or candidates had to receive a vote from a majority of the voters. If not all the seats were filled in the first or second round, it went to a third round. Again the least-popular candidate was eliminated but now only a plurality was required to determine the winner(s).

Voters could cast as many votes as there were seats in their constituency. There was one seat for every 20,000 citizens, with seats allocated to cantons based on that ratio.

The elections were held under the new Federal law concerning the elections of National Council members passed on 20 June 1890. Following the 1888 census (which had been brought forward from 1890 in order to redraw the constituencies prior to the elections) the number of seats was increased from 145 to 147, whilst the number of constituencies was increased from 49 to 52; Basel-Stadt, St. Gallen and Zürich all gained one seat, whilst Ticino lost a seat.

== Results ==
=== National Council ===
Voter turnout was highest in Schaffhausen (where voting was compulsory) at 94.3% and lowest in Schwyz at 35.6%.

Party	Votes	%	Seats	+/–
Radical Left		40.9	74	+1
Catholic Right		25.6	35	0
Liberal Centre		15.7	20	+1
Democratic Group		10.4	15	+1
Social Democratic Party		3.6	1	+1
Evangelical Right		2.4	2	–2
Independents		1.4	0	0
Total			147	+2
Total votes	415,098	–		
Registered voters/turnout	664,144	62.50		
Source: BFS (seats)

==== By constituency ====
Constituency	Seats	Party	Seats won	Elected members
Zürich 1	6	Liberal Centre	3	Konrad Cramer; Arnold Bürkli; Hans Konrad Pestalozzi
Zürich 1	6	Democratic Group	2	Johann Jakob Schäppi; Carl Theodor Curti
Zürich 1	6	Social Democratic Party	1	Jakob Vogelsanger
Zürich 2	4	Liberal Centre	3	Johann Heinrich Bühler; Johann Jakob Abegg; Johannes Eschmann
Zürich 2	4	Democratic Group	1	Johann Jakob Keller
Zürich 3	4	Democratic Group	4	Rudolf Geilinger; Ludwig Forrer; Johannes Stössel; Albert Locher
Zürich 4	3	Democratic Group	2	Friedrich Scheuchzer; Johannes Moser
Zürich 4	3	Liberal Centre	1	Heinrich Steinemann
Bern 5	5	Radical Left	5	Matthäus Zurbuchen; Arnold Gottlieb Bühler; Johann Zürcher; Johann Jakob Rebmann; Carl Samuel Zyro
Bern 6	5	Radical Left	5	Karl Stämpfli; Eduard Müller; Johann Jakob Hauser; Rudolf Brunner; Johann Jenny
Bern 7	4	Radical Left	4	Fritz Bühlmann; Adolf Müller; Gottfried Joost; Gottlieb Berger
Bern 8	4	Radical Left	2	Ernst August Grieb; Gottfried Bangerter
Bern 8	4	Bern People's Party	1	Ulrich Burkhalter
Bern 8	4	Liberal Centre	1	Jakob Adolf Roth
Bern 9	4	Radical Left	4	Eduard Bähler; Eduard Marti; Johannes Zimmermann; Rudolf Häni
Bern 10	3	Radical Left	3	Pierre Jolissaint; Joseph Stockmar; Albert Gobat
Bern 11	2	Catholic Right	1	Joseph Choquard
Bern 11	2	Radical Left	1	Henri Cuenat
Lucerne 12	2	Radical Left	2	Josef Vonmatt; Friedrich Wüest
Lucerne 13	3	Catholic Right	3	Candid Hochstrasser; Josef Zemp; Josef Erni
Lucerne 14	2	Catholic Right	2	Franz Xaver Beck; Josef Anton Schobinger
Uri 15	1	Catholic Right	1	Franz Schmid
Schwyz 16	3	Catholic Right	3	Vital Schwander Sr.; Nikolaus Benziger; Fridolin Holdener
Obwalden 17	1	Catholic Right	1	Peter Anton Ming
Nidwalden 18	1	Catholic Right	1	Hans von Matt Sr.
Glarus 19	2	Democratic Group	1	Kaspar Schindler
Glarus 19	2	Liberal Centre	1	Rudolf Gallati
Zug 20	1	Catholic Right	1	Franz Hediger
Fribourg 21	2	Radical Left	1	Friedrich Abraham Stock
Fribourg 21	2	Catholic Right	1	Georges Python
Fribourg 22	2	Catholic Right	2	Paul Aeby; Louis de Wuilleret
Fribourg 23	2	Catholic Right	2	Louis Grand; Alphonse Théraulaz
Solothurn 24	4	Radical Left	3	Joseph Gisi; Wilhelm Vigier; Albert Brosi
Solothurn 24	4	Liberal Centre	1	Bernard Hammer
Basel-Stadt 25	4	Radical Left	3	Ernst Brenner; Eduard Eckenstein; Hermann Kinkelin
Basel-Stadt 25	4	Liberal Centre	1	Paul Speiser
Basel-Landschaft 26	3	Radical Left	3	Emil Frey; Jakob Buser; Ambrosius Rosenmund
Schaffhausen 27	2	Democratic Group	1	Wilhelm Joos
Schaffhausen 27	2	Radical Left	1	Robert Grieshaber
Appenzell Ausserrhoden 28	3	Liberal Centre	2	Johannes Zuberbühler; Johann Jakob Sturzenegger
Appenzell Ausserrhoden 28	3	Radical Left	1	Johann Conrad Sonderegger
Appenzell Innerhoden 29	1	Catholic Right	1	J. B. E. Dähler
St. Gallen 30	2	Radical Left	1	Johannes Blumer
St. Gallen 30	2	Democratic Group	1	J. A. Scherrer-Füllemann
St. Gallen 31	2	Catholic Right	1	Johann Gebhard Lutz
St. Gallen 31	2	Evangelical Right	1	Christoph Tobler
St. Gallen 32	2	Catholic Right	2	Wilhelm Good; Johann Baptist Schubiger
St. Gallen 33	3	Radical Left	2	Johann Georg Berlinger; Carl Hilty
St. Gallen 33	3	Democratic Group	1	Eduard Steiger
St. Gallen 34	2	Catholic Right	2	Johann Joseph Keel; Othmar Staub
Grisons 35	2	Liberal Centre	1	Peter Theophil Bühler
Grisons 35	2	Democratic Group	1	Matthäus Risch
Grisons 36	2	Catholic Right	2	Caspar Decurtins; Johann Schmid
Grisons 37	1	Radical Left	1	Andrea Bezzola
Aargau 38	3	Radical Left	3	Arnold Künzli; Jakob Lüthy; Erwin Kurz
Aargau 39	3	Radical Left	3	Max Alphonse Erismann; Hans Riniker; Olivier Zschokke
Aargau 40	1	Catholic Right	1	Robert Weissenbach
Aargau 41	3	Liberal Centre	3	Emil Albert Baldinger; Emil Welti; Albert Ursprung
Thurgau 42	5	Radical Left	4	Karl Alfred Fehr; Friedrich Heinrich Häberlin; Gustav Merkle; Josef Anton Koch
Thurgau 42	5	Liberal Centre	1	Jakob Huldreich Bachmann
Ticino 43	2	Radical Left	2	Costantino Bernasconi; Leone de Stoppani
Ticino 44	4	Catholic Right	4	Filippo Bonzanigo; Giuseppe Volonterio; Ignazio Polar; Agostino Gatti
Vaud 45	5	Radical Left	5	Louis Ruchonnet; Charles-Eugène Fonjallaz; Eugène Ruffy; Louis Chausson; Louis Paschoud
Vaud 46	4	Radical Left	4	Jacques-François Viquerat; Louis Déglon; Jean Cavat; Ami Campiche
Vaud 47	3	Radical Left	3	Adrien Thélin; Charles Baud; Jules Colomb
Valais 48	2	Catholic Right	2	Hans Anton von Roten; Victor de Chastonay
Valais 49	1	Catholic Right	1	Joseph Kuntschen Sr.
Valais 50	2	Radical Left	1	Émile Gaillard
Valais 50	2	Catholic Right	1	Charles de Werra
Neuchâtel 51	5	Radical Left	5	Numa Droz; Robert Comtesse; Arnold Grosjean; Charles-Émile Tissot; Alfred Jeanhenry
Geneva 52	5	Liberal Centre	3	Eugène Richard; Gustave Ador; Jean-Étienne Dufour
Geneva 52	5	Radical Left	2	Adrien Lachenal; Georges Favon
Source: Gruner

=== Council of States ===
Party	Seats	+/–
Catholic Right	17	–1
Radical Left	17	0
Democratic Group	2	–1
Liberal Centre	2	–2
Evangelical Right	1	0
Social Democratic Party	1	New
Independents	1	+1
Vacant	3	+3
Total	44	0
Source: The Federal Assembly
