= 1893 Swiss federal election =

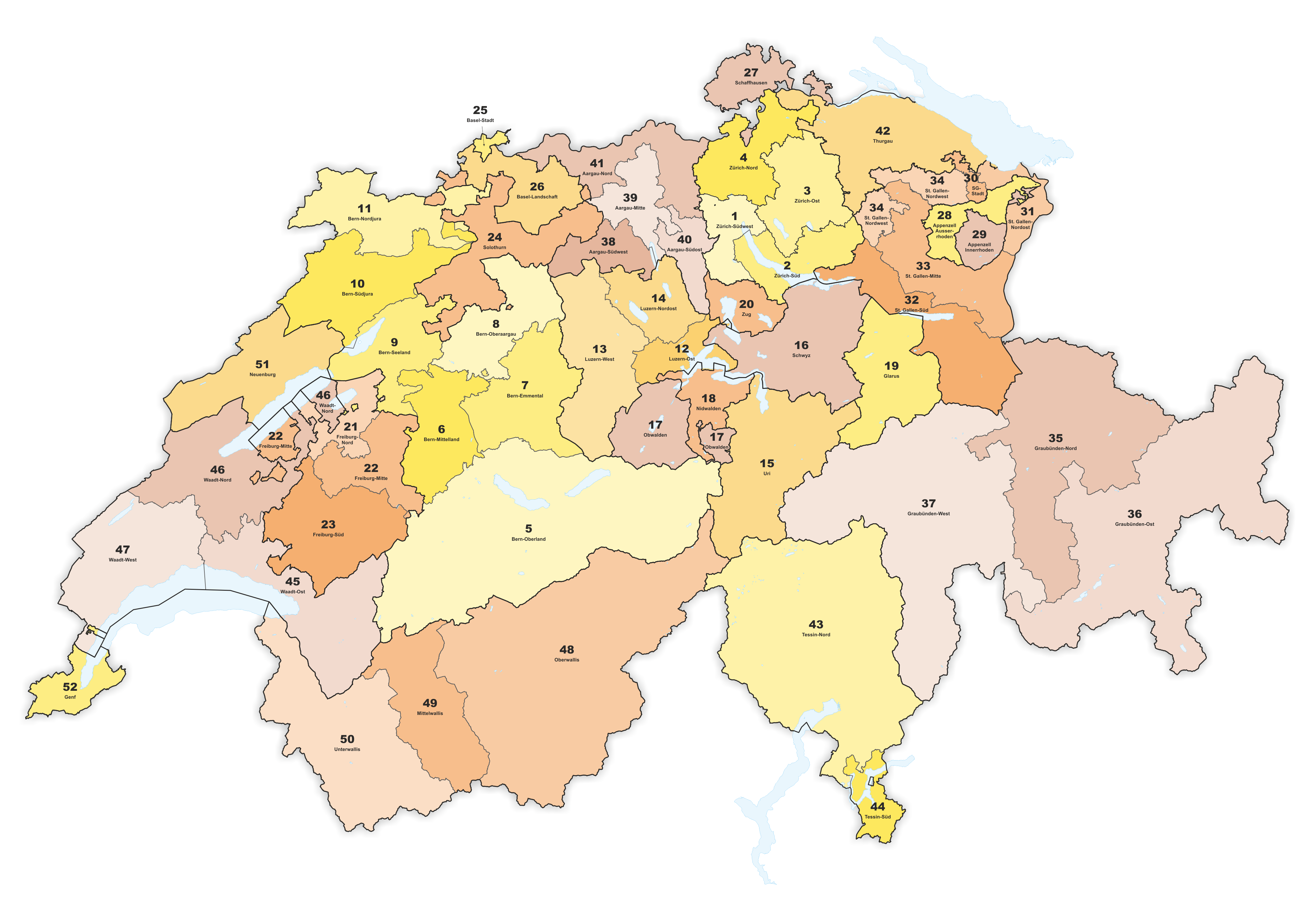
The 52 electoral districts

Federal elections were held in Switzerland on 29 October 1893. The Radical Left narrowly retained its majority in the National Council.

== Electoral system ==
The 147 members of the National Council were elected in 52 single- and multi-member constituencies using a three-round system. Candidates had to receive a majority in the first or second round to be elected; if it went to a third round, only a plurality was required. Voters could cast as many votes as there were seats in their constituency. There was one seat for every 20,000 citizens, with seats allocated to cantons in proportion to their population.

== Results ==
=== National Council ===
Voter turnout was highest in Schaffhausen (where voting was compulsory) at 91.5% and lowest in Zug at 17.5%.

Party	Votes	%	Seats	+/–
Radical Left		41.8	74	0
Catholic Right		20.0	29	–6
Liberal Centre		16.8	27	+7
Democratic Group		10.3	16	+1
Social Democratic Party		5.9	1	0
Evangelical Right		4.0	0	–2
Independents		1.2	0	0
Total			147	0
Total votes	391,610	–		
Registered voters/turnout	670,948	58.37		
Source: BFS (seats)

==== By constituency ====
Constituency	Seats	Party	Seats won	Elected members
Zürich 1	6	Liberal Centre	3	Hans Konrad Pestalozzi; Konrad Cramer; Ulrich Meister Jr.
Zürich 1	6	Democratic Group	2	Carl Theodor Curti; Johann Jakob Schäppi
Zürich 1	6	Social Democratic Party	1	Jakob Vogelsanger
Zürich 2	4	Liberal Centre	3	Johann Jakob Abegg; Johannes Eschmann; Hans Wunderli
Zürich 2	4	Democratic Group	1	Heinrich Hess
Zürich 3	4	Democratic Group	4	Rudolf Geilinger; Ludwig Forrer; Albert Locher; Albert Kündig
Zürich 4	3	Democratic Group	2	Johannes Moser; Friedrich Scheuchzer
Zürich 4	3	Liberal Centre	1	Heinrich Steinemann
Bern 5	5	Radical Left	5	Matthäus Zurbuchen; Arnold Gottlieb Bühler; Johann Jakob Rebmann; Franz Neuhaus; Gottfried Feller
Bern 6	5	Radical Left	3	Rudolf Brunner; Johann Jenny; Eduard Müller
Bern 6	5	Evangelical Right	2	Edmund von Steiger; Ernst Wyss
Bern 7	4	Radical Left	4	Fritz Bühlmann; Adolf Müller; Gottfried Joost; Gottlieb Berger
Bern 8	4	Radical Left	3	Hans Dinkelmann; Emil Moser; Gottfried Bangerter
Bern 8	4	Bern People's Party	1	Ulrich Burkhalter
Bern 9	4	Radical Left	4	Eduard Bähler; Johannes Zimmermann; Eduard Marti; Rudolf Häni
Bern 10	3	Radical Left	3	Pierre Jolissaint; Albert Gobat; Joseph Stockmar
Bern 11	2	Catholic Right	1	Joseph Choquard
Bern 11	2	Radical Left	1	Henri Cuenat
Lucerne 12	2	Radical Left	2	Hermann Heller; Josef Vonmatt
Lucerne 13	3	Catholic Right	3	Josef Erni; Candid Hochstrasser; Theodor Schmid
Lucerne 14	2	Catholic Right	2	Josef Anton Schobinger; Franz Xaver Beck
Uri 15	1	Catholic Right	1	Franz Schmid
Schwyz 16	3	Catholic Right	3	Vital Schwander Sr.; Fridolin Holdener; Nikolaus Benziger
Obwalden 17	1	Catholic Right	1	Peter Anton Ming
Nidwalden 18	1	Catholic Right	1	Hans von Matt Sr.
Glarus 19	2	Democratic Group	1	Kaspar Schindler
Glarus 19	2	Liberal Centre	1	Rudolf Gallati
Zug 20	1	Catholic Right	1	Franz Hediger
Fribourg 21	2	Liberal Centre	1	Louis de Diesbach
Fribourg 21	2	Radical Left	1	Constant Dinichert
Fribourg 22	2	Catholic Right	2	Paul Aeby; Louis de Wuilleret
Fribourg 23	2	Catholic Right	2	Louis Grand; Alphonse Théraulaz
Solothurn 24	4	Radical Left	3	Joseph Gisi; Albert Brosi; Wilhelm Vigier
Solothurn 24	4	Liberal Centre	1	Bernard Hammer
Basel-Stadt 25	4	Liberal Centre	2	Paul Speiser; Emil Bischoff
Basel-Stadt 25	4	Radical Left	2	Ernst Brenner; Hermann Kinkelin
Basel-Landschaft 26	3	Radical Left	3	Johannes Suter; Emil Frey; Jakob Buser
Schaffhausen 27	2	Radical Left	2	Wilhelm Joos; Robert Grieshaber
Appenzell Ausserrhoden 28	3	Liberal Centre	3	Johannes Zuberbühler; Johann Jakob Sturzenegger; Johann Konrad Eisenhut
Appenzell Innerhoden 29	1	Liberal Centre	1	Karl Justin Sonderegger
St. Gallen 30	2	Radical Left	1	Karl Emil Wild
St. Gallen 30	2	Democratic Group	1	J. A. Scherrer-Füllemann
St. Gallen 31	2	Catholic Right	1	Johann Gebhard Lutz
St. Gallen 31	2	Evangelical Right	1	Christoph Tobler
St. Gallen 32	2	Catholic Right	2	Wilhelm Good; Johann Baptist Schubiger
St. Gallen 33	3	Radical Left	2	Johann Georg Berlinger; Carl Hilty
St. Gallen 33	3	Democratic Group	1	Eduard Steiger
St. Gallen 34	2	Catholic Right	2	Johann Joseph Keel; Othmar Staub
Grisons 35	2	Liberal Centre	1	Peter Theophil Bühler
Grisons 35	2	Democratic Group	1	Matthäus Risch
Grisons 36	2	Catholic Right	1	Caspar Decurtins
Grisons 36	2	Radical Left	1	Johann Anton Casparis Jr.
Grisons 37	1	Liberal Centre	1	Thomas von Albertini
Aargau 38	3	Radical Left	3	Arnold Künzli; Jakob Lüthy; Erwin Kurz
Aargau 39	3	Radical Left	3	Max Alphonse Erismann; Olivier Zschokke; Emil Frey
Aargau 40	1	Catholic Right	1	Jakob Nietlispach
Aargau 41	3	Liberal Centre	2	Albert Ursprung; Emil Albert Baldinger
Aargau 41	3	Catholic Right	1	Franz Xaver Widmer
Thurgau 42	5	Radical Left	3	Karl Alfred Fehr; Friedrich Heinrich Häberlin; Gustav Merkle
Thurgau 42	5	Liberal Centre	1	Jakob Huldreich Bachmann
Thurgau 42	5	Democratic Group	1	Josef Anton Koch
Ticino 43	2	Radical Left	2	Achille Borella; Leone de Stoppani
Ticino 44	4	Radical Left	4	Plinio Bolla; Alfredo Pioda; Germano Bruni; Demetrio Camuzzi
Vaud 45	5	Radical Left	5	Charles-Eugène Fonjallaz; Louis Chausson; Charles Boiceau; Eugène Ruffy; Paul Cérésole
Vaud 46	4	Radical Left	4	Jacques-François Viquerat; Louis Déglon; Émile Paillard; Jean Cavat
Vaud 47	3	Radical Left	2	Adrien Thélin; Ernest Decollogny
Vaud 47	3	Liberal Centre	1	Louis-Charles Delarageaz
Valais 48	2	Catholic Right	2	Hans Anton von Roten; Alfred Perig
Valais 49	1	Catholic Right	1	Joseph Kuntschen Sr.
Valais 50	2	Radical Left	1	Émile Gaillard
Valais 50	2	Catholic Right	1	Charles de Werra
Neuchâtel 51	5	Radical Left	5	Robert Comtesse; Donat Fer; Louis-Alexandre Martin; Charles-Émile Tissot; Alfred Jeanhenry
Geneva 52	5	Liberal Centre	3	Gustave Ador; Alexandre Ramu; Jacques Rutty
Geneva 52	5	Radical Left	2	Adrien Lachenal; Louis Charrière
Source: Gruner

=== Council of States ===
Party	Seats	+/–
Radical Left	20	+3
Catholic Right	15	–2
Liberal Centre	3	+1
Democratic Group	2	0
Evangelical Right	1	0
Social Democratic Party	1	0
Independents	0	–1
Vacant	2	–1
Total	44	0
Source: Federal Assembly
