= 1899 in Switzerland =

- Decades: 1870s; 1880s; 1890s; 1900s; 1910s
- See also: History of Switzerland; Timeline of Swiss history; List of years in Switzerland

Events from the year 1899 in Switzerland.

== Incumbents ==
- Federal Council:
  - Eduard Müller (president)
  - Joseph Zemp
  - Adolf Deucher
  - Walter Hauser
  - Ernst Brenner
  - Eugene Ruffy (until October)
  - Adrien Lachenal (until December)
  - Robert Comtesse (from December)
  - Marc-Emile Ruchet (from December)

== Events ==
- 14 January – 1899 European Figure Skating Championships takes place in Davos.
- 26 October – 1899 Swiss federal election.
- 14 December – Walther Hauser is elected president by the Swiss Federal Assembly.
- Alliance F established.
- Gurten Funicular established.
- Monthey-Champéry-Morgins established.
- 1899 World Figure Skating Championships takes place in Switzerland.

== Births ==
- 12 January – Paul Hermann Müller, chemist (died 1965)
- 26 February – Max Petitpierre, politician (died 1994)
- 10 April – Friedrich Traugott Wahlen, politician (died 1985)
- 22 June – Charles Hug, painter, draftsman and book illustrator (died 1979)

== Deaths ==
- 24 February – Emil Welti, politician (born 1825)
- 27 November – Constant Fornerod, politician (born 1819)
- 15 December – Numa Droz, politician (born 1844)
