= 1878 Swiss federal election =

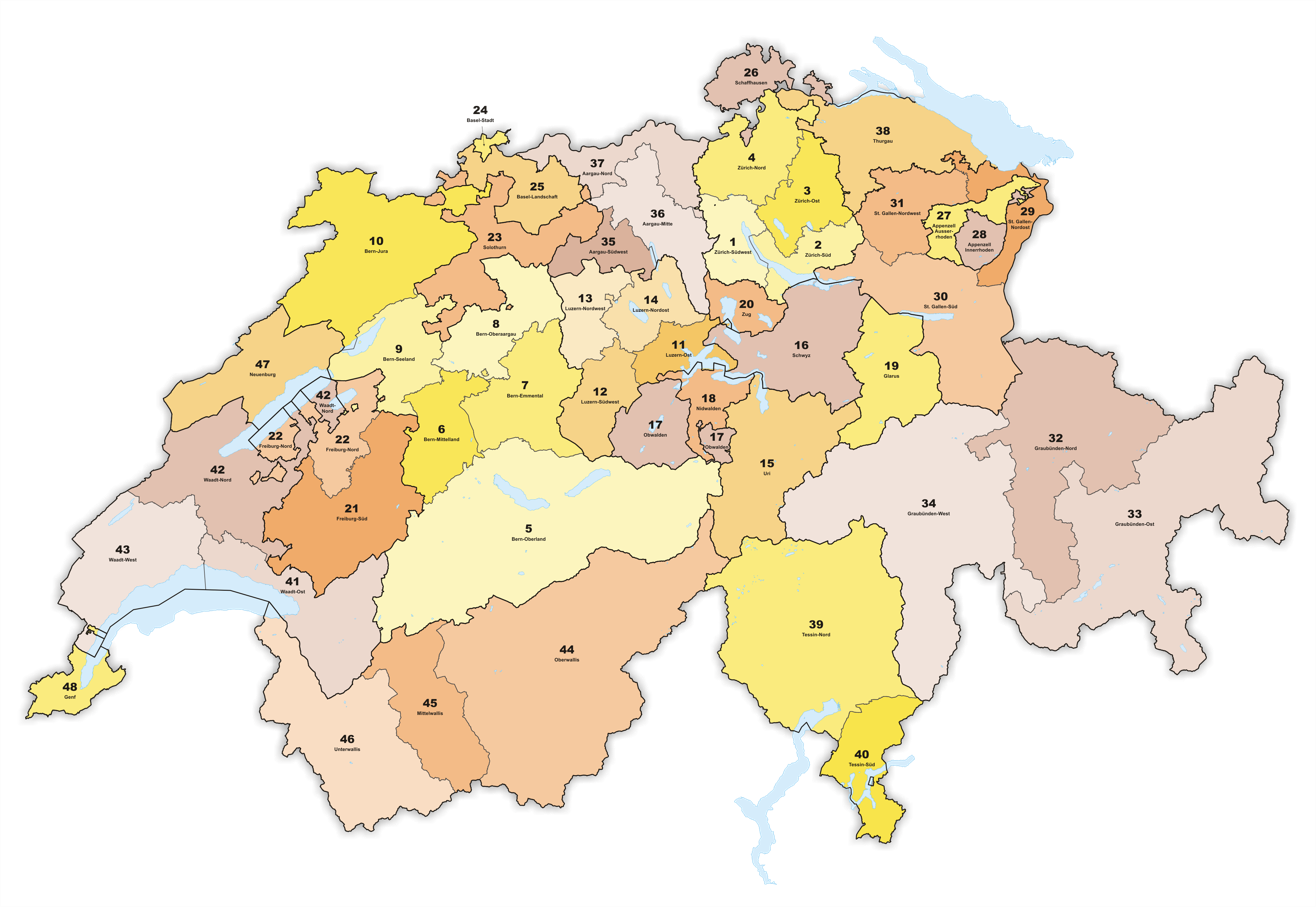
The 48 electoral districts

Federal elections were held in Switzerland on 27 October 1878. The Radical Left remained the largest group in the National Council.

== Electoral system ==
The 135 members of the National Council were elected in 48 single- and multi-member constituencies using a three-round system. Candidates had to receive a majority in the first or second round to be elected; if it went to a third round, only a plurality was required. Voters could cast as many votes as there were seats in their constituency. There was one seat for every 20,000 citizens, with seats allocated to cantons in proportion to their population.

== Results ==
=== National Council ===
Voter turnout was highest in Schaffhausen (where voting was compulsory) at 95.1% and lowest in Schwyz at 26.7%.

Party	Votes	%	Seats	+/–
Radical Left		34.8	57	–6
Catholic Right		26.3	37	+4
Liberal Centre		23.2	26	+6
Democratic Group		9.4	10	–5
Evangelical Right		5.1	5	+3
Socialists		0.2	0	0
Independents		1.0	0	0
Total			135	0
Total votes	360,542	–		
Registered voters/turnout	634,080	56.86		
Source: BFS (seats)

==== By constituency ====
Constituency	Seats	Party	Seats won	Elected members
Zürich 1	5	Liberal Centre	5	Melchior Römer; Johann Jakob Widmer; Alfred Escher; Johannes Ryf; Johann Kaspar Baumann
Zürich 2	3	Liberal Centre	2	Johann Jakob Hasler; Heinrich Landis
Zürich 2	3	Democratic Group	1	Johann Jakob Keller
Zürich 3	3	Democratic Group	3	Friedrich Salomon Vögelin; Johannes Stössel; Salomon Bleuler
Zürich 4	3	Democratic Group	3	Johannes Moser; Friedrich Scheuchzer; Johann Jakob Scherer
Bern 5	5	Radical Left	5	Jakob Scherz; Carl Samuel Zyro; Friedrich Seiler; Johannes Ritschard; Wilhelm Teuscher
Bern 6	4	Radical Left	3	Rudolf Rohr; Rudolf Brunner; Friedrich von Werdt
Bern 6	4	Evangelical Right	1	Otto von Büren
Bern 7	4	Radical Left	4	Karl Schenk; Gottfried Joost; Gottlieb Riem; Karl Karrer
Bern 8	4	Radical Left	4	Johann Bützberger; Alexander Bucher; Rudolf Leuenberger; Albert Friedrich Born
Bern 9	3	Radical Left	3	Johannes Schlup; Jakob Stämpfli; Charles Kuhn
Bern 10	5	Radical Left	3	Hippolyte Paulet; Niklaus Kaiser; Auguste-Adolphe Klaye
Bern 10	5	Evangelical Right	2	Abraham Boivin; Albert Morel
Lucerne 11	2	Liberal Centre	1	Josef Martin Knüsel
Lucerne 11	2	Radical Left	1	Josef Vonmatt
Lucerne 12	1	Catholic Right	1	Alois Räber
Lucerne 13	2	Catholic Right	2	Josef Erni; Vinzenz Fischer
Lucerne 14	2	Catholic Right	2	Philipp Anton von Segesser; Franz Xaver Beck
Uri 15	1	Catholic Right	1	Josef Arnold
Schwyz 16	2	Catholic Right	2	Ambros Eberle; Fridolin Holdener
Obwalden 17	1	Catholic Right	1	Nicolaus Hermann
Nidwalden 18	1	Catholic Right	1	Robert Durrer
Glarus 19	2	Radical Left	1	Niklaus Tschudi
Glarus 19	2	Liberal Centre	1	Esajas Zweifel
Zug 20	1	Catholic Right	1	Niklaus Moos
Fribourg 21	3	Catholic Right	3	Louis de Weck; Laurent Chaney; Arthur Techtermann
Fribourg 22	3	Catholic Right	3	Joseph Jaquet; Louis Grand; Louis de Wuilleret
Solothurn 23	4	Radical Left	3	Simon Kaiser; Leo Weber; Hermann Dietler
Solothurn 23	4	Liberal Centre	1	Bernhard Hammer
Basel-Stadt 24	2	Radical Left	1	Karl Burckhardt-Iselin
Basel-Stadt 24	2	Liberal Centre	1	Johann Rudolf Geigy-Merian
Basel-Landschaft 25	3	Radical Left	3	Jakob Bernhard Graf; Gédéon Thommen; Emil Frey
Schaffhausen 26	2	Democratic Group	1	Wilhelm Joos
Schaffhausen 26	2	Radical Left	1	Robert Grieshaber
Appenzell Ausserrhoden 27	2	Radical Left	1	Johann Fässler
Appenzell Ausserrhoden 27	2	Liberal Centre	1	Daniel Hofstetter
Appenzell Innerhoden 28	1	Catholic Right	1	Alois Broger
St. Gallen 29	4	Liberal Centre	2	Arnold Otto Aepli; Thomas Thoma
St. Gallen 29	4	Catholic Right	1	Johann Gebhard Lutz
St. Gallen 29	4	Evangelical Right	1	Carl von Gonzenbach
St. Gallen 30	3	Liberal Centre	1	Rudolf Hilty
St. Gallen 30	3	Catholic Right	1	Wilhelm Good
St. Gallen 30	3	Radical Left	1	Johann Baptist Gaudy
St. Gallen 31	3	Catholic Right	2	Johann Fridolin Müller; Johann Joseph Keel
St. Gallen 31	3	Liberal Centre	1	Johann Rudolf Moser
Grisons 32	2	Evangelical Right	1	Hermann J. von Sprecher
Grisons 32	2	Radical Left	1	Johann Gaudenz von Salis
Grisons 33	2	Radical Left	1	Anton Steinhauser
Grisons 33	2	Catholic Right	1	Johann R. von Toggenburg
Grisons 34	1	Liberal Centre	1	Andreas Rudolf von Planta
Aargau 35	3	Liberal Centre	2	Carl Feer-Herzog; Johann Haberstich
Aargau 35	3	Radical Left	1	Arnold Künzli
Aargau 36	4	Radical Left	3	Peter Suter; Robert Straub; Hans Riniker
Aargau 36	4	Liberal Centre	1	Johann Rohr
Aargau 37	3	Catholic Right	2	Karl von Schmid; Emil Albert Baldinger
Aargau 37	3	Liberal Centre	1	Emil Welti
Thurgau 38	5	Democratic Group	3	Severin Stoffel; Jakob Albert Scherb; Fridolin Anderwert
Thurgau 38	5	Radical Left	1	Friedrich Heinrich Häberlin
Thurgau 38	5	Liberal Centre	1	Johann Messmer
Ticino 39	3	Catholic Right	3	Massimiliano Magatti; Bernardino Lurati; Erennio Spinelli
Ticino 40	3	Catholic Right	3	Michele Pedrazzini; Carlo Vonmentlen; Agostino Gatti
Vaud 41	4	Liberal Centre	2	Charles Boiceau; Aymon de Gingins
Vaud 41	4	Radical Left	2	Louis Ruchonnet; Antoine Vessaz
Vaud 42	4	Radical Left	4	Paul Wulliémoz; Georges-Louis Contesse; Paul André; Frédéric Criblet
Vaud 43	3	Radical Left	3	Louis-Henri Delarageaz; Charles Baud; Théodore du Plessis
Valais 44	2	Catholic Right	2	Hans Anton von Roten; Victor de Chastonay
Valais 45	1	Catholic Right	1	Ferdinand de Montheys
Valais 46	2	Catholic Right	2	Charles de Werra; Fidèle Joris
Neuchâtel 47	5	Radical Left	5	Jules Philippin; Louis-Alexandre Martin; Arnold Grosjean; Charles-Alfred Petitpierre; Louis Constant Lambelet
Geneva 48	4	Liberal Centre	4	Arthur Chenevière; Gustave-Jules Pictet; François-Isaac Mayor; Carl Vogt
Source: Gruner

=== Council of States ===
Party	Seats	+/–
Catholic Right	17	+1
Radical Left	11	0
Liberal Centre	11	+2
Democratic Left	2	–2
Evangelical Right	0	0
Independents	2	–1
Vacant	1	0
Total	44	0
Source: The Federal Assembly
