= August Suter =

August Suter may refer to:

- August Suter (politician)
- August Suter (sculptor)
