= Federal Department of Environment, Transport, Energy and Communications =

Swiss federal department

- (in German) Eidgenössisches Departement für Umwelt, Verkehr, Energie und Kommunikation (in French) Département fédéral de l'environnement, des transports, de l'énergie et des communications (in Italian) Dipartimento federale dell'ambiente, dei trasporti, dell'energia e delle comunicazioni (in Romansh) Departament federal per ambient, traffic, energia e communicaziun

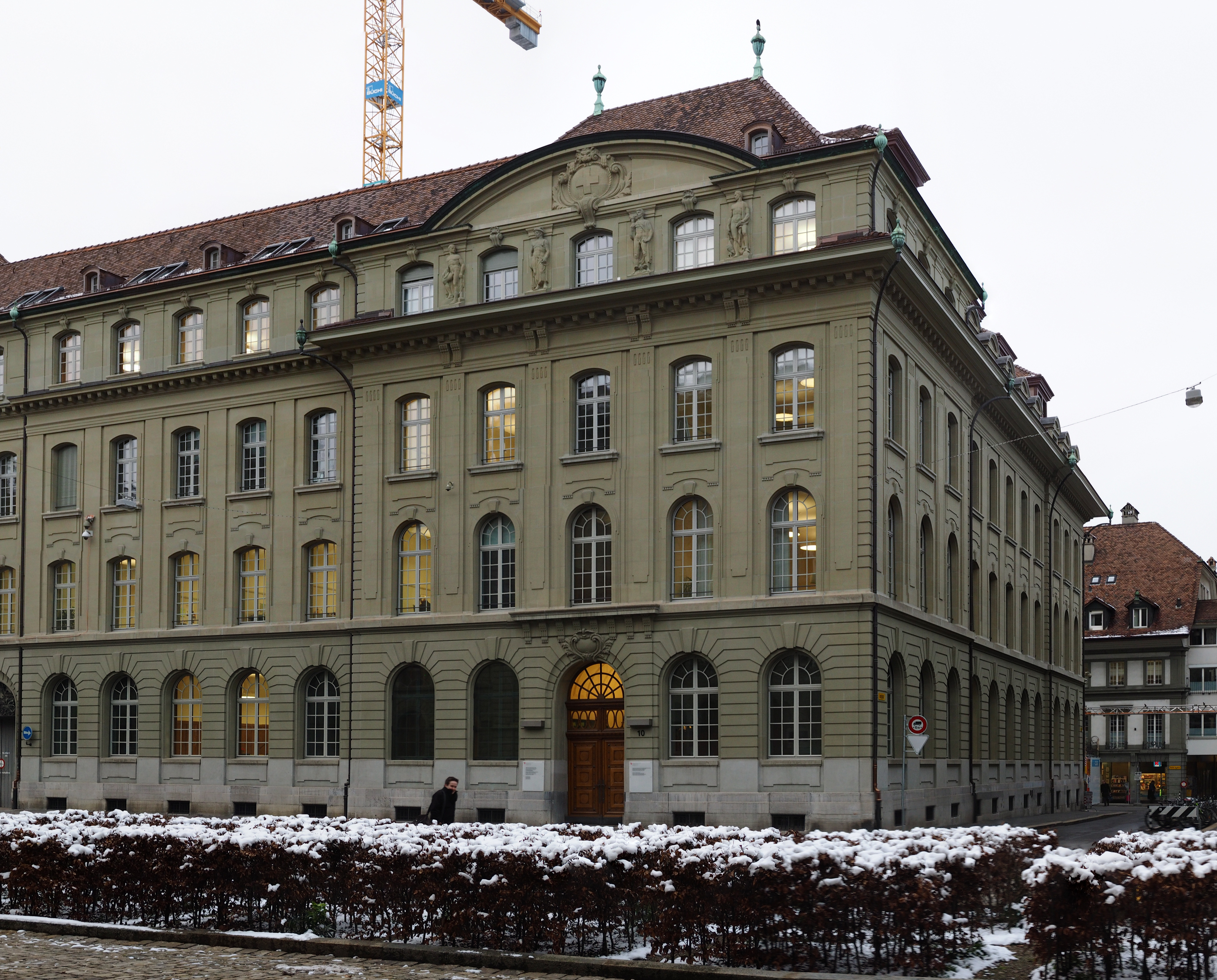
- The Federal Palace North

Agency overview
- Formed: 1848; 178 years ago
- Jurisdiction: Federal administration of Switzerland
- Headquarters: Bern
- Employees: 2,500
- Annual budget: Expenditure: CHF 9 billion Revenue: CHF 815.3 million (2009)
- Minister responsible: Albert Rösti, Federal Councillor
- Website: uvek.admin.ch

The Federal Department of Environment, Transport, Energy and Communications (DETEC, German: Eidgenössisches Departement für Umwelt, Verkehr, Energie und Kommunikation, French: Département fédéral de l'environnement, des transports, de l'énergie et des communications, Italian: Dipartimento federale dell'ambiente, dei trasporti, dell'energia e delle comunicazioni, Romansh: Departament federal per ambient, traffic, energia e communicaziun) is one of the seven departments of the Swiss federal government, headed by a member of the Swiss Federal Council.

== Organisation ==
The department is composed of the following offices:

- General Secretariat
- Federal Office for Spatial Development (ARE): Coordinates area planning between the federal agencies, the cantons and the municipalities.
- Federal Office for the Environment (FOEN): Responsible for matters of the environment, including the protection of plants and animals and the protection against noise, air pollution or natural hazards.
- Federal Office for Civil Aviation (FOCA): Regulates civil aviation.
- Federal Office of Communications (OFCOM): Regulates radio and TV stations, notably the Swiss Broadcasting Corporation.
- Federal Office of Energy (FOE): Responsible for the provision of electrical energy at the federal level, as well as for the supervision of dams.
- Federal Office of Transport (FOT): Responsible for public transport at the federal level, including the development of the federal rail network and navigation on the Rhine.
- Federal Roads Office (FEDRO): Responsible for the construction, maintenance and operation of the national highway network.

The following independent authorities are affiliated to the DETEC for administrative purposes:

- Swiss Transportation Safety Investigation Board (STSB, formerly Aircraft Accident Investigation Bureau and Investigation Bureau for Railway, Funicular and Boat Accidents).
- Federal Communications Commission (ComCom): Regulates the telecommunications market, awards service licences, rules on interconnection disputes and approves frequency and numbering plans.
- Federal Electricity Commission (ElCom): monitors electricity prices, rules as a judicial authority on disputes relating to network access and payment of cost-covering feed-in of electricity produced from renewable energy, monitors electricity supply security and regulates issues relating to international electricity transmission and trading.
- Federal Postal Services Commission (PostCom): Regulates the Swiss Post and Swiss postal market.
- Rail Transport Commission (RailCom): Arbitrates in disputes over access to the rail network and the calculation of fees for the use of infrastructure.
- Independent Complaints Authority for Radio and Television (ICA): Decides on complaints related to radio and television programmes.
- Safety Office (formerly known as the Civil Aviation Safety Office, CASO): supports the development of safety in land, sea and air transport, in the use, transport and distribution of energy, and for communications infrastructures
- Reporting Office for Just Culture in Civil Aviation (ROJCA): strengthens Just Culture through the protection of the information source of an occurrence reporting in Swiss Civil Aviation.
- Federal Inspectorate for Heavy Current Installations (ESTI): Responsible for inspecting low and heavy-current electrical installations.
- Swiss Federal Nuclear Safety Inspectorate (ENSI): Assesses and monitors security and radiation protection in Swiss nuclear installations.
- Federal Pipelines Inspectorate (ERI): Responsible for the planning, construction and operation of fuel pipeline systems in Switzerland and Liechtenstein.
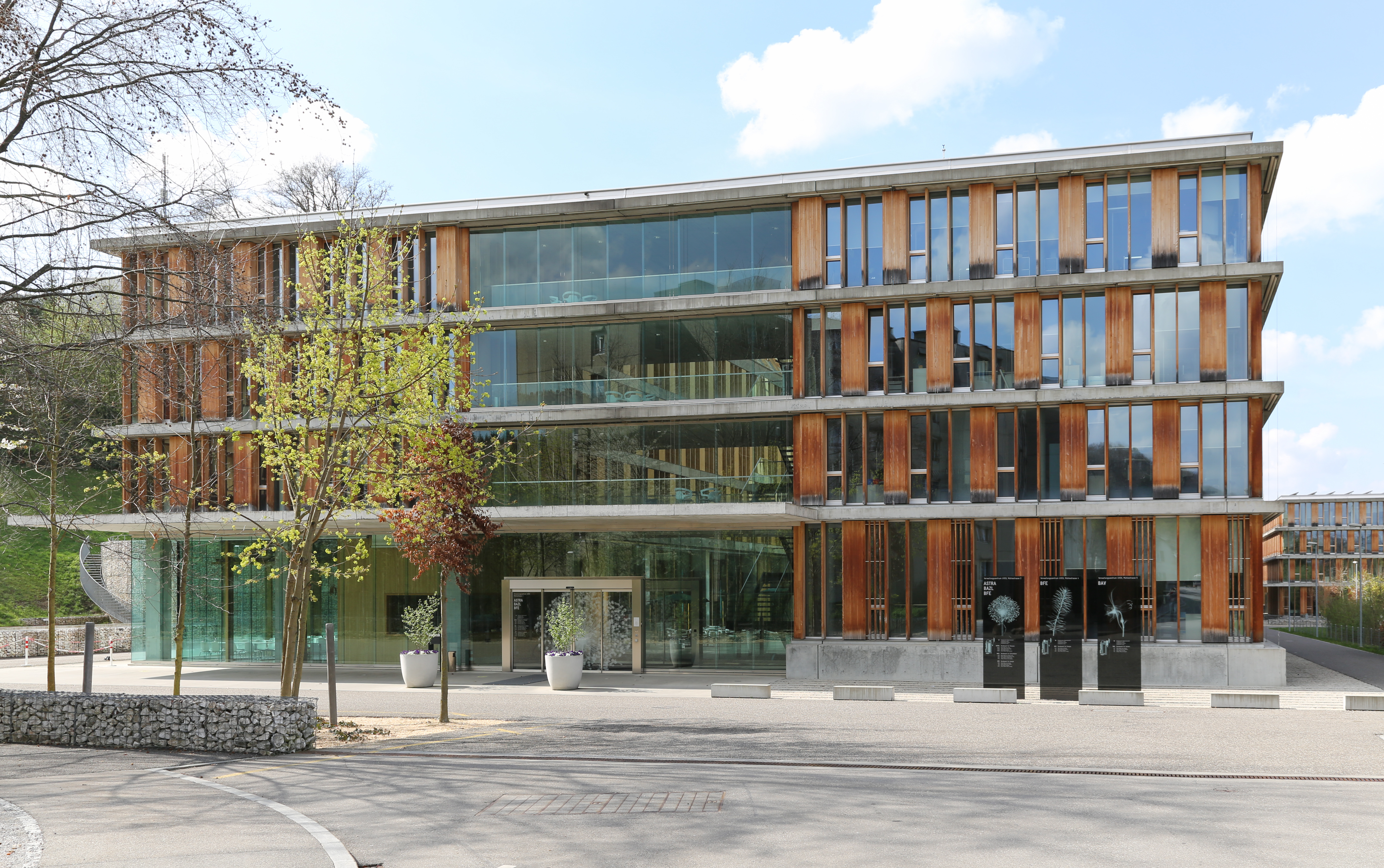
The building of the Federal Office of Civil Aviation, the Federal Roads Office and the Federal Office of Energy

== Name of department ==
- 1848–1859: Department of Posts and Construction
- 1860–1872: Department of Posts
- 1873–1878: Department of Posts and Telegraph
- 1879–1962: Department of Posts and Railways
- 1963–1978: Department of Transport, Communications and Energy
- 1979–1997: Federal Department of Transport, Communications and Energy
- Since 1998: Federal Department of Environment, Transport, Energy and Communications

== List of heads of the department ==
- 1848–1852: Wilhelm Matthias Naeff
- 1853–1854: Josef Munzinger
- 1855–1866: Wilhelm Matthias Naeff
- 1867 only: Jakob Dubs
- 1868 only: Jean-Jacques Challet-Venel
- 1869 only: Jakob Dubs
- 1870–1872: Jean-Jacques Challet-Venel
- 1873–1875: Eugène Borel
- 1876 only: Joachim Heer
- 1877–1879: Emil Welti
- 1880–1881: Simeon Bavier
- 1882–1883: Emil Welti
- 1884 only: Adolf Deucher
- 1885–1891: Emil Welti
- 1892–1901: Josef Zemp
- 1902 only: Robert Comtesse
- 1903–1907: Josef Zemp
- 1908–1911: Ludwig Forrer
- 1912 only: Robert Comtesse
- 1912 only: Louis Perrier
- 1911–1917: Ludwig Forrer
- 1918–1929: Robert Haab
- 1930–1940: Marcel Pilet-Golaz
- 1940–1950: Enrico Celio
- 1950–1954: Josef Escher
- 1955–1959: Giuseppe Lepori
- 1960–1965: Willy Spühler
- 1966–1968: Rudolf Gnägi
- 1968–1973: Roger Bonvin
- 1974–1979: Willy Ritschard
- 1980–1987: Leon Schlumpf
- 1988–1995: Adolf Ogi
- 1995–2010: Moritz Leuenberger
- 2010–2018: Doris Leuthard
- 2019–2022: Simonetta Sommaruga
- Since 2023: Albert Rösti

== Full-time positions since 2001 ==
Raw data

"Federal Finance Administration FFA: State financial statements".
"Federal Finance Administration FFA: Data portal".

== See also ==
- Energy in Switzerland
