= Federal Department of Foreign Affairs =

Swiss government department

- Eidgenössisches Departement für auswärtige Angelegenheiten (German); Département fédéral des affaires étrangères (French); Dipartimento federale degli affari esteri (Italian); Departament federal d’affars exteriurs (Romansh)

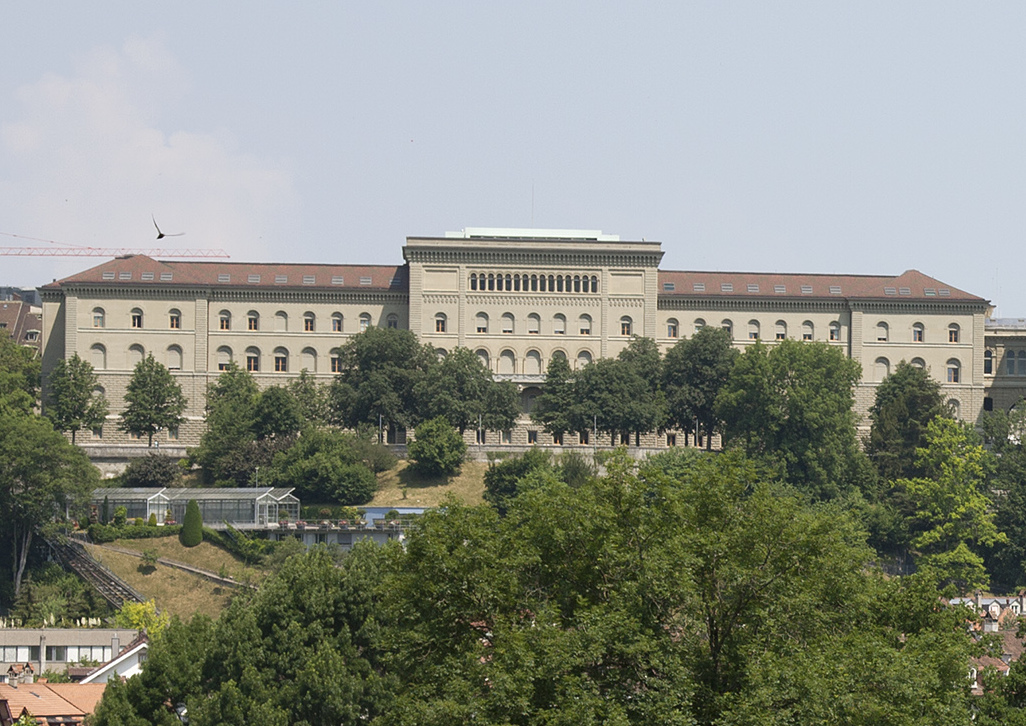
- The west wing of the Federal Palace of Switzerland

Agency overview
- Formed: 1848; 178 years ago
- Jurisdiction: Federal administration of Switzerland
- Headquarters: Bern, Switzerland
- Employees: 5,345
- Minister responsible: Ignazio Cassis, Federal Councillor
- Website: www.eda.admin.ch

The Federal Department of Foreign Affairs (FDFA; German: Eidgenössisches Departement für auswärtige Angelegenheiten; French: Département fédéral des affaires étrangères; Italian: Dipartimento federale degli affari esteri; Romansh: Departament federal d’affars exteriurs), so named since 1979, is one of the seven Departments of the Swiss government federal administration of Switzerland, and corresponds in its range of tasks to the ministry of foreign affairs in other countries. The department is always headed by one of the members of the Swiss Federal Council. Since 1 November 2017, the department is headed by Federal Councillor Ignazio Cassis.

== Official names ==
- 1848–1887: Federal Political Department
- 1888–1895: Federal Department of the Exterior
- 1896–1978: Federal Political Department
- since 1979: Federal Department of Foreign Affairs

== Mission ==
The mission of the FDFA is to safeguard Switzerland's interests abroad and its relations with other countries, as stipulated in Art. 54, para. 1 of the Swiss Federal Constitution. The subsequent paragraph further outlines the parameters by which Swiss foreign policy is to be conducted:

The Confederation shall ensure that the independence of Switzerland and its welfare is safeguarded; it shall in particular assist in the alleviation of need and poverty in the world and promote respect for human rights and democracy, the peaceful co-existence of peoples as well as the conservation of natural resources.

At the beginning of every parliamentary legislature, the FDFA submits a foreign policy strategy to the Federal Council, setting out the main focus areas and foreign policy priorities for the term. For the 2020-23 period, these focus areas include:

- Peace and security
- Prosperity
- Sustainability
- Digitalisation

== History ==
The FDFA has been one of the key Swiss ministries since the creation of the modern Swiss federal state in 1848.

Originally, what was then known as the "Federal Political Department" (FPD) was led by whomever held the rotating presidency, meaning the responsibility for foreign affairs changed on a yearly basis. With very limited means at its disposal, it comprised a meagre staff of officers in Bern and a very limited diplomatic and consular network abroad.

In 1887, the department was restructured by then-president Numa Droz, who then assumed leadership of what was thereafter known as the Federal Department of the Exterior for five years. Beginning in 1896, the Federal Council reprised the previous rotating system, which would be maintained until 1914 with the passage of the Federal Administration Act. From that moment forward, the head of the FPD would no longer change from year to year, and the department, in liaison with the Department of the Economy (present-day known as the Federal Department of Economic Affairs, Education and Research) accrued increased competence in commercial matters. With Switzerland's accession to the League of Nations in the aftermath of the First World War, the FPD's responsibilities were further expanded and in particular as Geneva was transformed into a major hub for international diplomacy, marked in particular by the construction of the Palais des Nations in to serve as headquarters for the League in that city.

Following the Second World War, in which Switzerland remained neutral, the orientation of Swiss foreign policy adjusted to the new paradigms of the Cold War. Switzerland did not join the newly created United Nations, which succeeded the League of Nations. The reason for this refusal was that it was impossible to obtain explicit recognition from the organisation of its status as a neutral country. In 1961, specific structures were created within the FDP for the administration of official development assistance and for fostering relations with other countries in Europe and, in particular, the various European cooperation organisations that emerged in that period, such as the European Coal and Steel Community.

With the expanding portfolio of responsibilities assigned to the ministry, in 1979 the FDP was once again reorganised and renamed, this time to the present name, Federal Department of Foreign Affairs. At the same time, the position of FDFA state secretary — the number-two person at the Department – was created, and competences of the department were increased to cover areas such as disarmament, science policy and human rights.

In 2002, Switzerland joined the United Nations, following the endorsement of its accession through a popular referendum. In 2023, it assumed a seat as a non-permanent member of the United Nations Security Council.

== Organization ==
- General Secretariat
  - Presence Switzerland
- State Secretariat
  - Presidential Affairs and Protocol
  - Crisis Management Centre
- Directorate of Political Affairs
  - Europe, Central Asia, Council of Europe, OSCE Division
  - Middle East and North Africa Division
  - Subsaharan Africa and Francophonie Division
  - Asia and the Pacific Division
  - Americas Division
  - United Nations and International Organisations
  - Human Security Division
  - Sectoral Foreign Policy Division
  - Division for Security Policy
- Directorate of European Affairs, DEA
- Directorate of Corporate Resources (DR)
- Consular Directorate CD
- Directorate of International Law DIL
- Swiss Agency for Development and Cooperation (SDC)

== List of heads of department ==
- 1848–1849: Jonas Furrer
- 1850: Henri Druey
- 1851: Josef Munzinger
- 1852: Jonas Furrer
- 1853: Wilhelm Matthias Naeff
- 1854: Friedrich Frey-Herosé
- 1855: Jonas Furrer
- 1856: Jakob Stämpfli
- 1857: Constant Fornerod
- 1858: Jonas Furrer
- 1859: Jakob Stämpfli
- 1860: Friedrich Frey-Herosé
- 1861: Melchior Josef Martin Knüsel
- 1862: Jakob Stämpfli
- 1863: Constant Fornerod
- 1864: Jakob Dubs
- 1865: Karl Schenk
- 1866: Melchior Josef Martin Knüsel
- 1867: Constant Fornerod
- 1868: Jakob Dubs
- 1869: Emil Welti
- 1870: Jakob Dubs
- 1871: Karl Schenk
- 1872: Emil Welti
- 1873: Paul Cérésole
- 1874: Karl Schenk
- 1875: Johann Jakob Scherer
- 1876: Emil Welti
- 1877: Joachim Heer
- 1878: Karl Schenk
- 1879: Bernhard Hammer
- 1880: Emil Welti
- 1881: Numa Droz
- 1882: Simeon Bavier
- 1883: Louis Ruchonnet
- 1884: Emil Welti
- 1885: Karl Schenk
- 1886: Adolf Deucher
- 1887–1892: Numa Droz
- 1893–1896: Adrien Lachenal
- 1897: Adolf Deucher
- 1898: Eugène Ruffy
- 1899: Eduard Müller
- 1900: Walter Hauser
- 1901: Ernst Brenner
- 1902: Josef Zemp
- 1903: Adolf Deucher
- 1904: Robert Comtesse
- 1905: Marc-Émile Ruchet
- 1906: Ludwig Forrer
- 1907: Eduard Müller
- 1908: Ernst Brenner
- 1909: Adolf Deucher
- 1910: Robert Comtesse
- 1911: Marc-Émile Ruchet
- 1912: Ludwig Forrer
- 1913: Eduard Müller
- 1914–1917: Arthur Hoffmann
- 1917: Gustave Ador
- 1918–1919: Felix Calonder
- 1920–1940: Giuseppe Motta
- 1940–1944: Marcel Pilet-Golaz
- 1945–1961: Max Petitpierre
- 1961–1965: Friedrich Traugott Wahlen
- 1966–1970: Willy Spühler
- 1970–1978: Pierre Graber
- 1978–1987: Pierre Aubert
- 1988–1993: René Felber
- 1994–1999: Flavio Cotti
- 1999–2002: Joseph Deiss
- 2003–2011: Micheline Calmy-Rey
- 2012–2017: Didier Burkhalter
- 2017–present: Ignazio Cassis

== See also ==
- Foreign relations of Switzerland
- Protecting power
- List of diplomatic missions of Switzerland

== Full-time positions since 2001 ==
Raw data

"Federal Finance Administration FFA: State financial statements".
"Federal Finance Administration FFA: Data portal".
