= Federal Roads Office (Switzerland) =

Swiss federal agency

Coordinates: 46°58′25″N 7°28′48″E

- (in German) Bundesamt für Strassen (in French) Office fédéral des routes (in Italian) Ufficio federale delle strade

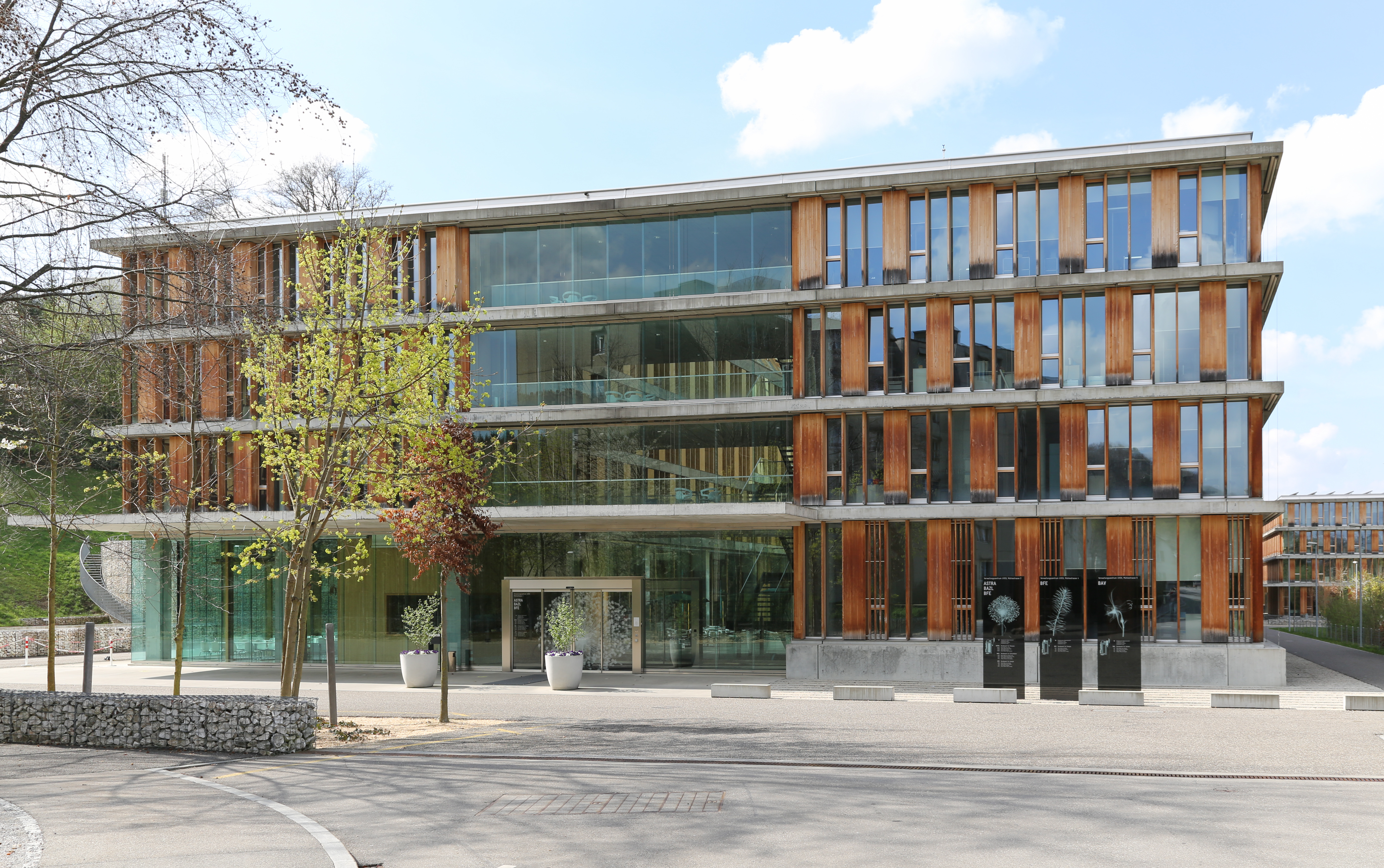

Agency overview
- Formed: 1998
- Jurisdiction: Federal administration of Switzerland
- Headquarters: Ittigen
- Employees: 600
- Minister responsible: Albert Rösti, Federal Councillor
- Parent agency: Federal Department of Environment, Transport, Energy and Communications
- Website: www.astra.admin.ch

The Federal Roads Office (FEDRO) (Note: German: Bundesamt für Strassen, ASTRA; French: Office fédéral des routes, OFROU; Italian: Ufficio federale delle strade, USTRA) is a Swiss federal office responsible for road infrastructure and private road transport.

== Background ==
Created in 1998, the office is attached to the Federal Department of the Environment, Transport, Energy and Communications (DETEC), and is based in Ittigen.

== Full-time positions since 2001 ==
Raw data

"Federal Finance Administration FFA: State financial statements".
"Federal Finance Administration FFA: Data portal".
