= Arthur Hoffmann (politician) =

Swiss politician (1857-1927)

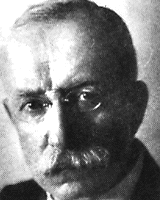

President of Switzerland
- In office 1 January 1914 – 31 December 1914
- Preceded by: Eduard Müller
- Succeeded by: Giuseppe Motta

Swiss Federal Councillor
- In office 4 April 1911 – 19 June 1917
- Preceded by: Ernst Brenner
- Succeeded by: Gustave Ador

Personal details
- Born: 19 June 1857 St. Gallen, Canton of St. Gallen, Switzerland
- Died: 23 July 1927 (aged 70) St. Gallen, Canton of St. Gallen, Switzerland
- Party: Free Democratic Party
- Parent: Karl Hoffmann (father)

Arthur Hoffmann (19 June 1857 – 23 July 1927) was a Swiss politician who was a member of the Swiss Federal Council from 1911 to 1917.

Born in St. Gallen, Hoffmann was the son of Karl Hoffmann (1820–1895), who declined his election to the Swiss Federal Council in 1881.

Arthur Hoffmann was elected to the Federal Council on 4 April 1911 and resigned on 19 June 1917 as a result of the Grimm–Hoffmann Affair which seriously questioned Switzerland's neutrality during World War I.

He was affiliated with the Free Democratic Party. He died on 23 July 1927 in St. Gallen.

During Hoffmann's office time he held the following departments:

- Department of Justice and Police (1911)
- Military Department (1912–1913)
- Political Department (1914–1917)

Hoffmann was President of the Confederation in 1914.

Political offices
Preceded by Casimir von Arx	President of the Swiss Council of States; 1902/1903	Succeeded by Adrien Lachenal
Preceded by Ernst Brenner	Member of the Swiss Federal Council; 1911–1917	Succeeded by Gustave Ador
