= Arnold Otto Aepli =

Swiss jurist and statesman

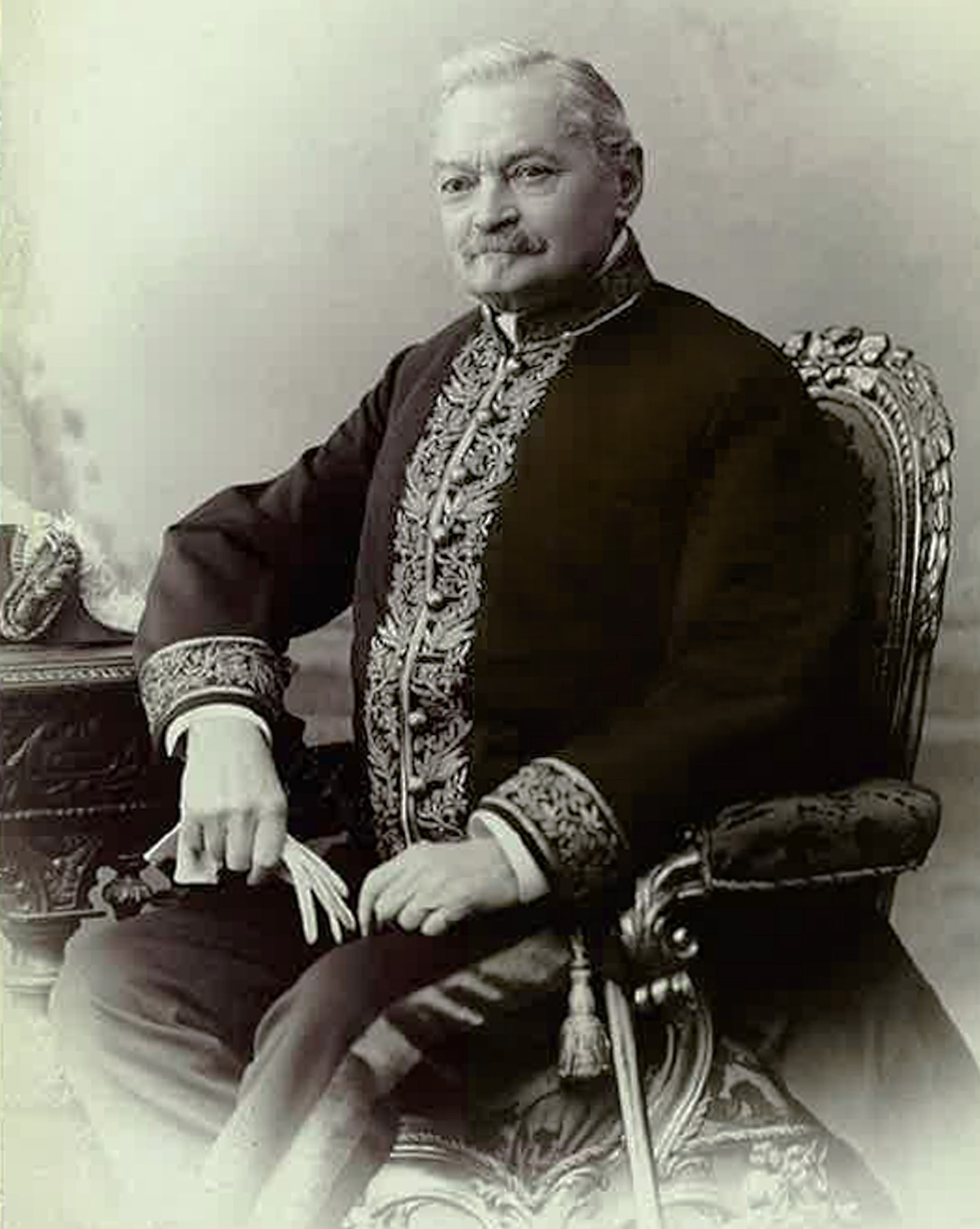
Aepli c. 1890

Arnold Otto Aepli (22 August 1816 in St. Gallen – 4 December 1897) was a Swiss jurist and statesman. Aepli was president of the Swiss Council of States (1868/1869) and National Council (1876/1877). He belonged to the Liberal Centre, which later developed into the Liberal Party of Switzerland.

== Life ==
Aepli was born on 22 August 1816 in St. Gallen to Alexander Aepli, a physician and public-health official, and Anna (née Tanner). He attended Gymnasium in St. Gallen and the Academy in Lausanne before studying jurisprudence at the universities in Heidelberg, Berlin and Zürich. During this time Aepli joined the Schweizer Zofingerverein Studentenverbindung.

After finishing his studies, Aepli returned to his hometown and started a career as a jurist, quickly rising through the ranks and becoming a judge of the cantonal court in 1849, of which he served as president between 1873 and 1883.

In addition to his professional activities, Aepli was an active member of the liberal movement (which would later become the FDP). As such, Aepli was a member of the St. Gallen city parliament from 1849 to 1851. He was also member of the St. Gallen cantonal parliament from 1847 to 1883 and the St. Gallen cantonal government from 1851 to 1873, the latter he presided over seven times during his tenure and headed the departments of Justice, Foreign Affairs and Defence, and Construction. In 1849, Aepli was elected to the Council of States where he served from 1849 to 1853 and again from 1857 to 1872 and which he presided over in 1868/69. In the Council of States, among other things, Aepli successfully campaigned for the cancelation of war-debts of the Sonderbund cantons. From 1872 to 1883, Aepli was a member of the National Council which he presided over in 1876/77. During this time, in 1875, Aepli was a candidate for the Federal Council, he however failed to win the liberal nomination.

The Swiss Confederation also made use of Aepli’s remarkable ability to strike a balance between differing positions, entrusting him with various mandates. Such as naming him Federal Commissioner in Geneva during the Savoy Trade between 1858 and 1869 and again as Federal Commissioner between 1862 and 1870 during a border dispute between the cantons of Appenzell Innerhoden and Appenzell Ausserhoden.

After ending his political career, Aepli was named Swiss Ambassador in Vienna, with accreditation in Serbia and Romania, in 1883, a role he had previously served in ad interim in 1866.

Preceded by Johann Jakob Blumer	President of the Council of States; 1868/1869	Succeeded by Eugène Borel
Preceded by Emil Frey	President of the National Council; 1876/1877	Succeeded by Eduard Marti
