= Marc-Émile Ruchet =

Swiss politician (1853–1912)

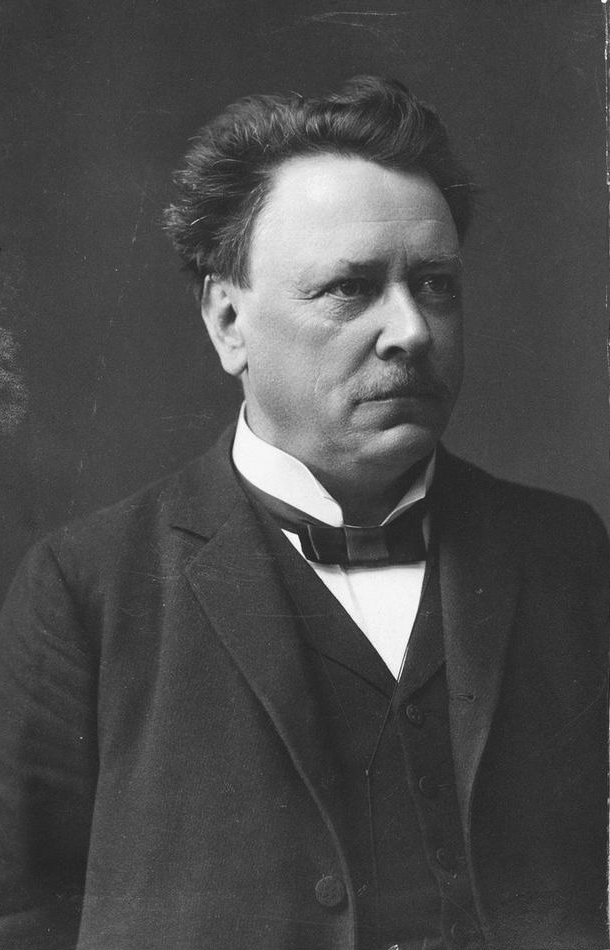

President of Switzerland
- In office 1 January 1911 – 31 December 1911
- Preceded by: Robert Comtesse
- Succeeded by: Ludwig Forrer
- In office 1 January 1905 – 31 December 1905
- Preceded by: Robert Comtesse
- Succeeded by: Ludwig Forrer

Swiss Federal Councillor
- In office 14 December 1899 – 9 July 1912
- Preceded by: Eugène Ruffy
- Succeeded by: Camille Decoppet

Personal details
- Born: 14 September 1853 Saint-Saphorin-sur-Morges, Vaud, Switzerland
- Died: 13 July 1912 (aged 58) Bern, Canton of Bern, Switzerland
- Party: Free Democratic Party
- Education: University of Lausanne

Marc-Émile Ruchet (14 September 1853 – 13 July 1912) was a French-speaking Swiss politician.

He was elected to the Swiss Federal Council on 14 December 1899 and resigned on 9 July 1912, only four days before his death. He was affiliated with the Free Democratic Party.

While in office he held the following departments:

- Department of Home Affairs (1900 –1903)
- Department of Finance (1904)
- Political Department (1905)
- Department of Home Affairs (1906–1910)
- Political Department (1911)
- Department of Home Affairs (1912)

He was President of the Confederation twice, in 1905 and 1911.

== Biography ==
Ruchet was born as the son of Charles, a teacher, and Lina Elise (née Bäurlin). He studied law in Lausanne and Heidelberg and earned a licence at the University of Lausanne in 1875.

In the office of Louis Ruchonnet, Ruchet gained first experience in the legal area and was admitted to the bar in 1878. From 1886 until 1888 he sat on the board of directors of the Western Switzerland Railways, and from 1890 until 1899 on the board of the Jura–Simplon Railways.

Elected to the Federal Council in 1899, he minted the federal law on the forestry services (1902). After the death of his wife his bad health deteriorated further. Only a few days after stepping down in 1912, Ruchet died.

Political offices
Preceded by Eugène Ruffy	Member of the Swiss Federal Council; 1899–1912	Succeeded by Camille Decoppet
