= Jules Philippin =

Swiss politician (1818–1882)

Jules Philippin (18 June 1818 in Le Locle – 15 December 1882) was a Swiss politician and President of the Swiss National Council (1866/1867 and 1878).

Preceded by Niklaus Niggeler	President of the National Council; 1866/67	Succeeded by Johann Jakob Stehlin
Preceded by Eduard Marti	President of the National Council; 1878	Succeeded by Melchior Römer
