= Melchior Römer =

Swiss politician

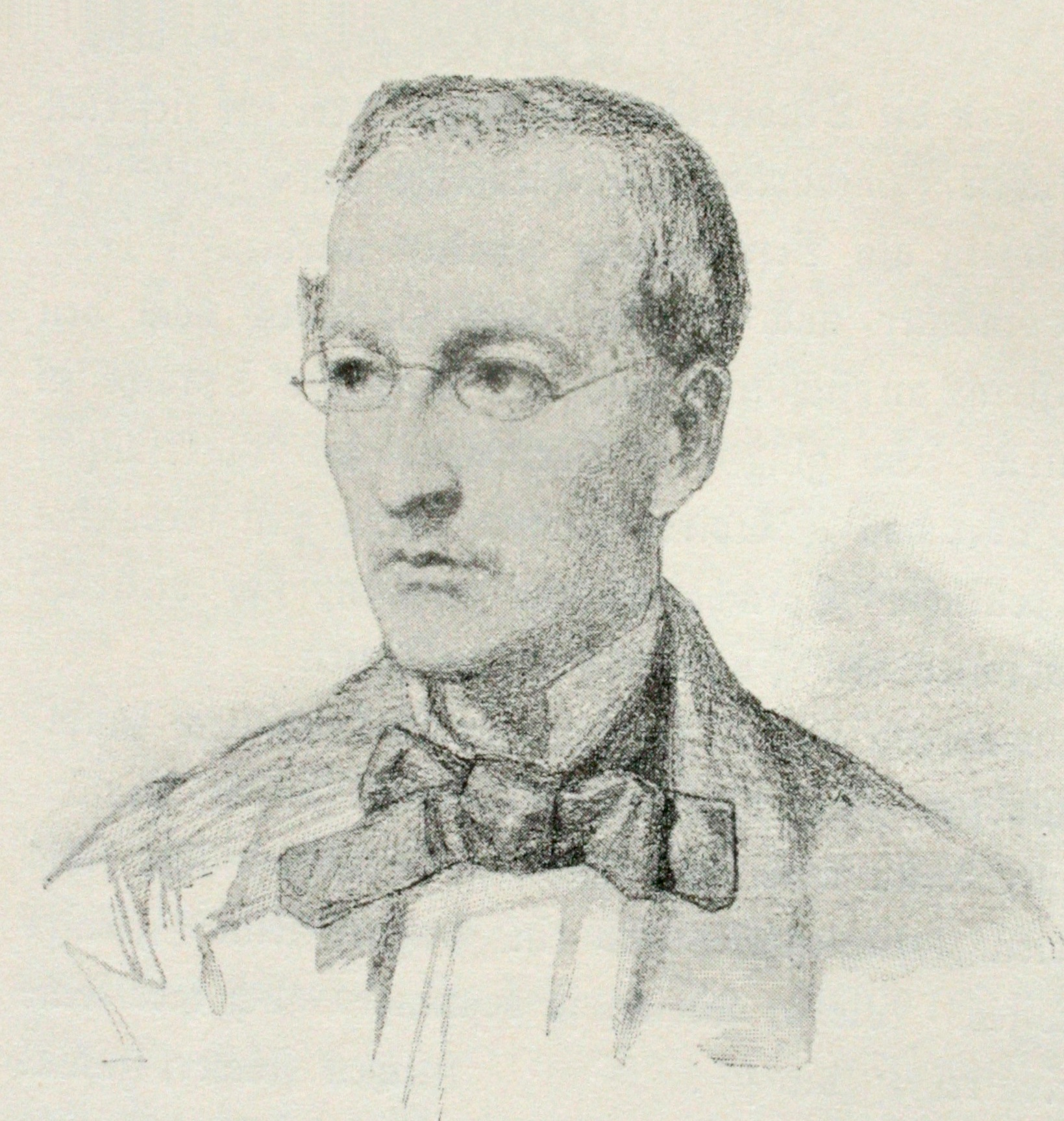
Römer (1853) by Albert Anker

Melchior Römer (16 June 1831 in Zürich – 2 April 1895) was a Swiss politician, mayor of Zürich (1867–1889) and President of the Swiss National Council (1878/79).

Preceded by Jules Philippin	President of the National Council; 1878/1879	Succeeded by Arnold Künzli
