= Monthey-Champéry-Morgins =

Former railway company in Switzerland

Advertising poster for the Monthey-Champéry-Morgins line (Anton Recknagel, 1907)

The Monthey-Champéry-Morgins railway (MCM) was a railway company in the Chablais region of Switzerland which was formed to construct a metre gauge line linking Monthey with Champéry and a branch line from the village of d’Illiez to Morgins.

== History ==
The federal authorities agreed the concession to construct the line on 22 June 1899 but work only proceeded slowly. It was the intention that the line made an end-on the junction with the Chemin de fer Aigle-Ollon-Monthey railway and that they open on the same date offering a service, with a change of train, between Aigle and Champery. When the AOM opened on 3 April 1907 the MCM was incomplete and did not open until 30 January the following year. Due to the economic climate the branch line linking d'Illiez and Morgins was never built although the village remained in its title until amalgamation.

The company amalgamated with the Chemin de fer Aigle-Ollon-Monthey (MCM) from 1 January 1946 and became part of the Transports Publics du Chablais in 2001.
