= August Suter (politician) =

Swiss politician

Gallus August Suter (20 June 1829 in Nesslau – 13 September 1901) was a Swiss politician and President of the Swiss National Council (1890).

Preceded by Heinrich Häberlin	President of the National Council; 1890	Succeeded by Eduard Müller
