= Kaspar Schindler (veterinarian) =

Swiss veterinarian and politician

- Lithograph from the Schweizerische Portrait-Gallerie, 1892
- Born: 11 March 1832; Mollis, Glarus, Switzerland
- Died: 27 December 1898 (aged 66); Mollis, Glarus, Switzerland
- Occupations: Veterinarian, politician
- Spouse: Elsbeth Leuzinger (m. 1861)
- Father: Jakob Schindler

Kaspar Schindler (11 March 1832 – 27 December 1898) was a Swiss veterinarian and politician from Mollis in the canton of Glarus. He was a member of the National Council for the Democratic and Workers' Party from 1884 to 1898, a member of the cantonal government from 1887 to 1890 and deputy Landammann from 1890 to 1898, and he represented the interests of the workers.

== Biography ==
Kaspar Schindler was born on 11 March 1832 in Mollis, now part of the municipality of Glarus Nord, the son of Jakob Schindler, a butcher. In 1861 he married Elsbeth Leuzinger, daughter of the master printer Johann Jakob Leuzinger.

Schindler studied veterinary medicine in Zurich and Munich, and from 1857 he was a veterinarian in Mollis.

In 1863 Schindler became a member of the municipal council (Gemeinderat) of Mollis, and from 1890 to 1898 he was president of the municipality (Gemeindepräsident). From 1863 to 1867 he was a member of the cantonal parliament (Landrat) of Glarus. He was a judge of the marriage court (Eherichter) from 1872 to 1875 and of the court of appeal (Appellationsrichter) from 1875 to 1878, a member of the state commission (Standeskommission) from 1878 to 1887 and a member of the council (Ratsherr) from 1881 to 1887. From 1887 to 1890 he was a member of the cantonal government (Regierungsrat), in charge of health and agriculture, and from 1890 to 1898 he was deputy Landammann (Landesstatthalter). From 1884 to 1898 he was a member of the National Council for the Democratic and Workers' Party (Demokratische und Arbeiterpartei).

In 1886 Schindler was president of the agricultural society of the canton of Glarus (Landwirtschaftlicher Verein des Kantons Glarus), and he initiated the cantonal insurance of movable property (Mobiliarversicherung). He represented the interests of the workers. He died in Mollis on 27 December 1898.

== Bibliography ==
- E. Gruner, Die schweizerische Bundesversammlung 1848–1920, 1, 1966, 356
- Glarus und die Schweiz, 1991, 77 f.
