= Eduard Marti =

Swiss politician

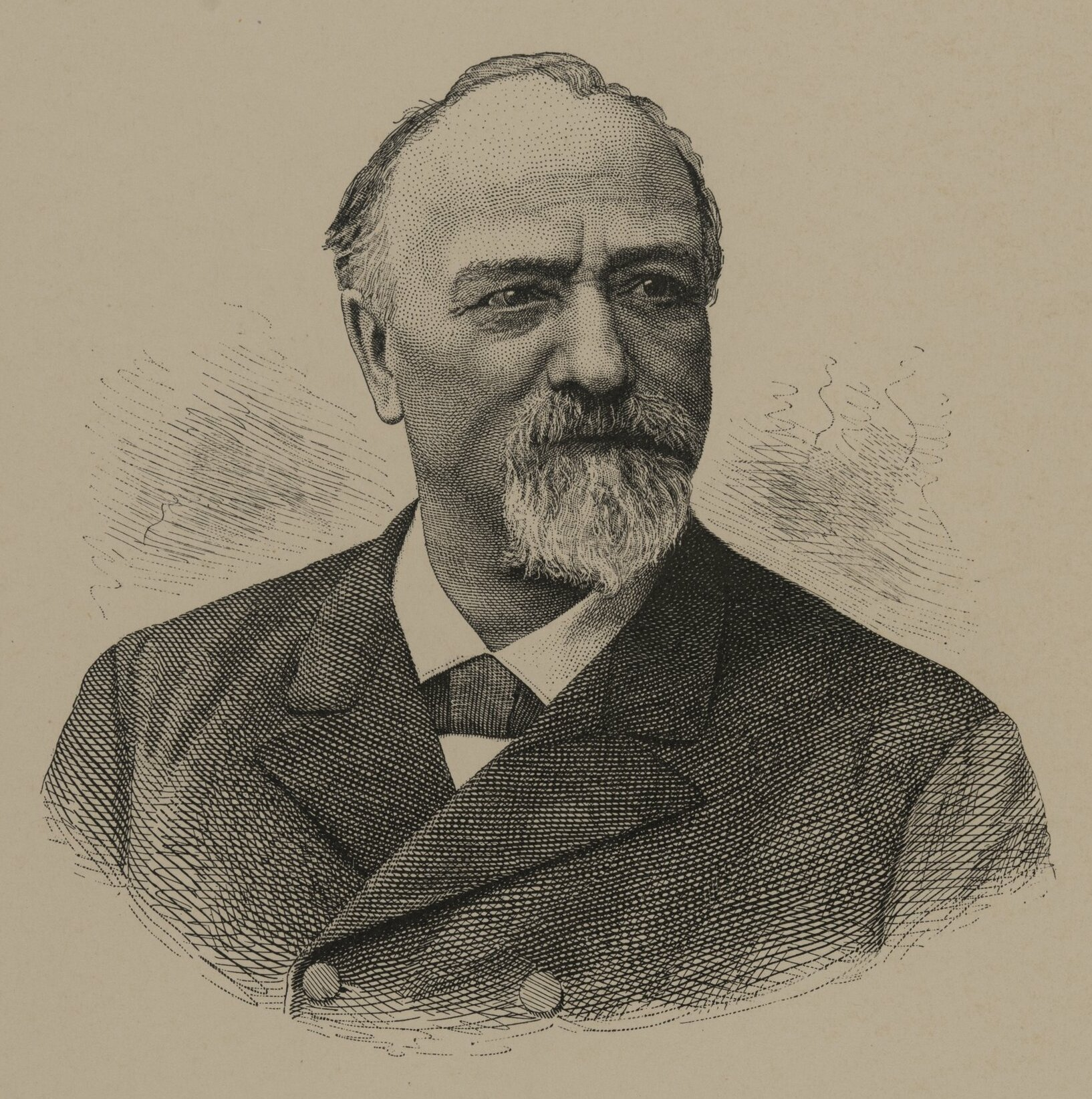
Eduard Marti

Eduard Marti (12 October 1829 – 5 November 1896) was a Swiss politician and President of the Swiss National Council (1877/1878).

Preceded by Arnold Otto Aepli	President of the National Council; 1877/1878	Succeeded by Jules Philippin
