= Emil Frey =

Swiss politician and diplomat (1838-1922)

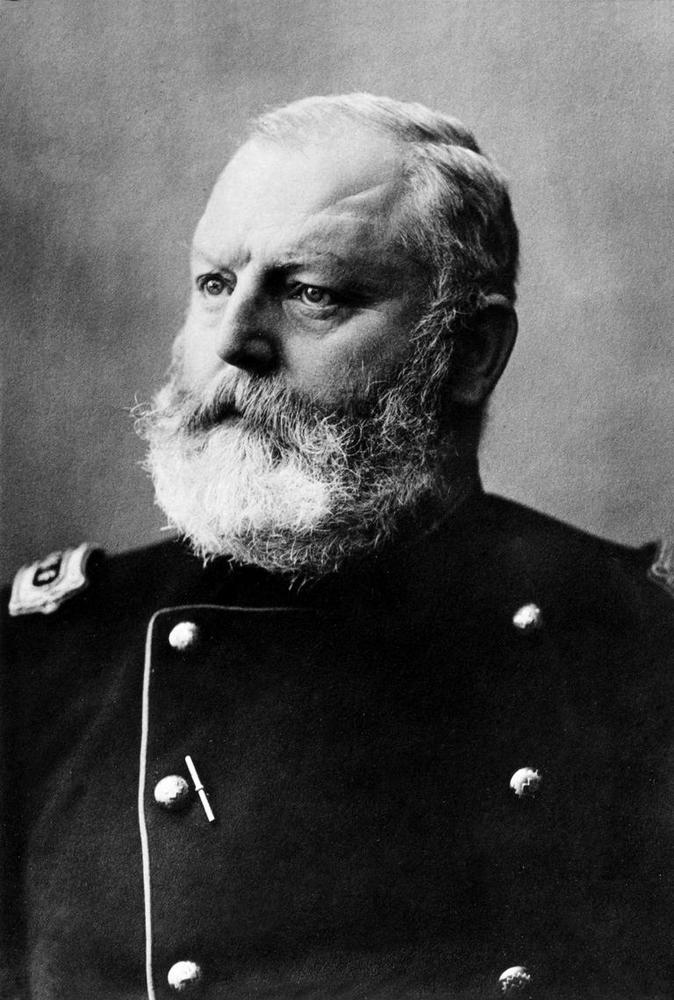
- Frey in 1890

President of Switzerland
- In office 1 January 1894 – 31 December 1894
- Preceded by: Karl Schenk
- Succeeded by: Josef Zemp

Head of the Military Department
- In office 1891–1897
- Preceded by: Walter Hauser
- Succeeded by: Eduard Müller

Swiss ambassador to the United States
- In office 1882–1888
- Preceded by: Office created
- Succeeded by: Alfred de Claparède

Director International Telegraph Union
- In office 11 March 1897 – 1 August 1921
- Preceded by: Timotheus Rothen
- Succeeded by: Henri Etienne

Personal details
- Born: 24 October 1838 Arlesheim, Switzerland
- Died: 24 December 1922 (aged 84) Arlesheim, Switzerland
- Citizenship: Switzerland; United States (since 1865)
- Party: Free Democratic Party
- Spouse: Emma Rosalie Kloss (m. 1870; died 1877)
- Children: 5
- Education: Agricultural Institute of Jena (dropped out)

Military service
- Battles/wars: American Civil War: Battle of Gettysburg (POW)

Emil Johann Rudolf Frey colloquially Emil Frey (24 October 1838 – 24 December 1922) was a Swiss politician who served on the Federal Council (Switzerland) from 1890 to 1897 and concurrently as President of the Swiss Confederation in 1894.

In 1860, Frey emigrated to the United States, where the served in the American Civil War and ultimately became an American citizen, before returning to Switzerland in 1865. In 1882, he was appointed to serve as the initial Swiss Minister to the United States, an office which he ultimately held until 1888.

== Early life and education ==
Frey was born 24 October 1838 in Arlesheim, Switzerland, the second of eight children, to Emil Remigius Frey (1803–1889), a liberal separatist politician, and Henriette Frey (née Chatoney; 1813–1880), into an affluent Protestant family.

His paternal family belonged to the bourgeoisie of Arlesheim in Basel-Landschaft. His father was an influential and well connected jurist and politician who served in several offices most notably on the Council of States (Switzerland). His mother was originally from Murten in Fribourg. Frey's family provided refuge for Friedrich Hecker when he fled the repression following the revolution in Germany in 1848.

After attending gymnasium in Basel, Frey went to study in an agronomical institute in Jena. In 1860 he emigrated to the United States, arriving in Belleville, Illinois, an area with many Forty-Eighters, veterans of the 1848 revolutions in Europe. For a while he worked for Hecker, but they had a falling-out.

== Military career ==
=== American Civil War ===
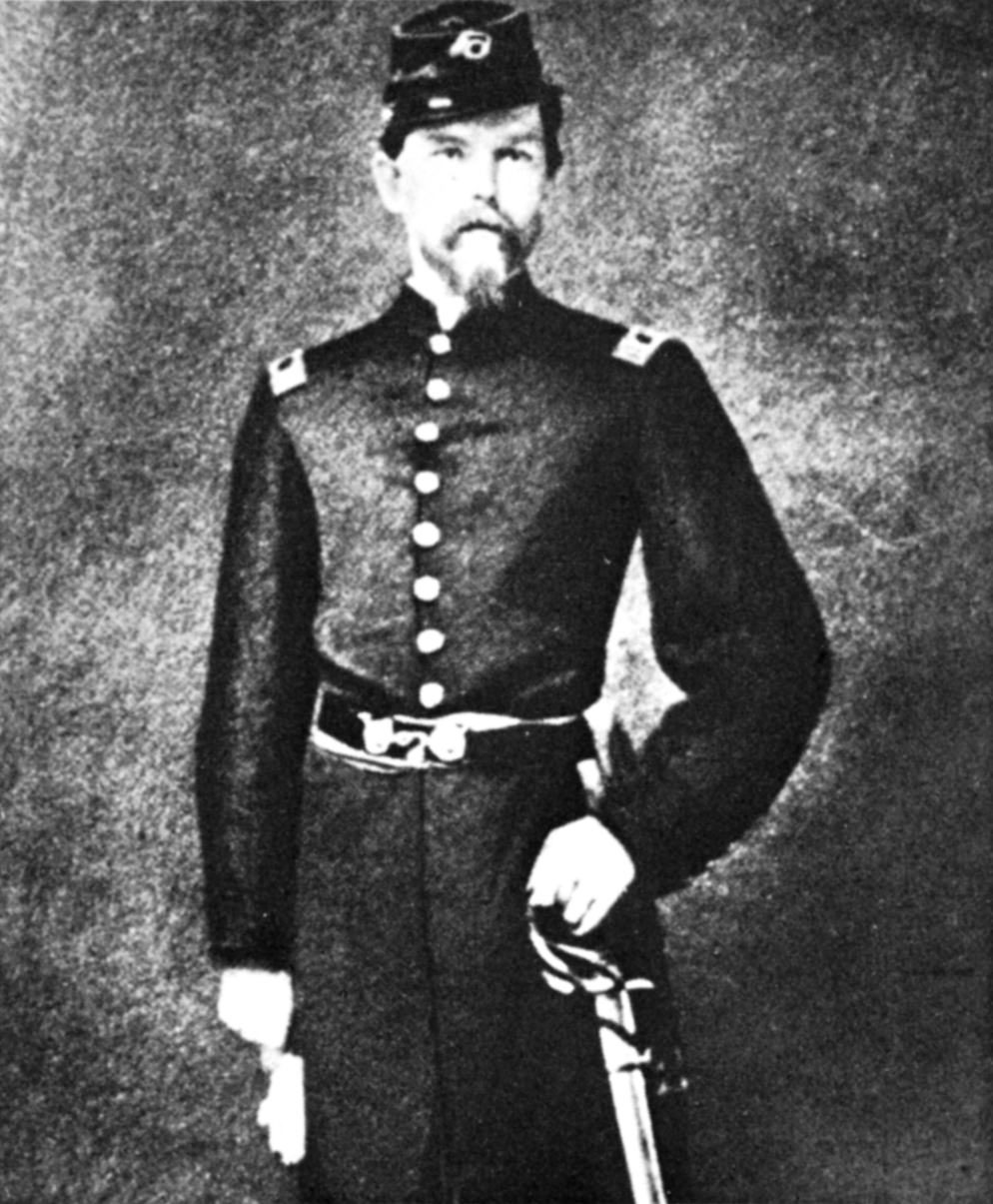
Frey in the Union Army, 1862

Frey enlisted in the Union Army's 24th Illinois Infantry Regiment as a private. He wrote in his essay "My American Experiences" that "on 17th of June [1861] I enlisted in the 24th at Chicago. On that same day I was appointed by Colonel Hecker to be the colorbearer of the regiment, and in the evening we left Chicago for Alton, Ill." Hecker was his commander, and they became friends again, with Frey sharing a tent with Hecker's son. Frey was later promoted to first lieutenant but resigned on 17 June 1862.

Frey raised the 82nd Illinois Infantry Regiment (known as "Second Hecker Regiment") and was the regiment's acting colonel at the Battle of Gettysburg in July 1863. He was taken prisoner on the first day of the Battle of Gettysburg, and following held in Libby Prison for eighteen months before being exchanged for Captain Gordon, a Confederate prisoner who had been sentenced to death. Frey held the rank of major at the end of the war . He rescinded his Swiss citizenship on 14 July 1864, and took on the American.

=== Swiss Army ===
He didn't count with the mandatory military service in Switzerland, but on his return from the United States, in view of his experience from the American civil war, he was made a major of the Swiss Army from the beginning. When he assumed as a Federal Councillor, he had the rank of a Colonel.

== Political career ==
After the Civil War, Frey returned to Switzerland. From 1866 to 1872, he was a member of the cantonal government of Basel-Country. Not satisfied with the salary as politician he shortly was an editor for the journal Basler Nachrichten in 1872. The same year, Frey was elected to the Swiss National Council, council he presided in 1875/1876.

From 1882 to 1888, Frey was the first ambassador (Minister) of Switzerland to the United States in Washington. The US President Chester A. Arthur saw him as the representative for both states. During his tenure as ambassador, he always stayed the summers in Arlesheim, his hometown.

He was elected to the Federal Council of Switzerland on 11 December 1890 and handed over office on 31 March 1897. He was affiliated to the Free Democratic Party. During his office time he held the Military Department. During his tenure he tried to introduce a military reform, but in a referendum the people voted against it. He was confirmed as a Federal Councillor in December 1896, but he resigned from office in 1897.

He was President of the Confederation in 1894.

== International Telegraph Union ==
In 1897, following his retirement from his second period as a member of Switzerland’s National Council, Frey was nominated as Director of the ITU Bureau at the ITU Plenipotentiary Conference to replace Timotheus Rothen. He held the post for almost a quarter of a century and took part in the International Telegraph Conferences of 1903 in London and 1908 Lisbon.

After leaving ITU in August 1921, Frey died, two months after his eighty-fifth birthday, on Christmas Eve 1922.

== Personal life ==
In 1870, Frey married Emma Rosalie Kloss (1848–1877), a daughter of Polish-born Carl Kloss (1809–1870), originally of Wielun, Duchy of Warsaw, and Margaretha Seiler (1800–1860), of Liestal. They had five children;

- Carl Emil "Hans" Frey (1871–1913), a physician, who married Chilean-born Adela Louisa Gabler von Coester (1879–1952), with issue.
- Rudolf Carl "Emil" Frey (1872–1913), married Margaretha Isabella Bruggisser (1883–1952), with issue.
- Carl Frey (1873–1934), married Adele Debrut (1888–1951), with issue.
- Anna Emma Henriette Frey (1874–1893), unmarried and without issue.
- Helena Frey (1876–1944), married Heinrich Hermann Haeberlin (1862–1938), without issue.

His wife died aged only 28 in 1877 from pulmonary tuberculosis. Frey did not marry again.

He became a naturalized American citizen on 14 July 1865 in St. Louis, Missouri. He remained a dual citizen of Switzerland and the United States for the remainder of his life.

Frey passed away on 24 December 1922 in Arlesheim, Switzerland aged 84.

== Literary works ==
- Aus den Erlebnissen eines Schweizers im Sezessionskriege, Bern 1893, (translated: "From the experiences of a Swiss in the War of Secession")
- Die Kriegstaten der Schweizer, dem Volk erzählt, Neuchâtel 1905, (translated: "The Swiss Acts of War, told to the People")

== See also ==
Preceded by Jakob Stämpfli	President of the Swiss National Council; 1875/1876	Succeeded by Arnold Otto Aepli
Preceded by Bernhard Hammer	Member of the Swiss Federal Council; 1890–1897	Succeeded by Ernst Brenner
Preceded by Timotheus Rothen	Director International Telegraph Union; 1897–1921	Succeeded by Henri Etienne
