= Ludwig Forrer =

Swiss politician (1845–1921)

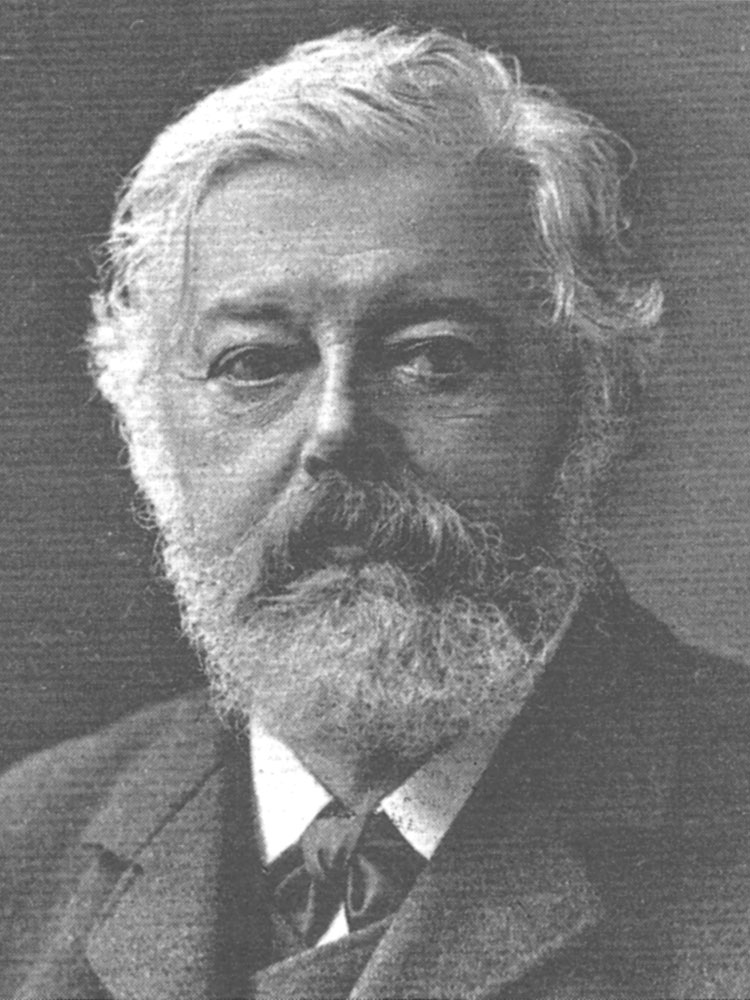

President of Switzerland
- In office 1 January 1912 – 31 December 1912
- Preceded by: Marc-Émile Ruchet
- Succeeded by: Eduard Müller
- In office 1 January 1906 – 31 December 1906
- Preceded by: Marc-Émile Ruchet
- Succeeded by: Eduard Müller

Swiss Federal Councillor
- In office 11 December 1902 – 31 December 1917
- Preceded by: Walter Hauser
- Succeeded by: Robert Haab

Personal details
- Born: 9 February 1845 Islikon, Thurgau, Switzerland
- Died: 28 September 1921 (aged 76) Bern, Switzerland
- Party: Free Democratic Party

Ludwig Forrer (9 February 1845 – 28 September 1921) was a Swiss politician who was a Federal Councillor from 1902 to 1917.

Forrer was born in Islikon. He was elected to the Swiss Federal Council on 11 December 1902 and resigned on 31 December 1917. He was affiliated with the Free Democratic Party.

During his office time he held the following departments:

- Department of Trade, Industry and Agriculture (1903)
- Department of Home Affairs (1904–1905)
- Political Department (1906) as President of the Confederation
- Military Department (1907)
- Department of Justice and Police (1908)
- Department of Posts and Railways (1908–1911)
- Political Department (1912) as President of the Confederation
- Department of Posts and Railways (1913–1917)

He was President of the Confederation twice in 1906 and 1912.

Political offices
Preceded by Albert Brosi	President of the National Council; 1893	Succeeded by Robert Comtesse
Preceded by Walter Hauser	Member of the Swiss Federal Council; 1902–1917	Succeeded by Robert Haab
