= Olivier Zschokke =

- Zschokke in 1877

Member of the National Council (Switzerland)
- In office 1 December 1890 – 1 December 1897

Member of the Council of States (Switzerland)
- In office 4 June 1877 – 1 December 1885

Personal details
- Born: Peter Olivier Zschokke; 22 July 1826 Aarau, Switzerland
- Died: 9 April 1898 (aged 71) Aarau, Switzerland
- Spouse: Anna Maria Sauerländer (m. 1854)
- Children: Friedrich
- Parent: Heinrich Zschokke (father)
- Occupation: Businessman, engineer, politician
- Website: Parliament website

Peter Olivier Zschokke commonly P. Olivier Zschokke (German pronunciation: [ɔˈliːvi̯eːʁ ʧɔkə]; 22 July 1826 - 9 April 1898) was a Swiss business magnate, engineer and politician who served on the National Council (Switzerland) from 1890 to 1897 and previously served on the Council of States (Switzerland) from 1877 to 1885 for the Free Radical Liberals.

Zschokke was a son of Heinrich Zschokke, who migrated to Switzerland originally being from Magdeburg in Saxony-Anhalt. He held a variety of interests in construction and railway companies. Z. was married to Anna Maria Sauerländer, daughter of Fritz Sauerländer, a well-known publisher.
