= Adrien Thélin =

Swiss politician

Adrien Thélin (11 October 1842 – 4 May 1922) was a Swiss politician and President of the Swiss National Council (1898/1899) and Council of States (1908/1909).

Preceded by Robert Grieshaber	President of the National Council; 1898/1899	Succeeded by Hermann Heller
Preceded by Paul Scherrer	President of the Council of States; 1908/1909	Succeeded by Paul Usteri
