= Paul Speiser =

Swiss politician (1846–1935)

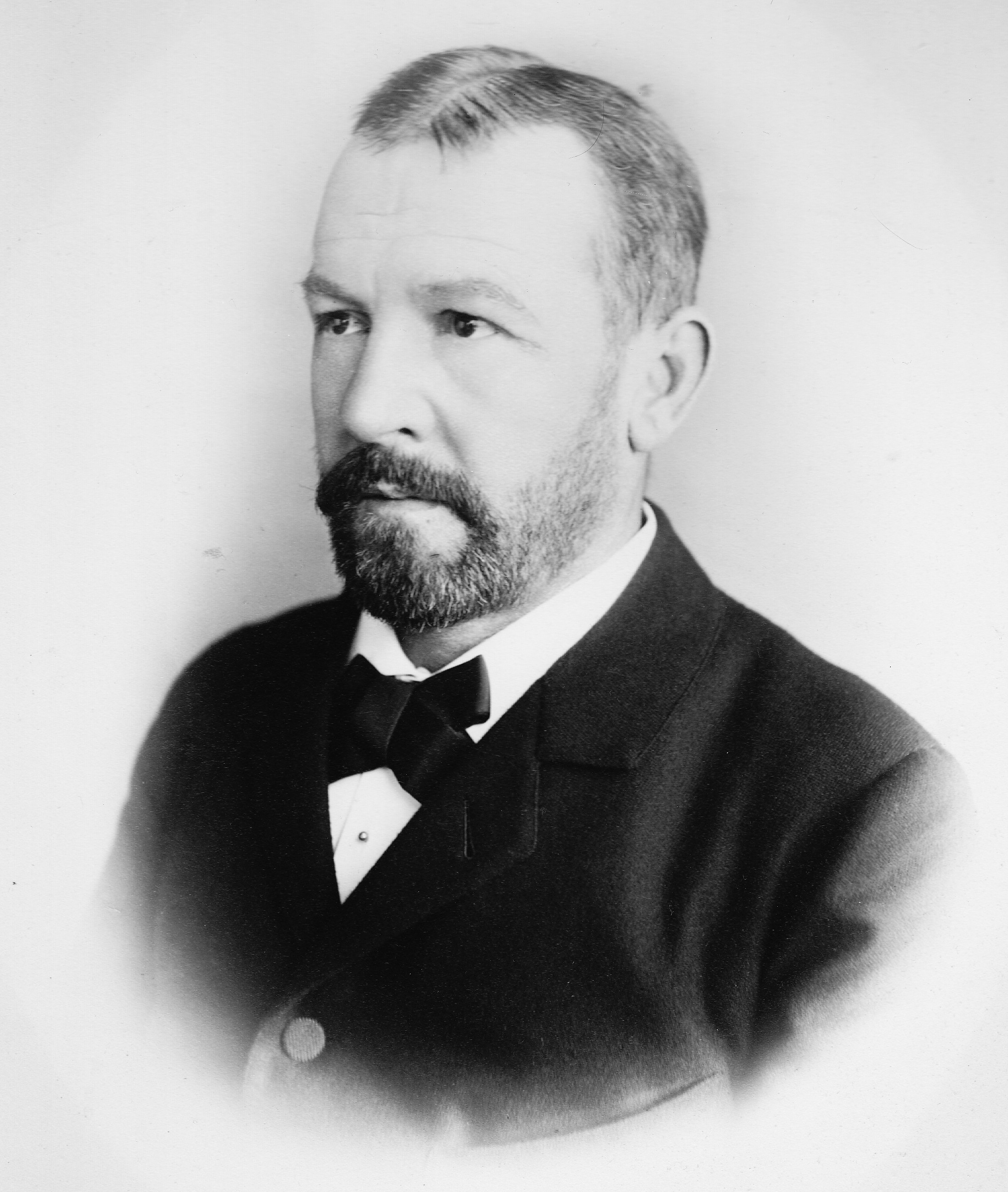
Paul Speiser (c. 1875)

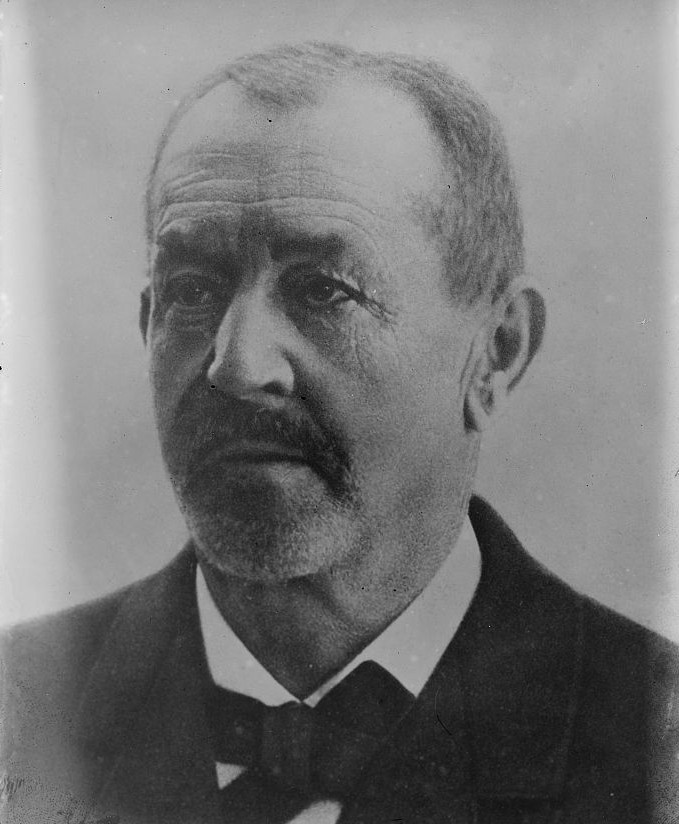
Paul Speiser (c. 1915)

Paul Speiser (16 October 1846, in Basel – 9 October 1935) was a Swiss politician and President of the Swiss National Council (1907/1908).

== Works ==
- Speiser, Paul (1935). Erinnerungen aus meiner Öffentlichen Tätigkeit von 1875-1919 (in German). Frobenius A.-G.

Preceded by Camille Decoppet	President of the National Council; 1907/1908	Succeeded by Adolf Germann
