= Erwin Kurz =

Swiss politician

Erwin Kurz (29 April 1846 in Aarau – 8 February 1901) was a Swiss politician and President of the Swiss National Council (1887/1888).

Preceded by Josef Zemp	President of the National Council; 1887/1888	Succeeded by Eugène Ruffy
