= Walter Hauser =

Swiss politician (1837-1902)

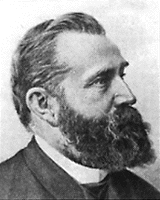

President of Switzerland
- In office 1 January 1900 – 31 December 1900
- Preceded by: Eduard Müller
- Succeeded by: Ernst Brenner
- In office 1 January 1892 – 31 December 1892
- Preceded by: Emil Welti
- Succeeded by: Karl Schenk

Swiss Federal Councillor
- In office 13 December 1888 – 22 October 1902
- Preceded by: Wilhelm Hertenstein
- Succeeded by: Ludwig Forrer

Personal details
- Born: 1 May 1837 Wädenswil, Canton of Zurich, Switzerland
- Died: 22 October 1902 (aged 65)
- Party: Free Democratic Party

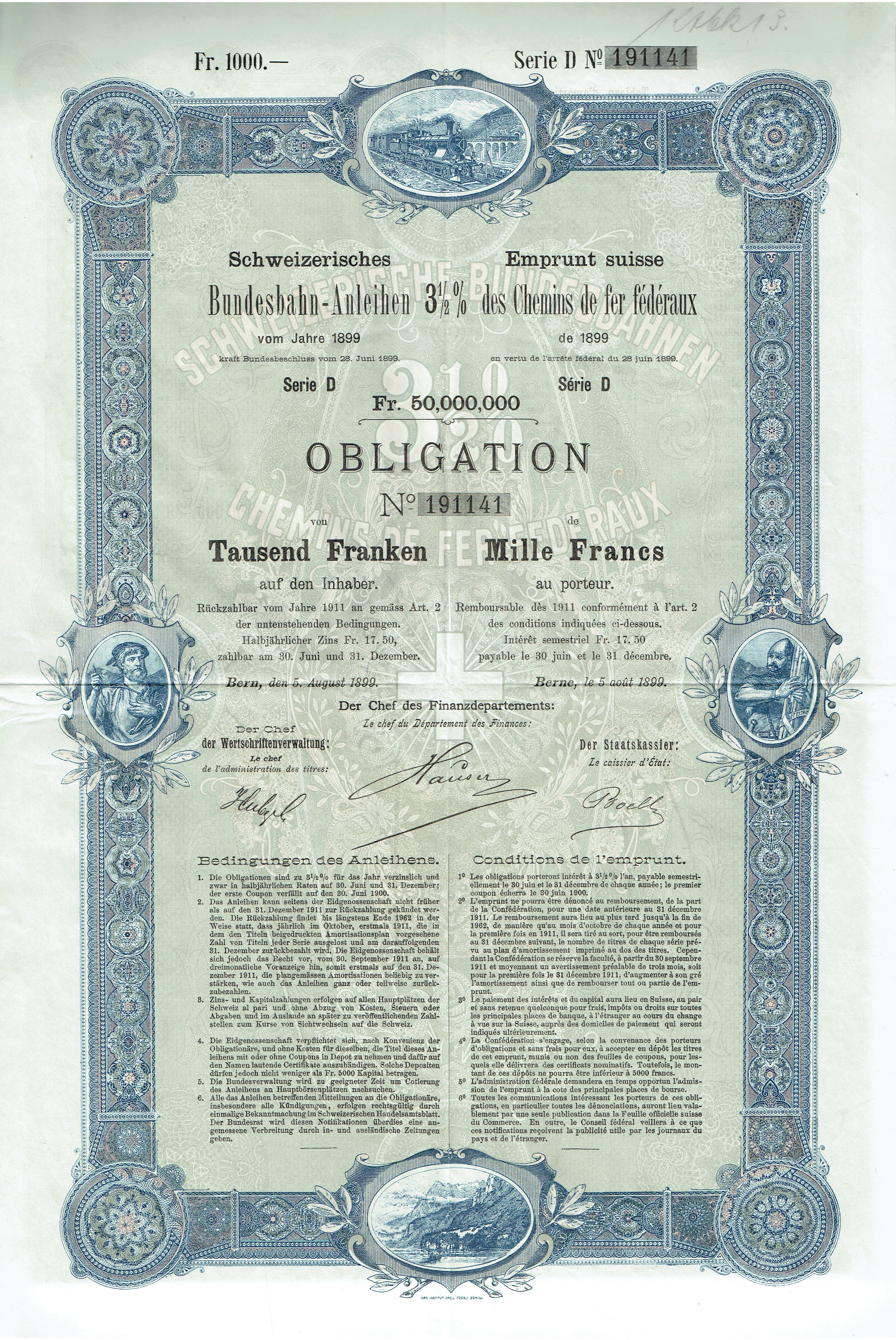
Bond for the Swiss Federal Railways, issued 28 June 1899, signed by Walter Hauser as the boss of the Department of Finance

Walter Hauser (1 May 1837 – 22 October 1902) was a Swiss politician who was a Federal Councillor from 1888 to 1902.

== Career ==
Open to technical innovations, Hauser was one of the founders of the left bank of the Zurichseebahn in 1859, the Wädenswil-Einsiedeln-Bahn in 1870 and the Wädenswil gasworks in 1874.

He was elected to the Federal Council on 13 December 1888 and died in office on 22 October 1902. He was affiliated to the Free Democratic Party of Switzerland.

During his office time he held the following departments:

- Military Department (1889–1890)
- Department of Finance (1891–1899)
- Political Department (1900)
- Department of Finance (1901–1902)

He was President of the Confederation twice in 1892 and 1900.

== Family ==
Hauser was born into the family of Jakob Arnold Hauser and Emilie Theiler. In 1865, he married Marie-Sophie Wiedeman.

== Commemoration ==
Walther-Hauser-Strasse in Wädenswil is named after him.

Political offices
Preceded by Wilhelm Vigier	President of the Council of States; 1883/1884	Succeeded by Martin Birmann
Preceded by Wilhelm Hertenstein	Member of the Swiss Federal Council; 1888–1902	Succeeded by Ludwig Forrer
