= Josef Zemp =

Swiss politician (1834–1908)

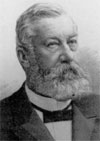

President of Switzerland
- In office 1 January 1902 – 31 December 1902
- Preceded by: Ernst Brenner
- Succeeded by: Adolf Deucher
- In office 1 January 1895 – 31 December 1895
- Preceded by: Emil Frey
- Succeeded by: Adrien Lachenal

Swiss Federal Councillor
- In office 17 December 1891 – 17 June 1908
- Preceded by: Emil Welti
- Succeeded by: Josef Anton Schobinger

Personal details
- Born: 2 September 1834 Entlebuch, Lucerne, Switzerland
- Died: 8 December 1908 (aged 74)

Josef Zemp (2 September 1834 – 8 December 1908) was a Swiss politician and member of the Swiss Federal Council (1891–1908).

On 17 December 1891, he was the first member of a conservative party to be elected to the Federal Council of Switzerland. He was affiliated with the Christian Democratic People's Party of Switzerland. He left office on 17 June 1908, only a few months prior to his death.

During his time in office he held the following departments:

- Department of Posts and Railways (1892–1901)
- Political Department as President of the Confederation (1902)
- Department of Posts and Railways (1903–1908)

He was President of the Confederation twice in 1895 and 1902.

Political offices
Preceded by Henri Morel	President of the National Council; 1887	Succeeded by Erwin Kurz
Preceded by Emil Welti	Member of the Swiss Federal Council; 1891–1908	Succeeded by Josef Anton Schobinger
