= Jakob Huldreich Bachmann =

Swiss politician

Jakob Huldreich Bachmann (21 November 1843, in Stettfurt – 26 August 1915) was a Swiss politician, President of the Swiss National Council (1895/1896) and President of the Federal Supreme Court (1903/1904).

== Works ==
- Bachmann, Jakob Huldreich (1887). Die Grundzüge des Entwurfes eines eidgenössischen Betreibungs- und Konkursgesetzes: Rede im Nationalrat d. 13. April 1887 (in German).

| Preceded by Ernst Brenner | President of the National Council; 1895/1896 | Succeeded by Joseph Stockmar |
