= Carl Hilty =

Swiss lawyer and philosopher (1833–1909)

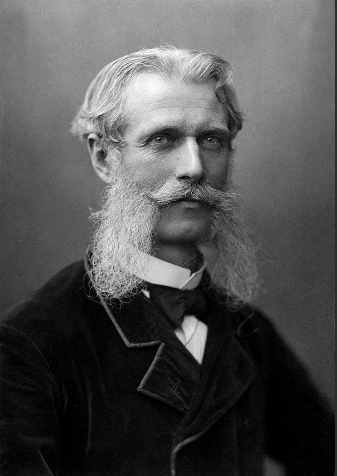
- Born: 28 February 1833; Werdenberg, Canton of St. Gallen, Switzerland
- Died: 12 October 1909 (aged 76); Clarens, Switzerland
- Education: University of Göttingen, Heidelberg University
- Employer(s): Swiss Armed Forces, University of Bern

Carl Andreas Hilty (28 February 1833 – 12 October 1909) was a Swiss lawyer, professor of constitutional law, politician, philosopher, lay theologian and writer.

== Family background ==
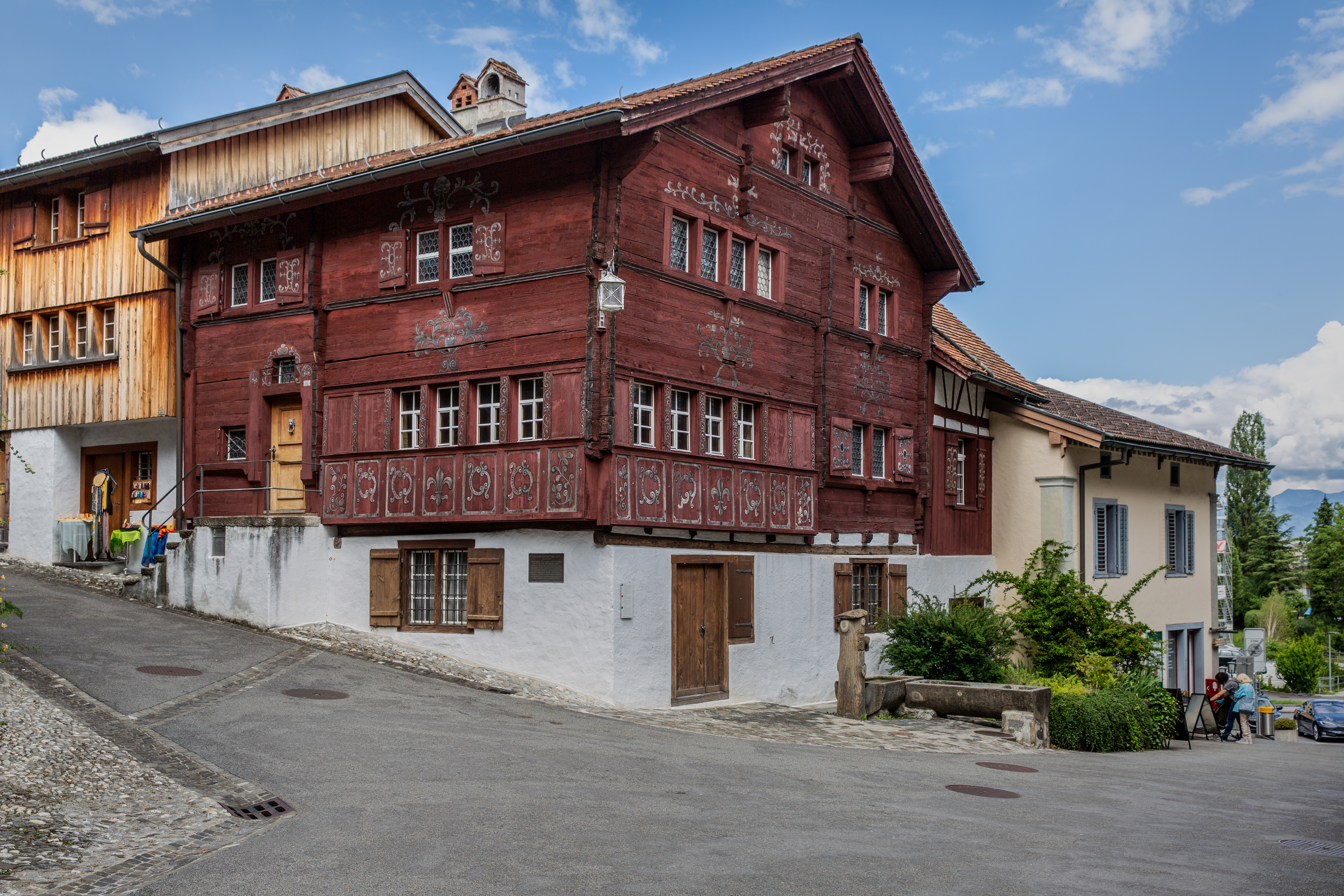
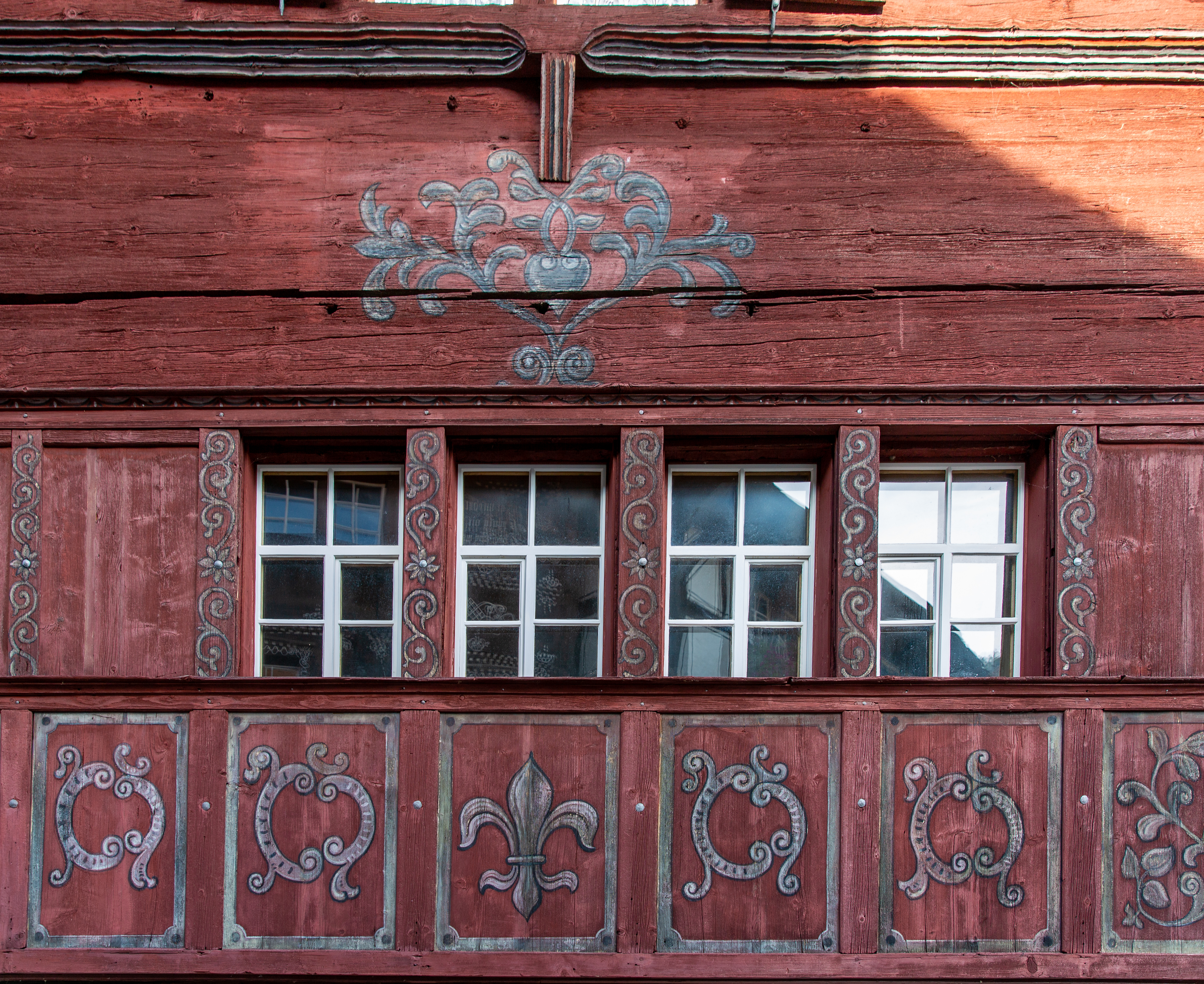
"The Red House", Hilty's birthplace, with the coat of arms of the non-aristocratic family: a fleur-de-lis on a red background

Hilty was born in the small town of Werdenberg in the canton of St. Gallen in northeastern Switzerland. His father was the physician Johann Ulrich Hilty, who practised medicine in Chur, the capital of the eastern canton of the Grisons. His family had been based in Werdenberg for centuries and in 1835 he bought the crumbling Werdenberg Castle at an auction. Hilty's mother Elisabeth (née Kilias) hailed from Chur and was the daughter of a former regimental doctor of the French Army. She died in 1847.

== Education ==
Hilty grew up in Chur, where he first attended the public primary school and then the canton school of the Swiss Reformed Church. From 1851 until 1853 Hilty studied jurisprudence in Germany at the University of Göttingen. In 1854 he acquired his doctorate of both laws at Heidelberg University. He subsequently spent some time in London and Paris in order to improve his language skills.

From 1855 onwards he was the director of a law firm in Chur for almost two decades. As a non-citizen of the Grisons he soon emerged as a prominent proponent of direct democracy.

== Marriage ==
In 1857, after an engagement period of just a few months, Hilty married Johanna Gaertner, who hailed from a family of legal scholars in Prussia. Her father Gustav, who already died in 1842, was a professor of law at the University of Bonn. Her mother Marie Simon, who was born in Breslau as the daughter of a judge and one-time chairman of the Prussian examination board of jurists, had written and published a political novel about the German revolutions of 1848–1849. Like her brother Heinrich Simon, who had been a prominent member of the Frankfurt Parliament, she apparently had to escape anti-democratic and anti-liberal repressions in the reactionary era that followed the subdued revolutions and joined him in his Swiss exile. Johanna's god-father was the nationalist and pro-democracy writer Ernst Moritz Arndt, who had been a member of the Frankfurt Parliament as well.

Hilty's sister Anna was married to the jurist and brigadier Hand Hold, one of the leading Grisonian liberals during the second half of the 19th century.

== Public career in the Army, Academia, and Parliament ==
In 1862, Hilty joined the legal staff of the Swiss Armed Forces in addition to his work in his law firm.

In 1872, he also became a member of the Great City Council of Chur.

In 1874, he became a professor of constitutional law at the University of Bern.

Hilty was a spokesman for women's rights to vote and to be elected, several decades before the subject became mainstream. Hilty argued that Switzerland, as a nation-state comprising several nationalities and languages, had a unique mission of demonstrating that a nation-state could transcend tribal tendencies.

In 1890, he became a member of the National Council.

== Happiness and Political Yearbooks ==
From 1886, he edited Politisches Jahrbuch der schweizerischen Eidgenossenschaft (The Journal of Swiss Jurisprudence)

Hilty's philosophical concern was practical in nature. He wrote about happiness, the meaning of life and work, developing good habits, time management, and winning the battles of life. He became famous from his writings about happiness, which first appeared in three volumes in 1891, 1895 and 1899. These essays were eventually collected into a single volume entitled: "Happiness: Essays on the Meaning of Life". In this work, Hilty combines ancient stoic thought with Christian beliefs. The work was translated into English by Prof. Francis Greenwood Peabody, Professor of Christian Morals at Harvard University, and first appeared in the United States in 1903.

Hilty supported the Salvation Army, which opened their services in Zurich. At first he made jokes about their noisy appearance, but only a few years later, he recognized them as one of the few groups who were able to put the words of Jesus in practice. Hilty was in his time one of the few intellectuals who still believed in the Gospel, while many other intellectuals dedicated themselves to the so-called "monastic" philosophy following the new sciences after Darwin. He believed in a new reformation beyond the dogmas of churches and politics, after the time of materialism.

He famously said: "Peace is only a hair's breadth away from war." Although a Christian, he was not a pacifist, and expected the coming world war.

== Final years ==
His wife Johanna died in 1897. Hilty died in Clarens in 1909.

== Legacy ==
Hilty's work influenced the thinking of William James.

== Books ==
Academic:

- Theoretiker und Idealisten der Demokratie (Theorists and Idealists of Democracy), Bern, 1868
- Ideen und Ideale schweizerischer Politik (Ideas and Ideals of Swiss Politics), Bern, 1875
- Vorlesungen über die Politik der Eidgenossenschaft (Lectures on the Swiss Political System), Bern, 1879
- Ueber die Wiedereinfuhrung der Todesstrafe (On Capital Punishment), Bern, 1879
- Die Neutralität der Schweiz in ihrer heutigen Auffassung (The Neutrality of Switzerland), Bern, 1889

(translated into French by Mentha, 1889)

- Das Referendum im schweizerischen Staatsrecht (The Referendum in Switzerland), Archiv für öffentliches Recht, 1887
- Der Burenkrieg (The Boer War), Bern, 1900.

Personal:

- Glück (Happiness ), 1891, (translated into Dutch by Eduard Fimmen, 1903) .
- Lesen und Reden (On Reading and Speaking), 1891
- Für schlaflose Nächte (For Sleepless Nights), 1901.
