= Friedrich Heinrich Häberlin =

Swiss politician (1834–1897)

Friedrich Heinrich Häberlin (16 December 1834 in Bissegg – 16 October 1897) was a Swiss politician and President of the Swiss National Council (1889/1890).

His brother Eduard Häberlin (1820–1884) was President of the Swiss Council of States (1863).

His son Heinrich Häberlin (1868–1947) became a member of the Federal Council (1920–1934).

| Preceded by Eugène Ruffy | President of the National Council; 1889/1890 | Succeeded by August Suter |
