= Robert Grieshaber =

Swiss politician

Robert Grieshaber (23 April 1846, in Hallau – 25 October 1928) was a Swiss politician and President of the Swiss National Council (1897/1898).

Preceded by Johann Joseph Keel	President of the National Council; 1897/1898	Succeeded by Adrien Thélin
