= Rudolf Gallati =

Swiss politician (1845–1904)

Rudolf Gallati (16 April 1845, in Glarus – 3 November 1904) was a Swiss politician and President of the Swiss National Council (1896).

| Preceded by Joseph Stockmar | President of the National Council; 1896 | Succeeded by Johann Josef Keel |
