= Joseph Stockmar =

Swiss politician

Joseph Stockmar (30 March 1851, in Courchavon – 28 July 1919) was a Swiss politician and President of the Swiss National Council (1896).

== Works ==
- Stockmar, Joseph (1920). Histoire du chemin de fer du Simplon (PDF) (in French). Lausanne: Payot & cie.

Preceded by Jakob Huldreich Bachmann	President of the National Council; 1896	Succeeded by Rudolf Gallati
