= Hans Konrad Pestalozzi =

Swiss architect and politician (1848-1909)

- Born: July 2, 1848; Zurich, Switzerland
- Died: June 15, 1909 (aged 60); Zurich, Switzerland
- Occupations: Architect, politician
- Spouse: Maria Wilhelmine Stadler (m. 1876)
- Parent(s): Salomon Pestalozzi; Cleophea Margaretha Hirzel

Hans Konrad Pestalozzi (2 July 1848 – 15 June 1909) was a Swiss architect and politician who served as mayor (president) of the city of Zurich from 1889 to 1909. He was also a member of the Swiss Federal Assembly, serving in both the National Council and the Grand Council of Zurich. Pestalozzi played a significant role in the urban development of Zurich during the late 19th and early 20th centuries.

== Early life and education ==
Hans Konrad Pestalozzi was born on 2 July 1848 in Zurich to a Protestant family. He was the son of Salomon Pestalozzi (from the Pestalozzi family branch known as "zum Brünneli"), who owned a raw silk business, and Cleophea Margaretha Hirzel.

Pestalozzi attended the industrial school in Zurich before pursuing higher education. He studied architecture at the Swiss Federal Institute of Technology (ETH) in Zurich under the renowned architect Gottfried Semper from 1865 to 1868. After completing his studies, he traveled to Paris, Vienna, and Rome to further his architectural knowledge and experience.

== Career ==
=== Architecture ===
Following his educational travels, Pestalozzi established himself as an architect in Zurich in 1874.

=== Politics ===
==== Municipal ====
Pestalozzi began his political career at the municipal level in Zurich. He served as a member of the Grand Council of the city of Zurich from 1879 to 1881, before being elected as a municipal councilor from 1881 to 1889, where he was responsible for public works. His competence in this role led to his election as president (mayor) of the city of Zurich in 1889, a position he held until his death in 1909.

As president of Zurich, Pestalozzi's most significant achievement was overseeing the incorporation of numerous suburban communities into the city of Zurich in 1893. This major administrative reform significantly expanded the city's boundaries and population. He was also actively involved in public assistance programs and urban development projects.

==== Cantonal and federal ====
Simultaneously with his municipal career, Pestalozzi served as a deputy in the Grand Council of the canton of Zurich from 1885 to 1909, serving as its president in 1901. At the federal level, he was elected to the National Council, where he served from 1890 to 1905.

Politically, Pestalozzi began as a liberal, then became a radical, but was not considered a strict party man. In the Federal Assembly, he initially positioned himself in the center, then from 1893 onwards as a liberal-democrat. He actively opposed the merger of liberals with the radical-democratic group.

=== Other activities ===
Beyond his political career, Pestalozzi held several important administrative positions. He served as an administrator of the Swiss Northeastern Railway from 1890 to 1902, and subsequently of the Swiss Federal Railways (SBB) from 1902 until his death in 1909. He chaired the commission of the Swiss National Museum from 1891 to 1909 and served as president of the Swiss Red Cross from 1908 to 1909.

Pestalozzi was one of the promoters of the Union of Swiss Cities and achieved the rank of colonel in the Swiss Army.

== Personal life ==
In 1876, Pestalozzi married Maria Wilhelmine Stadler, daughter of August Stadler, an architect.

== Death ==
Hans Konrad Pestalozzi died on 15 June 1909 in Zurich.

== Bibliography ==
- Pestalozzi-Keyser, Hans: Geschichte der Familie Pestalozzi, 1958, pp. 163-166.
- Gruner, Erich (ed.): L'Assemblée fédérale suisse 1848-1920, vol. 1, 1966, pp. 92-93.
