= Ernst Brenner =

Swiss politician (1856-1911)

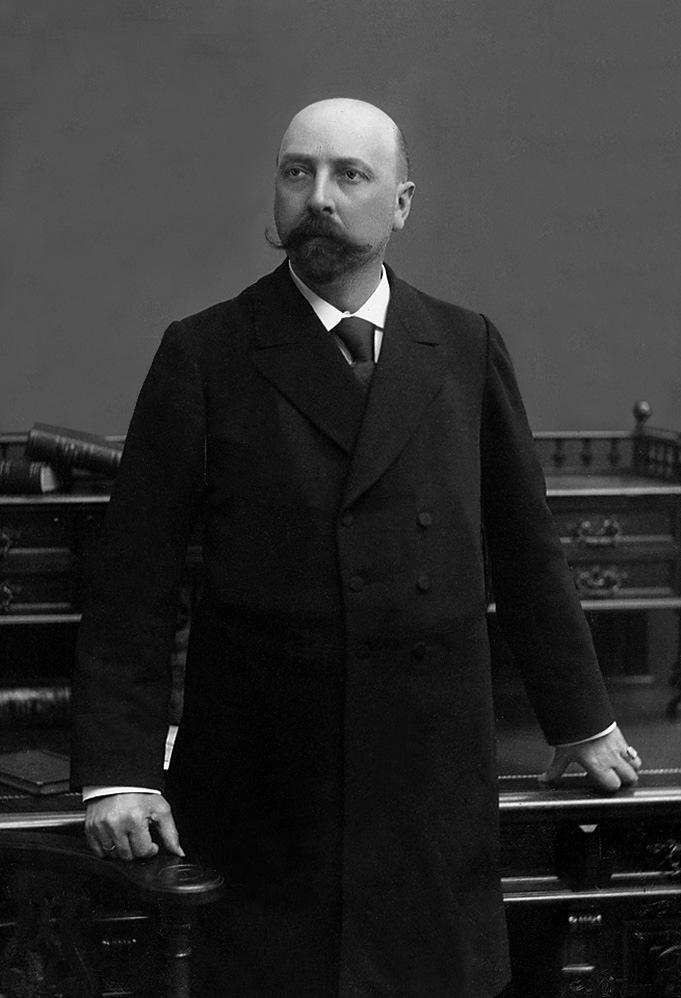

President of Switzerland
- In office 1 January 1908 – 31 December 1908
- Preceded by: Eduard Müller
- Succeeded by: Adolf Deucher
- In office 1 January 1901 – 31 December 1901
- Preceded by: Walter Hauser
- Succeeded by: Josef Zemp

Swiss Federal Councillor
- In office 25 March 1897 – 11 March 1911
- Preceded by: Emil Frey
- Succeeded by: Arthur Hoffmann

Personal details
- Born: 9 December 1856
- Died: 11 March 1911 (aged 54)
- Party: Free Democratic Party

Ernst Brenner (9 December 1856 – 11 March 1911) was a Swiss politician.

He was elected to the Federal Council of Switzerland on 25 March 1897 and died in office on 11 March 1911. He was affiliated with the Free Democratic Party.

During his office time he held the following departments:

- Department of Justice and Police (1897–1900)
- Political Department as President of the Confederation (1901)
- Department of Justice and Police (1902–1907)
- Political Department as President of the Confederation (1908)
- Department of Justice and Police (1909–1911)

Political offices
Preceded by Robert Comtesse	President of the National Council; 1894/1895	Succeeded by Jakob Huldreich Bachmann
Preceded by Emil Frey	Member of the Swiss Federal Council; 1897–1911	Succeeded by Arthur Hoffmann
