= Eugène Ruffy =

Swiss politician (1854–1919)

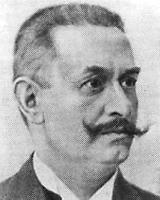

Member of the Swiss Federal Council
- In office 14 December 1893 – 31 October 1899

Personal details
- Born: 2 August 1854 Lutry, Vaud, Switzerland
- Died: 25 October 1919 (aged 65) Bern, Switzerland
- Relations: Victor Ruffy (father)

Eugène Ruffy (2 August 1854 – 25 October 1919) was a Swiss politician.

== Early life ==
Ruffy was born in Lutry on August 2, 1854 to politician Victor Ruffy (1823–1869) and Alice Mégroz. His maternal grandfather was Marc Auguste Louis, a silk merchant from Lyon.

Ruffy got his Bachelor of Law from Lausanne in 1877 and worked as an intern under Louis Ruchonnet.

== Career ==
He was elected to the Swiss Federal Council on 14 December 1893 and resigned on 31 October 1899. He was affiliated with the Free Democratic Party of Switzerland.

During his time in office he headed the following departments:

- Department of Justice and Police (1894)
- Department of Home Affairs (1895)
- Department of Justice and Police (1895)
- Department of Home Affairs (1896–1897)
- Political Department (1898)
- Military Department (1899)

He was President of the Confederation in 1898. After leaving the Federal Council, Ruffy served as director of the International Post Office until his death in 1919.

His father Victor Ruffy was a member of the Federal Council in 1868/1869. The younger Ruffy was the only person to succeed his father as a member of the council until the election of Eveline Widmer-Schlumpf in 2007.

Political offices
Preceded by Erwin Kurz	President of the National Council; 1888/1889	Succeeded by Heinrich Häberlin
Preceded by Louis Ruchonnet	Member of the Swiss Federal Council; 1893–1899	Succeeded by Marc-Emile Ruchet
