= Robert Comtesse =

Swiss politician (1847–1922)

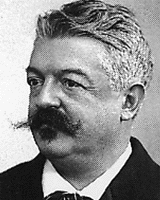

President of Switzerland
- In office 1 January 1910 – 31 December 1910
- Preceded by: Adolf Deucher
- Succeeded by: Marc-Émile Ruchet
- In office 1 January 1904 – 31 December 1904
- Preceded by: Adolf Deucher
- Succeeded by: Marc-Émile Ruchet

Swiss Federal Councillor
- In office 14 December 1899 – 4 March 1912
- Preceded by: Adrien Lachenal
- Succeeded by: Louis Perrier

Personal details
- Born: 14 August 1847 Valangin, Neuchâtel, Switzerland
- Died: 17 November 1922 (aged 75)
- Party: Free Democratic Party

Robert Comtesse (14 August 1847, in Valangin – 17 November 1922) was a Swiss politician and member of the Swiss Federal Council (1899-1912).

He was elected to the Federal Council of Switzerland on 14 December 1899 and resigned on 4 March 1912. He was affiliated with the Free Democratic Party.

== Federal Departments ==
While in office he held the following departments:

- Department of Finance (1900)
- Department of Justice and Police (1901)
- Department of Posts and Railways (1902, 1912)
- Department of Finance (1903, 1905–09, 1911)
- Political Department as President of the Confederation (1904, 1911)

== Honours ==
"Quai Robert-Comtesse" in Neuchâtel and "Rue Robert-Comtesse" in Cernier are named after Comtesse.

Political offices
Preceded by Ludwig Forrer	President of the National Council; 1893/1894	Succeeded by Ernst Brenner
Preceded by Adrien Lachenal	Member of the Swiss Federal Council; 1899–1912	Succeeded by Louis Perrier
