= Johann Joseph Keel =

Swiss politician

Member of National Council (Switzerland)
- In office 6 December 1875 – 12 August 1902
- Constituency: Canton of St. Gallen

Member of Cantonal Council of St. Gallen
- In office 1867 - 1870

Personal details
- Born: Johann Joseph Keel; 15 March 1837 St. Gallen, Switzerland
- Died: 12 August 1902 (aged 65) St. Gallen, Switzerland
- Spouses: Maria Magdalena Benziger (m. 1867; died 1879) * Anna von Schnüringer (m. 1883)
- Relations: Simonetta Sommaruga (great-great-granddaughter)
- Children: 8

Johann Joseph Keel (15 March 1837 – 12 August 1902) was a Swiss politician who served on the National Council (Switzerland) from 1875 to 1902, as well as its president during the legislative period of 1896/97, for the Catholic-Conservative party (which later merged with the Christian Democratic People's Party). He previously served as member of the Cantonal Council of St. Gallen from 1867 to 1870, as well as serving concurrently as governing councilor of St. Gallen between 1870 and 1902 (his death). Keel was a great-great-grandfather of Simonetta Sommaruga.

== Literature ==
- Fridolin Gschwend (1947). Landammann Dr. Johann Josef Keel, 1837-1902 (in German). Gebr. Oberholzer.

| Preceded by Rudolf Gallati | President of the National Council; 1896/1897 | Succeeded by Robert Grieshaber |
