= Demographics of the Swiss Federal Council =

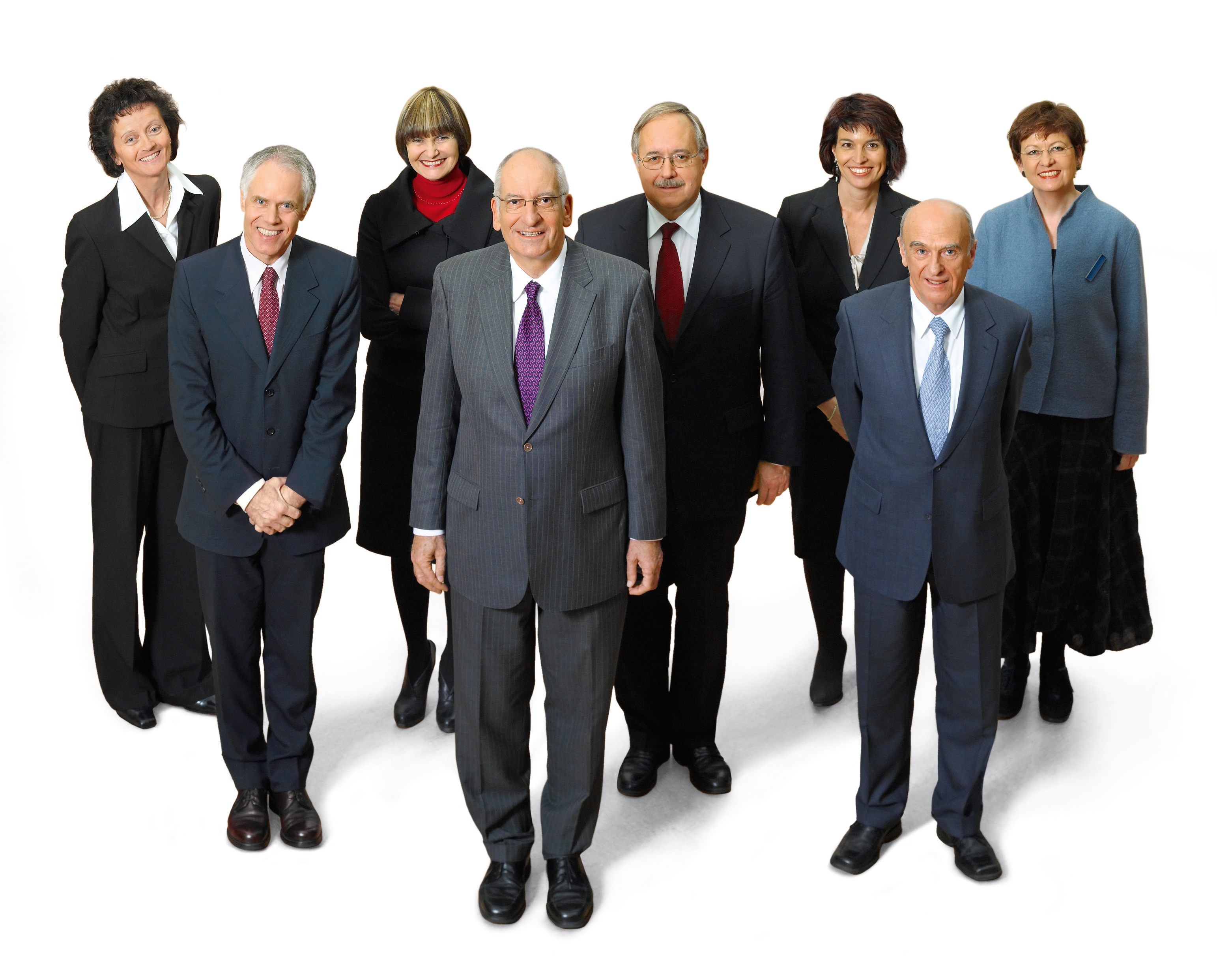
The Swiss Federal Council, 2008. Official photograph.

The tables below show information and statistics about the members of the Swiss Federal Council (in German: Bundesrat, in French: conseil fédéral, in Italian: consiglio federale), or Federal Councilors (in German: Bundesräte, in French: conseillers fédéraux, in Italian: consiglieri federali).

The Swiss Federal Council (German: Schweizerischer Bundesrat, French: Conseil fédéral suisse, Italian: Consiglio federale svizzero, Romansh: Cussegl federal svizzer) is the seven-member executive council which constitutes the government as well as the head of state of Switzerland. Each of the seven Federal Councillors heads a department of the Swiss federal government. The members of the Federal Council are elected for a term of four years by both chambers of the federal parliament sitting together as the Federal Assembly. Each Councillor is elected individually by secret ballot by an absolute majority of votes. Since 1848, the seven Councillors have never been replaced simultaneously, thus guaranteeing a continuity of the government.

Once elected for a four-year-term, Federal Councillors can neither be voted out of office by a motion of no confidence nor can they be impeached. Reelection is possible for an indefinite number of terms, and it has historically been extremely rare for Parliament not to reelect a sitting Councillor and this has only happened four times. In practice, therefore, Councillors serve until they decide to resign and retire to private life, usually after three to five terms of office.

== Parties ==
Parties	Members
FDP/PRD (Freisinnige, parti radical)	67
LPS/PLS	1
CVP/PDC (formerly KVP)	20
SVP/UDC (formerly BGB/PAI)	10
SPS/PSS	12

== Time in office ==
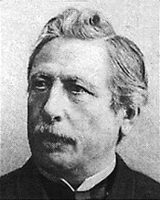
Longest time: Schenk died in his 32nd year in office.

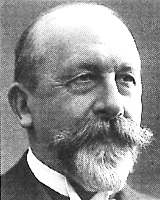
Shortest time: Perrier died just 14 months after his election.

The following tables do not include councilors currently in office.

Longest Time in Office
Years	Name	Term
31	Karl Schenk	1863–1895
29	Adolf Deucher	1883–1912
28	Giuseppe Motta	1911–1940
27	Wilhelm Matthias Naeff	1848–1875
25	Emil Welti	1866–1891
	Philipp Etter	1934–1959
24	Eduard Müller	1895–1919
22	Edmund Schulthess	1912–1935
20	Melchior Josef Martin Knüsel	1855–1875

Shortest Time in Office
Years	Name	Term
1	Louis Perrier	1912–1913
	Rudolf Friedrich	1982–1984
2	Gustave Ador	1917–1919
	Jean Bourgknecht	1959–1962
	Max Weber	1951–1954
	Victor Ruffy	1867–1869
3	Eugène Borel	1872–1875
	Joachim Heer	1875–1878
	Josef Anton Schobinger	1908–1911
4	Christoph Blocher	2003–2007
	Alphons Egli	1983–1986
	Elisabeth Kopp	1984–1989
	Josef Escher	1950–1954
	Ruth Metzler	1999–2003
5	Ernst Wetter	1938–1943
	Fridolin Anderwert	1875–1880
	Fritz Honegger	1977–1982
	Giuseppe Lepori	1954–1959
	Hermann Obrecht	1935–1940
	Paul Cérésole	1870–1875
	René Felber	1987–1993
	Thomas Holenstein	1955–1959

== Age (oldest and youngest) ==
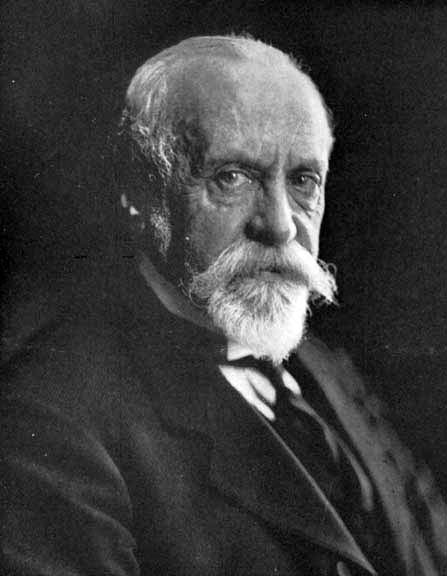
The Oldest: Ador was elected at age 72

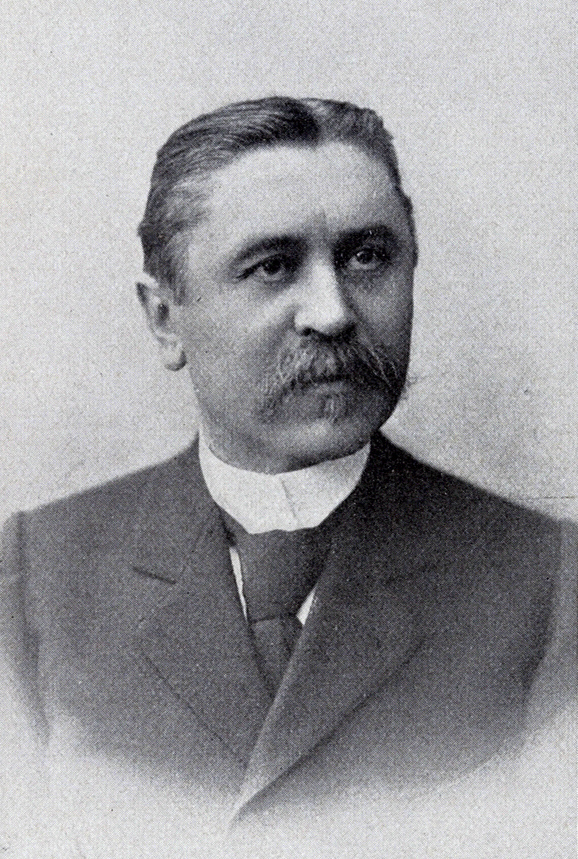
The Youngest: Numa Droz was 31 years old at his election

Age when elected
Age	Name	Elected
72	Gustave Ador	1917
65	Josef Escher	1950
63	Louis Perrier	1912
	Christoph Blocher	2003
62	Ernest Chuard	1919
61	Ernst Wetter	1938
	Hans Streuli	1953
	Pierre Graber	1969
	Hans-Rudolf Merz	2004
60	Fritz Honegger	1977
	Johannes Baumann	1934
...
39	Eugène Ruffy	1893
	Jakob Dubs	1861
	Marcel Pilet-Golaz	1928
38	Paul Cérésole	1870
37	Ulrich Ochsenbein	1848
36	Constant Fornerod	1855
	Eugène Borel	1872
35	Ruth Metzler	1999
34	Jakob Stämpfli	1854
31	Numa Droz	1875

Age when resigning/dying in office
Age	Name	Year
81	Adolf Deucher	1912
74	Gustave Ador	1919
73	Joseph Zemp	1908
	Wilhelm Matthias Naeff	1875
72	Ludwig Forrer	1917
71	Karl Schenk	1895
	Ernest Chuard	1928
70	Eduard Müller	1919
	Eduard von Steiger	1951
...
50	Adrien Lachenal	1899
49	Jakob Dubs	1872
48	Constant Fornerod	1867
	Numa Droz	1892
46	Victor Ruffy	1869
43	Jakob Stämpfli	1863
	Paul Cérésole	1875
	Ulrich Ochsenbein	1854
40	Eugène Borel	1875
39	Ruth Metzler	2004

== Lifespan ==
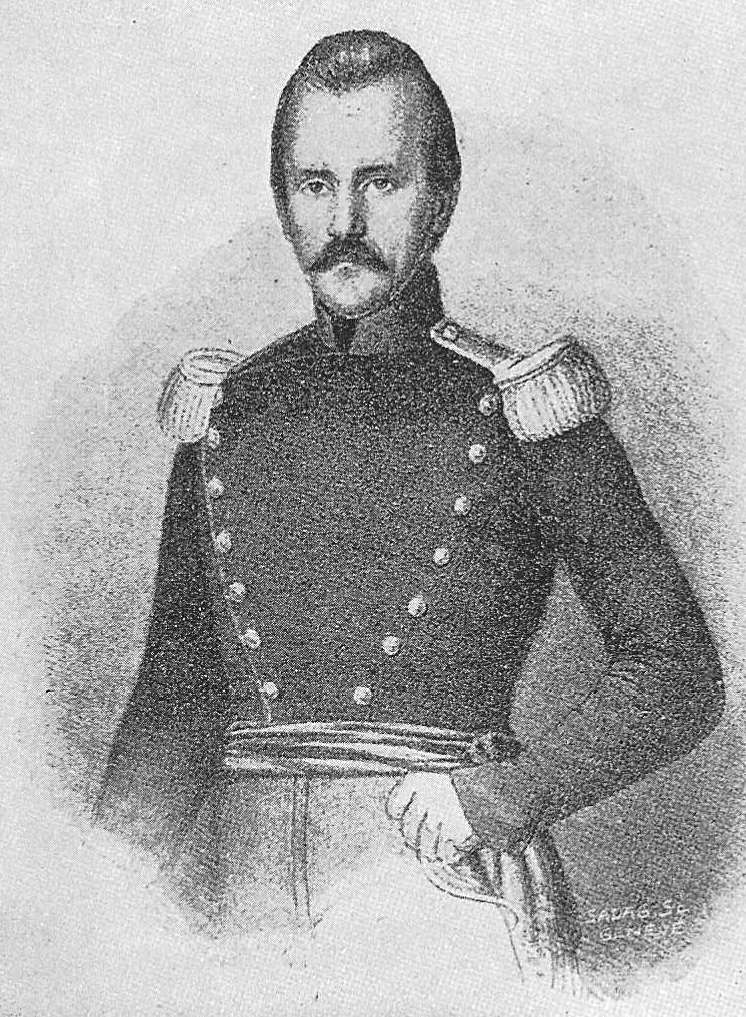
Ochsenbein lived for 36 years after being voted out of office

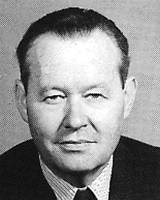
The Oldest: Schaffner died at age 95 in 2004

Years alive after resigning from office
Years	Name	Died
36	Ulrich Ochsenbein	1890
35	Hans Schaffner	2004
34	Elisabeth Kopp	2023
33	Max Petitpierre	1994
32	Constant Fornerod	1899
	Felix-Louis Calonder	1952
30	Enrico Celio	1980
	Paul Cérésole	1905
29	Hans-Peter Tschudi	2002
	Alphons Egli	2016

Longest living members of the Swiss Federal Council
Age	Name	Died
95	Hans Schaffner	2004
	Max Petitpierre	1994
94	Pierre Graber	2003
91	Alphons Egli	2016
90	Enrico Celio	1980
	Rudolf Friedrich	2013
	Arnold Koller	Living
88	Felix-Louis Calonder	1952
	Hans-Peter Tschudi	2002
	Willy Spühler	1990
	Pierre Aubert	2016
