= List of presidents of the Swiss Confederation =

Below is a list of presidents of the Swiss Confederation from 1848 to the present. It presents the presiding member of the Swiss Federal Council, the country's seven-member executive.

Elected by the Federal Assembly for a one-year term, the President of the Confederation chairs the meetings of the Federal Council and undertakes special representational duties. Primus inter pares, the officeholder has no powers above those of the other Federal Councillors and continues to head their department. Traditionally, the duty rotates among the members in order of seniority and the previous year's vice president becomes president.

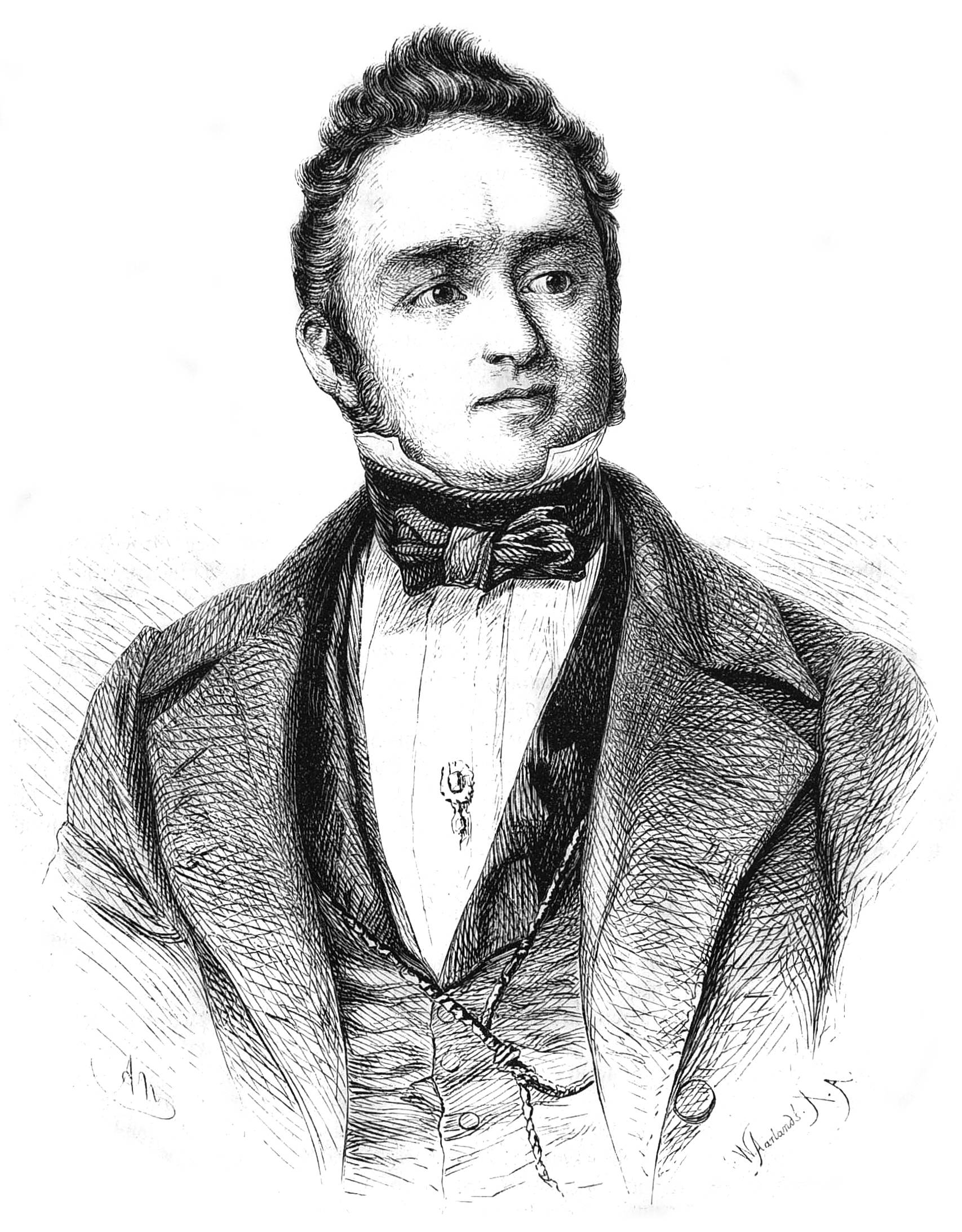
Jonas Furrer served as the first president of the Swiss Confederation (1848–1849).

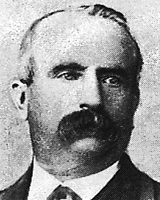
Jakob Stämpfli, who presided over the Federal Council in 1856, was just 35 years old, the youngest to date.

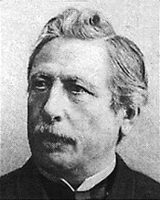
Karl Schenk, as the longest-serving member of the Federal Council, was president of the Confederation six times, a number only equaled by Emil Welti.

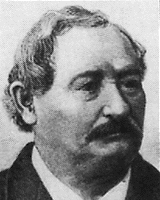
Wilhelm Hertenstein died during his term, on 27 November 1888. As of 2026, he is the only president not to complete his term.

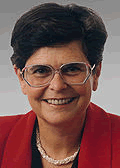
Ruth Dreifuss, who presided over the Federal Council in 1999, was the first woman to serve as president.

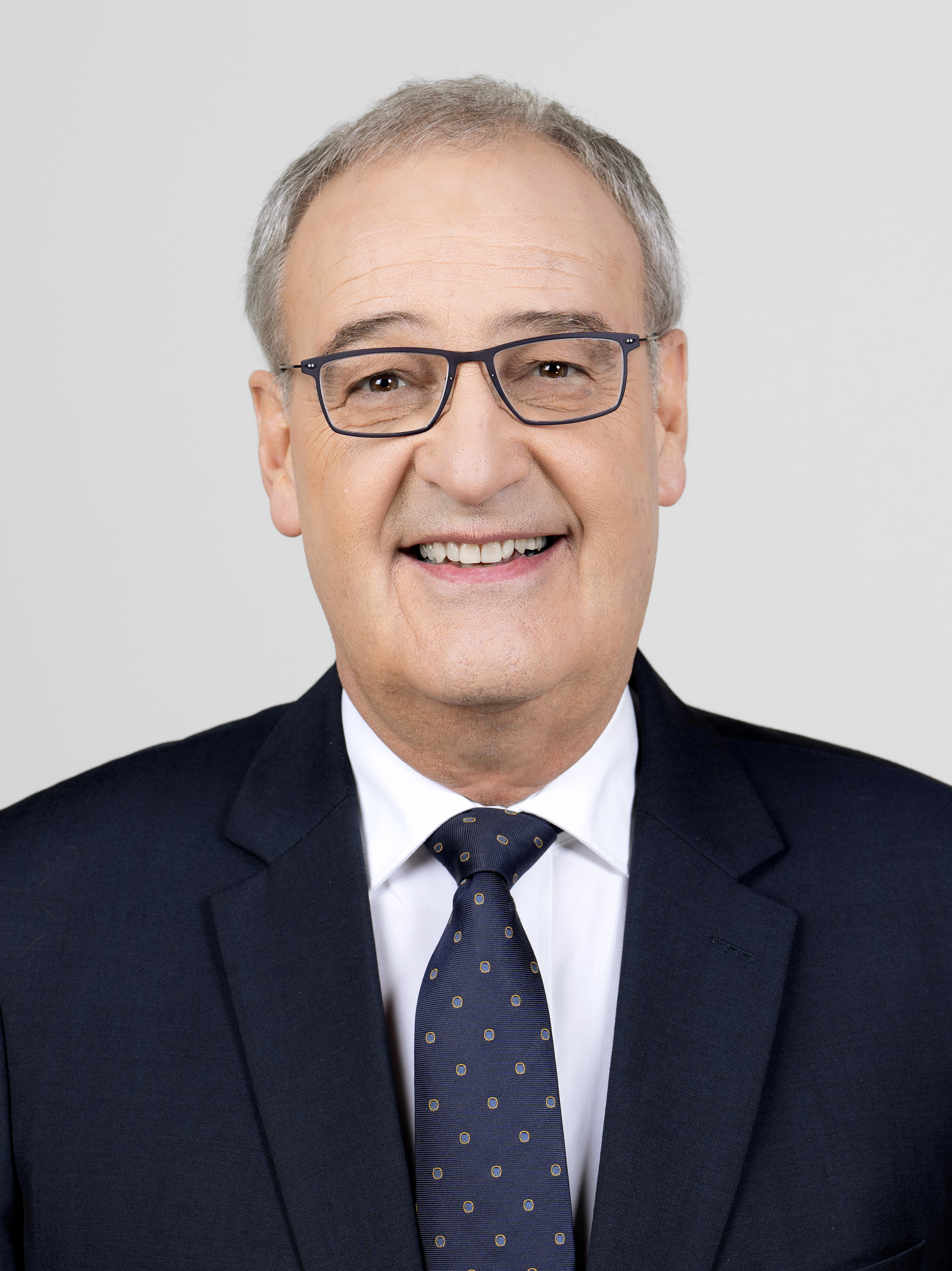
Guy Parmelin, 178th and current president of the Confederation.

== 1848–1899 ==
Free Democratic Party Christian Democratic People's Party

No.	Portrait	Name (Birth–Death)	Term of office		Political party	Canton
1		Jonas Furrer (1805–1861)	21 November 1848	31 December 1849	Free Democratic Party	Zürich
2		Henri Druey (1799–1855)	1 January 1850	31 December 1850	Free Democratic Party	Vaud
3		Josef Munzinger (1791–1855)	1 January 1851	31 December 1851	Free Democratic Party	Solothurn
4		Jonas Furrer (1805–1861)	1 January 1852	31 December 1852	Free Democratic Party	Zürich
5		Wilhelm Matthias Naeff (1802–1881)	1 January 1853	31 December 1853	Free Democratic Party	St. Gallen
6		Friedrich Frey-Herosé (1801–1873)	1 January 1854	31 December 1854	Free Democratic Party	Aargau
7		Jonas Furrer (1805–1861)	1 January 1855	31 December 1855	Free Democratic Party	Zürich
8		Jakob Stämpfli (1820–1879)	1 January 1856	31 December 1856	Free Democratic Party	Bern
9		Constant Fornerod (1819–1899)	1 January 1857	31 December 1857	Free Democratic Party	Vaud
10		Jonas Furrer (1805–1861)	1 January 1858	31 December 1858	Free Democratic Party	Zürich
11		Jakob Stämpfli (1820–1879)	1 January 1859	31 December 1859	Free Democratic Party	Bern
12		Friedrich Frey-Herosé (1801–1873)	1 January 1860	31 December 1860	Free Democratic Party	Aargau
13		Melchior Josef Martin Knüsel (1813–1889)	1 January 1861	31 December 1861	Free Democratic Party	Lucerne
14		Jakob Stämpfli (1820–1879)	1 January 1862	31 December 1862	Free Democratic Party	Bern
15		Constant Fornerod (1819–1899)	1 January 1863	31 December 1863	Free Democratic Party	Vaud
16		Jakob Dubs (1822–1879)	1 January 1864	31 December 1864	Free Democratic Party	Zürich
17		Karl Schenk (1823–1895)	1 January 1865	31 December 1865	Free Democratic Party	Bern
18		Melchior Josef Martin Knüsel (1813–1889)	1 January 1866	31 December 1866	Free Democratic Party	Lucerne
19		Constant Fornerod (1819–1899)	1 January 1867	31 December 1867	Free Democratic Party	Vaud
20		Jakob Dubs (1822–1879)	1 January 1868	31 December 1868	Free Democratic Party	Zürich
21		Emil Welti (1825–1899)	1 January 1869	31 December 1869	Free Democratic Party	Aargau
22		Jakob Dubs (1822–1879)	1 January 1870	31 December 1870	Free Democratic Party	Zürich
23		Karl Schenk (1823–1895)	1 January 1871	31 December 1871	Free Democratic Party	Bern
24		Emil Welti (1825–1899)	1 January 1872	31 December 1872	Free Democratic Party	Aargau
25		Paul Cérésole (1832–1905)	1 January 1873	31 December 1873	Free Democratic Party	Vaud
26		Karl Schenk (1823–1895)	1 January 1874	31 December 1874	Free Democratic Party	Bern
27		Johann Jakob Scherer (1825–1878)	1 January 1875	31 December 1875	Free Democratic Party	Zürich
28		Emil Welti (1825–1899)	1 January 1876	31 December 1876	Free Democratic Party	Aargau
29		Joachim Heer (1825–1879)	1 January 1877	31 December 1877	Free Democratic Party	Glarus
30		Karl Schenk (1823–1895)	1 January 1878	31 December 1878	Free Democratic Party	Bern
31		Bernhard Hammer (1822–1907)	1 January 1879	31 December 1879	Free Democratic Party	Solothurn
32		Emil Welti (1825–1899)	1 January 1880	31 December 1880	Free Democratic Party	Aargau
33		Numa Droz (1844–1899)	1 January 1881	31 December 1881	Free Democratic Party	Neuchâtel
34		Simeon Bavier (1825–1896)	1 January 1882	31 December 1882	Free Democratic Party	Grisons
35		Louis Ruchonnet (1834–1893)	1 January 1883	31 December 1883	Free Democratic Party	Vaud
36		Emil Welti (1825–1899)	1 January 1884	31 December 1884	Free Democratic Party	Aargau
37		Karl Schenk (1823–1895)	1 January 1885	31 December 1885	Free Democratic Party	Bern
38		Adolf Deucher (1831–1912)	1 January 1886	31 December 1886	Free Democratic Party	Thurgau
39		Numa Droz (1844–1899)	1 January 1887	31 December 1887	Free Democratic Party	Neuchâtel
40		Wilhelm Hertenstein (1825–1888)	1 January 1888	27 November 1888	Free Democratic Party	Zürich
41		Bernhard Hammer (1822–1907)	27 November 1888	31 December 1889	Free Democratic Party	Solothurn
42		Louis Ruchonnet (1834–1893)	1 January 1890	31 December 1890	Free Democratic Party	Vaud
43		Emil Welti (1825–1899)	1 January 1891	31 December 1891	Free Democratic Party	Aargau
44		Walter Hauser (1837–1902)	1 January 1892	31 December 1892	Free Democratic Party	Zürich
45		Karl Schenk (1823–1895)	1 January 1893	31 December 1893	Free Democratic Party	Bern
46		Emil Frey (1838–1922)	1 January 1894	31 December 1894	Free Democratic Party	Basel-Landschaft
47		Josef Zemp (1834–1908)	1 January 1895	31 December 1895	Catholic-Conservative Party	Lucerne
48		Adrien Lachenal (1849–1918)	1 January 1896	31 December 1896	Free Democratic Party	Geneva
49		Adolf Deucher (1831–1912)	1 January 1897	31 December 1897	Free Democratic Party	Thurgau
50		Eugène Ruffy (1854–1919)	1 January 1898	31 December 1898	Free Democratic Party	Vaud
51		Eduard Müller (1848–1919)	1 January 1899	31 December 1899	Free Democratic Party	Bern

== 1900–1999 ==
Free Democratic Party
Christian Democratic People's Party
Liberal Party
Party of Farmers, Traders and Independents
Social Democratic Party
Swiss People's Party

No.	Portrait	Name (Birth–Death)	Term of office		Political party	Canton
52		Walter Hauser (1837–1902)	1 January 1900	31 December 1900	Free Democratic Party	Zürich
53		Ernst Brenner (1856–1911)	1 January 1901	31 December 1901	Free Democratic Party	Basel-Stadt
54		Josef Zemp (1834–1908)	1 January 1902	31 December 1902	Catholic-Conservative Party	Lucerne
55		Adolf Deucher (1831–1912)	1 January 1903	31 December 1903	Free Democratic Party	Thurgau
56		Robert Comtesse (1847–1922)	1 January 1904	31 December 1904	Free Democratic Party	Neuchâtel
57		Marc-Émile Ruchet (1853–1912)	1 January 1905	31 December 1905	Free Democratic Party	Vaud
58		Ludwig Forrer (1845–1921)	1 January 1906	31 December 1906	Free Democratic Party	Zürich
59		Eduard Müller (1848–1919)	1 January 1907	31 December 1907	Free Democratic Party	Bern
60		Ernst Brenner (1856–1911)	1 January 1908	31 December 1908	Free Democratic Party	Basel-Stadt
61		Adolf Deucher (1831–1912)	1 January 1909	31 December 1909	Free Democratic Party	Thurgau
62		Robert Comtesse (1847–1922)	1 January 1910	31 December 1910	Free Democratic Party	Neuchâtel
63		Marc-Émile Ruchet (1853–1912)	1 January 1911	31 December 1911	Free Democratic Party	Vaud
64		Ludwig Forrer (1845–1921)	1 January 1912	31 December 1912	Free Democratic Party	Zürich
65		Eduard Müller (1848–1919)	1 January 1913	31 December 1913	Free Democratic Party	Bern
66		Arthur Hoffmann (1857–1927)	1 January 1914	31 December 1914	Free Democratic Party	St. Gallen
67		Giuseppe Motta (1871–1940)	1 January 1915	31 December 1915	Catholic-Conservative Party	Ticino
68		Camille Decoppet (1862–1925)	1 January 1916	31 December 1916	Free Democratic Party	Vaud
69		Edmund Schulthess (1868–1944)	1 January 1917	31 December 1917	Free Democratic Party	Aargau
70		Felix Calonder (1863–1952)	1 January 1918	31 December 1918	Free Democratic Party	Grisons
71		Gustave Ador (1845–1928)	1 January 1919	31 December 1919	Liberal Party	Geneva
72		Giuseppe Motta (1871–1940)	1 January 1920	31 December 1920	Catholic-Conservative Party	Ticino
73		Edmund Schulthess (1868–1944)	1 January 1921	31 December 1921	Free Democratic Party	Aargau
74		Robert Haab (1865–1939)	1 January 1922	31 December 1922	Free Democratic Party	Zürich
75		Karl Scheurer (1872–1929)	1 January 1923	31 December 1923	Free Democratic Party	Bern
76		Ernest Chuard (1857–1942)	1 January 1924	31 December 1924	Free Democratic Party	Vaud
77		Jean-Marie Musy (1876–1952)	1 January 1925	31 December 1925	Catholic-Conservative Party	Fribourg
78		Heinrich Häberlin (1868–1947)	1 January 1926	31 December 1926	Free Democratic Party	Thurgau
79		Giuseppe Motta (1871–1940)	1 January 1927	31 December 1927	Catholic-Conservative Party	Ticino
80		Edmund Schulthess (1868–1944)	1 January 1928	31 December 1928	Free Democratic Party	Aargau
81		Robert Haab (1865–1939)	1 January 1929	31 December 1929	Free Democratic Party	Zürich
82		Jean-Marie Musy (1876–1952)	1 January 1930	31 December 1930	Catholic-Conservative Party	Fribourg
83		Heinrich Häberlin (1868–1947)	1 January 1931	31 December 1931	Free Democratic Party	Thurgau
84		Giuseppe Motta (1871–1940)	1 January 1932	31 December 1932	Catholic-Conservative Party	Ticino
85		Edmund Schulthess (1868–1944)	1 January 1933	31 December 1933	Free Democratic Party	Aargau
86		Marcel Pilet-Golaz (1889–1958)	1 January 1934	31 December 1934	Free Democratic Party	Vaud
87		Rudolf Minger (1881–1955)	1 January 1935	31 December 1935	Party of Farmers, Traders and Independents	Bern
88		Albert Meyer (1870–1953)	1 January 1936	31 December 1936	Free Democratic Party	Zürich
89		Giuseppe Motta (1871–1940)	1 January 1937	31 December 1937	Catholic-Conservative Party	Ticino
90		Johannes Baumann (1874–1953)	1 January 1938	31 December 1938	Free Democratic Party	Appenzell Ausserrhoden
91		Philipp Etter (1891–1977)	1 January 1939	31 December 1939	Catholic-Conservative Party	Zug
92		Marcel Pilet-Golaz (1889–1958)	1 January 1940	31 December 1940	Free Democratic Party	Vaud
93		Ernst Wetter (1877–1963)	1 January 1941	31 December 1941	Free Democratic Party	Zürich
94		Philipp Etter (1891–1977)	1 January 1942	31 December 1942	Catholic-Conservative Party	Zug
95		Enrico Celio (1889–1980)	1 January 1943	31 December 1943	Catholic-Conservative Party	Ticino
96		Walther Stampfli (1884–1965)	1 January 1944	31 December 1944	Free Democratic Party	Solothurn
97		Eduard von Steiger (1881–1962)	1 January 1945	31 December 1945	Party of Farmers, Traders and Independents	Bern
98		Karl Kobelt (1891–1968)	1 January 1946	31 December 1946	Free Democratic Party	St. Gallen
99		Philipp Etter (1891–1977)	1 January 1947	31 December 1947	Catholic-Conservative Party	Zug
100		Enrico Celio (1889–1980)	1 January 1948	31 December 1948	Catholic-Conservative Party	Ticino
101		Ernst Nobs (1886–1957)	1 January 1949	31 December 1949	Social Democratic Party	Zürich
102		Max Petitpierre (1899–1994)	1 January 1950	31 December 1950	Free Democratic Party	Neuchâtel
103		Eduard von Steiger (1881–1962)	1 January 1951	31 December 1951	Party of Farmers, Traders and Independents	Bern
104		Karl Kobelt (1891–1968)	1 January 1952	31 December 1952	Free Democratic Party	St. Gallen
105		Philipp Etter (1891–1977)	1 January 1953	31 December 1953	Catholic-Conservative Party	Zug
106		Rodolphe Rubattel (1896–1961)	1 January 1954	31 December 1954	Free Democratic Party	Vaud
107		Max Petitpierre (1899–1994)	1 January 1955	31 December 1955	Free Democratic Party	Neuchâtel
108		Markus Feldmann (1897–1958)	1 January 1956	31 December 1956	Party of Farmers, Traders and Independents	Bern
109		Hans Streuli (1892–1970)	1 January 1957	31 December 1957	Free Democratic Party	Zürich
110		Thomas Holenstein (1896–1962)	1 January 1958	31 December 1958	Conservative-Christian-Social People's Party	St. Gallen
111		Paul Chaudet (1904–1977)	1 January 1959	31 December 1959	Free Democratic Party	Vaud
112		Max Petitpierre (1899–1994)	1 January 1960	31 December 1960	Free Democratic Party	Neuchâtel
113		Friedrich Traugott Wahlen (1899–1985)	1 January 1961	31 December 1961	Party of Farmers, Traders and Independents	Zürich
114		Paul Chaudet (1904–1977)	1 January 1962	31 December 1962	Free Democratic Party	Vaud
115		Willy Spühler (1902–1990)	1 January 1963	31 December 1963	Social Democratic Party	Zürich
116		Ludwig von Moos (1910–1990)	1 January 1964	31 December 1964	Conservative-Christian-Social People's Party	Obwalden
117		Hans-Peter Tschudi (1913–2002)	1 January 1965	31 December 1965	Social Democratic Party	Basel-Stadt
118		Hans Schaffner (1908–2004)	1 January 1966	31 December 1966	Free Democratic Party	Aargau
119		Roger Bonvin (1907–1982)	1 January 1967	31 December 1967	Conservative-Christian-Social People's Party	Valais
120		Willy Spühler (1902–1990)	1 January 1968	31 December 1968	Social Democratic Party	Zürich
121		Ludwig von Moos (1910–1990)	1 January 1969	31 December 1969	Conservative-Christian-Social People's Party	Obwalden
122		Hans-Peter Tschudi (1913–2002)	1 January 1970	31 December 1970	Social Democratic Party	Basel-Stadt
123		Rudolf Gnägi (1917–1985)	1 January 1971	31 December 1971	Swiss People's Party	Bern
124		Nello Celio (1914–1995)	1 January 1972	31 December 1972	Free Democratic Party	Ticino
125		Roger Bonvin (1907–1982)	1 January 1973	31 December 1973	Christian Democratic People's Party	Valais
126		Ernst Brugger (1914–1998)	1 January 1974	31 December 1974	Free Democratic Party	Zürich
127		Pierre Graber (1908–2003)	1 January 1975	31 December 1975	Social Democratic Party	Vaud
128		Rudolf Gnägi (1917–1985)	1 January 1976	31 December 1976	Swiss People's Party	Bern
129		Kurt Furgler (1924–2008)	1 January 1977	31 December 1977	Christian Democratic People's Party	St. Gallen
130		Willi Ritschard (1918–1983)	1 January 1978	31 December 1978	Social Democratic Party	Solothurn
131		Hans Hürlimann (1918–1994)	1 January 1979	31 December 1979	Christian Democratic People's Party	Zug
132		Georges-André Chevallaz (1915–2002)	1 January 1980	31 December 1980	Free Democratic Party	Vaud
133		Kurt Furgler (1924–2008)	1 January 1981	31 December 1981	Christian Democratic People's Party	St. Gallen
134		Fritz Honegger (1917–1999)	1 January 1982	31 December 1982	Free Democratic Party	Zürich
135		Pierre Aubert (1927–2016)	1 January 1983	31 December 1983	Social Democratic Party	Neuchâtel
136		Leon Schlumpf (1925–2012)	1 January 1984	31 December 1984	Swiss People's Party	Grisons
137		Kurt Furgler (1924–2008)	1 January 1985	31 December 1985	Christian Democratic People's Party	St. Gallen
138		Alphons Egli (1924–2016)	1 January 1986	31 December 1986	Christian Democratic People's Party	Lucern
139		Pierre Aubert (1927–2016)	1 January 1987	31 December 1987	Social Democratic Party	Neuchâtel
140		Otto Stich (1927–2012)	1 January 1988	31 December 1988	Social Democratic Party	Solothurn
141		Jean-Pascal Delamuraz (1936–1998)	1 January 1989	31 December 1989	Free Democratic Party	Vaud
142		Arnold Koller (born 1933)	1 January 1990	31 December 1990	Christian Democratic People's Party	Appenzell Innerrhoden
143		Flavio Cotti (1939–2020)	1 January 1991	31 December 1991	Christian Democratic People's Party	Ticino
144		René Felber (1933–2020)	1 January 1992	31 December 1992	Social Democratic Party	Neuchâtel
145		Adolf Ogi (born 1942)	1 January 1993	31 December 1993	Swiss People's Party	Bern
146		Otto Stich (1927–2012)	1 January 1994	31 December 1994	Social Democratic Party	Solothurn
147		Kaspar Villiger (born 1941)	1 January 1995	31 December 1995	Free Democratic Party	Lucerne
148		Jean-Pascal Delamuraz (1936–1998)	1 January 1996	31 December 1996	Free Democratic Party	Vaud
149		Arnold Koller (born 1933)	1 January 1997	31 December 1997	Christian Democratic People's Party	Appenzell Innerrhoden
150		Flavio Cotti (1939–2020)	1 January 1998	31 December 1998	Christian Democratic People's Party	Ticino
151		Ruth Dreifuss (born 1940)	1 January 1999	31 December 1999	Social Democratic Party	Geneva

== 2000–present ==
Political parties

Swiss People's Party
Social Democratic Party
Free Democratic Party/FDP.The Liberals
Christian Democratic People's Party/The Centre
Conservative Democratic Party

No.	Portrait	Name (Birth–Death)	Term of office		Political party	Canton
152		Adolf Ogi (born 1942)	1 January 2000	31 December 2000	Swiss People's Party	Bern
153		Moritz Leuenberger (born 1946)	1 January 2001	31 December 2001	Social Democratic Party	Zürich
154		Kaspar Villiger (born 1941)	1 January 2002	31 December 2002	Free Democratic Party	Lucerne
155		Pascal Couchepin (born 1942)	1 January 2003	31 December 2003	Free Democratic Party	Valais
156		Joseph Deiss (born 1946)	1 January 2004	31 December 2004	Christian Democratic People's Party	Fribourg
157		Samuel Schmid (born 1947)	1 January 2005	31 December 2005	Swiss People's Party	Bern
158		Moritz Leuenberger (born 1946)	1 January 2006	31 December 2006	Social Democratic Party	Zürich
159		Micheline Calmy-Rey (born 1945)	1 January 2007	31 December 2007	Social Democratic Party	Geneva
160		Pascal Couchepin (born 1942)	1 January 2008	31 December 2008	Free Democratic Party	Valais
161		Hans-Rudolf Merz (born 1942)	1 January 2009	31 December 2009	FDP.The Liberals	Appenzell Ausserrhoden
162		Doris Leuthard (born 1963)	1 January 2010	31 December 2010	Christian Democratic People's Party	Aargau
163		Micheline Calmy-Rey (born 1945)	1 January 2011	31 December 2011	Social Democratic Party	Geneva
164		Eveline Widmer-Schlumpf (born 1956)	1 January 2012	31 December 2012	Conservative Democratic Party	Grisons
165		Ueli Maurer (born 1950)	1 January 2013	31 December 2013	Swiss People's Party	Zürich
166		Didier Burkhalter (born 1960)	1 January 2014	31 December 2014	FDP.The Liberals	Neuchâtel
167		Simonetta Sommaruga (born 1960)	1 January 2015	31 December 2015	Social Democratic Party	Bern
168		Johann Schneider-Ammann (born 1952)	1 January 2016	31 December 2016	FDP.The Liberals	Bern
169		Doris Leuthard (born 1963)	1 January 2017	31 December 2017	Christian Democratic People's Party	Aargau
170		Alain Berset (born 1972)	1 January 2018	31 December 2018	Social Democratic Party	Fribourg
171		Ueli Maurer (born 1950)	1 January 2019	31 December 2019	Swiss People's Party	Zürich
172		Simonetta Sommaruga (born 1960)	1 January 2020	31 December 2020	Social Democratic Party	Bern
173		Guy Parmelin (born 1959)	1 January 2021	31 December 2021	Swiss People's Party	Vaud
174		Ignazio Cassis (born 1961)	1 January 2022	31 December 2022	FDP.The Liberals	Ticino
175		Alain Berset (born 1972)	1 January 2023	31 December 2023	Social Democratic Party	Fribourg
176		Viola Amherd (born 1962)	1 January 2024	31 December 2024	The Centre	Valais
177		Karin Keller-Sutter (born 1963)	1 January 2025	31 December 2025	FDP.The Liberals	St. Gallen
178		Guy Parmelin (born 1959)	1 January 2026	Incumbent	Swiss People's Party	Vaud

== See also ==
- Presidents of the Swiss Diet (before 1848)
- Chancellor of Switzerland
