= 1959 in Switzerland =

- Decades: 1930s; 1940s; 1950s; 1960s; 1970s
- See also: History of Switzerland; Timeline of Swiss history; List of years in Switzerland

Events during the year 1959 in Switzerland.

== Incumbents ==
- Federal Council:
  - Paul Chaudet (president)
  - Philipp Etter (until December)
  - Max Petitpierre
  - Hans Streuli (until December)
  - Giuseppe Lepori (until December)
  - Thomas Holenstein (until December)
  - Friedrich Traugott Wahlen
  - Ludwig von Moos (from December)
  - Hans-Peter Tschudi (from December)
  - Willy Spühler (from December)
  - Jean Bourgknecht (from December)

== Events ==
- 1 February – A referendum takes place rejecting suffrage rights for women in Federal elections.
- 26–27 July – The 1959 ICF Canoe Slalom World Championships take place in Geneva.
- The 1959 European Figure Skating Championships take place in Davos.

== Births ==
- 28 April – Erhard Loretan, mountain climber (died 2011)
- 9 November – Guy Parmelin, politician
