= 1954 in Switzerland =

- Decades: 1930s; 1940s; 1950s; 1960s; 1970s
- See also: History of Switzerland; Timeline of Swiss history; List of years in Switzerland

Events during the year 1954 in Switzerland.

== Incumbents ==
- Federal Council:
  - Rodolphe Rubattel (president, until December)
  - Max Petitpierre
  - Philipp Etter
  - Karl Kobelt (until December)
  - Max Weber (until January)
  - Josef Escher (until December)
  - Markus Feldmann
  - Hans Streuli
  - Paul Chaudet (from December)
  - Thomas Holenstein (from December)
  - Giuseppe Lepori (from December)

== Events ==
- 25–29 August – The 1954 European Athletics Championships take place in Bern.
- 29 September – CERN, the European Organization for Nuclear Research, is founded in Geneva.

== Births ==
- 8 March – Marie-Theres Nadig, alpine skeir

== Deaths ==
- 9 December – Josef Escher, politician (born 1885)
