= 1961 in Switzerland =

- Decades: 1940s; 1950s; 1960s; 1970s; 1980s
- See also: History of Switzerland; Timeline of Swiss history; List of years in Switzerland

Events during the year 1961 in Switzerland.

== Incumbents ==
- Federal Council:
  - Friedrich Traugott Wahlen (president)
  - Hans-Peter Tschudi
  - Willy Spühler
  - Paul Chaudet
  - Ludwig von Moos
  - Max Petitpierre (until June), then Hans Schaffner
  - Jean Bourgknecht

== Births ==
- 22 February – Rolf Thorsen, Norwegian rower
- 13 April – Ignazio Cassis, politician

== Deaths ==
- 6 June – Carl Jung, psychiatrist (born 1875)
- 18 October – Rodolphe Rubattel, politician (born 1896)
