= 1958 in Switzerland =

- Decades: 1930s; 1940s; 1950s; 1960s; 1970s
- See also: History of Switzerland; Timeline of Swiss history; List of years in Switzerland

Events during the year 1958 in Switzerland.

== Incumbents ==
- Federal Council:
  - Thomas Holenstein (president)
  - Paul Chaudet
  - Philipp Etter
  - Max Petitpierre
  - Hans Streuli
  - Giuseppe Lepori
  - Markus Feldmann (until November), then Friedrich Traugott Wahlen (from December)

== Events ==
- 12 July – The Swiss government announces its intention to acquire or create nuclear weapons.
- The second Swiss Exhibition for Women's Work takes place in Zürich.

== Deaths ==
- 11 April – Marcel Pilet-Golaz, politician (died 1889)
- 3 November – Markus Feldmann, politician (born 1897)
