= 1960 in Switzerland =

- Decades: 1940s; 1950s; 1960s; 1970s; 1980s
- See also: History of Switzerland; Timeline of Swiss history; List of years in Switzerland

Events during the year 1960 in Switzerland.

== Incumbents ==
- Federal Council:
  - Max Petitpierre (president)
  - Friedrich Traugott Wahlen
  - Ludwig von Moos
  - Hans-Peter Tschudi
  - Willy Spühler
  - Jean Bourgknecht
  - Paul Chaudet

== Births ==
- 29 January – Annemarie Bischofberger, alpine skier
- 17 April – Didier Burkhalter, politician
- 14 May – Simonetta Sommaruga, politician
- 17 December – Philippe Chevrier, chef

== Deaths ==
- 24 January – Edwin Fischer, pianist and conductor (born 1886)
- 7 April – Henri Guisan, military leader (born 1874)
