= 1962 in Switzerland =

- Decades: 1940s; 1950s; 1960s; 1970s; 1980s
- See also: History of Switzerland; Timeline of Swiss history; List of years in Switzerland

Events during the year 1962 in Switzerland.

== Incumbents ==
- Federal Council:
  - Paul Chaudet (president)
  - Hans-Peter Tschudi
  - Willy Spühler
  - Friedrich Traugott Wahlen
  - Ludwig von Moos
  - Hans Schaffner
  - Jean Bourgknecht (until December), then Roger Bonvin

== Events ==
- 27 February–3 March – The 1962 European Figure Skating Championships take place in Geneva.

== Births ==
- 6 March – Erika Hess, alpine skier
- 7 June – Viola Amherd, politician
- 10 June – Brigitte Oertli, alpine skier
- 28 July – Corinne Schneider, athlete
- 11 December – Denise Biellmann, figure skater

== Deaths ==
- 10 February – Eduard von Steiger, politician (born 1881)
- 24 August – Louis Moilliet, painter (born 1880)
- 31 October – Thomas Holenstein, politician (born 1896)
