= 1955 in Switzerland =

- Decades: 1930s; 1940s; 1950s; 1960s; 1970s
- See also: History of Switzerland; Timeline of Swiss history; List of years in Switzerland

Events during the year 1955 in Switzerland.

== Incumbents ==
- Federal Council:
  - Max Petitpierre (president)
  - Philipp Etter
  - Markus Feldmann
  - Paul Chaudet
  - Thomas Holenstein
  - Giuseppe Lepori
  - Hans Streuli

== Events ==
- 14-16 February – Four Romanian émigrés seize the Romanian embassy in Bern and kill a chauffeur in protest of Romania's communist government.

== Births ==
- 24 August – Sylvie Perrinjaquet, politician
- 11 September – Laurence Fehlmann Rielle, politician

== Deaths ==
- 30 June – Félix Bédouret, footballer (born 1897)
- 23 August – Rudolf Minger, politician (born 1881)
