= 1964 in Switzerland =

- Decades: 1940s; 1950s; 1960s; 1970s; 1980s
- See also: History of Switzerland; Timeline of Swiss history; List of years in Switzerland

Events during the year 1964 in Switzerland.

== Incumbents ==
- Federal Council:
  - Ludwig von Moos (president)
  - Willy Spühler
  - Hans-Peter Tschudi
  - Roger Bonvin
  - Paul Chaudet
  - Friedrich Traugott Wahlen
  - Hans Schaffner

== Births ==
- 14 May – Barbara Gysi, politician
- 23 May – Ruth Metzler-Arnold, politician
- 12 July – Beat Jans, politician
- 26 November – Vreni Schneider, skier
- 30 November - Patrik Hoffmann, CEO of Favre Leuba

== Deaths ==
- 23 December – Jean Bourgknecht, politician (born 1902)
