= 1956 in Switzerland =

- Decades: 1930s; 1940s; 1950s; 1960s; 1970s
- See also: History of Switzerland; Timeline of Swiss history; List of years in Switzerland

Events during the year 1956 in Switzerland.

== Incumbents ==
- Federal Council:
  - Markus Feldmann (president)
  - Philipp Etter
  - Paul Chaudet
  - Thomas Holenstein
  - Giuseppe Lepori
  - Max Petitpierre
  - Hans Streuli

== Events ==
- 18 May – Swiss mountaineers Ernst Reiss and Fritz Luchsinger successfully climbed Lhotse, the world's fourth highest mountain, for the first time.
- 24 May – The first Eurovision Song Contest was hosted in Lugano, Switzerland, and saw Lys Assia's win, with the song "Refrain", with music by Géo Voumard and lyrics by Émile Gardaz.

== Births ==
- 16 January – Serge Demierre, Swiss cyclist
- 16 April – Lise-Marie Morerod, Swiss skier

== Deaths ==
- 5 April – Paul Rudolf, Swiss rower.

=== Date unknown ===
- Josef Wilhelm, Swiss gymnast and Olympic Champion (born: 1892)
