= 1952 in Switzerland =

- Decades: 1930s; 1940s; 1950s; 1960s; 1970s
- See also: History of Switzerland; Timeline of Swiss history; List of years in Switzerland

Events during the year 1952 in Switzerland.

== Incumbents ==
- Federal Council:
  - Karl Kobelt (president)
  - Max Petitpierre
  - Philipp Etter
  - Max Weber
  - Josef Escher
  - Markus Feldmann
  - Rodolphe Rubattel

== Births ==
- 18 February – Johann Schneider-Ammann, politician

== Deaths ==
- 6 February – Lucian Büeler, figure skater (born 1910)
- 19 April – Jean-Marie Musy, politician (born 1876)
- 14 June – Felix-Louis Calonder, politician (born 1863)
- 15 June – Jakob Jud, linguist (born 1882)
- 18 December – Charles-Gustave Kuhn, equestrian (born 1889)
