= 1963 in Switzerland =

- Decades: 1940s; 1950s; 1960s; 1970s; 1980s
- See also: History of Switzerland; Timeline of Swiss history; List of years in Switzerland

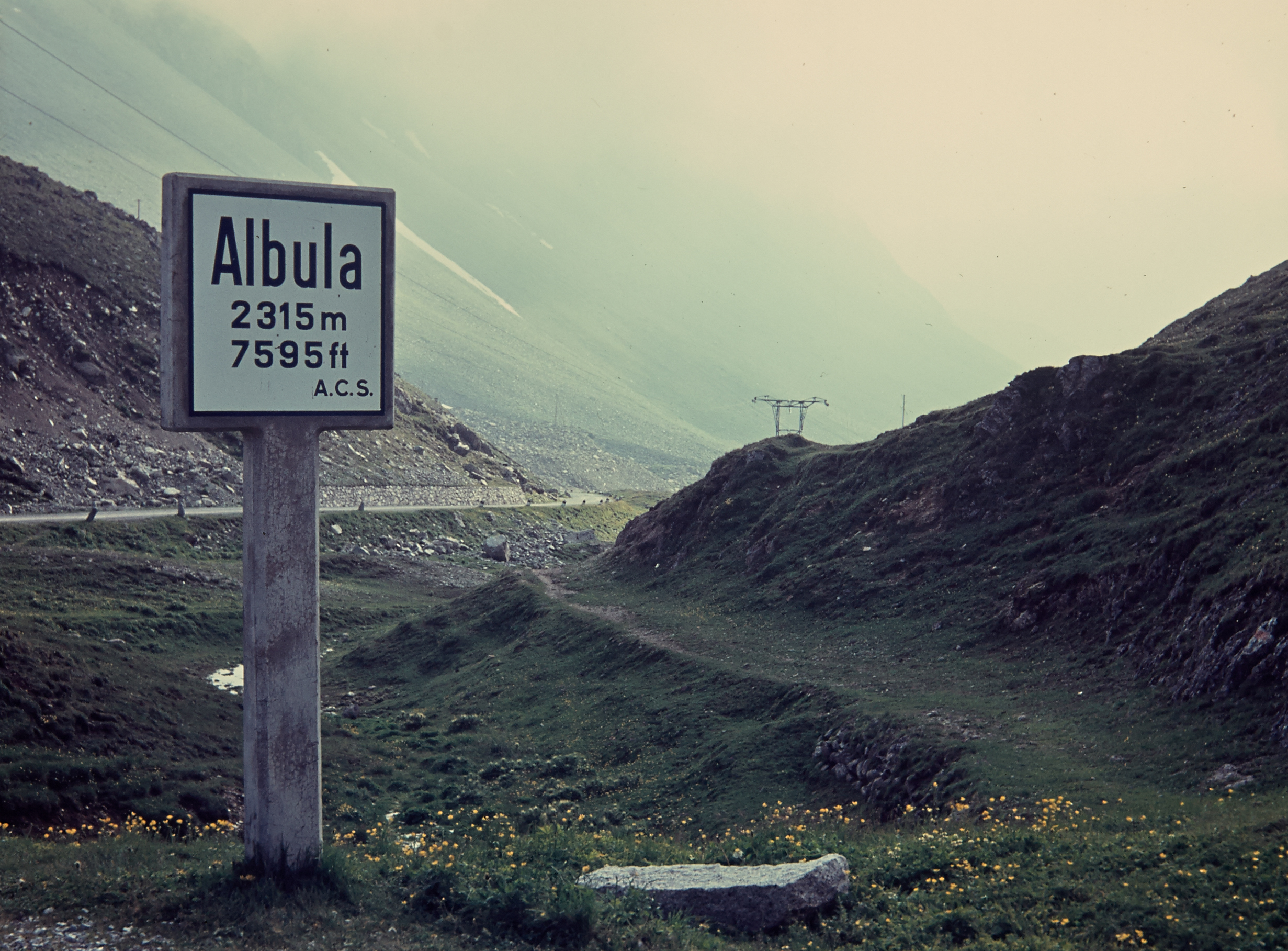
Albula pass, 1963

Events during the year 1963 in Switzerland.

== Incumbents ==
- Federal Council:
  - Willy Spühler (president)
  - Hans-Peter Tschudi
  - Roger Bonvin
  - Paul Chaudet
  - Friedrich Traugott Wahlen
  - Ludwig von Moos
  - Hans Schaffner

== Events ==
- 6 May – Switzerland joins the Council of Europe.

== Births ==
- 4 February – Pirmin Zurbriggen, alpine skier
- 10 April – Doris Leuthard, politician
- 27 May – Maria Walliser, alpine skier
- 31 July – Martin Pfister, historian and politician
- 22 December – Karin Keller-Sutter, politician
- 24 December – Élisabeth Baume-Schneider, politician

== Deaths ==
- 10 August – Ernst Wetter, politician (born 1877)
