= 1966 in Switzerland =

- Decades: 1940s; 1950s; 1960s; 1970s; 1980s
- See also: History of Switzerland; Timeline of Swiss history; List of years in Switzerland

Events during the year 1966 in Switzerland.

== Incumbents ==
- Federal Council:
  - Hans Schaffner (president)
  - Hans-Peter Tschudi
  - Roger Bonvin
  - Paul Chaudet (until December), then Nello Celio
  - Rudolf Gnägi
  - Ludwig von Moos
  - Willy Spühler

== Births ==
- 23 February – Didier Queloz, astronomer
- 7 April – Michela Figini, alpine skier
- 7 July – Ingrid Haralamow, canoeist

== Deaths ==
- 11 January – Alberto Giacometti, sculptor and painter (born 1901)
- 19 April – Albert Servaes, Belgian painter (born 1883 in Belgium)
