= 1965 in Switzerland =

- Decades: 1940s; 1950s; 1960s; 1970s; 1980s
- See also: History of Switzerland; Timeline of Swiss history; List of years in Switzerland

Events during the year 1965 in Switzerland.

== Incumbents ==
- Federal Council:
  - Hans-Peter Tschudi (president)
  - Hans Schaffner
  - Roger Bonvin
  - Paul Chaudet
  - Rudolf Gnägi
  - Ludwig von Moos
  - Willy Spühler

== Births ==
- 4 November – Claudia Strobl, alpine skier
- 13 November – Marie-Thérèse Armentero, swimmer

== Deaths ==
- 11 October – Walther Stampfli, politician (born 1884)
- 13 October – Paul Hermann Müller, chemist (born 1899)
