= 1967 in Switzerland =

- Decades: 1940s; 1950s; 1960s; 1970s; 1980s
- See also: History of Switzerland; Timeline of Swiss history; List of years in Switzerland

Events during the year 1967 in Switzerland.

== Incumbents ==
- Federal Council:
  - Roger Bonvin (president)
  - Willy Spühler
  - Hans Schaffner
  - Hans-Peter Tschudi
  - Rudolf Gnägi
  - Nello Celio
  - Ludwig von Moos

== Births ==
- 16 March – Heidi Zurbriggen, alpine skier
- 25 March – Brigitte McMahon, triathlete
- 20 April – Marco Hangl, alpine skier
- 7 August – Albert Rösti, politician

== Deaths ==
- 14 January – Hans Walter, rower (born 1889)
- 17 January – Louis Blondel, archaeologist (born 1885)
- 25 May – Johannes Itten, painter and teacher (born 1888)
