= 1950 in Switzerland =

- Decades: 1930s; 1940s; 1950s; 1960s; 1970s
- See also: History of Switzerland; Timeline of Swiss history; List of years in Switzerland

Events during the year 1950 in Switzerland.

== Incumbents ==
- Federal Council:
  - Max Petitpierre (president)
  - Philipp Etter
  - Karl Kobelt
  - Enrico Celio (until October)
  - Rodolphe Rubattel
  - Eduard von Steiger
  - Ernst Nobs
  - Josef Escher (from September)

== Events ==
- 14–16 July – The 1950 Artistic Gymnastics World Championships take place in Basel.

== Births ==
- 5 January – Ueli Bächli, bobsledder
- 8 September – Léa Pool, Swiss-Canadian filmmaker
- 27 October – Heidi Robbiani, equestrian
- 31 October – Princess Nora of Liechtenstein
- 1 December – Ueli Maurer, politician

== Deaths ==
- 30 June – Hermann Betschart, rower (born 1910)
