= 1897 in Switzerland =

- Decades: 1870s; 1880s; 1890s; 1900s; 1910s
- See also: History of Switzerland; Timeline of Swiss history; List of years in Switzerland

Events during the year 1897 in Switzerland.

== Incumbents ==
- Federal Council:
  - Adolf Deucher (president)
  - Eduard Müller
  - Joseph Zemp
  - Walter Hauser
  - Emil Frey (until March), then Ernst Brenner
  - Eugene Ruffy
  - Adrien Lachenal

== Births ==
- 21 May – Markus Feldmann, politician (died 1958)
- 27 May – Adolf Portmann, zoologist (died 1982)
- 2 August – Max Weber, politician (died 1974)
- 1 October – Heinrich Gretler, actor (died 1977)
- Félix Bédouret, footballer (died 1955)

== Deaths ==
- 8 August – Jacob Burckhardt, historian of art and culture (born 1818)
