= Swiss reception of Hungarian refugees (1956 to 1959) =

The Swiss reception of Hungarian refugees refers to Switzerland's humanitarian and political response to the tens of thousands of refugees who fled Communist Hungary after the Soviet suppression of the 1956 Revolution there. At approximately 12,000 individuals, Switzerland admitted one of the highest numbers of refugees per capita among Western states and instituted emergency procedures, such as transport, temporary camps and rapid private placement, that would later shape its modern asylum system.

Some historians place Switzerland's liberal refugee policy regarding fleeing Hungarians in a larger context of being particularly open to those fleeing Communist systems during the Cold War as opposed to those fleeing fascism and antisemitism in World War II: After Hungary, the Swiss government would again show openness to Czechoslovaks fleeing the Soviet repression of the Prague Spring and Tibetans fleeing China.

== Background ==
The Soviet invasion of Hungary on 4 November 1956 ended a two-week popular uprising and triggered one of the largest refugee movements of the Cold War: about 180,000 Hungarians crossed into Austria and 20,000 into Yugoslavia. Neutral yet staunchly anti-communist, Switzerland had watched events through the lens of its Cold War alignment with the West. Public sympathy for the plight of the Hungarian people was amplified by radio coverage from Budapest and frequent solidarity rallies in Swiss cities.

Switzerland signed and ratified the 1951 Refugee Convention which required it to admit those fleeing persecution.

== Government response ==
=== Initial policy ===
Within hours of the Soviet attack the Swiss Federal Council relaxed normal visa requirements for a new category of stateless persons and Hungarians in distress by emergency decree (issued on 4 November 1956), followed on 13 November by the imposition of an admission quota of 4,000 refugees. Due to demand, this quota was augmented by an additional quota of 6,000 provisional slots on 23 November 1956. Justice and Police Minister Markus Feldmann coordinated the measures with the cantons, tasking the Swiss Red Cross (SRC) and the Swiss Federal Railways (SBB) with transport and reception responsibilities.

An allocation system took into consideration the labour market situation and the available accommodation. The importance of distributing refugees evenly throughout Switzerland was also emphasised in a circular letter from the Swiss Federal Department of Economic Affairs dated 16 February 1957. Consequently, the refugees did not enjoy unrestricted freedom to choose their canton of residence: No canton was legally required to accept refugees from other cantons. However, the authorities sought to prevent the refugees from concentrating in only a few parts of the country. If there was a compelling reason, for example the pursuit of vocational training or university study, or important family considerations, a request to change ones canton of residence was to be granted.

Hungarian refugees were treated favourably compared to other refugees to Switzerland. Archived internal government memos (produced in late 1956) reveal that the authorities acted this way due to the country's favourable public opinion regarding these refugees. On the 5th of December, 1956 The Swiss Federal Police sent a memo to its cantonal counterparts (who in Switzerland's federal decentralized system have the job of formally approving and issuing residence permits) asking them to accelerate the issuance of these permits. In its request, the Federal Police stated that "The swift issuance of [residence] permits is likely to reinforce among the refugees the feeling that they can gain a permanent foothold in Switzerland." The Department of Economic Affairs sent a memo to the cantonal authorities on 16 February 1957 informing them that free employment agencies had been established for Hungarian refugees. Refugees were allowed to immediately begin any jobs they procured through their use.

However, by 1957 federal government officials reported a negative change in public perception of the refugee policy. Justice and Police Minister Markus Feldmann was paraphrased as stating that

The enthusiasm and fervor born of the event and its brutality have given way to more measured feelings, or even, on both sides, a little weariness and a fair amount of disappointment. Two worlds have suddenly found themselves in contact, and the result is some friction.

— Summary of Feldmann's statements at a government meeting, as stated by newspaper Journal de Genève

In a March 1957 meeting between the Heads of the various Swiss regional police forces, opposition to further expanding the Hungarian refugee program was expressed on behalf of multiple cantonal governments. Some expressed views regarding a lack of work ethic among a small minority of the refugees, which multiple officials present stated negatively impacted the perception of the Hungarian refugee program as a whole.

=== From the end of 1957 onward ===
A new phase in Hungarian refugee policy was ushered in by a memo drafted by the Swiss Justice Department (JPD) on November 7, 1957, in which it was announced that those with one-year provisional residence permits issued in the fall of 1956 would have them extended by the Swiss Federal Police for another year. Those Hungarian refugees who earned an income were considered able to pay taxes. However, the JPD stated that requests by refugees for tax exemptions or reductions would be considered "favourably" (for example, if the refugees in question were partially being taken care of by private individuals or aid organizations). In January 1959, the JPD expressed the wish that the Hungarian refugees join the Swiss unemployment insurance scheme; from August 1959 onward, they were required to do so.

88.3% of Hungarian refugees remained in Switzerland by June 1960 with a large part of the remainder returning to Hungary. The reasons for this small minority returning to a country they just fled were delineated in a study by historian Tiphaine Robert in 2017.

== Student response ==
Following a solidarity rally at the University of Zurich on the 29th of October 1956, students from the University of Zurich and Swiss Federal Institute of Technology in Zürich founded the organization "Student Direct Aid Switzerland-Hungary" (SDSU), chaired by Walter Renschler, later a member of the Swiss National Council for the Social Democratic Party. Other SDSU activists included Elisabeth Kopp, later a Federal Councillor, and Peter Arbenz, who would become a renowned refugee delegate. After initially delivering relief supplies to Hungary and assisting in refugee transports to Switzerland, the SDSU registered and supervised all Hungarian students arriving in Switzerland, on behalf of the federal government from the end of November 1956. 565 of them were offered places at Swiss universities. A "Hungary Scholarship Fund" existed for ten years, into which each enrolling university student had to pay 15 francs.

== Outcomes ==
Integration of the refugees centred on learning one of Switzerland's national languages, often including local Swiss German dialects, and adjusting to perceived Swiss workplace expectations of punctuality and procedural formality. Oral‑history interviews highlight an initial distrust of Swiss state authorities, rooted in memories of Stalinist repression. This gradually eased as refugees navigated the asylum and police systems. Although some individuals struggled with psychological problems, contemporary studies and follow‑up surveys indicate that the majority of the admitted Hungarians leveraged their education into skilled employment, formed durable social networks and achieved upward social mobility.

== Contemporary significance ==
At a non-governmental event organized by Swiss weekly Weltwoche in 2023, Hungarian Prime Minister Viktor Orban thanked Switzerland for its openness in admitting Hungarian refugees.
