= Philippe Chevrier =

Swiss chef

Philippe Chevrier (born 17 December 1960 in Geneva) is a Swiss chef.

== Biography ==
Between 1976 and 1979, he was apprenticed at the restaurant Le Chat Botté in the Hôtel Beau Rivage in Geneva. His studies completed, he worked for two years as a commis chef at L'Oasis restaurant in La Napoule and at Le Gentilhomme in the Hôtel Richemond before undertaking two one-year training periods in bakery and confectionery between 1982 and 1983.

In 1984, he spent the year as a chef with Frédy Girardet in Crissier before joining Le Patio restaurant where he was sous-chef de cuisine from 1985 to 1986. In 1987, he was employed as chef de cuisine at Domaine de Châteauvieux in Satigny, of which he became proprietor in 1989.

He obtained his first Michelin star in 1991, his second in 1994. He was made a Chevalier de l'ordre du Mérite agricole in 1996 and opened the Café de Peney, also in Satigny, in 1998. In 2002, he was scored 19/20 in Gault Millau and voted Chef of the Year.

In 2003, he took over the restaurant Le Vallon in Conches, in the outskirts of Geneva, and opened the Epicerie de Châteauvieux in Satigny. In 2004, he opened Domaine de Chouilly, still in the same commune. In 2005, he launched a range of products for retail and, in 2006, a range of wines (called Les Vins Philippe Chevrier) in co-operation with the Geneva winegrowers and prepared by Nicolas Bonnet and the Cave de Genève. The same year, he began gastronomic cruises on Lake Geneva aboard the steam boat Savoie in association with the Compagnie Générale de Navigation sur le lac Léman.

== His establishments ==
- Domaine de Châteauvieux: gastronomic restaurant in Satigny.
- Café de Peney : café restaurant in Peney-Dessous, 14/20 in Gault Millau
- Restaurant le Vallon : restaurant in Conches, 15/20 in Gault Millau
- Épicerie du Domaine de Châteauvieux : delicatessen of fine products
- Domaine de Choully : location of Philippe Chevrier Le Traiteur SA, Domaine de Châteauvieux in Chouilly
- Bateau Le Savoie : gastronomic cruises on que sur le Lake Geneva in a 1914 steam boat
- Restaurant le Relais de Chambésy in the village of Chambésy (GE)

== Publications ==
- Philippe Chevrier; Jean Lamotte; Bertola; Thomas Hensinger (2004). Histoires gourmandes (in French). Jouvence. ISBN 978-2883534056.
- Philippe Chevrier; Jean Lamotte; Jean-Claude Tabernier (2009). Délices d'automne et d'hiver : Recettes de Damien Coche et son équipe (in French). Éditions Slatkine. ISBN 978-2832103647.

== Notes ==
- Interview with one of the members of "Les Grandes Tables du Monde"
- Philippe Chevrier
