= Paul Cérésole =

Swiss politician and judge (1832-1905)

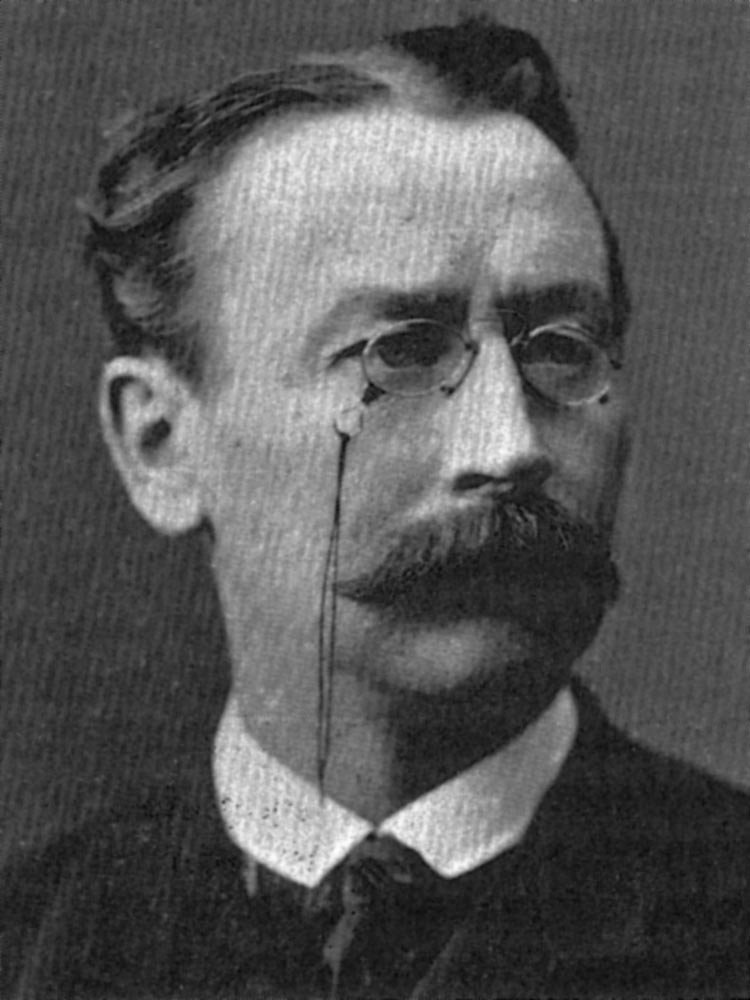
Paul Cérésole

Paul Cérésole (16 November 1832, in Friedrichsdorf, Hesse-Homburg – 7 January 1905) was a Swiss politician, judge of the Supreme Court (1867–1870) and member of the Swiss Federal Council (1870–1875).

He was elected to the Federal Council of Switzerland on 1 February 1870, and handed over office on 31 December 1875. He was affiliated with the Free Democratic Party of Switzerland.

While in office he led the following departments:

- Department of Finance (1870–1871)
- Military Department (1872)
- Political Department as President of the Confederation (1873)
- Department of Justice and Police (1874–1875)

His son Pierre was a noted pacifist.

Cérésole died 1905 in Lausanne.

"Avenue Paul-Cérésole" in Vevey is named for him.

Political offices
Preceded by Victor Ruffy	Member of the Swiss Federal Council; 1870–1875	Succeeded by Numa Droz
