= Josef Escher =

Swiss politician

Josef Escher (17 September 1885, in Simplon – 9 December 1954) was a Swiss politician and member of the Swiss Federal Council (1950–1954).

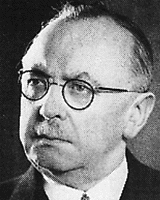
Josef Escher

He was elected to the Federal Council of Switzerland on 14 September 1950 resigned on 26 November 1954 and died on 9 December 1954. He was affiliated to the Christian Democratic People's Party of Switzerland. During his office time he held the Department of Posts and Railways.

Preceded by Albert Picot	President of the National Council; 1948/1949	Succeeded by Jacques Schmid
Preceded by Enrico Celio	Member of the Swiss Federal Council; 1950–1954	Succeeded by Thomas Holenstein
