= Max Weber (Swiss politician) =

Swiss Federal Councilor (1951–1954)

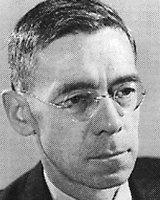
Max Weber

Max Weber (2 August 1897 in Zürich – 2 December 1974 in Bern) was a Swiss politician.

A member of the Social Democratic Party, Weber was seven times elected to the National Council, the lower house of the Swiss parliament (the Federal Assembly), serving continuously from 4 December 1939 to 31 December 1951 and then again from 5 December 1955 to 28 November 1971.

On 13 December 1951 he was elected to the Swiss Federal Council (the seven-member executive that constitutes Switzerland's federal government) where he headed the Federal Department of Finance from 1 January 1952 until 31 December 1953. Weber decided to resign from his seat on the Council with effect from 31 January 1954 after a referendum held on 6 December 1953 had rejected his federal budget proposals.

Preceded by Ernst Nobs	Member of the Swiss Federal Council; 1951–1954	Succeeded by Hans Streuli
