= Rodolphe Rubattel =

Swiss politician (1896-1961)

Rodolphe Rubattel (4 September 1896 – 18 October 1961) was a Swiss politician.

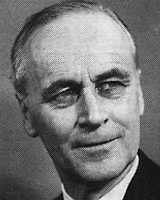
Rodolphe Rubattel

He was elected to the Swiss Federal Council on 11 December 1947 until 31 December 1954, when he handed over the office to another. He has an affiliation to the Free Democratic Party. During his time in office, he held the Federal Department of Economic Affairs.

He was President of the Confederation in 1954.

Preceded by Walther Stampfli	Member of the Swiss Federal Council; 1947–1954	Succeeded by Paul Chaudet
