= Giuseppe Lepori =

Swiss politician

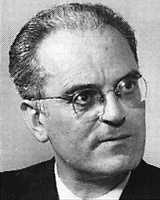

Giuseppe Lepori (2 June 1902 – 6 September 1968) was a Swiss politician.

He was elected to the Federal Council of Switzerland on 16 December 1954 and handed over office on 31 December 1959. He was affiliated to the Christian Democratic People's Party of Switzerland (CVP).

During his time in office he held the Department of Posts and Railways.

Preceded by Karl Kobelt	Member of the Swiss Federal Council; 1954–1959	Succeeded by Hans-Peter Tschudi
