= Jean Bourgknecht =

Swiss politician

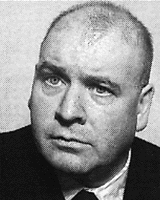
Jean Bourgknecht

Jean Bourgknecht (16 September 1902 – 23 December 1964) was a Swiss politician, mayor of Fribourg (1950–1959) and member of the Swiss Federal Council (1959–1962).

Jean Bourgknecht was born to Louis and Eugénie-Louise Bourgknecht in Fribourg. After getting his doctorate in law in 1926, he worked in his father's office and later headed it until he was elected to the Federal Council of Switzerland. From 1936 to 1947 he was presiding the Law Society of Fribourg and from 1937 to 1941 the Law Society of Switzerland.

He was president of the city of Fribourg from 1950 to 1959. He worked to recover the city's finances. In 1951 he was elected to the National Council of Switzerland for the Christian Democratic People's Party of Switzerland and represented the Canton of Fribourg there until 1955. He was then elected into the Council of States where he represented his canton from 1956 to 1959. Also in 1956 he became president of his party.

He was elected to the Federal Council of Switzerland on 17 December 1959 and handed over office on 30 September 1962 because of an illness. During his time in office he held the Department of Finance.

Preceded by Philipp Etter	Member of the Swiss Federal Council; 1959–1962	Succeeded by Roger Bonvin
