= Markus Feldmann =

Swiss politician

Markus Feldmann (21 May 1897, in Thun, Canton of Bern – 3 November 1958, in Bern) was a Swiss politician, member of the Swiss Federal Council (1951–1958).

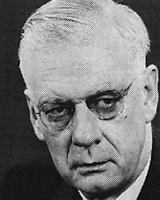
Markus Feldmann

He was elected to the Federal Council on 13 December 1951 and died in office on 3 November 1958. He was affiliated to the Party of Farmers, Traders and Independents (BGB/PAI), now the Swiss People's Party.

During his office time he held the Department of Justice and Police and was President of the Confederation in 1956.

Feldmann coordinated Switzerland's response to the influx of refugees fleeing the Hungarian Revolution of 1956.

Feldmann is buried in the Schosshalden cemetery in Bern.

Preceded by Eduard von Steiger	Member of the Swiss Federal Council; 1951–1958	Succeeded by Friedrich Traugott Wahlen
