= Hans Streuli =

Swiss politician

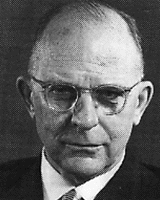
Hans Streuli

Hans Streuli (13 July 1892 – 23 May 1970) was a Swiss politician.

Streuli was elected to the Swiss Federal Council on 22 December 1953 and handed over office on 31 December 1959. He was affiliated with the Free Democratic Party.

During his time in office, he held the Department of Finance and was President of the Confederation in 1957.

Political offices
Preceded by Max Weber	Member of the Swiss Federal Council; 1954–1959	Succeeded by Willy Spühler
