= Thomas Holenstein =

Swiss politician (1896–1962)

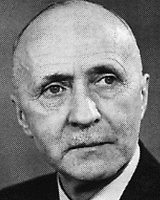

Thomas Holenstein (7 February 1896 – 31 October 1962) was a Swiss politician and member of the Swiss Federal Council (1955–1959).

Holenstein studied law at the University of Bern, finishing in 1920. He then worked as a lawyer in his father's office in St. Gallen.

Politically, he was affiliated to the Christian Democratic People's Party of Switzerland. From 1930 to 1935 he was president of the young conservative movement of the canton of St. Gallen. He was elected to the city parliament of St. Gallen in 1927. From 1936 to 1954 Holenstein served in the canton's parliament, and from 1937 to 1954 he represented his canton in the National Council of Switzerland. He was also the President of the Parliamentary Party from 1942 to 1954 and President of the National Council in 1952.

He was elected to the Federal Council of Switzerland on 16 December 1954. During his time in office he headed up the Federal Department of Economic Affairs and was President of the Confederation in 1958. He resigned on 20 November 1959 for health reasons and handed over office on 31 December 1959.

| Preceded by Karl Renold | President of the National Council; 1951/1952 | Succeeded by Henri Perret |
| Preceded by Josef Escher | Member of the Swiss Federal Council; 1955–1959 | Succeeded by Ludwig von Moos |
