= Hans-Peter Tschudi =

Swiss politician (1913–2002)

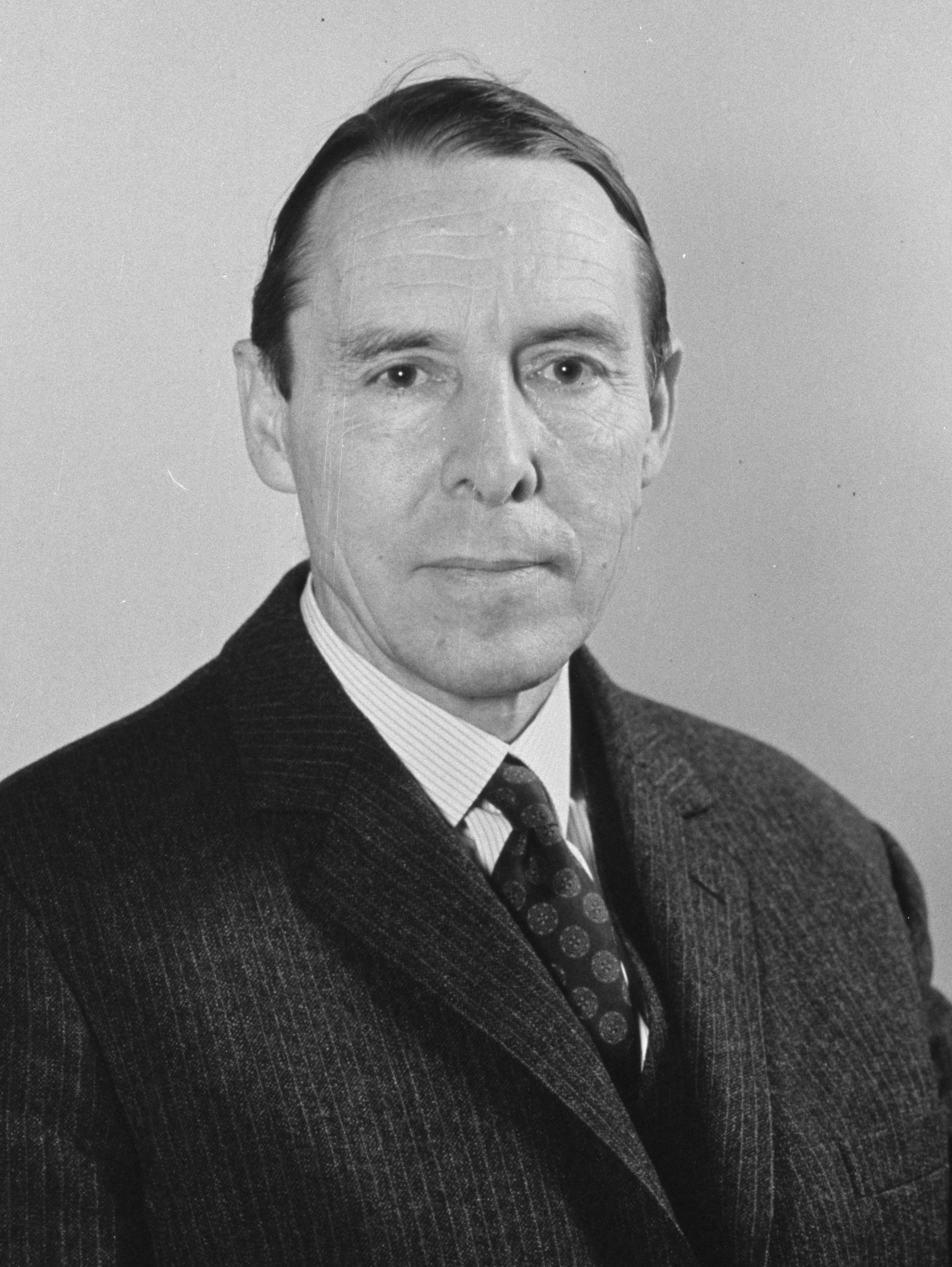

Member of the Swiss Federal Council
- In office 1 January 1960 – 31 December 1973
- Preceded by: Giuseppe Lepori
- Succeeded by: Willi Ritschard

President of Switzerland
- In office 1 January 1970 – 31 December 1970
- Vice President: Rudolf Gnägi
- Preceded by: Ludwig von Moos
- Succeeded by: Rudolf Gnägi
- In office 1 January 1965 – 31 December 1965
- Vice President: Hans Schaffner
- Preceded by: Ludwig von Moos
- Succeeded by: Hans Schaffner

Home Affairs Minister
- In office 1 January 1960 – 31 December 1973
- Preceded by: Philipp Etter
- Succeeded by: Hans Hürlimann

Personal details
- Born: 22 October 1913 Basel, Switzerland
- Died: 30 September 2002 (aged 88) Basel, Switzerland
- Party: SP
- Spouse: Irma Tschudi
- Education: University of Basel

Hans-Peter Tschudi (22 October 1913 – 30 September 2002) was a Swiss politician and member of the Swiss Federal Council (1959–1973) heading the Department of Home Affairs (Swiss interior minister).

Tschudi was a member of the Cantonal Government of Basel-City from 1953 to 1959. He was affiliated to the Social Democratic Party. From 1956, he represented the canton of Basel-City in the Swiss Council of States, until he was elected to the Federal Council of Switzerland on 17 December 1959.

During his time in office he held the Department of Home Affairs and was President of the Confederation twice in 1965 and 1970. Tschudi handed over office on 31 December 1973. In his position as the head of the Department of Home Affairs, he promoted the expansion of social security during the economic boom years.

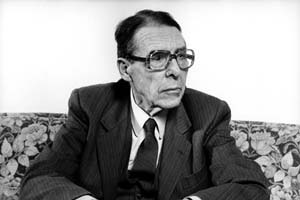
Tschudi in 1983

Political offices
Preceded by Giuseppe Lepori	Member of the Swiss Federal Council; 1960–1973	Succeeded by Willy Ritschard
