= Friedrich Traugott Wahlen =

Swiss agronomist and politician (1899–1985)

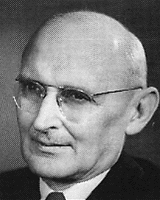
Fritz Wahlen

Friedrich Traugott Wahlen (10 April 1899, in Mirchel, Canton of Bern – 7 November 1985, in Bern) was a Swiss agronomist and politician.

During the Second World War, he was responsible of the Swiss programme to reduce food imports and increase agricultural production, which consisted mainly in extending the cultivation area, and reducing meat production in favour of cereals production. The programme was called after his name, as Wahlen Plan.

He then served as Deputy Director-General of the Food and Agriculture Organization for the UN from July 1958 to January 1959.

He was elected to the Swiss Federal Council on 11 December 1958 and handed over office on 31 December 1965. He was affiliated to the Party of Farmers, Traders and Independents (BGB/PAI), now the Swiss People's Party.

During his time in office he held the following departments:

- Department of Justice and Police (1959)
- Department of Economic Affairs (1960)
- Political Department (1961)
- Department of Economic Affairs (1961)
- Political Department (1962–1965)

He was President of the Confederation in 1961.

== Honours ==
- Empire of Iran : Commemorative Medal of the 2500th Anniversary of the founding of the Persian Empire (14/10/1971).

Political offices
Preceded by Markus Feldmann	Member of the Swiss Federal Council; 1958–1965	Succeeded by Rudolf Gnägi
