= Hans Schaffner =

Swiss politician (1908–2004)

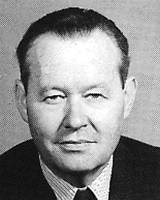

Hans Schaffner (16 December 1908, in Interlaken – 26 November 2004 in Bern) was a Swiss politician and member of the Swiss Federal Council (1961–1970).

He grew up as the son of Robert Schaffner, head judge in Interlaken, and Margaretha (born Abplanalp), a teacher. After his legal studies at the University of Bern he was made a court scribe at the supreme court of the Canton of Bern in 1934, and three years later, he married his wife Ruth Rudolf, a lawyer herself.

He was elected to the Swiss Federal Council on 15 June 1961 and handed over office on 31 January 1970. He is affiliated to the Free Democratic Party. After receiving a degree in law, he entered the federal civil service as the head of the Division in charge of wartime economy (1941). In 1954, he became Director of the Trade Division of the Economic Affairs Department. With the president of the Board of Trade Reginald Maudling, he was during a meeting of non EEC countries in the Alabama Room in Geneva, one of the initiators of the European Free-Trade Association (EFTA) in December 1958.

During his time in office he headed up the Department of Economic Affairs and was President of the Confederation in 1966. During that year, Switzerland became a member of GATT. He prepared measures in favour of agriculture, a new law about labour relations and measures against inflation. After retirement, he held positions in several Boards of directors (Sandoz, Rieter, Câbleries de Cossonay). He fought for liberal and free-trade values.

Preceded by Max Petitpierre	Member of the Swiss Federal Council; 1961–1969	Succeeded by Ernst Brugger
