= Philipp Etter =

Swiss politician

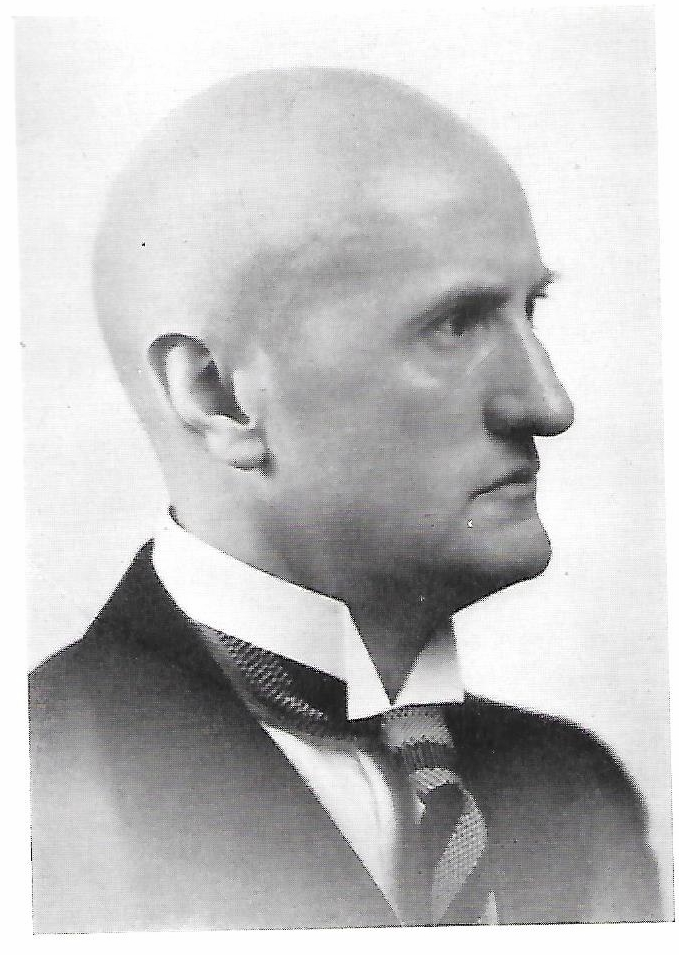
- Official portrait, 1943

President of Switzerland
- In office 1 January 1953 – 31 December 1953
- Constituency: Canton of Zug

Member of the Federal Council (Switzerland)
- In office 28 March 1934 – 31 December 1959

Personal details
- Born: Philipp Etter; 21 December 1891 Menzingen, Switzerland
- Died: 23 December 1977 (aged 86) Bern, Switzerland
- Party: Christian Democratic People's Party of Switzerland
- Spouse: Maria Hegglin (m. 1918)
- Children: 10
- Education: Disentis Abbey School; University of Zurich (PhD)
- Occupation: Lawyer, politician
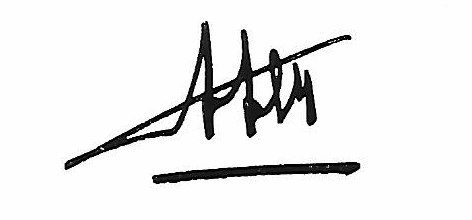
- Signature

Philipp Etter (21 December 1891 – 23 December 1977) was a Swiss lawyer and attorney who most notably served as President of Switzerland four times between 1939 and 1953, whilst concurrently serving on the Federal Council (Switzerland) for the Conservative People's Party between 1934 and 1959.

== Early life and education ==
Etter was born 21 December 1891 in Menzingen, Switzerland, the youngest of four children, to Josef Anton Etter (1843–1923), master cooper, and Jakobea Etter (née Stocker; 1851–1934), a shopkeeper. He was raised in a Catholic family.

After completing his compulsory schooling in Menzingen, he attended the Zug Cantonal School followed by the Einsiedeln Abbey School where he completed his Matura. He then studied Law at the University of Zurich and was admitted to the bar of Schwyz.

== Political career ==
During his office time he held the Department of Home Affairs and was President of the Confederation four times between 1939 and 1953. He was chosen for the Conservative People's Party in the Zug cantonal parliament.

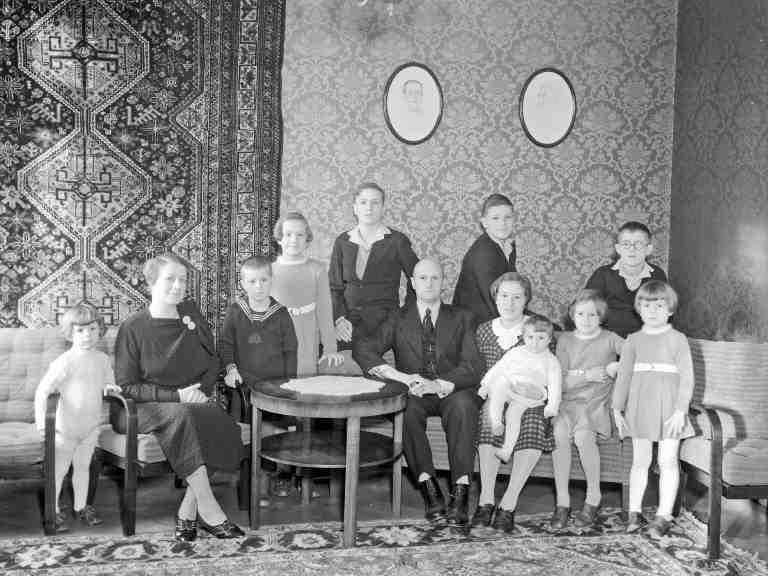
Philip Etter with his wife and ten children

By 1922 he had moved into the Executive Council, where he took over the education and Military Department. Between 1927 and 1928 he was Zugerland Ammann. In 1930 he was elected to the Senate. He was elected to the Federal Council of Switzerland on 28 March 1934 and handed over office on 31 December 1959. He was affiliated with the Christian Democratic People's Party of Switzerland. After the surprise resignation of Freiburg Federal Jean-Marie Musy the Federal Assembly elected the first 43 years of Zug conservatives on 28 March 1934 in the Bundesrat. Etter took over the Department of the Interior, which in its 25-year term - experienced an increasing importance - particularly through the development of the welfare state.

In the prewar years Etter was instrumental in the development of the so-called "spiritual national defense". During World War II, he took a decidedly conservative, adaptable friendly policy toward Nazi Germany and a particularly considerate attitude towards Italy. In the phase of economic and social reconstruction after 1945 he was able to introduce new approaches. His political work was characterized by its central Swiss homeland and his Catholic-conservative world view which, among other things, was permeated by anti-Jewish and anti-Semitic stereotypes. Etter, who represented the idea of a Christian, corporatist authoritarian state, was one of the most important and most prominent political figures of Switzerland in the 20th century.

One of the most shameful aspects of Swiss behaviour during the war was their treatment of Jews seeking refuge from Nazi persecution. The Swiss policy towards Jewish refugees was tightened after a decree from Etter in August 1942:

"…that in future more foreign civilian refugees will have to be sent back even if they might suffer serious disadvantages (such as danger to life and limb) as a result"

Etter was also a member of the Assembly of the ICRC. Two months later he attended a meeting of the Assembly to discuss whether they should launch a public appeal to all the belligerents reminding them of humanitarian principles. The draft proposal covered four subjects – the bombing of civilians, the effect of economic blockade, the fate of civilians who were deported, and treatment of prisoners of war. This was the only meeting he attended. Max Huber was not present, due to ill-health, but Carl Jacob Burckhardt was, as was Marguerite Cramer. The meeting was composed of four women and nineteen men. Marguerite Cramer was convinced that the Committee had a moral duty to speak out. Burckhardt argued that work behind the scenes would be more effective. Philippe Etter argued against a public appeal. Eventually, they deferred to his authority and agreed unanimously not to make the appeal. In the words of David Forsythe: "The ICRC therefore caved in to Swiss national interests as defined in Berne, sacrificing the independence and humanitarian values of the organisation".

== Personal life ==
In 1918, Etter married Maria Hegglin, a daughter of a farmer. They had ten children;

- Maria Etter (born 1919), married to Heinrich Stockmann, five children.
- Philipp Anton Etter (1920–2012), never married and without issue.
- Joseph Etter (1922–2008), an attorney at Nestlé, married to a Ms. Gurtner.
- Alois Etter (1923–2009), an attorney and head of legal at Landis+Gyr, married to Margrith "Gritli" Speck (1929–2010).
- Monika Regina Maria Etter, colloquially Monika Etter (1925–2020), never married and without issue, served on the Grand Council of Bern, for the Christian Democratic People's Party from 1974 to 1978.
- Romuald Etter, colloquially P. Kassian Etter (1929–2009), Benedictine pastor at the Einsiedeln Abbey.
- Leonore Etter, colloquially Sr. Romualda Etter (1930–1986)
- Fritz Etter (1931–2008), married to Dutch-born Heilien van der Snel, four children.
- Margaret Etter

Etter died on 23 December 1977 in Bern, shortly after his 86th birthday.

| Preceded by Jean-Marie Musy | Member of the Swiss Federal Council; 1934–1959 | Succeeded by Jean Bourgknecht |
