= Willy Spühler =

Member of the Swiss Federal Council (1902-1990)

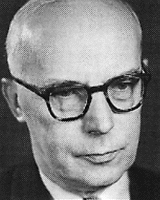

Willy Spühler (31 January 1902, in Zurich – 31 May 1990) was a Swiss politician.

He was elected to the Swiss Federal Council on 17 December 1959, representing the Canton of Zürich, and handed over office on 31 January 1970. He was affiliated to the Social Democratic Party. He was a municipal councillor in Zurich in 1928 and a national councillor from 1938 to 1959. He was the first foreign minister to advocate Switzerland's membership of the United Nations in 1966. One week after de Gaulle's Vive le Québec libre!, Spühler delivered a speech on pluringual Switzerland during Montreal's Universal Exhibition in 1967 .

During his time in office he held the following departments:

- Department of Posts and Railways (1960–1962), renamed Department of Transport, Communications and Energy (1963–1965)
- Political Department (1966–1970)

He was President of the Confederation in 1963 and 1968. After retirement, he presided the Pro Helvetia Foundation and the consultative commission for Switzerland's presence abroad.

Political offices
Preceded by Hans Streuli	Member of the Swiss Federal Council; 1959–1970	Succeeded by Pierre Graber
