= Max Petitpierre =

Swiss politician

Max Petitpierre (26 February 1899 – 25 March 1994) was a Swiss politician, jurist and member of the Swiss Federal Council, heading the Political Department (Ministry of Foreign Affairs) (1945-1961).

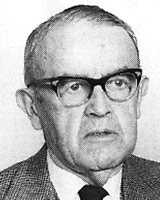
Max Petitpierre

He studied law at the universities of Neuchâtel, Zurich, and Munich. He was elected to the Swiss Federal Council on 14 December 1944 and handed over office on 30 June 1961. He was affiliated to the Free Democratic Party.

He served as President of the Diplomatic Conference at Geneva of 1949 which adopted the landmark 1949 Geneva Conventions.

During his time in office he held the Political Department (Ministry of Foreign Affairs) and was President of the Confederation three times in 1950, 1955 and 1960.

He died at the age of 95.

Political offices
Preceded by Marcel Pilet-Golaz	Member of the Swiss Federal Council; 1944–1961	Succeeded by Hans Schaffner
