= Ludwig von Moos =

Swiss politician (1910–1990)

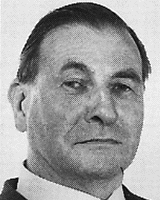

Ludwig von Moos (31 January 1910, in Sachseln – 26 November 1990, in Bern) was a Swiss politician and member of the Swiss Federal Council (1959–1971).

Von Moos was a member of the cantonal government of Obwalden from 1946 to 1959. He was elected to the Federal Council of Switzerland on 17 December 1959 and handed over office on 31 December 1971. He was affiliated to the Conservative-Christian-Social People's Party (Konservativ-Christlichsoziale Volkspartei) (name from 1957–1970, today the Christian Democratic People's Party (CVP/PDC)).

During his time in office he ran the Department of Justice and Police and was President of the Confederation twice in 1964 and 1969.

Von Moos was a citizen of Sachseln, Obwalden.

Preceded by Thomas Holenstein	Member of the Swiss Federal Council; 1959–1971	Succeeded by Kurt Furgler
