= Paul Chaudet =

Swiss politician (1904–1977)

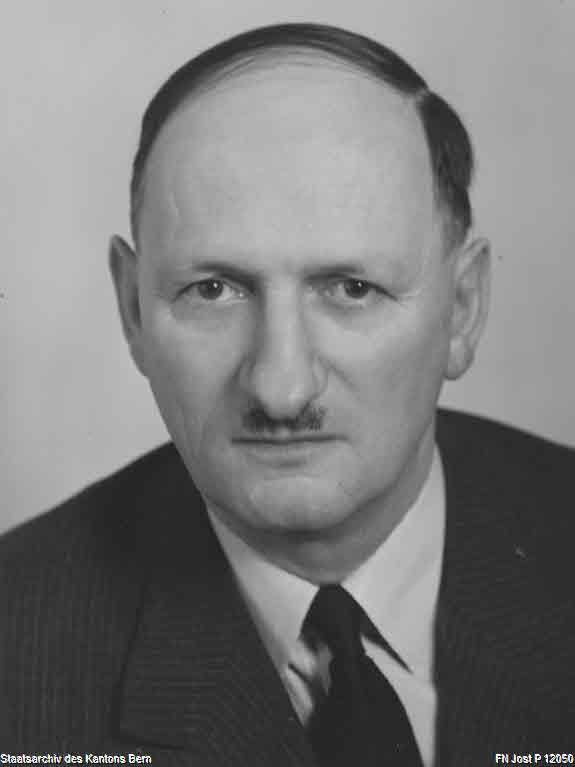
Paul Chaudet (1958)

Paul Chaudet (17 November 1904, in Rivaz – 7 August 1977) was a Swiss politician.

He was elected to the Swiss Federal Council on 16 December 1954 and handed over office on 31 December 1966. He resigned on 28 November 1966 due to the Mirage affair. He was affiliated with the Radical Party. During his time in office, he held the Military Department.

He was President of the Swiss Confederation twice in 1959 and 1962.

Owing to military advisors concerning the purchase of 100 Mirage fighter jets with a budget which increased by 66%, he was forced to resign in 1966 by his own Radical Party.

Along with Jean-Pascal Delamuraz, he was a member of the Swiss Radical Democratic Party. He was a right-wing Swiss politician who maintained political support among both wine-growers and farmers.

The Radical Party has now fused with the right-wing Liberals.

Political offices
Preceded by Rodolphe Rubattel	Member of the Swiss Federal Council; 1954–1966	Succeeded by Nello Celio
