= History of Switzerland =

Since 1848, the Swiss Confederation has been a federal republic of relatively autonomous cantons, some of which have a history of federation that goes back more than 700 years, putting them among the world's oldest surviving republics.

The early history of the region is tied to that of Alpine culture. Switzerland was inhabited by the Helvetii, and it came under Roman rule in the 1st century BC. The Gallo-Roman culture was amalgamated with Germanic influence during late antiquity, with the eastern part of Switzerland becoming Alemannic territory. The area of Switzerland was incorporated into the Frankish Empire in the 6th century. In the High Middle Ages, the eastern German-speaking part belonged to the Duchy of Swabia within the Holy Roman Empire, while the western French-speaking part was part of Burgundy.

The Old Swiss Confederacy in the Late Middle Ages (the Eight Cantons) established its independence from the House of Habsburg and the Duchy of Burgundy, and in the Italian Wars gained territory south of the Alps from the Duchy of Milan. The Swiss Reformation divided the Confederacy and resulted in a drawn-out history of internal strife between the Thirteen Cantons in the Early Modern period. In the wake of the French Revolution, Switzerland fell to a French invasion in 1798 and was reformed into the Helvetic Republic, a French client state. Napoleon's Act of Mediation in 1803 restored the status of Switzerland as a confederation, and after the end of the Napoleonic period, the Swiss Confederation underwent a period of turmoil culminating in a brief civil war in 1847 and the creation of a federal constitution in 1848.

The history of Switzerland since 1848 has been largely one of success and prosperity. Industrialisation transformed the traditional agricultural economy, and Swiss neutrality during the World Wars and the success of the banking industry furthered the ascent of Switzerland to its status as one of the world's most stable economies.

Switzerland signed a free-trade agreement with the European Economic Community in 1972 and has participated in the process of European integration by way of bilateral treaties, but it has notably resisted accession to the European Union (EU) even though its territory almost completely (except for the microstate Liechtenstein) has been surrounded by EU member states since 1995. In 2002, Switzerland joined the United Nations.

== Early history ==
=== Prehistory ===
Archeological evidence suggests that hunter-gatherers were already settled in the lowlands north of the Alps in the Middle Paleolithic period 150,000 years ago. Agriculture in Switzerland began around 5500 BC.

By the Neolithic period, the area was relatively densely populated. Remains of Bronze Age pile dwellings from as early as 3800 BC have been found in the shallow areas of many lakes. Around 1500 BC, Celtic tribes settled in the area. The Raetians lived in the eastern regions, while the west was occupied by the Helvetii.

=== Antiquity ===
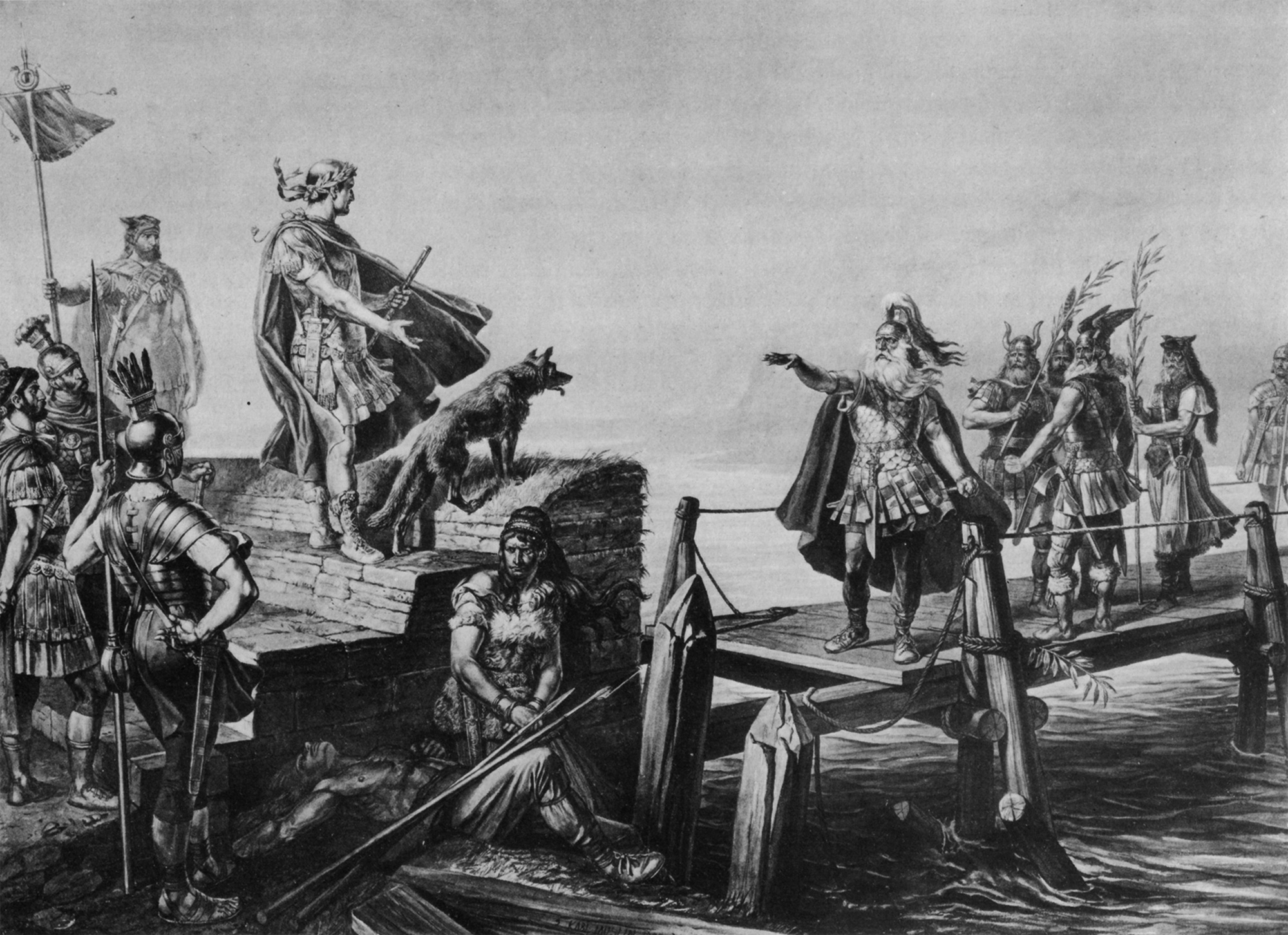
Divico and Julius Caesar after the Battle of Bibracte

In 58 BC, the Helvetii tried to evade migratory pressure from Germanic tribes by moving into Gaul, but were defeated by Julius Caesar's armies and then sent back. The alpine region became integrated into the Roman Empire and was extensively romanized in the course of the following centuries. The center of Roman administration was at Aventicum (Avenches). In 259, Alamanni tribes overran the Limes, putting the settlements on Swiss territory on the frontier of the Roman Empire.

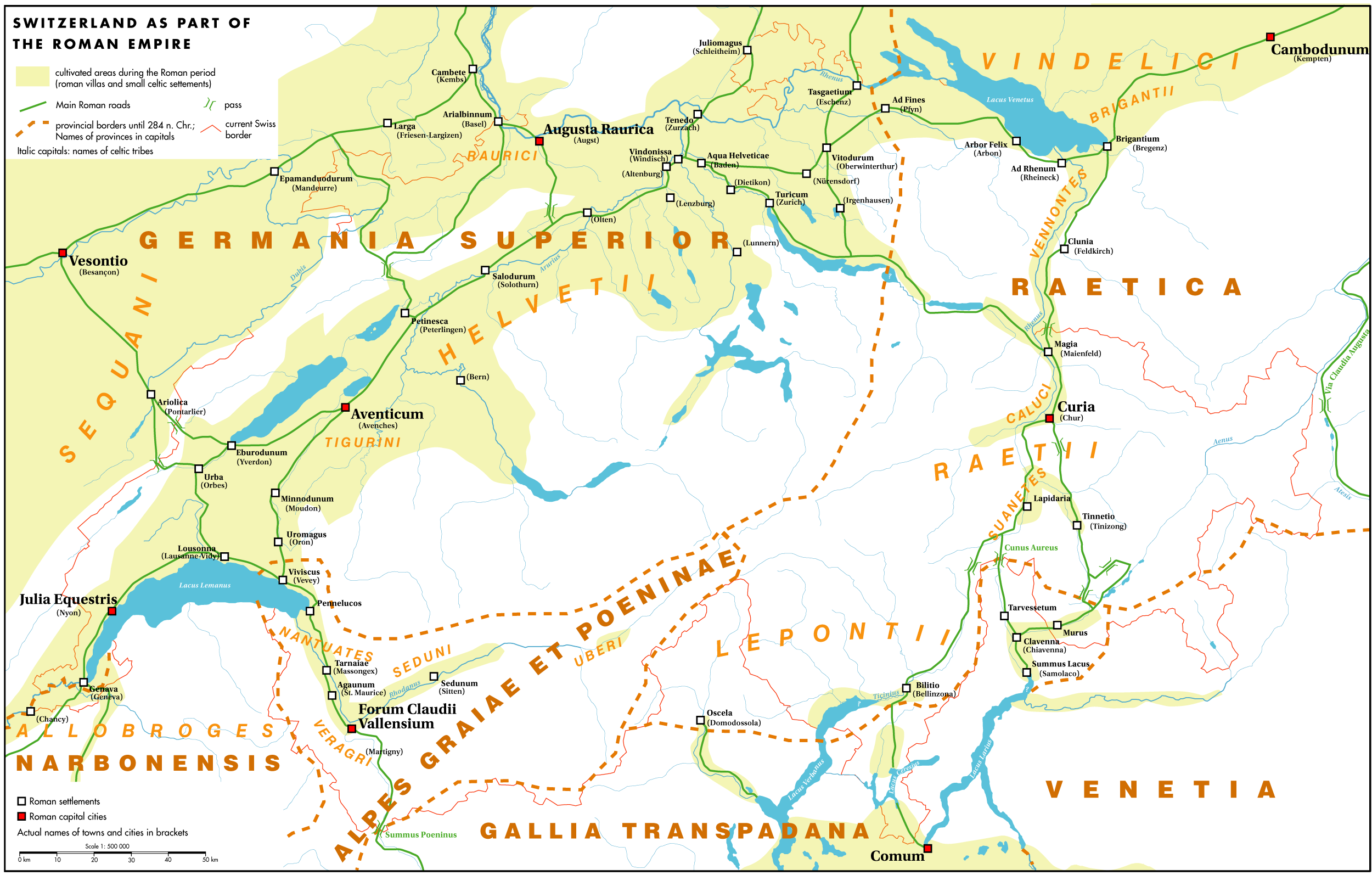
A map of Switzerland during the Roman period

The first Christian bishoprics were founded in the fourth century.

With the fall of the Western Roman Empire, Germanic tribes entered the area. Burgundians settled in the west; while in the north, Alamanni settlers slowly forced the earlier Celto-Roman population to retreat into the mountains. Burgundy became a part of the kingdom of the Franks in 534; three years later, the dukedom of the Alamans followed suit. In the Alaman-controlled region, only isolated Christian communities continued to exist and Irish monks re-introduced the Christian faith in the early 7th century.

=== Medieval period ===
Under the Carolingian kings, the feudal system proliferated, and monasteries and bishoprics were important bases for maintaining the rule. The Treaty of Verdun of 843 assigned Upper Burgundy (the western part of what is today Switzerland) to Lotharingia, and Alemannia (the eastern part) to the eastern kingdom of Louis the German which would become part of the Holy Roman Empire.

In the 10th century, as the rule of the Carolingians waned, The Arabs from Fraxinetum invaded many Swiss cities, controlled the entire Swiss Alps, and their incursions reached as far as St. Gallen in northern Switzerland and southern Germany. Magyars destroyed Basel in 917 and St. Gallen in 926. Only after the victory of King Otto I over the Magyars in 955 in the Battle of Lechfeld, were the Swiss territories reintegrated into the empire.

In the 12th century, the dukes of Zähringen were given authority over part of the Burgundy territories which covered the western part of modern Switzerland. They founded many cities, including Fribourg in 1157, and Bern in 1191. The Zähringer dynasty ended with the death of Berchtold V in 1218, and their cities subsequently became reichsfrei (essentially a city-state within the Holy Roman Empire), while the dukes of Kyburg competed with the house of Habsburg over control of the rural regions of the former Zähringer territory.

Under the Hohenstaufen rule, the alpine passes in Raetia and the St Gotthard Pass gained importance. The latter especially became an important direct route through the mountains. Uri (in 1231) and Schwyz (in 1240) were accorded the Reichsfreiheit to grant the empire direct control over the mountain pass. Most of the territory of Unterwalden at this time belonged to monasteries that had previously become reichsfrei.

The extinction of the Kyburg dynasty paved the way for the Habsburg dynasty to bring much of the territory south of the Rhine under their control, aiding their rise to power. Rudolph of Habsburg, who became King of Germany in 1273, effectively revoked the status of Reichsfreiheit granted to the "Forest Cantons" of Uri, Schwyz, and Unterwalden. The Forest Cantons thus lost their independent status and were governed by reeves.

== Old Confederacy (1300–1798) ==
=== Late Medieval period ===
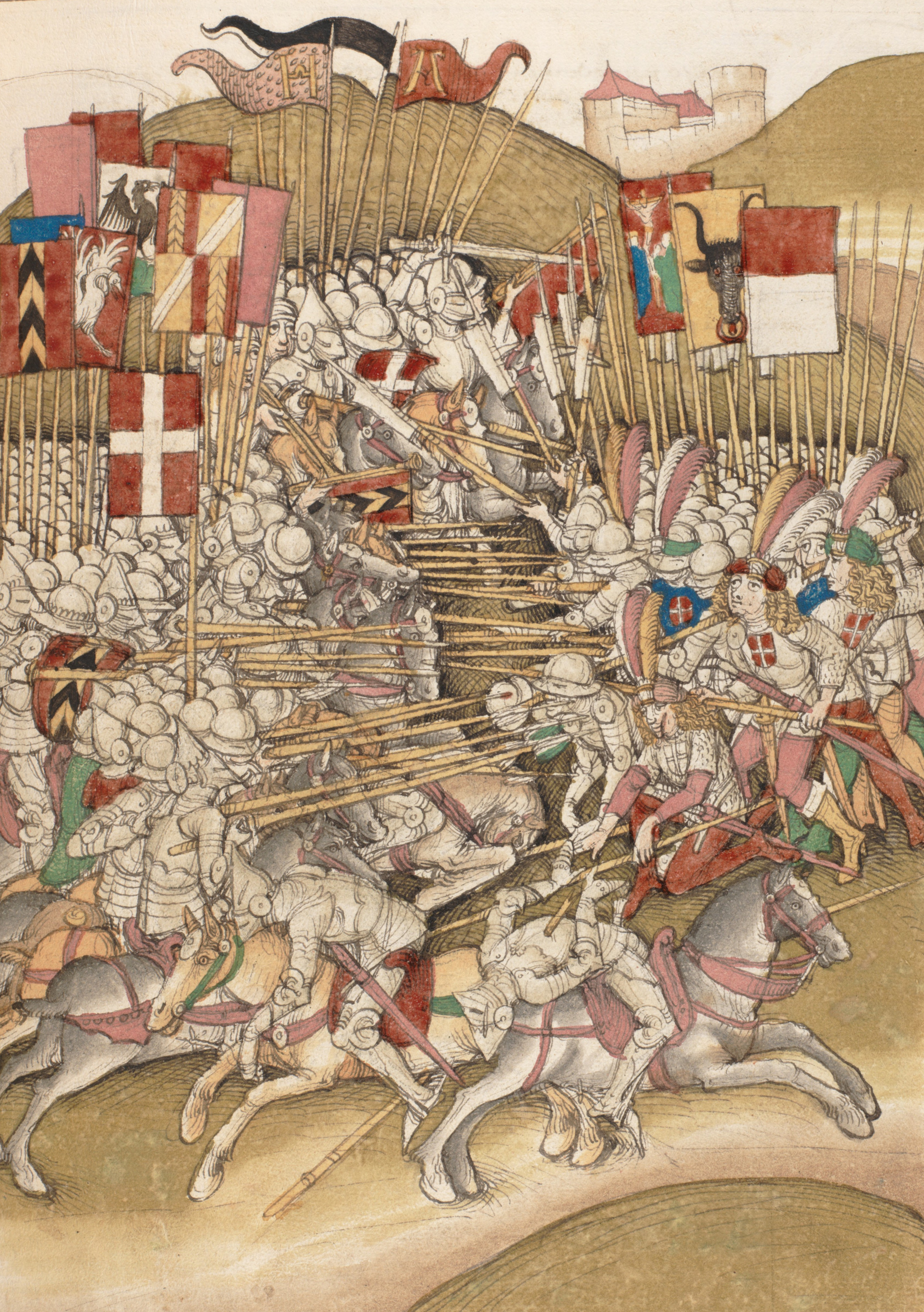
The Battle of Laupen (1339) between Swiss forces and an army of the Dukes of Savoy (Diebold Schilling the Elder, 1480s)

On 1 August 1291, the cantons of Uri, Schwyz, and Unterwalden united to defend the peace upon the death of Emperor Rudolf I of Habsburg, forming the nucleus of the Old Swiss Confederacy.

By 1353, the three original cantons had been joined by the cantons of Glarus and Zug and the city-states of Lucerne, Zürich, and Bern, forming the "Old Federation" of eight states that persisted during much of the 15th century. The Holy Roman Empire built roads and bridges to connect the industrial region of north Italy with the Rhine (linked with the other industrial area of Middle Age Europe, the Burgundian Netherlands), making the peasants and bankers on the road rich, allowing them to buy specialized Italian armor and to stop paying the road collecting taxes to the Empire who built the road. At the Battle of Sempach in 1386, the Swiss defeated the Habsburgs, gaining increased autonomy within the Holy Roman Empire.

Zürich was expelled from the Confederation from 1440 to 1450 due to a conflict over the territory of Toggenburg (the Old Zürich War). The Confederation's power and wealth increased significantly, with victories over Charles the Bold of Burgundy during the Burgundian Wars (1474–1477), greatly due to the success of the Swiss mercenaries, a powerful infantry force constituted by professional soldiers originally from the cantons of the Old Swiss Confederacy. They were notable for their service in foreign armies, especially among the military forces of the Kings of France, throughout the Early Modern period of European history, from the Late Middle Ages to the Renaissance. Their service as mercenaries was at its peak during the Renaissance when their proven battlefield capabilities made them sought-after mercenary troops. The traditional listing order of the cantons of Switzerland reflects this state, listing the eight "Old Cantons" first, with the city-states preceding the founding cantons, followed by cantons that joined the Confederation after 1481, in historical order.

The Swiss defeated the Swabian League in 1499 and gained greater collective autonomy within the Holy Roman Empire, including exemption from the Imperial reforms of 1495 and immunity from most Imperial courts. In 1506, Pope Julius II engaged the Swiss Guard, which continues to serve the papacy to the present day. The expansion of the Confederation and the reputation of invincibility acquired during the earlier wars suffered its first setback in 1515 with the Swiss defeat in the Battle of Marignano.

=== Reformation ===
The Reformation in Switzerland began in 1523, led by Huldrych Zwingli, priest of the Great Minster church in Zürich since 1518. Zürich adopted the Protestant religion, joined by Berne, Basel, and Schaffhausen, while Lucerne, Uri, Schwyz, Nidwalden, Zug, Fribourg, and Solothurn remained Catholic. Glarus and Appenzell were split. This led to multiple inter-cantonal religious wars (Kappeler Kriege) in 1529 and 1531, as each canton usually made the opposing religion illegal, and to the formation of two diets, the Protestant one meeting in Aarau and the Catholic one in Lucerne (as well as the formal full diet still meeting usually in Baden), despite this the Confederation survived.

=== Early Modern Switzerland ===
During the Thirty Years' War, Switzerland was a relative "oasis of peace and prosperity" (Grimmelshausen) in war-torn Europe, mostly because all major powers in Europe depended on Swiss mercenaries, and would not let Switzerland fall into the hands of one of their rivals. Politically, they all tried to take influence, by way of mercenary commanders such as Jörg Jenatsch or Johann Rudolf Wettstein. The Drei Bünde of Grisons, at that point not yet a member of the Confederacy, were involved in the war from 1620, which led to their loss of the Valtellina in 1623.

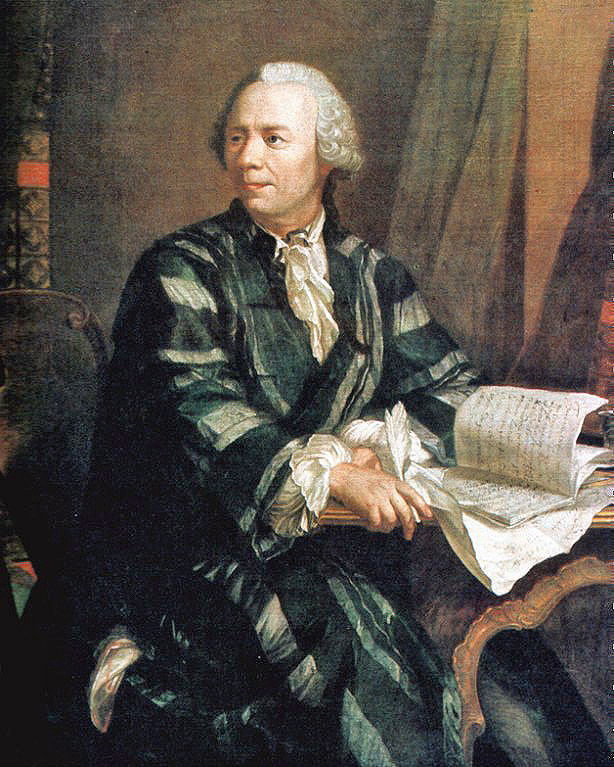
Leonhard Euler (1707–83), one of the most prominent scientists in the Age of Enlightenment

At the Treaty of Westphalia in 1648, Switzerland attained legal independence from the Holy Roman Empire. The Valtellina became a dependency of the Drei Bünde again after the Treaty and remained so until the founding of the Cisalpine Republic by Napoleon Bonaparte in 1797.

In 1653, peasants of territories subject to Lucerne, Bern, Solothurn, and Basel revolted because of currency devaluation. Although the authorities prevailed in this Swiss peasant war, they did pass some tax reforms and the incident in the long term prevented an absolutist development as would occur at some other courts of Europe. The confessional tensions remained, however, and erupted again in the First War of Villmergen, in 1656, and the Toggenburg War (or Second War of Villmergen), in 1712.

== Napoleonic period and aftermath (1798–1848) ==
=== French invasion and Helvetic Republic ===
During the French Revolutionary Wars, the French army invaded Switzerland and turned it into an ally known as the "Helvetic Republic" (1798–1803). It had a central government with little role for cantons. The interference with localism and traditional liberties was deeply resented, although some modernizing reforms took place.

Resistance was strongest in the more traditional Catholic bastions, with armed uprisings breaking out in spring 1798 in the central part of Switzerland. The French Army suppressed the uprisings but support for revolutionary ideas steadily declined. The reform element was weak, and most Swiss resented their loss of local democracy, centralization, new taxes, warfare, and hostility to religion.

Major steps taken to emancipate the Jews included the repeal of special taxes and oaths in 1798. However, many such reforms were turned back in 1815, and not until 1879 were the Jews granted equal rights with the Christians.

In 1803, Napoleon's Act of Mediation partially restored the sovereignty of the cantons, and the former tributary and allied territories of Aargau, Thurgau, Grisons, St. Gallen, Vaud, and Ticino became cantons with equal rights. Napoleon and his enemies fought numerous campaigns in Switzerland that ruined many localities.

=== Restoration and Regeneration ===
The Congress of Vienna of 1814–15 fully re-established Swiss independence and the European powers agreed to recognize permanent Swiss neutrality. At this time, Valais, Neuchâtel, and Geneva also joined Switzerland as new cantons, thereby extending Swiss territory to its current boundaries.

The long-term impact of the French Revolution has been assessed (by William Martin):

It proclaimed the equality of citizens before the law, equality of languages, and freedom of thought and faith; it created Swiss citizenship, the basis of our modern nationality, and the separation of powers, of which the old regime had no conception; it suppressed internal tariffs and other economic restraints; it unified weights and measures, reformed civil and penal law, authorized mixed marriages (between Catholics and Protestants), suppressed torture and improved justice; it developed education and public works.

On 6 April 1814, the so-called "Long Diet" (delegates from all the nineteen cantons) met at Zürich to replace the constitution.

Cantonal constitutions were worked out independently from 1814, in general restoring the late feudal conditions of the 17th and 18th centuries. The Tagsatzung was reorganized by the Federal Treaty (Bundesvertrag) of 7 August 1815.

The liberal Free Democratic Party of Switzerland was strong in the largely Protestant cantons and obtained the majority in the Federal Diet in the early 1840s. It proposed a new Constitution for the Swiss Confederation which would draw the several cantons into a closer relationship. In addition to the centralization of the Swiss government, the new Constitution also included protections for trade and other progressive reform measures. The Federal Diet, with the approval of a majority of cantons, had taken measures against the Catholic Church such as the closure of monasteries and convents in Aargau in 1841, and the seizure of their properties. Catholic Lucerne, in retaliation,1844 recalled the Jesuits to head its education. That succeeded and seven Catholic cantons formed the "Sonderbund." This caused a liberal-radical move in the Protestant cantons to take control of the national Diet in 1847. The Diet ordered the Sonderbund dissolved, igniting a small-scale civil war against rural cantons that were strongholds of pro-Catholic ultramontanism.

=== Sonderbund War of 1847 ===
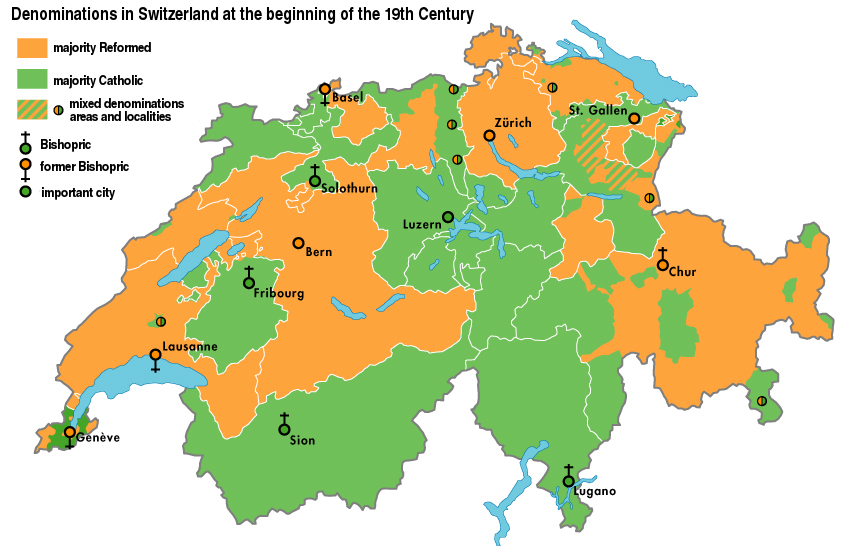
Religious geography in 1800 (orange: Protestant, green: Catholic)

The Radical–liberal–Protestant element charged that the Sonderbund violated the Federal Treaty of 1814, § 6 of which expressly forbade such separate alliances. Forming a majority in the Tagsatzung they decided to dissolve the Sonderbund on October 21, 1847. The odds were against the Catholics, who were heavily outnumbered in population; they were outnumbered in soldiers by 79,000 to 99,000 and lacked enough well-trained soldiers, officers, and generals. When the Sonderbund refused to disband, the national army attacked in a brief civil war between the Catholic and the Protestant cantons, known as the Sonderbundskrieg ("Sonderbund War".) The national army was composed of soldiers from all the other cantons except Neuchâtel and Appenzell Innerrhoden (which remained neutral). The Sonderbund was easily defeated in less than a month; there were about 130 killed. Apart from small riots, this was the last armed conflict on Swiss territory. Many Sonderbund leaders fled to Italy, but the victors were generous. They invited the defeated cantons to join them in a program of federal reform, and a new constitution was drafted along American lines. National issues were to be under the control of the national parliament, and the Jesuits were expelled. The Swiss voted heavily in favor of the new constitution by 2 million against 300,000. Switzerland became calm. However, conservatives around Europe became frightened and prepared their forces to meet possible challenges, which indeed soon exploded the Revolutions of 1848. In those violent revolutions, outside Switzerland, the conservatives were always successful.

== Modern Switzerland (1848–present) ==
=== Industrialisation ===
As a consequence of the civil war, Switzerland adopted a federal constitution in 1848, amending it extensively in 1874 and establishing federal responsibility for defense, trade, and legal matters, leaving all other matters to the cantonal governments. From then, and during much of the 20th century, continuous political, economic, and social improvement has characterized Swiss history.

While Switzerland was primarily rural, the cities experienced an industrial revolution in the late 19th century, focused especially on textiles. In Basel, for example, textiles, including silk, were the leading industry. In 1888 women made up 44% of the wage earners. Nearly half the women worked in the textile mills, with household servants as the second-largest job category. The share of women in the workforce was higher between 1890 and 1910 than it was in the late 1960s and 1970s.

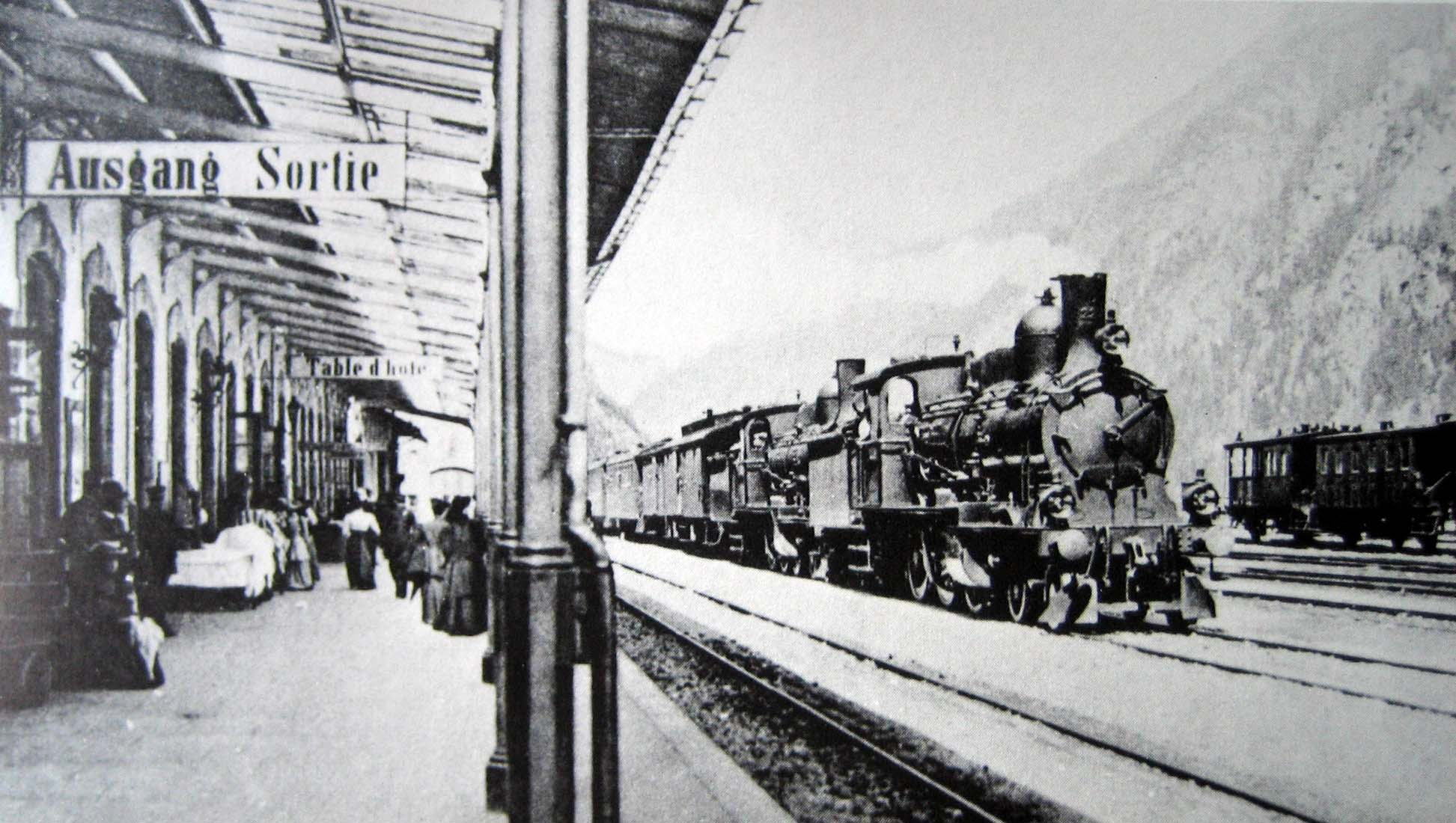
Gotthard line in 1882

Swiss universities in the late 19th century are notable for the number of female students receiving medical education.

One study from the 1890's painted a positive picture of conditions in Switzerland by that time, describing it as having "more beautiful, thriving cities, more clean villages, more well-kept small farms, than in any other like area of Europe" while also stating that the country had "literally hundreds of rural communes in which dependent poverty – as seen in pauperism, in workhouses – is unknown."

=== World Wars (1914–1945) ===
The major powers respected Switzerland's neutrality during World War I. In the Grimm–Hoffmann Affair, the Allies denounced a proposal by one politician to negotiate peace on the Eastern Front; they wanted the war there to continue to tie Germany down.

While the industrial sector began to grow in the mid-19th century, Switzerland's emergence as one of the most prosperous nations in Europe—the "Swiss miracle"—was a development of the short 20th century, among other things tied to the role of Switzerland during the World Wars.

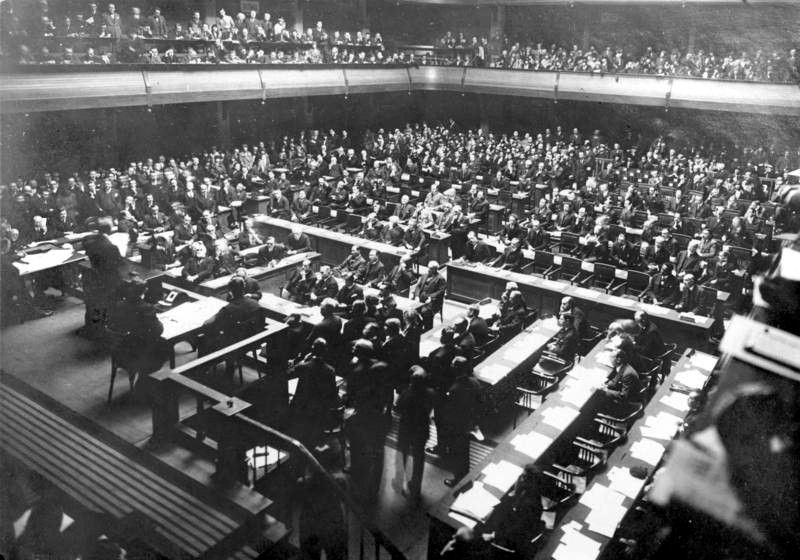
League of Nations conference in Geneva (1926)

Germany considered invading Switzerland during World War II but never attacked. Under General Henri Guisan, the Swiss army prepared for the mass mobilization of militia forces against invasion and prepared strong, well-stockpiled positions high in the Alps known as the Réduit. Switzerland remained independent and neutral through a combination of military deterrence, economic concessions to Germany, and good fortune, as larger events during the war delayed an invasion.

Attempts by Switzerland's small Nazi party to cause an Anschluss with Germany failed miserably, largely due to Switzerland's multicultural heritage, a strong sense of national identity, and long tradition of direct democracy and civil liberties. The Swiss press vigorously criticized the Third Reich, often infuriating German leaders. Switzerland was an important base for espionage by both sides in the conflict, and it often mediated communications between the Axis and Allied powers.

Switzerland's trade was blockaded by both the Allies and the Axis. Both sides openly exerted pressure on Switzerland not to trade with the other. Economic cooperation and extension of credit to the Third Reich varied according to the perceived likelihood of invasion, and the availability of other trading partners. Concessions reached their zenith after a crucial rail link through Vichy France was severed in 1942, leaving Switzerland surrounded by the Axis. Switzerland relied on trade for half of its food and essentially all of its fuel, but controlled vital trans-alpine rail tunnels between Germany and Italy.

Switzerland's most important exports during the war were precision machine tools, watches, jewel bearings (used in bombsights), electricity, and dairy products. During World War Two, the Swiss franc was the only remaining major freely convertible currency in the world, and both the Allies and the Germans sold large amounts of gold to the Swiss National Bank. Between 1940 and 1945, the German Reichsbank sold 1.3 billion francs worth of gold to Swiss Banks in exchange for Swiss francs and other foreign currency.

Hundreds of millions of francs worth of this gold was monetary gold plundered from the central banks of occupied countries. 581,000 francs of "Melmer" gold taken from Holocaust victims in eastern Europe was sold to Swiss banks. In total, trade between Germany and Switzerland contributed about 0.5% to the German war effort but did not significantly lengthen the war.

Over the course of the war, Switzerland interned 300,000 refugees. 104,000 of these were foreign troops interned according to the Rights and Duties of Neutral Powers outlined in the Hague Conventions. The rest were foreign civilians and were either interned or granted tolerance or residence permits by the cantonal authorities. Refugees were not allowed to hold jobs. 60,000 of the refugees were civilians escaping persecution by the Nazis. Of these, 26,000 to 27,000 were Jews. Between 10,000 and 25,000 civilian refugees were refused entry. At the beginning of the war, Switzerland had a Jewish population of between 18,000 and 28,000 and a total population of about 4 million.

Within Switzerland at the time of the conflict, there was moderate polarization. Some were pacifists. Some took sides according to international capitalism or international communism. Others leaned more towards their language group, with some in French-speaking areas more pro-Allied, and some in Swiss-German areas more pro-Axis. The government attempted to thwart the activities of any individual, party, or faction in Switzerland that acted with extremism or attempted to break the unity of the nation. The Swiss-German speaking areas moved linguistically further away from the Standard German spoken in Germany, with more emphasis on local Swiss dialects.

In the 1960s, significant controversy arose among historians regarding the nation's relations with Nazi Germany.

By the 1990s the controversies included a class-action lawsuit brought in New York over Jewish assets in Holocaust-era bank accounts. The government commissioned an authoritative study of Switzerland's interaction with the Nazi regime. The final report by this independent panel of international scholars, known as the Bergier Commission, was issued in 2002.

=== History after 1945 ===
During the Cold War, Swiss authorities considered the construction of a Swiss nuclear bomb. Leading nuclear physicists at the Federal Institute of Technology Zurich such as Paul Scherrer made this a realistic possibility. However, financial problems with the defense budget prevented substantial funds from being allocated, and the Nuclear Non-Proliferation Treaty of 1968 was seen as a valid alternative. All remaining plans for building nuclear weapons were dropped by 1988.

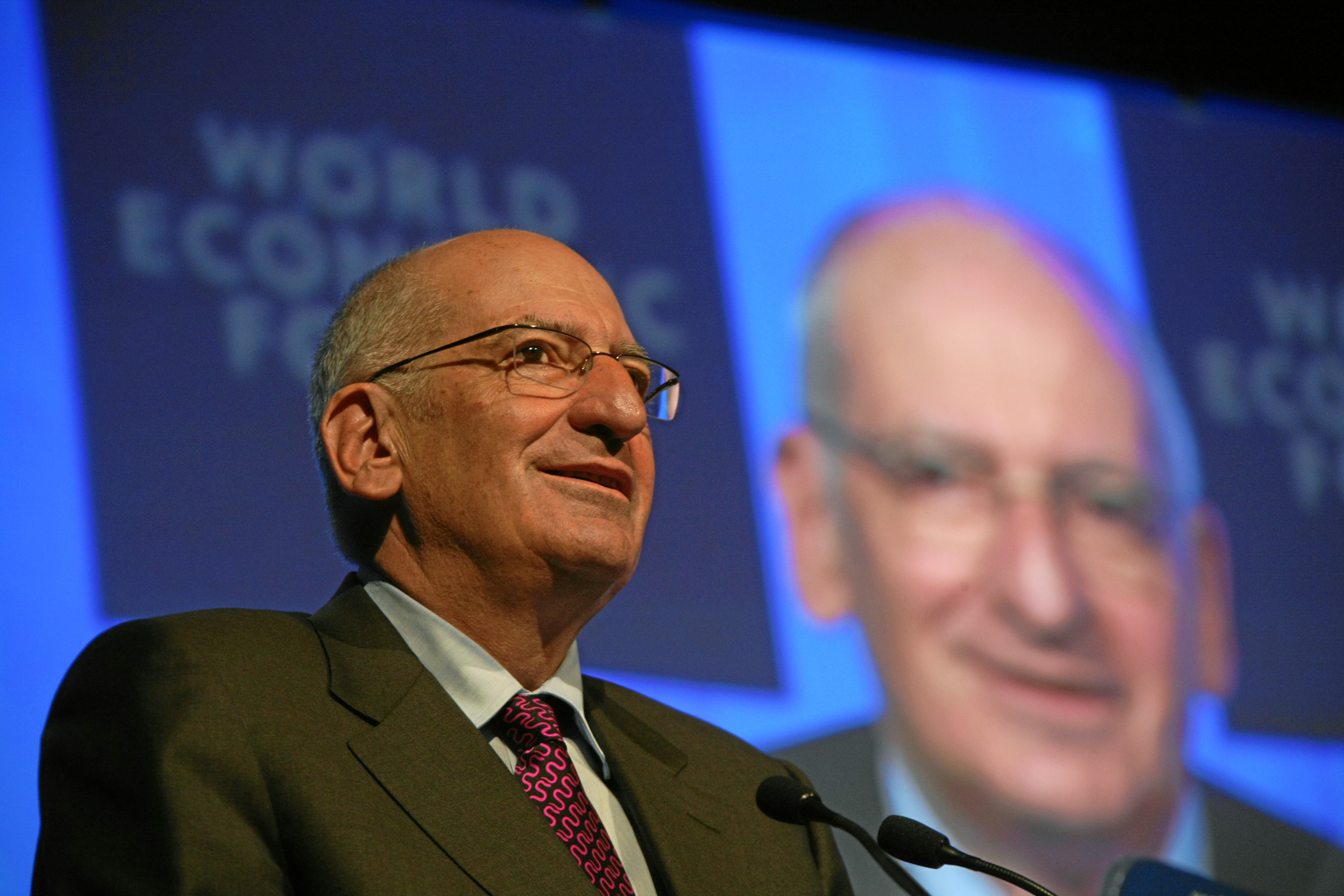
Opening speech by president Pascal Couchepin at the World Economic Forum, one of the many international organizations based in Switzerland

From 1959, the Federal Council, elected by the parliament, is composed of members of the four major parties, the Protestant Free Democrats, the Catholic Christian Democrats, the left-wing Social Democrats, and the right-wing People's Party, essentially creating a system without a sizeable parliamentary opposition (see concordance system), reflecting the powerful position of an opposition in a direct democracy.

In 1963, Switzerland joined the Council of Europe. In 1979, parts of the canton of Bern attained independence, forming the new canton of Jura.

The post-war years witnessed a big rise in the average standard of living, as demonstrated by a steady growth in the percentage of households owning various consumer goods. In 1977, for example, 66.3% of households had a car, 40% a washing machine, 78% a food mixer, 84% a television, 75% a cassette recorder, 98% a transistor radio, and 82% a still camera, while in 1976 28% of households had a radio recorder, 83% a tape recorder, 58% a record player, 52% a toaster, and 94% a vacuum cleaner.

Switzerland's role in many United Nations and international organizations helped to mitigate the country's concern for neutrality. In 2002, Switzerland voters gave 55% of their vote in favour of the UN and joined the United Nations. This followed decades of debate and its previous rejection of membership in 1986 by a 3-1 popular vote.

Swiss women gained the right to vote in national-level elections in 1971, and an equal rights amendment was ratified in 1981; however, not until 1990 did the courts establish full nationwide voting rights for women in all elections.

Switzerland is not a member state of the EU but has been (together with Liechtenstein) surrounded by EU territory since the accession of Austria in 1995. In 2005, Switzerland agreed to join the Schengen treaty and Dublin Convention by popular vote. In February 2014, Swiss voters approved a referendum to reinstitute quotas on immigration to Switzerland, setting off a period of finding an implementation that would not violate the EU's freedom of movement accords that Switzerland adopted.

Following the Russian invasion of Ukraine, Switzerland decided to adopt all EU sanctions against Russia. According to the Swiss President Ignazio Cassis, the measures were "unprecedented but consistent with Swiss neutrality". The administration also confirmed that Switzerland would continue to offer its services to find a peaceful solution to the conflict. Switzerland only participates in humanitarian missions and provides relief supplies to the Ukrainian population and neighbouring countries.

== Order of accession of the cantons ==
The order of precedence of the Swiss cantons given in the federal constitution follows the historical order of accession except for the three city cantons of Zürich, Bern and Lucerne placed at the top.

Eight Cantons

- 1291 founding cantons – Uri, Schwyz, Unterwalden
- 1332 – Lucerne
- 1351 – Zürich
- 1352 – Glarus, Zug
- 1353 – Bern

expansion to Thirteen Cantons

- 1481 – Fribourg, Solothurn
- 1501 – Basel, Schaffhausen
- 1513 – Appenzell

Act of Mediation

- 1803 – St. Gallen, Graubünden, Aargau, Thurgau, Ticino, Vaud

Restoration period

- 1815 – Valais, Neuchâtel, Geneva

Switzerland as a federal state

- 1979 – Jura (secession from Bern)
- 1999 – official status of the six half-cantons as cantons ( Obwalden and Nidwalden, Appenzell Ausserrhoden and Appenzell Innerrhoden, Basel-Stadt and Basel-Landschaft)

== See also ==
- Historiography of Switzerland
- History of the Grisons
- History of Zürich
- History of the Canton of Aargau
- List of presidents of the Swiss Confederation
- Politics of Switzerland
- Postage stamps and postal history of Switzerland

General:

- History of the Alps
- History of Europe

== Bibliography ==
- Balsiger, Jörg. Uphill Struggles: The Politics of Sustainable Mountain Development in Switzerland and California (2009)
- Bonjour, E., H. S. Offler, G. R. Potter. A Short History of Switzerland (1952) online
- Burnett, Amy Nelson and Campi, Emidio (eds). A Companion to the Swiss Reformation (Brill, 2016). ISBN 978-90-04-30102-3
- Church, Clive H., and Randolph C. Head. A Concise History of Switzerland (Cambridge University Press, 2013). pp. 132–161 online
- Codevilla, Angelo M. Between the Alps and a Hard Place: Switzerland in World War II and the Rewriting of History (2000) excerpt and text search
- Dawson, William Harbutt. Social Switzerland: Studies of Present-day Social Movements and Legislation (1897) 302 pp; with focus on social and economic history, poverty, labour online
- Fahrni, Dieter. An Outline History of Switzerland. From the Origins to the Present Day (8th ed. 2003, Pro Helvetia, Zürich). ISBN 3-908102-61-8
- Halbrook, Stephen P. Target Switzerland: Swiss Armed Neutrality in World War II (2003) excerpt and text search
- Lerner, Marc. A Laboratory of Liberty: The Transformation of Political Culture in Republican Switzerland, 1750–1848 (Brill, 2011).
- Luck, James Murray. A History of Switzerland. The First 100,000 Years: Before the Beginnings to the Days of the Present. SPOSS, Palo Alto CA. (1985) ISBN 0-930664-06-X
- Lüthi, Barbara, and Damir Skenderovic, eds. Switzerland and Migration: Historical and Current Perspectives on a Changing Landscape (Springer, 2019).
- Marabello, Thomas Quinn.(2023) "The Origins of Democracy in Switzerland," Swiss American Historical Society Review, Vol. 59: No. 1, Available at: https://scholarsarchive.byu.edu/sahs_review/vol59/iss1/4
- Marabello, Thomas Quinn. "Challenges to Swiss Democracy: Neutrality, Napoleon, & Nationalism," Swiss American Historical Society Review, Jun. 2023, Vol. 59: No. 2. Available at: https://scholarsarchive.byu.edu/sahs_review/vol59/iss2/5
- Oechsli, Wilhelm. History of Switzerland, 1499–1914 (1922) full text online
- Ozment, Steven E. The Reformation in the Cities: The Appeal of Protestantism to Sixteenth-Century Germany and Switzerland (1975)
- Remak, Joachim. A Very Civil War. The Swiss Sonderbund War of 1847. (1993).
- Schelbert, Leo. Historical Dictionary of Switzerland (2007) excerpt and text search
- Wilson, John. History of Switzerland (1832) online
