= Walter Buser =

Swiss politician (1926–2019)

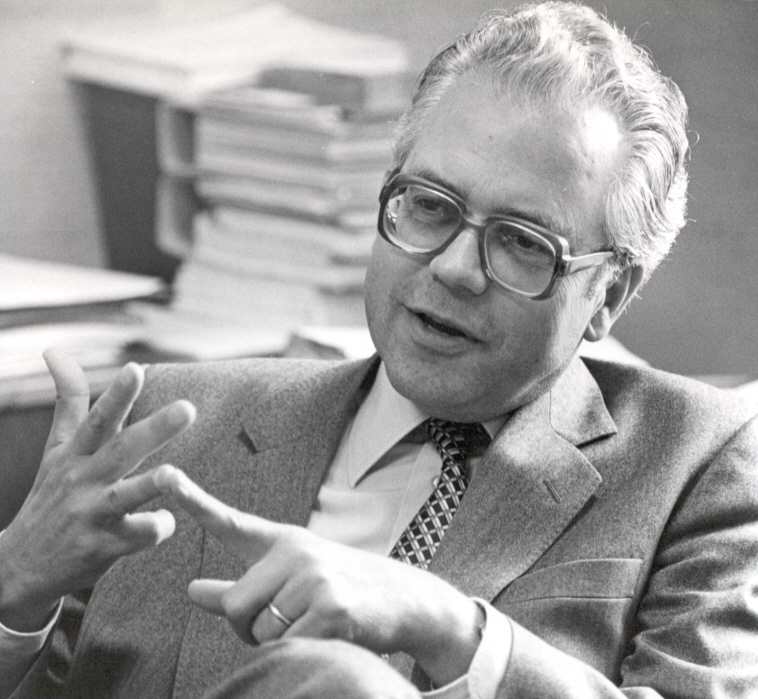
- Walter Buser in 1986

12th Chancellor of Switzerland
- In office 1981–1991
- President: Kurt Furgler; Fritz Honegger; Pierre Aubert; Leon Schlumpf; Alphons Egli; Otto Stich; Jean-Pascal Delamuraz; Arnold Koller; Flavio Cotti
- Deputy: Achille Casanova; François Couchepin
- Preceded by: Karl Huber
- Succeeded by: François Couchepin

Vice-Chancellor
- In office 1968–1981
- Chancellor: Karl Huber

Personal details
- Born: 14 April 1926 Lausen, Switzerland
- Died: 17 August 2019 (aged 93) Ittigen, Switzerland
- Party: Social Democratic Party of Switzerland (SDP)
- Education: University of Basel; University of Bern

Walter Buser (14 April 1926 – 17 August 2019) was a Swiss politician from the Social Democratic Party of Switzerland (SDP).

== Early life and education ==
Buser was born in Lausen, Switzerland, the son of a farmer. He studied at the universities in Basel and Bern, obtaining a doctorate in law in 1958. From 1950, he was a legal advisor and editor of Social-Democratic newspapers. From 1956 to 1962 he was chief editor of the "Socialist Federal House correspondence".

== Career ==
In 1965, he joined the federal administration and spent three years as head of the Legal and Information Service of the Department of Home Affairs. The Federal Council elected him Vice-Chancellor in 1968; in this capacity, he was responsible for legal services and information throughout the federal administration. In 1977 he was appointed an Associate Professor of Public Law at the University of Basel, where he taught in particular the administrative law of the federation.

After the resignation of Chancellor Karl Huber in 1981, Buser ran against Joseph Voyame of the CVP and Hans-Ulrich Ernst of the SVP. He defeated his opponents and became the first Social Democratic Chancellor. Buser introduced regular press conferences and expanded the Federal Chancellery into a staff office of the Federal Council. He also implemented electronic data processing within the Federal Chancellery. He resigned from his post in 1991.

== Death ==
Buser died on 17 August 2019 at the age of 93.
