= Hanna Muralt Müller =

Swiss politician (born 1947)

Hanna Muralt Müller (born 16 November 1947) is a Swiss politician, member of the Social Democratic Party of Switzerland. She held the office of Vice-Chancellor of Switzerland between 1991 and 2005, in charge of the Federal Council sector, which organizes and documents the council's activities. Initially working as a school teacher, she obtained a degree in history at the University of Bern in 1976. In 1978, she worked as a scientific adviser to a parliamentary commission in the canton Bern, before joining the Federal administration in 1983. She first worked for the federal office of education and science, and joined the Chancellery in 1987, leading the Chancellor's general secretariat since February 1988.

In 1991, she became the first woman to be elected to the role of Vice-Chancellor, an office she held until Summer 2005. In her role, she oversaw the creation of the Swiss cantonal and federal administrations' joint web portal www.ch.ch and led initiatives around electronic voting in Switzerland. In 1999, she was nominated by her party for the role of Federal Chancellor, but lost against Annemarie Huber-Hotz, herself to become the first female Federal Chancellor of Switzerland.

At the end of her term, she continued working for the Federal administration on projects centered around e-Governance until her retirement in 2007.

Political offices
Preceded by François Couchepin	Vice-Chancellor of Switzerland; 1991–2005	Succeeded by Corina Casanova
