= Politics of Switzerland =

Political System of Switzerland Politisches System der Schweiz (German) Système politique de la Suisse (French) Sistema politico della Svizzera (Italian) Sistem politic da la Svizra (Romansh)
- Coat of arms of Switzerland
- Polity type: Semi-direct democratic federal republic
- Constitution: Constitution of Switzerland

Legislative branch
- Name: Federal Assembly
- Type: Bicameral
- Meeting place: Federal Palace, Bern
- Upper house
- Name: Council of States
- Presiding officer: Andrea Caroni, President of the Council of States
- Appointer: Popular vote
- Lower house
- Name: National Council
- Presiding officer: Maja Riniker, President of the National Council
- Appointer: Popular vote

Executive branch
- Head of state
- Title: President of the Confederation
- Currently: Guy Parmelin
- Appointer: Federal Assembly
- Cabinet
- Name: Federal Council
- Leader: President
- Deputy leader: Vice President
- Appointer: Federal Assembly
- Headquarters: Federal Palace
- Ministries: 7

Judicial branch
- Name: Judiciary of Switzerland
- Federal Supreme Court
- Seat: Federal Courthouse, Lausanne

Switzerland is a federal state with representative democracy.

- The legislative branch is the Federal Assembly. The Federal Assembly has two parts: the National Council, which represents the public, while the Council of States represents the cantons.
- The executive branch is the Federal Council, which has seven members who are elected by the Federal Assembly.
- The judicial branch is headed by the Federal Supreme Court of Switzerland, whose judges are elected by the Federal Assembly.

For any change in the constitution, a referendum is mandatory; for any change in a law, a referendum can be requested. In addition, the people may present a constitutional popular initiative to introduce amendments to the federal constitution.

The people also assume a role similar to the constitutional court, which does not exist, and thus sovereignty resides with the people, who exercise supreme political power and act as the guardians of the rule of law. According to the V-Dem Democracy indices, Switzerland was, in 2024, the most participatory democratic country in the world and Freedom House has Switzerland as one of the freest countries in the world, scoring 39 out of 40 points on political rights, and 57 out of 60 on civil liberties for a total of 96 out of 100 in 2024.

The Economist Intelligence Unit rated Switzerland a "full democracy" in 2022. According to the V-Dem Democracy indices, Switzerland was, in 2024, the 4th most electorally democratic country in the world.

Cantonal and municipal politics vary in the different cantons, which may have different systems.

== Federal level ==
Federalism refers to a vertical separation of powers. The aim is to avoid the concentration of power in a forum, which allows a moderation of state power and the easing of the duties of the federal state.

In Switzerland, it is above all a matter of designating the independence of the cantons vis-à-vis the Confederation.

=== Executive branch ===
The Swiss Federal Council is a seven-member executive council that heads the federal administration, operating as a combination cabinet and collective presidency. Any Swiss citizen eligible to be a member of the National Council can be elected; candidates do not have to register for the election, or to actually be members of the National Council. The Federal Council is elected by the Federal Assembly for a four-year term. Present members are: Guy Parmelin (SVP/UDC), Ignazio Cassis (FDP/PLR), Karin Keller-Sutter (FDP/PLR), Albert Rösti (SVP/UDC), Élisabeth Baume-Schneider (SP/PS), Beat Jans (SP/PS), and Martin Pfister (DM/LC).

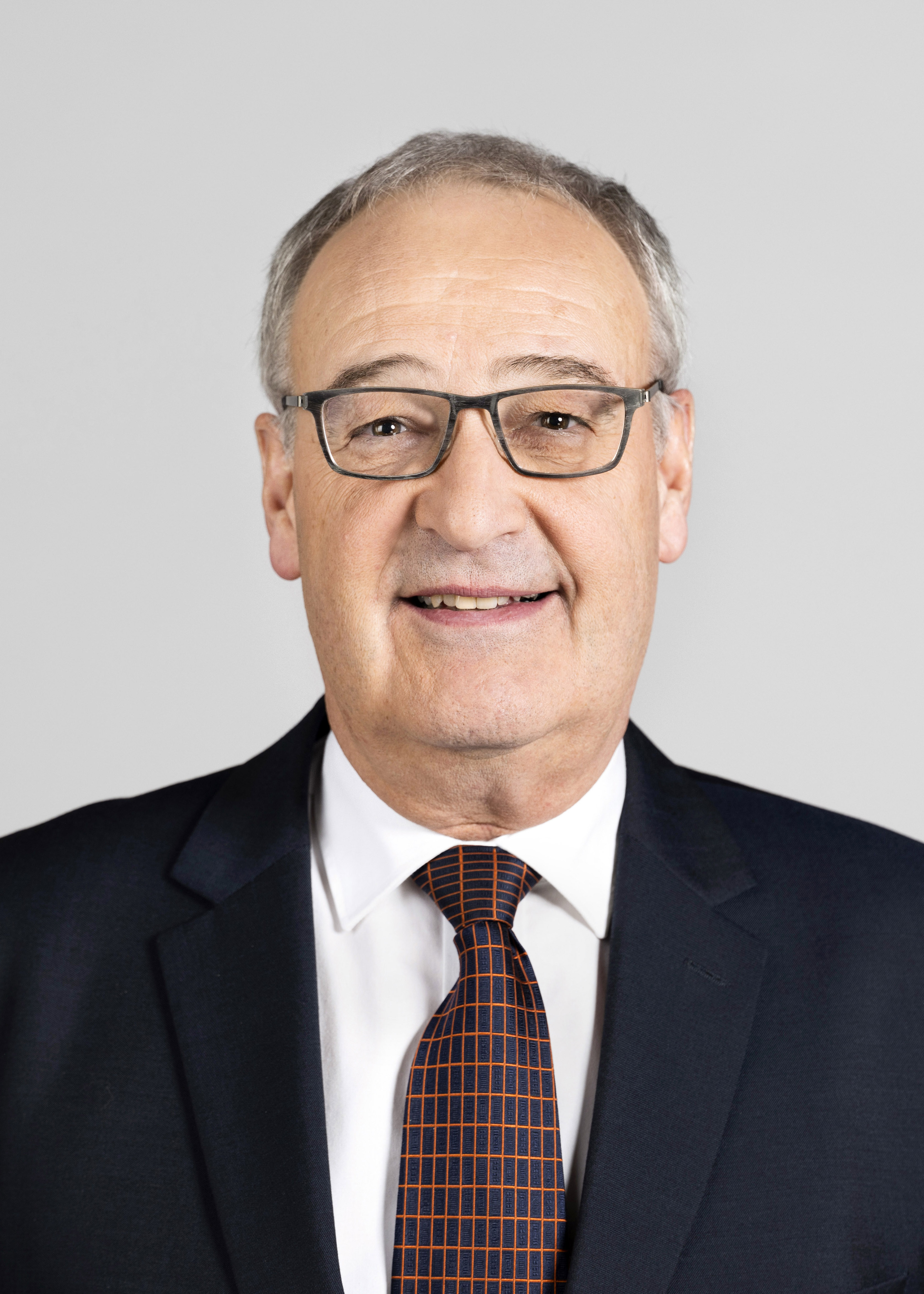
Guy Parmelin has served as President of the Swiss Confederation since 1 January 2026.

The largely ceremonial President and Vice President of the Confederation are elected by the Federal Assembly from among the members of the Federal Council for one-year terms that run concurrently. The President has almost no powers over and above their six colleagues, but undertakes representative functions generally performed by a president or prime minister in single-executive systems. The current President and Vice President are, as of 2026, Guy Parmelin and Ignazio Cassis, respectively.

The Swiss executive is one of the most stable governments worldwide. Since 1848, it has never been renewed entirely simultaneously, providing a long-term continuity. From 1959 to 2003 the Federal Council was composed of a coalition of all major parties in the same ratio: two each from the (now-defunct) Free Democratic Party, Social Democratic Party and (now-defunct) Christian Democratic People's Party and one from the Swiss People's Party. Changes in the Federal Council typically only occur in the event that one of the members resigns (only four incumbent members have been voted out of the office in over 150 years); this member is almost always replaced by someone from the same party (and often also from the same linguistic group).

The Federal Chancellor is the head of the Federal Chancellery of Switzerland, which acts as the general staff of the Federal Council. The Chancellery is divided into three distinct sectors. The Chancellor, currently Viktor Rossi, is the formal head of the Federal Chancellor Sector, comprising the planning and strategy section, the Internal Services section, the political rights section, the federal crisis management training unit of the Federal Administration and the Records and Process Management section.

Two sectors are headed by the Vice-Chancellors: the Federal Council sector headed by Jörg De Bernardi manages the agenda of the Federal Council's meeting. This sector comprises the Section for Federal Council Affairs, the Legal Section, the Official Publications Centre, and the Central Language Services. The Information and Communications Sector is led ad interim by Ursula Eggenberger, following Vice-Chancellor André Simonazzi's death in May 2024; this role also has expanded to become the official spokesman for the Federal Council in 2000. This sector includes the e-Government Section, the Communication Support Section and the Political Forum of the Confederation.

The federal government has been a coalition of the four major political parties since 1959, each with a number of seats that roughly reflects its share of electorate and representation in the federal parliament. The classic distribution of 2 CVP/PDC, 2 SP/PS, 2 FDP/PRD and 1 SVP/UDC as it stood from 1959 to 2003 was known as the "magic formula".

This "magic formula" has been repeatedly criticised: in the 1960s, for excluding leftist opposition parties; in the 1980s, for excluding the emerging Green Party; and particularly after the 1999 election, by the Swiss People's Party, which had by then grown from being the fourth-largest party in the National Council to being the largest. In the 2003 federal election, the Swiss People's Party received (effective 1 January 2004) a second seat in the Federal Council, reducing the share of the Christian Democratic Party to one seat.

=== Legislative branch ===
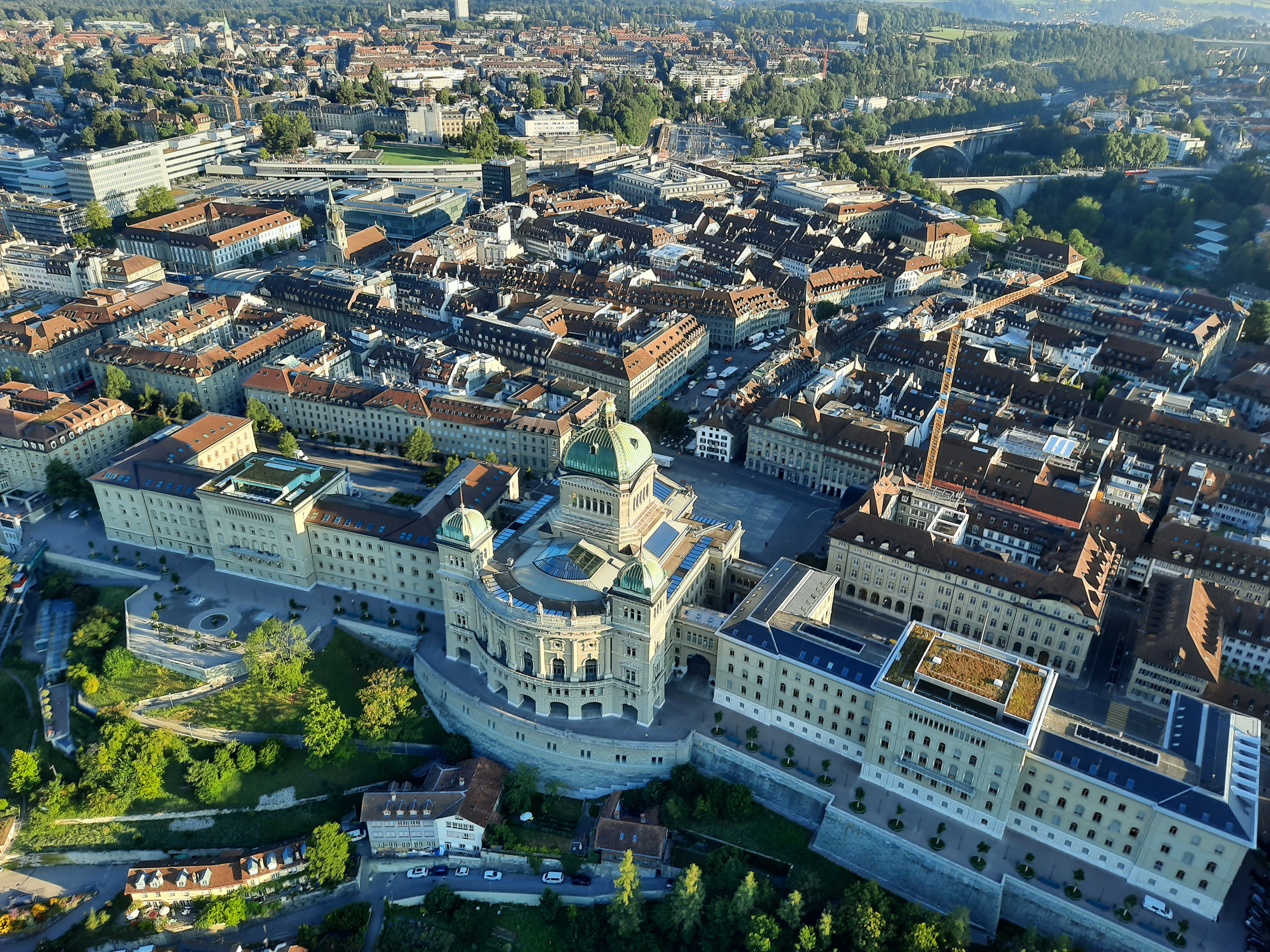
The Federal Palace, in Bern, hosts the Federal Assembly and the Federal Council.

Switzerland has a bicameral parliament, the Federal Assembly, which is composed of:

- the Council of States (46 seats, 2 seats per canton, except for six cantons which only have 1), also known as the upper chamber
- the National Council (200 seats, split between the cantons based on population), also known as the lower chamber

The Federal Assembly convenes to elect the members of the Federal Council. The two chambers are equal (perfect bicameralism). This power-sharing system prevents monopolization of federal politics by more populated cantons to the detriment of smaller and rural cantons.

Members of both houses serve for 4 years and only serve as members of parliament part-time (so-called "Milizsystem" or Citizen legislature).

==== Political parties and elections ====
Switzerland has a rich party landscape. The four parties represented in the Federal Council are generally called the government parties: The Liberals (FDP/PLR), the Social Democratic Party (SP/PS), The Centre (DM/LC) and the Swiss People's Party (SVP/UDC).

=== Judicial branch ===
Switzerland has a Federal Supreme Court, with judges elected for six-year terms by the Federal Assembly. The function of the Federal Supreme Court is to hear appeals of cantonal courts or the administrative rulings of the federal administration. Switzerland does not have a Constitutional Court, and the Supreme Court cannot comment on law put forward by the parliament. This role is assumed by the people, which acts as a guardian and can repeal any legislation or constitutional change.

== Administrative divisions ==
There are 26 cantons in Switzerland. Each canton has its own constitution, legislature, government and courts.

In Appenzell Innerrhoden and Glarus citizens assemble each year for the Landsgemeinde (general assembly) to elect the cantonal government and judiciary and to vote on several issues on the agenda (direct democracy)

== Direct representation ==
Switzerland features a system of government not seen in any other nation: direct representation, sometimes called half-direct democracy (this may be arguable, because theoretically, the sovereign of Switzerland is actually its entire electorate). Referendums on the most important laws have been used since the 1848 constitution.

Amendments to the Federal Constitution of Switzerland, the joining of international organisations, or changes to federal laws that have no foundation in the constitution but will remain in force for more than one year must be put to a popular vote and approved by the majority of both the people and the cantons, a double majority. These are called mandatory referendums. In March 2024, 75% of mandatory referendums were accepted from a total of 226.

Any citizen may challenge a law that has been passed by parliament through an optional referendum. If that person is able to gather 50,000 signatures against the law within 100 days of the legislation being published, a national vote has to be scheduled where voters decide by a simple majority of the voters whether to accept or reject the law. In March 2024, 58% of optional referendums were accepted from a total of 209.

Furthermore, any citizen may seek a decision on an amendment they want to make to the constitution. For such a federal popular initiative to be organised, the signatures of 100,000 voters must be collected within 18 months. Such a federal popular initiative is formulated as a precise new text (general proposal initiatives have been canceled in 2009) whose wording can no longer be changed by parliament and the government. After a successful signature gathering, the Federal Council may create a counterproposal to the proposed amendment and put it to vote on the same day as the original proposal. Such counterproposals are usually a compromise between the status quo and the wording of the initiative. Voters will decide in a national vote whether to accept the initiative amendment, the counterproposal put forward by the government if any, or both. If both are accepted, one has to additionally signal a preference. Initiatives (that are of constitutional level) have to be accepted by a double majority of both the popular votes and a majority of the cantons, while counter-proposals may be of legislative level and hence require only simple majority. In March 2024, 11% of popular initiatives were accepted from a total of 231.

=== Challenges of direct democracy ===
When the optional referendum was first introduced in 1874 and the popular initiative was introduced in 1891, decisions by the liberal government at the time were constantly challenged and blocked through the use of these mechanisms by the conservatives who had lost the civil war in 1849. This resulted in a success rate of less than 50% for government decisions at the time. In this case, these direct democracy mechanisms directly inhibited the government’s ability to legislate and progress decisions.

To resolve this problem, pre-parliamentary consultations were institutionalized in the early 20th century. The Swiss government now undertakes procedures and practices that includes key stakeholders that would have the power and resources to challenge legislation through referendum in the process of formulating and writing legislation. If these key groups respond negatively towards a proposed piece of legislation, the government will often sand down the edges to achieve a compromised position that is less likely to be formally challenged via a referendum or initiative. In the last decade only approximately 5% of legislative acts were challenged to a referendum, of which over 70% were approved in the popular vote.

To ensure that certain powerful groups do not entirely control the narrative on issues up for popular votes, there are rules in place such as prohibiting political advertising on television and radio and the media are required to provide fair and balanced accounts of events related to elections and popular votes.

In June 2026, a national referendum was held in Switzerland on a proposal introduced by the right-wing Swiss People's Party (SVP) that would cap the country's population at 10 million by 2050. The referendum, which drew considerable public and international attention, would require authorities to implement measures preventing the population from exceeding the 10 million threshold if it reaches 9.5 million before 2050. Such measures would include tighter restrictions on family reunification, residence permits, and asylum policies. Critics of the proposal have warned that its implementation could undermine economic stability and harm Switzerland's longstanding ties with European markets.

== Political conditions ==
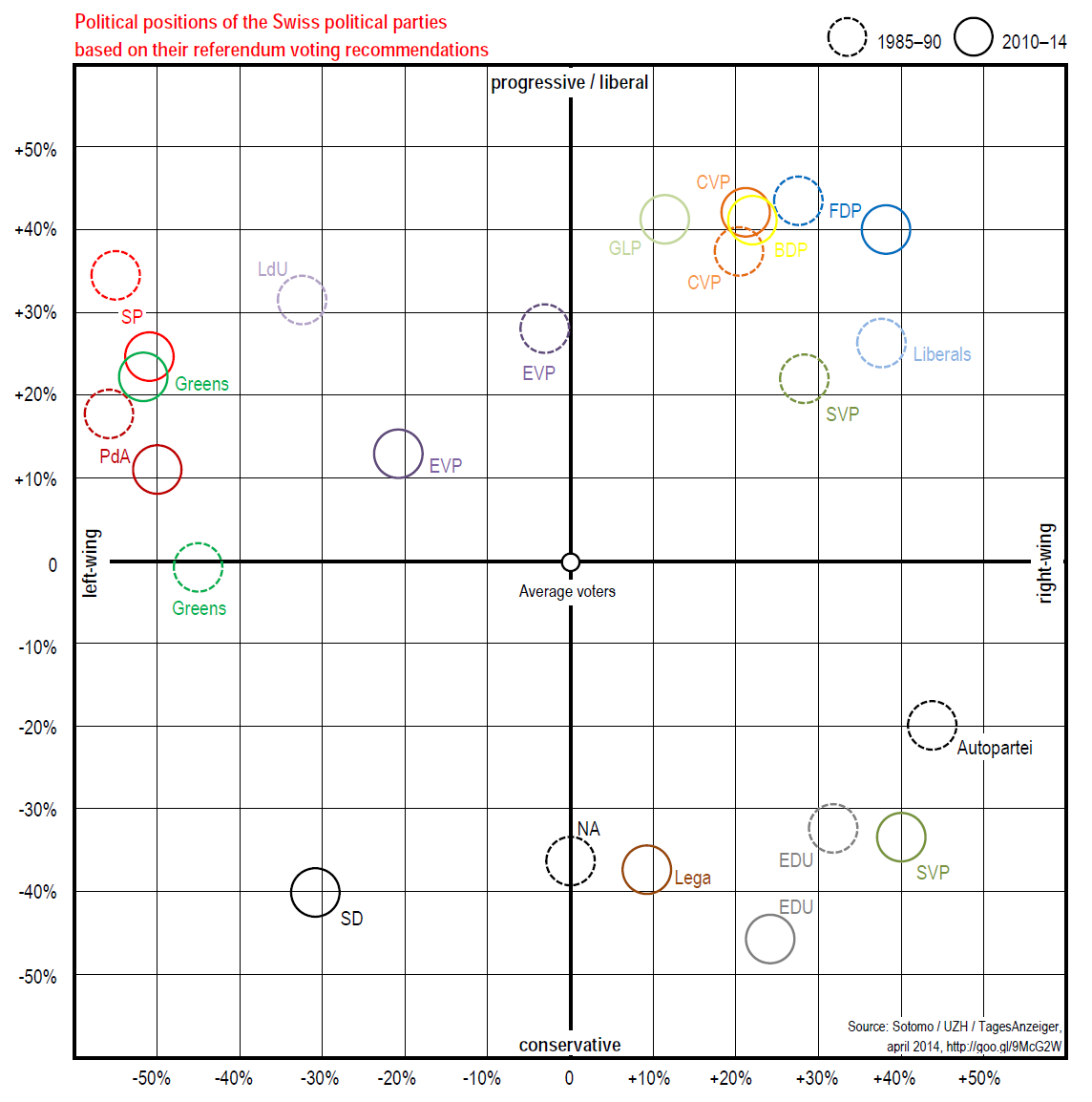
Political positions of the Swiss political parties based on their referendum voting recommendations, 1985-90 and 2010-14

Switzerland has a stable government, with democratic power sharing through consociationalism. Most voters support the government in its philosophy of armed neutrality underlying its foreign and defense policies. Domestic policy poses some major problems, to the point that many observers deem that the system is in crisis but the changing international environment has generated a significant reexamination of Swiss policy in key areas such as defense, neutrality, and immigration. Quadrennial national elections typically produce only marginal changes in party representation.

In recent years, Switzerland has seen a gradual shift in the party landscape. The right-wing Swiss People's Party (SVP), traditionally the junior partner in the four-party coalition government, more than doubled its voting share from 11.0% in 1987 to 22.5% in 1999, rising to 28.9% in 2007, thus overtaking its three coalition partners. This shift in voting shares put a strain on the "magic formula", the power-broking agreement of the four coalition parties. From 1959 until 2004, the seven-seat cabinet had comprised 2 Free Democrats, 2 Christian Democrats, 2 Social Democrats, and 1 Swiss People's Party, but in 2004, the Swiss People's Party took one seat from the Christian Democrats. In 2008 the Conservative Democratic Party split from the SVP, taking both of their Federal Council seats with them. However, the SVP eventually retook both seats, in 2009 and 2015 respectively.

The Swiss Federal Constitution limits federal influence in the formulation of domestic policy and emphasizes the roles of private enterprise and cantonal government. However, in more recent times the powers of the Confederation have increased with regard to education, agriculture, health, energy, the environment, organized crime, and narcotics.

The Economist Intelligence Unit rated Switzerland a "full democracy" in 2022. According to Freedom House, an American NGO, Switzerland is among the freest countries in the world, with a 2020 score of 39/40 on political rights and 57/60 on civil liberties (for a combined score of 96/100). Switzerland has a high level of press freedom, ranking 8th internationally (out of 180 countries) in the 2020 Press Freedom Index published by Reporters Without Borders. Additionally, Switzerland is perceived to be among the least politically corrupt nations in the world, ranking 3rd internationally (tied with Sweden and Singapore) in the 2020 Corruption Perceptions Index published by Transparency International.

=== Protesting in Switzerland ===
While there is not an explicit ban on protesting in Switzerland, the country has been criticized by groups such as Amnesty International for the obligation to gain official approval to protest and shoulder potential costs in some cantons. The 2024 Amnesty International annual report found that peaceful protesters faced disproportionate restrictions by police and cantonal authorities. Amnesty International claim that the right to protest enables individuals to express universally recognized human rights such as freedom of expression, peaceful assembly, the right to life, and more.

== Foreign relations ==
Switzerland has avoided alliances that might entail military, political, or direct economic action. In June 2001, Swiss voters approved new legislation providing for the deployment of armed Swiss troops for international peacekeeping missions under United Nations or Organization for Security and Co-operation in Europe auspices as well as international cooperation in military training. The Swiss have broadened the scope of activities in which they feel able to participate without compromising their neutrality.

Switzerland maintains diplomatic relations with almost all countries and historically has served as a neutral intermediary and host to major international treaty conferences. The country has no major disputes in its bilateral relations.

== Energy politics ==
The electrical energy generated in Switzerland comprises 56.6% hydroelectricity, 32.4% from nuclear power, 8% renewable energy and 3% from conventional sources.

On 18 May 2003, two referendums regarding the future of nuclear power in Switzerland were held. The referendum Electricity Without Nuclear asked for a decision on a nuclear power phase-out and Moratorium Plus asked about an extension of an existing law forbidding the building of new nuclear power plants. Both were turned down: Moratorium Plus by a margin of 41.6% for and 58.4% opposed, and Electricity Without Nuclear by a margin of 33.7% for and 66.3% opposed. The former ten-year moratorium on the construction of new nuclear power plants was the result of a federal popular initiative voted on in 1990 which had passed with 54.5% Yes vs. 45.5% No votes (see Nuclear power in Switzerland for details).

In May 2011, due to the Fukushima accident in Japan, the Swiss government decided to abandon plans to build new nuclear reactors. The country's five existing reactors will be allowed to continue operating, but will not be replaced at the end of their life span. The last will go offline in 2034.

== Confidence ==
According to a 2026-OECD survey, approximately 65% of the Swiss believe the political system gives them a “voice” while sixty-two per cent have “high or moderate trust” in their government, a number which has remained stable over recent years.

== See also ==
- Modern history of Switzerland
- Demographics of Switzerland
- Semidirect democracy
- Federal popular initiative
- Referendum, List of Swiss federal referendums
- Concordance system
- Constitutional conventions of Switzerland
- Hate speech laws in Switzerland
- Voting in Switzerland
- Militia System
- Political Institutions Committee

== Bibliography ==
- Pierre Cormon (2014). Swiss politics for complete beginners : how things work in this strange country where you can happily survive withouh knowing the name of the president, but where you vote on almost everything. Genève: Slatkine. ISBN 978-2-8321-0607-5. OCLC 896111323. Archived from the original on 4 November 2014.
- Hirschbühl, Tina (2011a), The Swiss Government Report 1, Federal Department of Foreign Affairs FDFA, Presence Switzerland, archived from the original on 11 December 2021 – via YouTube
- Hirschbühl, Tina (2011b), The Swiss Government Report 2, Federal Department of Foreign Affairs FDFA, Presence Switzerland, archived from the original on 11 December 2021 – via YouTube
- Hirschbühl, Tina (2011c), How Direct Democracy Works in Switzerland - Report 3, Federal Department of Foreign Affairs FDFA, Presence Switzerland, archived from the original on 11 December 2021 – via YouTube
- Hirschbühl, Tina (2011d), How People in Switzerland Vote - Report 4, Federal Department of Foreign Affairs FDFA, Presence Switzerland, archived from the original on 11 December 2021 – via YouTube
- Hirschbühl, Tina (2011e), Switzerland & the EU: The Bilateral Agreements - Report 5, Federal Department of Foreign Affairs FDFA, Presence Switzerland, archived from the original on 11 December 2021 – via YouTube
- Wolf Linder, Yannis Papadopoulos, Hanspeter Kriesi, Peter Knoepfel, Ulrich Klöti, Pascal Sciarini:
  - Handbook of Swiss Politics, Neue Zürcher Zeitung Publishing, 2007, ISBN 978-3-03823-136-3.
  - Handbuch der Schweizer Politik / Manuel de la politique suisse, Verlag Neue Zürcher Zeitung, 2007, ISBN 978-3-03823-136-3.
- Vincent Golay and Mix et Remix, Swiss political institutions, Éditions loisirs et pédagogie, 2008. ISBN 978-2-606-01295-3.
