= Robert Käslin =

Swiss jurist and politician (1871–1934)

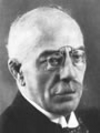

7th Chancellor of Switzerland
- In office 1925–1934
- President: Jean-Marie Musy; Heinrich Häberlin; Giuseppe Motta; Edmund Schulthess; Marcel Pilet-Golaz
- Preceded by: Adolf von Steiger
- Succeeded by: George Bovet

Personal details
- Born: 14 November 1871 Aarau, Switzerland
- Died: 3 July 1934 (aged 62) Bern, Switzerland
- Party: Free Democratic Party of Switzerland (FDP)
- Education: University of Bern; Ludwig-Maximilians-Universität München; Heidelberg University

Robert Käslin (14 November 1871 – 3 July 1934) was a Swiss jurist and politician from the Free Democratic Party of Switzerland (FDP). He served as the 7th Federal Chancellor of Switzerland from 1925 until 1934.

== Early life and education ==
Käslin was born 14 November 1871 in Aarau, Switzerland. He was the son of conductor, choirmaster, and composer Eusebius Käslin, and brother of writer Hans Käslin. He graduated from the district school in Aarau in 1892 and went on to study law at the University of Bern, the Ludwig-Maximilians-Universität München, and Heidelberg University. After obtaining his doctorate, he passed the bar exam in the canton of Aargau and began his career as a law clerk at the District Court of Baden in 1900. He also worked as an editor for the Aargauer Tagblatt.

In 1902, Käslin joined the Swiss federal administration and served as an adjunct in the Federal Department of Justice and Police until 1911. Between 1912 and 1914, he was secretary of the second Expert Committee on the Criminal Code. He returned to the department in 1914, and from 1918 onward, he led it. In 1919, he was elected Federal Vice-Chancellor.

== Federal Chancellor ==
Following the sudden death of Chancellor Adolf von Steiger, Käslin was elected unopposed by the Federal Assembly in 1925. The Catholic Conservative People's Party, which had held a second Federal Council seat since 1919, chose not to contest the chancellorship.

Käslin is considered a pioneer of Swiss government public relations. He was the first Chancellor to hold regular press briefings, establishing communication protocols between the Federal Chancellery and the public.

In March 1934, Käslin resigned due to health concerns.

== Death ==
Käslin died three months after his resignation of heart disease on 3 July 1934 in Bern.
