= Federal Data Protection and Information Commissioner =

- German: Eidgenössischer Datenschutz- und Öffentlichkeitsbeauftragter; French: Préposé fédéral à la protection des données et à la transparence Italian: Incaricato federale della protezione dei dati e della trasparenza

Agency overview
- Formed: 1993; 33 years ago
- Jurisdiction: Federal administration of Switzerland
- Headquarters: Bern
- Minister responsible: Viktor Rossi, Federal Chancellor
- Parent agency: Federal Chancellery
- Website: EDÖB/PFPDT/IFPDT

The Federal Data Protection and Information Commissioner (FDPIC) is responsible to advise, educate and ensure the protection of personal data in Switzerland. It is established by the Federal Act on Data Protection and by the Federal Act on Freedom of Information in the Administration.

The Federal Data Protection and Information Commissioner is responsible for the supervision of federal authorities and private bodies with respect to data protection and freedom of information legislation. It is affiliated with the Federal Chancellery of Switzerland.

The cantons also have data protection and information commissioners.

== History ==
The position of Federal Data Protection Commissioner was created in 1993, with the entry in force (on 1 July 1993) of the Federal Act on Data Protection of 19 June 1992.

The position was renamed Federal Data Protection and Information Commissioner in 2006, with the entry in force (on 1 July 2006) of the Federal Act on Freedom of Information in the Administration of 17 December 2004.

The commissioner is appointed by the Federal Council (for a term of office of four years) and approved by a vote of the Federal Assembly.

== See also ==
- Federal Commissioner for Data Protection and Freedom of Information (Germany)
- Google Street View privacy concerns (Switzerland)
- Personally identifiable information (Switzerland)
- Information privacy
- Information commissioner
