= François Couchepin =

Swiss politician (1935–2023)

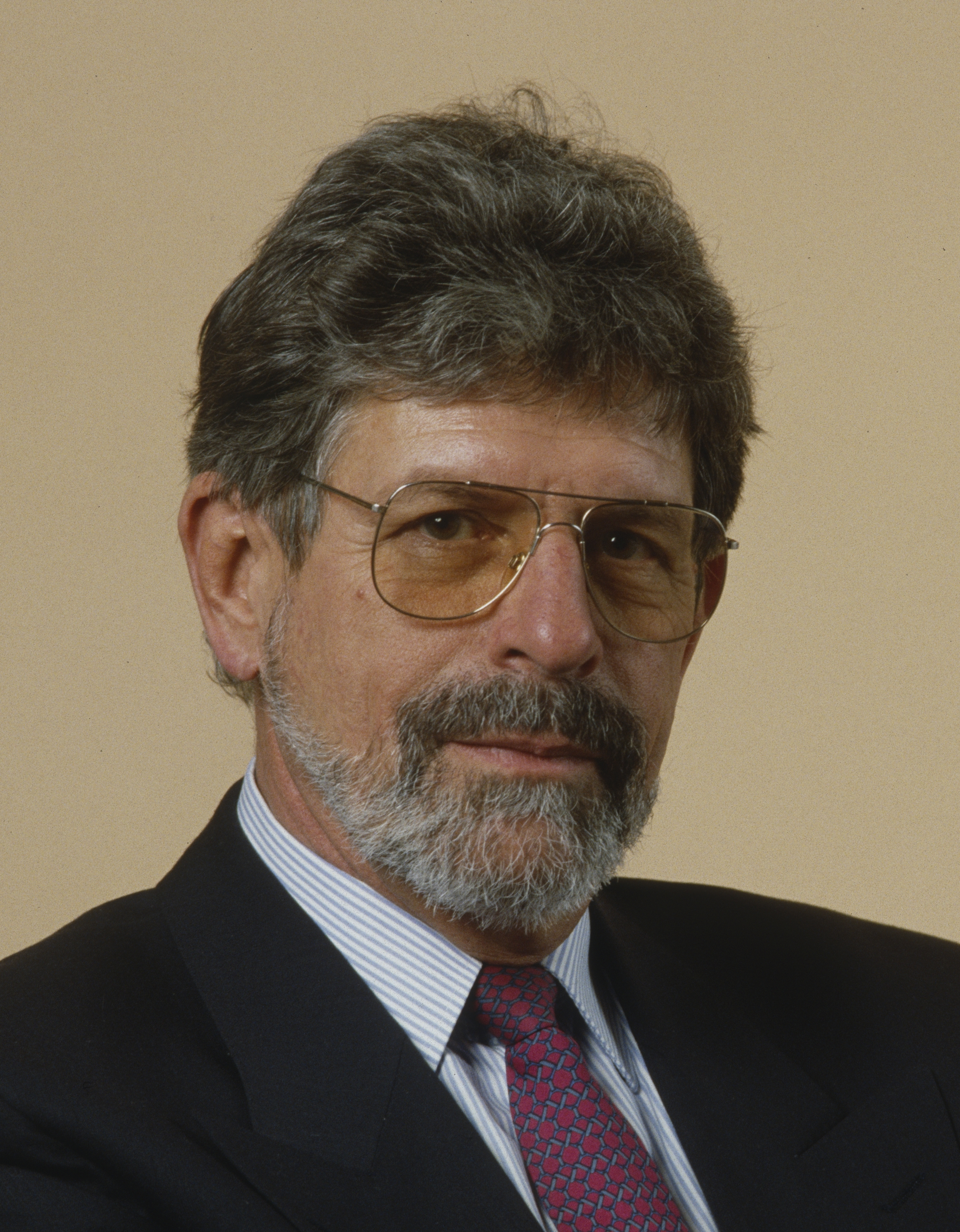
- Couchepin in 1991

13th Chancellor of Switzerland
- In office 1 July 1991 – 31 December 1999
- President: Flavio Cotti; René Felber; Adolf Ogi; Otto Stich; Kaspar Villiger; Jean-Pascal Delamuraz; Arnold Koller; Ruth Dreifuss
- Deputy: Achille Casanova; Hanna Muralt Müller
- Preceded by: Walter Buser
- Succeeded by: Annemarie Huber-Hotz

Personal details
- Born: 19 January 1935 Martigny, Switzerland
- Died: 23 February 2023 (aged 88)
- Party: Free Democratic Party
- Education: University of Lausanne

François Couchepin (French pronunciation: [fʁɑ̃swa kuʃpɛ̃]; 19 January 1935 – 23 February 2023) was a Swiss lawyer and politician who served as Chancellor of Switzerland from 1991 to 1999. He was a member of the now-defunct Free Democratic Party of Switzerland (FDP/PRD).

== Biography ==
The son of federal judge Louis Couchepin and cousin of former Federal Councillor Pascal Couchepin, he studied law at the University of Lausanne. In 1957 he graduated with a licentiate and received patents as a lawyer and notary two years later from the canton of Valais. From 1964 to 1980 he led his own law practice in Martigny. He served in the Grand Council in the canton of Valais (1965–1980) as president of the liberal faction. In 1975 he ran unsuccessfully for the Senate. He was also the deputy secretary of the Swiss Association for the Council of European Municipalities and Regions.

In 1980 Couchepin entered the Federal Chancellery as head of the French department of linguistic services. He was named vice-chancellor the following year, ensuring the preparation of government sessions and taking minutes. In 1990, he was interim processing clerk documents prepared to ensure state security. He was the radical candidate in the race to succeed Walter Buser, facing competition from four opponents. In the sixth ballot, he was finally elected Chancellor on 12 June 1991 against surprise candidate Fritz Mühlemann who was presented at the last minute by the Mayor of Zurich, Sigmund Widmer.

As Chancellor, he prepared two revisions of the federal law on political rights in 1994 and 1996 that reformed the law governing the election of the National Council, namely on the right of initiative and the right to vote. Popular initiatives were now to be submitted to popular vote within ten months after the end of parliamentary debates so that no deadline was planned earlier, which sometimes led to abuse. After the failure of the first draft revision included the appointment of more state secretaries (9 June 1996) he succeeded a year later to pass a more modest reform to the law.

Several organisational changes took place under Couchepin's mandate. The Federal Data Protection Commissioner was assigned to the Federal Chancellery, while the Federal Central Office for Printing and Materials was transferred to the Finance Department from the Federal Chancellery to be fused with the present Federal Office for Buildings and Logistics.

Couchepin oversaw the extensive computerisation of the federal administration, including the creation of databases and websites. As part of the commitment of Switzerland for the pacification of the Balkans, the Federal Chancellery organised the 1996 elections in Mostar, Bosnia and Herzegovina and Kosovo among asylum seekers in Switzerland.

After retiring in 1999, he wrote a petition to Parliament in relation to new laws on asylum and foreigners that collected a significant number of signatures.

Couchepin died on 23 February 2023, at the age of 88.

Political offices
Preceded by Walter Buser	Vice-Chancellor of Switzerland; 1981–1991	Succeeded by Hanna Muralt Müller
Preceded by Walter Buser	Chancellor of Switzerland; 1991–1999	Succeeded by Annemarie Huber-Hotz
