= Schatzmann =

Schatzmann is a surname, and may refer to:

- Dini Schatzmann (born 1994), Swiss actor and model
- Hans Schatzmann (1848–1923), Swiss politician
- Samuel Schatzmann (1955–2016), Swiss equestrian

== See also ==
- Schatzman
