= Federal government of Switzerland =

The federal government of Switzerland may refer to:

- the federal-level government as a whole (see Politics of Switzerland#Federal level)
- the federal administration of Switzerland, the federal executive branch
- the Swiss Federal Council, Switzerland's cabinet and collective head of state/government
