= George Bovet =

Swiss politician

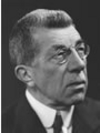

8th Chancellor of Switzerland
- In office 1934–1943
- President: Marcel Pilet-Golaz; Rudolf Minger; Albert Meyer; Giuseppe Motta; Johannes Baumann; Philipp Etter; Ernst Wetter; Enrico Celio
- Preceded by: Robert Käslin
- Succeeded by: Oskar Leimgruber

Personal details
- Born: 27 November 1874 Neuchâtel, Switzerland
- Died: 20 May 1946 (aged 71) Fleurier, Switzerland
- Party: Free Democratic Party of Switzerland (FDP)
- Education: University of Berlin; University of Bern

George Bovet (27 November 1874, Neuchâtel, Switzerland – 20 May 1946) was a Swiss politician from the Free Democratic Party of Switzerland (FDP).

Son of former chancellor of the Canton of Neuchâtel, Henri Alphonse, he went to the University of Berlin to study linguistics, then law at the University of Bern, where he obtained his doctorate.

He began his career as a journalist at National Suisse of La Chaux-de-Fonds (1896-1898), then was the Bern political correspondent of the Revue of Lausanne, Le Temps of Paris, and the Frankfurter Zeitung (1898-1927).

From 1910, he was also employed at the Federal Chancellery as a translator and then as secretary of the National Council from 1911, and finally as vice-chancellor from 1927.

After the resignation of Robert Käslin, Bovet was elected Chancellor of Switzerland in 1935 following a difficult election facing catholic-conservative candidate Oskar Leimgruber, who would eventually become chancellor after Bovet.

He served as chancellor until 1943 and during this period waives the second Francophone Vice Chancellor, assuming editorials himself in French. Bovet was the second French-speaking Chancellor. He resigned in 1943 and died three years later.
