= Andrea Arcidiacono =

Swiss journalist and communications manager

Andrea Arcidiacono (born 20 April 1966) is a Swiss journalist and communications manager. He briefly held the office of Vice-Chancellor of Switzerland and spokesperson for the Federal Council between October 2024 and March 2025.

After obtaining a bachelor in economy at the University of St. Gallen in 1991, Arcidiacono began a career as political reporter in Bern on behalf of the Radiotelevisione svizzera and the Corriere del Ticino. From 1998 on, he held various roles as spokesperson for Federal Councilors Ruth Dreifuss (1998-2002) and Pascal Couchepin (2006-2007), the Federal Administrative Court (2009-2011) and the Federal Office of Public Health (2017-1018).

He further headed the Italian language redaction of Swissinfo between 2007 and 2009, led multiple programs at Presence Switzerland between 2011 and 2016, and was spokesperson for the health insurance association Curafutura (2016-2017). He founded his communications and PR agency Acridiacono Consulting Partners GmbH in 2019 and led it until his nomination as vice-chancellor.

He was recommended by Federal Chancellor Viktor Rossi as a successor for André Simonazzi and took office on 1 October 2024. However, he announced his wish to quit the office by March 31, 2025 for personal reasons. He was succeeded ad interim by Ursula Eggenberger, who already held the post following the passing of André Simonazzi.

Political offices
Preceded by Ursula Eggenberger (ad interim)	Vice-Chancellor of Switzerland; 2024–2025	Succeeded by Ursula Eggenberger (ad interim)
