= Rachel Salzmann =

Swiss businesswoman and politician

Vice-Chancellor of Switzerland
- Incumbent
- Assumed office 1 July 2024
- Chancellor: Viktor Rossi
- Preceded by: Viktor Rossi; Jörg De Bernardi (ad interim)

Personal details
- Born: December 8, 1981 (age 44) Naters VS
- Party: The Centre
- Education: Bern University of Applied Sciences; University of Bern

Rachel Salzmann (born 8 December 1981) is a Swiss businesswoman and politician.

Having obtained a Master of Business Administration from the Bern University of Applied Sciences specialized in Public Management, she worked at the Federal Department of Environment, Transport, Energy and Communications from 2012 to 2018, where she served as a personal advisor to Federal Council member Doris Leuthard. She then became head of Public and Regulatory Affairs at a Credit Suisse subsidiary, the Credit Suisse Energy Infrastructure Partners AG, before becoming chief of staff to the CEO of Swiss health insurance company CSS.

She was named Vice-Chancellor of Switzerland by the Federal Council on 8 March 2024 and replaced Jörg De Bernardi on July 1, who held the role ad interim after the election of Viktor Rossi as Federal Chancellor of Switzerland.

Political offices
Preceded by Jörg De Bernardi	Vice-Chancellor of Switzerland; 2024-present	Incumbent
