= Hans Schatzmann =

Swiss politician and lawyer (1849–1923)

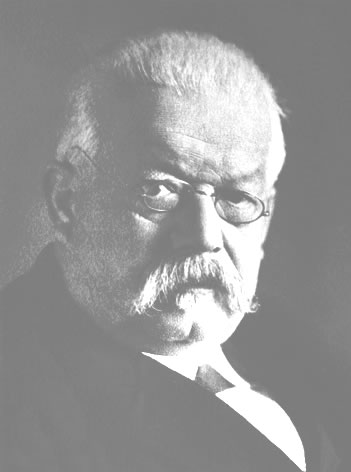

5th Chancellor of Switzerland
- In office 1909–1918
- President: Robert Comtesse; Marc-Émile Ruchet; Ludwig Forrer; Eduard Müller; Arthur Hoffmann; Giuseppe Motta; Camille Decoppet; Edmund Schulthess; Felix Calonder
- Preceded by: Gottlieb Ringier
- Succeeded by: Adolf von Steiger

Personal details
- Born: 24 January 1848 Windisch, Switzerland
- Died: 12 July 1923 (aged 75) Bern, Switzerland
- Party: Free Democratic Party of Switzerland (FDP)
- Education: University of Zurich; Heidelberg University; Ludwig-Maximilians-Universität München; Friedrich Wilhelm University of Berlin

Hans Schatzmann (24 January 1848 – 12 July 1923) was a Swiss politician who served as the fifth Chancellor of Switzerland.

== Early life and education ==
Schatzmann was born 24 January 1848 in Windisch, Switzerland

He studied at Aarau, then pursued legal studies at the University of Zurich, Heidelberg University, the Ludwig-Maximilians-Universität München, and the Friedrich Wilhelm University of Berlin, where he passed his bar exam in 1871.

He worked in Brugg and Lenzburg before being named tribunal president in Aarau. In 1879, he was named Secretary and bureau chief of the Federal Chancellery. He became Vice-Chancellor in 1881, where he would frequently serve as acting Chancellor as the holder of that title Gottlieb Ringier was ill. He was elected as Chancellor in 1909.

As a specialist in federal administration, he participated in the redaction of the law on federal administration in 1914 and was the founder of the publication Federal Paper in Italian. He retired in 1918.

== Death ==
Schatzmann died of apoplexy on 12 July 1923 in Bern.
