= Johann Ulrich Schiess =

Swiss politician (1813–1883)

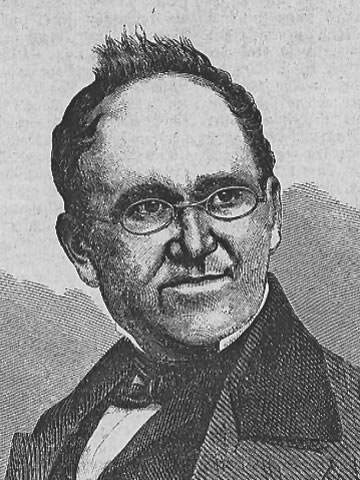

3rd Chancellor of Switzerland
- In office 1848–1881
- President: Jonas Furrer; Henri Druey; Josef Munzinger; Wilhelm Matthias Naeff; Friedrich Frey-Herosé; Jakob Stämpfli; Constant Fornerod; Melchior Josef Martin Knüsel; Jakob Dubs; Karl Schenk; Emil Welti; Paul Cérésole; Johann Jakob Scherer; Joachim Heer; Bernhard Hammer; Numa Droz
- Preceded by: Karl Nikolaus von Flüe AmRhyn
- Succeeded by: Gottlieb Ringier

Personal details
- Born: 21 February 1813 Wald, Appenzell Ausserrhoden, Switzerland
- Died: 6 July 1883 (aged 70) Bern, Switzerland
- Education: University of Bâle; University of Jena; University of Berlin; University of Göttingen

Johann Ulrich Schiess (21 February 1813 in Wald, Appenzell Ausserrhoden – 6 July 1883) was a Swiss politician who served as the third Chancellor of Switzerland.

== Early life and education ==
Schiess was born 21 February 1813 in Wald, Appenzell Ausserrhoden, Switzerland.

After having studied at the University of Basel, he successively studied at Jena, Berlin, and Göttingen, where he obtained a doctorate in 1835. He was a member of the Jenaischen fraternity.

== Career ==
Beginning his working life as an archivist, he became a magistrate from 1836 to 1839 and was elected Chancellor of State of the canton of Appenzell Ausserrhoden (1839-1847). In July 1847, he learned from the newspapers of his appointment as Secretary of State of the Confederacy and took office in November 1847. He also acted as the Federal Chancellor after the resignation of Franz Josef Karl Amrhyn in the Sonderbund crisis.

In the autumn of 1848, the Diet formally elected Schiess as the first Chancellor of the Confederation following the adoption of the Federal Constitution of 1848, a position he held for 33 years. He was awarded an honorary doctorate from the University of Jena in 1862. The Federal Council entrusted him several times with diplomatic missions to neighbouring countries.

Following his tenure as Chancellor, he was elected to the National Council as a representative of the canton of Appenzell Ausserrhoden, serving until he died from a stroke on 6 July 1883 in Bern.
