= Gottlieb Ringier =

Swiss politician (1837–1929)

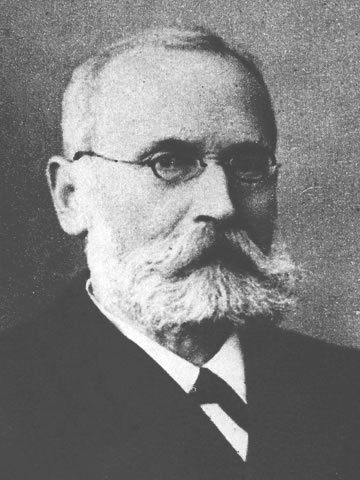

4th Chancellor of Switzerland
- In office 1882–1909
- President: Simeon Bavier; Louis Ruchonnet; Emil Welti; Karl Schenk; Adolf Deucher; Numa Droz; Wilhelm Hertenstein; Bernhard Hammer; Walter Hauser; Emil Frey; Josef Zemp; Adrien Lachenal; Eugene Ruffy; Eduard Müller; Ernst Brenner; Robert Comtesse; Marc-Émile Ruchet; Ludwig Forrer
- Preceded by: Johann Ulrich Schiess
- Succeeded by: Hans Schatzmann

Personal details
- Born: 8 December 1837 Sumiswald, Switzerland
- Died: 7 January 1929 (aged 91) Bern, Switzerland
- Party: Free Democratic Party of Switzerland (FDP)
- Education: University of Basel; Ludwig-Maximilians-Universität München; Heidelberg University

Karl Albrecht Gottlieb Ringier (8 December 1837 – 7 January 1929) was a Swiss politician, President of the Swiss Council of States (1875) and Federal Chancellor (1882–1909).

== Early life and education ==
Ringier was born 8 December 1837 in Sumiswald, Switzerland.

Ringier's father was a reformed pastor who supervised the parish Sumiswald at the time of his birth. In 1843, he was appointed to Huttwil, where Ringier would attend school.

Having spent his youth in Emmental and studied at Aarau, he studied law at the University of Basel, the Ludwig-Maximilians-Universität München, and Heidelberg University. He had to abandon his doctoral studies after the death of his father in 1860 following financial difficulties.

== Career ==
He opened his law firm in Zofingue, and was elected to the cantonal parliament in 1862, serving from 1862 to 1864, and again from 1875 to 1880. He was appointed cantonal government prosecutor in 1863, a position he held for nine years. He was subsequently elected to the Council of States in 1868, where he was considered a moderate liberal. He was President of the Swiss Council of States in 1875.

In 1872, he entered the law firm of his father-in-law in Zofingue. Later, he suffered lung injuries during work as a firefighter that required four years of treatment in Ajaccio, Rigi, and Davos.

In 1881, he was elected on the fourth ballot as Chancellor of the Confederation, replacing Johann Ulrich Schiess. This was the first time since the creation of the Federal Chancellery that several voting rounds were required for the election of the chancellor.

The University of Basel awarded him with an honorary doctorate in 1901. He later served as the president of the Swiss Schiller Foundation (1905–1918).

His cousin Johann Rudolf Ringier served in the National Council.

== Death ==
Ringier died 7 January 1929 in Bern.

Preceded by Alphons Koechlin	President of the Council of States; 1875	Succeeded by Numa Droz
