= Walter Thurnherr =

Swiss politician (born 1963)

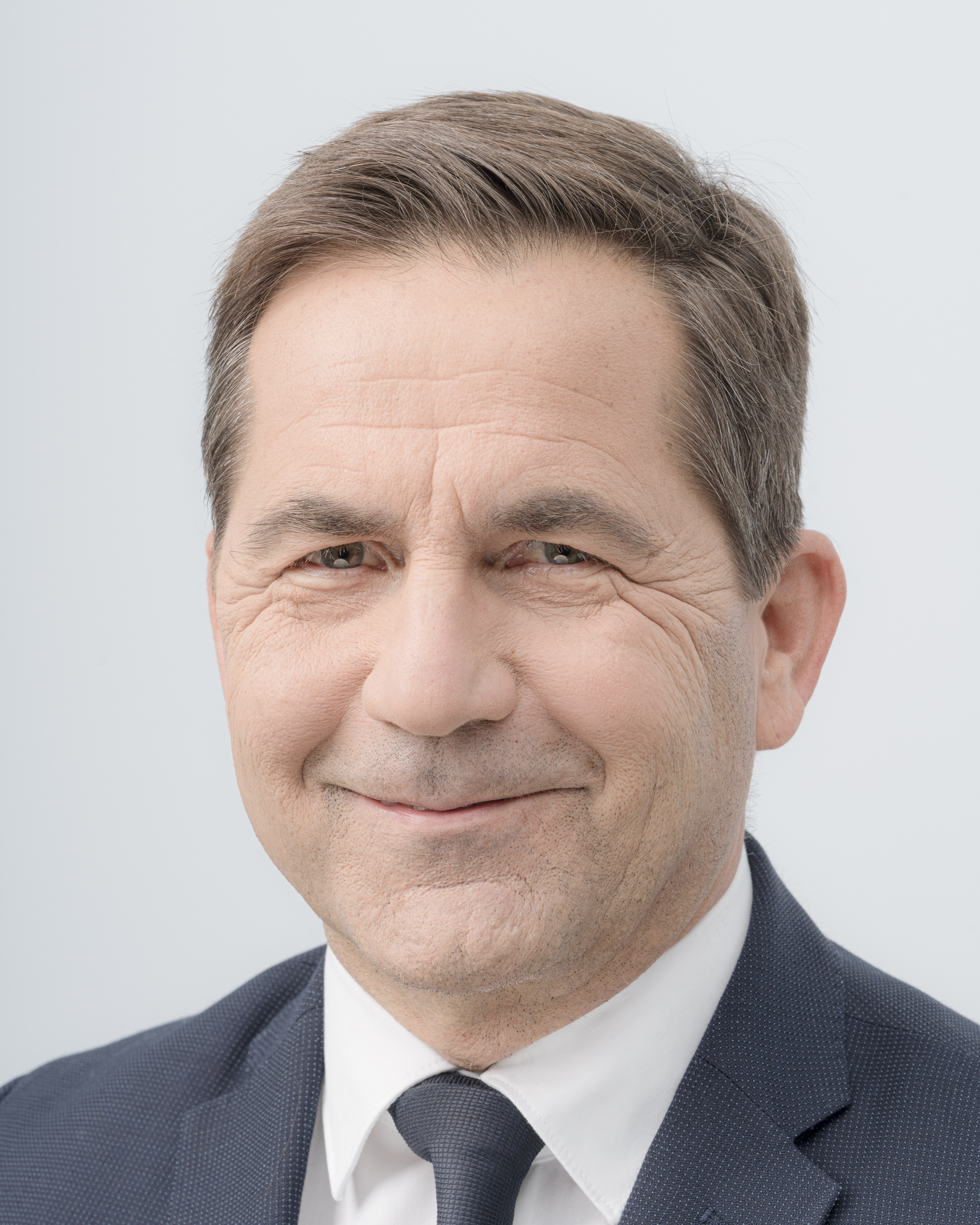
- Official portrait, 2023

16th Chancellor of Switzerland
- In office 1 January 2016 – 31 December 2023
- President: Johann Schneider-Ammann; Doris Leuthard; Alain Berset; Ueli Maurer; Simonetta Sommaruga; Guy Parmelin; Ignazio Cassis; Alain Berset
- Vice-Chancellor: Jörg De Bernardi; Viktor Rossi; André Simonazzi
- Preceded by: Corina Casanova
- Succeeded by: Viktor Rossi

Personal details
- Born: 11 July 1963 (age 63) Muri, Aargau, Switzerland
- Party: Christian Democratic People's Party (before 2021); The Centre (2021–present)
- Children: 2
- Education: ETH Zurich; University of Bern

Walter Thurnherr (born 11 July 1963) is a Swiss government official who served as Chancellor of Switzerland from 2016 to 2023. Although he holds a traditionally nonpartisan office, he was elected as a member of the Christian Democratic People's Party (CVP/PDC). When it merged with the Conservative Democratic Party (BDP/PBD) to form The Centre (DM/LC) in 2021, Thurnherr joined the new party.

On 16 August 2023 he announced that he would leave his position before the end of 2023.

== Biography ==
=== Early life ===
Born in Muri, Aargau, Thurnherr graduated as a physicist at the ETH Zurich in 1987, before studying mathematics at the University of Bern. In 1989, he joined the ranks of Switzerland's diplomatic corps. In 2002, he was appointed chief of staff of the Federal Department of Foreign Affairs under Federal Councillor Joseph Deiss. The following year, he was named chief of staff of the Federal Department of Economic Affairs, first under Pascal Couchepin, then Deiss and finally Doris Leuthard. He followed Leuthard when she took over the Federal Department of Environment, Transport, Energy and Communications in 2011 as her chief of staff.

=== Federal Chancellor ===
He stood for election to succeed Corina Casanova as Chancellor of Switzerland on 9 December 2015, as the first unopposed candidate in 90 years. He was elected by the Swiss Federal Assembly with 230 votes out of 234. He assumed office on 1 January 2016. He was reelected on 11 December 2019 with 219 votes out of 224.

In a 2023 interview, Thurnherr called for Switzerland to become more involved in international matters.

=== Personal life ===
Thurnherr is active on Twitter as of 2023, where he often shares his passion for physics and mathematics. He speaks English, German, French, and learned Russian as a diplomat working in Moscow. He is married and has two children. In his free time he enjoys hiking and reading.

Political offices
Preceded by Corina Casanova	Chancellor of Switzerland; 2016–2023	Succeeded by Viktor Rossi
