= Oskar Leimgruber =

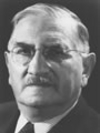

9th Chancellor of Switzerland
- In office 1944–1951
- President: Walther Stampfli; Eduard von Steiger; Karl Kobelt; Philipp Etter; Enrico Celio; Ernst Nobs; Max Petitpierre; Eduard von Steiger
- Preceded by: George Bovet
- Succeeded by: Charles Oser

Personal details
- Born: 5 July 1886 Fribourg, Switzerland
- Died: 19 July 1976 (aged 90) Bern, Switzerland
- Party: Christian Democratic People's Party (CVP)
- Education: University of Fribourg; University of Bern; University of Vienna

Oskar Leimgruber (5 July 1886 – 19 July 1976) was a Swiss lawyer and politician and a member of the Christian Democratic People's Party (CVP). From 1944 to 1951, he served as the 9th Chancellor of Switzerland.

== Biography ==
Leimgruber was born in Fribourg, Switzerland. He studied at several institutions—University of Fribourg, University of Bern, and University of Vienna—obtaining his doctorate in 1911.

During his studies, Leimgruber worked as an editor at La Liberté and Freiburger Zeitung, as well as Secretary of the Trade Association of the Canton of Fribourg.

In 1912, he began working as a lawyer for Swiss Federal Railways. In 1919, he became a member of the Central Committee of the Catholic Conservative Party (CVP) and the Secretary General of the Federal Department of the Postal Services and Railways. Named Vice-Chancellor in 1925, he created the Federal Office for Printing and Materials in 1926. Leimgruber represented Switzerland at numerous international conferences.

In 1923, he founded the International Union of Small and Medium-Sized Enterprises. In 1930, he presided over the Union of International Associations in Brussels. He has written extensively on issues of the economy, administration, sociology and jurisprudence.

In 1934 Leimgruber was defeated by George Bovet in a close election for a new Federal Chancellor. Upon running again in 1941, he was elected as Federal Chancellor. He was the first Chancellor belonging to the Catholic Conservatives. Leimgruber introduced simultaneous translation of speeches in the National Council and the Council of States. For the centenary in 1948, he was the co-editor of the book Emblem, Seals and Constitutions of the Swiss Confederation and the Cantons and Adjusted Collection of Federal Laws and Regulations from 1848 to 1947. He resigned as chancellor in 1951 and died in Bern in 1976.
