= Karl Huber =

Karl Huber may refer to:

- Karl Huber (footballer)
- Karl Huber (politician)
