= Charles Oser =

Swiss politician

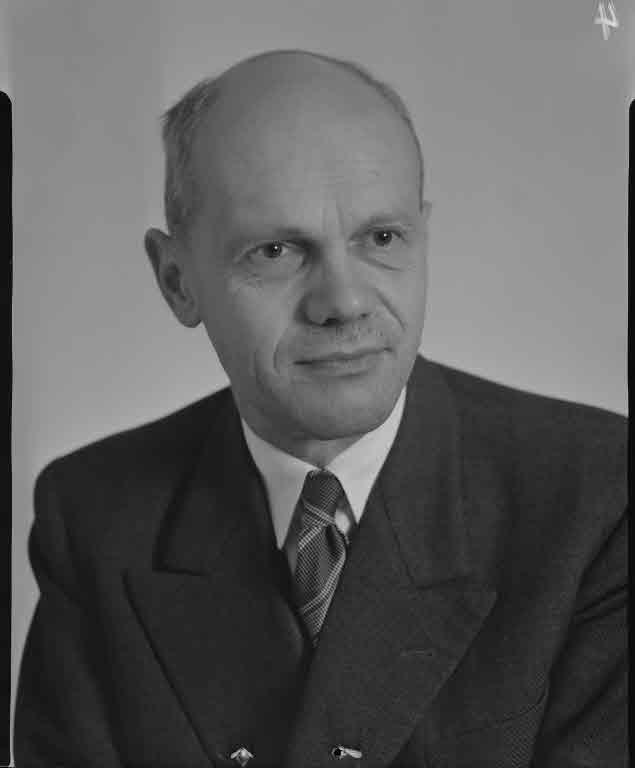

10th Chancellor of Switzerland
- In office 1951–1967
- President: Eduard von Steiger; Karl Kobelt; Philipp Etter; Rodolphe Rubattel; Max Petitpierre; Markus Feldmann; Hans Streuli; Thomas Holenstein; Paul Chaudet; Friedrich Traugott Wahlen; Willy Spühler; Ludwig von Moos; Hans Schaffner; Roger Bonvin
- Preceded by: Oskar Leimgruber
- Succeeded by: Karl Huber

Personal details
- Born: 17 February 1902 Sion, Switzerland
- Died: 29 March 1994 (aged 92) Bern, Switzerland
- Party: Free Democratic Party of Switzerland (FDP)
- Education: University of Lausanne; University of Bern

Charles Oser (17 February 1902 in Sion, Switzerland – 29 March 1994) was a Swiss politician from the Free Democratic Party of Switzerland (FDP).

Though born in Sitten/Sion, Oser originated from a bourgeois francophone family from Basel. He studied at Lausanne before pursuing legal studies at the Universities of Lausanne and Bern, obtaining his doctorate in 1927.

He was employed at the Federal Chancellery and the Senate in 1928 as secretary-translator, later becoming Vice-Chancellor in 1944. In 1951, after the departure of Chancellor Oskar Leimgruber, he was elected Chancellor, defeating the Catholic-Conservative People's Party candidate, Thurgau Chief Justice Joseph Plattner. Oser did not employ a second francophone vice-chancellor while serving as Chancellor, fulfilling the duties himself.

During his mandate, he began the systematic collection of federal law, which was completed in 1974 under Chancellor Karl Huber and has been sustained continuously. Oser resigned in 1967.
