= Corina Casanova =

Swiss politician

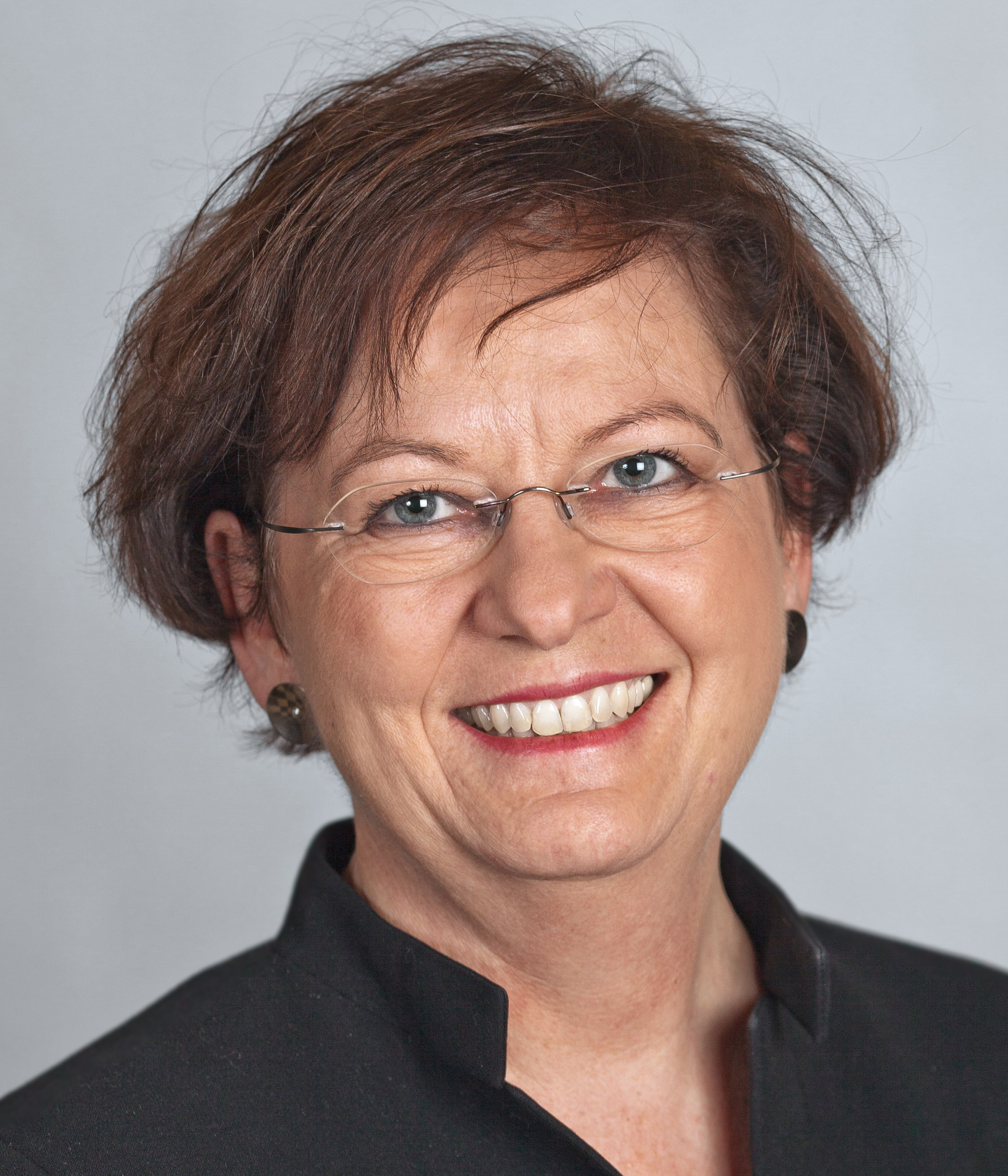

15th Chancellor of Switzerland
- In office 1 January 2008 – 31 December 2015
- President: Pascal Couchepin; Hans-Rudolf Merz; Doris Leuthard; Micheline Calmy-Rey; Eveline Widmer-Schlumpf; Ueli Maurer; Didier Burkhalter; Simonetta Sommaruga
- Vice-Chancellor: Oswald Sigg; Thomas Helbling; André Simonazzi
- Preceded by: Annemarie Huber-Hotz
- Succeeded by: Walter Thurnherr

Vice-Chancellor of Switzerland
- In office 1 August 2005 – 31 December 2007 Serving with Oswald Sigg
- Chancellor: Annemarie Huber-Hotz
- Preceded by: Hanna Muralt Müller
- Succeeded by: Thomas Helbling

Personal details
- Born: 4 January 1956 (age 70) Ilanz, Switzerland
- Party: Christian Democratic People's Party
- Education: University of Fribourg

Corina Casanova (born 4 January 1956) is a Swiss politician who was the Federal Chancellor of Switzerland between 2008 and 2015.

Born in Ilanz, Grisons, Casanova worked as a lawyer in the practice of the former President of the Swiss Federal Supreme Court, Giusep Nay, as well as a Red Cross delegate in South Africa, Angola, Nicaragua and El Salvador. She was also a federal parliamentary official and advisor to Federal Councillors Flavio Cotti and Joseph Deiss, both of the Christian Democratic People's Party.

In August 2005, she was elected to the office of Vice-Chancellor by the Swiss Federal Assembly. In December 2007, that assembly elected her to the office of Chancellor in the course of the 2007 Swiss Federal Council election. In March 2008 she was designated by the Swiss Federal Council member of the directional committee for electronic government in Switzerland.

Casanova is a member of the Christian Democratic People's Party and speaks six languages: Romansh, German, French, Italian, English, and Spanish.

Political offices
Preceded by Hanna Muralt Müller	Vice Chancellor of Switzerland; 2005–2008	Succeeded by Thomas Helbling
Preceded by Annemarie Huber-Hotz	Chancellor of Switzerland; 2008–2015	Succeeded by Walter Thurnherr
