= Citizen legislature =

Type of decision making body

A citizen legislature is a legislative chamber made up primarily of citizens who have a full-time occupation besides being a legislator. Such citizen legislatures can be found on the state level, as in some U.S. states, or on the national level as in Switzerland.

Legislatures in the U.S. considered to be citizen legislatures include Montana, Nevada, Idaho, New Mexico, North Carolina, North Dakota, Oregon, Utah, Virginia and Wyoming.

Many other states in the US, by contrast, have a professional legislature. James Madison wrote in Federalist No. 62 that "It is not possible that an assembly of men called for the most part from pursuits of a private nature, continued in appointment for a short time, and led by no permanent motive to devote intervals of public occupation to a study of the laws, the affairs, and the comprehensive interests of their country, should, if left wholly to themselves, escape a variety of important errors in the exercise of their legislative trust."

== See also ==
- Politics of Switzerland
- Idaho Legislature
- Oregon Legislative Assembly
- Wyoming Legislature
- New Mexico Legislature
- Utah State Legislature
- North Carolina General Assembly
