= Adolf von Steiger =

Swiss politician and lawyer (1859–1925)

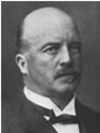

6th Chancellor of Switzerland
- In office 1919–1925
- President: Gustave Ador; Giuseppe Motta; Edmund Schulthess; Robert Haab; Karl Scheurer; Ernest Chuard; Jean-Marie Musy
- Preceded by: Hans Schatzmann
- Succeeded by: Robert Käslin

Personal details
- Born: 25 July 1859 Bern, Switzerland
- Died: 1 March 1925 (aged 65) Bern, Switzerland
- Party: Free Democratic Party of Switzerland (FDP)
- Education: University of Bern; University of Geneva; University of Leipzig

Alfred Armand Adolf von Steiger, commonly known as Adolf von Steiger (25 July 1859 – 1 March 1925) was a Swiss politician from the Free Democratic Party of Switzerland (FDP) and jurist, who served as the sixth Chancellor from 1919 to 1925.

The son of a librarian from an old Bernese patrician family, he studied law at the universities of Bern, Geneva, and Leipzig. From 1884 to 1893 he led a law practice in Bern. After two years as a substitute judge, he was a member of the Bernese court from 1893. In 1900 he was elected as a representative of the Liberals for mayor of Bern. He also served on the Grand Council of the canton of Bern and the Council of States (1908–1918).

In 1918 he was named Vice Chancellor. The following year, the Federal Assembly elected him Chancellor. He stood up to the Catholic conservative Solothurn National Council and Siegfried Hartmann. On taking office he also passed a new law that relieved the Chancellor of the record-keeping duties in the National Council. He died of a stroke in 1925 while in office.
