= Thomas Helbling =

Swiss lawyer and politician

Vice-Chancellor of Switzerland
- In office 1 June 2008 – 31 July 2016
- Preceded by: Corina Casanova
- Succeeded by: Jörg De Bernardi

Personal details
- Born: 1961 (age 64–65) Switzerland
- Party: FDP.The Liberals
- Education: University of Bern; University of London

Thomas Helbling (born 1961) is a Swiss lawyer. He held the office of Vice-Chancellor of Switzerland between 2008 and 2016, in charge of the Federal Council sector. After leaving office, he became the CEO of the Swiss Insurance Association (2017-2021).

A native of Bern, Thomas Helbling studied law at the University of Bern and holds a Master of Laws from the University of London. After spending his early career as a lawyer in Bern and London, he entered public service in 1998, when he became advisor to Federal Councillor Adolf Ogi and his successor, Samuel Schmid.

In 2001, Helbling became the project manager for the joint Austrian-Swiss bid to host the UEFA Euro 2008 football championship, the second such multinational joint bid to succeed so far. After retiring from the organization committee in early 2003, Helbling joined private insurance company Swiss Life as head of public relations, and was appointed board member of the Swiss Football League, where he was in charge of games security and pushed for restrictive legislation against hooliganism in anticipation of the Euro.

Thomas Helbling was appointed Vice Chancellor of the Swiss Confederation in February 2008 and took office on 1 June 2008, successor to Corina Casanova who had been named Chancellor in the meantime. Although there had been several rows tied language representation in the Federal Chancellery during the appointment of his predecessors - Swiss French politicians having complained that the chancellery was in purely Swiss-German hands after the nomination of both Corina Casanova and Oswald Sigg. Swiss-German Helbling's appointment, raised no such issues.

In his role, Thomas Helbling oversaw the Federal Council sector of the Swiss Chancellery, which looks after planning and managing the Federal Council's meetings, the Legal Section, the Official Publications Center and the Central Language Services.

Political offices
| Preceded by Corina Casanova | Vice-Chancellor of Switzerland; 2008–2016 | Succeeded by Jörg De Bernardi |
