= Freedom of Information Act (Switzerland) =

Information access law

Freedom of Information Act (FoIA)
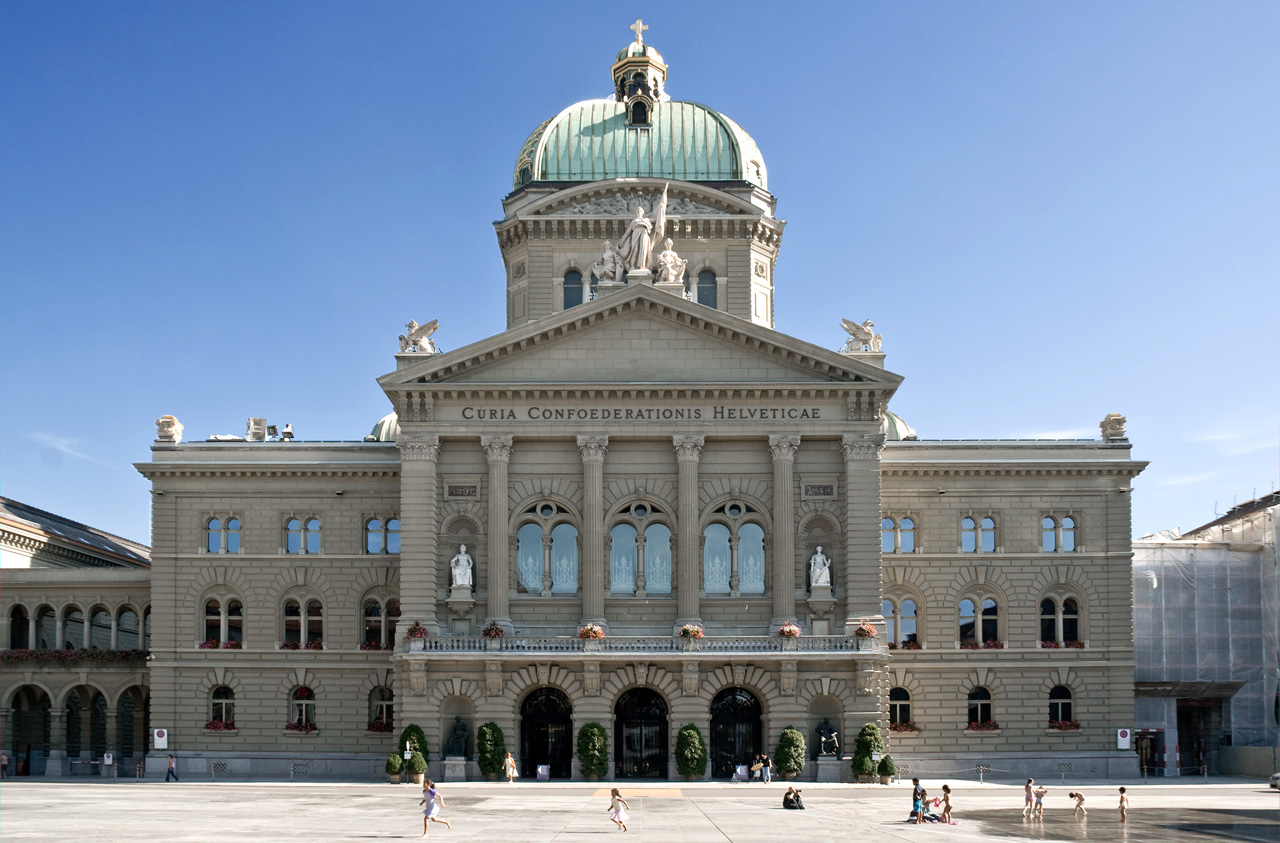

Federal Assembly of Switzerland
- Long title: Federal Act on Freedom of Information in the Administration (SR 152.3)
- Territorial extent: Switzerland
- Enacted by: Federal Assembly of Switzerland
- Enacted: 17 December 2004
- Commenced: 1 July 2006
- Status: Current legislation

The Freedom of Information Act (FoIA) (Note: German: Öffentlichkeitsgesetz, BGÖ; French: Loi sur la transparence, LTrans; Italian: Legge sulla trasparenza, LTras) is a Swiss federal law that guarantees the right of access to information held by federal authorities in Switzerland. It was adopted on 17 December 2004 by the Federal Assembly and came into force on 1 July 2006.

Under the law, anyone, regardless of nationality or residence, can request information held by federal authorities. The requested information must be related to the activities of federal authorities and be in a form that is readily available.

Access to documents at the cantonal level is governed by cantonal laws, which are mostly similar to the federal law. As of 2018, the cantons of Appenzell Innerrhoden, Glarus, Lucerne, Nidwalden, Obwalden and Thurgau do not have freedom of information legislation.

Prior to the introduction of the law, the activities of the federal administration was in principle secret. A right of access to official documents was only granted in very specific cases.

== Exceptions and restrictions ==
The law excludes requests for "official documents relating to civil proceedings, criminal proceedings, international mutual and administrative assistance proceedings, international dispute settlement proceedings, constitutional and administrative judicial proceedings, or arbitration proceedings" (art. 3 para. 1).

Additionally, access may be refused if the privacy of third parties may be violated or if the security of Switzerland may be jeopardized (art. 7).

== Enforcement ==
The law is enforced by the Federal Data Protection and Information Commissioner (FDPIC), who is responsible for overseeing the implementation of the law and investigating complaints of violations.

Requests for information can be made verbally (by phone or on site) or in writing (by email, fax or letter) and do not require any justification. Requests are generally subject to a fee, which are waived if under 100 CHF.

If the request is denied, individuals have the right to appeal to the Federal Administrative Court. The Court will review the decision and may order federal authorities to release the requested information.
