= Schatzman =

Schatzman is a surname. Notable people with the surname include:

- Evry Schatzman (1920–2010), French astrophysicist
- Marv Schatzman (1927–2006), American basketball player
- Michelle Schatzman (1949–2010), French mathematician

== See also ==
- Schatzmann
