= Vice-Chancellor of Switzerland =

Swiss political position

The vice-chancellor of Switzerland was initially named Federal Secretary (Bundesschreiber). The title of the Vice-Chancellor was established in 1851, first as Federal Chancellor Deputy, then formally as Vice-Chancellor in 1881. In order to provide a balance between languages and geographical representation, it became custom since 1895 to name a second vice-chancellor from a French-speaking canton if both the chancellor and vice-chancellor were Swiss-German. The second vice-chancellor became a permanent position in 1967.

Unlike the federal chancellor, vice-chancellors are appointed by the Federal Council directly.

After both vice-chancellors retired in 2005, a row erupted over language representation when Oswald Sigg was named successor to Vice-Chancellor and Federal Council spokesman Achille Casanova. With Federal Chancellor Annemarie Huber-Hotz and the other Vice-Chancellorship conferred to Corina Casanova (no relationship to Achille Casanova), the three key roles in the Federal Chancellery were held by Swiss Germans. Remarkably enough, though, when Corinna Casanova was elected Federal Chancellor three years later, the nomination of Thomas Helbling as her successor, another Swiss German, raised no such public criticism. At the time, the Tages-Anzeiger speculated that this might be due to the Latin cantons aiming for the post of Oswald Sigg, due to retire a bit later. Whether founded or not, the appointment of André Simonazzi in 2009 did indeed restore the language balance.

In May 2024, following the sudden passing of Vice-Chancellor André Simonazzi, the Federal Council appointed Ursula Eggenberger ad interim while searching for a permanent successor. Andrea Arcidiacono took over the post of Vice-Chancellor and spokesperson of the Federal Council in October 2024, but resigned shortly after and left his post on March 31, 2025, with Ursula Eggenberger reprising the role ad interim for a second time.
