= Numa Droz =

Swiss politician (1844–1899)

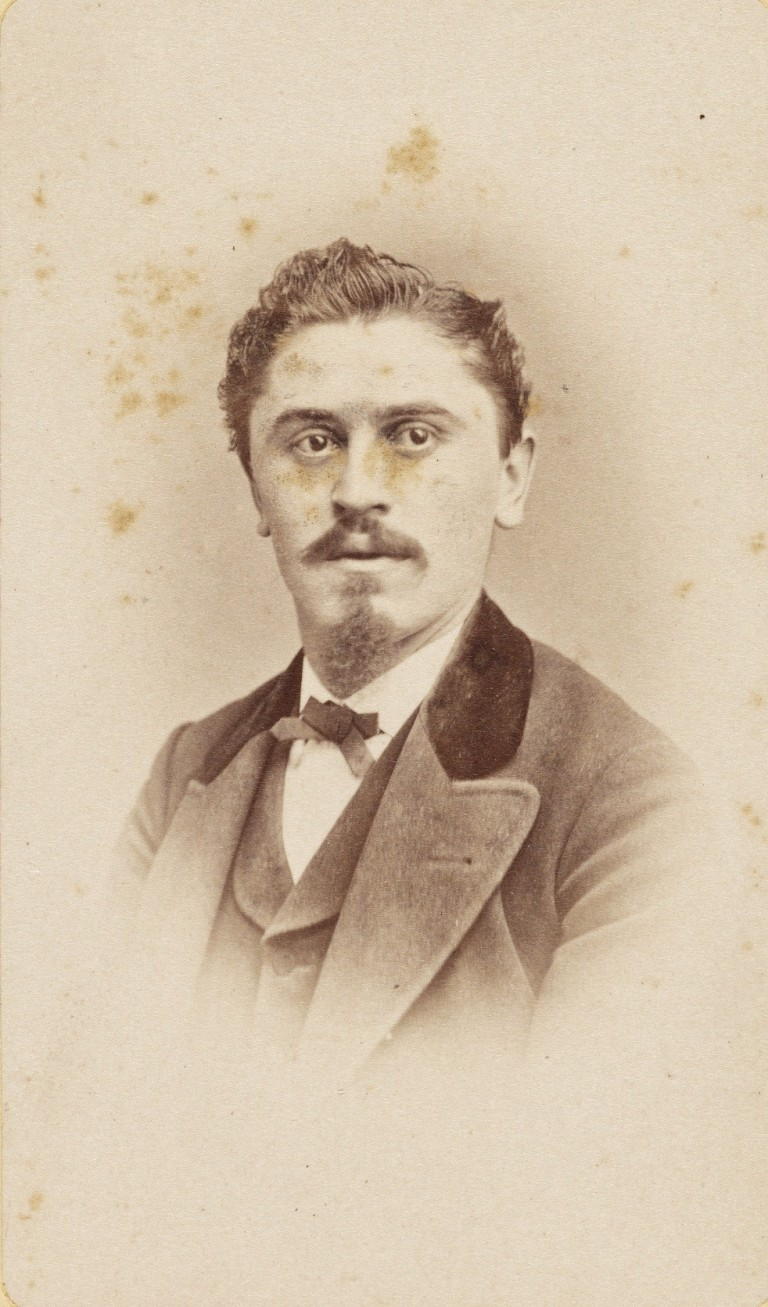
Numa Droz

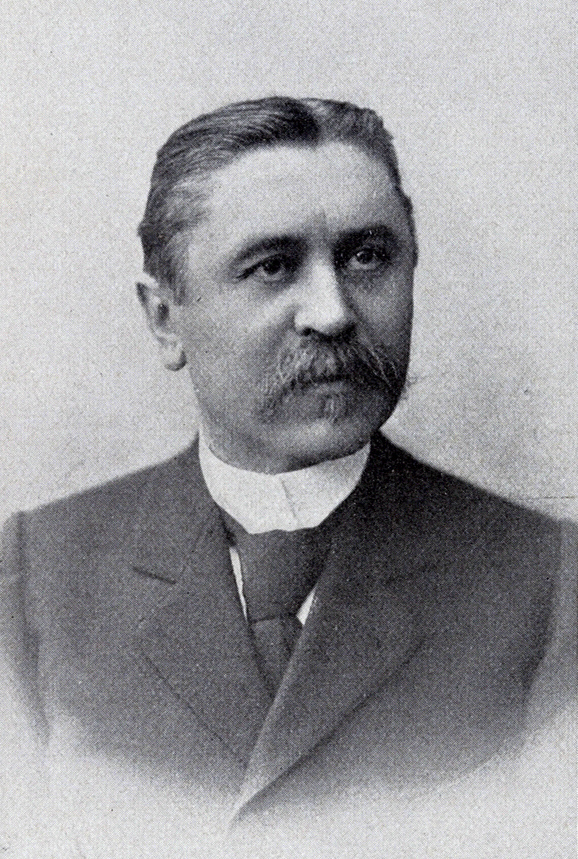
Numa Droz

Numa Droz (27 January 1844 – 15 December 1899) was a Swiss politician and member of the Swiss Federal Council (1875–1892). Born in La Chaux-de-Fonds, he was elected to cantonal government of Neuchâtel in 1871 and to the Swiss Council of States in 1872.

On 18 December 1875, he was elected to the Swiss Federal Council (becoming the youngest Federal Councillor ever at age 31) and handed over office on 31 December 1892. He was affiliated to the Free Democratic Party of Switzerland. He was elected President of Switzerland in 1881 and 1887. In 1887, he was considered as a potential civil governor of Crete but he declined.

During his office time he held the following departments:

- Department of Home Affairs (1876–1878)
- Department of Trade and Agriculture (1879–1880)
- Political Department as President of the Confederation (1881)
- Department of Trade and Agriculture (1882–1886)
- Political Department as President of the Confederation (1887)
- Department of Foreign Affairs (1888–1892)

Droz has been described as a "man of progress" and "one of Switzerland's major political figures". He was appointed by Swiss Government for presiding the ALAI conferences following of which the Berne Convention for the protection of literary and artistic works was concluded in 1886. "Numa Droz was an admirable choice for this role from the point of view of authors, as he had a strong interest in copyright matters, and had, in an article ... declared himself in favour of an international convention on literary and artistic property." He was to play a crucial role in the realization of the final convention. In 1898, he suggested a railway over the Bernina Pass which eventually was to be completed after his death.

He was a radical democrat who clashed with Bismarck over a police spying case, the Wohlgemuth Affair, in 1889. He died in Bern in 1899.

In La Chaux-de-Fonds a street (rue Numa-Droz, the longest in the town) and in Neuchâtel a square (place Numa-Droz) are named after him. A statue by Charles l'Eplattenier which was erected by the station is at present being renovated and will be placed on Rue Numa-Droz in the autumn of 2012.

== Works ==
- Numa Droz, Souvenirs d'un vieux montagnard. Histoire d'un proscrit de 1793. Nouvelle neuchâteloise, La Chaux-de-Fonds, Imprimerie du National suisse, 1869
- Numa Droz, Instruction civique : manuel à l'usage des écoles primaires supérieures, des écoles secondaires, des écoles complémentaires et des jeunes citoyens, Lausanne, D. Lebet, 1884
- Numa Droz, Études et portraits politiques, C. Eggimann (Genève), F. Alcan (Paris), 1895
- Numa Droz, Le rachat des chemins de fer suisses, Bâle et Genève, Georg, 1898
- Numa Droz, Essais économiques, Genève, C. Eggimann, 1906

== Archive sources ==
The Numa Droz collection is conserved in the State Archives of Neuchâtel. It contains documents about his privacy and documents of different fields of research.

- Droz, Numa, Fonds: Numa Droz (1868–1899). Archives de l'État de Neuchâtel.

Political offices
Preceded by Gottlieb Ringier	President of the Council of States; 1875	Succeeded by Johann Jakob Sulzer
Preceded by Paul Cérésole	Member of the Swiss Federal Council; 1875–1892	Succeeded by Adrien Lachenal
