= André Simonazzi =

Swiss politician (1968–2024)

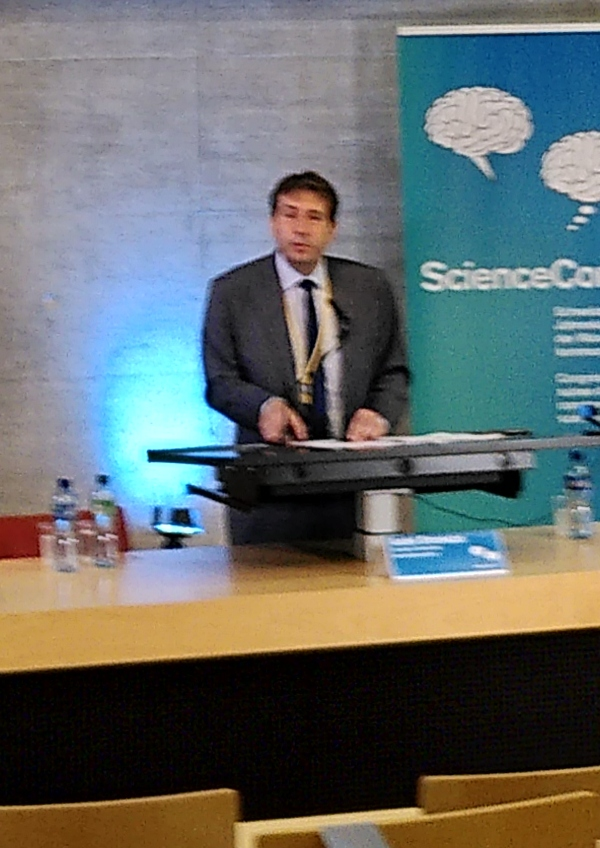

Vice-Chancellor of Switzerland
- In office 1 April 2009 – 10 May 2024 Serving with Thomas Helbling (2009–2016), Jörg De Bernardi (2016–2019), Viktor Rossi (2019–2023)
- Chancellor: Corina Casanova; Walter Thurnherr; Viktor Rossi
- Preceded by: Oswald Sigg
- Succeeded by: Ursula Eggenberger (ad interim); Andrea Arcidiacono

Personal details
- Born: 17 November 1968 Monthey, Switzerland
- Died: 10 May 2024 (aged 55) Valais, Switzerland

André Simonazzi (17 November 1968 – 10 May 2024) was a Swiss journalist born in Monthey. He held the office of Vice-Chancellor and spokesman for the Swiss Federal Council, from April 2009 until his death in 2024.

== Life and career ==
Simonazzi was born on 17 November 1968. He attended the Collège de l’Abbaye in St. Maurice, where he obtained a Latin and English baccalaureate in 1988.

The eldest son of an economics teacher at the St. Maurice's Abbey, Simonazzi graduated at the Graduate Institute of International Studies in Geneva. After beginning a career as a journalist at the regional newspaper Le Nouvelliste, Simonazzi first joined the relief organization Caritas Switzerland's media department, before becoming its national spokesperson in 1998.

In 2004, he joined the Federal Department of Environment, Transport, Energy and Communications (DETEC), initially as deputy head of the information service, then as head between 2004 and 2009.

Simonazzi was appointed spokesman for the Swiss federal council on 12 November 2008, a position he took up on 1 April 2009 and retained until his death in 2024.

== Personal life and death ==
Simonazzi was of Italian descent. He was married. The marriage produced three children.

Simonazzi collapsed and died while hiking in the Swiss mountains on 10 May 2024, aged 55.

Political offices
Preceded by Oswald Sigg	Vice-Chancellor of Switzerland; 2009–2024	Succeeded by Ursula Eggenberger (ad interim)
