= Karl Huber (politician) =

11th Chancellor of Switzerland
- In office 1968–1981
- President: Willy Spühler; Ludwig von Moos; Hans-Peter Tschudi; Rudolf Gnägi; Nello Celio; Roger Bonvin; Ernst Brugger; Pierre Graber; Kurt Furgler; Willi Ritschard; Hans Hürlimann; Georges-André Chevallaz
- Deputy: Walter Buser
- Preceded by: Charles Oser
- Succeeded by: Walter Buser

Personal details
- Born: 18 October 1915 Saint-Gall, Switzerland
- Died: 16 September 2002 (aged 86) Bern, Switzerland
- Education: University of Bern

Karl Huber (18 October 1915 in Canton of St. Gallen, Switzerland – 16 September 2002) was a Swiss politician and civil servant. He was a member of the Christian Democratic People's Party of Switzerland (CVP).

After finishing his studies at Saint-Gall, he pursued legal studies at the University of Bern, where he obtained his doctorate in 1939. In 1941, he became a legal collaborator with the Department of the Economy. In 1954, he was named to the general secretariat of the federal Department of the Economy, where he served from 1957 until 1967.

In 1967, he was elected Chancellor of the Confederation. The "magic formula" was applicable for the first time to the Chancellery as his Vice-Chancellors included the radical Jean-Marc Sauvant and the socialist Walter Buser.

Following his appointment, Huber reduced and streamlined the Council's decision-making process. He standardised the presentation of files, prescribed rules for presenting legislation, developed the first guidelines for the upcoming parliamentary term, and advocated seeking consensual solutions among the four government parties. These reforms were formalized in the 1978 law on the organization of the administration. Political rights are condensed into a single law approved by referendum on 4 December 1977.

Huber retired in 1981, after which the University of Fribourg awarded him an honorary doctorate.
