= Achille Casanova =

Swiss politician (1941–2016)

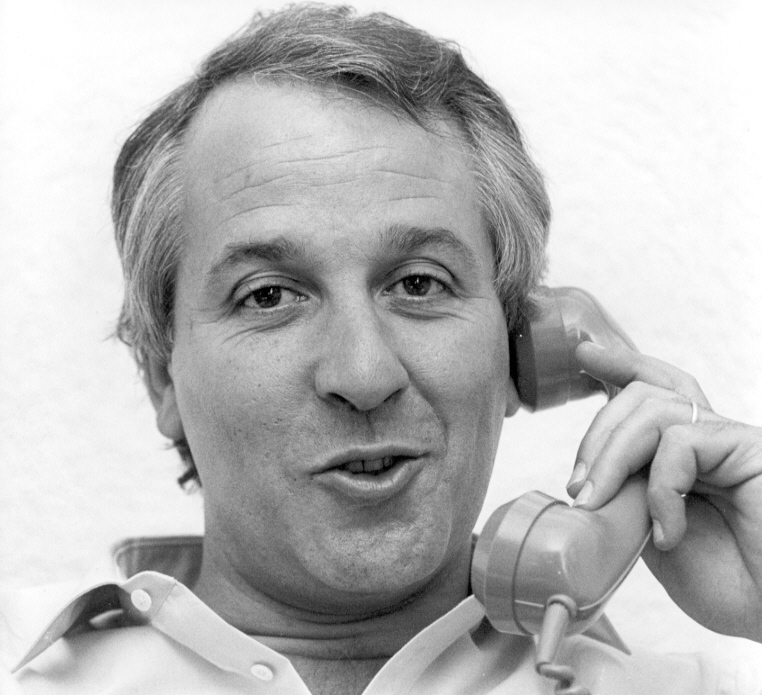

Vice-Chancellor of Switzerland
- In office July 1981 – 31 July 2005
- Succeeded by: Oswald Sigg

Personal details
- Born: 2 October 1941 Switzerland
- Died: 17 July 2016 (aged 74) Bern, Switzerland

Achille Casanova (2 October 1941 – 17 July 2016) was a Swiss journalist and politician. He held the office of Vice-Chancellor of Switzerland between 1981 and 2005, and during this time became the first official spokesman for the Swiss Federal Council when that role was created on 1 September 2000.

== Early life and education ==
Born in Zürich in 1941 but originating from the Italian-speaking canton Ticino, he first attended school in Lugano, before studying political science at the universities of Bern and Fribourg. He began working as a journalist for the national press agency of Switzerland, before joining the Swiss Italian Television RSI in 1966.

== Career ==
During his tenure, Achille Casanova worked with 26 different Federal Councillors (out of 108 ever elected by the time of his resignation), participated in over 1180 Federal Council sessions, and officiated under three different Chancellors. While he was a candidate for the office twice himself, the Swiss Federal Assembly elected other candidates every time.

Fluent in German, French, Italian and English, his resignation sparked a minor row over language representation within the Swiss Federal government, when his successor, Oswald Sigg, was named over several candidates from Swiss-French and Swiss-Italian regions. This was compounded by the fact that his office (the second Vice-chancellor, in charge of the Information & Communication sector) had initially been created in 1895 on an ad hoc basis, to add a senior representative of the French and Italian speaking regions when both the Chancellor and the other Vice-chancellors came from German-speaking cantons.

After retiring from office in 2005, he joined the Swiss Broadcasting Corporation SRG as its Ombudsman. In January 2006, he was appointed Chairman of the International Balzan Prize Foundation.

== Personal life ==
Casanova was married and a father to two grown-up children. Casanova died on 17 July 2016 after a serious illness. He was 74 years old.

Political offices
Preceded by François Couchepin	Vice-Chancellor of Switzerland; 1981–2005	Succeeded by Oswald Sigg
