= Jörg De Bernardi =

Swiss diplomat and politician

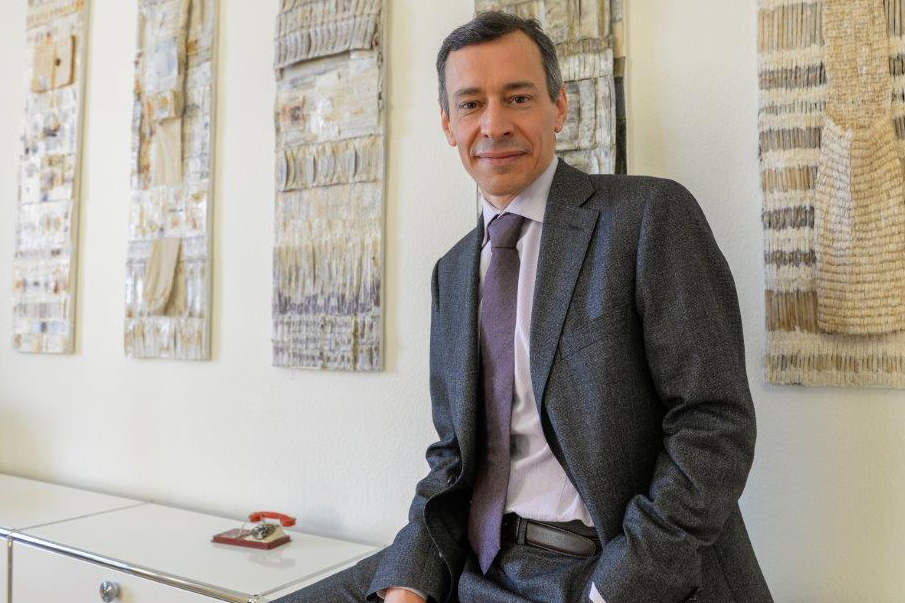
- Portrait of Jörg De Bernardi

Vice-Chancellor of Switzerland
- In office 1 August 2016 – 30 April 2019
- Preceded by: Thomas Helbling
- Succeeded by: Viktor Rossi

Personal details
- Born: September 13, 1973 (age 52) Pfäffikon SZ
- Party: Social Democratic Party
- Education: University of Neuchâtel; University of Zürich

Jörg De Bernardi (born September 13, 1973) is a Swiss diplomat and politician. He held the office of Vice-Chancellor of Switzerland between August 2016 and December 2018 and is currently serving as acting Vice-Chancellor, in charge of the Federal Council's affairs.

After growing up in the Canton of Ticino, De Bernardi graduated at the faculty of Theology at the University of Neuchâtel in 1998, and followed up with a master's degree in Applied Ethics at the University of Zürich in 2002. He joined the diplomatic service of the Swiss Federal Department of Foreign Affairs in 2003, and was stationed in Bern and Addis Ababa. Between 2008 and 2011, he worked within the WTO section of the Federal Department of Economic Affairs, Education and Research.

In March 2011, the Canton of Ticino named De Bernardi their delegate for relations with the Federal Government. The Federal Council named him Vice-Chancellor of Switzerland on 5 June 2016, as the successor to Thomas Helbling. He held the office since August that same year, and was in charge of managing the Federal Councils' meetings, as well as seven organizational units within the Federal Chancellery. De Bernardi was the first representative of the Canton of Ticino within the Federal Government in 17 years, since Flavio Cotti's retirement. In August 2018, he announced his resignation from the post for April 2019, citing family reasons, but continues working within the Federal Chancellery in a different capacity.

Following his successor Viktor Rossi's election to the office of Chancellor, the Federal Council recalled him to his post ad interim while searching for a new Vice-Chancellor. In July 2024, Rachel Salzmann succeeded De Bernardi as Vice-Chancellor overseeing the Federal Council sector.

Political offices
Preceded by Thomas Helbling	Vice-Chancellor of Switzerland; 2016-2019	Succeeded by Viktor Rossi
