= Viktor Rossi =

Chancellor of Switzerland since 2024

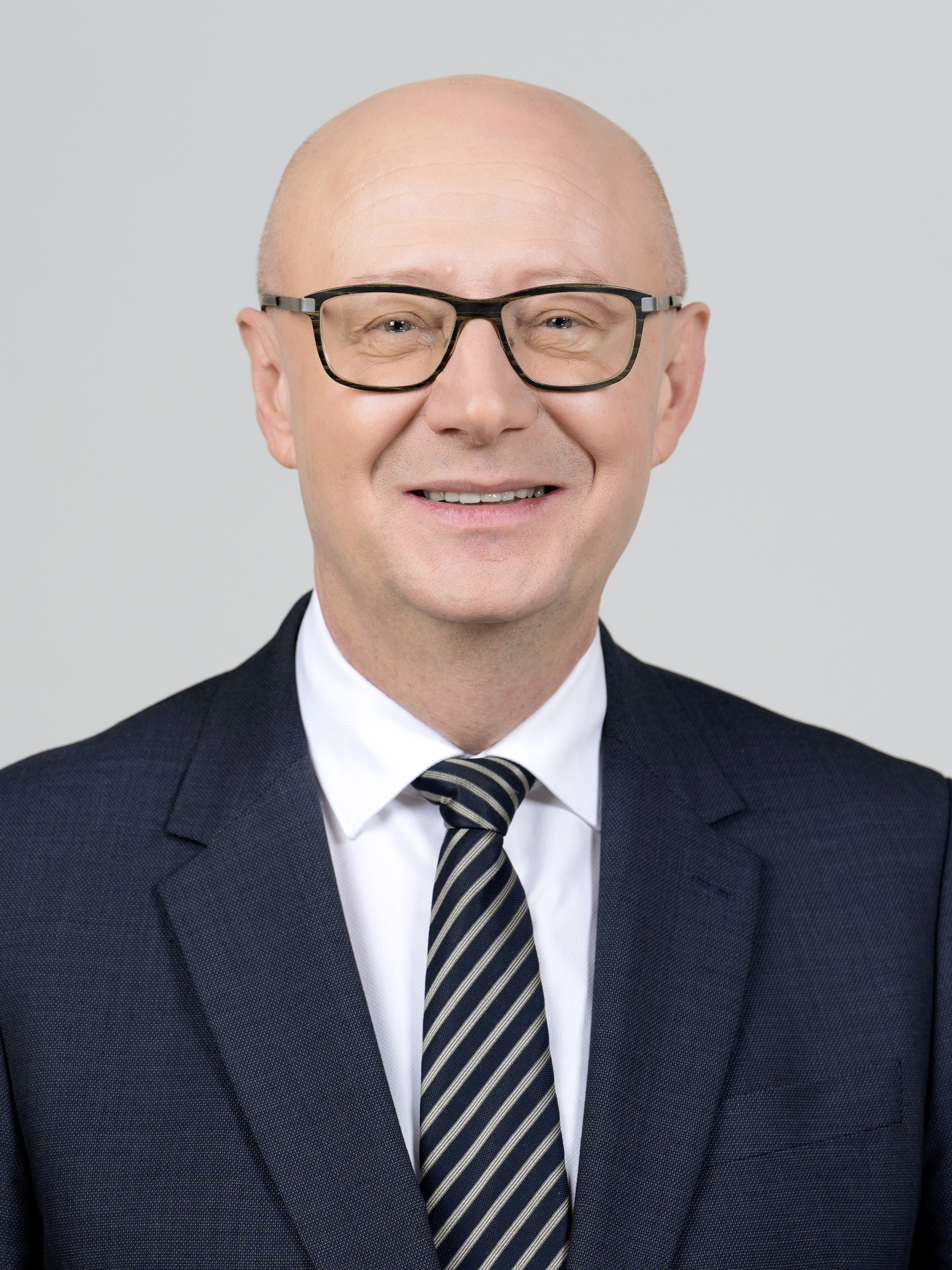
- Official portrait, 2026

17th Chancellor of Switzerland
- Incumbent
- Assumed office 1 January 2024
- President: Viola Amherd; Karin Keller-Sutter; Guy Parmelin
- Vice-Chancellor: André Simonazzi; Jörg De Bernardi (ad interim); Rachel Salzmann
- Preceded by: Walter Thurnherr

Vice-Chancellor of Switzerland
- In office 1 May 2019 – 31 December 2023 Serving with André Simonazzi
- Chancellor: Walter Thurnherr
- Preceded by: Jörg De Bernardi
- Succeeded by: Jörg De Bernardi (ad interim); Rachel Salzmann

Personal details
- Born: 31 October 1968 (age 57) Bern, Switzerland
- Party: Green Liberal Party
- Children: 2
- Education: University of Bern

Viktor Rossi (born 31 October 1968) is a Swiss politician and civil servant. A member of the Green Liberal Party, he became Vice-Chancellor of Switzerland on 1 May 2019. On 13 December 2023, he was elected Federal Chancellor of Switzerland, succeeding Walter Thurnherr, and took office on 1 January 2024.

== Biography ==
Rossi attended primary and secondary school in the Canton of Bern, apprenticed as a cook between 1984 and 1987, obtained a maturity diploma in economics at the Private school Humboldtianum in Bern, before attaining a teacher's degree in Law and Economics at Bern University in 1996.

After graduating, he started teaching Trade at the commercial school (BFB) in Biel, before leading the school in 1999. In parallel, he was at first vice-president of the conference of rectors of commercial schools in the Canton Bern between 2004 and 2009, then president in 2009. In 2015, he completed a diploma of Advanced Studies in Law at Bern University.

Rossi joined the Federal Chancellery of Switzerland in October 2010, leading the Records Management and Logistics department. In 2015, he was Federal Chancellor Walter Thurnherr's delegate supervisor for the IT project GENOVA. In December 2018, the Federal Council elected Rossi Vice-Chancellor of Switzerland.

He took office on 1 May 2019 and has been leading the Federal Council's affairs. He entered the race to succeed Walter Thurnherr at the end of 2023 to fill the position of Chancellor of the Confederation. He was elected on 13 December. His predecessor, Jörg De Bernardi, took over his post ad interim.

Rossi is a native German and Italian speaker. He is married and a father of two.

Political offices
Preceded by Jörg De Bernardi	Vice-Chancellor of Switzerland; 2019–2023	Succeeded by Jörg De Bernardi (ad interim)
Preceded by Walter Thurnherr	Chancellor of Switzerland; 2024–present	Incumbent
