= Annemarie Huber-Hotz =

Swiss politician (1948–2019)

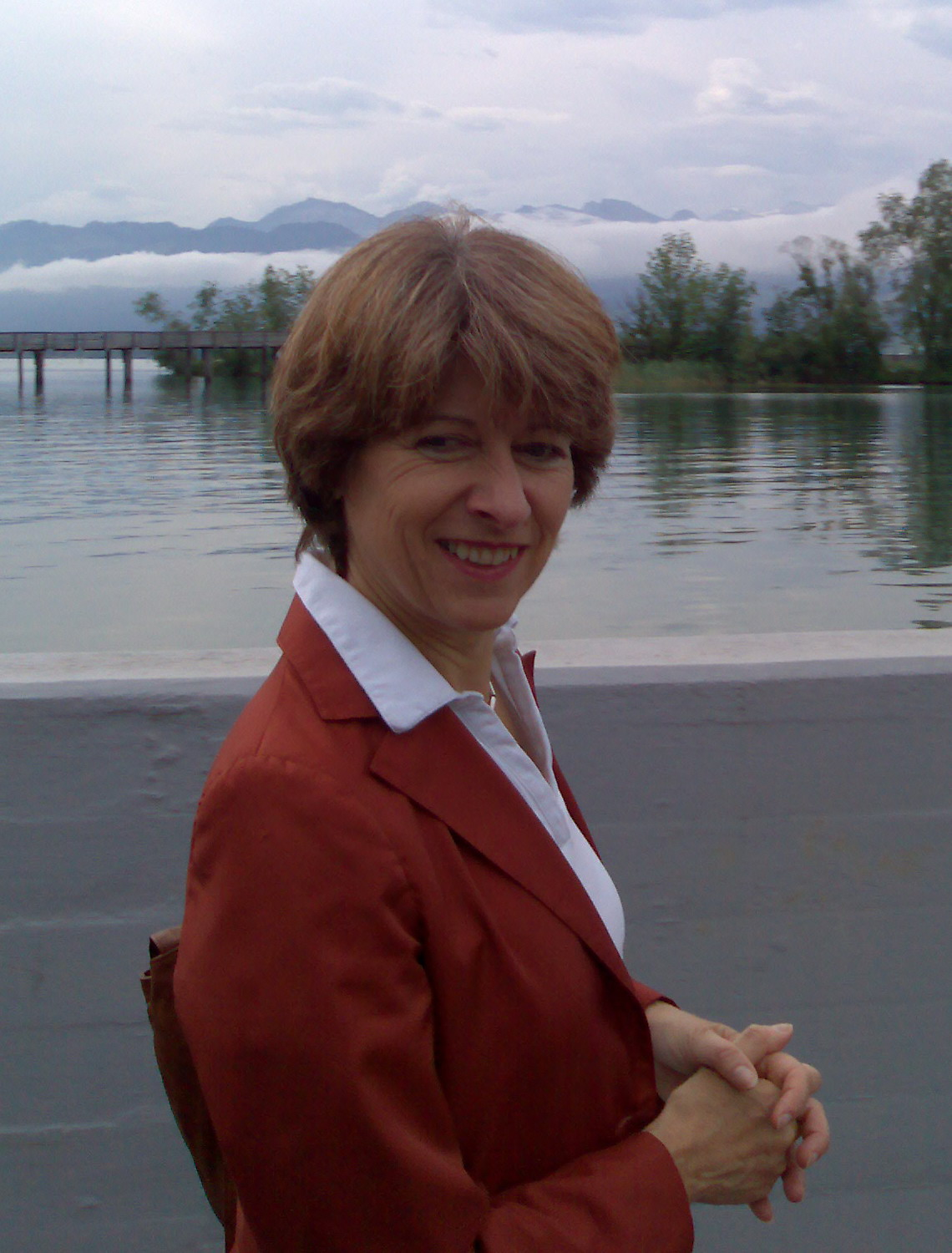

14th Chancellor of Switzerland
- In office 1 January 2000 – 31 December 2007
- President: Adolf Ogi; Moritz Leuenberger; Kaspar Villiger; Pascal Couchepin; Joseph Deiss; Samuel Schmid; Moritz Leuenberger; Micheline Calmy-Rey
- Deputy: Oswald Sigg; Corina Casanova
- Preceded by: François Couchepin
- Succeeded by: Corina Casanova

Personal details
- Born: 16 August 1948 Baar, Switzerland
- Died: 1 August 2019 (aged 70) Fribourg, Switzerland
- Party: Free Democratic Party
- Children: 3
- Education: University of Bern; Uppsala University; Graduate Institute of International Studies

Annemarie Huber-Hotz (16 August 1948 – 1 August 2019) was a Swiss politician who served as the Federal Chancellor of Switzerland between 2000 and 2007. She was nominated by the FDP for the office, and elected to it on 15 December 1999. In 2011, she became President of the Swiss Red Cross and ex officio vice-president of the IFRC.

== Biography ==
Born in Baar, Zug, Huber-Hotz attended primary and secondary school in Baar, and the Gymnasium of Zug. She then studied sociology, ethnology and political science at the Universities of Bern, Uppsala (Sweden) and at the Graduate Institute of International Studies in Geneva and participated in various professional activities. She undertook advanced studies at ETH in Zürich in spatial planning.

She held the following positions:

- 1976-1977: Studied spatial planning in Zug canton
- 1978-1981: Worked for the General Secretariat of the Swiss Parliament, in the press service
- 1981-1992: Worked for the secretariat of the Swiss Council of States
- 1989-1992: Director of the scientific parliamentary service
- 1992-1999: General Secretary of the Swiss Parliament
- 2000-2007: Federal Chancellor
- 2011- 2019: President, Swiss Red Cross

The Federal Chancellery, with about 180 workers, performs administrative functions relating to the co-ordination of the Swiss Federal government and the work of the Swiss Federal Council. The Chancellor is assisted by Vice-Chancellors and attends meetings of the Federal Council but does not vote. Huber-Hotz did not stand for reelection in December 2007 (after the general election), and was succeeded by Corina Casanova on 1 January 2008.

Huber-Hotz was married and had three children. She spoke English, French and Swedish in addition to German and Swiss German. Huber-Hotz died on 1 August 2019 at the age of 70 from a heart attack.

Political offices
Preceded by François Couchepin	Chancellor of Switzerland; 2000–2007	Succeeded by Corina Casanova
