= Chancellor of Switzerland =

Head of the Federal Chancellery of Switzerland

Federal Chancellor of Switzerland
- Bundeskanzler der Schweiz (German); Chancelier fédéral de la Suisse (French); Cancelliere federale della Svizzera (Italian); Chancelier federal da la Svizra (Romansh)

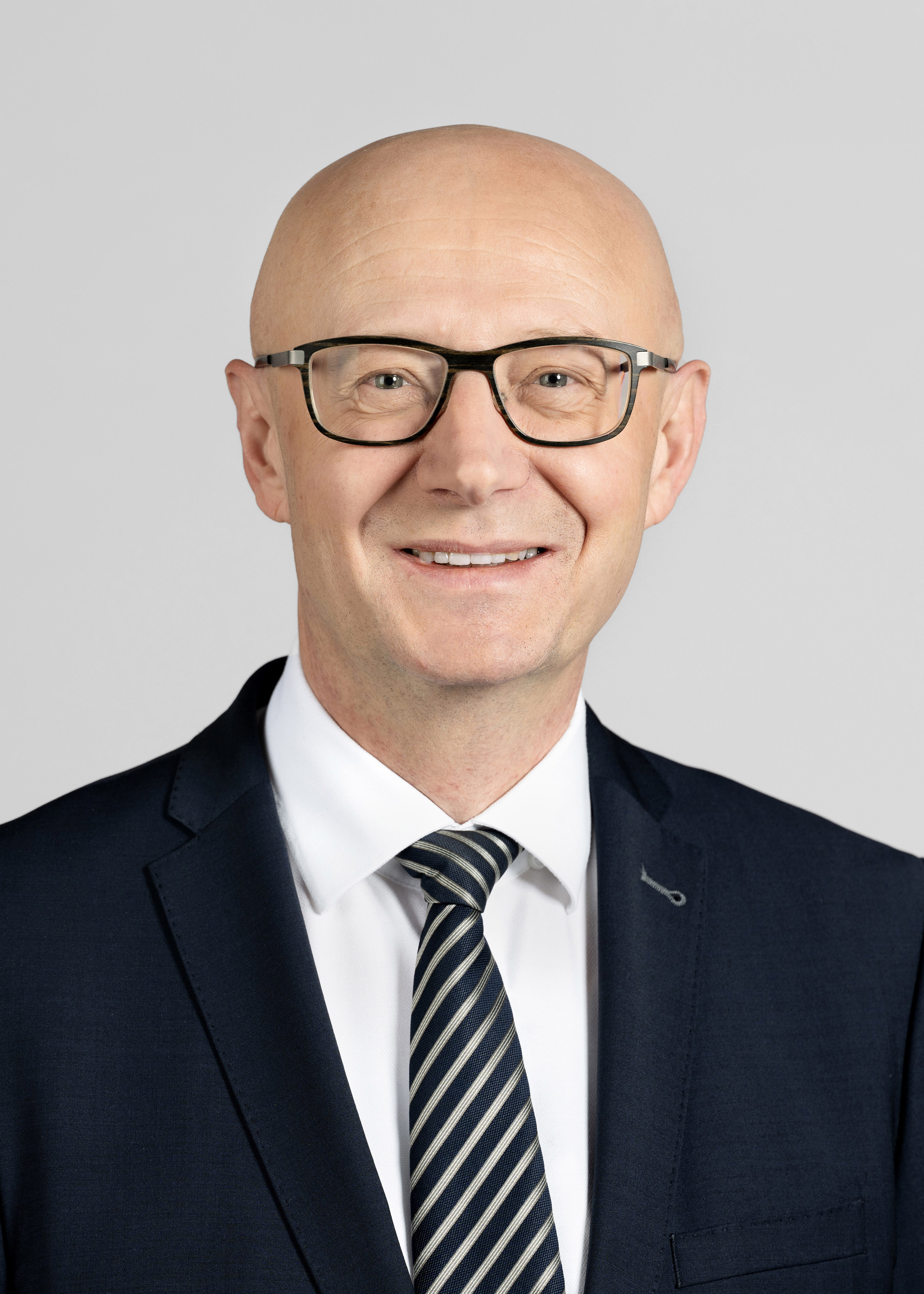
- Incumbent; Viktor Rossi since 1 January 2024
- Federal Chancellery of Switzerland
- Member of: Federal Council
- Residence: Federal Palace
- Appointer: Federal Assembly
- Term length: Four years, renewable
- Inaugural holder: Jean-Marc Mousson
- Formation: 1803; 223 years ago
- Website: www.bk.admin.ch

The federal chancellor is the head of the Federal Chancellery of Switzerland, the oldest Swiss federal institution, established at the initiative of Napoleon in 1803. The officeholder acts as the general staff of the seven-member Federal Council. The chancellor is not a member of the government and the office is not at all comparable to that of the chancellor of Germany or the chancellor of Austria, or to the United Kingdom's chancellor of the exchequer.

The current chancellor, Viktor Rossi, a member of the Green Liberal Party from Bern, was elected on 13 December 2023. He began his term on 1 January 2024.

== Election ==
The federal chancellor is elected for a four-year term by both chambers of the Federal Assembly, assembled together, at the same time (and by the same process) as it elects the Federal Council. The election is conducted by secret ballot using an exhaustive ballot in which each member of the Assembly can vote for any eligible person in the first two rounds, but only remaining candidates in subsequent rounds. If no candidate receives an absolute majority, the candidate(s) with the fewest votes is eliminated.

== Vice-chancellors ==
One or two vice-chancellors are also appointed. In contrast to the chancellor, they are appointed directly by the Federal Council. Prior to 1852, the position was called the state secretary of the Confederation. Currently, Rachel Salzmann is the vice-chancellor in charge of the Federal Council's agenda.

In May 2024, following the sudden death of Vice-Chancellor André Simonazzi, the Federal Council appointed Ursula Eggenberger ad interim while searching for a permanent successor. Andrea Arcidiacono took over the post of Vice-Chancellor and spokesperson of the Federal Council in October 2024, but resigned shortly after and left his post on March 31, 2025, with Ursula Eggenberger reprising the role ad interim for a second time.

== Role ==
The position is a political appointment and has only a technocratic role.

The chancellor attends meetings of the Federal Council but does not have a vote. The chancellor also prepares the Federal Council's reports to the Federal Assembly on its policy and activities. Still, the chancellor's position is often referred to as that of an "eighth federal councillor". The chancellery is also responsible for the publication of all federal laws.

== List of federal chancellors ==
#	Tenure	Chancellor	Portrait	Birth–death	Party	Canton
1	1803–1830	Jean-Marc Mousson	Jean Marc Samuel Isaac Mousson	1776–1861	Liberal Party	Vaud
2	1831–1847	Josef Franz Karl Amrhyn	Josef Franz Karl Amrhyn	1800–1849	Liberal Party	Lucerne
3	1848–1881	Johann Ulrich Schiess	Johann Ulrich Schiess	1813–1883	Liberal Party	Appenzell Ausserrhoden
4	1882–1909	Gottlieb Ringier	Gottlieb Ringier	1837–1929	Liberal Party	Aargau
5	1910–1918	Hans Schatzmann	Hans Schatzmann	1848–1923	Free Democratic Party	Aargau
6	1919–1925	Adolf von Steiger	Adolf von Steiger	1859–1925	Free Democratic Party	Bern
7	1925–1934	Robert Käslin	Robert Käslin	1871–1934	Free Democratic Party	Nidwalden
8	1934–1943	George Bovet	George Bovet	1874–1946	Free Democratic Party	Neuchâtel
9	1944–1951	Oskar Leimgruber	Oskar Leimgruber	1886–1976	Christian Democratic People's Party	Fribourg
10	1951–1967	Charles Oser	Charles Oser	1902–1994	Free Democratic Party	Basel-Stadt
11	1968–1981	Karl Huber	Karl Huber	1915–2002	Christian Democratic People's Party	St. Gallen
12	1981–1991	Walter Buser	Walter Buser	1926–2019	Social Democratic Party	Basel-Landschaft
13	1991–1999	François Couchepin	François Couchepin	1935–2023	Free Democratic Party	Valais
14	2000–2007	Annemarie Huber-Hotz	Annemarie Huber-Hotz	1948–2019	Free Democratic Party	Zug
15	2008–2015	Corina Casanova	Corina Casanova	1956–	Christian Democratic People's Party	Grisons
16	2016–2023	Walter Thurnherr	Walter Thurnherr	1963–	Christian Democratic People's Party	Aargau
16	2016–2023	Walter Thurnherr	Walter Thurnherr	1963–	The Centre (Note: Walter Thurnherr was twice elected while a member of the Christian Democratic People's Party, and has been a continuous member of its successor, The Centre party, since it was formed following a merger with the Conservative Democratic Party, in January 2021.)	Aargau
17	2024–present	Viktor Rossi	Viktor Rossi	1968–	Green Liberal Party	Bern

== See also ==
- Politics of Switzerland
- List of presidents of the Swiss Confederation
- List of members of the Swiss Federal Council
- Lists of office-holders

== Sources ==
- "Chancellor of Switzerland" in German, French and Italian in the online Historical Dictionary of Switzerland.
- Hans-Urs Willi. "The Chancellor: a few historical highlights on the development of their person and the office from ancient times to the Middle Ages and the Zenden Republic of Valais". In Klaus, Michel (editor): Quelle chance pour nos institutions? Mélanges offerts à Monsieur François Couchepin, chancelier de la Confédération à l'occasion de son 60e anniversaire / Festschrift für Bundeskanzler François Couchepin zum 60. Geburtstag. Schlieren 1995. Translated by Paul Suffrin and Elsbeth Hagan.
