= Oswald Sigg =

Swiss journalist

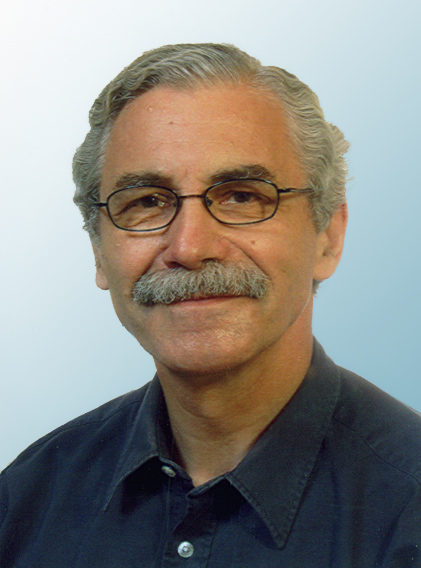
Sigg

Oswald Sigg (born 1944 in Zürich) is a Swiss journalist. In August 2005, he was elected Vice-Chancellor of Switzerland and Spokesman of the government of Switzerland, the Swiss Federal Council. He served as Spokesman until his retirement on 31 March 2009.

Sigg studied sociology and economics in St. Gallen, Paris and Berne. After graduating, he served as deputy spokesperson for the Federal Chancellery between 1975 and 1980, then as a spokesperson for the Federal Department of Finance (1975-1980), the Federal Department of Defence, Civil Protection and Sport (1998-2004) and the Federal Department of Environment, Transport, Energy and Communications (2004-2005), under five different Federal Councillors. He also worked as editor-in-chief for the Swiss Telegraphic Agency (1988-1990) and spokesman for the management of the Swiss Broadcasting Corporation between 1991 and 1997.

He was one of the figureheads behind the popular initiative for an unconditional basic income submitted to popular vote in 2016.

After beginning his political career with the BGB (the future Swiss People's Party), he is a member of the Social Democratic Party since 1973.

== Works ==
- Political Switzerland (translated from Die politische Schweiz), 1997, ISBN 3-908102-55-3

Political offices
Preceded by Achille Casanova	Vice-Chancellor of Switzerland; 2005–2009	Succeeded by André Simonazzi
