= Federal Chancellery of Switzerland =

Swiss government agency

Federal Chancellery
- Bundeskanzlei (German); Chancellerie fédérale (French); Cancelleria federale (Italian); Chanzlia federala (Romansh)

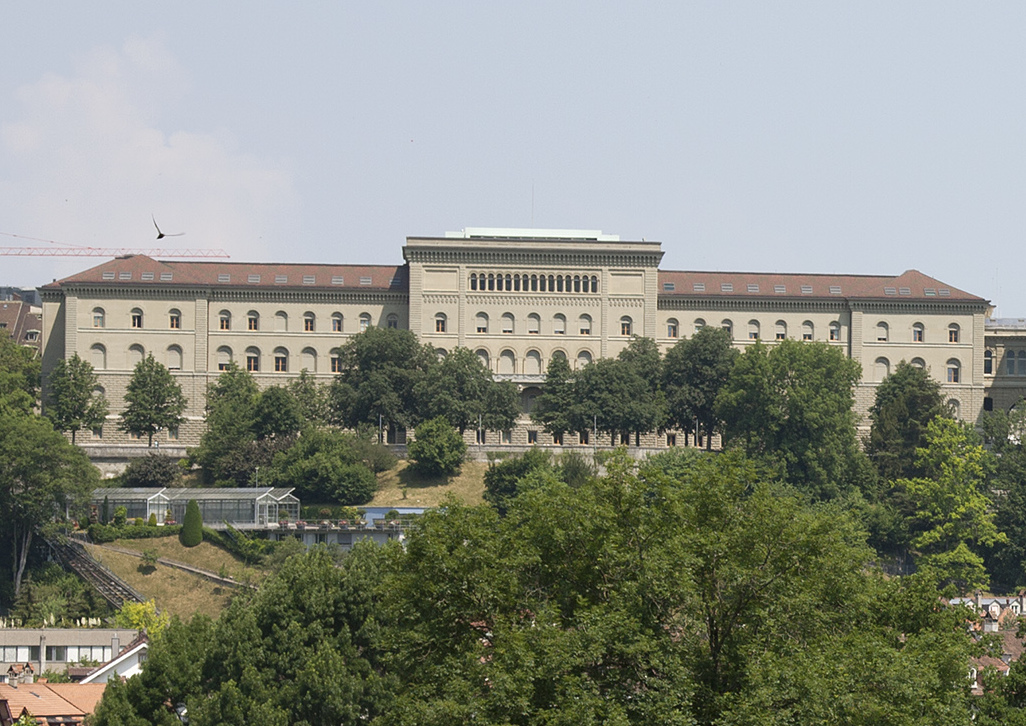
- The west wing of the Federal Palace.

Agency overview
- Formed: 1803; 223 years ago
- Jurisdiction: Federal administration of Switzerland
- Headquarters: Federal Palace, Bern
- Employees: 195
- Annual budget: CHF 57 million
- Agency executive: Viktor Rossi (GLP/PVL), Federal Chancellor
- Website: www.bk.admin.ch

The Federal Chancellery of Switzerland is a department-level agency of the federal administration of Switzerland. It is the staff organisation of the federal government, the Federal Council. Since 2024, it has been headed by Federal Chancellor Viktor Rossi of the Green Liberal Party of Switzerland.

== History ==
The Federal Chancellery was established by the 1803 Act of Mediation, before that, the recess notes were held by the cantonal chancellery of the canton that was hosting the tagsatzung. Until the establishment of the federal state in 1848, the chancellery was one of the few permanent offices of the Swiss Confederation.

During the first years, the Federal Chancellor was tasked with managing the protocol and the agenda of the tagsatzung, writing and printing the recess notes, the correspondence with the cantons and foreign nations, and maintaining the Federal archives.

After 1848, the Chancellery was attached to the Federal Department of Home Affairs until 1895, then to the Federal Department of Foreign Affairs until 1967, when it became an independent body.

Since 2007, the Federal Language Law (Sprachengesetz, Loi sur les langues, Legge sulle lingue, Lescha da linguas) requires "that official language use must be adequate, clear and intelligible as well as non-sexist." However, in practice, non-sexist language has been required in the German section of the Federal Chancellery's official texts since around 1998, whilst the French and Italian sections continue with a more traditional use of language made up of masculine terms.

== Organization ==
The Chancellery is divided into three distinct sectors. The Chancellor is the formal head of the Federal Chancellor Sector, comprising the planning & strategy section, the Internal Services section, the political rights section, the federal crisis management training unit of the Federal Administration, and the Records and Process Management section.

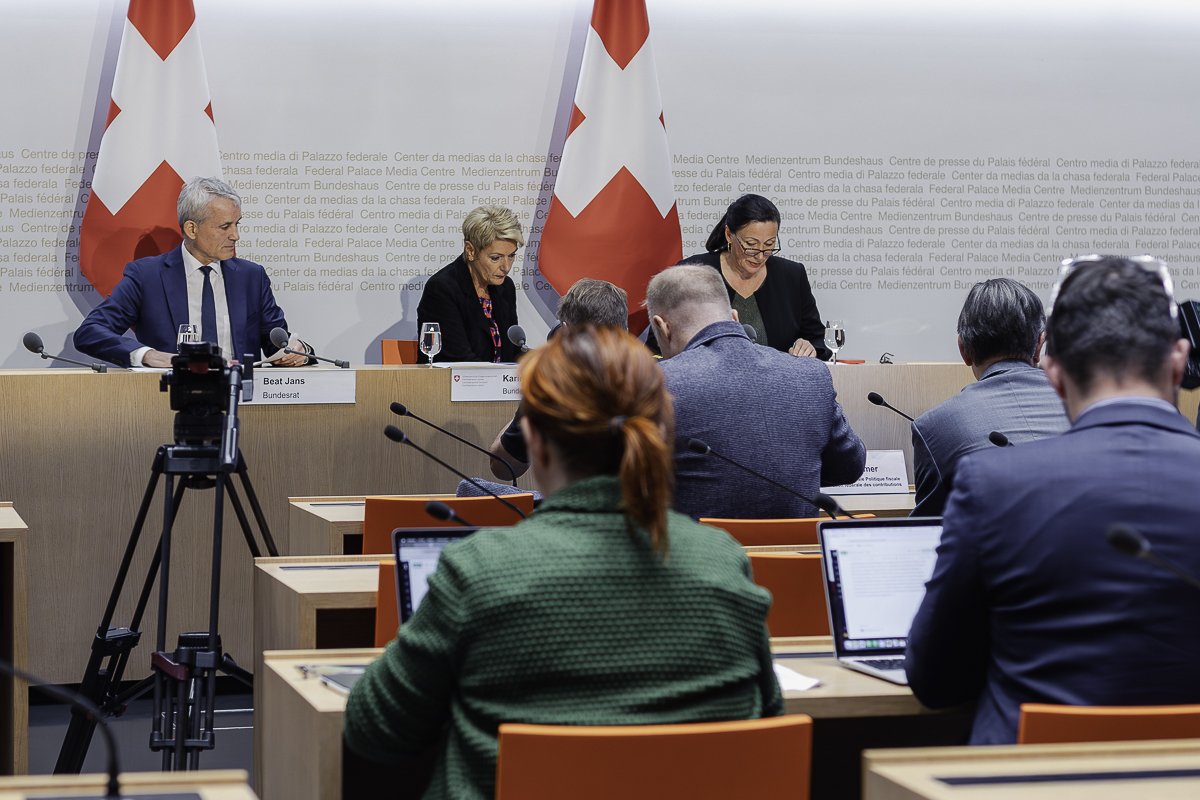
Vice-Chancellor Nicole Lamon (rear right) moderates a press conference with two members of the Swiss government (2025)

Two sectors are headed by the Vice-Chancellors: the Federal Council sector manages the agenda of the Federal Council's meeting. This sector comprises the Section for Federal Council Affairs, the Legal Section, the Official Publications Centre and the Central Language Services. The Information & Communications Sector is led by another Vice-Chancellor, this role also has expanded to become the official spokesman for the Federal Council in 2000. This sector includes the e-Government Section, the Communication Support Section and the Political Forum of the Confederation.

For administrative purposes, the Federal Data Protection and Information Commissioner is affiliated to the Chancellery. The Federal Data Protection and Information Commissioner is responsible for the supervision of federal authorities and private bodies with respect to data protection and freedom of information legislation.

== Roles ==
=== Federal Chancellor ===
The Federal Chancellor is elected by Parliament for a term of four years, usually at the same time as the Federal Council. Initially a magistrate function, its role became less important after 1918 when it served mainly as a career reward for distinguished public servants. The role however was revived and became the true Chief-of-Staff to the Federal Council following the 1967 mirage affair.

=== Vice-Chancellor ===
Initially named Federal Secretary (Bundesschreiber), the title of the Vice-Chancellor was established in 1851, first as Federal Chancellor Deputy, then formally as Vice-Chancellor in 1881. In order to provide a balance between languages and geographical representation, it became custom since 1895 to name a second Vice-Chancellor from a French-speaking canton if both the Chancellor and Vice-Chancellor were Swiss-German. The second Vice-Chancellor became a permanent position in 1967.

Unlike the Federal Chancellor, Vice-Chancellors are appointed by the Federal Council directly.

After both Vice-Chancellors retired in 2005, a row erupted over language representation when Oswald Sigg was named successor to Vice-Chancellor and Federal Council spokesman Achille Casanova. With Federal Chancellor Annemarie Huber-Hotz and the other Vice-Chancellorship conferred to Corina Casanova (no relationship to Achille Casanova), the three key roles in the Federal Chancellery were held by Swiss Germans. Remarkably enough, though, when Corinna Casanova was elected Federal Chancellor three years later, the nomination of Thomas Helbling as her successor, another Swiss German, raised no such public criticism. At the time, the Tages-Anzeiger speculated that this might be due to the Latin cantons aiming for the post of Oswald Sigg, due to retire a bit later. Whether founded or not, the appointment of André Simonazzi in 2009 did indeed restore the language balance.

== Full-time positions since 2001 ==
Raw data

"Federal Finance Administration FFA: State financial statements".
"Federal Finance Administration FFA: Data portal".
"Integration of the Federal IT Steering Unit (ISB) into the new organisational unit Digital Transformation and ICT Steering (DTI) within the Federal Chancellery with effect from 1 January 2021" (in German).

== See also ==
- Federal Data Protection and Information Commissioner
