= Switzerland =

Country in Central Europe

Swiss Confederation
Name in official languages and Latin
- - German: Schweizerische Eidgenossenschaft
  - French: Confédération suisse
  - Italian: Confederazione Svizzera
  - Romansh: Confederaziun svizra
  - Latin: Confoederatio helvetica
- Flag Coat of arms
- Motto: (unofficial) "Unus pro omnibus, omnes pro uno" "One for all, all for one"
- Anthem: "Swiss Psalm"
- Location of Switzerland (green) in Europe (green and dark grey)
- Capital: None (de jure); Bern (de facto)
- Federal city: Bern (Note: Bern is referred to as "federal city" (German: Bundesstadt; French: ville fédérale; Italian: città federale; Romansh: citad federala). Swiss law does not designate a capital as such, but the federal parliament and government are installed in Bern, while other federal institutions, such as the federal courts, are in other cities (Bellinzona, Lausanne, Lucerne, Neuchâtel, St. Gallen a.o.).)
- Largest city: Zurich
- Official languages: German (62%), French (23%), Italian (8%), Romansh (0.5%)
- Nationality (2024): 72.6% Swiss; 27.4% foreign nationals
- Religion (2024): 54.7% Christianity; 30% Catholicism; 18.7% Protestantism; 6% other Christian; 36.8% no religion; 6% Islam; 1.5% other religions; 0.9% unanswered
- Demonyms: English: Swiss; German: Schweizer/Schweizerin; French: Suisse/Suissesse; Italian: svizzero/svizzera or elvetico/elvetica; Romansh: Svizzer/Svizra
- Government: Federal assembly-independent directorial republic
  - Federal Councillors: Guy Parmelin (President); Ignazio Cassis (Vice president)
  - Federal Chancellor: Viktor Rossi
- Legislature: Federal Assembly
  - Upper house: Council of States
  - Lower house: National Council

History
  - Founded: 1 August 1291 (Note: Traditional date. The original date of the Rütli Oath was 1307 (reported by Aegidius Tschudi in the 16th century) and is just one among several comparable treaties between more or less the same parties during that period. The date of the Federal Charter of 1291 was selected in 1891 for the official celebration of the "Confederacy's 600th anniversary".)
  - Sovereignty recognised (Peace of Westphalia): 24 October 1648
  - Federal Treaty: 7 August 1815
  - Federal state: 12 September 1848 (Note: A solemn declaration of the Tagsatzung declared the Federal Constitution adopted on 12 September 1848. A resolution of the Tagsatzung of 14 September 1848 specified that the powers of the institutions provided for by the 1815 Federal Treaty would expire at the time of the constitution of the Federal Council, which took place on 16 November 1848.)

Area
  - Total: 41,291 km^{2} (15,943 sq mi) (132nd)
  - Water (%): 4

Population
  - 2026 estimate: ▲9,154,242 (99th)
  - 2015 census: ▲8,327,126
  - Density: 222/km^{2} (575.0/sq mi) (67th)
- GDP (PPP): 2026 estimate
  - Total: ▲$975.753 billion (37th)
  - Per capita: ▲$106,944 (6th)
- GDP (nominal): 2026 estimate
  - Total: ▲$1.136 trillion (20th)
  - Per capita: ▲$124,478 (3rd)
- Gini (2023): ▲31.5 medium inequality
- HDI (2023): ▲0.970 very high (2nd)
- Currency: Swiss franc (CHF)
- Time zone: UTC+1 (CET)
  - Summer (DST): UTC+2 (CEST)
- Date format: dd.mm.yyyy (AD)
- Calling code: +41
- ISO 3166 code: CH
- Internet TLD: .ch, .swiss

Switzerland, (Note: German: Schweiz [ʃvaɪts]; French: Suisse [sɥis]; Italian: Svizzera [ˈzvittsera]; Romansh: Svizra [ˈʒviːtsrɐ] or [ˈʒviːtsʁːɐ].) officially the Swiss Confederation, (Note: German: Schweizerische Eidgenossenschaft [ˈʃvaɪtsərɪʃɛ ˈaɪdɡəˌnɔsn̩ʃaft]; French: Confédération suisse [kɔ̃fedeʁasjɔ̃ sɥis]; Italian: Confederazione Svizzera [konfederatˈtsjone ˈzvittsera]; Romansh: Confederaziun svizra; Latin: Cōnfoederātiō Helvētica.) is a landlocked country located at the intersection of Central, Western, and Southern Europe. (Note: There are several definitions. See Geography of Switzerland#Western or Central Europe.) (Note: The canton of Ticino is sometimes included as part of Southern Europe, as it lies geographically on the south side of the Alps (Po Basin).) It is bordered by Germany to the north, France to the west, Austria and Liechtenstein to the east, and Italy to the south. Switzerland is geographically divided among the Swiss Alps, the Swiss Plateau, and the Jura Mountains; the Alps cover most of the country's territory, whereas the majority of its 9 million people are concentrated on the plateau, which hosts many of the largest cities and economic centres, including Zurich, Geneva, Basel, Bern, Lausanne, Winterthur, and Lucerne.

Switzerland is a federal republic composed of 26 cantons, with Bern serving as the federal city and the seat of the national government. The country encompasses four principal linguistic and cultural regions—German, French, Italian, and Romansh—reflecting a long-standing tradition of multilingualism and cultural pluralism. Swiss national identity nonetheless remains fairly cohesive, rooted in a shared historical background, common values such as federalism and direct democracy, and Alpine symbolism. Swiss nationhood transcends language, ethnicity, and religion, leading to Switzerland being described as a Willensnation ("nation of volition") rather than a conventional nation state.

The country originates from the Old Swiss Confederacy established in the Late Middle Ages as a defensive and commercial alliance; the Federal Charter of 1291 is considered the country's founding document. The confederation steadily expanded and consolidated despite external threats and internal political and religious strife. Swiss independence from the Holy Roman Empire was formally recognized in the Peace of Westphalia in 1648. The confederation was among the first and few republics of the early modern period, and the only one besides San Marino to survive the Napoleonic Wars. Switzerland remained a network of self-governing states until 1798, when revolutionary France invaded and imposed the centralist Helvetic Republic. Napoleon abolished the republic in 1803 and reinstated a confederation. Following the Napoleonic Wars, Switzerland restored its pre-revolutionary system, but by 1830 faced growing division and conflict between liberal and conservative movements; this culminated in a new constitution in 1848 that established the current federal system and enshrined principles such as individual rights, separation of powers, and parliamentary bicameralism.

Switzerland has maintained a policy of armed neutrality since the 16th century and has not fought an international war since 1815. It joined the Council of Europe in 1964 and the United Nations (UN) in 2002, pursuing an active foreign policy that includes frequent involvement in peace building and global governance. Switzerland is the birthplace of the Red Cross and hosts the headquarters or offices of most major international institutions, including the WTO, the WHO, the ILO, FIFA, the WEF, and the UN. It is a founding member of the European Free Trade Association (EFTA) and participates in the European single market and the Schengen Area. Switzerland is among the world's most developed countries, with the highest nominal wealth per adult and the eighth-highest gross domestic product (GDP) per capita. It performs highly on several international metrics, including economic competitiveness, democratic governance, and press freedom. Zurich, Geneva and Basel rank among the highest in quality of life, albeit with some of the highest costs of living. Switzerland has a longstanding banking and financial sector, advanced pharmaceutical and biotechnology industries, and a strong tradition of watchmaking, precision engineering, and technology. It is known for its chocolate and cheese production, well-developed tourism industry, and growing startup sector.

== Etymology ==
The English name Switzerland compounds Switzer, an obsolete term for a Swiss person which was in use during the 16th to 19th centuries, with the common English suffix -land denoting a region or country. The English adjective Swiss is a loanword from French Suisse, also in use since the 16th century. The name Switzer is from the Alemannic Schwiizer, in origin an inhabitant of Schwyz and its associated territory, one of the Waldstätte cantons which formed the nucleus of the Old Swiss Confederacy. The Swiss began to adopt the name for themselves after the Swabian War of 1499, used alongside the term for "Confederates", Eidgenossen (literally: comrades by oath), used since the 14th century. The ISO 3166-1 data codes for Switzerland, CH and CHE, are derived from Latin Confoederatio Helvetica (Helvetic Confederation).

The toponym Schwyz itself was first attested in 972, as Old High German Suittes, perhaps related to swedan 'to burn' (cf. Old Norse svíða 'to singe, burn'), referring to the area of forest that was burned and cleared to build. The name was extended to the area dominated by the canton, and after the Swabian War of 1499 gradually came to be used for the entire Confederation. The Swiss German name of the country, Schwiiz, is homophonous to that of the canton and the settlement, but distinguished by the use of the definite article (d'Schwiiz for the Confederation, but simply Schwyz for the canton and the town). The long [iː] of Swiss German is historically and still often today spelled ⟨y⟩ rather than ⟨ii⟩, preserving the original identity of the two names even in writing.

The Latin name Confoederatio Helvetica was neologised and introduced gradually after the formation of the federal state in 1848, harking back to the Napoleonic Helvetic Republic. It appeared on coins from 1879, inscribed on the Federal Palace in 1902 and after 1948 used in the official seal (e.g., the ISO banking code "CHF" for the Swiss franc, the Swiss postage stamps ('HELVETIA') and the country top-level domain ".ch", are both taken from the state's Latin name). The name Helvetica is derived from the Helvetii, a Gaulish tribe living on the Swiss Plateau before the Roman era. It in turn, gives its name to a typeface developed in 1960.

Helvetia appeared as a national personification of the Swiss confederacy in the 17th century in a 1672 play by Johann Caspar Weissenbach.

== History ==
The state of Switzerland took its present form with the adoption of the Swiss Federal Constitution in 1848. Switzerland's precursors established a defensive alliance in 1291, forming a loose confederation that persisted for centuries.

=== Beginnings ===
The oldest traces of hominid existence in Switzerland date to about 150,000 years ago. The oldest known farming settlements in Switzerland, which were found at Gächlingen, date to around 5300 BC.

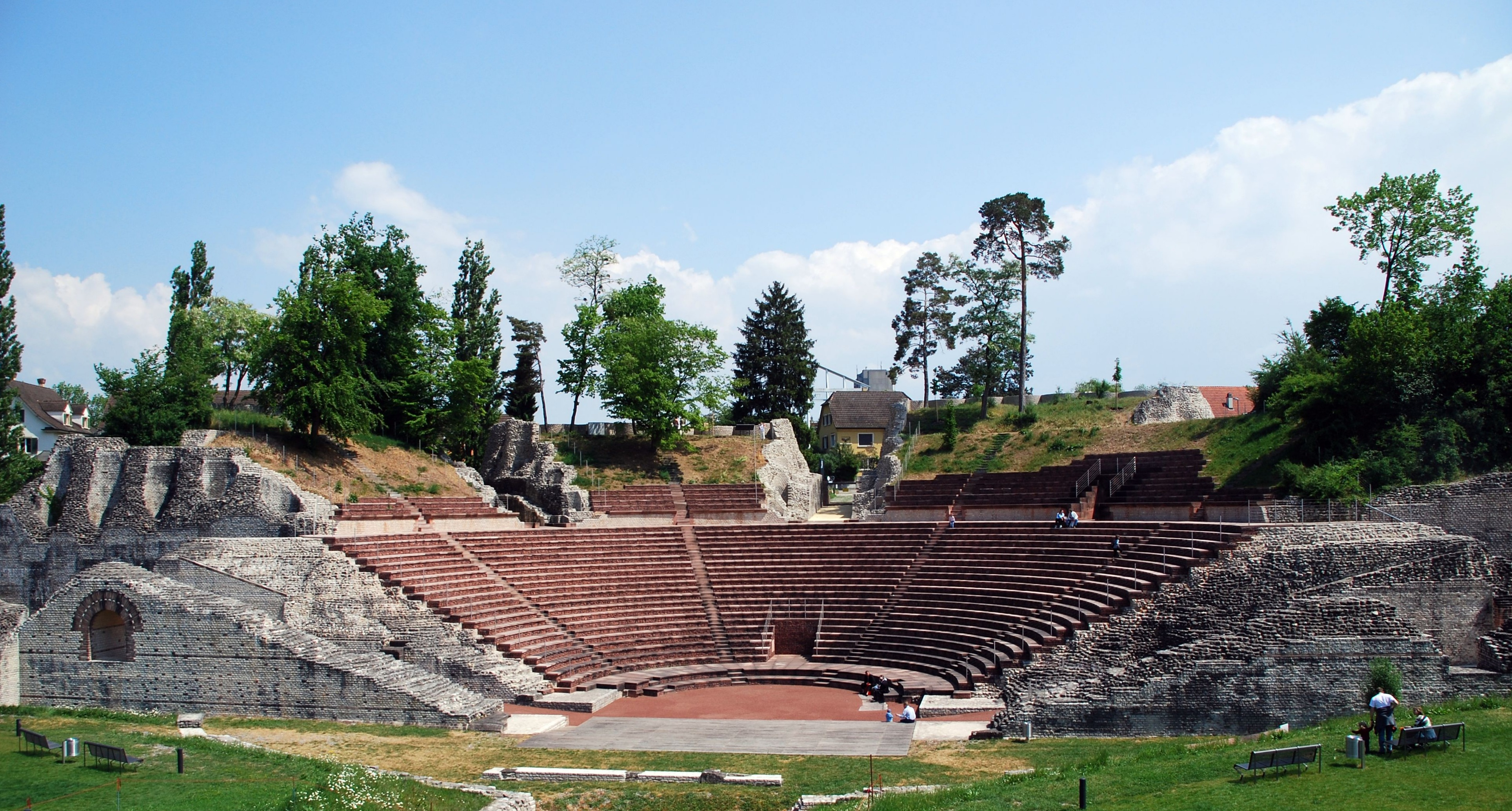
Founded in 44 BC by Lucius Munatius Plancus, Augusta Raurica (near Basel) was the first Roman settlement on the Rhine and is now among the most important archaeological sites in Switzerland.

The earliest known tribes formed the Hallstatt and La Tène cultures, named after the archaeological site of La Tène on the north side of Lake Neuchâtel. La Tène culture developed and flourished during the late Iron Age from around 450 BC, possibly influenced by Greek and Etruscan civilisations. One of the most prominent La Tène tribes were the Helvetii, who primarily occupied the Swiss Plateau, alongside the Rhaetians in the eastern regions. Facing pressures from Germanic tribes, in 58 BC, the Helvetii, influenced by Orgetorix, a wealthy aristocrat, decided to abandon the Swiss Plateau for better opportunities in western Gallia. After Orgetorix's mysterious death, the tribe continued their migration but was decisively defeated by Julius Caesar's armies at the Battle of Bibracte, in present-day eastern France. Following their defeat, the Helvetii were forced by Caesar to return to their original lands, where they were subjected to stringent restrictions on their autonomy and movements. In 15 BC, Tiberius (later the second Roman emperor) and his brother Drusus conquered the Alps, integrating them into the Roman Empire. The area occupied by the Helvetii first became part of Rome's Gallia Belgica province and then of its Germania Superior province. The eastern portion of modern Switzerland was integrated into the Roman province of Raetia. Sometime around the start of the Common Era, the Romans maintained a large camp called Vindonissa, now a ruin at the confluence of the Aare and Reuss rivers, near the town of Windisch.

The first and second century AD was an age of prosperity on the Swiss Plateau. Towns such as Aventicum, Iulia Equestris and Augusta Raurica reached a remarkable size, while hundreds of agricultural estates (Villae rusticae) were established in the countryside.

Around 260 AD, the fall of the Agri Decumates territory north of the Rhine transformed today's Switzerland into a frontier land of the Empire. Repeated raids by the Alamanni tribes provoked the ruin of the Roman towns and economy, forcing the population to shelter near Roman fortresses, like the Castrum Rauracense near Augusta Raurica. The Empire built another line of defence at the north border (the so-called Donau-Iller-Rhine-Limes). At the end of the fourth century, the increased Germanic pressure forced the Romans to abandon the linear defence concept. The Swiss Plateau was finally open to Germanic tribes.

In the Early Middle Ages, from the end of the fourth century, the western extent of modern-day Switzerland was part of the territory of the Kings of the Burgundians, who introduced the French language to the area. The Alemanni settled the Swiss Plateau in the fifth century and the valleys of the Alps in the eighth century, forming Alemannia. Modern-day Switzerland was then divided between the kingdoms of Alemannia and Burgundy. The entire region became part of the expanding Frankish Empire in the sixth century, following Clovis I's victory over the Alemanni at Tolbiac in 504 AD, and later Frankish domination of the Burgundians.

In the sixth to eighth centuries, Swiss regions continued under Frankish hegemony (Merovingian and Carolingian dynasties) but after its extension under Charlemagne, the Frankish Empire was divided by the Treaty of Verdun in 843. The territories of present-day Switzerland became divided into Middle Francia and East Francia until they were reunified under the Holy Roman Empire around 1000 AD.

In the 10th century, as the rule of the Carolingians waned, Magyars destroyed Basel in 917 and St. Gallen in 926. In response, Henry the Fowler, the then ruler of East Francia, decreed the fortification of key settlements to defend against these invasions. Large villages and towns, including strategic locations like Zurich and St.Gallen, were fortified. This initiative led to the development of what were essentially early urban strongholds and city governments in Eastern Switzerland.

By 1200, the Swiss Plateau comprised the dominions of the houses of Savoy, Zähringer, Habsburg, and Kyburg. Some regions (Uri, Schwyz, Unterwalden, later known as Waldstätten) were accorded the Imperial immediacy to grant the empire direct control over the mountain passes. With the extinction of its male line in 1263, the Kyburg dynasty fell in AD 1264. The Habsburgs under King Rudolph I (Holy Roman Emperor in 1273) laid claim to the Kyburg lands and annexed them, extending their territory to the eastern Swiss Plateau.

=== Old Swiss Confederacy ===
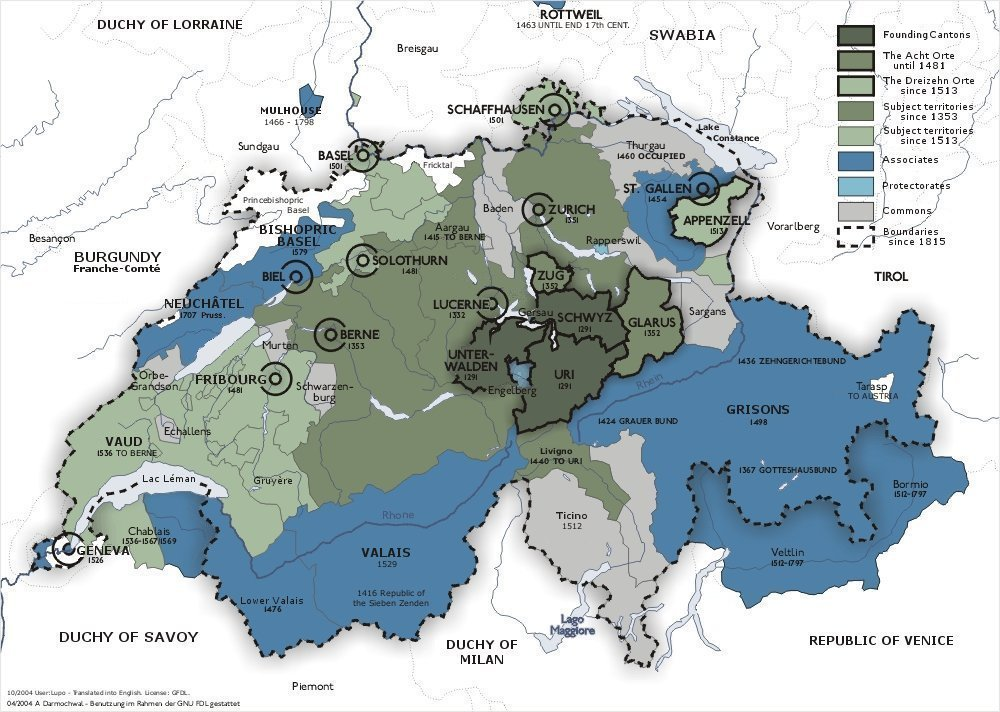
The Old Swiss Confederacy from 1291 (dark green) to the sixteenth century (light green) and its associates (blue). In the other colours shown are the subject territories.

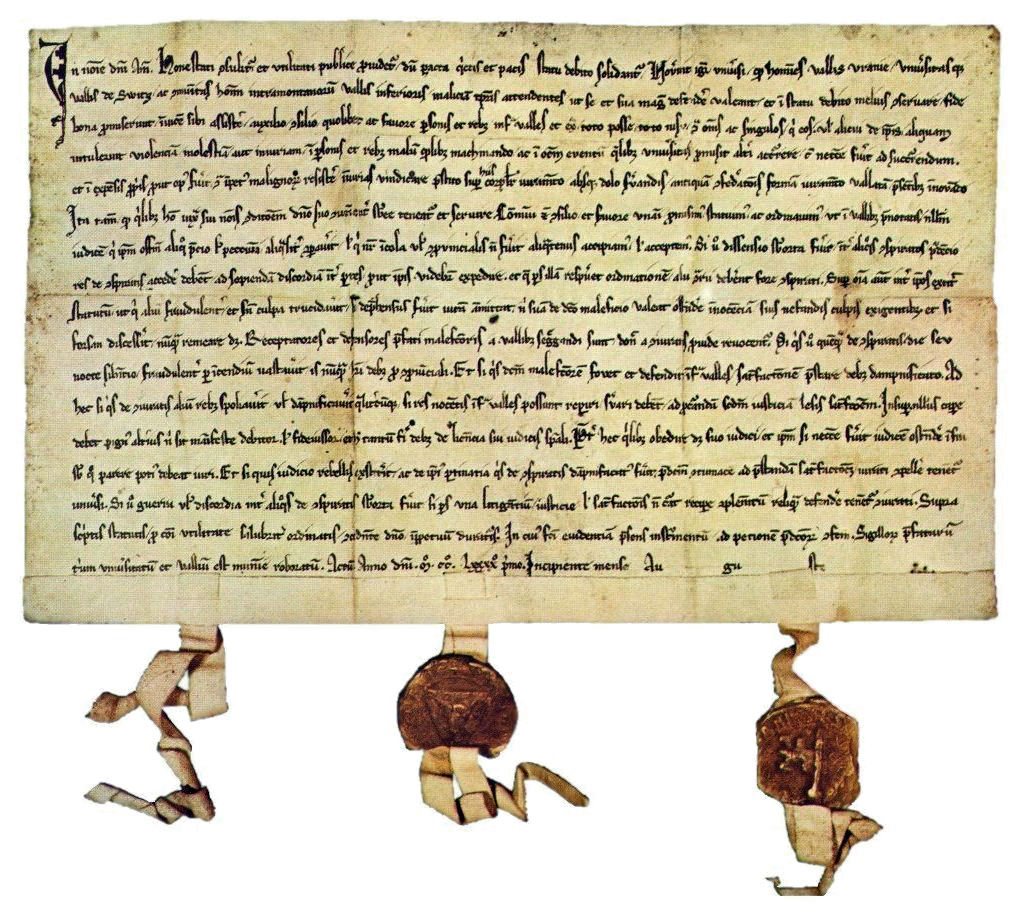
The 1291 Bundesbrief (federal charter)

The Old Swiss Confederacy was an alliance among the valley communities of the central Alps. The Confederacy was governed by nobles and patricians of various cantons who facilitated management of common interests and ensured peace on mountain trade routes. The Federal Charter of 1291 is considered the confederacy's founding document, even though similar alliances likely existed decades earlier. The document was agreed among the rural communes of Uri, Schwyz, and Unterwalden.

By 1353, the three original cantons had joined with the cantons of Glarus and Zug and the Lucerne, Zurich and Bern city-states to form the "Old Confederacy" of eight states that obtained through the end of the 15th century. The expansion led to increased power and wealth for the confederation. By 1460, the confederates controlled most of the territory south and west of the Rhine to the Alps and the Jura Mountains, and the University of Basel was founded (with a faculty of medicine) establishing a tradition of chemical and medical research. This increased after victories against the Habsburgs (Battle of Sempach, Battle of Näfels), over Charles the Bold of Burgundy during the 1470s, and the success of the Swiss mercenaries. The Swiss victory in the Swabian War against the Swabian League of Emperor Maximilian I in 1499 amounted to de facto independence within the Holy Roman Empire. In 1501, Basel and Schaffhausen joined the Old Swiss Confederacy.

The Confederacy acquired a reputation of invincibility during these earlier wars, but expansion of the confederation suffered a setback in 1515 with the Swiss defeat in the Battle of Marignano. This ended the so-called "heroic" epoch of Swiss history. The success of Zwingli's Reformation in some cantons led to inter-cantonal religious conflicts in 1529 and 1531 (Wars of Kappel). It was not until more than one hundred years after these internal wars that, in 1648, under the Peace of Westphalia, European countries recognised Switzerland's independence from the Holy Roman Empire and its neutrality.

During the Early Modern period of Swiss history, the growing authoritarianism of the patriciate families combined with a financial crisis in the wake of the Thirty Years' War led to the Swiss peasant war of 1653. In the background to this struggle, the conflict between Catholic and Protestant cantons persisted, erupting in further violence at the First War of Villmergen, in 1656, and the Toggenburg War (or Second War of Villmergen), in 1712.

=== Napoleonic era ===
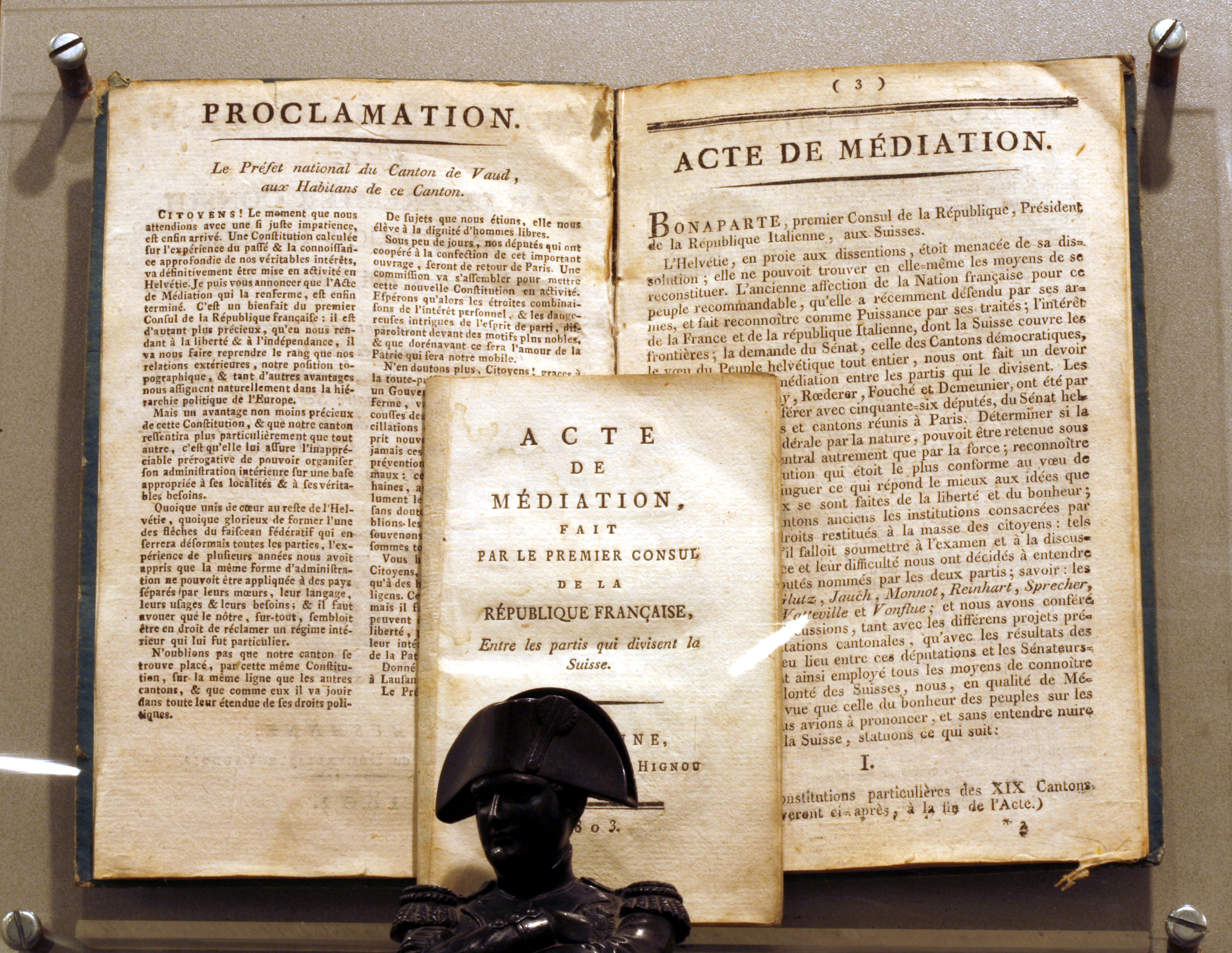
The Act of Mediation was Napoleon's attempt at a compromise between the Ancien Régime and a Republic.

In 1798, the revolutionary French government invaded Switzerland and imposed a new unified constitution. This centralised the government of the country, effectively abolishing the cantons: moreover, Mülhausen left Switzerland and the Valtellina valley became part of the Cisalpine Republic. The new regime, known as the Helvetic Republic, was highly unpopular. An invading foreign army had imposed and destroyed centuries of tradition, making Switzerland nothing more than a French satellite state. The fierce French suppression of the Nidwalden Revolt in September 1798 was an example of the oppressive presence of the French Army and the local population's resistance to the occupation.

When war broke out between France and its rivals, Russian and Austrian forces invaded Switzerland. The Swiss refused to fight alongside the French in the name of the Helvetic Republic. In 1803 Napoleon organised a meeting of the leading Swiss politicians from both sides in Paris. The Act of Mediation was the result, which largely restored Swiss autonomy and introduced a Confederation of 19 cantons. Henceforth, much of Swiss politics would concern balancing the cantons' tradition of self-rule with the need for a central government.

In 1815, the Congress of Vienna fully re-established Swiss independence, and the European powers recognised permanent Swiss neutrality. Swiss troops served foreign governments until 1860 when they fought in the siege of Gaeta. The treaty allowed Switzerland to increase its territory, with the admission of the cantons of Valais, Neuchâtel and Geneva. Switzerland's borders saw only minor adjustments thereafter.

=== Federal state ===
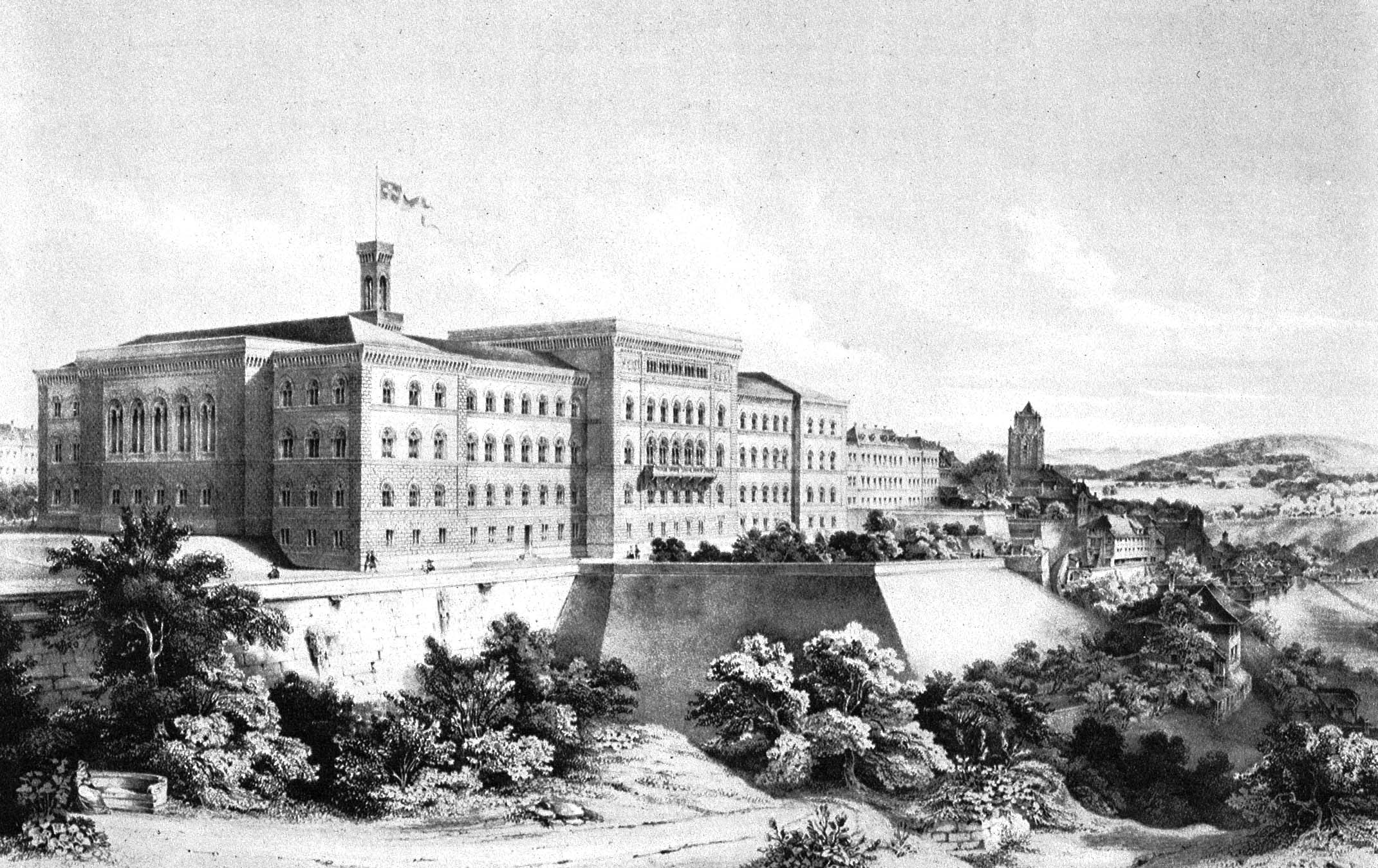
The first Federal Palace in Bern (1857). One of the three cantons presiding over the Tagsatzung (former legislative and executive council), Bern was chosen as the permanent seat of federal legislative and executive institutions in 1848, in part because of its closeness to the French-speaking area.

The restoration of power to the patriciate was only temporary. After a period of unrest with repeated violent clashes, such as the Züriputsch of 1839, civil war (the Sonderbundskrieg) broke out in 1847, when some Catholic cantons tried to set up a separate alliance (the Sonderbund). The war lasted less than a month, causing fewer than 100 casualties, most of which were through friendly fire. The Sonderbundskrieg had a significant impact on the psychology and society of Switzerland.

The war convinced most Swiss of the need for unity and strength. Swiss from all strata of society, whether Catholic or Protestant, from the liberal or conservative current, realised that the cantons would profit more from merging their economic and religious interests.

Thus, while the rest of Europe saw revolutionary uprisings, the Swiss created a constitution that provided for a federal layout, much of it inspired by the United States Constitution. This new constitution provided central authority while leaving the cantons the right to self-government on local issues. Giving credit to those who favoured the power of the cantons (the Sonderbund Kantone), the national assembly was divided between an upper house (the Council of States, two representatives per canton) and a lower house (the National Council, with representatives elected from across the country). Referendums were made mandatory for any amendments. This new constitution ended the legal power of nobility in Switzerland.

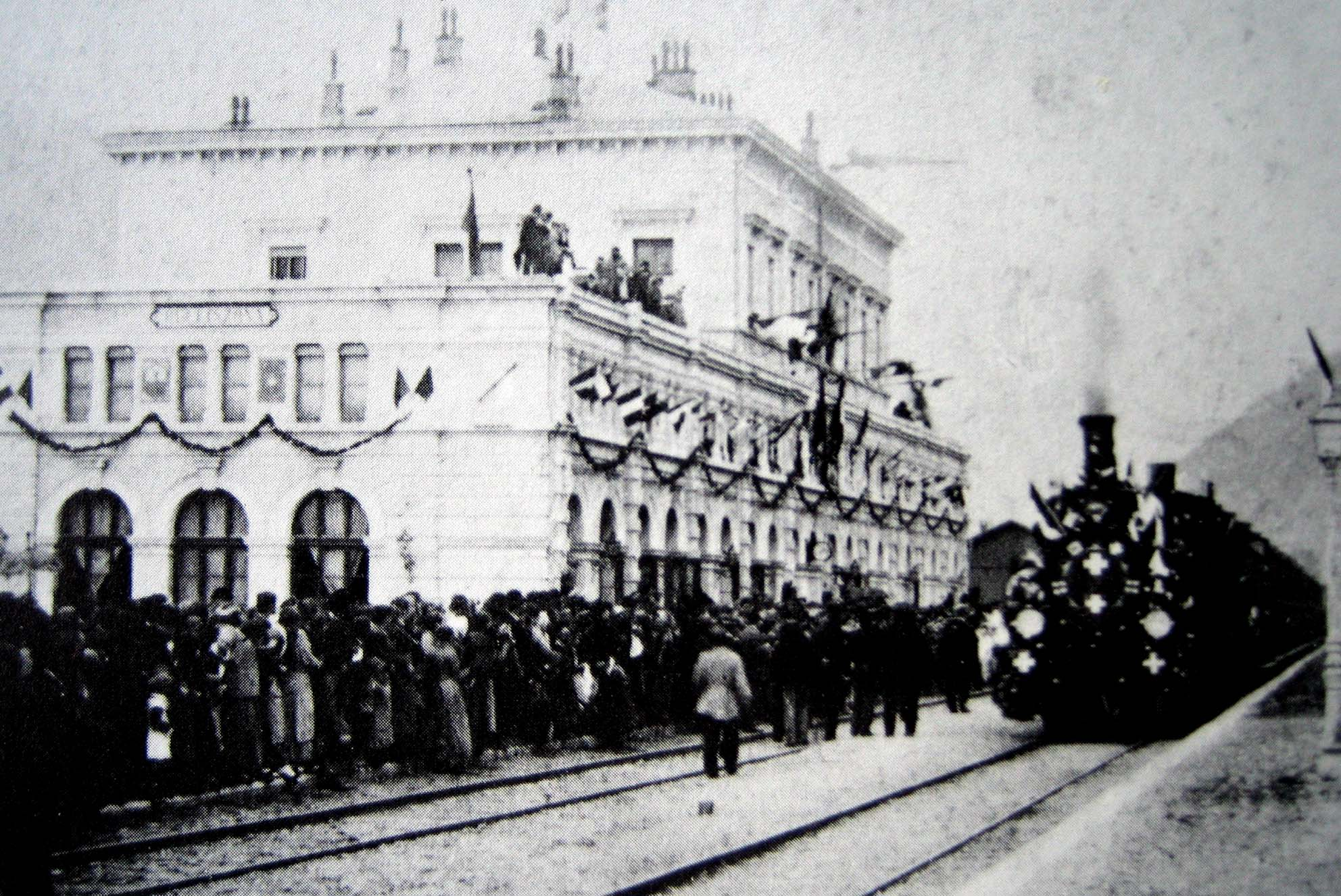
Inauguration in 1882 of the Gotthard rail tunnel connecting the southern canton of Ticino, the longest in the world at the time

A single system of weights and measures was introduced, and in 1850, the Swiss franc became the Swiss single currency, complemented by the WIR franc in 1934. Article 11 of the constitution forbade sending troops to serve abroad, marking the end of foreign service. It came with the exception of serving the Holy See, and the Swiss were still obliged to serve Francis II of the Two Sicilies, with Swiss Guards present at the siege of Gaeta in 1860.

An important clause of the constitution was that it could be entirely rewritten, if necessary, thus enabling it to evolve as a whole rather than being modified one amendment at a time.

This need soon proved itself when the rise in population and the Industrial Revolution that followed led to calls to modify the constitution accordingly. The population rejected an early draft in 1872, but modifications led to its acceptance in 1874. It introduced the facultative referendum for laws at the federal level. It also established federal responsibility for defence, trade, and legal matters.

In 1891, the constitution was revised with uncommonly strong elements of direct democracy, which remain unique today.

=== Modern history ===
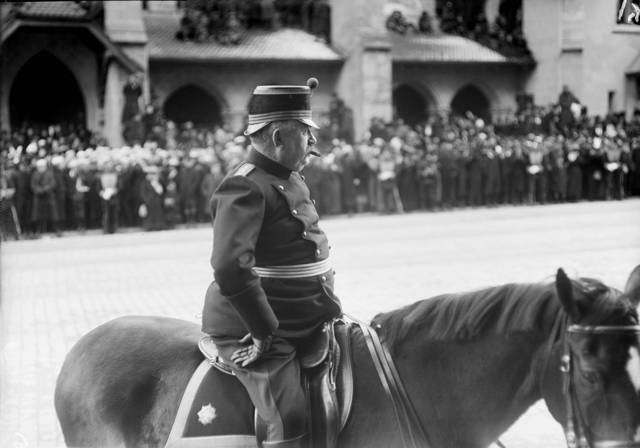
General Ulrich Wille, appointed commander-in-chief of the Swiss Army for the duration of World War I

Switzerland was not invaded during either of the world wars. During World War I, Switzerland was home to the revolutionary and founder of the Soviet Union Vladimir Illych Ulyanov (Vladimir Lenin) who remained there until 1917. Swiss neutrality was seriously questioned by the short-lived Grimm–Hoffmann affair in 1917. In 1920, Switzerland joined the League of Nations, which was based in Geneva, after it was exempted from military requirements.

During World War II, detailed invasion plans were drawn up by the Germans, but Switzerland was never attacked. Switzerland was able to remain independent through a combination of military deterrence, concessions to Germany, and good fortune, as larger events during the war intervened. General Henri Guisan, appointed the commander-in-chief for the duration of the war, ordered a general mobilisation of the armed forces. The Swiss military strategy changed from static defence at the borders to organised long-term attrition and withdrawal to strong, well-stockpiled positions high in the Alps, known as the Reduit. Switzerland was an important base for espionage by both sides and often mediated communications between the Axis and Allied powers.

Switzerland's trade was blockaded by both the Allies and the Axis. Economic cooperation with Nazi Germany; such as purchasing gold (enabling Germany to purchase foreign goods) and extension of credit varied according to the perceived likelihood of invasion and the availability of other trading partners. Concessions reached a peak after a crucial rail link through Vichy France was severed in 1942, leaving Switzerland (together with Liechtenstein) entirely isolated from the wider world by Axis-controlled territory. Over the course of the war, Switzerland interned over 300,000 refugees aided by the International Red Cross, based in Geneva. Strict immigration and asylum policies and the financial relationships with Nazi Germany became controversial by the end of the 20th century.

During the war, the Swiss Air Force engaged aircraft of both sides, shooting down 11 intruding Luftwaffe planes in May and June 1940, then forcing down other intruders after a change of policy following threats from Germany. Over 100 Allied bombers and their crews were interned. Between 1940 and 1945, Switzerland was bombed by the Allies, causing fatalities and property damage. Among the cities and towns bombed were Basel, Brusio, Chiasso, Cornol, Geneva, Koblenz, Niederweningen, Rafz, Renens, Samedan, Schaffhausen, Stein am Rhein, Tägerwilen, Thayngen, Vals, and Zurich. Allied forces maintained that the bombings, which violated the 96th Article of War, resulted from navigation errors, equipment failure, weather conditions, and pilot errors. The Swiss expressed fear and concern that the bombings were intended to put pressure on Switzerland to end economic cooperation and neutrality with Nazi Germany. Court-martial proceedings took place in England. The US paid SFR 62M for reparations.

Switzerland's attitude towards refugees was complicated and controversial; over the course of the war, it admitted as many as 300,000 refugees while refusing tens of thousands more, including Jews persecuted by the Nazis.

After the war, the Swiss government exported credits through the charitable fund known as the Schweizerspende and donated to the Marshall Plan to help Europe's recovery, efforts that ultimately benefited the Swiss economy.

During the Cold War, Swiss authorities considered the construction of a Swiss nuclear bomb. Leading nuclear physicists at the Federal Institute of Technology Zurich such as Paul Scherrer made this a realistic possibility. In 1988, the Paul Scherrer Institute was founded in his name to explore the therapeutic uses of neutron scattering technologies. Financial problems with the defence budget and ethical considerations prevented the substantial funds from being allocated, and the Nuclear Non-Proliferation Treaty of 1968 was seen as a valid alternative. Plans for building nuclear weapons were dropped by 1988. Switzerland joined the Council of Europe in 1963.

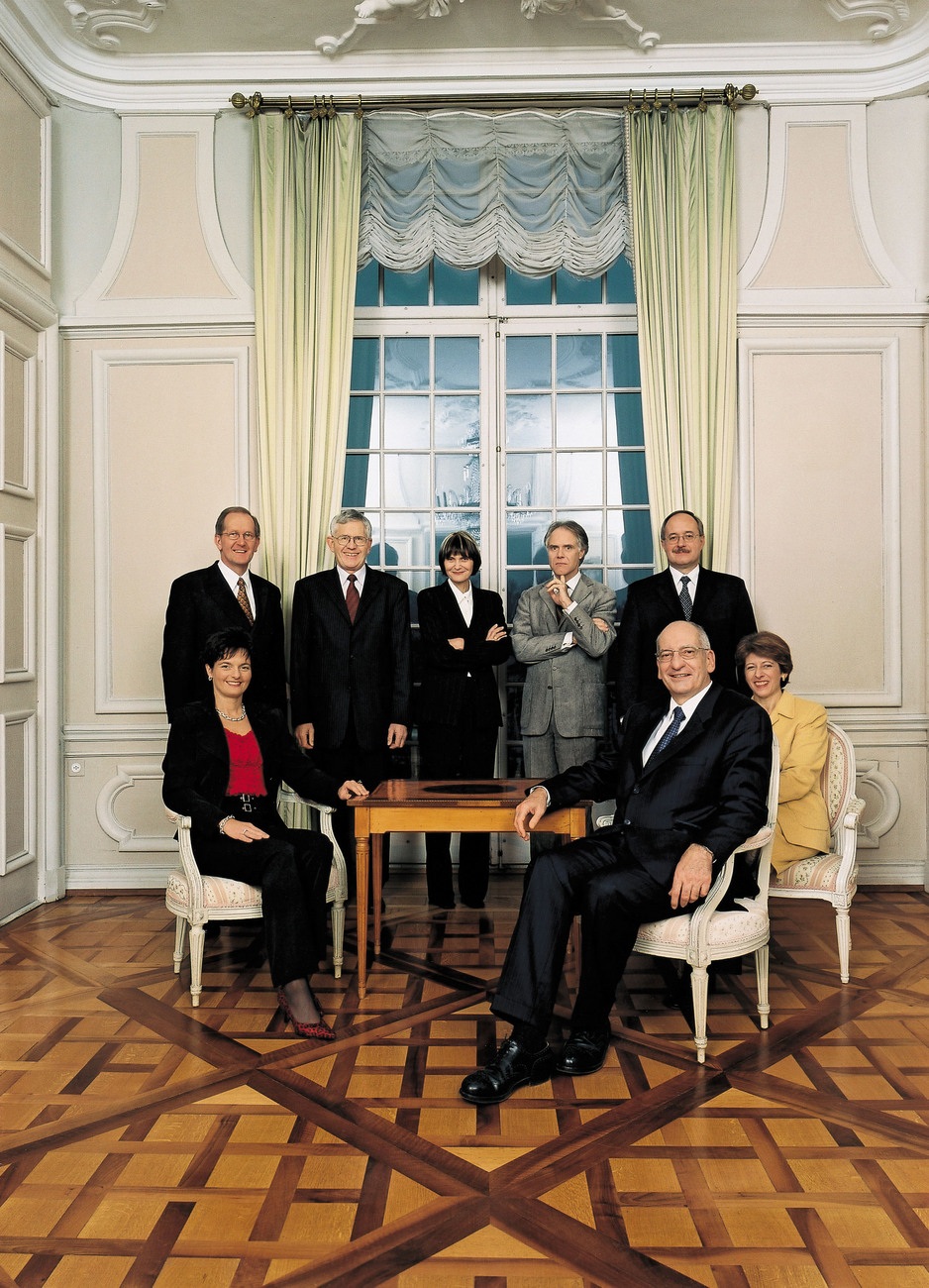
In 2003, by granting the Swiss People's Party a second seat in the governing cabinet, the Parliament altered the coalition that had dominated Swiss politics since 1959.

Switzerland was the last Western republic (the Principality of Liechtenstein followed in 1984) to grant women the right to vote. Some Swiss cantons approved this in 1959, while at the federal level, it was achieved in 1971 and, after resistance, in the last canton Appenzell Innerrhoden (one of only two remaining Landsgemeinde, along with Glarus) in 1990. After obtaining suffrage at the federal level, women quickly rose in political significance. The first woman on the seven-member Federal Council executive was Elisabeth Kopp, who served from 1984 to 1989, and the first female president was Ruth Dreifuss in 1999.

In 1979 areas from the canton of Bern attained independence from the Bernese, forming the new canton of Jura. On 18 April 1999, the Swiss population and the cantons voted in favour of a completely revised federal constitution.

In 2002 Switzerland became a full member of the United Nations, leaving Vatican City as the last widely recognised state without full UN membership. Switzerland is a founding member of the EFTA but not the European Economic Area (EEA). An application for membership in the European Union was sent in May 1992, but did not advance since rejecting the EEA in December 1992 when Switzerland conducted a referendum on the EEA. Several referendums on the EU issue ensued; due to opposition from the citizens, the membership application was withdrawn. Nonetheless, Swiss law is gradually changing to conform with that of the EU, and the government signed bilateral agreements with the European Union. Switzerland, together with Liechtenstein, has been surrounded by the EU since Austria's entry in 1995. On 5 June 2005, Swiss voters agreed by a 55% majority to join the Schengen treaty, a result that EU commentators regarded as a sign of support. In September 2020, a referendum calling for a vote to end the pact that allowed a free movement of people from the EU was introduced by the Swiss People's Party (SVP). However, voters rejected the attempt to retake control of immigration, defeating the motion by a roughly 63%–37% margin.

On 9 February 2014, 50.3% of Swiss voters approved a ballot initiative launched by the Swiss People's Party (SVP/UDC) to restrict immigration. This initiative was mostly backed by rural (57.6% approval) and suburban groups (51.2% approval), and isolated towns (51.3% approval) as well as by a strong majority (69.2% approval) in Ticino, while metropolitan centres (58.5% rejection) and the French-speaking part (58.5% rejection) rejected it. In December 2016, a political compromise with the EU was attained that eliminated quotas on EU citizens, but still allowed favourable treatment of Swiss-based job applicants. On 27 September 2020, 62% of Swiss voters rejected the anti-free movement referendum by SVP.

== Geography ==
Physical map of Switzerland (in German)

Extending across the north and south side of the Alps in west-central Europe, Switzerland encompasses diverse landscapes and climates across its 41,291 square kilometres (15,943 sq mi).

Switzerland lies between latitudes 45° and 48° N, and longitudes 5° and 11° E. It contains three basic topographical areas: the Swiss Alps to the south, the Swiss Plateau or Central Plateau, and the Jura Mountains on the west. The Alps are a mountain range running across the central and south of the country, constituting about 60% of the country's area. The majority of the population live on the Swiss Plateau. The Swiss Alps host many glaciers, covering 1,063 square kilometres (410 mi^{2}). From these originate the headwaters of several major rivers, such as the Rhine, Inn, Ticino and Rhône, which flow in the four cardinal directions, spreading across Europe. The hydrographic network includes several of the largest bodies of fresh water in Central and Western Europe, among which are Lake Geneva (Lac Léman in French), Lake Constance (Bodensee in German) and Lake Maggiore. Switzerland has more than 1500 lakes and contains 6% of Europe's freshwater stock. Lakes and glaciers cover about 6% of the national territory. Lake Geneva is the largest lake and is shared with France. The Rhône is both the main source and outflow of Lake Geneva. Lake Constance is the second largest and, like Lake Geneva, an intermediate step by the Rhine at the border with Austria and Germany. While the Rhône flows into the Mediterranean Sea at the French Camargue region and the Rhine flows into the North Sea at Rotterdam, about 1,000 kilometres (620 miles) apart, both springs are only about 22 kilometres (14 miles) apart in the Swiss Alps. 90% of Switzerland's 65,000-kilometre-long network of rivers and streams have been straightened, dammed, canalized or channelled underground, in an effort to prevent natural disasters such as flooding, landslides, and avalanches. 80% of all Swiss drinking water comes from groundwater sources.

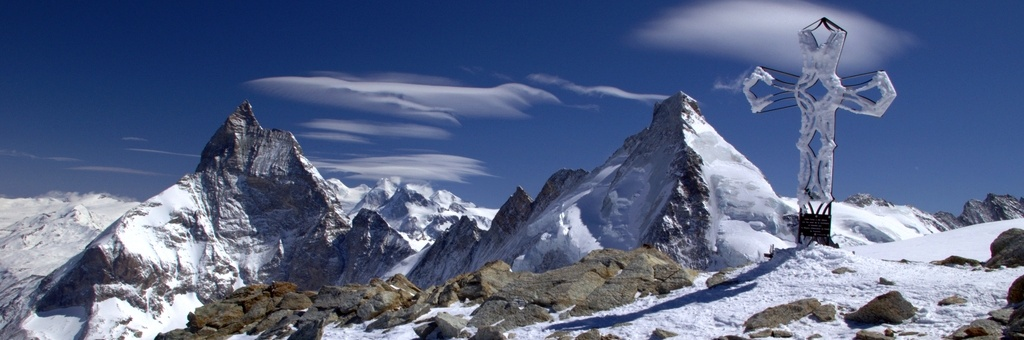

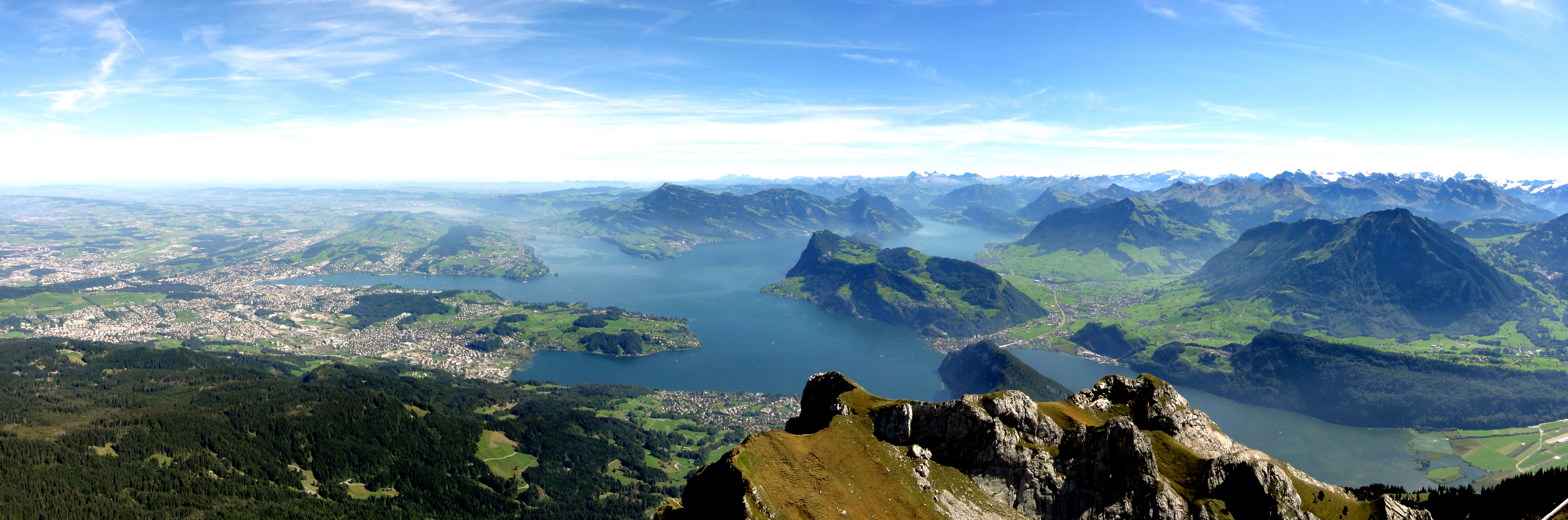
Contrasted landscapes between the regions of the Matterhorn and Lake Lucerne

Forty-eight mountains are 4,000 metres (13,000 ft) or higher in height. At 4,634 m (15,203 ft), Monte Rosa is the highest, although the Matterhorn (4,478 m or 14,692 ft) is the best known. Both are located within the Pennine Alps in the canton of Valais, on the border with Italy. The section of the Bernese Alps above the deep glacial Lauterbrunnen valley, containing 72 waterfalls, is well known for the Jungfrau (4,158 m or 13,642 ft) Eiger and Mönch peaks, and its many picturesque valleys. In the southeast the long Engadin Valley, encompassing St. Moritz, is also well known; the highest peak in the neighbouring Bernina Alps is Piz Bernina (4,049 m or 13,284 ft).

The Swiss Plateau has greater open and hilly landscapes, partly forested, partly open pastures, usually with grazing herds or vegetable and fruit fields, but it is still hilly. Large lakes and the biggest Swiss cities are found there.

Switzerland contains two small enclaves: Büsingen belongs to Germany, while Campione d'Italia belongs to Italy. Switzerland has no exclaves.

=== Climate ===
Köppen–Geiger climate classification map for Switzerland

The Swiss climate is generally temperate, but can vary greatly across localities, from glacial conditions on the mountaintops to the near-Mediterranean climate at Switzerland's southern tip. Some valley areas in the southern part of Switzerland offer cold-hardy palm trees, for example, the dwarf palm or the Chinese hemp palm. Summers tend to be warm and humid at times with periodic rainfall, ideal for pastures/grazing. The less humid winters in the mountains may see weeks-long intervals of stable conditions. At the same time, the lower lands tend to suffer from inversion during such periods, hiding the sun.

A weather phenomenon known as the föhn (with an identical effect to the chinook wind) can occur any time and is characterised by an unexpectedly warm wind, bringing low relative humidity air to the north of the Alps during rainfall periods south of the main Alpine ridge. This works both ways across the alps but is more efficient if blowing from the south due to the steeper step for oncoming wind. Valleys running south to north trigger the strongest effect. The driest conditions persist in all inner alpine valleys that receive less rain because arriving clouds lose a lot of their moisture content while crossing the mountains before reaching these areas. Large alpine areas such as Graubünden remain drier than pre-alpine areas, and as in the main valley of the Valais, wine grapes are grown there.

The wettest conditions persist in the high Alps and in the Ticino canton, which has much sun yet heavy bursts of rain from time to time. Precipitation tends to be spread moderately throughout the year, with a peak in summer. Autumn is the driest season, winter receives less precipitation than summer, yet the weather patterns in Switzerland are not in a stable climate system. They can vary from year to year with no strict and predictable periods.

=== Climate change ===
Global warming has changed the climate in Switzerland, and extreme weather events, including heat waves and heavy rainfall, have become more frequent. Since the pre-industrial period of 1871–1900, the national average temperature has risen by 2.9 °C, more than twice the global average. Since 1971, warming has increased continuously every decade. The nationwide average annual temperature in 2022 reached 7.4 °C (1.6 °C above the 1991–2020 norm), the highest value since measurements began in 1864. The nine warmest years in Switzerland were all recorded after 2010, with 2022 being the hottest year, followed by 2023, 2024, 2018 and 2020.

=== Environment ===
Switzerland contains two terrestrial ecoregions: Western European broadleaf forests and Alps conifer and mixed forests.

Switzerland's many small valleys separated by high mountains often host unique ecologies. The mountainous regions themselves offer a rich range of plants not found at other altitudes. The climatic, geological and topographical conditions of the alpine region make for a fragile ecosystem that is particularly sensitive to climate change. According to the 2014 Environmental Performance Index, Switzerland ranks first among 132 nations in safeguarding the environment, due to its high scores on environmental public health, its heavy reliance on renewable sources of energy (hydropower and geothermal energy), and its level of greenhouse gas emissions. In 2020 it was ranked third out of 180 countries. The country pledged to cut GHG emissions by 50% by 2030 compared to the level of 1990 and plans to reach zero emissions by 2050.

However, access to biocapacity in Switzerland is far lower than the world average. In 2016, Switzerland had 1.0 hectares of biocapacity per person within its territory, 40 per cent less than world average of 1.6. In contrast, in 2016, Swiss consumption required 4.6 hectares of biocapacity – their ecological footprint, 4.6 times as much as Swiss territory can support. The remainder comes from other countries and the shared resources (such as the atmosphere impacted by greenhouse gas emissions). Switzerland had a 2019 Forest Landscape Integrity Index mean score of 3.53/10, ranking it 150th globally out of 172 countries.

Switzerland ranked 9th in the Environmental Performance Index for 2024. It scored well in parameters including air pollution, sanitation and drinking water, waste management, and climate change mitigation.

=== Urbanisation ===
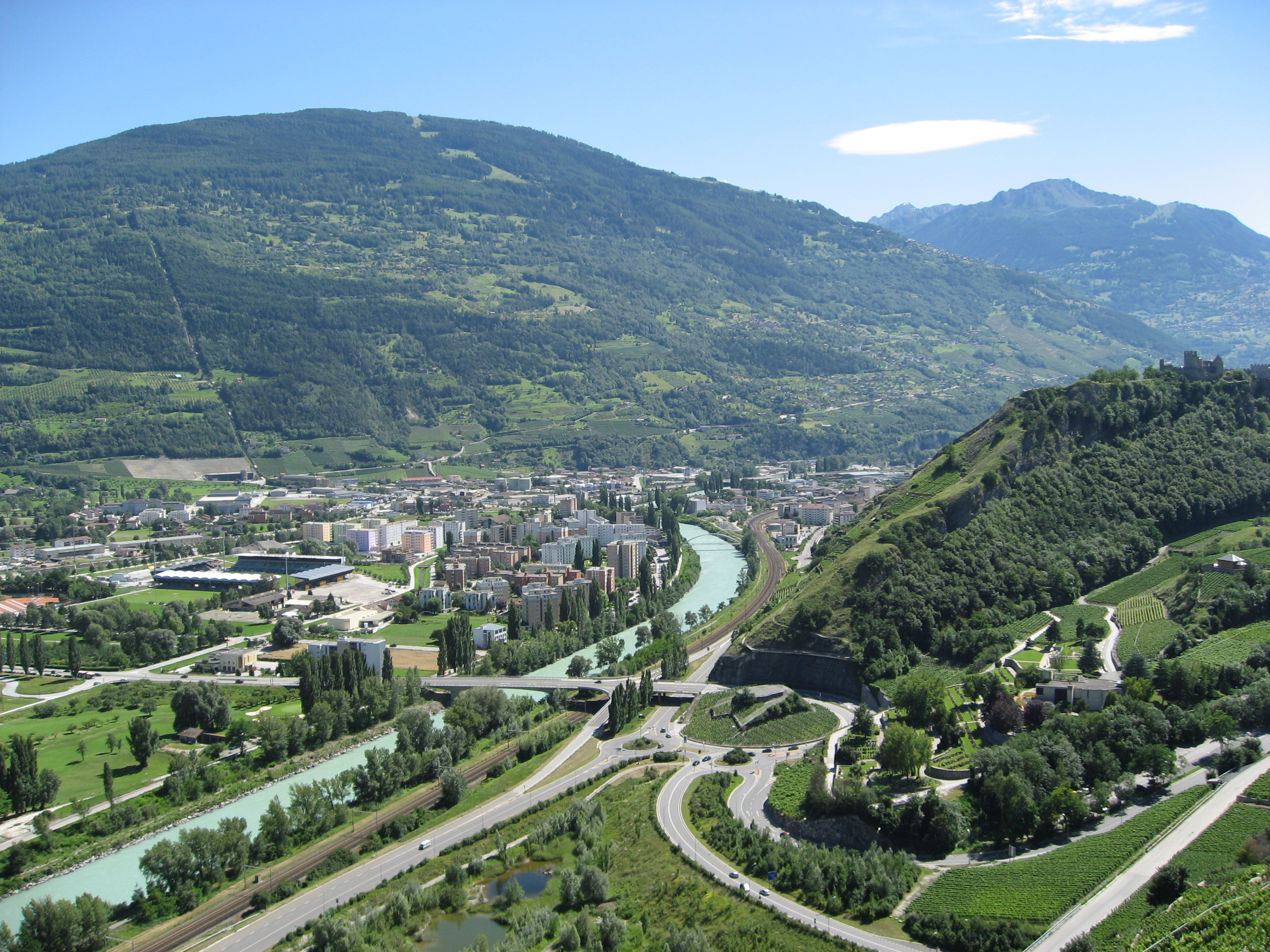
Urbanisation in the Rhone Valley (outskirts of Sion)

About 85% of the population live in urban areas. Switzerland went from a largely rural country to an urban one from 1930 to 2000. After 1935 urban development claimed as much of the Swiss landscape as it did during the prior 2,000 years. Urban sprawl affects the plateau, the Jura and the Alpine foothills, raising concerns about land use. During the 21st century, population growth in urban areas is higher than in the countryside.

Switzerland has a dense network of complementary large, medium and small towns. The plateau is densely populated with about 400 people per km^{2} and the landscape shows uninterrupted signs of human presence. The weight of the largest metropolitan areas – Zurich, Geneva–Lausanne, Basel and Bern – tend to increase. The importance of these urban areas is greater than their population suggests. These urban centres are recognised for their high quality of life.

The average population density in 2019 was 215.2 inhabitants per square kilometre (557/sq mi). In the largest canton by area, Graubünden, lying entirely in the Alps, population density falls to 28.0 inhabitants per square kilometre (73/sq mi). In the canton of Zurich, with its large urban capital, the density is 926.8 per square kilometre (2,400/sq mi).

== Government and politics ==
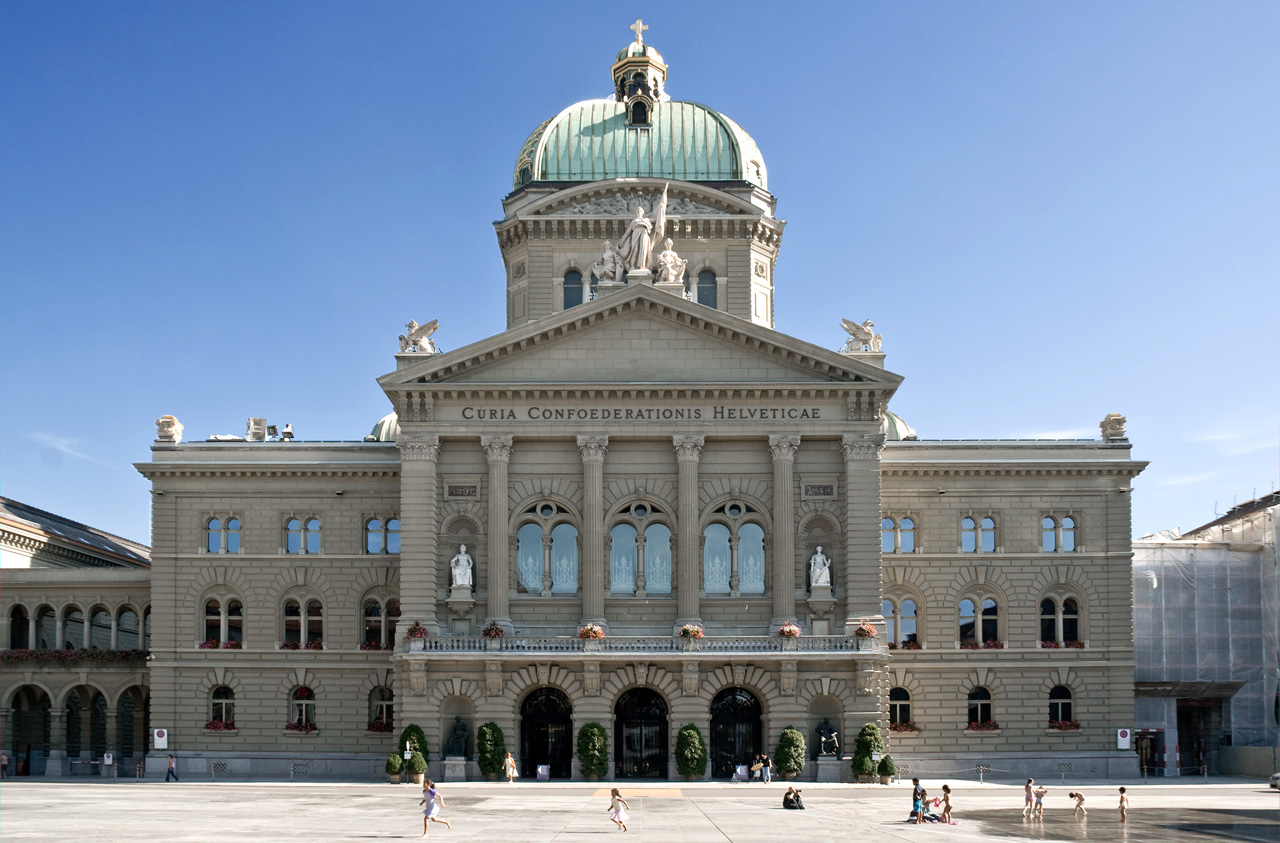
The Federal Palace, seat of the Federal Assembly and the Federal Council

According to International IDEA's Global State of Democracy (GSoD) Indices and Democracy Tracker, Switzerland performs in the high range on overall democratic measures, with particular weaknesses in electoral participation.

The Federal Constitution adopted in 1848 is the legal foundation of Switzerland's federal state. It is regularly modified by referendum and has been completely revised twice, in 1874 and 1999. The constitution outlines rights of individuals and citizen participation in public affairs, divides the powers between the confederation and the cantons and defines federal jurisdiction and authority. Three main bodies govern on the federal level: the Federal Assembly (legislative), the Federal Council (executive) and the federal courts (judicial).

=== Federal Assembly ===
The Federal Assembly is the parliament of Switzerland. It consists of two houses: The Council of States has 46 members, two from each canton and one from each half-canton. The National Council has 200 members, apportioned to reflect the population of each canton, and elected by proportional representation within each canton. Members of both houses serve for four years and work part-time (Milizsystem). When both houses are in joint session, they are known collectively as the Federal Assembly. Through optional referendums, citizens may challenge any law passed by parliament.

=== Federal Council ===
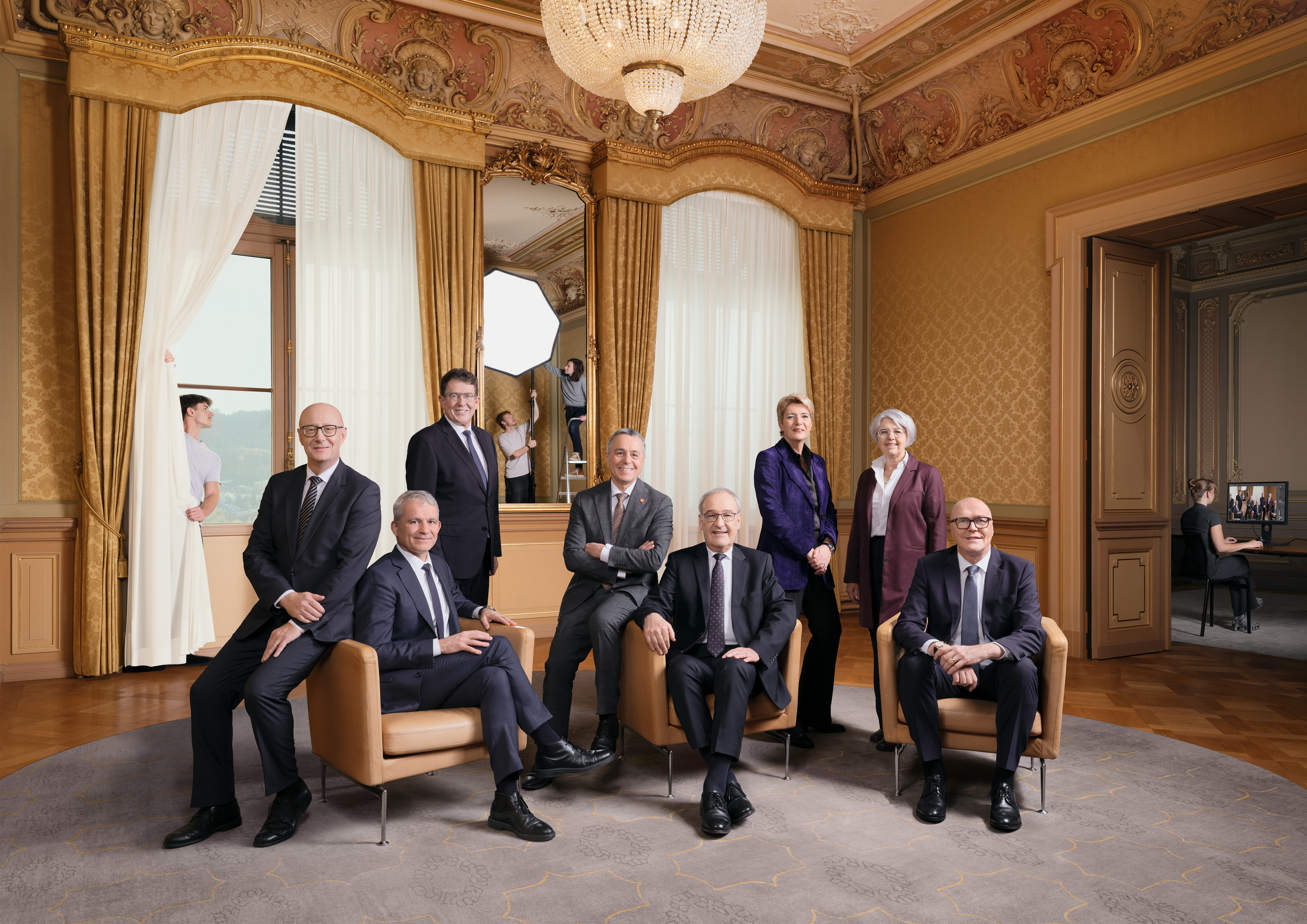
The official photo of the Swiss Federal Council in 2026 (from left to right): Viktor Rossi (Federal chancellor) Beat Jans Albert Rösti Ignazio Cassis (Vice president in 2026) Guy Parmelin (President in 2026) Karin Keller-Sutter Elisabeth Baume-Schneider Martin Pfister

The Federal Council is the Swiss executive. It leads the federal administration and serves as a collective head of state. It is a collegial body of seven members, elected to four-year terms by the Federal Assembly, which oversees the council. Each member leads a department of the federal government. Each year, one member of the Council is elected President of the Confederation by the Assembly, with the presidency traditionally rotating between members. The president chairs and represents the government, but has no additional powers and remains the head of their department.

The government has been a coalition of the four major political parties since 1959, each party having a number of seats that roughly reflects its share of the electorate and representation in the federal parliament. This distribution is called the "magic formula". Since 2003, the seven seats in the Federal Council have been distributed as follows:

- 1 seat for the Centre (Note: Formerly the Christian Democratic People's Party (CVP/PCD), which merged with the BDP party to form the Centre party in 2019)
- 2 seats for the Free Democratic Party (FDP/PRD)
- 2 seats for the Social Democratic Party (SP/PS)
- 2 seats for the Swiss People's Party (SVP/UDC) (Note: The Conservative Democratic Party held both SVP seats from 2003 to 2008, and continued to hold one SVP seat until 2015.)

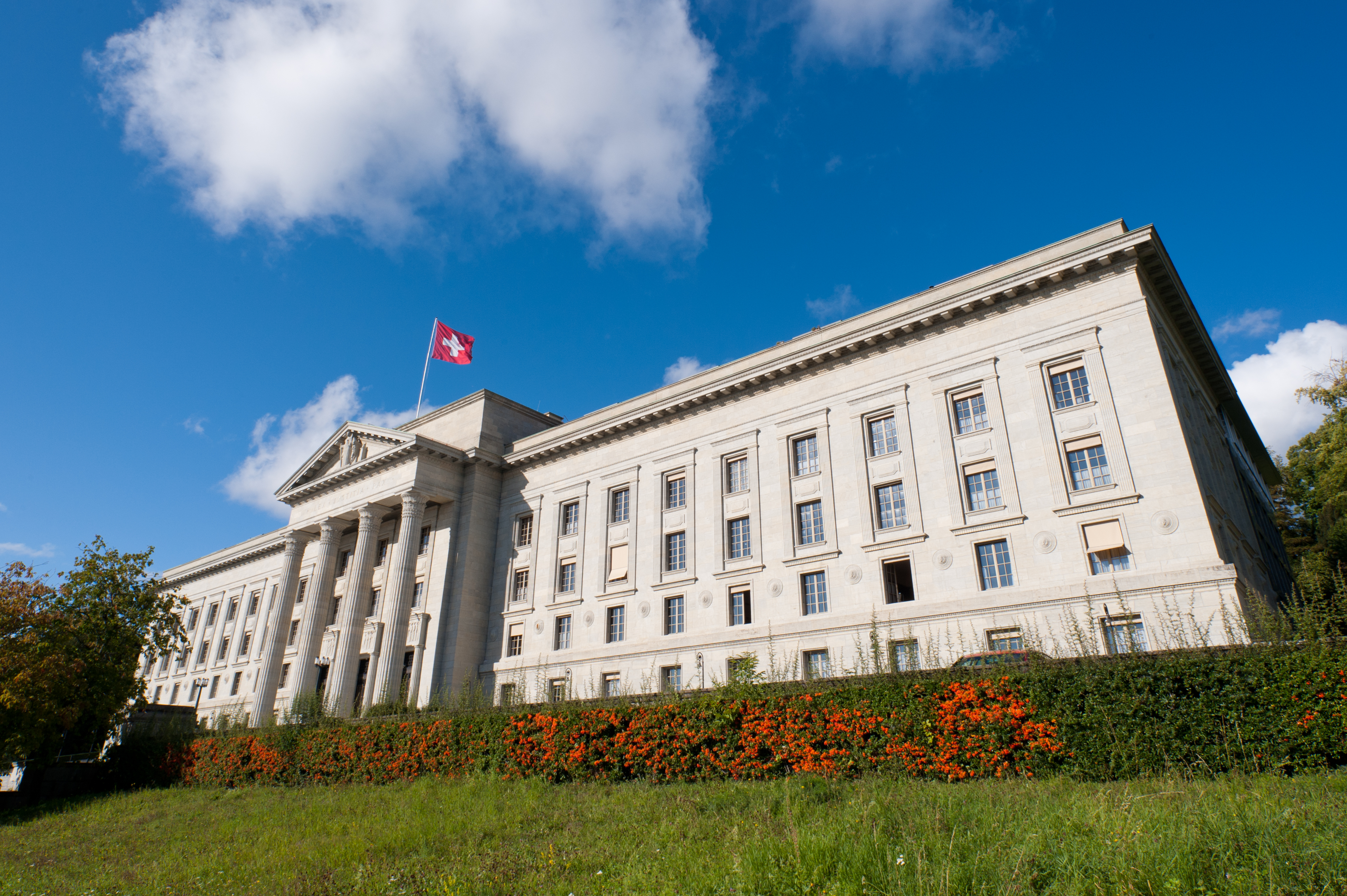
Federal Supreme Court of Switzerland building in Lausanne

=== Supreme Court ===
The function of the Federal Supreme Court is to hear appeals against rulings of cantonal or federal courts. The judges are elected by the Federal Assembly for six-year terms.

=== Direct democracy ===
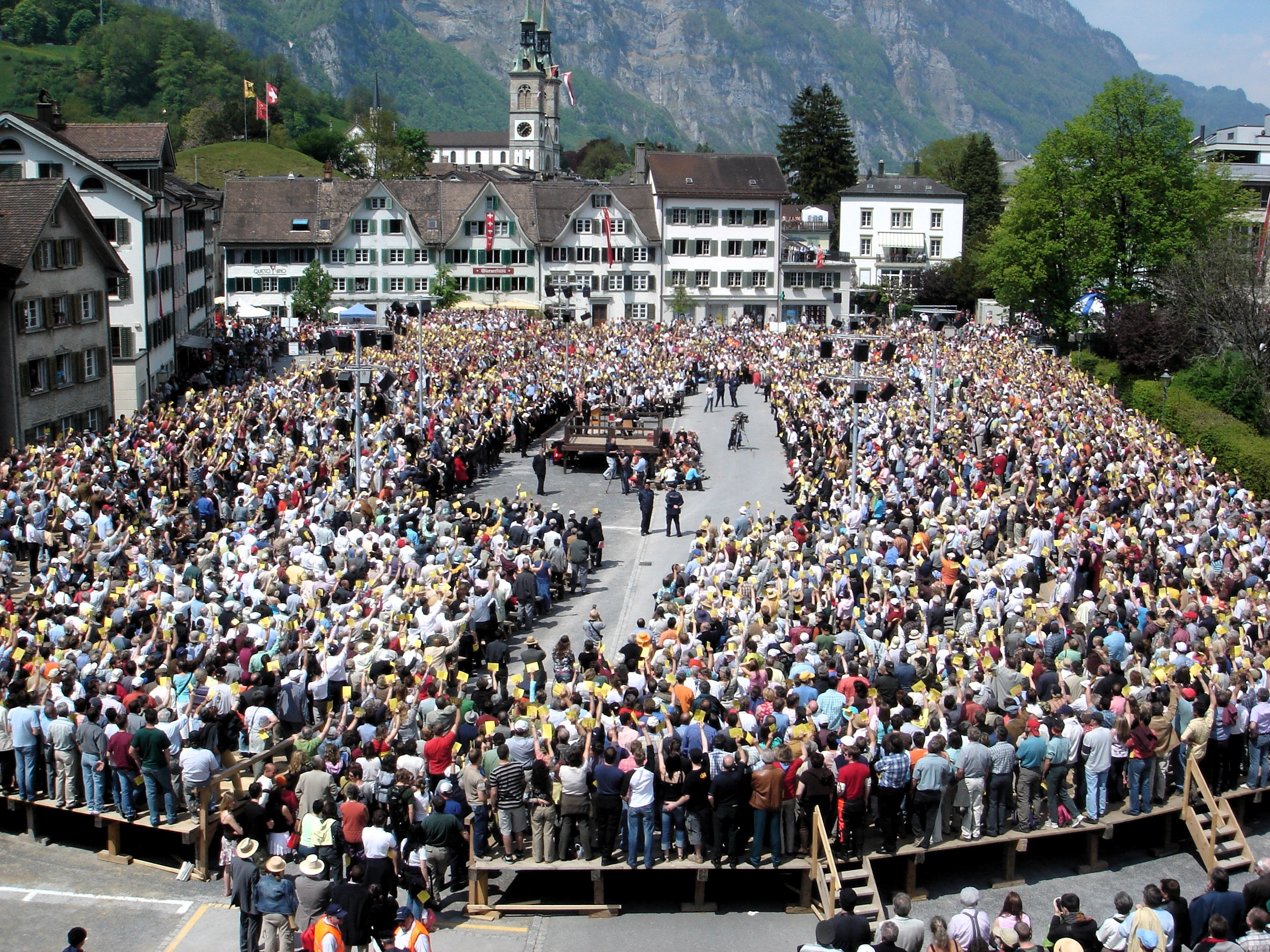
The Landsgemeinde is an old form of direct democracy, still in practice in two cantons.

Direct democracy and federalism are hallmarks of the Swiss political system defined in the Swiss constitution. The Swiss people are subject to three legal jurisdictions: the municipal, cantonal and federal levels. At the federal level, popular rights (Note: German: Volksrechte; French: droits populaires; Italian: diritti popolari) include the right to submit a federal initiative and a referendum, both of which may overturn parliamentary decisions.

There are three types of federal referendum in Switzerland:

- An optional referendum challenges a law passed by parliament. It requires gathering 50,000 signatures or the objection of eight cantons within 100 days. Voters decide by a simple majority whether to accept or reject the law.
- A mandatory referendum is required for all constitutional amendments passed by the Federal Assembly. Constitutional amendments require a double majority, i.e. both a majority of the national popular vote and a majority of cantonal votes. (Note: Each of the six traditional half-cantons gets half a vote, and the other 20 cantons get one full vote, adding up to 23 cantonal votes. Each vote or half-vote is selected based on the votes of their citizens.)
- A popular initiative is an amendment to the constitution proposed by citizens. (Note: Since 1999, an initiative can also be in the form of a general proposal to be elaborated by Parliament. Still, because it is considered less attractive for various reasons, this initiative has yet to be used.) A petition supporting the initiative must be signed by 100,000 voters within 18 months for a referendum to be held. Popular initiatives also require a double majority to pass.

The Federal Council and the Federal Assembly can supplement a popular initiative with a counterproposal. Voters must then indicate their preference if both proposals are accepted.

=== Cantons ===
The Swiss Confederation consists of 26 cantons. The cantons are federated states, with permanent constitutional status and a high degree of independence relative to the subnational divisions of most countries. Under the Federal Constitution, all 26 cantons are equal in status, except that six (referred to often as the half-cantons) are represented by one councillor instead of two in the Council of States and have only half a cantonal vote with respect to the required cantonal majority in referendums on constitutional amendments. Each canton has its own constitution and its own parliament, government, police and courts. However, considerable differences define the individual cantons, particularly in terms of population and geographical area. Their populations vary between 16,003 (Appenzell Innerrhoden) and 1,487,969 (Zurich), and their area between 37 km^{2} (14 sq mi) (Basel-Stadt) and 7,105 km^{2} (2,743 sq mi) (Grisons).

Canton	ID	Capital	Canton	ID	Capital
Aargau	19	Aarau	*Nidwalden	7	Stans
*Appenzell Ausserrhoden	15	Herisau	*Obwalden	6	Sarnen
*Appenzell Innerrhoden	16	Appenzell	Schaffhausen	14	Schaffhausen
*Basel-Landschaft	13	Liestal	Schwyz	5	Schwyz
*Basel-Stadt	12	Basel	Solothurn	11	Solothurn
Bern	2	Bern	St. Gallen	17	St. Gallen
Fribourg	10	Fribourg	Thurgau	20	Frauenfeld
Geneva	25	Geneva	Ticino	21	Bellinzona
Glarus	8	Glarus	Uri	4	Altdorf
Grisons	18	Chur	Valais	23	Sion
Jura	26	Delémont	Vaud	22	Lausanne
Lucerne	3	Lucerne	Zug	9	Zug
Neuchâtel	24	Neuchâtel	Zurich	1	Zurich

*These cantons are known as half-cantons.

==== Municipalities ====
As of 2026 the cantons comprised 2,110 municipalities.

=== Federal City ===
Until 1848, the loosely coupled Confederation did not have a central political organisation. Issues thought to affect the whole Confederation were the subject of periodic meetings in various locations.

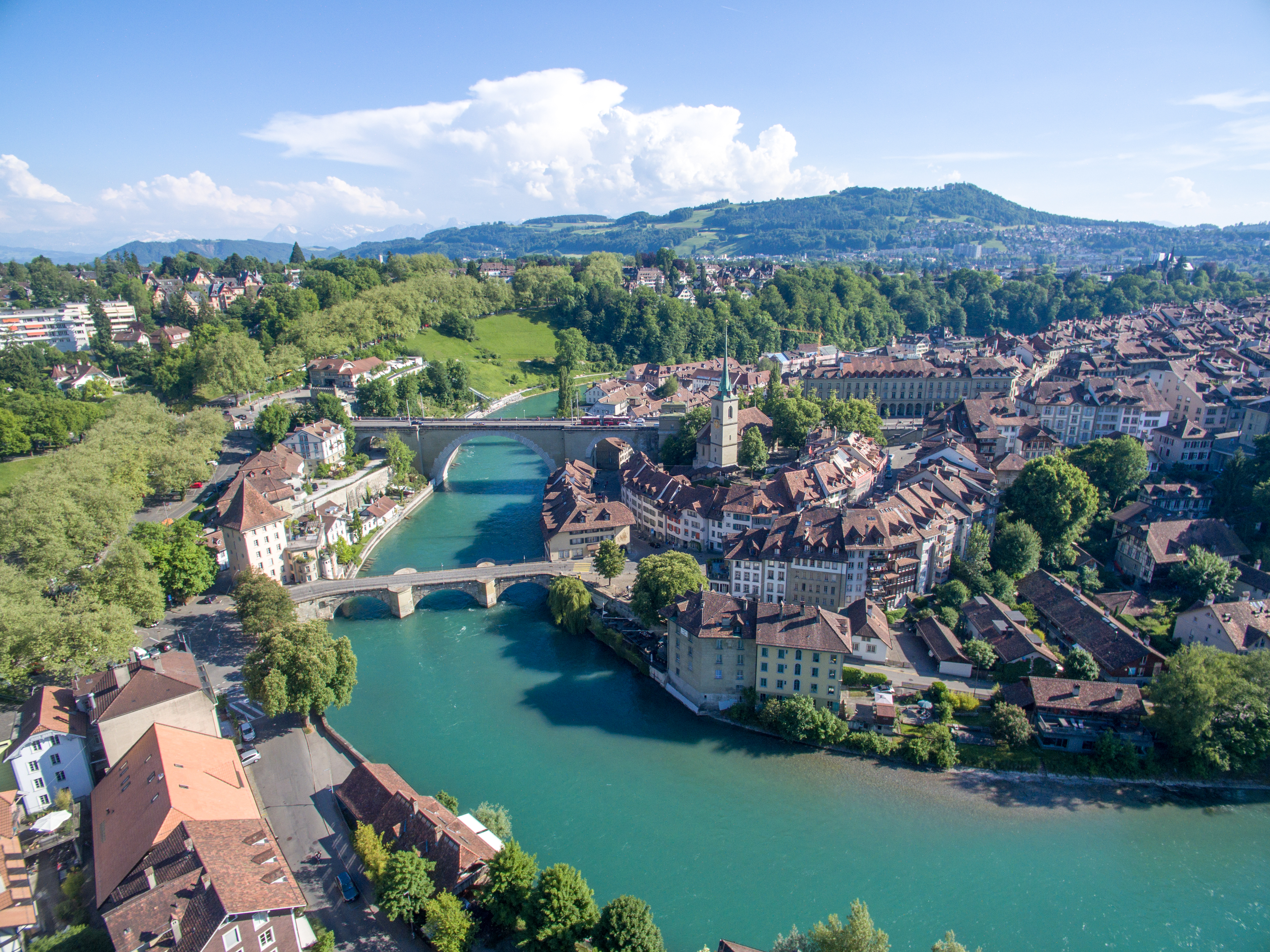
The Old City of Bern

In 1848, the federal constitution provided that details concerning federal institutions, such as their locations, should be addressed by the Federal Assembly (BV 1848 Art. 108). Thus on 28 November 1848, the Federal Assembly voted in the majority to locate the seat of government in Bern and, as a prototypical federal compromise, to assign other federal institutions, such as the Federal Polytechnical School (1854, the later ETH) to Zurich, and other institutions to Lucerne, such as the later SUVA (1912) and the Federal Insurance Court (1917). Other federal institutions were subsequently attributed to Lausanne (Federal Supreme Court in 1872, and EPFL in 1969), Bellinzona (Federal Criminal Court, 2004), and St. Gallen (Federal Administrative Court and Federal Patent Court, 2012).

The 1999 Constitution does not mention a Federal City, and the Federal Council has yet to address the matter. Thus no city in Switzerland has the official status either of capital or of Federal City. Nevertheless, Bern is commonly referred to as "Federal City" (German: Bundesstadt, French: ville fédérale, Italian: città federale). However the largest city, Zurich, is used when selecting a time zone on computer systems.

=== Foreign relations ===
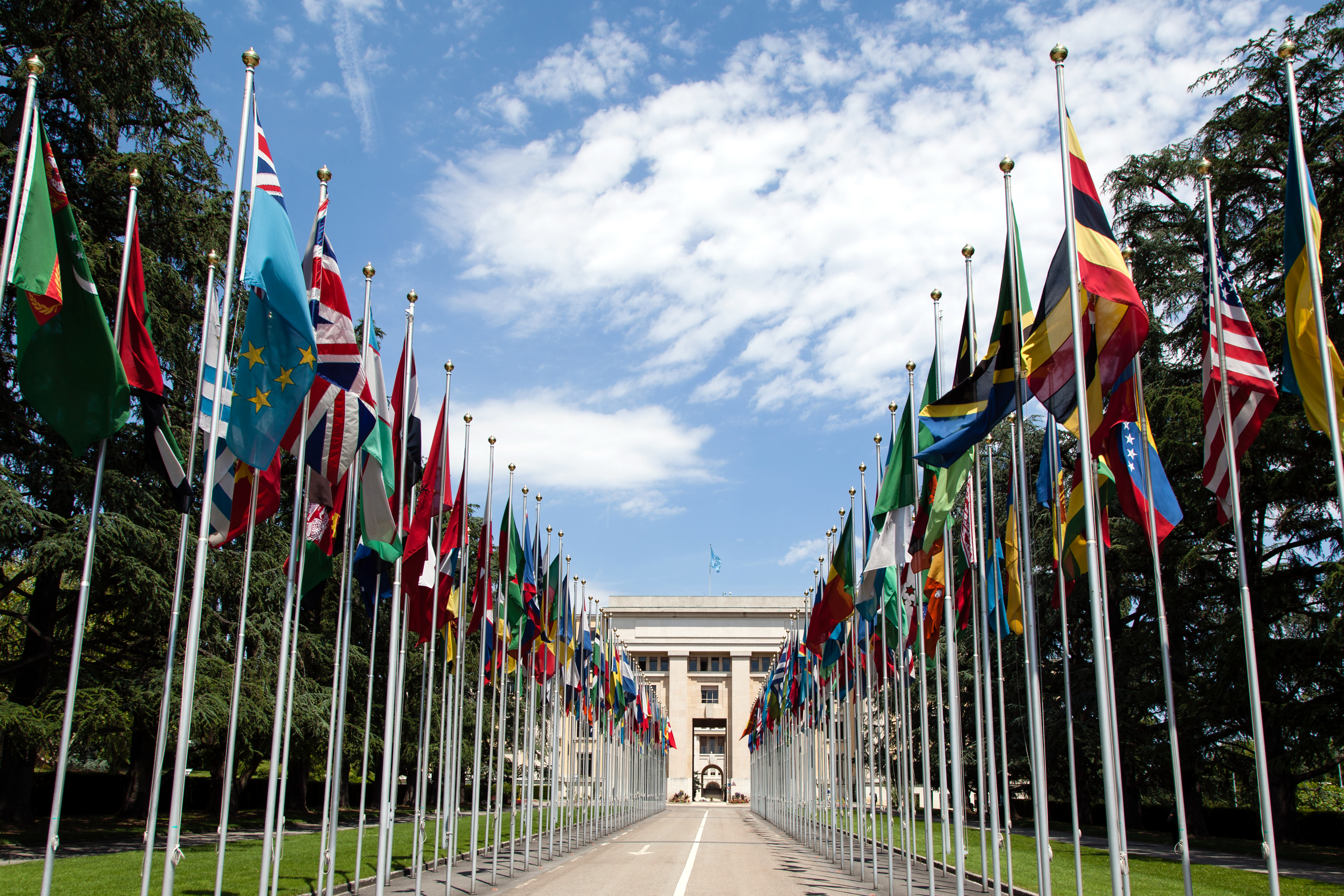
The Palace of Nations, the European headquarters of the United Nations in Geneva

Traditionally, Switzerland avoids alliances that might entail military, political, or direct economic action and has been neutral since the end of its expansion in 1515. Its policy of neutrality was internationally recognised at the Congress of Vienna in 1815. Swiss neutrality has been questioned at times. In 2002 Switzerland became a full member of the United Nations. It was the first state to join it by referendum. Switzerland maintains diplomatic relations with almost all countries and historically has served as an intermediary between other states. Switzerland is not a member of the European Union; the Swiss people have consistently rejected membership since the early 1990s. However, Switzerland does participate in the Schengen Area.

The colour-reversed Swiss flag became the symbol of the Red Cross Movement, founded in 1863 by Henry Dunant.

Many international institutions have headquarters in Switzerland, in part because of its policy of neutrality. Geneva is the birthplace of the Red Cross and Red Crescent Movement, the Geneva Conventions and, since 2006, hosts the United Nations Human Rights Council. Even though Switzerland is one of the most recent countries to join the United Nations, the Palace of Nations in Geneva is the second biggest centre for the United Nations after the headquarters in New York. Switzerland was a founding member and hosted the League of Nations.

Apart from the United Nations headquarters, the Swiss Confederation is host to many UN agencies, including the World Health Organization (WHO), the International Labour Organization (ILO), the International Telecommunication Union (ITU), the United Nations High Commissioner for Refugees (UNHCR) and about 200 other international organisations, including the World Trade Organization and the World Intellectual Property Organization. The annual meetings of the World Economic Forum in Davos bring together business and political leaders from Switzerland and foreign countries to discuss important issues. The headquarters of the Bank for International Settlements (BIS) moved to Basel in 1930.

Many sports federations and organisations are located in the country, including the International Handball Federation in Basel, the International Basketball Federation in Geneva, the Union of European Football Associations (UEFA) in Nyon, the International Federation of Association Football (FIFA) and the International Ice Hockey Federation both in Zurich, the International Cycling Union in Aigle, and the International Olympic Committee in Lausanne.

Switzerland became a member of the United Nations Security Council for the 2023–2024 period. According to the 2024 Global Peace Index, Switzerland is the 6th most peaceful country in the world.

==== Switzerland and the European Union ====
Although not a member, Switzerland maintains relationships with the EU and European countries through bilateral agreements. The Swiss have brought their economic practices largely into conformity with those of the EU, in an effort to compete internationally. EU membership faces considerable negative popular sentiment. It is opposed by the conservative SVP party, the largest party in the National Council, and not advocated by several other political parties. The membership application was formally withdrawn in 2016. The western French-speaking areas and the urban regions of the rest of the country tend to be more pro-EU, but do not form a significant share of the population.

Members of the European Free Trade Association (green) participate in the European single market and are part of the Schengen Area.

An Integration Office operates under the Department of Foreign Affairs and the Department of Economic Affairs. Seven bilateral agreements liberalised trade ties, taking effect in 2001. This first series of bilateral agreements included the free movement of persons. A second series of agreements covering nine areas was signed in 2004, including the Schengen Treaty and the Dublin Convention.

In 2006, a referendum approved 1 billion francs of supportive investment in Southern and Central European countries in support of positive ties to the EU as a whole. A further referendum will be needed to approve 300 million francs to support Romania and Bulgaria and their recent admission.

The Swiss have faced EU and international pressure to reduce banking secrecy and raise tax rates to parity with the EU. Preparatory discussions involved four areas: the electricity market, participation in project Galileo, cooperating with the European Centre for Disease Prevention and Control and certificates of origin for food products.

Switzerland is a member of the Schengen passport-free zone. Land border checkpoints monitor goods movements, but not people.

=== Military ===
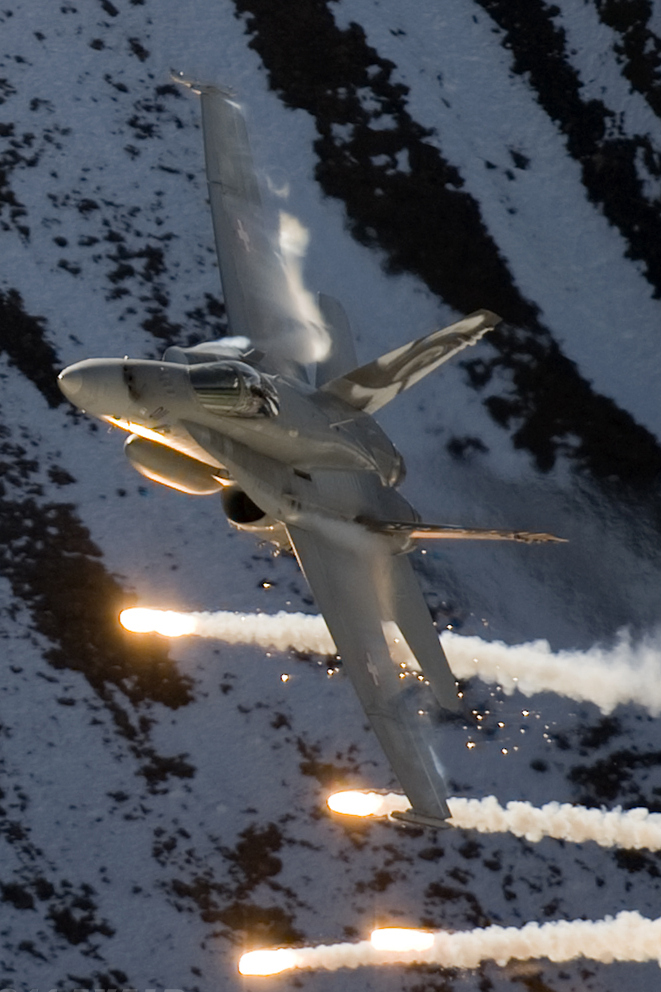
A Swiss Air Force F/A-18 Hornet at Axalp Air Show

The Swiss Armed Forces, including the Land Forces and the Air Force, are composed mostly of conscripts, male citizens aged from 20 to 34 (in exceptional cases up to 50) years. Being a landlocked country, Switzerland has no navy; however, on lakes bordering neighbouring countries, armed boats patrol. Swiss citizens are prohibited from serving in foreign armies, except for the Swiss Guards of the Vatican, or if they are dual citizens of a foreign country and reside there.

The Swiss militia system stipulates that soldiers keep their army-issued equipment, including fully automatic personal weapons, at home. Women can serve voluntarily. Men usually receive military conscription orders for training at the age of 18. About two-thirds of young Swiss are found suitable for service; for the others, various forms of alternative service are available. Annually, approximately 20,000 persons are trained in recruit centres for 18 to 21 weeks. The reform "Army XXI" was adopted by popular vote in 2003, replacing "Army 95", reducing the rolls from 400,000 to about 200,000. Of those, 120,000 are active in periodic Army training, and 80,000 are non-training reserves.

The newest reform of the military, Weiterentwicklung der Armee (WEA; English: Further development of the Army), started in 2018 and was expected to reduce the number of army personnel to 100,000 by the end of 2022.

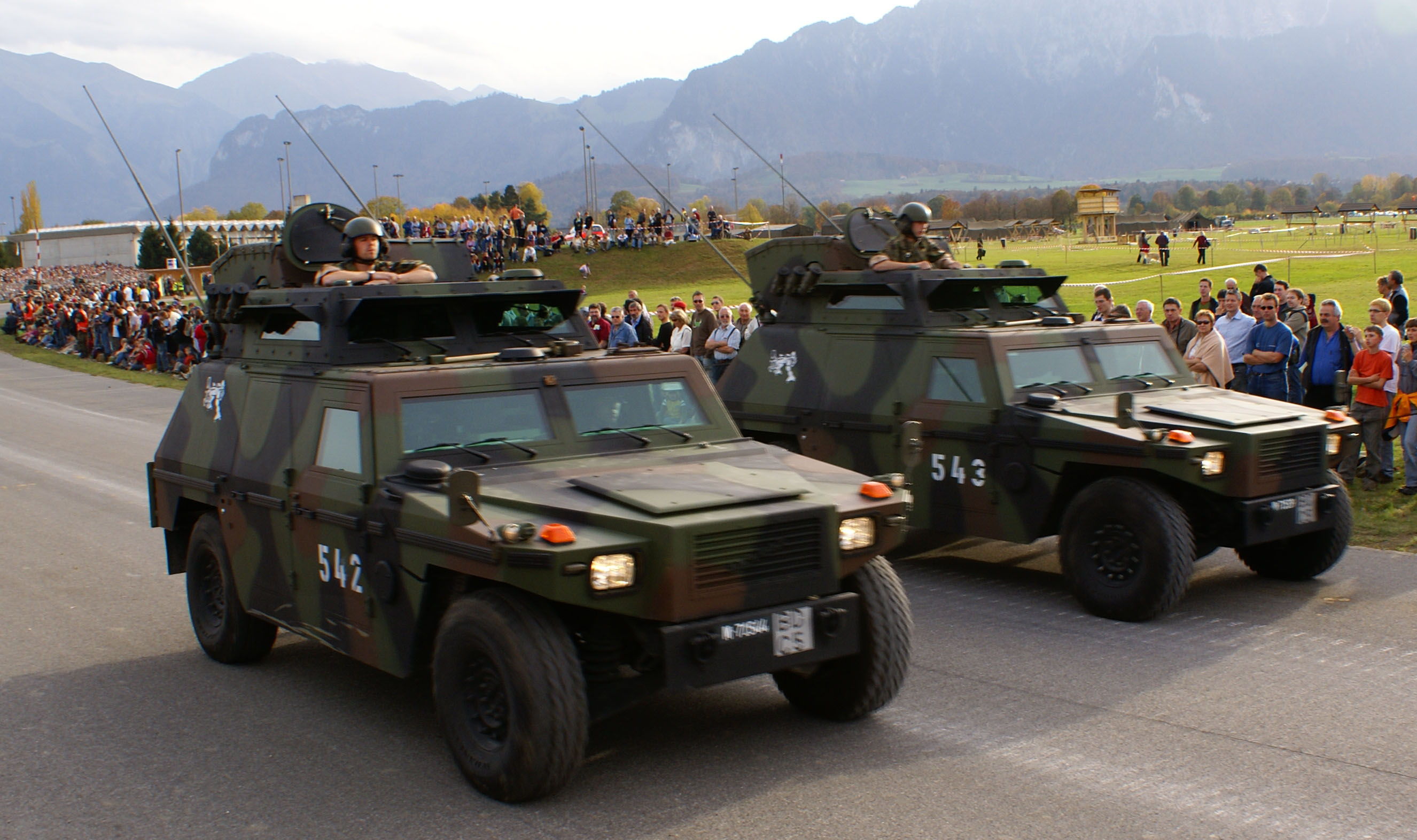
Swiss-built Mowag Eagles of the land forces

Overall, three general mobilisations have been declared to ensure the integrity and neutrality of Switzerland. The first mobilisation was held in response to the Franco-Prussian War of 1870–71; while the second was in response to the First World War outbreak in August 1914; the third mobilisation took place in September 1939 in response to the German attack on Poland.

Because of its neutrality policy, the Swiss army does not take part in armed conflicts in other countries but joins some peacekeeping missions. Since 2000 the armed force department has maintained the Onyx intelligence gathering system to monitor satellite communications.

Gun politics in Switzerland are unique in Europe in that 2–3.5 million guns are in the hands of civilians, giving the nation an estimate of 28–41 guns per 100 people. As per the Small Arms Survey, only 324,484 guns are owned by the military. Only 143,372 are in the hands of soldiers. However, ammunition is no longer issued.

== Economy ==
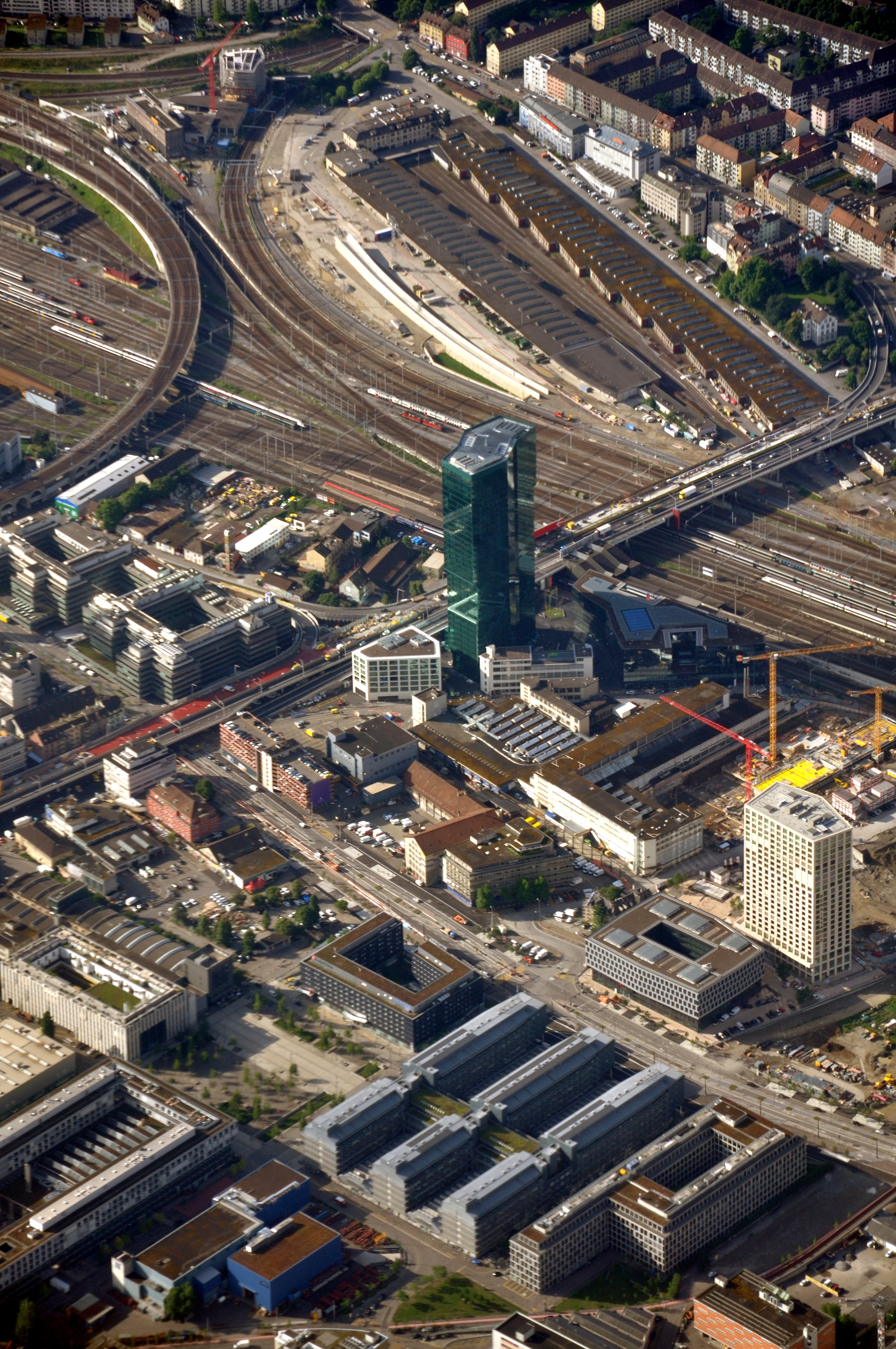
The Greater Zurich Area, home to 1.5 million inhabitants and 150,000 companies, is one of the most important economic centres in the world.

Switzerland has a stable, prosperous and high-tech economy. It is frequently ranked among the world's wealthiest country per capita; for example in 2024 the CIA world factbook ranked Switzerland as having the 10th highest GDP per capita (at purchasing power parity) in the world. The country ranks as one of the least corrupt countries in the world, while its banking sector was rated in 2018 as "one of the most corrupt in the world". It has the world's twentieth largest economy by nominal GDP and the thirty-eighth largest by purchasing power parity. As of 2021, it is the thirteenth largest exporter, and the fifth largest per capita. Zurich and Geneva are regarded as global cities, ranked as Alpha and Beta respectively. Basel is the capital of Switzerland's pharmaceutical industry, hosting Novartis, Roche, and many other players. It is one of the world's most important centres for the life sciences industry.

Switzerland had the second-highest global rating in the Index of Economic Freedom 2023, while also providing significant public services. On a per capita basis, nominal GDP is higher than those of the larger Western and Central European economies and Japan, while adjusted for purchasing power, Switzerland ranked 11th in 2017, fifth in 2018, and ninth in 2020.

Origin of the capital at the 30 biggest Swiss corporations, 2018: (Note: Assumption made in the study: one third of the shares is "not allocable" and has been distributed equally among current regions.)
1. Switzerland (39.0%)
2. North America (33.0%)
3. Europe (24.0%)
4. Rest of the world (4.00%)

The European Union labelled Switzerland Europe's most innovative country. Switzerland retained the top rank as the most innovative country in the Global Innovation Index in 2026, holding the title consecutively since 2019. It ranked 20th of 189 countries in the Ease of Doing Business Index. Switzerland's slow growth in the 1990s and the early 2000s increased support for economic reforms and harmonisation with the European Union. In 2020, IMD placed Switzerland first in attracting skilled workers.

For much of the 20th century, Switzerland was the wealthiest country in Europe by a considerable margin (per capita GDP). Switzerland has one of the world's largest account balances as a percentage of GDP. In 2018, the canton of Basel-City had the highest GDP per capita, ahead of Zug and Geneva. According to Credit Suisse, only about 37% of residents own their own homes, one of the lowest rates of home ownership in Europe. Housing and food price levels were 171% and 145% of the EU-25 index in 2007, compared to 113% and 104% in Germany.

Switzerland is home to several large multinational corporations. The largest by revenue are Glencore, Gunvor, Nestlé, Mediterranean Shipping Company, Novartis, Hoffmann-La Roche, ABB, Mercuria Energy Group and Adecco. Also, notable are UBS, Zurich Insurance, Richemont, Credit Suisse, Barry Callebaut, Swiss Re, Rolex, Tetra Pak, Swatch Group and Swiss International Air Lines.

GDP by canton in 2024

Switzerland's most important economic sector is manufacturing. Manufactured products include speciality chemicals, health and pharmaceutical goods, scientific and precision measuring instruments and musical instruments. The largest exported goods are chemicals (34% of exported goods), machines/electronics (20.9%), and precision instruments/watches (16.9%). The service sector – especially banking and insurance, commodities trading, tourism, and international organisations – is another important industry for Switzerland. Exported services amount to a third of exports.

Agricultural protectionism—a rare exception to Switzerland's free trade policies—contributes to high food prices. Product market liberalisation is lagging behind many EU countries according to the OECD. Apart from agriculture, economic and trade barriers between the European Union and Switzerland are minimal, and Switzerland has free trade agreements with many countries. Switzerland is a member of the European Free Trade Association (EFTA).

Switzerland is considered as the "land of Cooperatives" with the ten largest cooperative companies accounting for more than 11% of GDP in 2018. They include Migros and Coop, the two largest retail companies in Switzerland.

=== Taxation and government spending ===
Switzerland is a tax haven. The private sector economy dominates. It features low tax rates; tax revenue to GDP ratio is one of the smallest of developed countries. The Swiss Federal budget reached 62.8 billion Swiss francs in 2010, 11.35% of GDP; however, canton and municipality budgets are not counted as part of the federal budget. Total government spending is closer to 33.8% of GDP. The main sources of income for the federal government are the value-added tax (33% of tax revenue) and the direct federal tax (29%). The main areas of expenditure are in social welfare and finance/taxes. The expenditures of the Swiss Confederation have been growing from 7% of GDP in 1960 to 9.7% in 1990 and 10.7% in 2010. While the social welfare and finance sectors and tax grew from 35% in 1990 to 48.2% in 2010, a significant reduction of expenditures has been occurring in agriculture and national defence; from 26.5% to 12.4% (estimation for the year 2015).

=== Labour force ===
Slightly more than 5 million people work in Switzerland; about 25% of employees belonged to a trade union in 2004. Switzerland has a more flexible labour market than neighbouring countries and the unemployment rate is consistently low. The unemployment rate increased from 1.7% in June 2000 to 4.4% in December 2009. It then decreased to 3.2% in 2014 and held steady for several years, before further dropping to 2.5% in 2018 and 2.3% in 2019; in 2023 it had reached a 20-year low of 2%. Population growth (from net immigration) reached 0.52% of population in 2004, increased in the following years before falling to 0.54% again in 2017. The foreign citizen population was 28.9% in 2015, about the same as in Australia.

In 2022, the median monthly gross income in Switzerland was 6,788 francs per month (equivalent to US$7,467 per month). After rent, taxes and pension contributions, plus spending on goods and services, the average household has about 15% of its gross income left for savings. Though 61% of the population made less than the mean income, income inequality is relatively low with a Gini coefficient of 29.7, placing Switzerland among the top 20 countries. In 2015, the richest 1% owned 35% of the wealth. Wealth inequality increased through 2019.

About 8.2% of the population live below the national poverty line, defined in Switzerland as earning less than CHF 3,990 per month for a household of two adults and two children, and a further 15% are at risk of poverty. Single-parent families, those with no post-compulsory education and those out of work are among the most likely to live below the poverty line. Although work is considered a way out of poverty, some 4.3% are considered working poor. One in ten jobs in Switzerland is considered low-paid; roughly 12% of Swiss workers hold such jobs, many of them women and foreigners.

=== Science ===
Switzerland is among the countries with the highest number of Nobel laureates, both in total and per capita; of the 28 Swiss nationals who have won the Nobel Prize, 23 were recognised in the sciences. Among the most famous is Albert Einstein, who became a Swiss citizen in 1901 and developed his theory of special relativity in Bern. Among the Nobel laureates born or naturalised in Switzerland are Vladimir Prelog, Heinrich Rohrer, Richard Ernst, Edmond Fischer, Rolf Zinkernagel, Kurt Wüthrich and Jacques Dubochet. Over 100 laureates across all fields have a relationship to Switzerland. (Note: Nobel prizes in non-science categories included) The Nobel Peace Prize has been awarded nine times to organisations headquartered in Switzerland.

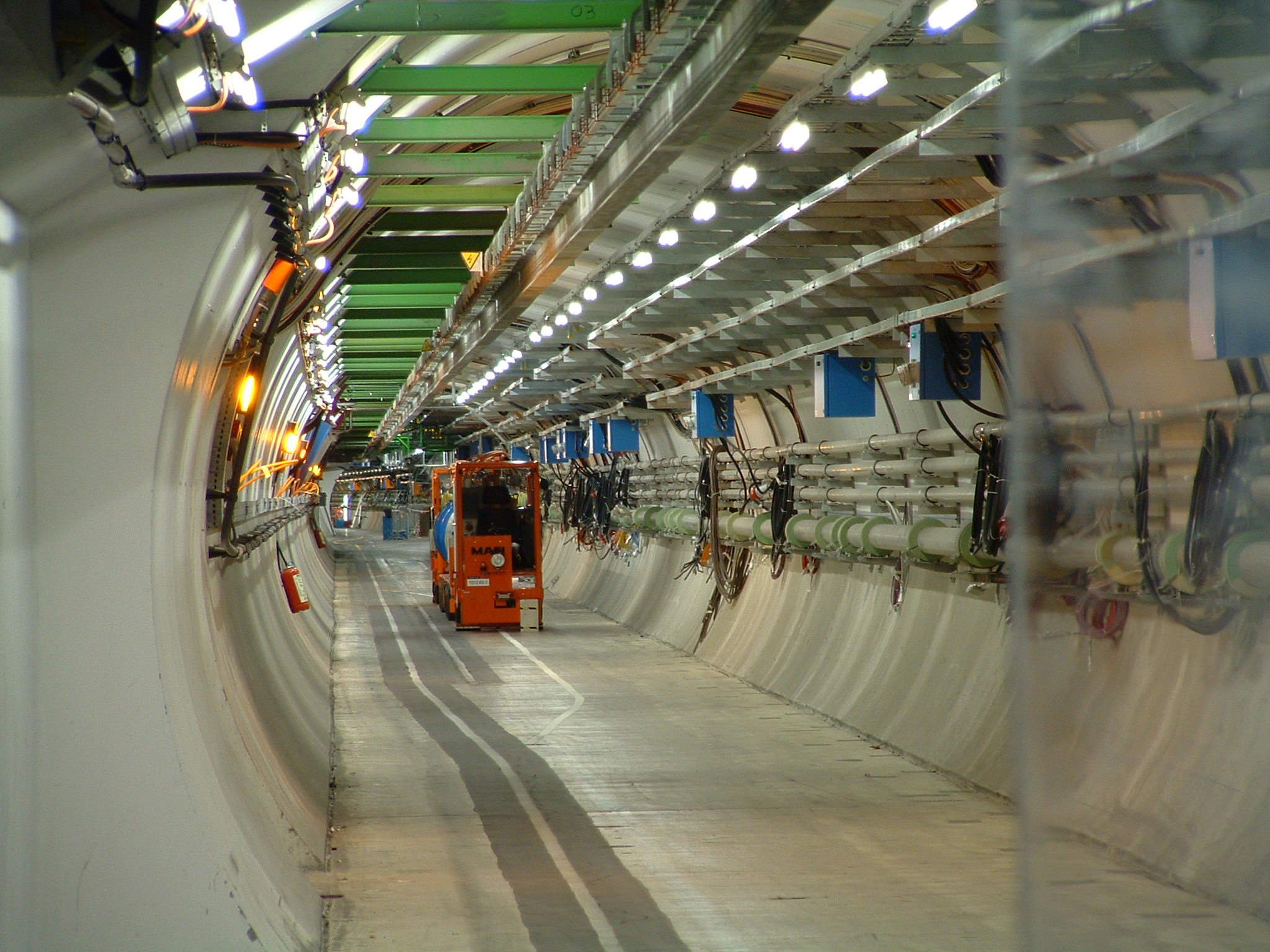
The LHC tunnel. CERN is the world's largest laboratory and also the birthplace of the World Wide Web.

Geneva and the nearby French department of Ain co-host the world's largest laboratory, CERN, dedicated to particle physics research. Another important research centre is the Paul Scherrer Institute, which conducts multi-disciplinary research in the natural and engineering sciences.

Notable Swiss inventions include lysergic acid diethylamide (LSD), diazepam (Valium), Velcro, and the scanning tunnelling microscope, which earned inventors Gerd Binnig and Heinrich Rohrer the 1986 Nobel Prize in Physics. Auguste Piccard became the first person to enter the Stratosphere with his pressurised hydrogen ballon, while his son Jacques Piccard became one of the first people to explore the deepest known part of the world's ocean (along with American Don Walsh).

The Swiss Space Office has been involved in various space technologies and programmes. It was one of the 10 founders of the European Space Agency in 1975 and is the seventh largest contributor to the ESA budget. In the private sector, several companies participate in the space industry, such as Oerlikon Space and Maxon Motors.

=== Energy ===
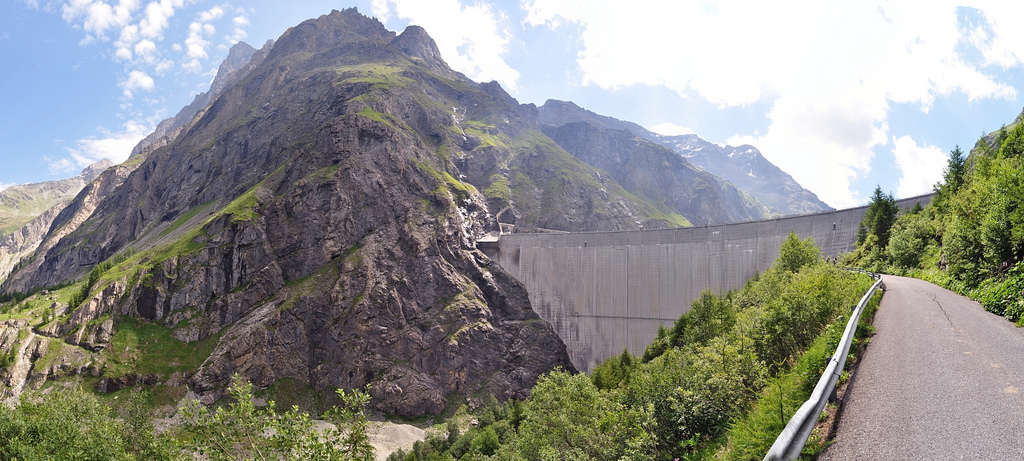
Switzerland has the tallest dams in Europe, among which the Mauvoisin Dam, in the Alps. Hydroelectric power is the most important domestic source of energy in the country.

Electricity generated in Switzerland is 56% from hydroelectricity and 39% from nuclear power, producing negligible CO_{2}. On 18 May 2003, two anti-nuclear referendums were defeated: Moratorium Plus, aimed at forbidding the building of new nuclear power plants (41.6% supported), and Electricity Without Nuclear (33.7% supported) after a moratorium expired in 2000. After the Fukushima nuclear disaster, in 2011 the government announced plans to end the use of nuclear energy in the following 20 to 30 years. In November 2016, Swiss voters rejected a Green Party referendum to accelerate the phaseout of nuclear power (45.8% supported). The Swiss Federal Office of Energy (SFOE) is responsible for energy supply and energy use within the Federal Department of Environment, Transport, Energy and Communications (DETEC). The agency supports the 2000-watt society initiative to cut the nation's energy use by more than half by 2050.

=== Transport ===
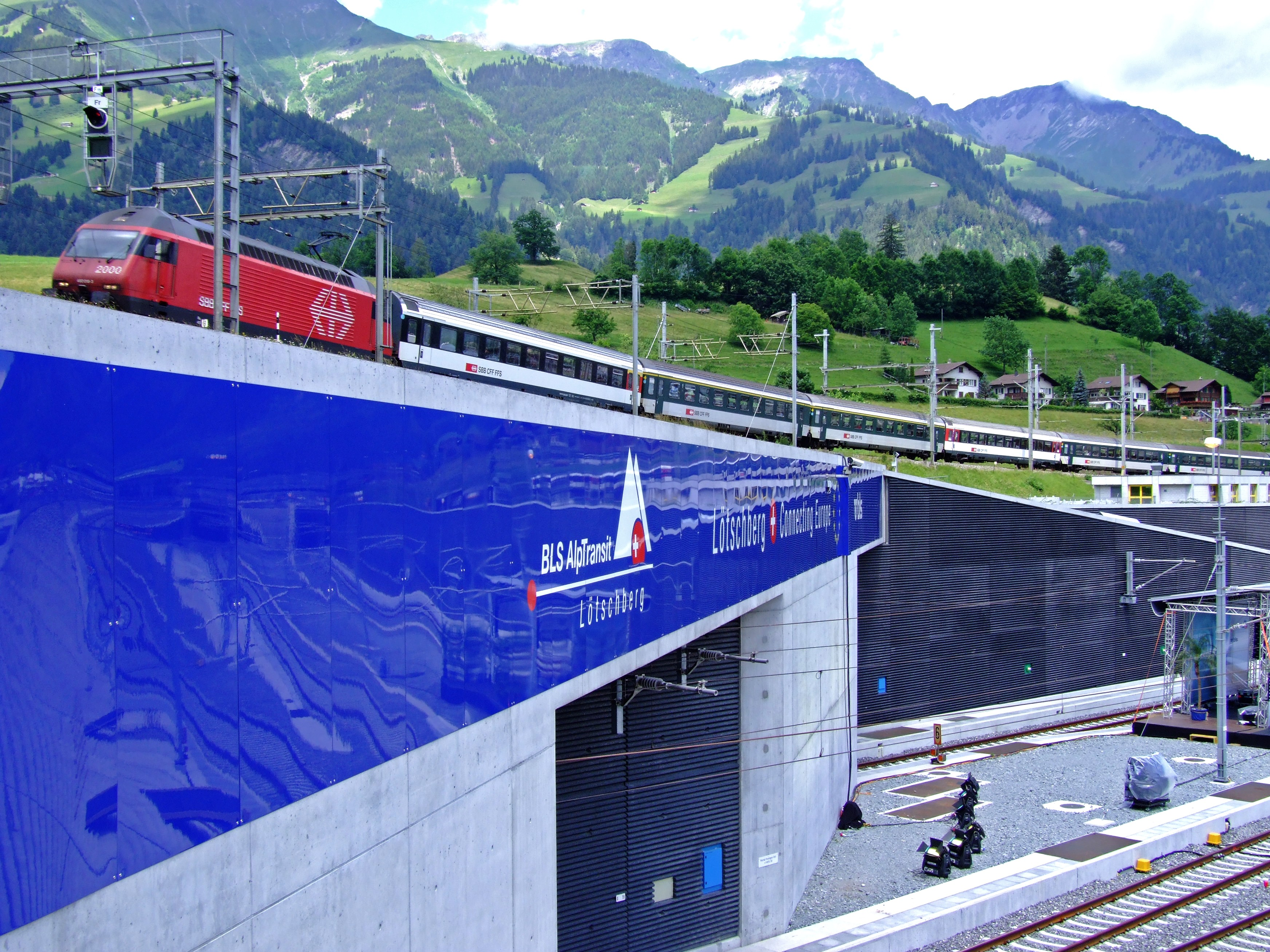
Entrance of the new Lötschberg Base Tunnel, the third-longest railway tunnel in the world, under the old Lötschberg railway line. It was the first completed tunnel of the greater project NRLA.

Switzerland had approximately 6,562,600 motor vehicles (excluding mopeds) in 2025. The largest category was passenger cars with 4,829,500 units (58.7% running on petrol, 24% on diesel, 5.2% on electricity and 11.9% hybrid).

The densest rail network in Europe spans 5,250 kilometres (3,260 mi) and carried 614 million passengers in 2023. In 2023, each Swiss resident travelled on average 2,446 kilometres (1,520 mi) by rail, more than any other European country. Virtually 100% of the network is electrified. 60% of the network is operated by the Swiss Federal Railways (SBB CFF FFS). Besides the second largest standard gauge railway company, BLS AG, two railways companies operate on narrow gauge networks: the Rhaetian Railway (RhB) in Graubünden, which includes some World Heritage lines, and the Matterhorn Gotthard Bahn (MGB), which co-operates with RhB the Glacier Express between Zermatt and St. Moritz/Davos. Switzerland operates the world's longest and deepest railway tunnel and the first flat, low-level route through the Alps, the 57.1-kilometre-long (35.5 mi) Gotthard Base Tunnel, the largest part of the New Railway Link through the Alps (NRLA) project.

Public transport is very popular. For example, a 2010 microcensus discovered that in Zurich, Switzerland's largest city, 32% of its inhabitants use the city's public transport regularly (trams or trolleybuses, of which 60% used at least those two modes), while 26% depended on a personal vehicle. Fewer than half the residents owned a car or a motorcycle.

Switzerland has a publicly managed, toll-free road network financed by highway permits as well as vehicle and petrol taxes. The Swiss autobahn/autoroute system requires the annual purchase of a vignette (toll sticker)—for 40 Swiss francs—to use its roadways, including passenger cars and trucks. The Swiss autobahn/autoroute network stretches for 2,259 km (1,404 mi) and has one of the highest motorway densities in the world.

Zurich Airport is Switzerland's largest international flight gateway; it handled 31.2 million passengers in 2024. The other international airports are Geneva Airport (13.9 million passengers in 2012), EuroAirport Basel Mulhouse Freiburg (located in France), Bern Airport, Lugano Airport, St. Gallen-Altenrhein Airport and Sion Airport. Swiss International Air Lines is the flag carrier. Its main hub is Zurich, but it is legally domiciled in Basel.

In November 2025, Switzerland's Federal Roads Office (FEDRO) granted WeRide, a global leader in autonomous driving technology, a driverless permit which authorises it to operate autonomously on public roads in the Furttal region. This is the first driverless Robotaxi permit for passengers issued in Switzerland.

=== Environment ===
Switzerland has one of the best environmental records among developed nations. It is a signatory to the Kyoto Protocol; alongside Mexico and South Korea, it was a founding member of the Environmental Integrity Group (EIG).

The country is active in recycling and anti-littering programs and is one of the world's top recyclers, recovering 66% to 96% of recyclable materials, varying across the country. The 2014 Global Green Economy Index placed Switzerland among the top 10 green economies.

Switzerland has an economic system for garbage disposal, which is based mostly on recycling and energy-producing incinerators. As in other European countries, the illegal disposal of garbage is heavily fined. In almost all Swiss municipalities, mandatory stickers or dedicated garbage bags allow the identification of disposable garbage.

== Demographics ==
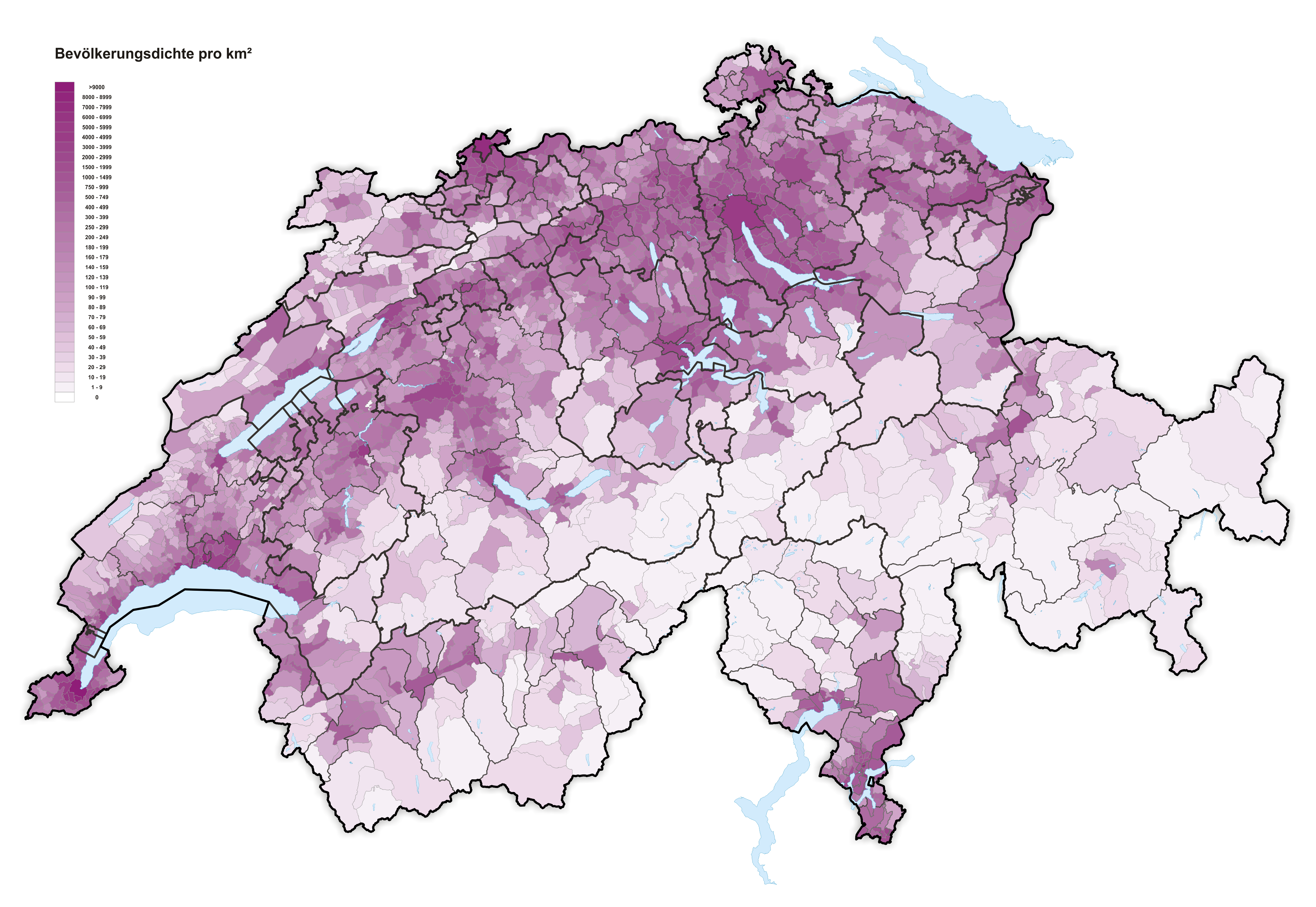
Population density in Switzerland (2019)

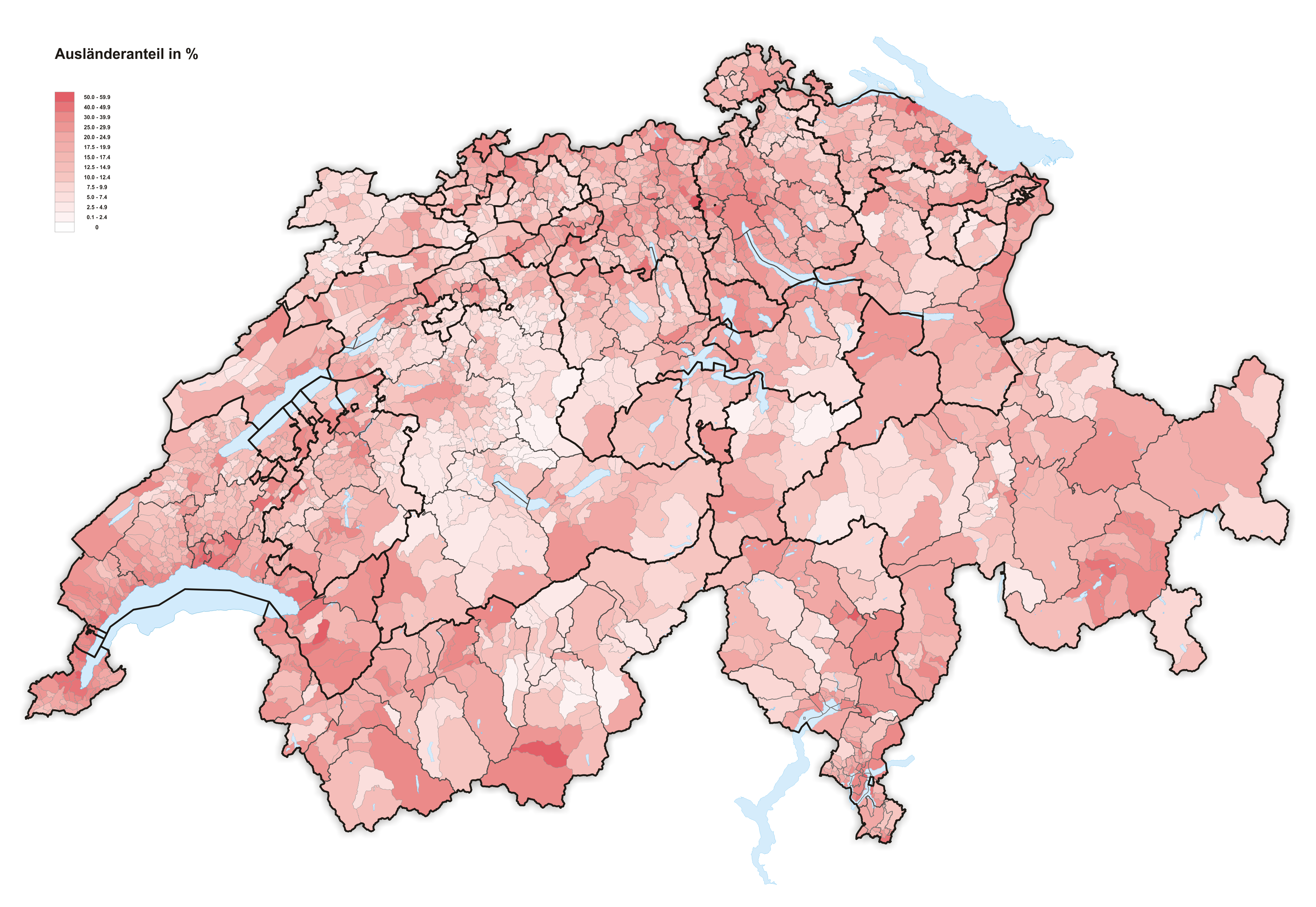
Percentage of foreigners in Switzerland (2019)

Permanent resident population aged 15 or over, by migration status, 2012/2024
Migration status	Year	pct.	Change
Without migration background	2024	58%	-7%
Without migration background	2012	65%	-7%
Immigrants: First Generation	2024	33%	+5%
Immigrants: First Generation	2012	28%	+5%
Immigrants: Second Generation	2024	8%	+1%
Immigrants: Second Generation	2012	7%	+1%
Migration status unknown	2024	1%	+1%
Migration status unknown	2012	0%	+1%

The Swiss population is about 9 million as of June 2024. Like other developed countries, Switzerland experienced rapid population growth during the industrial era, with the number of inhabitants quadrupling between 1800 and 1990. Population growth is projected to continue to 2035, due mostly to immigration. Like most of Europe, Switzerland faces an ageing population, with a fertility rate close to replacement level. Switzerland has one of the world's oldest populations, with an average age of 44.5 years.

According to the World Factbook, as of 2020, the largest ethnic group in the country is Swiss (69.2%), which includes several ethno-linguistic groups, followed by German (4.2%), Italian (3.2%), Portuguese (2.5%), French (2.1%), Kosovan (1.1%), Turkish (1%), and other (16.7%). The Council of Europe suggests a population of around 30,000 Romani people.

=== Largest cities ===
Largest towns in Switzerland Swiss Federal Statistical Office (FSO), Neuchâtel, 2020
Rank	Name	Canton	Pop.	Rank	Name	Canton	Pop.
1	Zurich	Zurich	421,878	11	Thun	Bern	43,476
2	Geneva	Geneva	203,856	12	Bellinzona	Ticino	43,360
3	Basel	Basel-Stadt	178,120	13	Köniz	Bern	42,388
4	Lausanne	Vaud	140,202	14	La Chaux-de-Fonds	Neuchâtel	36,915
5	Bern	Bern	134,794	15	Fribourg	Fribourg	38,039
6	Winterthur	Zurich	114,220	16	Schaffhausen	Schaffhausen	36,952
7	Lucerne	Luzern	82,620	17	Vernier	Geneva	34,898
8	St. Gallen	St. Gallen	76,213	18	Chur	Graubünden	36,336
9	Lugano	Ticino	62,315	19	Sion	Valais	34,978
10	Biel/Bienne	Bern	55,206	20	Uster	Zurich	35,337

=== Immigration ===
In 2023, resident foreigners made up 26.3% of Switzerland's population. Most of these (83%) were from European countries. Italy provided the largest single group of foreigners, accounting for 14.7% of total foreign population, followed closely by Germany (14.0%), Portugal (11.7%), France (6.6%), Kosovo (5.1%), Spain (3.9%), Turkey (3.1%), North Macedonia (3.1%), Serbia (2.8%), Austria (2.0%), United Kingdom (1.9%), Bosnia and Herzegovina (1.3%) and Croatia (1.3%). Immigrants from Sri Lanka (1.3%), most of them former Tamil refugees, were the largest group of Asian origin (7.9%).

2021 figures show that 39.5% (compared to 34.7% in 2012) of the permanent resident population aged 15 or over (around 2.89 million), had an immigrant background. 38% of the population with an immigrant background (1.1 million) held Swiss citizenship.

In the 2000s, domestic and international institutions expressed concern about what was perceived as an increase in xenophobia. In reply to one critical report, the Federal Council noted that "racism unfortunately is present in Switzerland", but stated that the high proportion of foreign citizens in the country, as well as the generally successful integration of foreigners, underlined Switzerland's openness. A follow-up study conducted in 2018 reported that 59% considered racism a serious problem in Switzerland. The proportion of the population that claimed to have been targeted by racial discrimination increased from 10% in 2014 to almost 17% in 2018, according to the Federal Statistical Office.

=== Languages ===
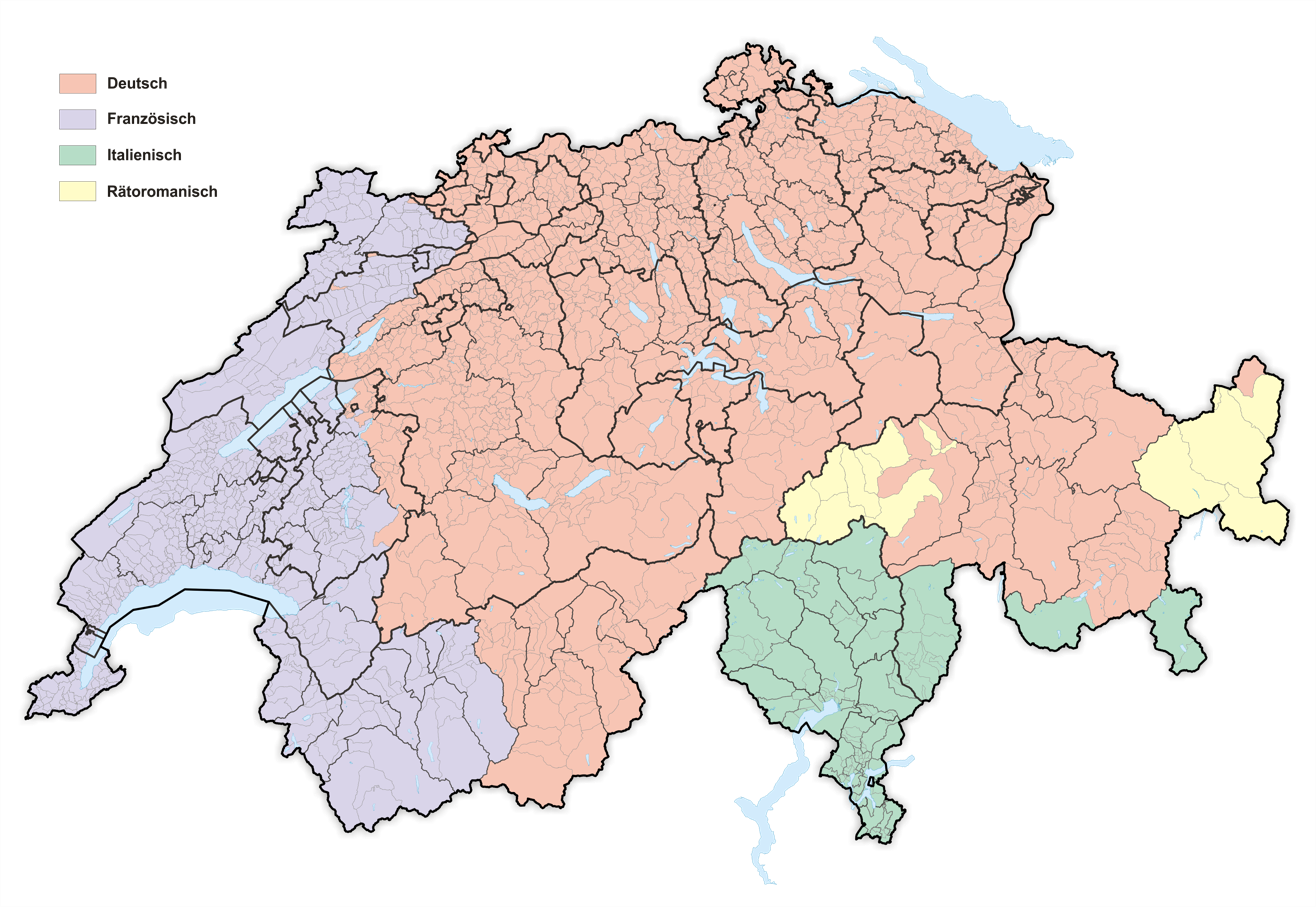
National languages in Switzerland (2026): German (62%) French (22.7%) Italian (8.2%) Romansh (0.5%)

Switzerland has four national languages: mainly German (spoken natively by 62% of the population in 2026); French (22.7%) spoken natively in the west; and Italian (8.2%) spoken natively in the south. The fourth national language, Romansh (0.5%), is a Romance language spoken locally in the southeastern trilingual canton of Grisons, and is designated by Article 4 of the Federal Constitution as a national language along with German, French, and Italian. In Article 70 it is mentioned as an official language if the authorities communicate with persons who speak Romansh. However, federal laws and other official acts do not need to be decreed in Romansh.

In 2016, the languages most spoken at home among permanent residents aged 15 and older were Swiss German (59.4%), French (23.5%), Standard German (10.6%), and Italian (8.5%). Other languages spoken at home included English (5.0%), Portuguese (3.8%), Albanian (3.0%), Spanish (2.6%) and Serbian and Croatian (2.5%). 6.9% reported speaking another language at home. In 2019 more than two-thirds (68%) of the permanent resident population indicated speaking more than one language regularly.

The federal government is obliged to communicate in the official languages, and in the federal parliament simultaneous translation is provided from and into German, French and Italian.

Aside from the official forms of their respective languages, the four linguistic regions of Switzerland also have local dialectal forms. The role played by dialects in each linguistic region varies dramatically: in German-speaking regions, Swiss German dialects have become more prevalent since the second half of the 20th century, especially in the media, and are used as an everyday language for many, while the Swiss variety of Standard German is almost always used instead of dialect for written communication (cf. diglossic usage of a language). Conversely, in the French-speaking regions, local Franco-Provençal dialects have almost disappeared (only 6.3% of the population of Valais, 3.9% of Fribourg, and 3.1% of Jura still spoke dialects at the end of the 20th century), while in the Italian-speaking regions, the use of Lombard dialects is mostly limited to family settings and casual conversation.

The principal official languages have terms not used outside of Switzerland, known as Helvetisms. German Helvetisms are, roughly speaking, a large group of words typical of Swiss Standard German that do not appear in Standard German, nor in other German dialects. These include terms from Switzerland's surrounding language cultures (German Billett from French), from similar terms in another language (Italian azione used not only as act but also as discount from German Aktion). Swiss French, while generally close to the French of France, also contains some Helvetisms. The most frequent characteristics of Helvetisms are in vocabulary, phrases, and pronunciation, although certain Helvetisms denote themselves as special in syntax and orthography. Duden, the comprehensive German dictionary, contains about 3000 Helvetisms. Current French dictionaries, such as the Petit Larousse, include several hundred Helvetisms; notably, Swiss French uses different terms than that of France for the numbers 70 (septante) and 90 (nonante) and often 80 (huitante) as well.

Learning one of the other national languages is compulsory for all Swiss pupils, hence many Swiss are supposed to be at least bilingual, especially those belonging to linguistic minority groups. Because the largest part of Switzerland is German-speaking, many French, Italian, and Romansh speakers migrating to the rest of Switzerland and the children of those non-German-speaking Swiss born within the rest of Switzerland speak German. While learning one of the other national languages at school is important, most Swiss learn English to communicate with Swiss speakers of other languages, as it is perceived as a neutral means of communication. English often functions as the de facto lingua franca.

=== Religion ===
Religion in Switzerland (age 15+, 2021–2023): (Note: Since 2010, statistics of religious affiliation in Switzerland provided by the Swiss Federal Statistical Office are based on a national structural survey of 200,000 people aged 15 years and older (corresponding to 2.5% of the total resident population). Data are extrapolated to obtain statistical results for the whole population (aged 15 years and older). These results are estimates subject to some degree of uncertainty indicated by a confidence interval, but by merging samples (pooling) from several years it is possible to get more accurate results, including total number of Protestants and information about minority religions. Note: The figures of the structural survey are not entirely comparable to data collection before 2010 based on census figures (counting every person living in Switzerland) or to annual official numbers of church members.)
1. Catholicism (31.9%)
2. Swiss Protestantism (20.4%)
3. Unaffiliated (33.8%)
4. Islam (5.80%)
5. Other religions (7.20%)
6. Undetermined (0.90%)

Christianity is the predominant religion according to national surveys of Swiss Federal Statistical Office, divided between the Catholic Church (31.9% of the population), the Swiss Reformed Church (20.4%) and other Christian denominations.

Switzerland has no official state religion, though most cantons (except Geneva and Neuchâtel) recognise official churches, either the Catholic Church or the Swiss Reformed Church. These churches, and in some cantons the Old Catholic Church and Jewish congregations, are financed by official taxation of members. In 2020, the Roman Catholic Church had 3,048,475 registered and church tax paying members (corresponding to 35.2% of the total population), while the Swiss Reformed Church had 2,015,816 members (23.3% of the total population). (Note: Precise statistics about the membership of churches among the total population in Switzerland is only available for officially registered and church tax paying members of the Catholic Church in Switzerland and the Protestant Church of Switzerland (Landeskirchen).)

As of 2023, according to a national survey conducted by the Swiss Federal Statistical Office, the next largest Christian groups are Eastern and Oriental Orthodoxy (2.8%), Reformed Evangelicalism (1.1%), Neo-Pietism (0.4%), Pentecostalism and other Charismatic communities (0.4%, mostly incorporated in the Schweizer Pfingstmission), Adventism (0.4%), Apostolic communities (0.2%), the Old Catholic Church (0.1%), and other Christian denominations (0.3%).

Non-Christian religions are Islam (5.8%), Hinduism (0.6%), Buddhism (0.5%), Judaism (0.2%) and others (0.2%).

Close to one-third (33.8%) of the population are not affiliated with a religious community. Some traditionally Protestant cantons and cities have a slight Catholic majority, reflecting a growing trend in seculairsation and irreligion since 1970; as 2012, the proportion of religiously unaffiliated people was largest in Basel-City (42%), canton of Neuchâtel (38%), canton of Geneva (35%), canton of Vaud (26%), or Zurich city (city: >25%; canton: 23%).

By 2024, half the Swiss population never attended a religious event in the 12 months preceding, according to the Federal Statistical Office. More than a quarter who left their religion cite loss of faith or disagreement with their religious community.

=== Education ===
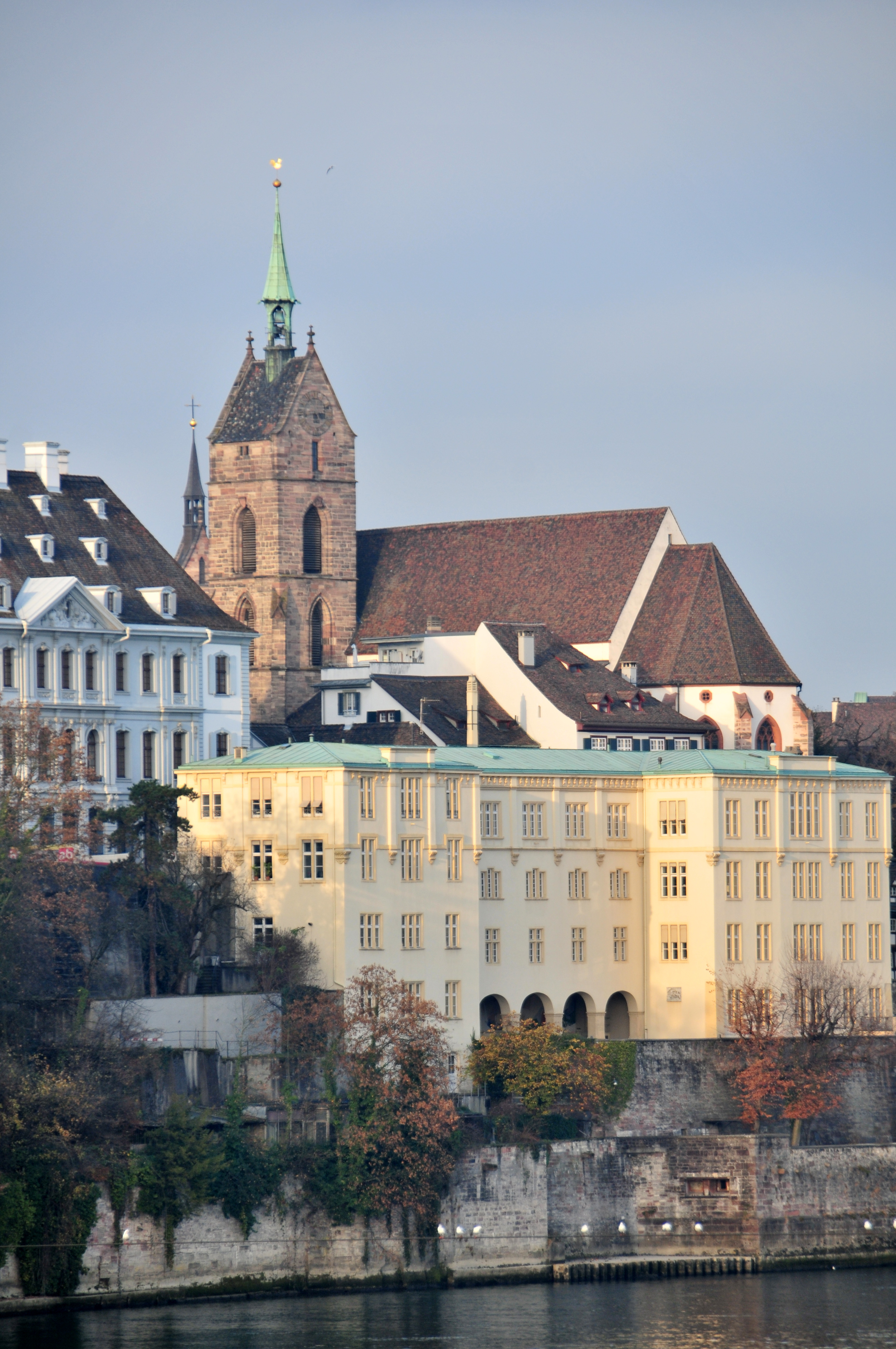
The University of Basel is Switzerland's oldest university (1460).

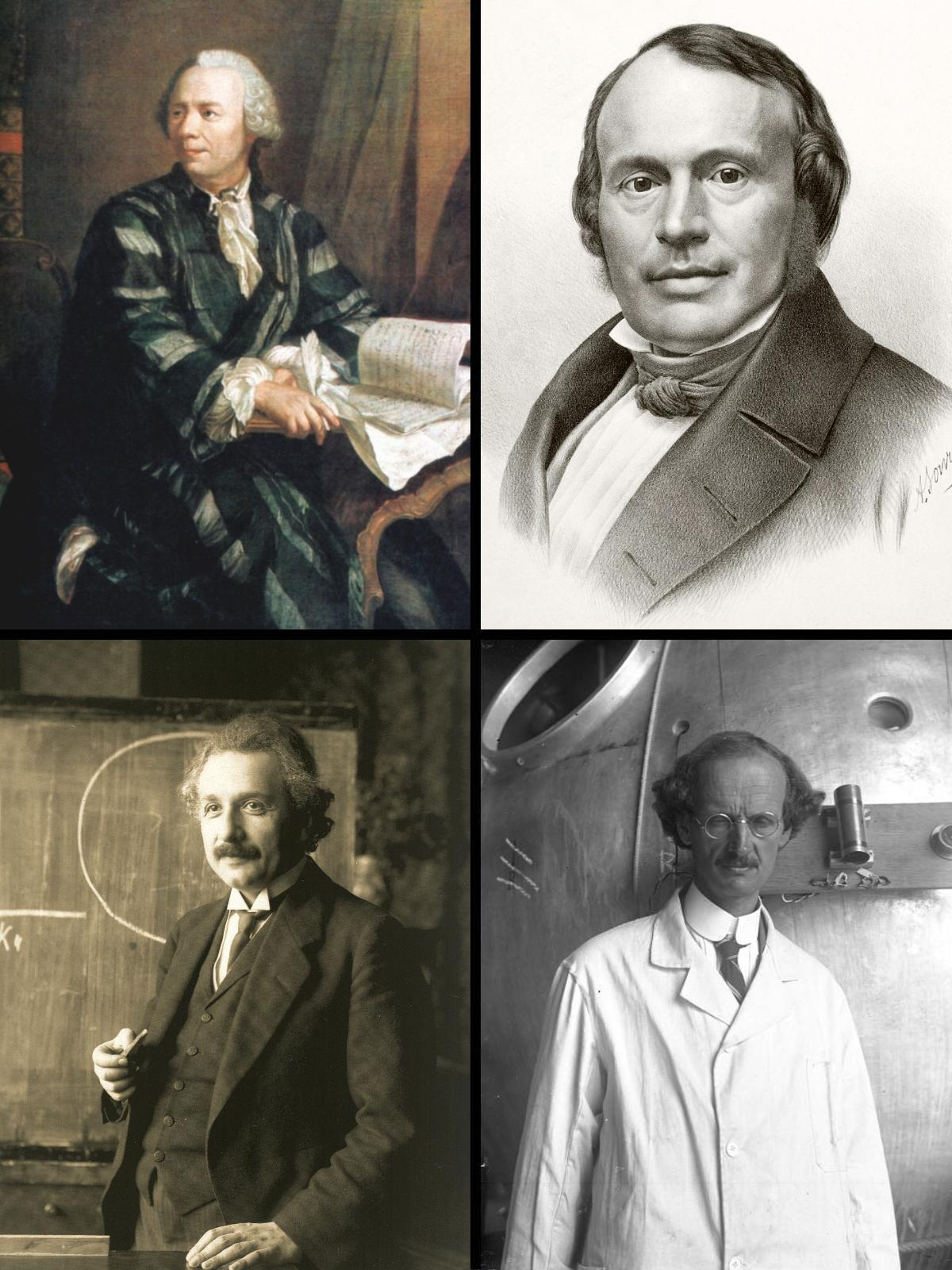
Some Swiss scientists who played a key role in their discipline (clockwise): Leonhard Euler (mathematics) Louis Agassiz (glaciology) Auguste Piccard (aeronautics) Albert Einstein (physics)

Education in Switzerland is diverse, because the constitution of Switzerland delegates the operation for the school system to the cantons. Public and private schools are available, including many private international schools.

==== Primary education ====
The minimum age for primary school is about six years, but most cantons provide a free "children's school" starting at age four or five. Primary school continues until grade four, five or six, depending on the school. Traditionally, the first foreign language in school was one of the other Swiss languages, although in 2000, English was elevated in a few cantons. At the end of primary school or at the beginning of secondary school, pupils are assigned according to their capacities into one of several sections (often three). The fastest learners are taught advanced classes to prepare for further studies and the matura, while other students receive an education adapted to their needs.

==== Tertiary education ====
Switzerland hosts 12 universities, ten of which are maintained at cantonal level and usually offer non-technical subjects. It ranked 87th on the 2019 Academic Ranking of World Universities. The largest is the University of Zurich with nearly 25,000 students. The Swiss Federal Institute of Technology Zurich (ETHZ) and the University of Zurich are listed 20th and 54th respectively, on the 2015 Academic Ranking of World Universities.

The federal government sponsors two institutes: the Swiss Federal Institute of Technology Zurich (ETHZ) in Zurich, founded in 1855 and the École Polytechnique Fédérale de Lausanne (EPFL) in Lausanne, founded in 1969, formerly associated with the University of Lausanne. (Note: In 2008, the ETH Zurich was ranked 15th in the field Natural Sciences and Mathematics by the Shanghai Academic Ranking of World Universities and the EPFL in Lausanne was ranked 18th in the field Engineering/Technology and Computer Sciences by the same ranking.)

Eight of the world's ten best hotel schools are located in Switzerland. In addition, various universities of applied sciences are available. In business and management studies, the University of St. Gallen, (HSG) is ranked 436th in the world according to QS World University Rankings and the International Institute for Management Development (IMD), was ranked first in open programmes worldwide. Switzerland has the second highest rate (almost 18% in 2003) of foreign students in tertiary education, after Australia (slightly over 18%).

The Graduate Institute of International and Development Studies, located in Geneva, is continental Europe's oldest graduate school of international and development studies. It is widely held to be one of its most prestigious.

=== Health ===
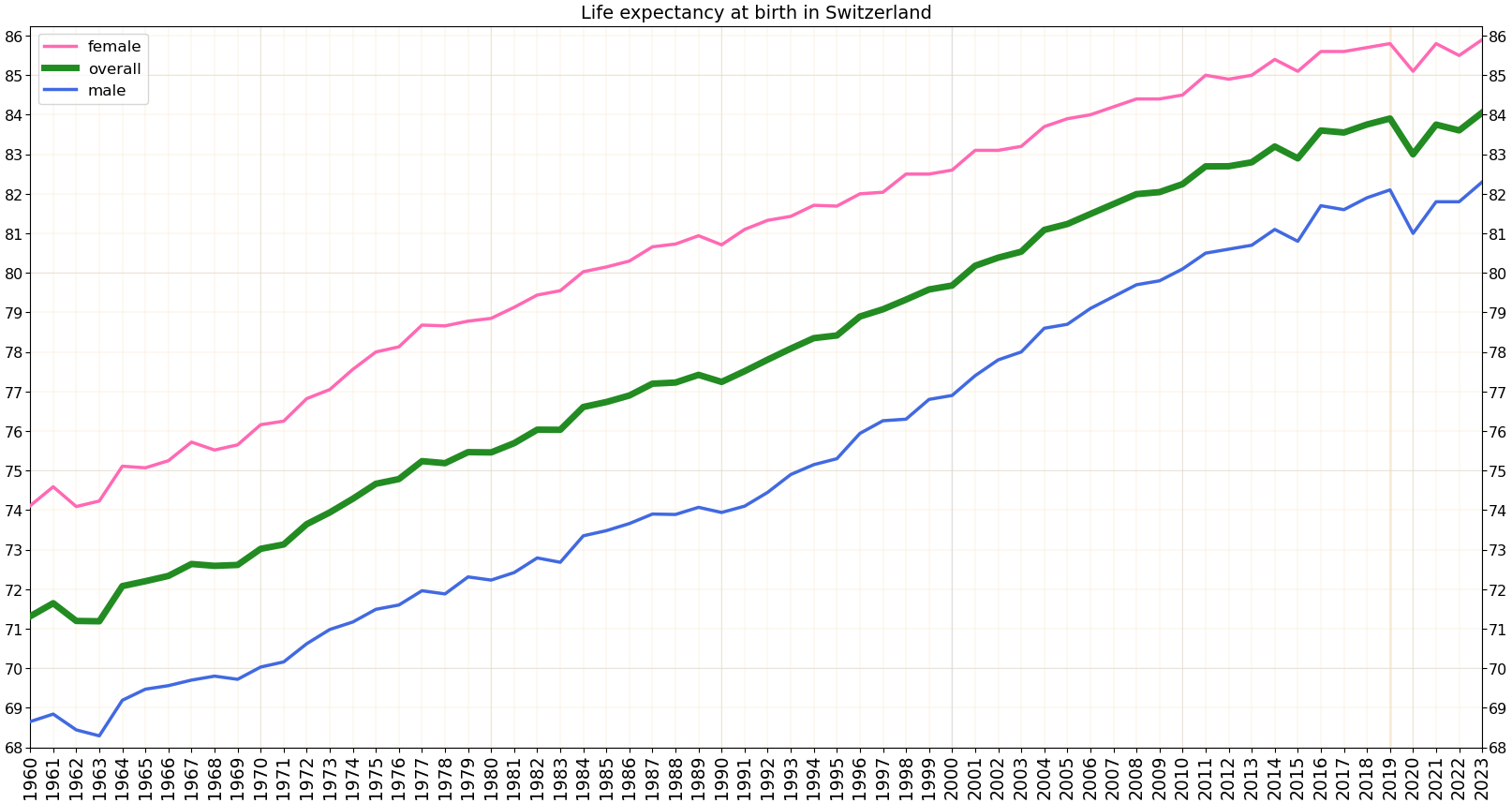
Life expectancy at birth in Switzerland

In the 2023 OECD "Health at a Glance" report, Switzerland's health statistics indicate several advantages relative to the OECD averages. The country records a life expectancy of 83.9 years, which is 3.6 years higher than the OECD average. Its preventable mortality rate is 94 per 100,000 people, which is below the OECD average of 158 per 100,000. The treatable mortality rate in Switzerland, at 39 per 100,000, is also below the OECD average of 79 per 100,000. Additionally, 3.9% of the Swiss population reports their health as bad or very bad, less than the OECD average of 7.9%. The prevalence of diabetes in Switzerland is lower than the OECD average. Switzerland performs better than the OECD benchmarks on 95% of the health indicators analysed. Other Issues relating to health include high drugs consumption, smoking and mental illness.

A new measure of expected human capital calculated for 195 countries from 1990 to 2016 and defined for each birth cohort as the expected years lived from age 20 to 64 years and adjusted for educational attainment, learning or education quality, and functional health status was published by The Lancet in September 2018. Switzerland had the twelfth highest level of expected human capital with 25 health, education, and learning-adjusted expected years lived between age 20 and 64 years. According to a study conducted by Swiss insurance company CSS in 2023, about one third of the Swiss "feel unhealthy or ill".

== Culture ==
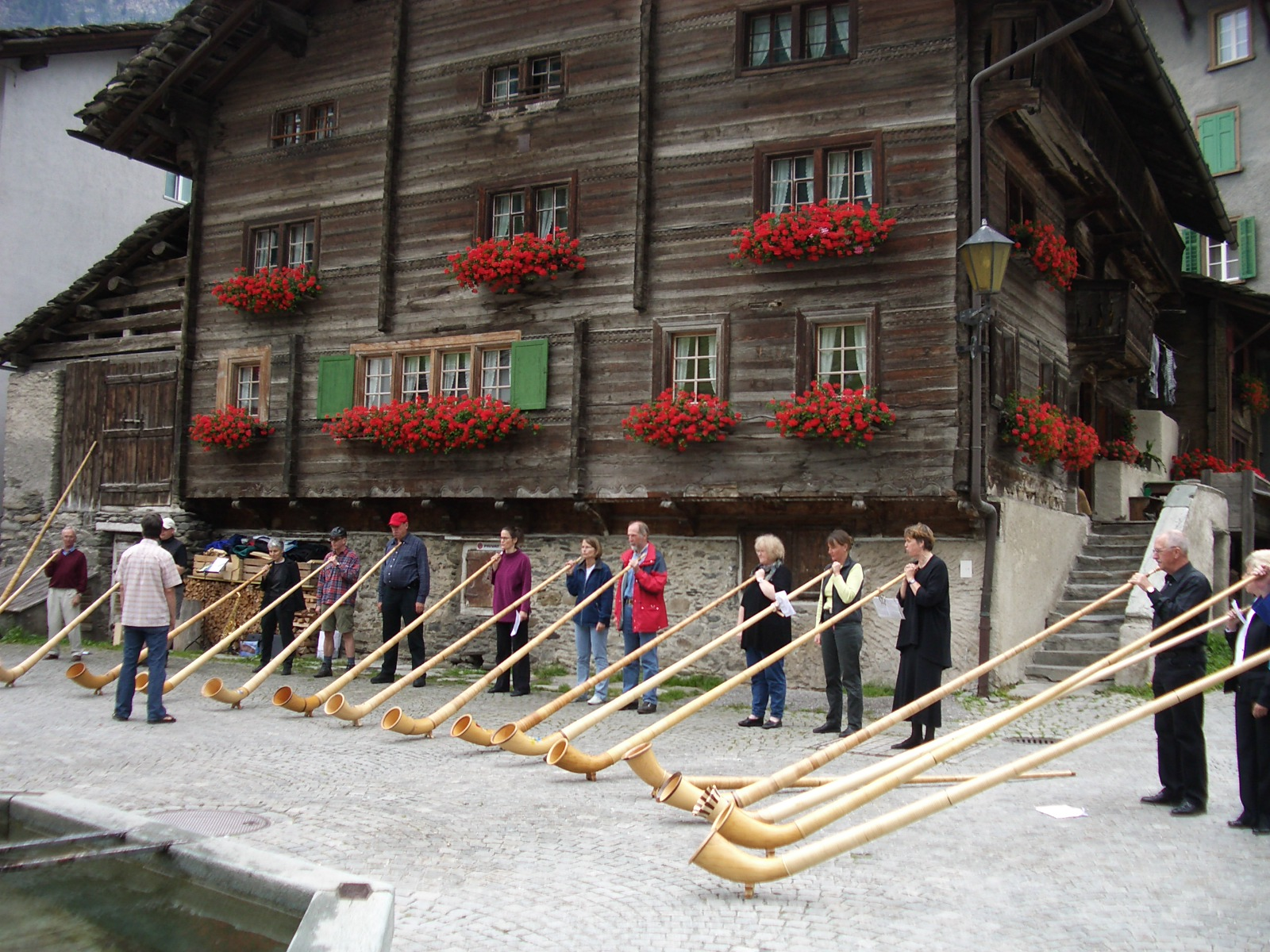
Alphorn concert in Vals

Swiss culture is characterised by diversity, which is reflected in diverse traditional customs. A region may be in some ways culturally connected to the neighbouring country that shares its language, all rooted in western European culture. The linguistically isolated Romansh culture in Graubünden in eastern Switzerland constitutes an exception. It survives only in the upper valleys of the Rhine and the Inn and strives to maintain its rare linguistic tradition.

Switzerland is home to notable contributors to art, architecture, literature, music and sciences. In addition, the country attracted creatives during times of unrest or war. Some 1000 museums are found in the country.

Among the most important cultural performances held annually are the Paléo Festival, Lucerne Festival, the Montreux Jazz Festival, the Locarno International Film Festival and Art Basel. In addition, Switzerland has hosted the Eurovision Song Contest thrice, in 1956 (the inaugural edition, held in Lugano), 1989 (Lausanne), and 2025 (Basel), and won three times, through Lys Assia in 1956, Celine Dion in 1988, and Nemo in 2024.

Alpine symbolism played an essential role in shaping Swiss history and the Swiss national identity. Many alpine areas and ski resorts attract visitors for winter sports as well as hiking and mountain biking in summer. The quieter seasons are spring and autumn. A traditional pastoral culture predominates in many areas, and small farms are omnipresent in rural areas. Folk art is nurtured in organisations across the country. Switzerland most directly in appears in music, dance, poetry, wood carving, and embroidery. The alphorn, a trumpet-like musical instrument made of wood has joined yodelling and the accordion as epitomes of traditional Swiss music.

=== Literature ===
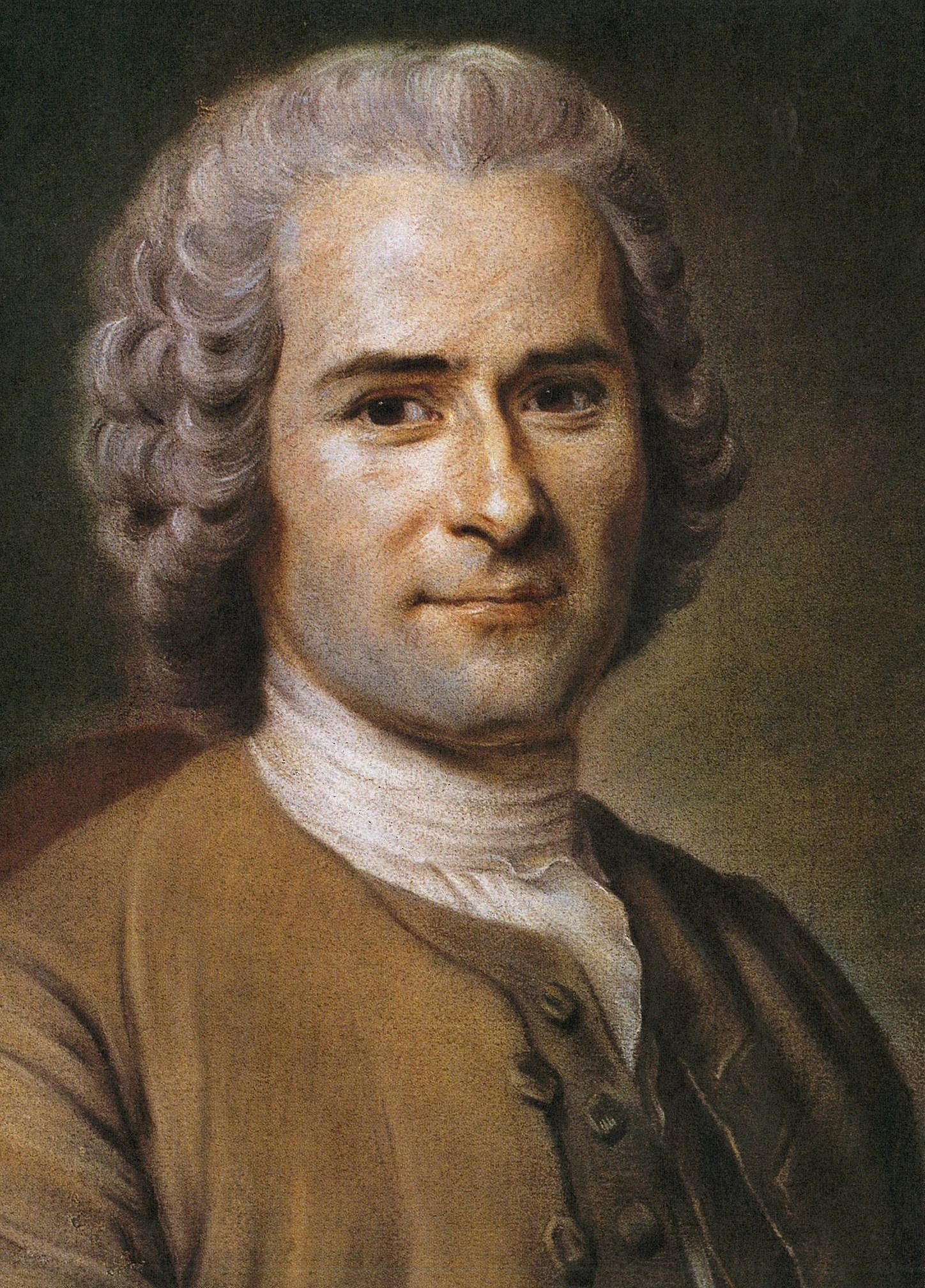
Jean-Jacques Rousseau was not only a writer but also an influential philosopher of the eighteenth century.

The earliest forms of literature were in German, reflecting the language's early predominance. In the 18th century, French became fashionable in Bern and elsewhere, while the influence of the French-speaking allies and subject lands increased.

Among the classic authors of Swiss literature are Jeremias Gotthelf (1797–1854) and Gottfried Keller (1819–1890); later writers are Max Frisch (1911–1991) and Friedrich Dürrenmatt (1921–1990), whose Das Versprechen (The Pledge) was released as a Hollywood film in 2001, starring Jack Nicholson.

Famous French-speaking writers were Jean-Jacques Rousseau (1712–1778) and Germaine de Staël (1766–1817). More recent authors include Charles Ferdinand Ramuz (1878–1947), whose novels describe the lives of peasants and mountain dwellers, set in a harsh environment, and Blaise Cendrars (born Frédéric Sauser, 1887–1961). Italian and Romansh-speaking authors also contributed to the Swiss literary landscape, generally in proportion to their number.

Probably the most famous Swiss literary creation, Heidi, the story of an orphan girl who lives with her grandfather in the Alps, is one of the most popular children's books and has come to be a symbol of Switzerland. Her creator, Johanna Spyri (1827–1901), wrote a number of books on similar themes.

=== Media ===
Freedom of the press and the right to free expression is guaranteed in the constitution. The Swiss News Agency (SNA) broadcasts information in three of the four national languages—on politics, economics, society and culture. The SNA supplies almost all Swiss media and foreign media with its reporting.

In Switzerland, the most influential newspapers include the German-language Tages-Anzeiger and Neue Zürcher Zeitung, as well as the French-language Le Temps. Additionally, almost every city has at least one local newspaper published in the predominant local language.

The government exerts greater control over broadcast media than print media, especially due to financing and licensing. The Swiss Broadcasting Corporation, an EBU member, whose name was recently changed to SRG SSR, is charged with the production and distribution of radio and television content. SRG SSR studios are distributed across the various language regions. Radio content is produced in six central and four regional studios while video media are produced in Geneva, Zurich, Basel, and Lugano. An extensive cable network allows most Swiss to access content from neighbouring countries.

=== Cuisine ===
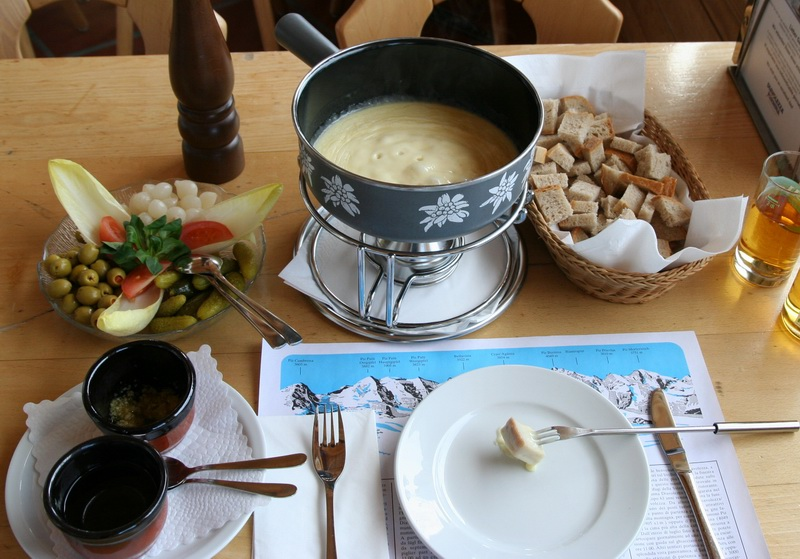
Fondue is melted cheese, into which bread is dipped.

The cuisine is multifaceted. While dishes such as fondue, raclette or rösti are omnipresent, each region developed its gastronomy according to the varieties of climate and language, for example, Zürcher Geschnetzeltes, engl.: sliced meat Zurich style. Traditional Swiss cuisine uses ingredients similar to those in other European countries, as well as unique dairy products and cheeses such as Gruyère or Emmental, produced in the valleys of Gruyères and Emmental. The number of fine-dining establishments is high, particularly in western Switzerland.

Chocolate has been made in Switzerland since the 18th century. Its reputation grew at the end of the 19th century with the invention of modern techniques such as conching and tempering, which enabled higher quality. Another breakthrough was the invention of solid milk chocolate in 1875 by Daniel Peter. The Swiss are the world's largest chocolate consumers.

The most popular alcoholic drink is wine. Switzerland is notable for its variety of grape varieties, reflecting the large variations in terroirs. Swiss wine is produced mainly in Valais, Vaud (Lavaux), Geneva and Ticino, with a small majority of white wines. Vineyards have been cultivated in Switzerland since the Roman era, even though traces of a more ancient origin can be found. The most widespread varieties are the Chasselas (called Fendant in Valais) and Pinot Noir. Merlot is the main variety produced in Ticino. Eighty-two percent of the population regularly drinks alcoholic beverages.

=== Sports ===
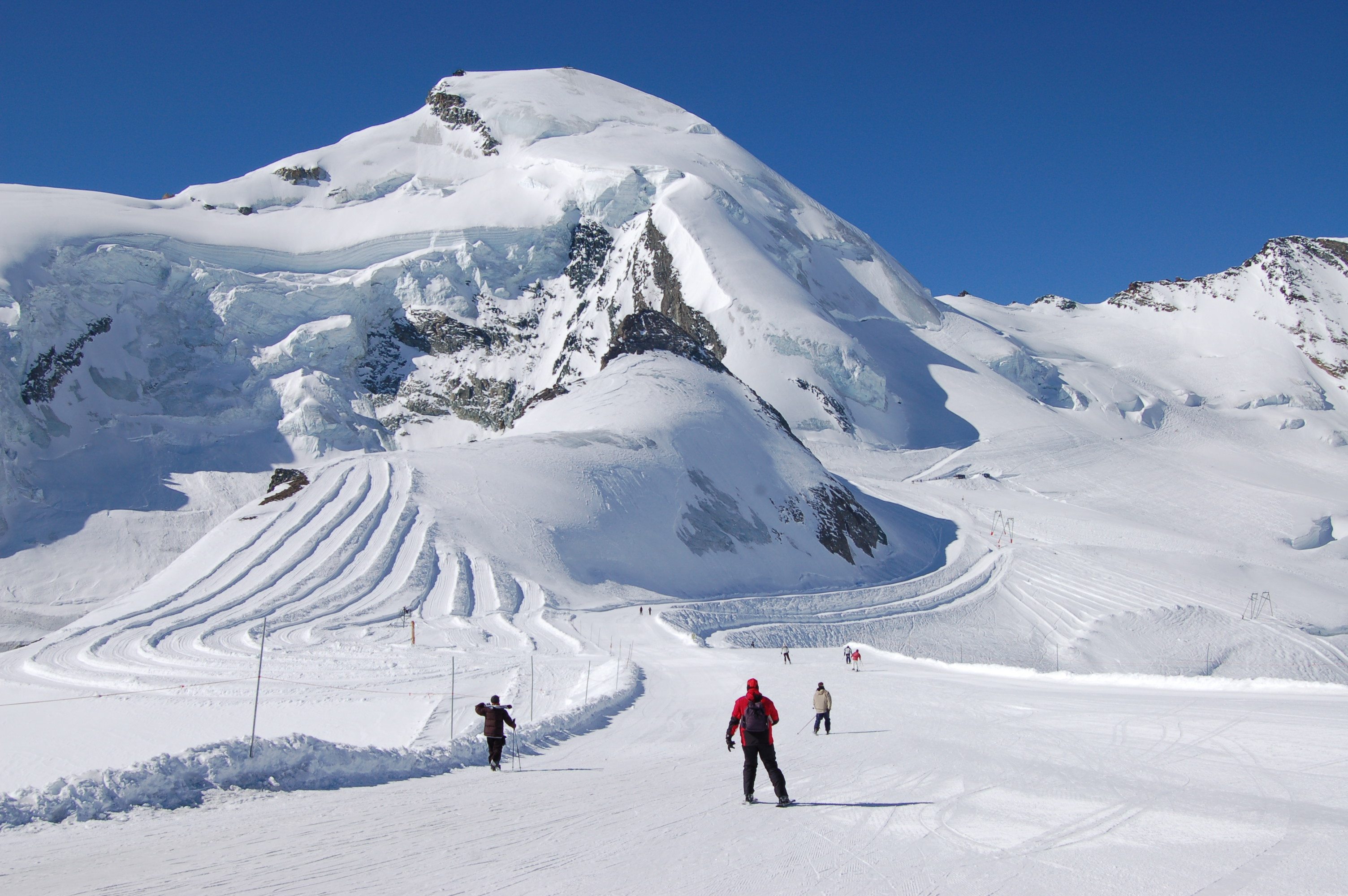
Ski area over the glaciers of Saas-Fee

Skiing, snowboarding and mountaineering are among the most popular sports, reflecting the nature of the country. Winter sports are practised by natives and visitors. The bobsleigh was invented in St. Moritz. The first world ski championships were held in Mürren (1931) and St. Moritz (1934). The latter town hosted the second Winter Olympic Games in 1928 and the fifth edition in 1948. Among its most successful skiers and world champions are Pirmin Zurbriggen and Didier Cuche.

The most prominently watched sports in Switzerland are football and ice hockey.

The headquarters of the international football's and ice hockey's governing bodies, the International Federation of Association Football (FIFA) and International Ice Hockey Federation (IIHF) are located in Zurich. Many other headquarters of international sports federations are located in Switzerland. For example, the International Olympic Committee (IOC), IOC's Olympic Museum and the Court of Arbitration for Sport (CAS) are located in Lausanne.

Switzerland hosted the 1954 FIFA World Cup and was the joint host, with Austria, of the UEFA Euro 2008 tournament. The Swiss Super League is the nation's professional football club league, with clubs including BSC Young Boys performing consistently in European club competitions. Europe's highest football pitch, at 2,000 metres (6,600 ft) above sea level, is located in Switzerland, the Ottmar Hitzfeld Stadium.

Many Swiss follow ice hockey and support one of the 14 teams of the National League, which is the most attended league in Europe. In 2009, Switzerland hosted the IIHF World Championship for the tenth time. It also became World Vice-Champion in 2013, 2018 and 2024. Its numerous lakes make Switzerland an attractive sailing destination. The largest, Lake Geneva, is the home of the sailing team Alinghi which was the first European team to win the America's Cup in 2003 and which successfully defended the title in 2007.

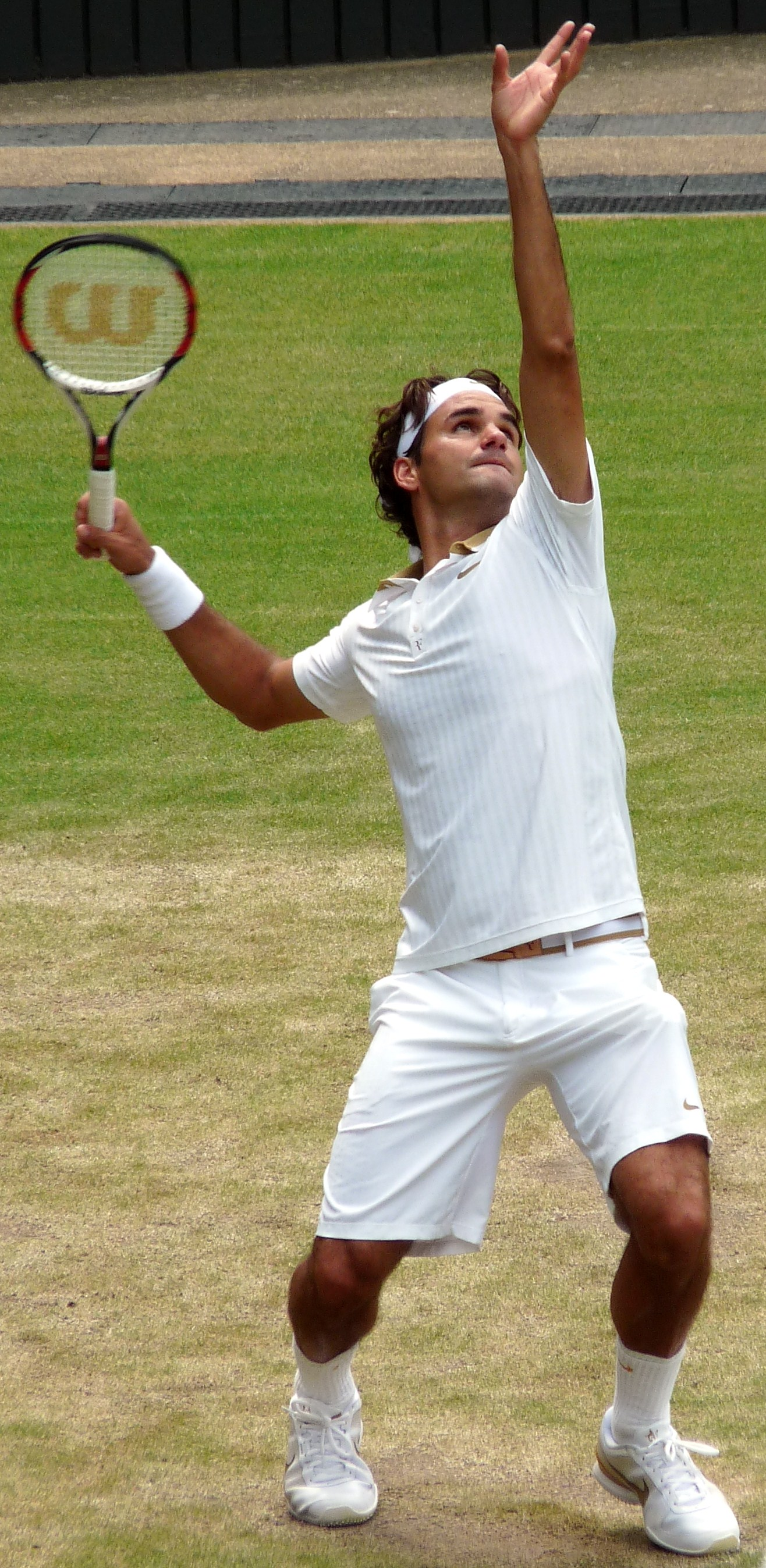
Roger Federer has won 20 Grand Slam singles titles, making him among the most successful men's tennis players ever.

Swiss tennis player Roger Federer is widely regarded as among the sport's greatest players. He won 20 Grand Slam tournaments overall including a record 8 Wimbledon titles. He won six ATP Finals. He was ranked no. 1 in the ATP rankings for a record 237 consecutive weeks. He ended 2004, 2005, 2006, 2007 and 2009 ranked no. 1. Fellow Swiss players Martina Hingis and Stan Wawrinka also won multiple Grand Slam titles. Switzerland won the Davis Cup title in 2014.

Motorsport racecourses and events were banned in Switzerland following the 1955 Le Mans disaster with exceptions for events such as hillclimbing. The country continued to produce successful racing drivers such as Clay Regazzoni, Sébastien Buemi, Jo Siffert, Dominique Aegerter, successful World Touring Car Championship driver Alain Menu, 2014 24 Hours of Le Mans winner Marcel Fässler and 2015 24 Hours Nürburgring winner Nico Müller. Switzerland also won the A1GP World Cup of Motorsport in 2007–08 with driver Neel Jani. Swiss motorcycle racer Thomas Lüthi won the 2005 MotoGP World Championship in the 125cc category. The ban was ultimately lifted in May 2022, on the grounds that safety in motorsport had vastly improved since the ban was first imposed. However, despite the ban being lifted in 2022, Motorsport will officially be legalised on June 1, 2026, meaning Motorsport will be legal for the first time in 71 years.

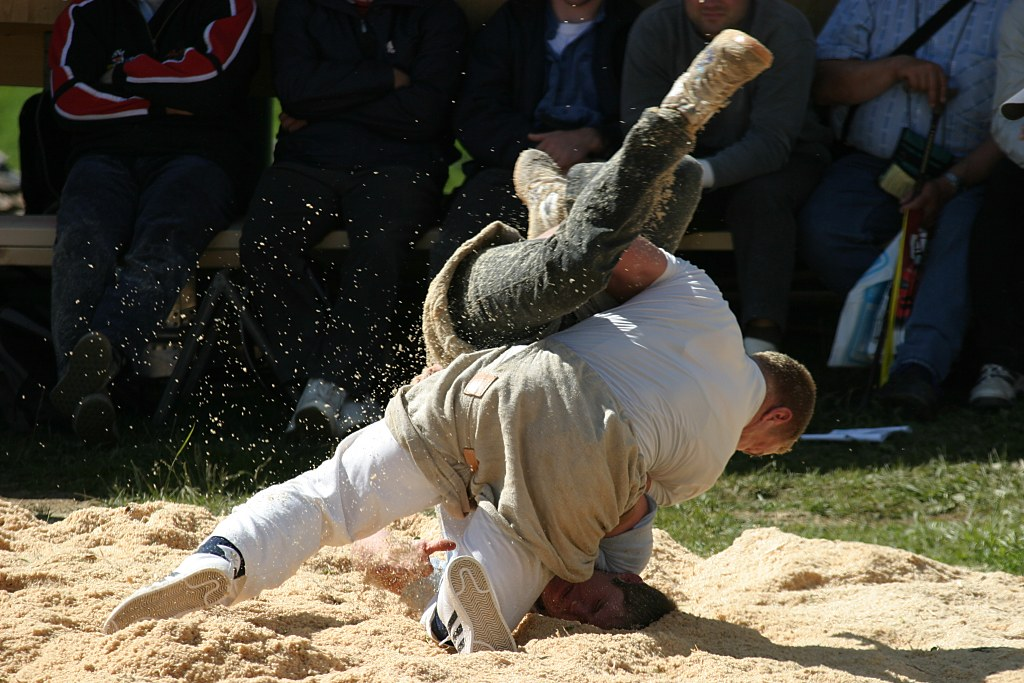
Traditional wrestling

Traditional sports include Swiss wrestling or Schwingen, a tradition from the rural central cantons and considered the national sport by some. Hornussen is another indigenous Swiss sport, which is like a cross between baseball and golf. Steinstossen is the Swiss variant of stone put, a competition in throwing a heavy stone. Practised only among the alpine population since prehistoric times, it is recorded to have taken place in Basel in the 13th century. It is central to the Unspunnenfest, first held in 1805, with its symbol the 83.5 stone named Unspunnenstein.

== See also ==
- Outline of Switzerland
