= Cannabis in Switzerland =

Legality of cannabis in Europe Legal for recreational use by adults Legal for medical use under certain conditions by adults Illegal

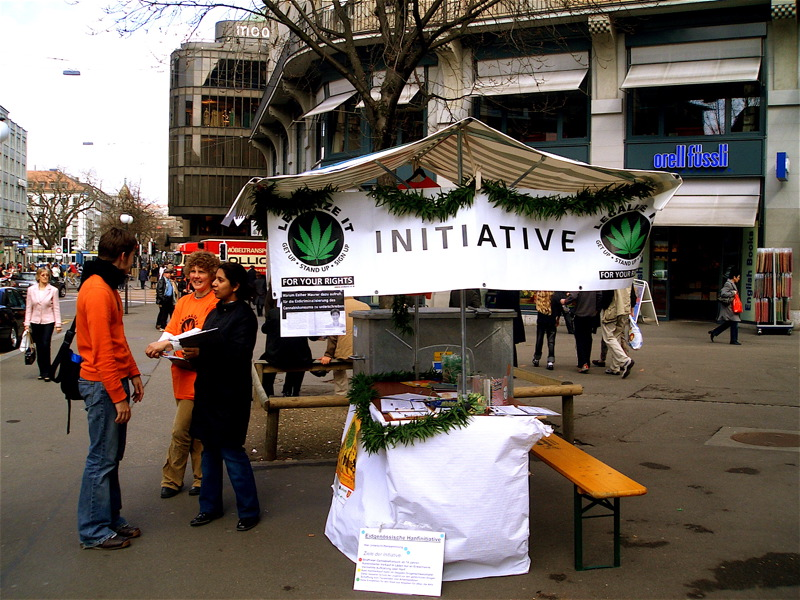
Legalisation booth in Zurich

Cannabis in Switzerland is illegal, though minor possession was decriminalised to a fine in 2012. Several cantons began to allow adults to cultivate and use cannabis in 2012, but this was struck down by the Federal Supreme Court. In 2016, four cities stated they were looking into establishing pilot cannabis clubs. The number of cannabis users in Switzerland is estimated to be around 500,000 among a population of 8 million (about 6.25 % of the population).

== Classification ==
Cannabis that contains more than 1.0% THC is classified as an illegal drug in Switzerland. Thus, according to the Federal Narcotics Act: the production, culture, use, and possession of cannabis are all prohibited and considered as criminal infringements. These infringements are punishable by up to three years of imprisonment and/or a fine.

Since 2017, legal cannabis, also known as "low-THC weed", with less than 1.0% of THC is sold at nearly every tobacco store. In March 2019, the Federal Administrative Court upheld the taxation scheme by customs officials, which impose a tax of CHF38 ($37.70) per kilo (2 lb) as well as 25% of the retail revenue. CBD cannabis is commonly used in Switzerland, but a number of complications are present due to its cultivation, as law enforcement first has to determine whether the cannabis variety tests below 1% THC. If this is the case, the police is obliged to return confiscated cannabis material. The THC level in legal CBD cannabis is high enough to render a drug test positive for THC, and therefore the driver will be prosecuted for driving under the influence of the drug.

== Medical use ==
Currently only one narcotic cannabis drug preparation is officially approved for medical use in Switzerland. However, with the adoption of a revision in the Federal Act on Narcotics and Psychotropic Substances (NarcA), accepted by popular vote in 2008, and in effect since 2011, Swiss physicians can obtain a special permit from the Federal Office of Public Health for their patients with the allowance to prescribe medical cannabis for 12 months. Only two pharmacies in the country are permitted to dispense cannabis tinctures and cannabis oil concentrates for patients with serious or terminal illnesses. Treatment options with cannabis flower or cannabis resin are not available.

An official cannabidiol preparation (Epidiolex) for rare forms of epilepsy was approved by the FDA in June 2018, and by the European Medicines Agency in September 2019. Since then, Swiss pharmacies are allowed to prepare and dispense medicinal products containing cannabidiol as a magistral formulation and prescription drug (not subject to the Narcotics Act), in accordance with current German Drug Codex DAC/NRF and Swiss pharmacopeial standards.

Since 1 August 2022, the use of medical cannabis in Switzerland has been regulated under new legislation. Previously, Swiss physicians required a special permit from the Federal Office of Public Health (FOPH) to prescribe cannabis-based treatments. With the amendment of the Narcotics Act (Betäubungsmittelgesetz, BetmG), this requirement has been lifted. Doctors can now prescribe medical cannabis directly without prior authorisation from the government.

Medical cannabis is primarily used for chronic pain, spasticity associated with multiple sclerosis and neurological diseases, and nausea or appetite loss during chemotherapy. However, its therapeutic benefits are still under scientific evaluation, and as a result, health insurance providers do not routinely cover costs for medical cannabis treatments. To improve scientific evidence, a mandatory data collection system has been implemented, requiring prescribing doctors to report treatment outcomes for at least two years.

=== Access and regulations ===
Cannabis-based medicines, including tinctures and oil extracts, must be prescribed by a doctor and dispensed by a pharmacy. The cultivation, processing, and distribution of medical cannabis is regulated under Swissmedic, similar to other controlled substances such as morphine or methadone. Although the recreational use of cannabis remains illegal, certain pilot projects are being conducted in Swiss cities to study the impact of controlled access to cannabis.

Swiss authorities continue to monitor the therapeutic effects and prescription patterns of cannabis-based treatments through ongoing data collection and scientific evaluations.

== Reform attempts ==
In 2001, the Swiss Federal Council (government) committed to implement changes as to decriminalisation of personal use and possession, and the Parliament was tasked to tender concrete approaches.

An attempt to decriminalise possession and consumption of cannabis failed narrowly in Parliament in 2004. As a reaction, a popular initiative ("Eidgenössische Volksinitiative für eine vernünftige Hanf-Politik mit wirksamem Jugendschutz") to amend the constitution to legalise cannabis was introduced 2004.

A referendum was launched in 2008. Results from the November 2008 referendum showed 36.7% of those voting supported legalising cannabis.

=== Decriminalisation ===
Since 28 September 2012, the possession of less than 10 grams (1/3 oz) of cannabis was no longer a criminal infringement, but was still punished by a 100 Swiss francs flat fine. Professional cannabis trade, as well as the possession of a quantity of cannabis that can affect the health of a large number of people (4 kg; 9 lb of hashish, according to the Federal Court), are punished by one to three years of imprisonment that can be augmented with a fine.

In September 2017, the Federal Supreme Court ruled that the flat fine for the sole possession of small amounts was applied incorrectly since 2013, and that only the consumption of cannabis can be fined, not possession by itself. As a consequence, most cantonal police departments changed their policy towards stopping the prosecution of small amounts of cannabis, while others had already done so earlier. However, the cantons of Geneva, Vaud, Valais, Neuchâtel, Jura, Ticino, St. Gallen and Appenzell retained their old policy.

The Federal Supreme Court further decided in July 2023 that the sole possession of up to 10 grams (1/3 oz) of cannabis which is not meant for sale is completely legal and therefore the police cannot confiscate this amount. Nevertheless, the fine and confiscation is still due if consumption is present.

With the exception of a few cannabis clubs in larger Swiss cities, requiring extensive bureaucratic paperwork to be a member, Cannabis consumers in Switzerland are relying on the black market to obtain cannabis. In 2023, synthetic cannabinoids have also been increasingly consumed in Switzerland, with detrimental health effects for the user. In Germany and other European countries, the growing of a limited amount of THC cannabis plants is legal, and cannabis up to 25g per person is no longer considered a narcotic in Germany. Switzerland has favoured criminal prosecution of natural cannabis cultivation, and invested very little expertise in the research of the drug.

=== Canton legalisation and reversal ===
On 5 October 2012, the Federal Court invalidated the agreement on cannabis growing and trading that came into force on 1 January 2012, which allowed private citizens in the cantons of Geneva, Freiburg, Valais, Vaud, Neuchâtel, Basel-Stadt and Ticino to grow up to four cannabis plants (containing less than 1.0% of THC), for violating the Federal Narcotics Act.

=== Renewed legalisation attempts ===
On 11 September 2018, a parliamentary initiative by the Green Party, that demanded a law on regulation of cultivation, trade, recreational consumption, youth protection, and taxing of cannabis, was rejected in the National Council by 104 to 86 votes. Meanwhile the "Legalize It" organization is preparing a second popular initiative, originally set to launch in April 2018.

=== Pilot trials ===
In Switzerland, pilot trials for recreational cannabis dispensing are currently underway.

==== Genesis of the project ====
In 2016, the cities of Geneva, Basel, Bern, and Zürich stated that they planned to establish pilot cannabis clubs to gauge their utility, limited to 2,000 members total and to be studied for four years. Those pilot projects have been shut down by the Federal Office of Public Health in November 2017 because of the lack of legal basis. In December 2017, an absolute majority of members of both parliamentary chambers signed a parliamentary motion to change the law. However, in June 2018, the motion was narrowly rejected by the National Council after it had passed the Council of States. In July 2018, the Federal Council sent a proposition for future cannabis studies to the parliament anyway.

In 2019, Swiss parliament stopped a research project by the University of Bern that intended to make cannabis available for scientific studies. Particularly members of the conservative-right Swiss People’s Party and Centrists voted against the continuation of research in the field. In the meantime, registered cannabis preparations as well as the herb drug made it into mainstream medicine, and cannabis research has moved to the forefront of modern pharmacological research, particularly in the Americas and in countries with regulated, legal cannabis use.

==== Legal changes ====
On 25 September 2020, the Swiss parliament approved an amendment to the Federal Act on Narcotics and Psychotropic Substances (NarcA), which came into effect on 15 May 2021. The amendment provides the legal basis for scientific trials with selected groups of recreational cannabis users residing in Switzerland, and establishes a federally regulated cultivation and harvesting process for narcotic cannabis with dosage/potency limitations (20% THC), limits for pesticide residues, and warning label requirements. Additives to cannabis products will also have to undergo federal approval, and need to be declared. Federal ordinances will remain in effect for 10 years, determining the individual criteria for trial participants, and regulating the national production and trade of psychotropic cannabis (made in Switzerland).

In parallel, in October 2021, a parliamentary commission ruled cannabis should no longer be banned and Switzerland is going to draw up a draft law for the legalisation of cannabis "for better youth and consumer protection”.

A number of larger Swiss cities and municipalities have expressed interest to participate in the pilot trials, but will have to prove first that recreational cannabis is not negatively affecting the well-being of the general population. Starting in 2022, approved Swiss cannabis users will have the opportunity to obtain cannabis at local pharmacies under these strict regulations set forth by the Federal Office of Public Health (FOPH).

==== First pilot projects ====
The FOPH has authorised 19 April 2022 the first pilot test of an adult buyer program for recreational use of cannabis in Basel. This is expected to provide data on the way forward to regulate purchasing and consumption of recreationally used cannabis.

The program is expected to last 2 years and will include 400 adult volunteers who are to have their health monitored. The program, developed over the course of 6 years, was held up for legal reasons but the narcotics law was changed in 2021 and in August of that year was allowed to move forward.

Four cannabis strains will be made available, and two strains of hash will be available to a small group of approved volunteers in 10 pharmacies in Basel, produced by Pure Holding A.G. Participants of the program are to be warned not to share their cannabis with non-participants or they may be removed from the trial program.

Originally scheduled to begin in September 2022, the "Weed Care" program started on 31 January 2023 with the possibility for a first half of the 374 participants to buy cannabis legally. The study will last until March 2025 at least.

==== Cannabis Research Zurich ====
The cannabis trial project "Cannabis Research Zurich" started in May 2023 and is expected to run until December 2028. It is the second cannabis pilot project in the Canton of Zurich after the "Züri Can" project and is planned to have a total of 7,500 participants, making it the largest pilot project in Switzerland to date. Volunteers residing in the cities of Schlieren, Horgen, Zurich, Winterthur, Wetzikon and Dübendorf can sign up for it.

The aim of the trial is to investigate the social and economic consequences of legalising recreational cannabis use in Switzerland. In addition, the study also examines a self-regulation program aimed at preventing excessive cannabis use.

The programme compares behaviour of participants who are able to obtain cannabis legally through the pilot trial (Group A and B) with participants in a control group (Group C) who continue to purchase cannabis on the black market.

A total of five product categories are available: flower, hash, vapes, oils and edibles, ranging from 5% to 20% THC. Participants can purchase these regulated products in specific specialty stores and pharmacies.

=== 2025 draft bill ===
In February 2025, the Social Security and Health Commission of the National Council adopted a draft bill to reform cannabis law. The draft law was adopted by 14 votes to 9, with 2 abstentions. The draft law permitted legalisation of cannabis, with adults allowed to grow, buy, own and consume cannabis, with some restrictions. Adults would be permitted to grow a maximum of three plants and the sale of cannabis products would be limited to licensed non-profit outlets with a goal to reduce the risk of addiction and render assistance to those who need it. The draft bill continued to classify cannabis as a harmful narcotic. The draft bill also mandates that sales would be tracked electronically, utilising the system that the pilot projects have been trialing.

At the end of August 2025, a Consultation on the Cannabis Products Act was opened, which allowed all interested parties to submit comments until 1 December 2025.

== Penalties ==
The penalties imposed in practice also vary among cantons to a certain degree. The 2007 penalty guidelines adopted by the Bernse Judges' Association provide as follows:

Infraction	Penalty
Possession of less than 10 grams (1/3 oz) of cannabis not meant for sale	No fine and no confiscation. If the user has committed a crime or actively consumed the drug, it can be confiscated.
Consumption of soft drugs in normal cases (first infraction, or minor quantity, or brief period of consumption)	Fine of 100 CHF
Consumption of soft drugs, repeated infractions	Increasing fine or monetary penalty (depending on the severity of the infraction and the accused's financial circumstances).
Trade in soft drugs, up to 100 g (3 1/2 oz)	Monetary penalty of 1–5 daily rates. The daily rate is set by the court and usually amounts to roughly one thirtieth of the accused's monthly income.
Trade in soft drugs, 100 g to 1 kg (3 1/2 oz to 2 lb)	Monetary penalty of 5–30 daily rates.
Trade in soft drugs, 1 kg (2 lb) or more	Monetary penalty of more than 30 daily rates.
Possession of more than 4 kg (9 lb)	One to three years of imprisonment

== See also ==
- Association of Swiss Hemp Friends
- Crime in Switzerland#Drugs
- Effects of cannabis
- Tobacco industry in Switzerland
- Tobacco legislation in Switzerland
