= Tobacco legislation in Switzerland =

Federal and cantonal tobacco laws in Switzerland

Tobacco Products Act
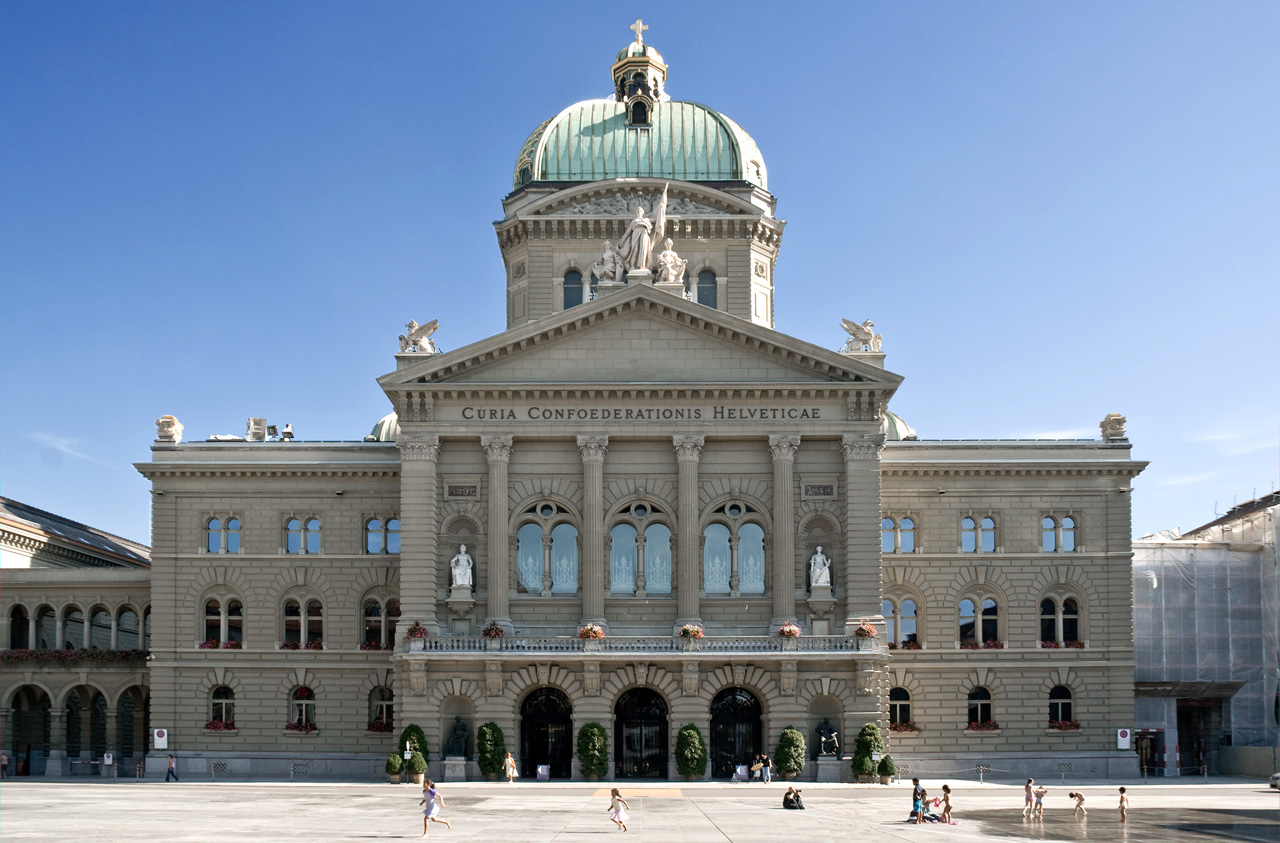

Federal Assembly of Switzerland
- Long title: Federal Act on Tobacco Products and Electronic Cigarettes
- Territorial extent: Switzerland
- Enacted by: Federal Assembly of Switzerland
- Enacted: 1 October 2021
- Commenced: 1 October 2024
- Administered by: Federal Office of Public Health

Repeals
- Ordinance on Tobacco and Tobacco Products

Related legislation
- Ordinance on Tobacco Products and Electronic Cigarettes
- Status: Current legislation

Switzerland has tobacco legislation defined at federal and cantonal level. It covers protection of the population against passive smoking, restrictions on tobacco advertising, warnings on packaging and taxes.

The Federal Act on Tobacco Products and Electronic Cigarettes (TobPA) came into force on 1 October 2024. It harmonised a series of measures at the federal level.

== History ==
The WHO Framework Convention on Tobacco Control came into force in 2005. It has been ratified by 181 countries (in orange on the map), but not yet by Switzerland.

In Switzerland, cigarette sales peaked in 1972. Switzerland is one of the few European countries (along with Monaco and Liechtenstein) not to have ratified the WHO Framework Convention on Tobacco Control (FCTC). It signed it on 25 June 2004, but will only be able to proceed with ratification once it has brought its national legislation into line with the treaty, in accordance with Swiss law on international treaties. In 2015, ratification was included in the 2020 objectives of the Federal Office of Public Health.

A Tobacco Bill was proposed by the Federal Council in November 2015. It aimed to strengthen protection against smoking, but was considered "a minimal project [...] lagging behind certain measures taken in foreign countries" by Alain Berset, the Federal Councillor and head of the Federal Department of Home Affairs behind the project. However, it was considered too restrictive by the Health Committee of the Council of States, which rejected it. A new version of the bill, proposed in December 2017, dropped the bans on cinema, poster and press advertising. It failed to enable Switzerland to achieve its goal of ratifying the WHO Framework Convention, and was deemed clearly insufficient by Swiss prevention circles, who campaigned for a total ban on advertising and sponsorship of public or private events.

A new bill was put out to consultation in 2018, with almost no new advertising restrictions. The Swiss federal popular initiative "Tobacco-Free Children" was launched in March 2018 to propose a more ambitious law to control advertising. It was accepted by popular vote in 2022.

In October 2021, the Federal Assembly passed a federal law on tobacco products and electronic cigarettes (Tobacco Products Act, LPTab; fr: Loi fédérale sur les produits du tabac et les cigarettes électroniques; de: Bundesgesetz über Tabakprodukte und elektronische Zigaretten; it: legge federale sui prodotti del tabacco e le sigarette elettroniche). It came into force on 1 October 2024.

== Passive smoking ==
=== Federal law ===
Federal Act on Protection against Passive Smoking
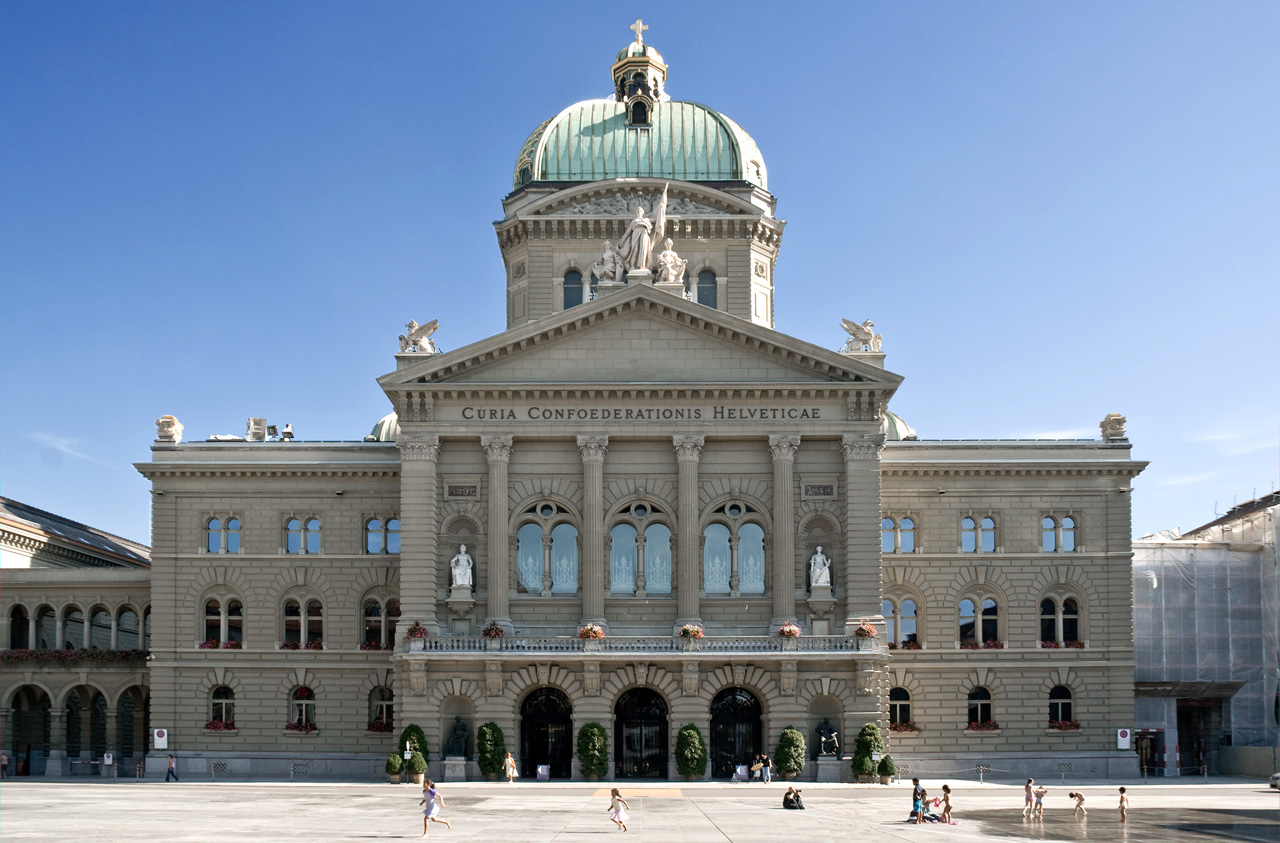

Federal Assembly of Switzerland
- Long title: Federal Act on Protection against Passive Smoking
- Territorial extent: Switzerland
- Enacted by: Federal Assembly of Switzerland
- Enacted: 3 October 2008
- Commenced: 1 May 2010
- Administered by: Federal Office of Public Health

Related legislation
- Ordinance on Protection against Passive Smoking
- Status: Current legislation

A federal parliamentary initiative was launched in 2004 by National Councillor Felix Gutzwiller to strengthen protection against passive smoking in public places. It proposed amending the Labor Act to establish the principle that workers should be able to carry out their activities without being exposed to passive smoke. This initiative was accepted by the National Council on 4 October 2007.

Following the referendum, a law was introduced at federal level in 2010. It imposed the principle that smoking was prohibited in public places and workplaces, but did not apply to catering establishments of less than 80 square meters, which could be operated as smoking establishments. Served smoking rooms were also permitted.

The right-wing parties opposed the text and defended the "right to smoke" and the freedom of shopkeepers to decide whether or not their establishments would be smoking, in the name in particular of the attractiveness of Switzerland as a tourist destination, while the left-wing parties defended a more general ban.

A new initiative to strengthen this ban was rejected on 23 September 2012, including by the cantons that had overwhelmingly approved the imposition of additional restrictions at home. The canton of Geneva was the only one to vote overwhelmingly in favour of a stricter ban at federal level.

In 2024, the law is updated to explicitly include heated tobacco products and electronic cigarettes.

=== Cantonal laws ===
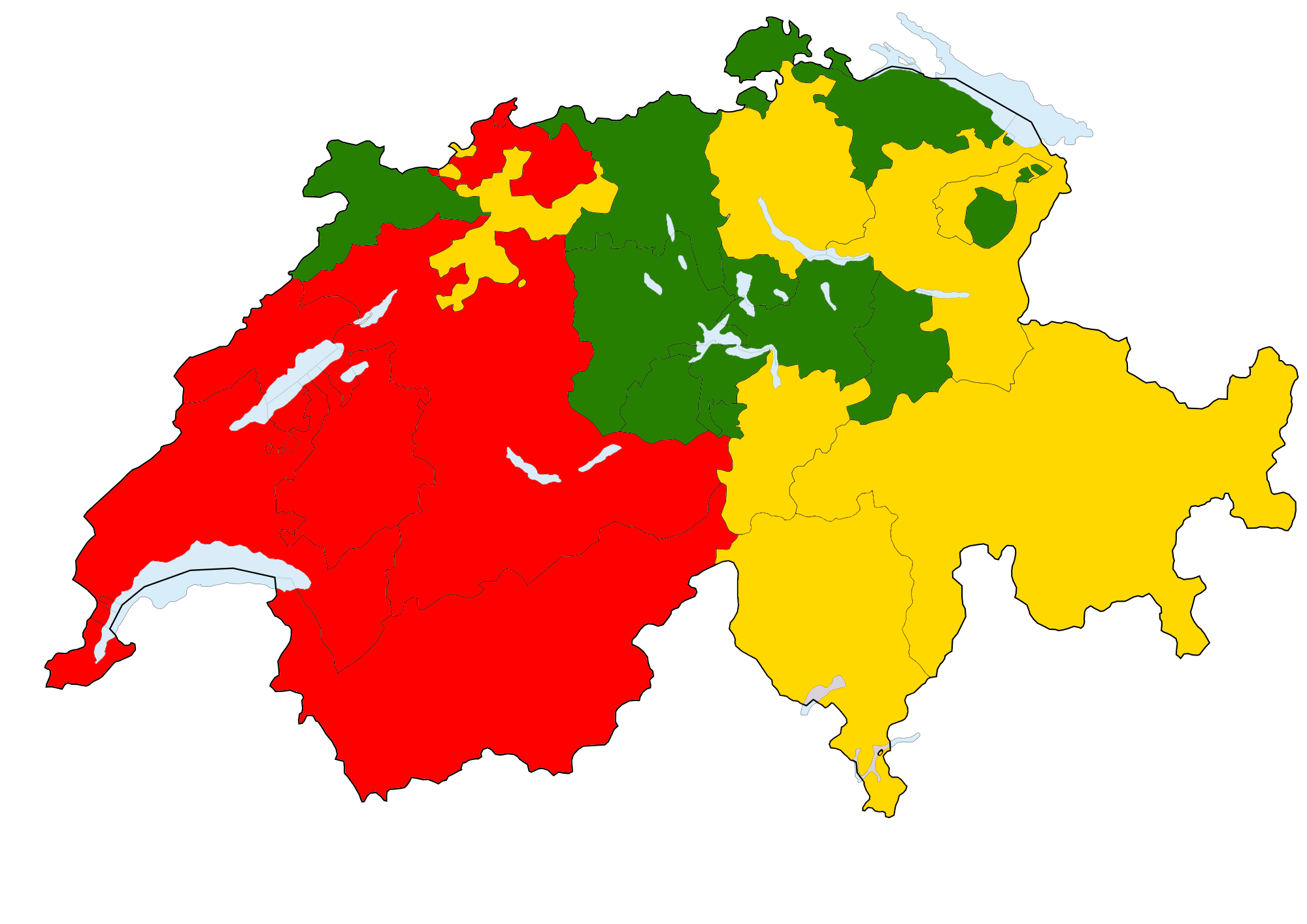
Cantonal smoking bans in restaurants Smokehouses without service authorized (smoking establishments prohibited) Smoking rooms with authorized service (smoking prohibited) Smoking establishments (up to 80 m2) authorized

In Switzerland, each canton can legislate in its own area of jurisdiction (e.g. health and hygiene). Cantons are thus able to enact laws that are more restrictive than federal law.

Swiss cantons can be broadly grouped into three categories:

1. The most restrictive have adopted a law similar to that found in countries such as France and the UK: smoking is banned in all cafés and restaurants, whatever their size. Smoking rooms are authorized under certain conditions, but no services may be provided. These are the following cantons: Basel-Stadt, Basel-Landschaft, Fribourg, Geneva, Neuchâtel, Valais and Vaud;
2. Others have adopted a more restrictive jurisdiction than the federal law, banning smoking establishments but authorizing serviced smoking rooms. These are the cantons: Appenzell Ausserrhoden, Bern, Graubünden, St. Gallen, Solothurn, Ticino, Uri and Zurich;
3. The other cantons simply apply federal law. These are the following cantons: Aargau, Appenzell Innerrhoden, Glarus, Jura, Lucerne, Nidwalden, Obwalden, Schaffhausen, Schwyz, Thurgau and Zug.

Almost all the French-speaking cantons belong to the first category; only the canton of Jura is limited to applying federal law. In contrast, the cantons in the third category are almost all German-speaking.

Detailed information on some cantons that have adopted laws more restrictive than the federal law:

- Ticino: Smoking is banned in all public establishments. However, the possibility of setting up smoking rooms, based on the Italian model, is reserved. This law was the subject of a referendum tabled by the Lega dei Ticinesi party, which considered it liberticidal. On 12 March 2006, the people of Ticino voted 79% in favor of the ban;
- Solothurn: Smoking is now banned in all public buildings and establishments in Solothurn. However, smoking rooms with separate ventilation may be installed in buildings. An initiative to relax the ban, supported by the Liberal-Radical Party, was rejected on 11 June 2010 by 66% of voters;
- Geneva: Cantonal popular initiative 129, entitled "Fumée passive et santé" (lit. French for "Passive smoking and health") and supported by CIPRET-Genève and the OxyRomandie association, was submitted on 6 July 2005, with 20,230 signatures. The initiative called for a ban on smoking in public establishments without the possibility of setting up a smoking room (following the Irish model). It was appealed to the Federal Supreme Court by the law firm defending Japan Tobacco International (JTI). After the Federal Court rejected the appeal on 29 March 2007, the Geneva initiative was put to the vote on 24 February 2008, and accepted by just under 80% of voters. While waiting for the Geneva Parliament to enact a law, the executive issued a transitional regulation to ban smoking in public places from 1 July 2008. However, this regulation was contested and challenged before the Federal Court, both by opponents and supporters of the ban. The latter criticized the regulation for containing too many exceptions (by authorizing, for example, smoking in so-called private places such as hotel rooms or prison cells), while the opponents of the ban demanded the right to smoke freely in smoking rooms or establishments reserved for smokers. In addition, they question the validity of the transitional regulation, given that it was promulgated by the executive rather than the legislative branch, which would be contrary to the separation of powers. On 30 September 2008, the Federal Court accepted this last argument: the provisional regulation, deemed unconstitutional, was annulled, and smoking was once again permitted in Geneva's public places. On 22 January 2009, the Grand Council promulgated a new law (K118), known as the "Law on banning smoking in public places (LIF)". This law was opposed by a request for a referendum, which obtained 12,000 signatures (7,000 signatures were required for a successful referendum in the canton of Geneva). On 27 September 2009, the population once again voted in favor of the smoking ban, this time by 82%. The law came into force in November 2009;
- Fribourg, Neuchâtel and Vaud: cantonal popular initiatives, entitled "Fumée passive et santé" (lit. French for "Passive smoking and health"), were launched in these cantons with the support of the Coalition romande contre la fumée passive (lit. French for "French-speaking coalition against passive smoking"), which was formed in December 2005 for this purpose, and the OxyRomandie association, whose aim is to combat passive smoking in French-speaking Switzerland. In 2009 and 2010, this resulted in a ban on smoking in all public places in these three cantons, including cafés and restaurants, except in smoking rooms that met certain conditions: they had to be properly ventilated and must not be places where people passed through; they were also forbidden to minors and must not offer services;
- Valais: On 14 February 2008, the Valais Grand Council approved a health law banning smoking in public establishments. The debates were stormy, but the law was eventually accepted by 75 votes to 31, with 9 abstentions. A referendum against the ban was rejected on 30 November 2008 by 80% of voters in the French-speaking part and 67% in the German-speaking part of the canton;
- Zurich: On 28 September 2008, the people of Zurich voted on an initiative by the Lung League to ban smoking in all enclosed public places, without exception. However, in the name of economic and individual freedoms, the Zurich government had decided to oppose this initiative with a counter-proposal that would have authorized operators to install separate, adequately ventilated rooms for smokers. In addition, establishments with fewer than 35 seats would only have to clearly indicate whether or not smoking was permitted. Zurich voters rejected the counter-proposal and approved the Lung League's initiative with 57% of the vote. However, the text remained relatively unrestrictive, since smoking rooms with service were authorized;
- Basel-Stadt: On 28 September 2008, 53% of Basel's population voted in favor of the Lung League's initiative to ban smoking in all public places. Several initiatives have been launched since then to reverse this ban, so far without success.

== Tobacco advertising ==
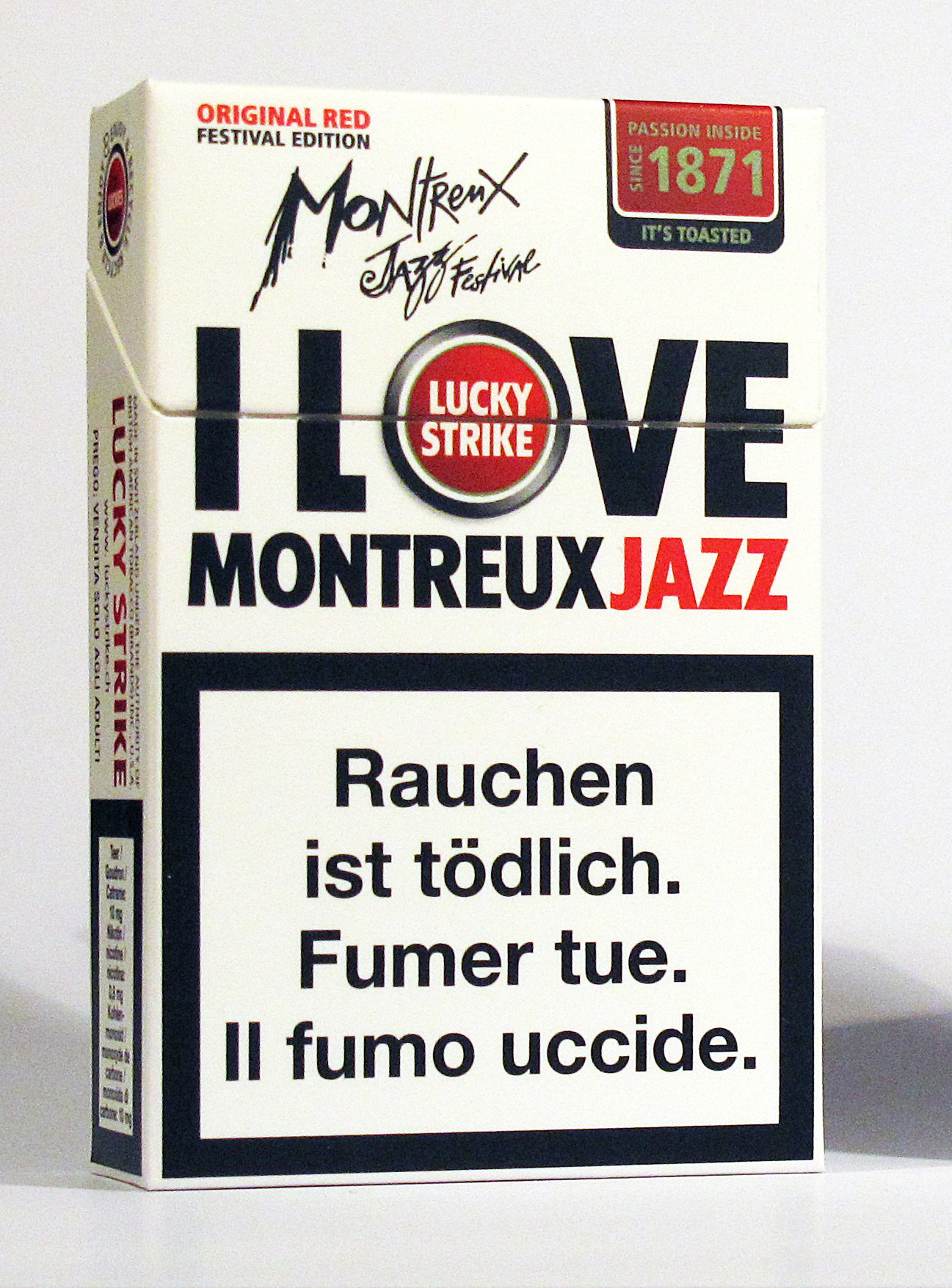
Sponsorship of the Montreux Jazz Festival by British American Tobacco in 2012.

Unlike other European countries, tobacco advertising is still very present in Switzerland, particularly at points of sale, discotheques and youth festivals. Advertising is regulated, but the legislation is not as strict as elsewhere.

=== Federal law ===
Tobacco product advertising is banned on radio and television (Article 10 of the Federal Law on Radio and Television), but remains authorized in newspapers, at points of sale, in festivals, on the internet, as well as direct promotion aimed at adults (and, until October 2024, on billboards and in cinemas). A large number of cultural events are sponsored by the tobacco industry, which takes advantage of the opportunity to carry out promotional operations (special cigarette packs for the event, for example). Many festivals are sponsored by the tobacco industry. Switzerland is the last European country, along with Belarus, to authorize tobacco industry sponsorship of events.

The project of Federal Act on Tobacco Products was published in 2014 and would restrict tobacco advertising, but without affecting sponsorship. The advertising industry is opposed. Federal Councillor Alain Berset's proposal for a partial ban was rejected by the Council of States in June 2016, then by the National Council on 8 December 2016, despite 58% of the population declaring themselves in favor of a total ban, as practiced in France and Italy, for example.

Faced with the bill's lack of ambition, the Swiss federal popular initiative "Tobacco-Free Children" was launched in March 2018 to obtain a ban, for tobacco products, on "all forms of advertising that reach children and young people". It is supported by health and youth organizations and can be signed online as well as in doctors' offices and pharmacies. The ban would apply in particular to advertising in cinemas, on billboards and at points of sale. The initiative committee is chaired by Hans Stöckli. On 26 August 2020, the Federal Council proposed that Parliament recommend rejection of the initiative.

In September 2019, the Council of States proposed banning advertising in magazines and on the internet, as well as tobacco industry sponsorship of international events or events organized by the Confederation, cantons or municipalities. Under this proposal, advertising in cinemas, on everyday consumer goods, at points of sale and by direct mail to adults would remain authorized. The "Tobacco-Free Children" initiative was put to the vote on 13 February 2022. It was accepted by 57% of voters.

In October 2024, the Federal Act on Tobacco Products came into force. It prohibits advertising in public places, public transport, cinemas and sporting events, as well as the distribution of free tobacco products or electronic cigarettes. Where advertising is still allowed, a mandatory health warnings must be included.

=== Cantonal laws ===
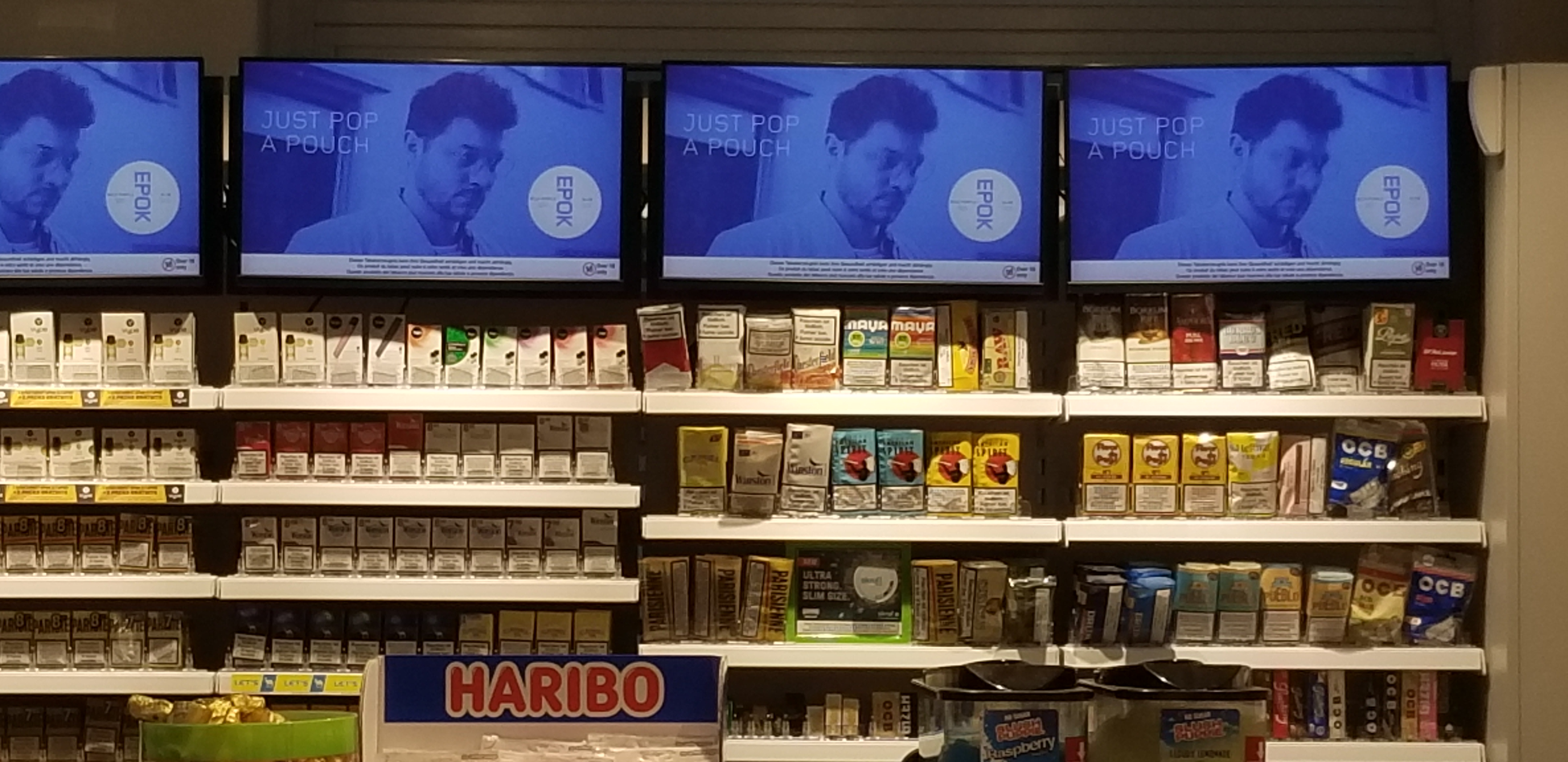
Tobacco shop in Neuchâtel: advertising allowed inside the store.

Some cantons impose additional restrictions on tobacco advertising, particularly with regard to public signs and signs visible from the public domain. As of 2024, 16 cantons ban the display of tobacco product advertising in public spaces (8 will also for e-cigarettes); 14 will also ban it in private spaces if visible to the public (7 do the same for e-cigarettes).

A small number of cantons also ban cinema advertising (Geneva, Obwalden, St. Gallen, Solothurn and Valais), sponsorship activities (Solothurn and Valais) and advertisement inside shops (Valais).

== Tobacco sale age ==
In 2006, Vaud became the first canton of Switzerland to ban tobacco sales to minors.

As of 2024, sixteen cantons ban the sale of tobacco products to minors under the age of 18. Eight other cantons have set the limit at 16 and two cantons have no limit. Eleven of them also ban the sale of electronic cigarettes to minors.

Since 1 October 2024, the Federal Act on Tobacco Products and Electronic Cigarettes bans the sale to minors (under 18) throughout Switzerland.

== Taxation ==
Federal Act on Tobacco Taxation
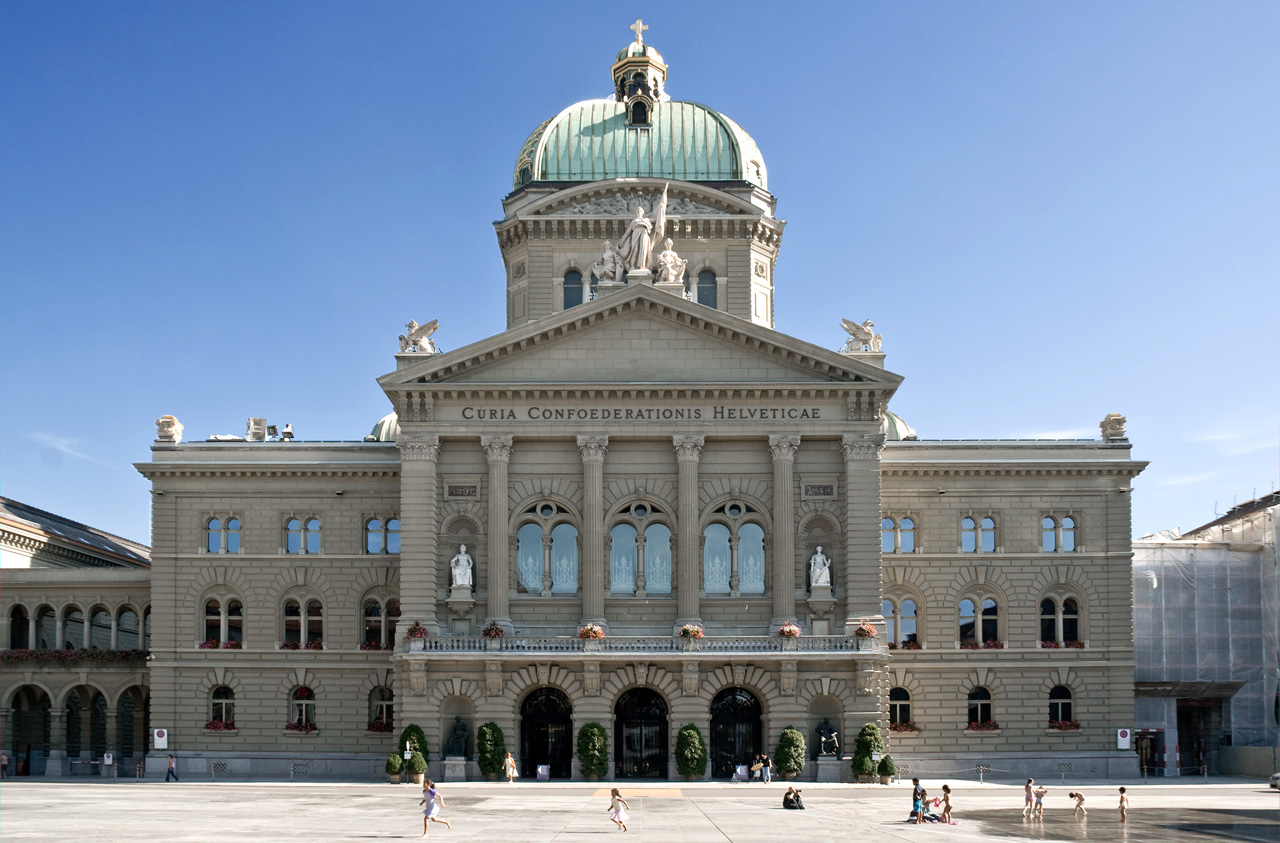

Federal Assembly of Switzerland
- Long title: Federal Act on Tobacco Taxation
- Territorial extent: Switzerland
- Enacted by: Federal Assembly of Switzerland
- Enacted: 21 March 1969
- Commenced: 1 January 1970
- Administered by: Federal Office for Customs and Border Security

Related legislation
- Ordinance on Tobacco Taxation
- Status: Current legislation

Tobacco taxation is governed by the Federal Tobacco Tax Act (fr: Loi fédérale sur l'imposition du tabac; de: Bundesgesetz über die Tabakbesteuerung; it: Legge sull’imposizione del tabacco).

Conventional cigarettes are taxed at 50%; other tobacco products are taxed at a lower rate, including heated tobacco products at 12% and snus at 6% until 2024. Since January 2025, heated tobacco products are taxed at 16% and snus at 10%. In October 2024, a modest tax is introduced on electronic cigarettes.

For each pack of cigarettes, in addition to the tobacco tax, manufacturers must pay 2.6 centimes to the Tobacco Prevention Fund and 2.6 centimes to the farmers growing tobacco in Switzerland.

== See also ==
- Cannabis in Switzerland
- Health in Switzerland
- List of smoking bans
- Nicotine marketing
- Passive smoking
- Smoking
- Smoking ban
- Smoking in France
- Smoking in Germany
- Tobacco industry in Switzerland
- Tobacco packaging warning messages
- WHO Framework Convention on Tobacco Control
