= Tobacco industry in Switzerland =

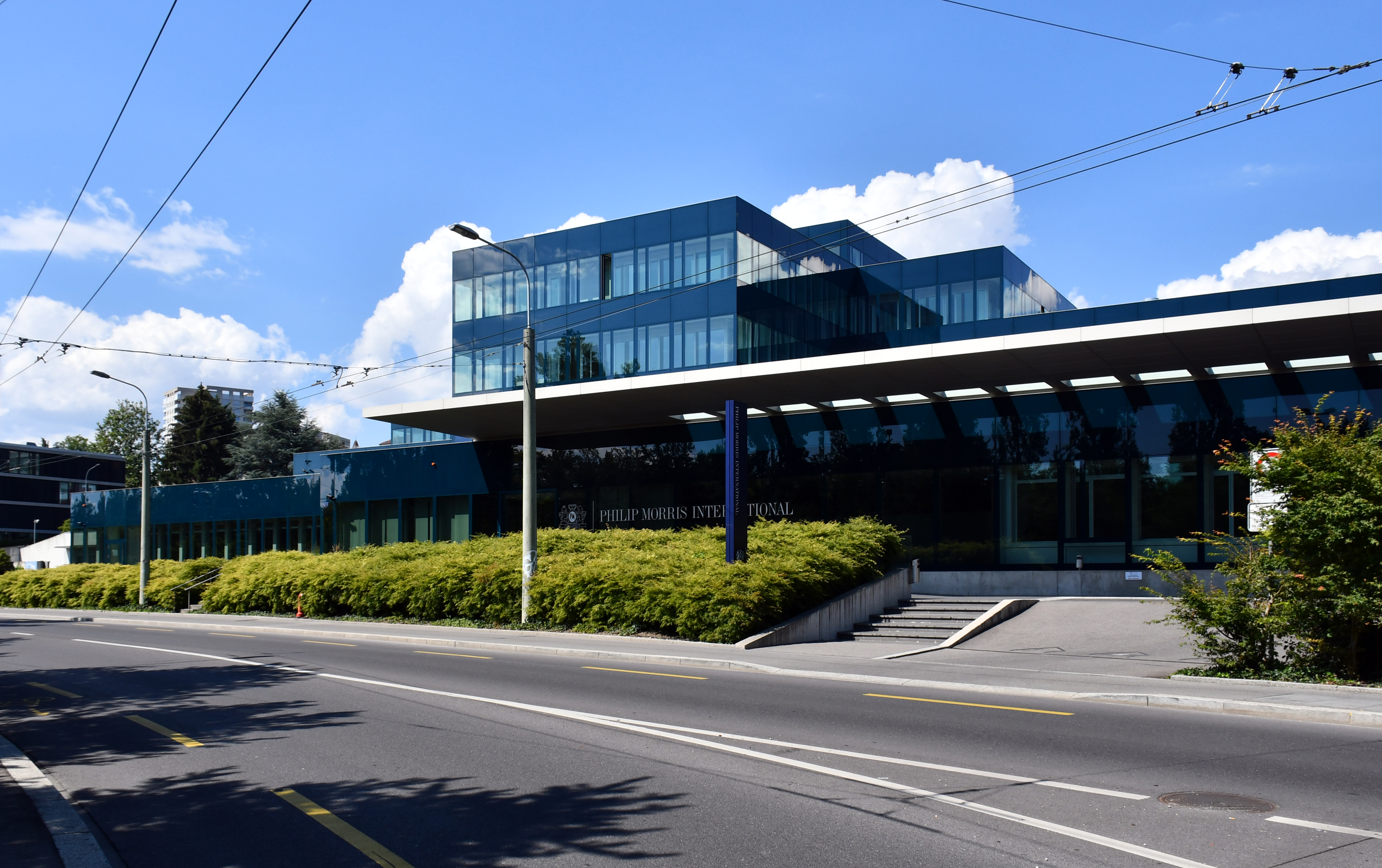
Philip Morris International operational headquarters in Lausanne.

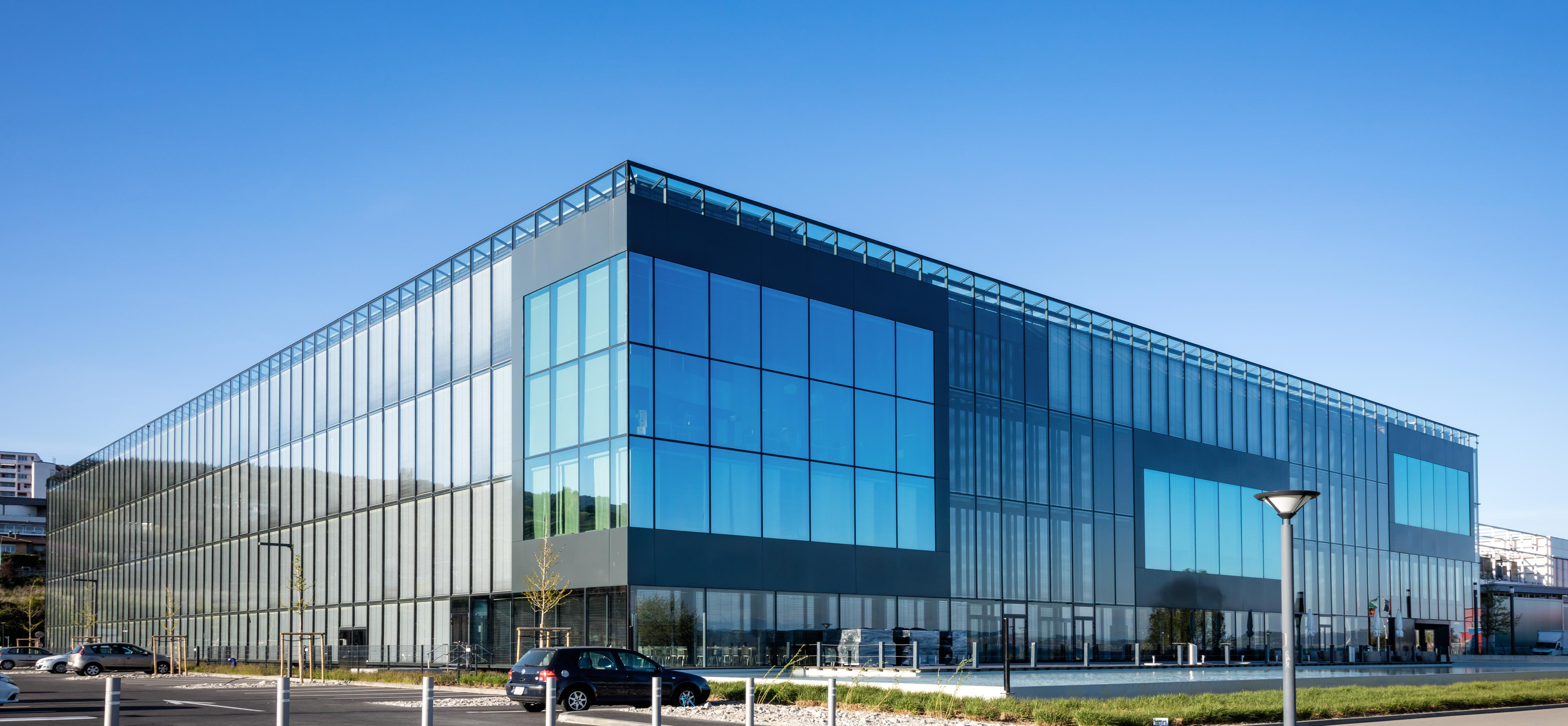
Philip Morris International research and development centre in Neuchâtel.

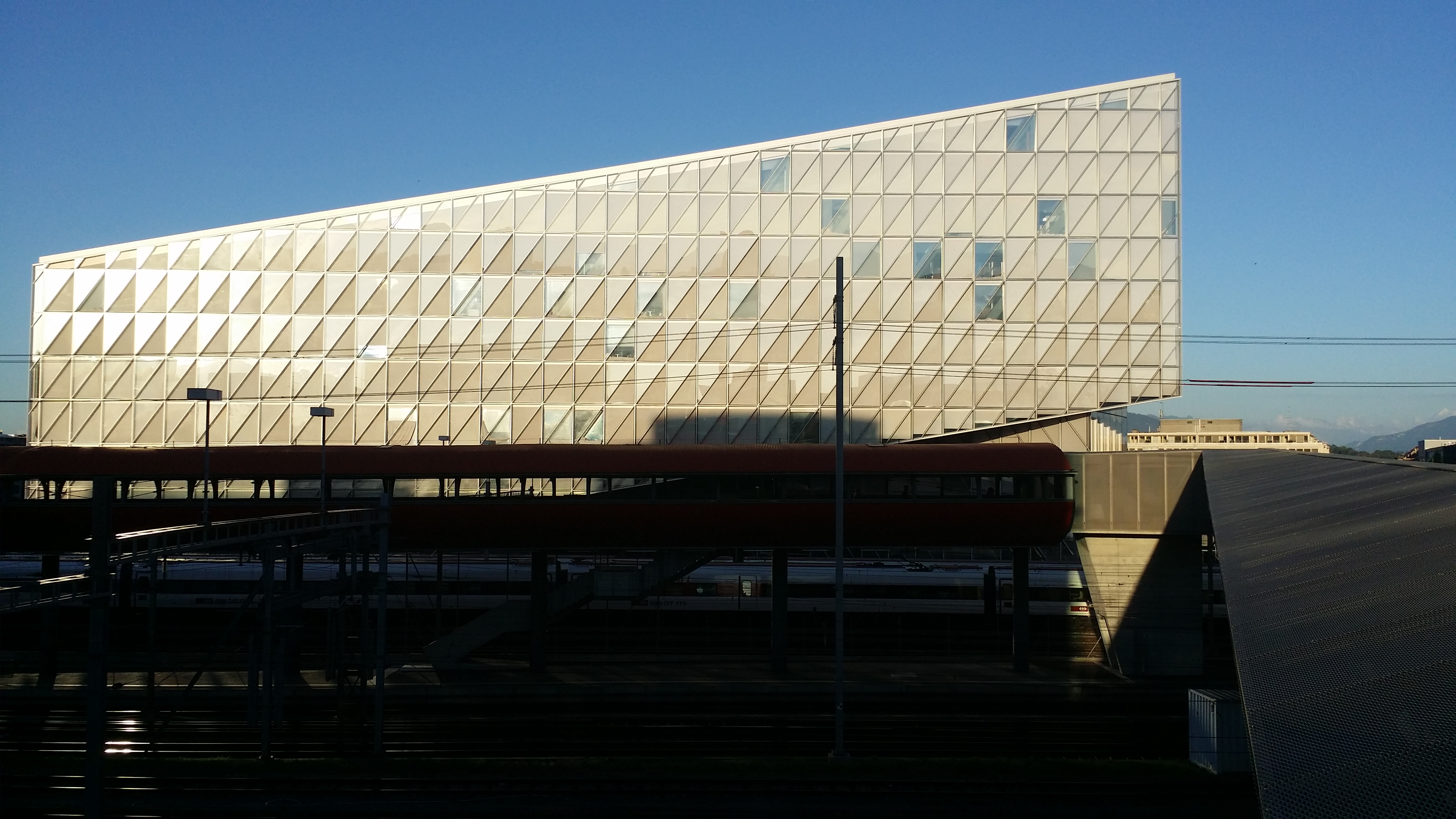
Japan Tobacco International headquarters in Geneva.

The tobacco industry in Switzerland is characterised by cultivation of tobacco, as well as significant presence of factories and headquarters of Big Tobacco.

- Philip Morris International has its worldwide operational headquarters in Lausanne. It also has its research and development centre and a factory in Neuchâtel. Neuchâtel also hosts the headquarters of Philip Morris Products SA.
- Japan Tobacco International has headquarters in Geneva and a factory in Dagmersellen.
- British American Tobacco has offices for the Swiss market in Lausanne.

== History ==
In the 18th century, the first Swiss tobacco factories were established.

Most cigarette manufacturers (such as Fivaz, Frossard, Burrus, Vautier, Rinsoz, Ormond, Burger, Wuhrmann, Brissago and Davidoff) have been bought out by Big Tobacco. For instance, in 1963, the Fabriques de tabac réunies were acquired by Philip Morris International. Villiger Sons remain independent.

Between 1962 and the 1990s, the 'Scientific Commission' of the Swiss Cigarette Manufacturers Association was involved in public relations and lobbying. It also organized pro-tobacco scientific meetings opposing public health regulations.

The number of hectares of tobacco cultivated has halved in 50 years, from 1,100 hectares in 1960 to 517 in 2011. The number of growers has fallen sixfold in 30 years, from 1,200 in 1978 to 209 in 2011.

In 2016, Switzerland produced 35 billion cigarettes: 25 % were sold in the country and 75% were exported. Unlike in the European Union, the Swiss law allows to export cigarettes which do not meet local standards (that is to say, which are even more addictive and toxic than those marketed in the country). The three main destinations were Japan, Morocco and South Africa.

In 2023, British American Tobacco closed its Swiss factory (which was located in Boncourt) and transferred the production to bigger factories in Europe.

== Impact ==
The WHO Framework Convention on Tobacco Control came into force in 2005. It has been ratified by 181 countries (in orange on the map), but not yet by Switzerland.

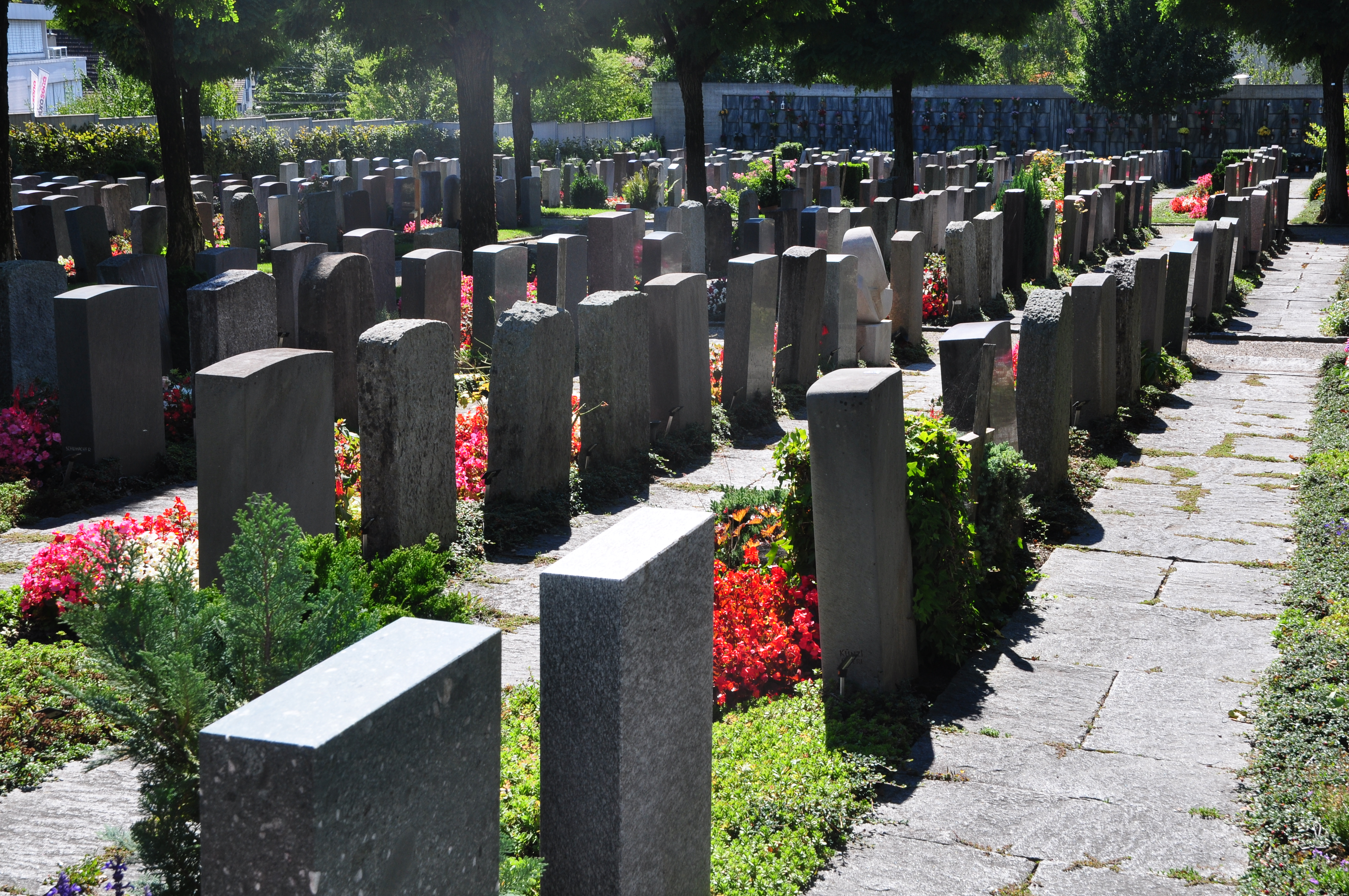
Tobacco use kills 10,000 people every year in Switzerland, making smoking the leading preventable cause of death.

The heavy presence of tobacco industry multinational corporation is partly explained by Swiss legislation, generally attractive to businesses and specifically with weaker tobacco regulation than the European Union and the United States. Also, the industry's operations were thus immune from United States judiciary investigations. Another likely factor is the presence of the World Health Organization in Geneva, which promotes tobacco control and which the industry is trying to influence.

Switzerland is one of the few countries which is not part of the WHO Framework Convention on Tobacco Control (together with handful of tobacco-growing states, such as Argentina, Malawi and the United States). The tobacco industry has a significant influence on Swiss policy. The tobacco industry is a major obstacle to tobacco prevention.

According to the Tobacco Control Scale 2021, Switzerland is second to last in Europe with regard to the implementation of tobacco control policies. The country is second to last in the Global Tobacco Industry Interference Index 2025, one of the worst records in this regard.

Tobacco use kills 10,000 people every year in Switzerland, making smoking the leading preventable cause of death.

== See also ==
- Cannabis in Switzerland
- Smoking in Switzerland
- Tobacco legislation in Switzerland
- WHO Framework Convention on Tobacco Control
