= Daniel Koch (physician) =

Swiss physician and federal employee (born 1955)

- Born: 13 April 1955 (age 71); Biel/Bienne, Switzerland
- Education: University of Berne; Johns Hopkins University
- Known for: COVID-19 pandemic Swiss federal spokesperson (since end 2019) and BAG/OFSP/UFSP official

Daniel Koch (born 13 April 1955) is a Swiss physician and federal employee. From 2008 to 2020 he was the head of the Swiss federal section "Communicable Diseases" of the Federal Office of Public Health.

== Life, education, employment ==
Koch studied medicine at the University of Berne in the 1970s, then he worked as an assistant doctor for several years. From 1988 to 2002 he worked for the International Committee of the Red Cross (ICRC) in Geneva, first as medical coordinator in crisis areas, including during the civil war in Sierra Leone, Uganda, South Africa and Peru. From 1997, he worked as a medical officer at the ICRC headquarters, where he was responsible for the medical programmes in Africa. In 1996/97, Koch complemented his education with postgraduate studies at the Johns Hopkins University in Baltimore, USA, which he completed with a Master in Public Health (MPH). Since 2002, he has worked for the FOPH in various departments. He was a member of the task force against the 2002/2003 SARS pandemic and H5N1 avian flu. Until 2006 he was head of the "Vaccinations" section. From 2006 to 2008 he headed the "Pandemic Preparedness" section, and again until 30 April 2020 he was the head of the section.

Koch gained nationwide recognition during the worldwide COVID-19 pandemic in Switzerland through his media presence in the Swiss media as head of the FOPH's "Communicable Diseases" section. During the pandemic's first wave in spring, Koch continued to work as the FOPH's delegate and public representative for COVID-19 through June 2020, despite being due to go into pension in April 2020. He was succeeded by Stefan Kuster in his post.

== Personal life ==
Koch lives in Schwarzenburg is divorced and has two adult daughters. In addition to his commitment in the health sector, Koch works for animal protection, and he is a passionate canicross runner.
