= Brazilian Party =

Political organization (1822-1831)

Brazilian Party Partido Brasileiro
- Founded: 1822
- Dissolved: 1831

Brazilian Party (Portuguese: Partido Brasileiro) was a political organization formed in Brazil during the United Kingdom of Portugal, Brazil and the Algarves after the Liberal Revolution of 1820.

Despite not being a formal political party, it united the urban upper bourgeoisie, merchants and slave owners who defended the benefits gained since the arrival of King John VI in Brazil in 1808. It advocated classical liberal agendas, economic conquests and ignored orders from the Portuguese Court. In 1822, it managed to convince Prince Regent Pedro I to remain in Brazil when the Court demanded his return to Portugal; he was the leader of the political group. The party had a huge network. The Angolan branch was responsible for declaring the Brazilian Confederation.

== History ==
At the beginning of the 19th century, the Peninsular War and the Liberal Revolution of Porto occurred in Portugal, which demanded the return of Dom John VI to the country and called elections for the constituent assembly that would draw up the first Portuguese constitution. Upon the news that Brazil was going to be recolonized reaching Portugal, the forces present in Brazil split into three parties: the Brazilian Party and the Portuguese Party, both formed by the elite, and the Liberal-Radical Party, formed by the middle classes of Rio de Janeiro.

Brazilian deputies, most of them linked to the Brazilian Party, were elected by the provinces to participate in the Kingdom's legislature, including Cipriano Barata and Muniz Tavares, who had participated in the Pernambuco Revolution of 1817, Antônio Carlos Ribeiro de Andrada, Father Diogo Antônio Feijó and Nicolau Campos Vergueiro. They arrived in Portugal between August and September 1821, when the constituent work had already begun, and were unable to contribute much towards parity between Brazil and Portugal. The 49 deputies who traveled were outnumbered by the Portuguese representatives, who would not allow them to speak. At the beginning of the regency period, the political forces reorganized and two new parties emerged: the Moderate Party and the Exalted Party.

== See also ==
- Empire of Brazil
- Reign of Pedro I
