= Dia do Fico =

Episode that eventually led to Brazil's declaration of independence

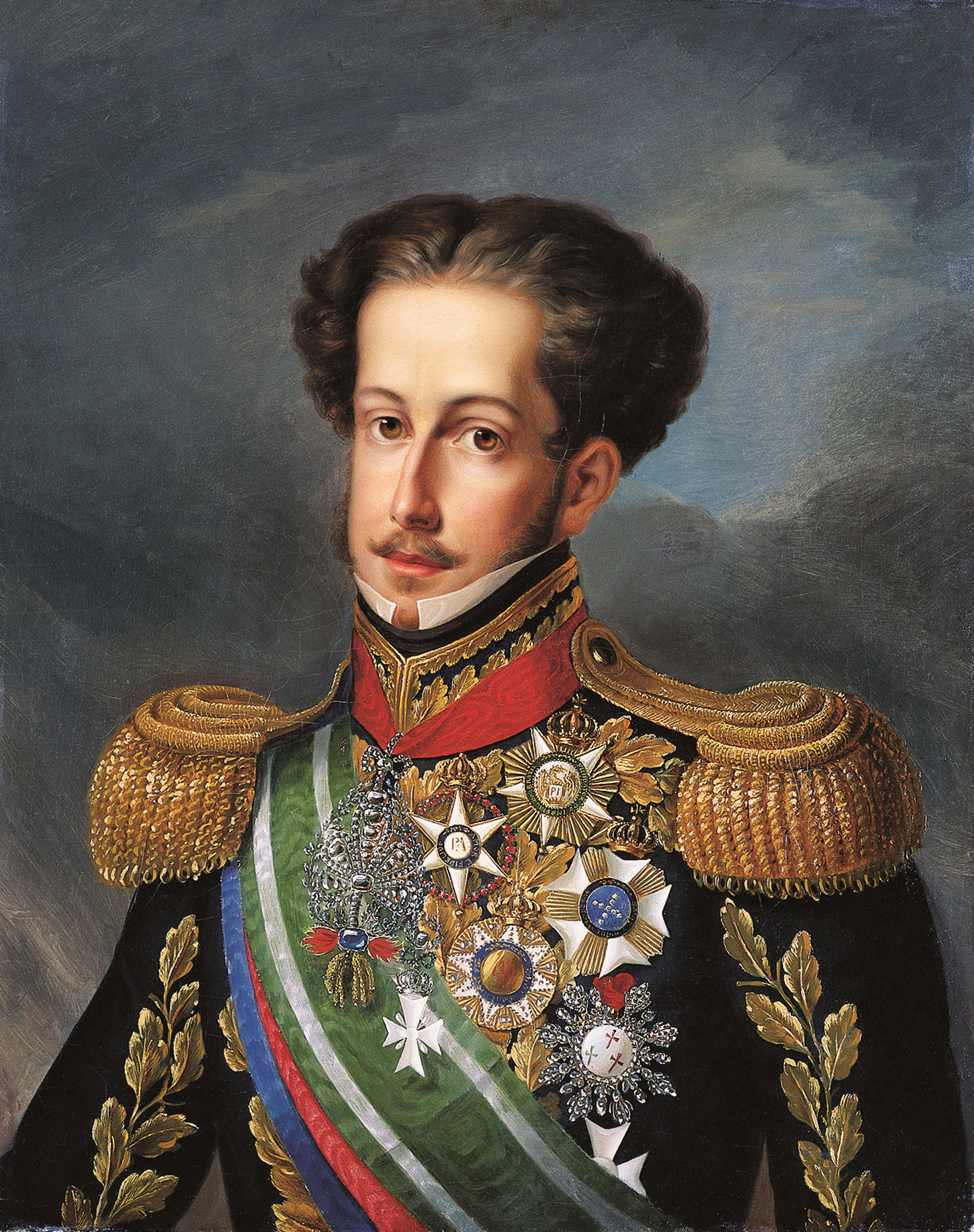
Pedro I.

Dia do fico (lit. Portuguese for "I Stay Day") refers, in Brazilian history, to January 9, 1822. On this day, the then prince Pedro (later Emperor Pedro I) declared that he would not comply with the orders of the Portuguese Cortes that demanded his return to Lisbon.

== Context ==
The document in which the then prince, Pedro, declares that he is staying in Brazil.

With the arrival of the royal family in Brazil, fleeing a possible French invasion in 1808, the country ceased to be only a Portuguese colony and became the center of the Portuguese Empire, with Brazil being elevated to the status of a kingdom in 1815. In 1821, the Liberal Revolution of 1820 broke out. The Portuguese metropolitan political elites installed the Cortes to draw up a constitution and King John VI returned to Portugal, leaving his son, Pedro de Alcântara (Pedro I), as prince regent.

Throughout 1821, when the discussions in the Cortes were moving in the direction of returning Brazil to the status of a colony, the radical liberals joined the Brazilian Party in order to avoid setbacks.

== The Cortes' demands ==
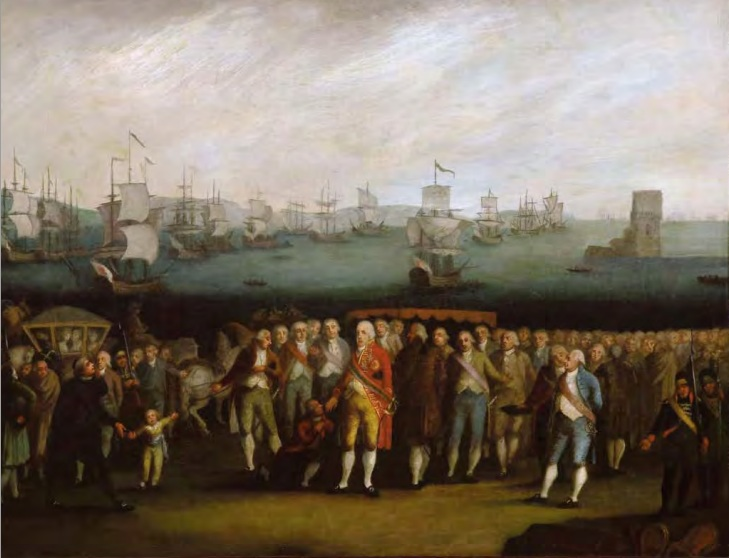
Embarque da família real portuguesa ("Embarkation of the Portuguese royal family") at the Belém pier on November 29, 1807.

The Cortes issued orders to Prince Regent Pedro de Alcântara, one of which demanded his immediate return to Portugal and the appointment of a governing junta for Brazil. In response, the radical liberals organized a movement to gather signatures in favour of the prince's stay, which amounted to 8,000 - resulting in a significant pressure on Pedro. It was then that, contrary to the orders issued by Portugal, he declared to the people:

If it is for the good of all and the general happiness of the nation, I am ready! Tell the people I stay.

== The consequences ==
Fasti at the National Museum in Rio de Janeiro.

As a result of this episode, Pedro I came into direct conflict with Portuguese interests in order to break the link that existed between Portugal and Brazil within the framework of the United Kingdom.

This episode culminated, months later, in Brazil's declaration of independence, proclaimed on September 7 of the same year.

On the famous Dia do Fico, the Prince Regent, aged just 22, publicly defied the courts, which were pressuring him to return to Lisbon, and, by staying in Brazil, set off the whirlwind of events that would lead to the Grito do Ipiranga, eight months later. Even so, it is tempting to think: what would have been the fate of the country if Pedro had returned to Portugal?

— Laurentino Gomes, Aventuras na História Magazine, issue 89, December 2010
