= Obesity in Switzerland =

Health issue in Switzerland

Obesity in Switzerland has been increasingly cited as a major health issue in recent years, even though the country had the lowest rate of obesity in Europe in 2015. In 2017, 11.3% of the adult population had a body mass index (BMI) of 30 or more.

Compared to the rest of Europe and the Americas, average BMI (about 25) is fairly low and similar to that of many South American and African countries (see List of countries by body mass index).

Swiss women in particular are considered slimmer than other Europeans and have an average BMI close to that of China. In 2017, thirty-three per cent of Swiss women and fifty-one per cent of Swiss men were considered to be overweight (BMI ≥ 25).

== Causes and effects ==
The obesity level in men in the canton of Zurich is considered a contributing factor to the fact that only 54.1% of men there are deemed fit enough for military duty. Additionally inactivity has been blamed for the lack of physical fitness in men. Physical symptoms like back pain, obesity and asthma are reported as likely causes.

== See also ==
- Health in Switzerland
- Epidemiology of obesity
