= Anne Lévy (public health manager) =

Swiss public health manager

Anne Lévy (born May 24, 1971, in Bern) is a Swiss manager and Director-General of the Federal Office of Public Health (FOPH) in Switzerland since 2020.

== Career ==
Anne Lévy grew up in Bern. She moved to Basel at the age of 16, where her father Philippe Lévy became General Director of the Swiss Sample Fair in Basel. She graduated from high school, before completing her studies in political science at the University of Lausanne. She also holds an Executive MBA in Nonprofit Organization Management from the University of Fribourg.

Lévy has many years of experience in management and leadership and is also a specialist in the field of Public health. After completing her studies, Lévy worked as a specialist in drug issues for the city of Bern. In 2001, she took over the management of the Coordination and Service Platform for Addiction at the Federal Office of Public Health, followed by the management of the Addiction and Aids Unit from 2003 to 2004. She then headed the Alcohol and Tobacco Section at the Federal Office of Public Health until 2009. Finally, in 2009, she became Head of Health Protection at the Basel-Stadt Department of Health before becoming CEO of the University Psychiatric Clinics Basel in 2015. After five years in this position, the Federal Council appointed her as the new Director of the Federal Office of Public Health (FOPH). She took up this position on October 1, 2020.

Lévy has also worked as a lecturer: From 2015 to 2019, she was co-head of the health and social policy module and lecturer for health policy at the Zofingen Vocational and Continuing Education Program and the College of Podiatry. From 2008 to 2019, she was also a lecturer in the health policy module of the Master in Public Health at the Universities of Basel, Bern and Zurich.

Anne Lévy has held several honorary positions: from 2014 to 2019, she was President of the Foundation Board of Addiction Switzerland and a member of the Board of the New Israel Fund Switzerland. From 2014 to 2019, she was a trustee of the Goldschmidt Jacobson Foundation. At the same time, she was a member of the Board of OdA Santé beider Basel from 2017 to 2020. Lévy was also a board member of the Israelite Community Basel IGB from 2018 to 2020. Finally, from 2019 to 2020, she was a member of the Mental Health Subcommittee of the European Association of Hospital Managers EAHM and a board member and Vice President of the Association of Northwestern Swiss Hospitals VNS.

Lévy lives with her husband in Bern.
