= Association of Swiss Hemp Friends =

Swiss organization

The Association of Swiss Hemp Friends, better known as Verein Schweizer Hanf-freunde (VSFH) or ASAC, is an organization situated at St Gallen, Switzerland known for its activities towards legalization of free cultivation, consumption, personal, medicinal usage and commercial exchange of hemp unrelated to any narcotic usage. The organization is also known to advocate the farming of hemp plants by providing supports to the farmers and peasants as the efforts to make agricultural usage of hemp sustainable under prevailing governmental regulations about cannabis usage.

== History ==
The organization was formed in 1989 by Barbara Frei (also known as Baba Frei) at Winterthur. Barbara was the mother of two daughters and was imprisoned for personal cultivation and commercial exchange of hemp in her hemp shop. Her request to register the organization was initially refused at the registration office in Winterthur due to the common partisan viewpoint towards the cannabis usage. Baba's motto was to isolate and distance hemp from narcotic cannabis . During 1991, her friend and lawyer Jean-Pierre Egger registered the organization officially. She spent most of her life in prison and died at Swiss Prison Winterthur in 2002. The organization claims their declared objective as "Erhalt der freien Hanfnutzung im Rahmen der heutigen Gesetzgebung" ("Preservation of the free use of hemp within the framework of today's legislation").

== History of hemp cultivation in Switzerland ==
The Association of Swiss Hemp Friends aided farmers in industrially cultivating hemp which was used for medicinal purposes, sleeping pillows, calming tea, tobacco substitutes, for asthmatics, and in cosmetic products. During 1993 the organization helped to develop cultivation fields across 150 hectares (370 acres) of land with the collaboration of 200 farmers. During that time, other European states had restrictions imposed on hemp cultivation with THC content less than .3% but Switzerland lacked any such prohibitions. Though government and local administration took the matter seriously as apart from indigenous hemp cultivation, artificially grown Indian cannabis farming increased parallelly which had the potential use of producing marijuana. Jean-Pierre Egger, the president of the organization pleaded conspiracy as the organization was suspected to have associations in probable violations of the Narcotic Act. The police authority carried out a severe crackdown operation to fight the illicit cultivation and illegal commercial usage of artificially modified hemp plantations.

== CannaBioland case ==
In 1994, local farmer Armin Käser had started to plant hemp on the farm in Litzistorf near Bösingen, namely the Cannabis sativa variety. Initially the cultivation was carried out with the aid of Swiss Hemp Trading Company (SWIHTCO) which is the commercial wing of VSHF. In 1996 Jean-Pierre Egger, president of VSHF, together with Armin Käser, founded CannaBioland. The farming area of CannaBioland covered more than 2.5 hectares (6¼ acres). The controversy began as reports were found that the hemp produced by the company was used for smoking marijuana, violating the Narcotics Law. Investigation and legal proceedings commenced in 1996 based on the allegations. During 1996 authorities confiscated dried hemp herbs, hemp stalks and other hemp products such as tea, oil and pillows weighing around 55 kilograms (120 lb). During 1997, as the hemp cultivation at Litzistorf continued, the local authorities confiscated all hemp produce weighing more than 3.5 tons and Käser and Egger were charged with violation of the Narcotics act.

The judicial process continued for about 15 years as the charges for violation of Narcotics act could not be substantiated till the final verdict came where the farmer was sentenced to 21 months' conditional imprisonment in 2008. Egger was sentenced in December 2010 by the Freiburg cantonal court to a conditional imprisonment of eleven months and a fine of 1,000 francs for violating the Narcotics Act. Egger and the public prosecutor had taken the case to federal court, though In May 2011, the Federal Supreme Court upheld the judgment against Egger.

== Legal battle with Migros ==
In February 2000, VSHF lodged a complaint against Migros for using 'industrial grade' hemp seeds as the ingredient for preparing humanly edible organic bread. As per the complaint of VSHF, it was said, two low-THC content variant hemp French seeds, Fedora 19 and Felina 34, are "unsuitable hybrid seeds", so should not be used for preparation of organic bread. Agronomists and experts though said Fedora and Felina were used primarily for industrial purposes; however, this did not mean that they were unsuitable for use in food.

== Feeding hemp to livestock ==
The usage of hemp as cattle feed is still being considered as a potential option by researchers and scientists around the world, though nothing has been said conclusively to date. In Switzerland, usage of cannabis as cattle feed is not permitted legally. During 2007, advertisement campaigns by VSHF for using hemp as a cattle feed ignited controversy. Such unusual usage of hemp was perceived skeptically by the authorities and government. This resulted in lawsuits and such campaigns were condemned by the Thurgau Cantonal Court.

== Hemp to cease bee deaths ==
To fight the death of honey bees due to lack of flowers in odd seasons, hemp has been considered as a substitute in some experiments. VSHF carried out a test in Eastern Switzerland in 2009 and placed 24 honey bee colonies on hemp fields so as to feed them hemp syrup in absence of honey. The results of the experiment claimed only ten instead of fifty percent of the bees died in winter. Though no evidential disapproval was made by researchers and experts, the experiment and potential breakthrough received mixed skeptical reception.

== Bibliography ==
1. Annuaire suisse de la vie publique. Switzerland: Schwabe., 2004.
2. Publicus: Schweizer Jahrbuch des öffentlichen Lebens. Switzerland: Schwabe, 2002.
3. Lerch, Fredi. Der Leergeglaubte Staat: Kulturboykott : gegen die 700-Jahr-Feier der Schweiz : Dokumentation einer Debatte. Switzerland: Rotpunktverlag, 1991. ISBN 9-783858691514

== Footnotes ==
- Praxisversuche 2010 mit Löschkalk und Hanfextrakt gegen Feuerbrand, HJ. Schärer, A. Häseli, C. Daniel, J. Fuchs, L. Tamm November 2010, Das FiBL hat Standorte in der Schweiz, Deutschland und Österreich.

== See also ==
- The Legalize it! Association
- Hemp Industries Association
- List of cannabis rights leaders
- Society of Cannabis Clinicians
- American Medical Marijuana Association
- European Industrial Hemp Association
