= Health in Switzerland =

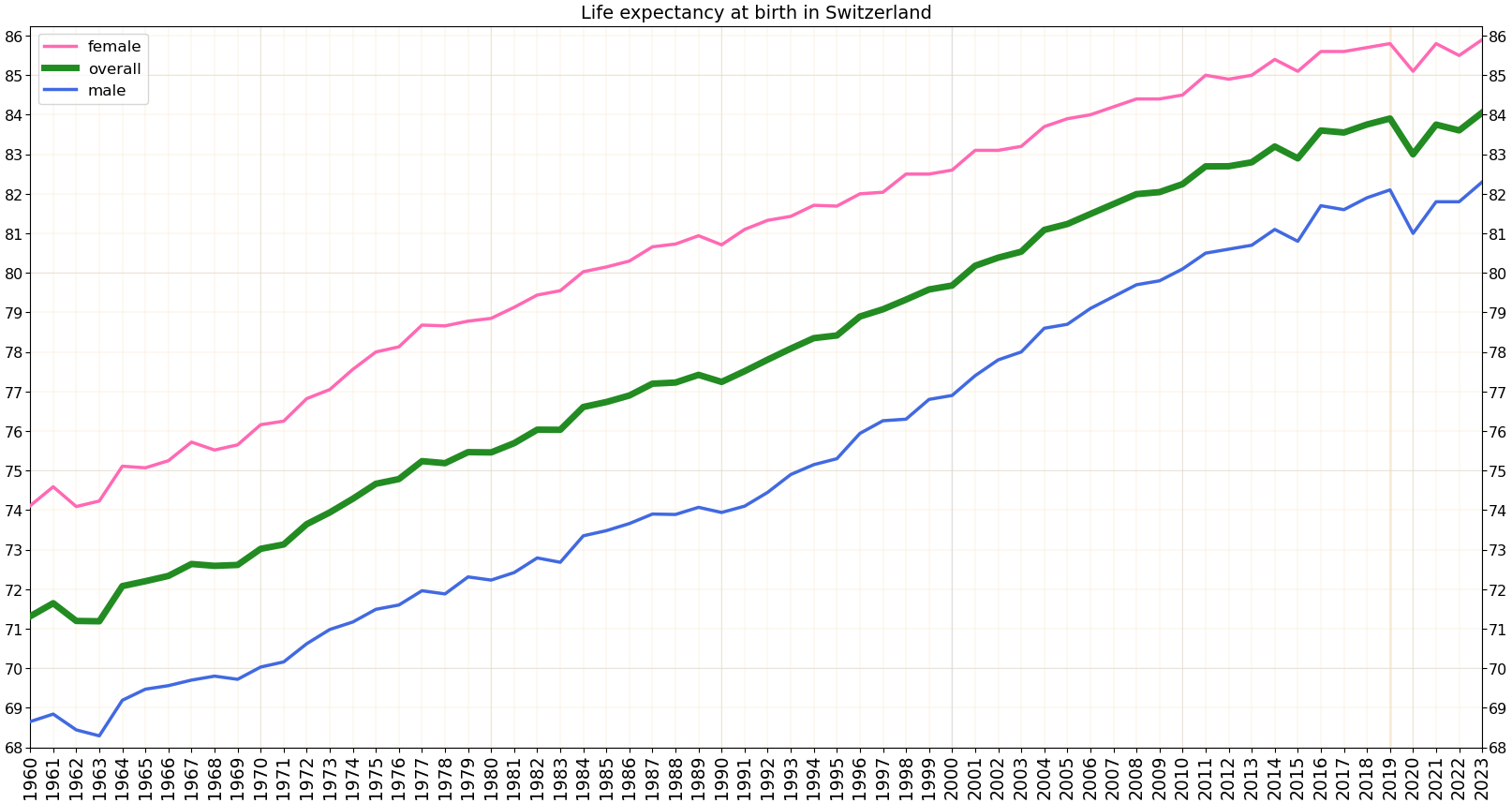
Life expectancy at birth in Switzerland

Health in Switzerland relates to a variety of issues: water and sanitation, diet and fitness, various addictions, mental fitness, communicable diseases, hygiene and the environment.

In the 2023 OECD "Health at a Glance" report, Switzerland's health statistics indicate several positive features relative to the OECD averages:

- The country records a life expectancy of 83.9 years, which is 3.6 years higher than the OECD average.
- Its preventable mortality rate is 94 per 100,000 people, which is below the OECD average of 158 per 100,000.
- The treatable mortality rate in Switzerland, at 39 per 100,000, is also below the OECD average of 79 per 100,000.
- Additionally, 3.9% of the Swiss population reports their health as bad or very bad, less than the OECD average of 7.9%.
- The prevalence of diabetes in Switzerland is lower than the OECD average.

Overall, Switzerland performs better than the OECD benchmarks on 95% of the health indicators analyzed.

A new measure of expected human capital was published by The Lancet in September 2018. This was calculated for 195 countries from 1990 to 2016, and defined, for each birth cohort, as the expected years lived from age 20 to 64 years, adjusted for educational attainment, learning or education quality, and functional health status.

Switzerland had the twelfth highest level of expected human capital with 25 health, education, and learning-adjusted expected years lived between age 20 and 64 years.

According to a study conducted by Swiss insurance company CSS in 2023, about one third of the Swiss "feel unhealthy or ill".

== Risk factors ==
In 2023, Switzerland exhibits a smoking prevalence of 19.1%, higher than the OECD average of 16.0%. The country's alcohol consumption per capita is closely aligned with the OECD average, at 8.5 litres compared to the OECD's 8.6 litres. Obesity prevalence in Switzerland is notably lower, at 11.3%, compared to the OECD average of 18.4%. Moreover, Switzerland reports fewer deaths from air pollution, with 16 deaths per 100,000 population, versus the OECD average of 28.9. Overall, Switzerland performs better than the OECD average in 90% of the health risk factors reviewed.

== Health system resources ==
In 2023, Switzerland's health system investment considerably exceeded OECD averages, with a per capita expenditure of $8049, significantly higher than the OECD's average of $4986 (USD PPP). This expenditure accounted for 11.3% of Switzerland's GDP, compared to the OECD average of 9.2%. The country also has a higher density of healthcare professionals, with 4.4 practising doctors and 18.4 practising nurses per 1,000 population, above the OECD averages of 3.7 and 9.2, respectively. Switzerland's hospital bed capacity stands at 4.4 per 1,000 population, on par with the OECD average of 4.3. Switzerland performs better than the OECD standard in 55% of assessed health indicators.

The Swiss hospital system, which is decentralized and regulated by the cantons, comprised 275 establishments in 2023, with a total of 37,926 beds.

72% of healthcare costs in Switzerland (CHF 92.7 billion as of 2022) are related to non-communicable diseases. Theses diseases include dementia (10.8%); cardiovascular diseases (10.4%) such as hypertension and stroke; psychiatric diseases (10.4%) such as depression; locomotion diseases (10%), for example back pain; and cancers (6.9%). Productivity loss related to these same diseases are estimated at CHF 109 billion, which represents about 14% of GDP.

== Absenteeism ==
More than 100,000 people call in sick each day in Switzerland, and related productivity loss is estimated at CHF 70 billion per year (9% of GDP); with back pain or depression being the most frequent causes (colds and flu represent only 20% of cases).

== Mental health ==
It has been estimated that one out of six persons in Switzerland suffers from mental illness. Other studies estimate that between 20 and 30 per cent of the population suffers from clinical psychological disorders. The annual cost of brain disorders is CHF 15 billion ($13.7 billion) — more than CHF2,000 per person — according to Swiss medical sources (2008).

Switzerland has the highest ratio of psychiatrists to population in the OECD (Iceland has half as many psychiatrists as in Switzerland and is ranked second).

According to study, people working in healthcare and hospitality industries are two economic sectors most affected by mental illness.

Patients in psychiatric clinics can be subjected to medication against their will, isolation and restraint. One in four patients in psychiatric services is now hospitalized against their will. "This figure is surprisingly high compared to other European countries" according to Swiss sources.

The percentage of SMEs that are significantly affected by failures due to mental illnesses in 2022 stands at 26%.

According to the government, mental illness amongst young people has "exploded" in recent years, overloading the disability insurance system (2026). In 2025, 61,000 people were enrolled in vocational rehabilitation programs, costing taxpayers CHF 979 million. In addition, 37,000 people received daily disability allowances totalling CHF 780 million. In 2025, mental health remained the leading cause of disability, comprising 55% of cases (64% of cases among adolescents and young adults), followed by diseases of the bones and musculoskeletal system (14%), congenital disabilities (12%) and accidents (8%). According to the Federal Social Insurance Office (FSIO), an attempt at rehabilitation always precedes the payment of a pension.

=== Happiness, confidence ===
According to a 2025-survey conducted by YouGov, retirees in Switzerland are among the “happiest” in Europe.

According to a-2026 survey by the OECD, some 80% of the Swiss look into the future “with confidence”.

=== Stress ===
Studies reveal that over 27% of Swiss workers are stressed, and nearly 30% of Swiss people say that they are "emotionally exhausted". Health Promotion Switzerland says that job-related stress results in a loss of productivity worth about $6.6 billion per year or 1% of Switzerland's GDP.

Apprentices have been reported as having a high level of stress, with 92.4% experiencing stress at work, 53.2% of them often or all the time.

=== Anxiety ===
The most common psychiatric illnesses are anxiety disorders with 710,000 cases (2008)

=== Migraine ===
Migraine cases as part of "neurological illnesses" stand at 630,000 cases (2008).

=== Depression ===
Around 345,000 people saw a doctor about depression in 2008.

=== Bipolar ===
As of 2022, about 80,000 people were diagnosed with bipolar disorder.

=== Schizophrenia ===
As of 2021, nearly 85,000 people in Switzerland were suffering from schizophrenia.

=== Sleeping disorders ===
52% of the Swiss say they have problem sleeping (2022). Insomnia affects migrants twice as often.

=== Alzheimer ===
About 150,000 people have Alzheimer in Switzerland (2022). This number is predicted to increase to 315,000 by 2050.

=== Hyperacusis ===
Some 12% of the population is suffering from hyperacusis.

== Cancer ==
Some 23,100 men and 19,650 women were diagnosed with cancer every year between 2013 and 2017, according to a Swiss report; with an increase of 3,350 new cases compared with the previous five-year period (because of an aging population). According to studies, alcohol consumption, smoking and pollution are main factors contributing to cancer. Other contributing factors relate to lifestyle, pollution, diet and the environment. According to the WHO, one in eight cancers is due to infection, some of which can be prevented through vaccination.

== Addictions ==
A study published in 2021 estimated the economic costs of addiction in Switzerland at approximately 8 billion francs per year. Every year in Switzerland, more than 10,000 people die as a result of substance use, and tens of thousands of individuals are trapped in the cycle of addiction.

=== Internet ===
On average in 2019, 16–25 years olds spend 4 hours on the internet every day. Between 73,000 and 290,000 people in Switzerland had "problematic" time usage of the internet.

=== Gambling ===
Nearly 3% of people in Switzerland gamble excessively spending 122 Swiss Francs per month on average (2020). Over 70 thousand persons were banned from Swiss casinos for excessive gambling in 2020. But according to Addiction Switzerland in 2026, approximately 7% of young adults gamble excessively.

=== Illegal drugs ===
As of 2017, out of a population of 8 million, Swiss people smoke more than half a million joints per day. The Swiss health office estimates there are 220,000 regular consumers of cannabis in Switzerland despite a legal ban.

Drug use is 14% of men and 6.5% of women between 20 and 24 saying they had consumed cannabis in the past 30 days, and 5 Swiss cities were listed among the top 10 European cities for cocaine use as measured in wastewater (2018). Since the early 90's, when drug use was dramatically increasing in urban areas, Switzerland has pioneered effective drug policies of harm reduction, prevention and treatment, including HAT as well as decriminalisation of recreational cannabis use. With the revision of Swiss federal narcotics regulations in 2008, the medical use of cannabis was also legalised.

The number of opioid-related calls made to Tox Info Suisse, the national poisoning hotline, increased by 177% between 2000 and 2019. During the same period, sales of opioids almost doubled, from 14,300 units sold per 100,000 inhabitants to 27,400, with Fentanyl being the third most sold opioid in Switzerland.

Analysis of Swiss police records suggests that participants in medical drug rehabilitation programs tend to reduce cocaine, cannabis and heroin use, and the need to commit other crimes to buy their drugs, such as shoplifting, burglary or car theft.

According to FedPol (Swiss police) in 2025, Swiss consumption of cocaine has "doubled over the past 10 years". Most affected economic sectors by cocaine usage are the restaurant industry, the building sector, and the arts and entertainment sector.

=== Legal pills ===
An estimated 350,000 people in Switzerland are addicted to sleeping pills. As of a 2022 study, a quarter of the Swiss use painkillers. Overall, the study found that 55% of the Swiss respondents had taken medication in the last week.

=== Alcoholism ===
According to official statistics, the percentage of adults drinking alcohol every day has decreased by 50% over the past 25 years, from 20% to 11%. Overall, 82% of the population regularly drinks alcoholic beverages. In 2016, Swiss hospitals treated 11,500 people for alcohol poisoning; about half of the patients were diagnosed as alcoholics. Among those who seek help to quit drinking, the average age is 46; 70% are male. Sixteen percent of the population exhibits consumption that poses a medium or high risk to health.

As of 2025, the Swiss Federal Commission on Alcohol-Related Problems recommends that men consume no more than two alcoholic drinks per day, compared to one for women. However, the World Health Organization (WHO) now believes that alcohol consumption is never safe for health, regardless of the quantity.

In 2026, Swiss President Guy Parmelin (himself a winemaker by trade) has stirred controversy by saying that people should “drink more” in response to the decrease in wine consumption in Switzerland.

=== Smoking ===
Between 2008 and 2018, the percentage of smokers has remained stable at around 27%; which is significantly above the European average. Despite its harmful health effects, including cancer, Switzerland has not ratified the global convention on tobacco control because of strong pro-tobacco lobbies in the country (2025).

== Communicable diseases ==
=== HIV/AIDS ===
By the end of 2020, Switzerland had 236 registered HIV new infections (about a third fewer than in 2019, partly because of the COVID-19 pandemic). In 2018, 17,000 people were infected with HIV/AIDS according to official statistics.

=== Gonorrhea ===
Switzerland had 4,000 cases of gonorrhea in 2021.

=== Chlamydia ===
In 2021, Switzerland had 12,000 cases of chlamydia which is a sexually transmissible disease.

== Environmental issues related to health ==
=== Chemicals ===
- Lead poisoning
- PFAS pollutants have been found in 134 sites in Switzerland (2023).

==== Carcinogens ====
- Asbestos:
- Glyphosate:
- Dioxins: High levels of dioxin have been detected in Lausanne in 2021.

=== Air pollution and nanoparticles ===
As of 2023, Switzerland does not meet the World Health Organization standard for air quality. Ozone and ammonia levels are reportedly too high in the region of Fribourg (2025).

=== Soil contamination ===
In Switzerland, there are officially 38,000 polluted sites, 4,000 of which represent a real threat to groundwater.

=== Radiation ===
According to official study, 5G is not harmful to health. Critics say the study was not conducted in "realistic" conditions however.

In 2023, low-level radioactive were found in a landfill in Solothurn.

== Water and sanitation ==
As of 2017, drinking water in over a third of Switzerland’s cantons contains above-recommended levels of the banned pesticide chlorothalonil.

== Nutrition and obesity ==
As of 2017, the proportion of people classified as overweight (body mass index (BMI) 25 to 30) has remained stable at 42% of the population. However, over the last 25 years, the percentage of obese people (BMI>30) has more than doubled, from 5% in 1992 to 11% in 2017. As of 2026, 20% of the children in Switzerland suffer from overweight or obesity.

In 2021, approximately 35% of food samples analyzed in Switzerland contained residues of banned pesticides, according to a Public Eye investigation based on figures from the Federal Food Safety and Veterinary Office (FSVO).

=== Food packaging ===
According to study, 87% of food and beverage packagings is not properly regulated and can have adverse effect on health in some cases (e.g. plastics).

=== Vegetarian, vegan food ===
According to Swissveg in 2022, Switzerland counted 304,000 vegetarians, while 42,000 people (0.6% of the 8.7 million population) ate vegan. Overall, this is 5% of the Swiss population aged 14 and over, and the trend is said to be increasing.

== Sports and fitness ==
Since 2002 until 2018, the number of people who are physically active has increased from 62% to 76%. Swiss people are among the most physically active in Europe. The favorite sports of the Swiss remain hiking (practiced by 49% of the population), cycling (34%), swimming (25%), skiing (23%), and jogging (23%). However, these have lost popularity in recent years to weight training (20%) and yoga (16%).

Switzerland records some 62,000 accidents from skiing or snowboarding each year on average. Between 2018 and 2022, there were 26,100 cycling accidents.

== Hypertension ==
Hypertension is cited as one the first cause of death in Switzerland. According to the Swiss Heart Foundation, approximately one in five people in Switzerland suffers from high blood pressure, and among those over the age of 65, it is as many as 50%; citing practicing sports or regular physical activity (such as walking) as the best remedies.

== Major causes of death ==
Between 2013 and 2017, around 9,400 Swiss men and 7,650 women died from cancer every year. This means that around 30% of all male deaths and 23% of all female deaths were due to cancer. Over the past four decades, the number of suicides per 100,000 residents has dropped from 24.9 to 9.5 (2022).

Top causes of deaths per 100 000 population. Switzerland, 2021
Cause	Rate
Ischaemic heart disease	110.5
Alzheimer's disease and other dementias	73.9
COVID-19	73.5
Stroke	44.5
Trachea, bronchus, lung cancers	40
Hypertensive heart disease	30.1
Chronic obstructive pulmonary disease	27
Falls	21.3
Colon and rectum cancers	20.8
Pancreas cancer	19.4

== Family planning ==
Abortions in Switzerland hit a record high with 12,045 cases reported in 2023; or 7.3 per 1,000 women. 95% of abortions happened during the first 12 weeks of pregnancy (80% by medication, 19% by surgery). 53% of abortions were for women over 30.

== See also ==
- Healthcare in Switzerland
- Obesity in Switzerland
