= Swissmedic =

Medicine licensing and inspection authority in Switzerland

Coordinates: 46.9523°N 7.4355°E

Logo of Swissmedic

The Swiss Agency for Therapeutic Products (Swissmedic) is the Swiss surveillance authority for medicines and medical devices, registered in Bern. It began operations on 1 January 2002 as successor of Interkantonale Kontrollstelle für Heilmittel (IKS), which was itself the successor of Schweizerische Arzneimittelnebenwirkungszentrale (SANZ). Swissmedic is affiliated to the Federal Department of Home Affairs.

== Structure ==
Swissmedic is a federal institution subject to public law and was created by the Federal Act on Medicinal Products and Medical Devices. It is independent in organization and management and has authority over its own budget. Swissmedic has 300 full-time employees.

== Functions ==
Any medical products for humans or animals need approval from Swissmedic to be brought on the Swiss market. Moreover, Swissmedic must be notified of all clinical studies conducted in Switzerland.

When authorising new medicinal products, Swissmedic bases its decisions on internationally acknowledged criteria. The products may only be placed on the market if their quality, safety and effectiveness are sufficiently evaluated and proved. If the criteria for authorisation are fulfilled, Swissmedic grants the marketing authorisation, specifies the method of sale (on prescription only/dispensing point) and approves the information for healthcare professionals and the patient information.

Costs of approval are paid by the applicant. Approval must be renewed after five years.
