= Federal Office of Public Health =

Swiss governmental agency

Coordinates: 46°55′47″N 7°25′18″E

- (in German) Bundesamt für Gesundheit (in French) Office fédéral de la santé publique (in Italian) Ufficio federale della sanità pubblica (in Romansh) Uffizi federal da sanadad publica

Agency overview
- Jurisdiction: Federal administration of Switzerland
- Headquarters: Liebefeld
- Minister responsible: Elisabeth Baume-Schneider, Federal Councillor
- Agency executive: Anne Lévy, Director of the office
- Parent agency: Federal Department of Home Affairs
- Website: https://www.bag.admin.ch

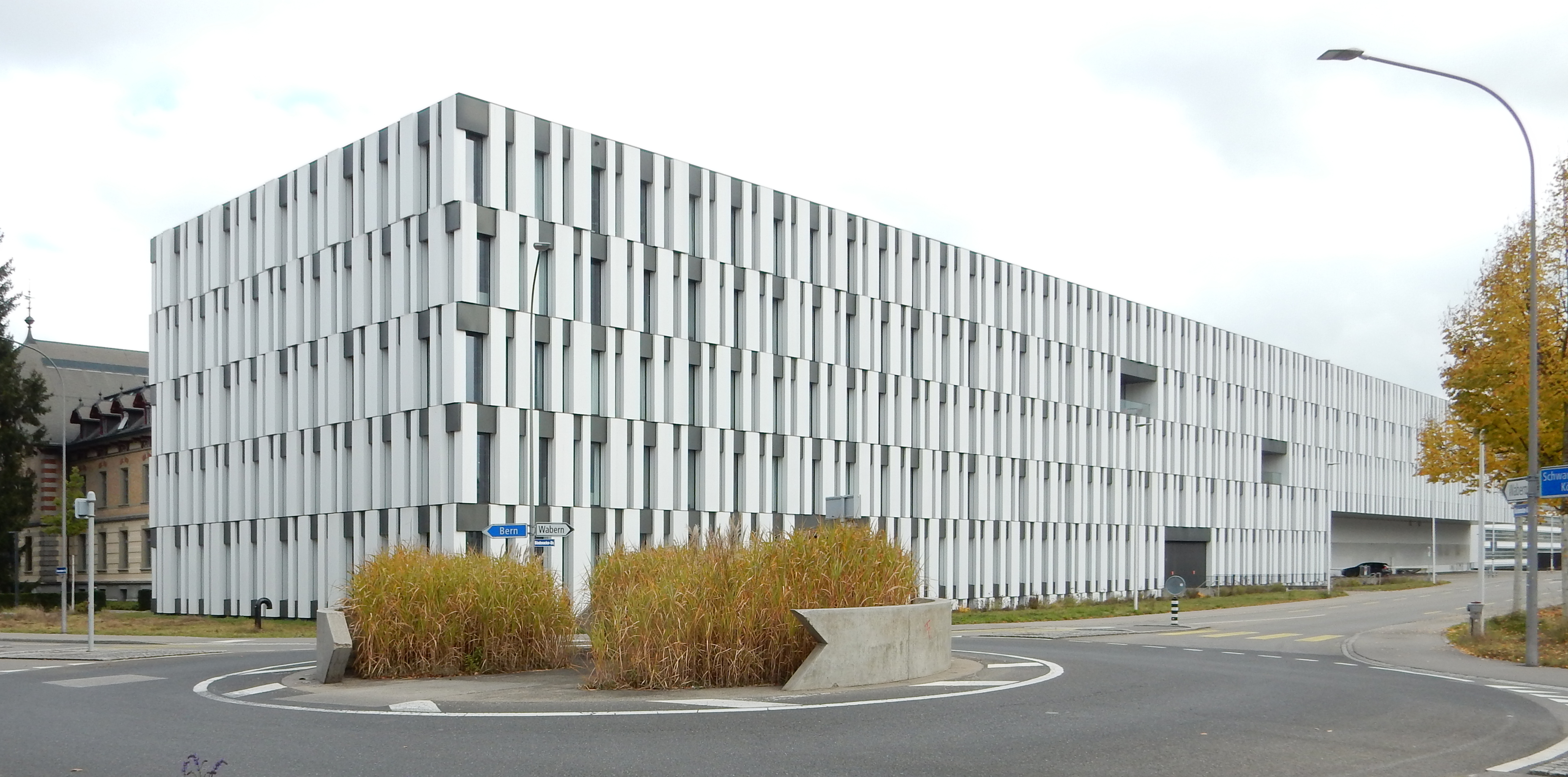
The building of the Federal Office of Public Health in Liebefeld

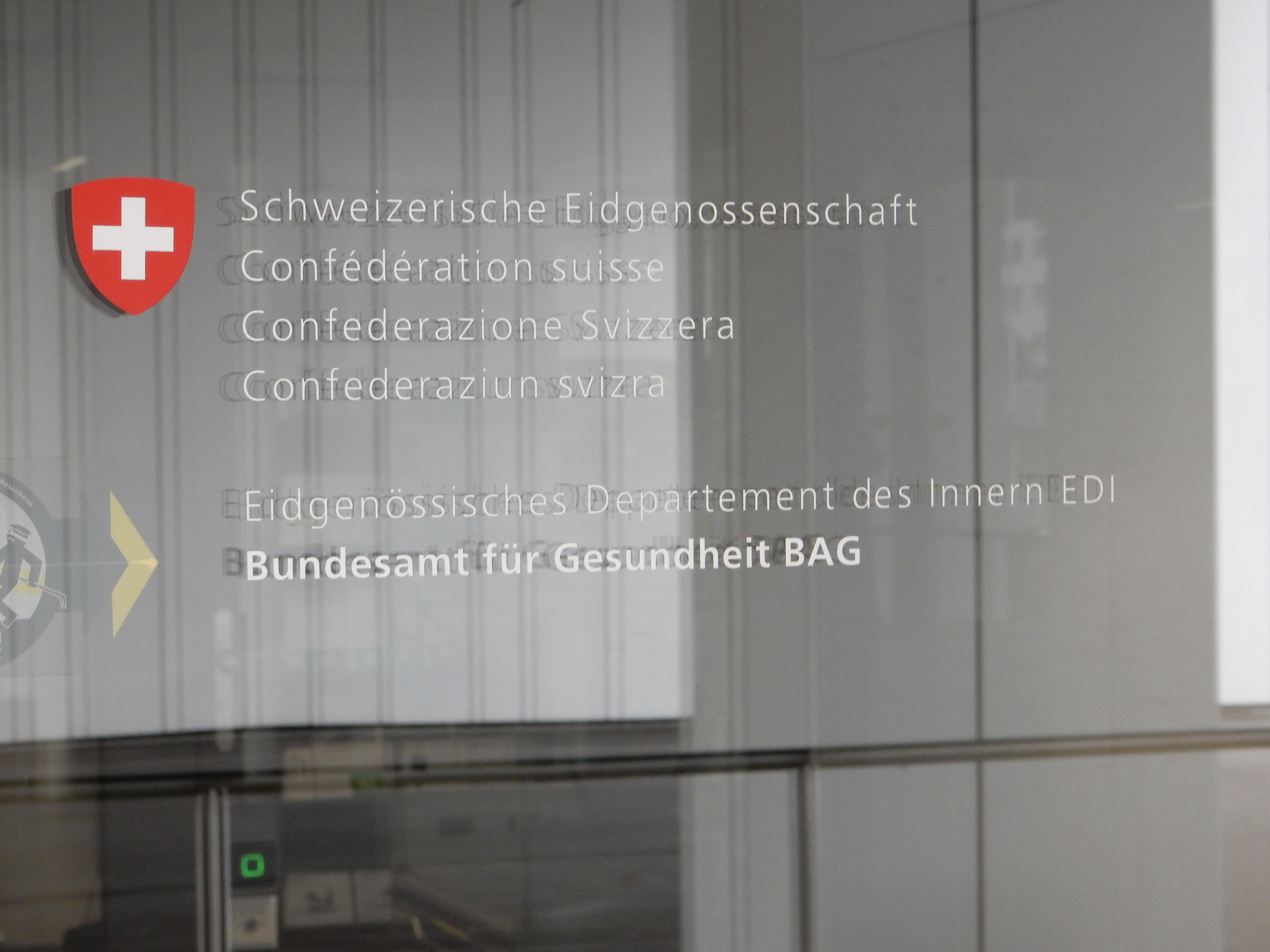
Entrance

The Federal Office of Public Health (FOPH) (Note: German: Bundesamt für Gesundheit, French: Office fédéral de la santé publique, Italian: Ufficio federale della sanità pubblica, Romansh: Uffizi federal da sanadad publica) is the Swiss federal government's centre for public health and a part of the Swiss Federal Department of Home Affairs.

In addition to developing national health policy, it also represents the interests of its country within international health organizations such as the OECD or the World Health Organization. As of December 2014, FOPH employs 544 persons (443 full-time job equivalents). The 2015 budget was 193 million Swiss francs.

== Directorates, divisions and units ==
The Federal Office of Public Health is headed by its director Anne Lévy. The organisation is as follows:

- Health and Accident Insurance Directorate:
  - Health Care Services Division
  - Insurance Supervision Division
  - Health Policy Directorate
  - Healthcare Professions Division
  - Health Strategies Division
  - Tobacco Prevention Fund
  - Evaluation and Research Service
- Public Health Directorate:
  - National Prevention Programmes Division
  - Communicable Diseases Division
  - Biomedicine Division
- Consumer Protection Directorate:
  - Radiation Protection Division
  - Chemical Products Division
  - Notification Authority for chemicals
- Communication and Campaigns Division
- Management Services Division
- International Affairs Division
- Legal Affairs Division
- Resource Management Division

== Full-time positions since 2001 ==
Raw data

"Federal Finance Administration FFA: State financial statements".
"Federal Finance Administration FFA: Data portal".

== See also ==
- Alcohol Act (Switzerland)
- COVID-19 pandemic in Switzerland
- Epidemics Act
- Tobacco legislation in Switzerland
