= Liberal-Radical Party =

Liberal-Radical Party Partido Liberal-Radical
- Founded: 1822
- Dissolved: 1831
- Succeeded by: Exalted Liberal Party
- Ideology: Parliamentarism; Abolitionism; Economic liberalism
- Political position: Centre-left

The Liberal-Radical Party (Portuguese: Partido Liberal-Radical) was a Brazilian political party during the United Kingdom of Portugal, Brazil and Algarves and the imperial time.

== History ==
The liberal radicals were a political group formed during the regency of D. Pedro I. With the return of D. John VI to Portugal, the Cortes wished to recolonize Brazil, avoid the intervention of the British in the economy and abolish the administrative autonomy acquired by Brazil. When the news of the recolonization arrived in Brazil, the present forces divided themselves into three parties: the Brazilian Party and the Portuguese Party, both composed by the elite, and a third group composed by the middle-class of Rio de Janeiro, the Liberal Radicals.
