= Sandow =

Sandow is a German and Jewish (western Ashkenazic) family name. It is a variant of Sandau, which is a habitational name from a place near Stendal called Sandau. The Swedish bearers of the name are probably of German origin. It may refer to:

Surname

- Sandow (surname)

Given name or nickname

- Sandow Birk, American visual artist
- Sandow Nasution (born 1981), Indonesian weightlifter
- Dan "Sandow" O'Donovan (1890–1975), member of the Irish Republican Army
- Sandy Ruby (1941–2008), born Sandow Sacks Ruby, American mathematician and entrepreneur
- Sandow M. M. A. Chinnappa Thevar, Indian film producer

Other

- Sandow (film), an 1894 silent film featuring Eugen Sandow
- Sandow (apple), an apple cultivar
- Sandow's Magazine of Physical Culture, a bodybuilding magazine established by Eugen Sandow in 1898
- Mount Sandow, a nunatak near Mount Amundsen in Antarctica
- Sandow Lakes Ranch, a ranch in Texas, USA.
- Sandow Power Plant, a coal-fired power plant near Rockdale, Texas
- Sandow, Chiktan, a village in Jammu and Kashmir, India

== See also ==
- Rockdale, Sandow and Southern Railroad
- Sandoz (disambiguation)
