= Sandoz (disambiguation) =

Sandoz is a Swiss pharmaceutical company, formerly a division of Novartis.

Sandoz may also refer to:

- Abbott v. Sandoz, US patent law case
- Sandoz (band), a recording alias of musician Richard H. Kirk
- Sandoz (surname)
- Sandoz (watch company), a Swiss watch brand established by Henri Sandoz
- Sandoz Family Foundation, a private Swiss foundation

== Other ==
- "A Girl Named Sandoz" (1967), the B-side of the single "When I Was Young" by Eric Burdon and The Animals
- "Sandoz in the Rain" (1970), a song by Amon Düül II from their album Yeti
