= Arthur Schlageter =

Swiss sculptor and painter

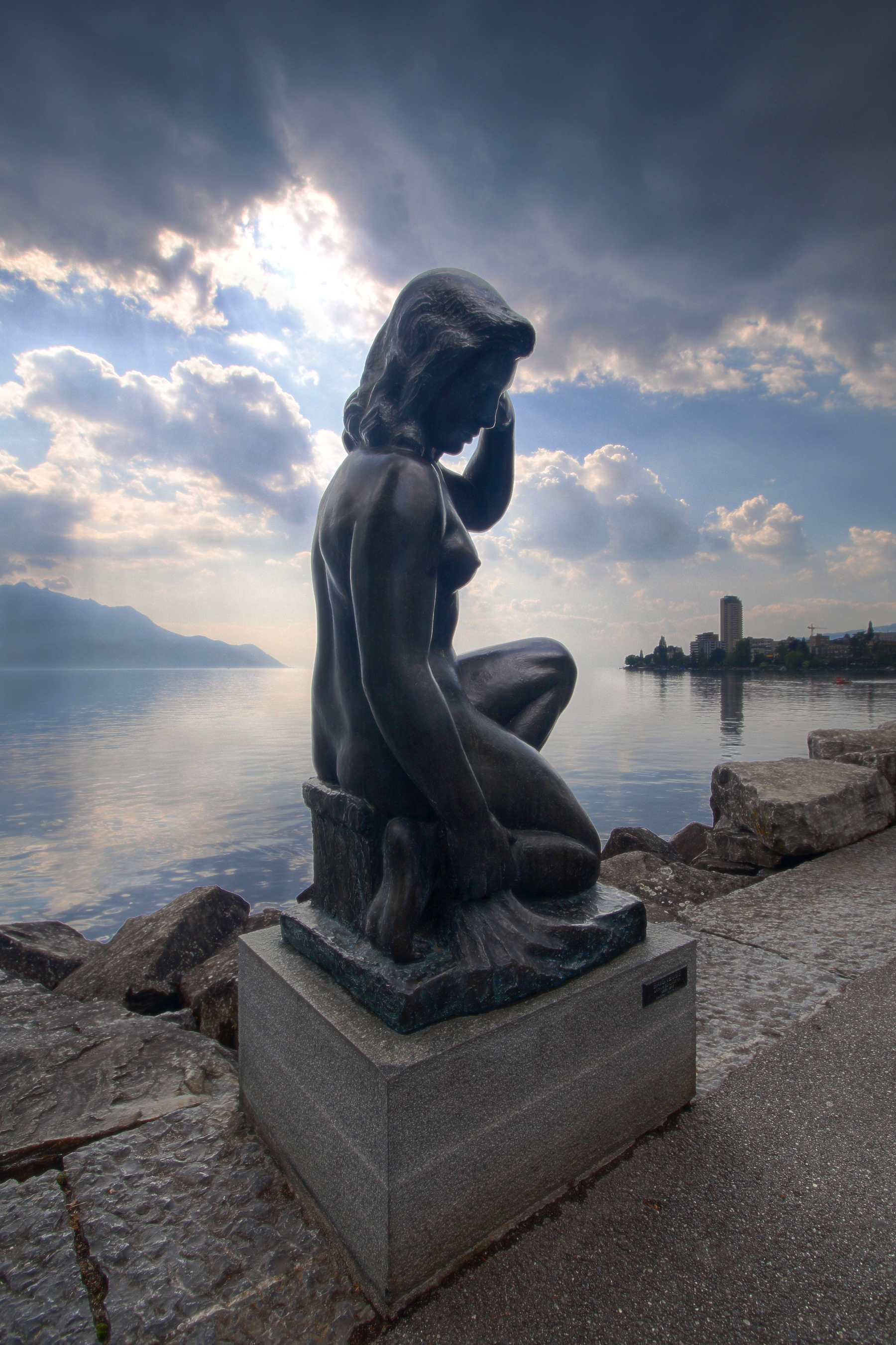
- Lady of the Lake
- Born: Arthur Schlageter; 11 December 1883; Clarens, Switzerland
- Died: 30 October 1963 (aged 79); Lausanne, Switzerland
- Resting place: Bois-de-Vaux Cemetery
- Known for: Painting, drawing, sculpture

Arthur Schlageter (11 December 1883 – 30 October 1963) was a Swiss sculptor and painter.

== Early life ==
Arthur Schlageter was born on December 11, 1883, in Clarens, Montreux, where his parents were horticulturalists. He was the second son in a family of five girls and three boys. Schlageter developed a passion for stonecraft at a very young age and produced his first sculpture when he was 14, a faun carved in stone.

== Career ==
=== Early career ===
After finishing school, young Schlageter, following his growing passion in the arts, practiced stone carving at Rossier, a marble maker in Vevey. He then became a student of the Ecole des Beaux-Arts in Geneva at the same time as Edouard-Marcel Sandoz. In several occasions, Sandoz would ask his fellow sculptor and friend Schlageter, to add his signature to Sandoz's commissioned sculptures, such as the winged Bull from the Church of Saint Luke to the Pontaise in Lausanne.

Recipient of a Swiss federal scholarship in 1903, Schlageter made several study trips to Paris, Rome, Florence, and Munich. He participated in the creation of monumental works: the facade of the City Hall of Roubaix, the pediment of the Denain Theatre, then that of the Geneva Museum of Art and History. It was in this city that, full of hope, he opened his own sculpture workshop around 1912. He got married that same year.

=== As a struggling artist ===
Happy times were short-lived as World War I broke out and Schlageter was mobilized. Life in Geneva, a large city in a small canton, proved to be complicated, especially for finding resources. As an artist, he did not receive regular commissions, a steady income, nor unemployment insurance. Returning home, Schlageter had to then face his responsibilities. Unable to simultaneously pay for rent and a workshop, he was sued and forced to abandon his workshop, his essential place of income. At that time, artists had to entirely professional, living wholly on the income their art could provide, in order to be a member of the SPSAS (Society of Swiss Painters, Sculptors and Architects), and it was nearly impossible to take part in competitions or participate in national exhibitions without being part of this society.

The armistice did not provide a solution to the difficulties faced by young artists: to survive, many had to accept auxiliary work. They would at times be executors, partners, or collaborators of other sculptors. It was the same for Schlageter who, alongside these types of work, pursued his own personal creations on the side. As a member of the SPSAS since 1911, he participated in several collective exhibitions, locally and nationally.

=== Success and legacy ===
From the thirties, the arts took off again. For Schlageter, the situation improved: he began to be known in Lausanne and in the Canton of Vaud, from which he received commissions. It was then that he created a whole series of works whose main themes were the beauty of women and of youth: Flore (garden of Brillancourt), Femme à l’avion (Rongimel square), l'Offrande (promenade of Derrière-Bourg), Diane et la Biche (ESC), bas-reliefs for the colleges of Montoie, Bellevaux, Croix-d'Ouchy and Pully. Through the years, other public sculptures were created: La Baigneuse I, Montreux quay, La Baigneuse II, Territet quay, La Baigneuse III, Musée de l'Hermitage parc, Lausanne and La Source, parc at Les Bains de Lavey.

In December 1984, in an article recounting the tribute to Schlageter by the Cantonal Museum of Fine Arts in Lausanne, J-P Chuard, director of training for journalists, wrote:

"Schlageter’s work is important, above all he carved many sculptures directly on stone which bear witness to his obstinate search for sobriety and the beauty of form. "

Schlageter also left behind many drawings, portraits, and paintings.

== Exhibitions ==
Individual exhibitions and collective participations

- 1909, Zurich: Invited by the cantonal section of the SPSAS
- 1922, Vevey: Jenisch Museum
- 1924, Lausanne: First individual exhibition at the Galeries Saint-François
- 1925, Hamburg: Salon des Indépendants
- 1928, Bern & Zurich: Kunsthaus
- 1936, Geneva: Museum of Art and History
- 1980, Lausanne: SVBA, Homage to Arthur Schlageter
