= Sandoz (surname) =

Sandoz is a surname of Arpitan origin. Like many Arpitan anthroponyms, the final -z only marks paroxytonic stress and should not be pronounced. Nevertheless, it is often pronounced in French through hypercorrection. Notable people with the surname include:

- Claude Sandoz (born 1946), Swiss visual artist
- Daniel Sandoz (born 1961), Swiss cross-country skier
- Edmond Sandoz (1872–1943), French sports shooter
- Édouard-Marcel Sandoz (1881–1971), Swiss sculptor and painter
- Ellis Sandoz (1931–2023), American political scientist
- Helen Sandoz (1920–1987), American lesbian rights activist and writer
- Jean-Luc Sandoz (born 1960), French-Swiss engineer and expert in wood construction
- Lore Sandoz-Peter (1899–1989), Swiss business executive
- Luis Calvet Sandoz (1888–1936), Spanish sport shooter
- Mari Sandoz (1896–1966), American novelist
- Suzette Sandoz (born 1942), Swiss politician and professor of law
