= Paul Strebel =

Swiss business school professor, author and consultant

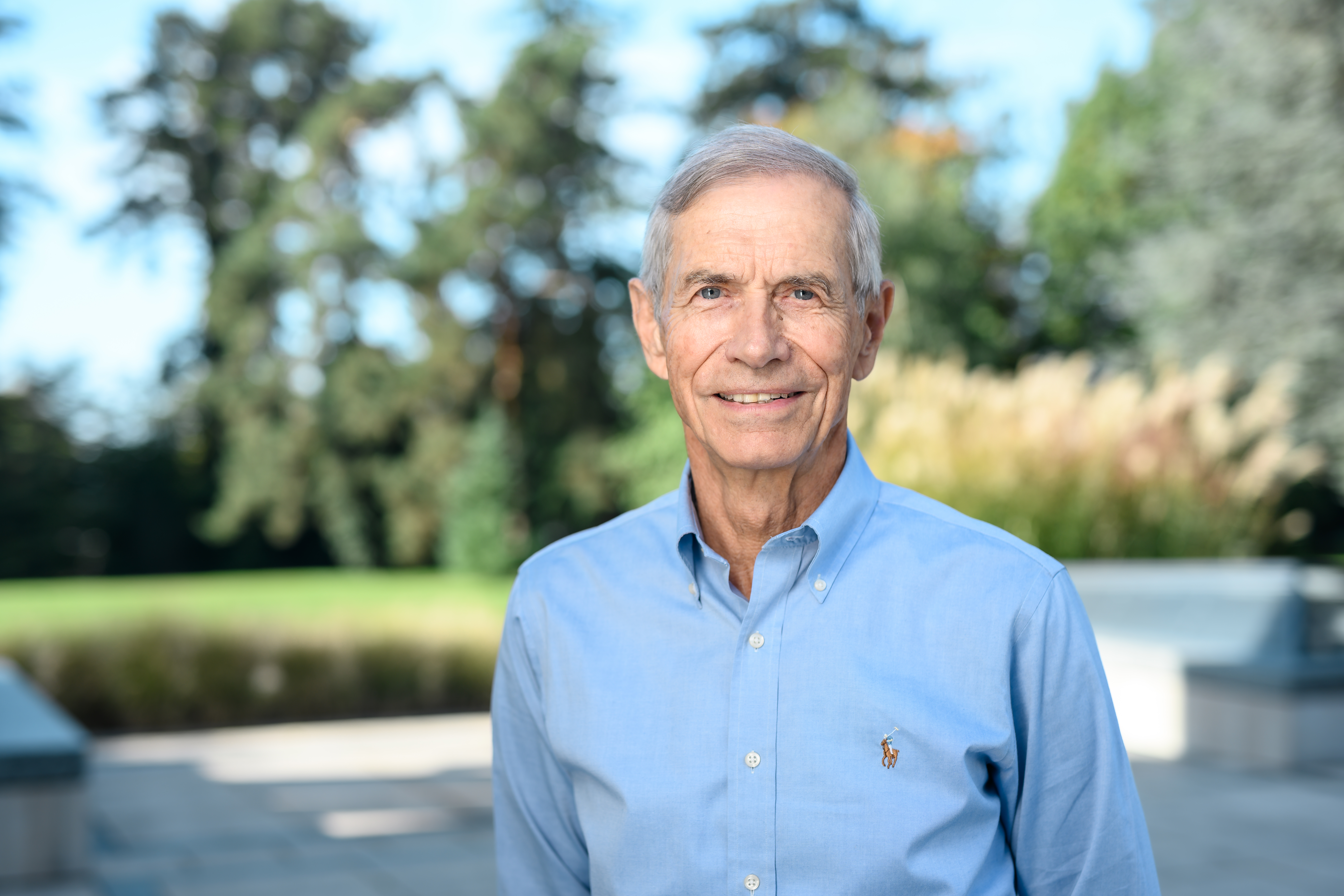

Paul J. Strebel is a Swiss business school professor, author and consultant. He is Professor Emeritus of Strategy and Governance at International Institute for Management Development (IMD) in Lausanne Switzerland.

== Education ==
Strebel received a Master of Business Administration from Columbia University, a Master of Science from the University of Cape Town, and a Doctor of Philosophy from Princeton University.

== Career ==
While working in the Finance Department of W.R. Grace & Co. first in New York City and then in Lausanne, he was invited to join the Graduate School of Business at the University of the Witwatersrand in Johannesburg as Senior Lecturer in Finance and subsequently Director of the MBA Program.

When the Soweto riots and subsequent police crackdown occurred in South Africa, he moved to the State University of New York in Binghamton where he became Associate Professor with tenure in 1983 and Chair of the Finance and Economics Group.

After joining IMEDE in Lausanne, one of the two management development institutes that later merged to form IMD, he became the first Director of Research and held the Sandoz Family Foundation Chair in Strategic Change Management.

Strebel has received Research on Leadership Award from the Association of Executive Search Consultants in 1998 and 2004, and the European Case Award from the European Foundation for Management Development in 1994, 1996, and 2000. He has published numerous articles in academic and practitioner journals, such as MIT Sloan Management Review, Harvard Business Review, California Management Review, Strategic Management Journal, and Long Range Planning.

== Research work ==
Strebel is the originator of several managerial frameworks, including:

Outpacing Strategy

Outpacing Strategy (developed together with Xavier Gilbert) provides a dynamic perspective on business strategy, as opposed to the more unidimensional perspective of generic strategies. Instead of competing solely on value, or cost, firms can outpace the competition by shifting strategic innovation between the value proposition and the value delivery system in a timely way that reenergizes the organization and develops complementary capabilities that provide a competitive advantage.

Industry Breakpoints

Industry Breakpoints involve a new offering to the market that changes the rules of the competitive game, shifts the industry growth rate and realigns market shares. Breakpoints are triggered not only by disruptive technology innovations, but also by divergent competitive shifts in the variety and customization of the value proposition, or convergent shifts in the scope and organizational efficiency of the value delivery system.

== Books ==
- Strebel, Paul (2009). Smart Big Moves: The story behind strategic breakthroughs (1st ed.). FT Prentice Hall. ISBN 978-0273714262.
- Strebel, Paul (2007). Trajectory Management: Leading a business over time (1st ed.). Wiley. ISBN 978-0470862902.
- Strebel, Paul (2005). Mastering Executive Education: How to combine content with context and emotion. Prentice Hall Pearson Education. ISBN 978-0273705024.
- Strebel, Paul (2000). Focused Energy: Mastering bottom-up organization (1st ed.). Wiley. ISBN 978-0471899716.
- Strebel, Paul (1999). The Change Pact: Building commitment to ongoing change. Financial Times/Prentice Hall. ISBN 978-0273632948.
- Strebel, Paul (1992). Breakpoints: How managers exploit radical business change. Harvard Business Review Press. ISBN 978-0875843698.
- Strebel, Paul (1987). In the Shadows of Wall Street: A Guide to Investing in Neglected Stocks. Prentice Hall. ISBN 9780134559995.
