= List of 1988 Winter Olympics broadcasters =

The 1988 Winter Olympics in Calgary were televised by a number of broadcasters throughout the world.

The 1988 Winter Olympic Games coincided with a shift in television policy by the International Olympic Committee and growing enthusiasm by broadcasters in the United States. Amendments to the Olympic Charter in 1977 established a policy mandating joint television rights involving the IOC and the local organizing committee, and was enshrined in the 1981 bid agreement for the Calgary games.

== Effect of television on the 1988 Winter Olympics ==
OCO'88 made several alterations to the Olympic program as part of efforts to ensure value for its broadcast partners. Premier events, including ice hockey, figure skating, and speed skating were scheduled for prime time and could not continue past 9:00 p.m. EST, resulting in odd starting times such as 5:45 p.m. or 6:15 p.m. MST. The OCO'88 organizers described the time requirements dictated by ABC's contract as resulting in "unnecessarily complex" restrictions on ice hockey, which shared the Olympic Saddledome with figure skating, particularly noting the 90 minute turnaround time to allow patrons to enter and exit and make adjustments to the ice surface. The Games were lengthened to 16 days from the previous 12 to ensure three weekends of coverage, and special event consideration was given for February 15 which was the national holiday of Presidents' Day in the United States.

However, a significant downturn in advertising revenue for sporting events resulted in ABC forecasting significant financial losses on the Games. Calgary organizers appreciated their fortunate timing in signing the deal. King described the timing of the contract with ABC as "the passing of the sun and the moon at the right time for Calgary". The revenue growth from broadcasting was significant for the Calgary Games, the 1980 Lake Placid Games generated US$20.7 million, while OCO'88 generated $324.9 million in broadcast rights. ABC lost an estimated $60 million, and broadcast rights to the 1992 Winter Olympics were later sold to the CBS network for $243 million, a 20 per cent reduction compared to Calgary.

== Broadcast contracts ==
=== Canada ===
Prior to the 1988 Winter Olympics, Canadian Olympic broadcasting was shared between the CTV Television Network, the Canadian Broadcasting Corporation (CBC), and TVA in an agreement made in 1978. CTV approached the CBC with the agreement led by CTV Sports Vice-president Johnny Esaw who saw the risk soaring broadcast rights would bring to the networks. This sharing agreement allowed the Canadian rights to remain relatively affordable and to provide Olympic coverage to all of Canada. The agreement gave the rights to the Summer Olympics to the CBC and the Winter Olympics to CTV, and each broadcaster could air a nightly summary for the Olympics they were not the Canadian broadcaster for.

After Calgary was awarded the 1988 Olympics Esaw and CTV continued to support sharing the rights to the Olympic Games, however in a meeting with CBC Head of Sports Denis Harvey, Esaw was informed the CBC intended to end the agreement. Harvey believed the CBC as the national broadcaster would be awarded the television rights. Esaw had previously built a strong relationship with influential figures in the Calgary bid including Bill Pratt through his work covering the Calgary Stampede, which Pratt was the General Manager of. Esaw also saw an advantage in bidding with his Western Canadian heritage. The bid was especially important as the winner of the Canadian broadcast rights for the Games would also include the role as the host broadcaster, responsible for the manpower and equipment to televise the games for other international broadcasters. Esaw proposed that CTV would cover the Calgary Olympics using rented equipment rather than buying new equipment. Previously, the CBC served as the host broadcaster for the 1976 Montreal Summer Olympics and purchased new equipment which the broadcaster kept, and by renting CTV could keep costs down for OCO'88.

In November 1983, CTV submitted two bids to OCO'88, submitting CA$4.5 million for the exclusive Canadian broadcasting rights, and a $23.5 million bid to serve as the host broadcaster. (Note: Michael Nolan states the bid for host broadcaster was CA$39,072,000, while the announcement lists the contract value at CA$23.5 million, Frank King notes that CTV was paid nearly $50 million to build and equip the International Broadcast Centre.) Later in December 1983, CTV was awarded both the exclusive Canadian broadcasting rights and the role as host broadcaster. The nightly summary of the Games was also televised on CBC. French language coverage in Quebec was provided by TVA.

Frank King noted that CTV won due to its lower bid, experience working with possible United States rights holder ABC through Wide World of Sports, and CTV's conciliatory approach to negotiations. OCO'88 also noted that CTV's bid would see a net cost savings of CA$6.7 million. The CBC was awarded the exclusive radio broadcast rights in Canada for CA$50,000.

CTV planned to produce 550 hours of coverage for the Games to be broadcast around the world and provide 120 hours of coverage broadcast in Canada. This was accomplished with 1,400 staff brought from CTV affiliates around Canada. CTV charged CA$18,500 for 30 seconds of commercial time during the Calgary Games.

=== Eastern Europe ===
The rights to broadcast the 1988 Winter Olympic Games were awarded to International Radio and Television Organisation for Eastern Europe.

=== Japan ===
The Japanese broadcast rights were awarded to NHK in July 1986 for US$3.9 million.

=== United States ===
The joint negotiating committee convened in late-January at the Lausanne Palace prior to the Sarajevo games in 1984 to negotiate the Calgary television contracts with American broadcasters. The co-negotiating committee was represented by Dick Pound for the IOC, Bill Wardle for OCO and consultant Barry Frank. The co-negotiating committee designed a new tender process for the television rights bid with an emphasis on creating a level playing field for all broadcasters. For the first time, the negotiations were based on a series of sealed bids and representatives from ABC, CBS and NBC vied for the opportunity to broadcast the Games.

After six rounds of sealed bids, the ABC delegation led by producer Roone Arledge was successful with a record agreement paying US$309 million in exchange for exclusive rights for the games. CBS exited the bidding process after the second round with a final offer of $257 million, while ABC and NBC both reached the fifth round with an offer of $300 million. In the sixth and final stage, the IOC and OCO decided a coin flip would determine which of ABC or NBC had the right to submit the first bid, or defer, and decision neither network supported. NBC's president of sports Arthur A. Watson elected to call the coin-flip, although he remained silent on the first flip, so a second coinflip was required, and NBC won with a choice of "heads", and after 30 minutes of deliberation submitted a $304 million bid. ABC's representative Arledge made a quick phone call to executive Fred Pierce, and ABC submitted a $309 million bid exceeded the NBC bid by $5 million. ABC's record setting bid was immediately controversial, first Arledge had exceeded the maximum allowable bid set by ABC's executives by $34 million, and in the coming weeks ABC's coverage of the 1984 Winter Olympics which cost $91.5 million returned poor Nielsen ratings. Early estimates speculated the network would lose $50-$60 million televising the games. The Wall Street Journal described the NBC agreement as the "biggest prize of the [1984] Winter Olympics". The deal, at the time the highest amount ever paid for a sporting event, allowed organizers to announce the Games would be debt-free.

The ABC television contract would be void if the Winter Games were cancelled or postponed past March 1, 1988, if the Games were moved to a location outside of Western Canada, or if the United States Olympic Team declined to participate. The contract also allowed for a reduction in payments by ABC if events or days were cancelled, the broadcast signal from Calgary did not operate properly, OCO'88 failed to provide adequate facilities, or if a boycott occurred. OCO'88 mitigated the risk by taking out a US$100 million insurance policy on the ABC contract. The exclusive radio broadcast rights were later awarded to ABC for $1.

Shortly after the ABC agreement was finalized, the United States Olympic Committee (USOC) made legal threats to the IOC, OCO'88 and Seoul organizing committee insisting on financial compensation for the USOC's consent for Olympic telecasts to occur in the United States. The USOC argument was the use of Olympic emblems in commercial advertising in the United States threatened the program's domestic sponsorship programs. A legal opinion from the Seoul organizing committee lawyer Don Petroni stated the USOC claim had merit under the Amateur Sports Act, and IOC director of legal affairs Howard Stupp confirmed Petroni's opinion. An agreement was reached where OCO'88 paid the USOC CA$7 million for rights to broadcast the Games in the United States.

ABC planned for 98 hours of coverage, and 53 hours of prime-time coverage for the 1988 Winter Olympics, which allowed the broadcaster to sell approximately 1,800 30-second commercial spots in prime-time. ABC estimated the games would bring in a prime-time rating of 21.5. After the Games, Nielsen noted that ABC's coverage of the Calgary Olympic Games allowed the network to win the "February Sweeps" with an average rating of 17.3/27, and an Olympic prime-time average rating of 19.3/30, significantly higher than the 1984 Sarajevo Games prime-time ratings of 18.4/30.

=== Western Europe ===
The negotiations with American television broadcasters was in sharp contrast to negotiations for Western European rights with the European Broadcasting Union quickly closing an exclusive deal with the IOC for US$5.7 million led by Juan Antonio Samaranch and Marc Hodler on behalf of the IOC. The Calgary Herald headline after the announcement negatively reflected on the "bargain" the European network received, and OCO'88 chairman Frank King publicly expressed his disappointment with the IOC. King expected the Western European rights to bring around US$10 million. Samaranch's argument for providing for a privileged negotiation with EBU was ensuring European viewers had equal access and coverage of the games, something he did not believe would occur if private networks from each nation were provided the opportunity to bid. Dick Pound was critical of the decision and argued more revenue could be brought in from British and Italian networks alone and the privileged status suppressed the willingness of the EBU to make a market value bid on the games.
