= Château d'Ouchy =

Castle in Lausanne, Switzerland

Coordinates: 46.5068°N 6.6274°E

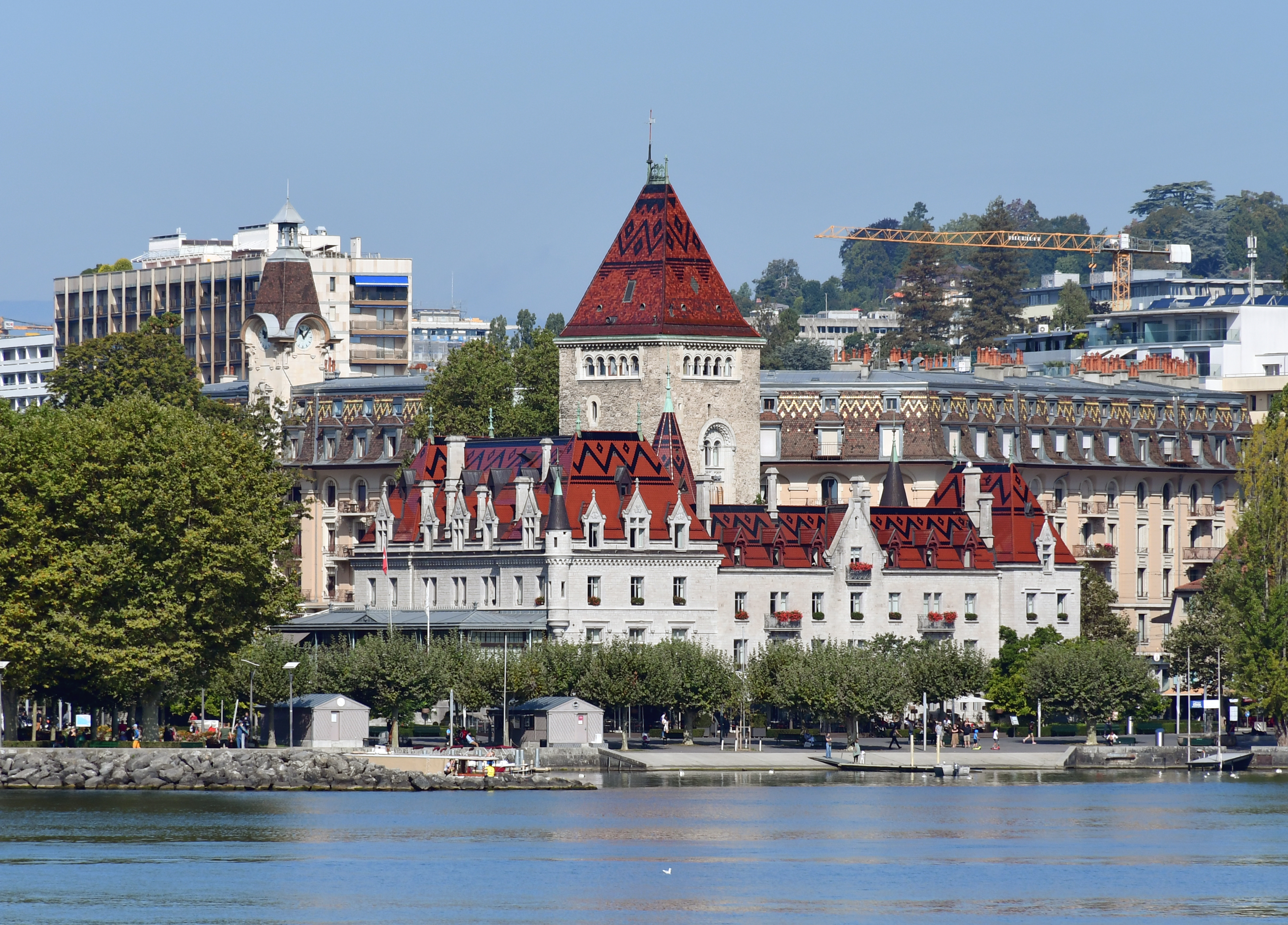
- The Château d'Ouchy in 2019
- Interactive map of the Château d'Ouchy area

General information
- Location: Lausanne, Switzerland, Place du Port 2, 1006 Lausanne
- Year built: 1893; 133 years ago
- Owner: Sandoz Family Foundation

Technical details
- Floor count: 7

Design and construction
- Architect: Francis Isoz

Other information
- Number of rooms: 50
- Number of restaurants: 1

Website
- Official website

The Château d'Ouchy (French pronunciation: [ʃato duʃi]; Castle of Ouchy) is a hotel built on the site of a former medieval castle in the Ouchy lakeside neighbourhood of Lausanne, Switzerland by businessman Jean-Jacques Mercier between 1889 and 1893. It belongs to the hotel division of the Sandoz Family Foundation.

== History ==
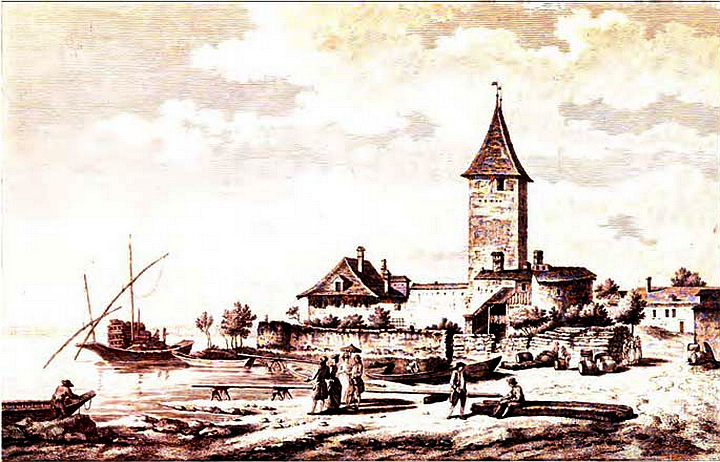
Harbour and castle, 1784

It was first constructed by the Bishop of Lausanne as a tower on the banks of Lake Geneva around 1170. A century later, it was rebuilt and transformed into a fortified residence for bishops, particularly for Guillaume de Varax. It was also used as prison. The castle was abandoned and its tower reduced to ashes in 1609. The canton of Vaud recovered it after the departure of the Berneses and sold off part of the land to Jean-Jacques Mercier in 1885. The new owner radically transformed the castle by demolishing the ruins and old buildings, leaving only the tower.

The castle was rebuilt in the Neo-Gothic style between 1889 and 1893 and converted into a hotel.

According to Joseph Grew many of the leading figures of the Treaty of Lausanne were staying at the hotel and there is a plaque of the 1923 Treaty of Lausanne at the Château d'Ouchy commemorating the peace treaty.
