= Eugène Péquignot =

Swiss federal civil servant (1889–1962)

- Péquignot at the Genoa Conference, 1922
- Born: 5 February 1889; Saignelégier, Switzerland
- Died: 26 November 1962 (aged 73); Biel/Bienne, Switzerland
- Occupations: Lawyer; civil servant
- Spouse: Jeanne Gueniot (m. 1915)

Eugène Péquignot (5 February 1889 – 26 November 1962) was a Swiss lawyer and federal civil servant. From 1939 to 1954 he was secretary general of the Federal Department of Economic Affairs. He played a leading part in drafting the price control legislation of 1936, the special regime of the war economy, and the watch statute of 1951.

== Biography ==
Eugène Péquignot was the son of Ernest Péquignot, a lawyer, and Louise née Simon. In 1915 he married Jeanne Gueniot, daughter of Jules. He studied law in Bern from 1907 to 1910 and obtained a doctorate. From 1911 to 1913 he worked as a lawyer in his father's law office.

In 1913 he joined the federal Department of Trade, Industry and Agriculture, which became the Department of Economic Affairs in 1915. He was its secretary from 1923 to 1938 and its secretary general from 1939 to 1954. He was the driving force behind the legislation on price controls (1936), the special regime of the war economy, and the watch statute (French statut de l'horlogerie, German Uhrenstatut) of 1951. He was also a delegate to several international conferences, among them the economic conference in Genoa in 1922. In 1932 he was an expert in the free zones case, and from 1938 to 1939 a member of the Economic Committee of the League of Nations. Lore Sandoz-Peter, general manager of the Swiss branch of the Bulova Watch Company, negotiated with him the granting of expansion and manufacturing permits, and as a result Bulova's Neuchâtel branch opened in 1947.

In 1942 he received an honorary doctorate from the University of Lausanne, and in 1943 he was made an honorary citizen (bourgeois d'honneur) of Saignelégier. From 1957 to 1962 he was the first president of the Université populaire jurassienne (Jura people's university).

== Bibliography ==
- Eugène Péquignot, 1889–1962, ancien secrétaire général du Département fédéral de l'économie publique, exhibition catalog, Porrentruy, 1987
- C. Nydegger, Perception et défense des intérêts jurassiens par un haut fonctionnaire fédéral, licentiate thesis, Fribourg, 1997

=== Archives ===
- Papers, Archives de la République et Canton du Jura, Porrentruy
