= Alcohol Act (Switzerland) =

Swiss federal law

Federal Act on Distilled Water
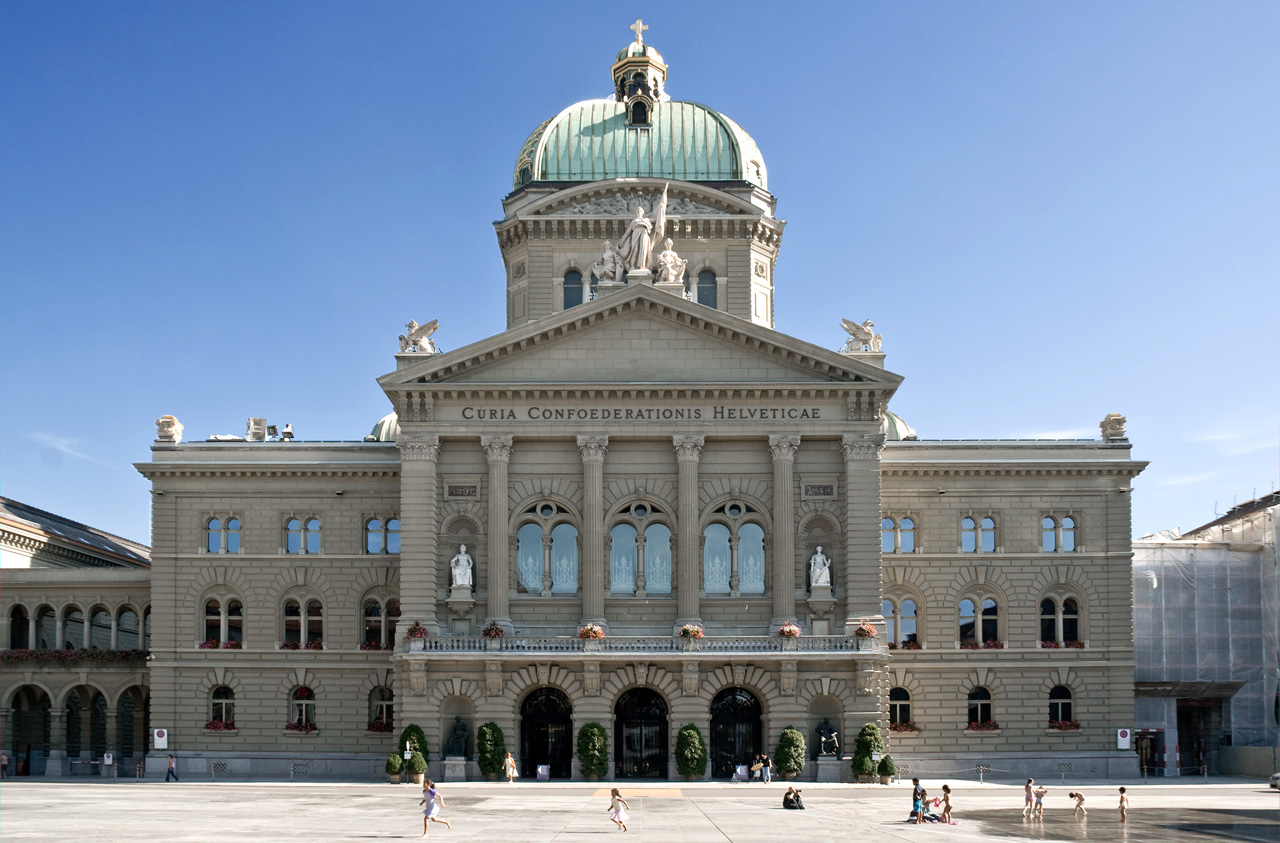

Federal Assembly of Switzerland
- Long title: SR 680
- Territorial extent: Switzerland
- Enacted by: Federal Assembly of Switzerland
- Enacted: 21 June 1932
- Commenced: 1 January 1933
- Status: Current legislation

The Alcohol Act (Note: German: Alkoholgesetz, AlkG; French: Loi fédérale sur l’alcool, LAlc; Italian: Legge sull’alcool, LAlc) is a Swiss federal law that regulates the manufacture, distribution, acquisition and consumption of alcoholic beverages. It was introduced in 1933 and is based on articles 105 and 131(1)(b) and (3) of the Swiss Constitution.

The Federal Office for Customs and Border Security is responsible for the implementation of the alcohol legislation.

Until 2019, the law gave the Confederation an import monopoly, making Switzerland the last country in Europe to liberalise the ethanol market.

== Scope of the law ==
The Alcohol Act applies to beverages containing ethanol in any form and irrespective of the way they are manufactured.

Certain products obtained by fermentation (beer, cider, wine or fruit wine) are excluded as long as their alcohol content is below 15%, or 18% for natural wines. These products are not covered by this law, but by the Foodstuffs Act (RS 817.0). Products with added alcohol are subject to the law regardless of their alcohol content (Art. 2).

The Federal Law on Alcohol regulates the manufacture, trade and taxation of spirit drinks. It also contains provisions on the import and distribution of ethanol. The Swiss Confederation has a monopoly on both the manufacture of spirit drinks and the manufacture and import of ethanol.

== History ==
The first alcohol law dates from 1887 and was primarily concerned with the production of potato brandy. It was enacted because of the Kartoffelschnapspest (alcohol plague) that was rife at the time. It was not until 1932 that all distilled drinks were included in the first total revision of the Alcohol Act. In addition, the processing of fruit and potatoes into products that do not contain alcohol was encouraged from 1949 onwards.

In 1997, the Alcohol Act was partially revised, resulting in the liberalisation of the alcohol market and the introduction of the single tax rate. Measures were also taken to make the production process of Swiss industries more efficient. Finally, the principle of processing fruit and potatoes into products that do not contain alcohol was incorporated into agricultural policy.

=== Aborted total revision project (2008–2015) ===
==== Background ====
The Alcohol Act is one of the oldest federal laws of the Swiss Confederation. Despite several partial revisions, it no longer corresponds to today's economic and social realities.

- The "alcohol plague" of the 19th and 20th centuries is no longer a bad memory and has been replaced by a generally responsible attitude towards alcohol.
- Swiss production of spirits is on the decline. Over the past 30 years, the market share of Swiss spirits has fallen from 80% to 13%, which corresponds to 3% of all alcoholic beverages consumed in Switzerland.
- Since 2008, almost no ethanol is produced in Switzerland.

The entry into force of the new Federal Constitution has also changed the legal framework: the Confederation is no longer obliged to take measures to reduce the import and production of spirit drinks and ethanol. Article 105 of the new Federal Constitution only states that the Confederation must take into account the harmful effects of alcohol consumption.

==== Objectives ====
The complete revision of the Alcohol Act was to be an important condition for a more effective federal alcohol policy. In particular, the following three objectives were to be achieved:

- liberalisation of the ethanol and spirits market;
- optimisation of the taxation and control system;
- optimisation of the system of the law.

=== Consultation procedure (2010) ===
On 30 June 2010, the Federal Council opened the consultation procedure for the total revision of the Alcohol Act. On this occasion, it presented two projects of law:

- The Taxation of Spirits Act, which would regulate the collection and control of the consumption tax on spirits and ethanol for consumption;
- The (new) Alcohol Act, which would bring together the provisions governing the trade in and advertising of alcoholic beverages, which are currently spread across different laws, and makes them subject to more uniform enforcement powers.

Between the beginning of July and the end of October 2010, the Federal Alcohol Board (FAB), which was responsible for the revision project, received 183 submissions.

The project of law on the taxation of spirits received broad support. While the cantons and municipalities welcomed the alcohol law project, the business community criticised the proposed measures as going too far and pointed to the lack of a constitutional basis for regulating the sale of wine and beer. The representatives of the prevention sector approved the orientation of the new alcohol law, but considered the proposed measures to be insufficient. Various cantons shared this opinion.

=== Message of the Federal Council (2012) ===
Taking into account the results of the consultation procedure, the Federal Council approved the message concerning the total revision of the Alcohol Act on 25 January 2012. It therefore submitted two draft laws to the Federal Chambers, one on the taxation of spirits and the other on the trade in alcohol.

Three monopolies (manufacture and import of ethanol and manufacture of spirits) and 41 of the 43 state licences were to be abolished. Targeted tax relief compatible with international agreements would relieve the industry (deductions for production, processing and storage losses; progressive taxation of micro-producers; tax exemption for foodstuffs containing spirit drinks).

Restrictions on advertising of spirit drinks would be slightly relaxed, but lifestyle representations would remain prohibited.

The legal age limits for the supply of alcoholic beverages (18 years for spirits and 16 years for beer and wine), the creation of a legal basis for test purchases and the prohibition of the supply of alcoholic beverages to minors would strengthen the effectiveness of the provisions aimed at protecting young people. In addition, the "syrup article", which is regulated at federal level, would oblige pubs to offer three non-alcoholic drinks at a lower price than the cheapest alcoholic drink. The aim of this requirement was not only to encourage the consumption of non-alcoholic drinks, but also to limit the sale of alcohol at extremely low prices.

In order to combat the new problems in a targeted manner, the Federal Council proposed to introduce a regime for the sale of alcohol at night ("night regime"). Between 10 p.m. and 6 a.m., retail outlets would be prohibited from selling alcohol and pubs would be prohibited from offering alcohol on sale.

In order to take account of regional specificities, these measures would be designed as a federal standard and could be supplemented by the cantons if necessary.

Once the federal government's monopoly on ethanol imports is lifted, Alcosuisse, the FAB's profit centre, would be privatised. The rest of the FAB would lose its legal personality and be integrated into the Federal Customs Administration, which would be responsible for implementing the federal government's alcohol policy and monitoring the alcohol market.

=== Parliamentary debates (2013–2015) ===
On 15 January 2013, the Committee for Economic Affairs and Taxation of the Council of States (priority council) began to discuss the draft revision of the Alcohol Act.

After lengthy and heated debates, the draft revision was closed in the winter session of 2015 during the procedure for eliminating differences.

Prior to the closure of the total revision, three main differences remained between the two chambers of parliament:

- taxation system: in contrast to the Council of States, the National Council was in favour of a package of measures to relieve the domestic production sector, including a regulation on missing quantities, a 30% tax reduction for annual production of up to 1,000 litres of pure alcohol, as well as non-tax incentives.
- tax rate: the Council of States wanted to maintain the current rate of CHF 29 per litre of pure alcohol. The National Council was in favour of raising the rate to CHF 32.
- sale of alcohol: the Council of States wanted to ban retail sales between 10 pm and 6 am. The National Council rejected this ban.

=== Partial revision (2016) ===
After the total revision project was shelved, the Federal Council proposed a partial revision of the law in two stages.

The first partial revision was launched in early 2016. It is limited to three aspects that were not contested in the total revision project closed in December 2015, namely the integration of the Federal Alcohol Board (FAB) into the Federal Customs Administration (FCA), the privatisation of Alcosuisse and the liberalisation of the ethanol market. The Federal Council submitted its message to Parliament on 6 April 2016. Parliament approved the draft partial revision of the law without amendments in the autumn 2016 session. The entry into force and liberalisation of the market took place in stages in 2017, 2018 and 2019.

== See also ==
- Alcohol law
  - Alcohol packaging warning messages
- Alcoholism in Switzerland
