= Lore Sandoz-Peter =

Swiss business executive (1899–1989)

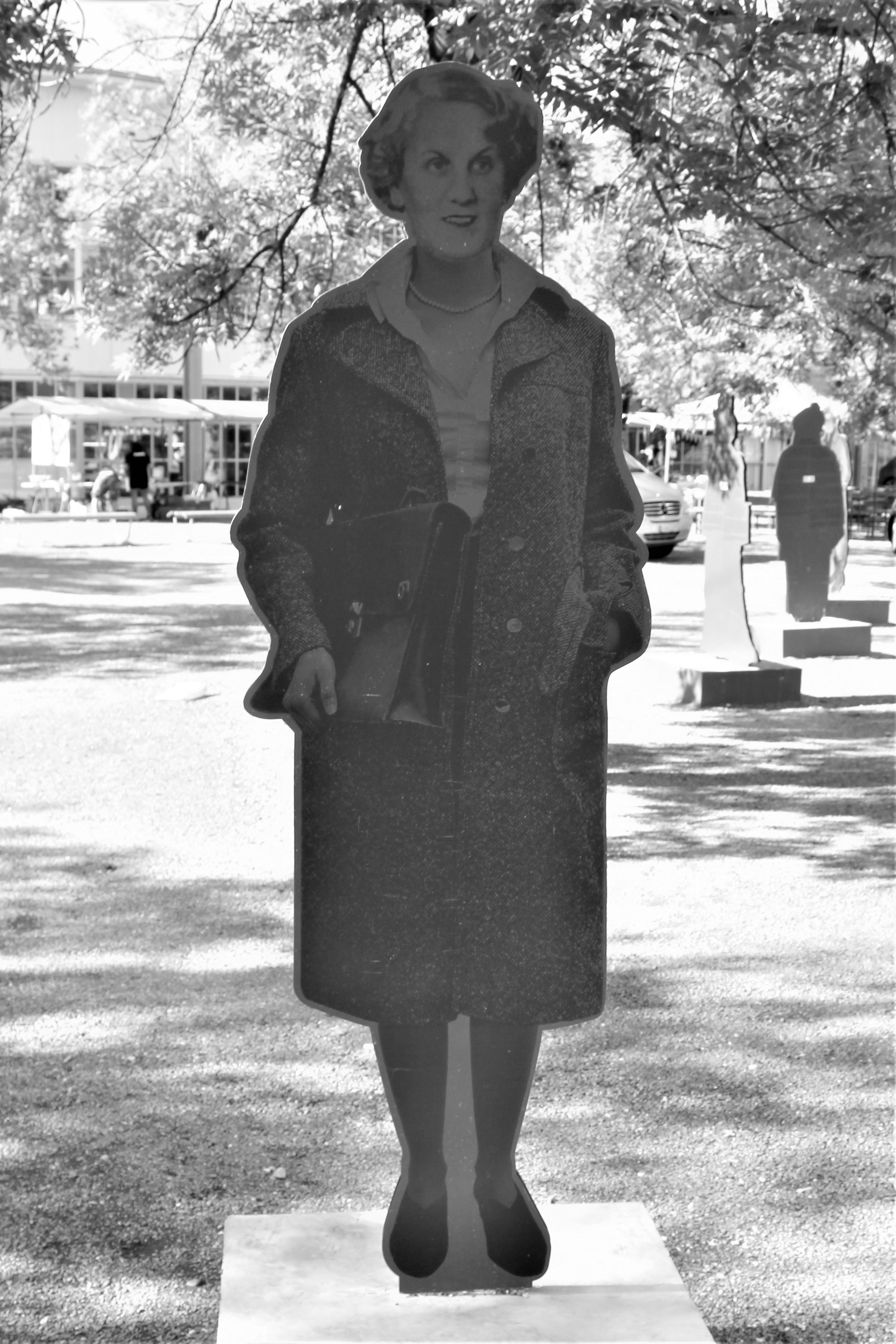
- Silhouette figure of Sandoz-Peter in the ExceptionnELLES exhibition, Biel/Bienne, 2022
- Born: Lore Hertha Peter; 29 June 1899; Biel/Bienne, Switzerland
- Died: 9 October 1989 (aged 90); Biel/Bienne, Switzerland
- Occupations: Business executive; philanthropist
- Employer: Bulova Watch Company
- Spouse: Jules Sandoz (m. 1941)

Lore Sandoz-Peter (born Lore Hertha Peter; 29 June 1899 – 9 October 1989) was a Swiss business executive and philanthropist. From 1930 she was general manager of the Swiss branch of the American Bulova Watch Company in Biel/Bienne, and from 1957 to 1961 she was vice-chair of the company's board of directors.

== Biography ==
Lore Hertha Peter, the second of five children, was the daughter of Gottfried Peter, a banker, and Katharina Friederike Michelette née Moll. She grew up in a middle-class family from the Seeland that was active in finance and industry. As director of the Biel/Bienne branch of the Berner Kantonalbank, her father took part in founding several employers' associations in the watch industry. Her brother Walter Peter first worked at the London branch of the Swiss Bank Corporation and went into the watch industry on his return to Switzerland in the late 1920s. It was in this particular family setting that Lore Peter began a career that was exceptional for a woman at the time. After compulsory schooling and commercial school in Biel/Bienne, she did an internship as an office clerk at the power company Bernische Kraftwerke and then attended a private housekeeping school in the Seeland. From 1922 to 1926, probably encouraged by her father and her brother, she was entrusted by a bank in Biel/Bienne with the liquidation of a watch factory. This experience made her familiar with the particular business practices of établissage (the assembly of watches from supplied parts).

In 1927 Lore Peter joined the American Bulova Watch Company as an authorized signatory. The company had opened a small assembly workshop in Biel/Bienne in 1911. She rose rapidly through all levels of its Swiss branch: she was responsible for enlarging the premises in 1928, oversaw the conversion of the assembly workshop into a watch factory (manufacture) in 1929, and became general manager in 1930. At the time it was very rare for a woman to hold such a position.

In 1941 she married Jules Sandoz, an employee of the Swiss Alcohol Board and adjutant to General Henri Guisan during the mobilization. The couple had no children. After her marriage her career took on a new dimension. From 1942 she worked closely with her husband in managing Bulova's Swiss business. She negotiated expansion and manufacturing permits with Eugène Péquignot, secretary general of the Federal Department of Economic Affairs, and as a result Bulova's Neuchâtel branch opened in 1947. She also directed the construction and development of a new assembly plant in the center of Biel/Bienne (1949–1956). Within the company she introduced the five-day week and working hours adapted to mothers. In 1950 she hired the Basel engineer Max Hetzel, the inventor of the Accutron tuning-fork watch, which was mass-produced from 1960. With its electronic mechanism of constant precision, this watch was the first major technological innovation in the watch industry after World War II. Bulova thus became the world's fourth-largest watch producer. Its factory in Biel/Bienne turned out 1.3 million watches and movements a year, assembled by some 900 employees.

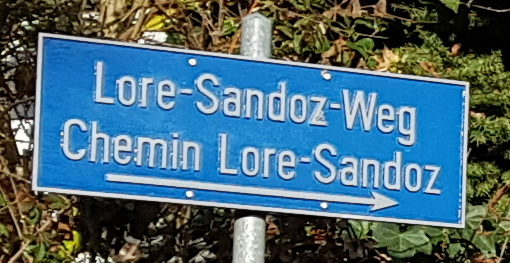
Street sign of the Lore-Sandoz-Weg / Chemin Lore-Sandoz in Biel/Bienne

In 1957 Arde Bulova, son of the company's founder Joseph Bulova, appointed Lore Sandoz-Peter vice-chair of the board of directors of the Bulova Watch Company in New York. Also responsible for the European and Swiss markets, she held these posts until her retirement in 1961. Alongside her professional activities she took up drawing, painting, golf, and physical exercise. She quietly took part in various philanthropic projects in the Biel/Bienne region related to education, culture, and the status of women. The Lore Sandoz-Peter Foundation, established in 1990, works in particular to support people in need and to promote the status of women in the Seeland. A street in Biel/Bienne has borne her name since 2000.
