= Sandow (surname) =

Sandow is a surname, and may refer to:

- Adam Sandow, American businessman
- Billy Sandow (1884–1972), American wrestler and promoter
- Chris Sandow (born 1989), Australian rugby league footballer
- Christian Sandow (born 1959), German modern pentathlete
- Eugen Sandow (1867–1925), Prussian bodybuilder
- Greg Sandow (born 1943), American music critic and composer
- Nick Sandow (born 1966), American actor, writer and director
- P. K. Raja Sandow (1894/5–1943), Indian actor, film director and producer

== See also ==
- Sandor
