= Lausanne Palace =

Historic luxury hotel in Lausanne, Switzerland

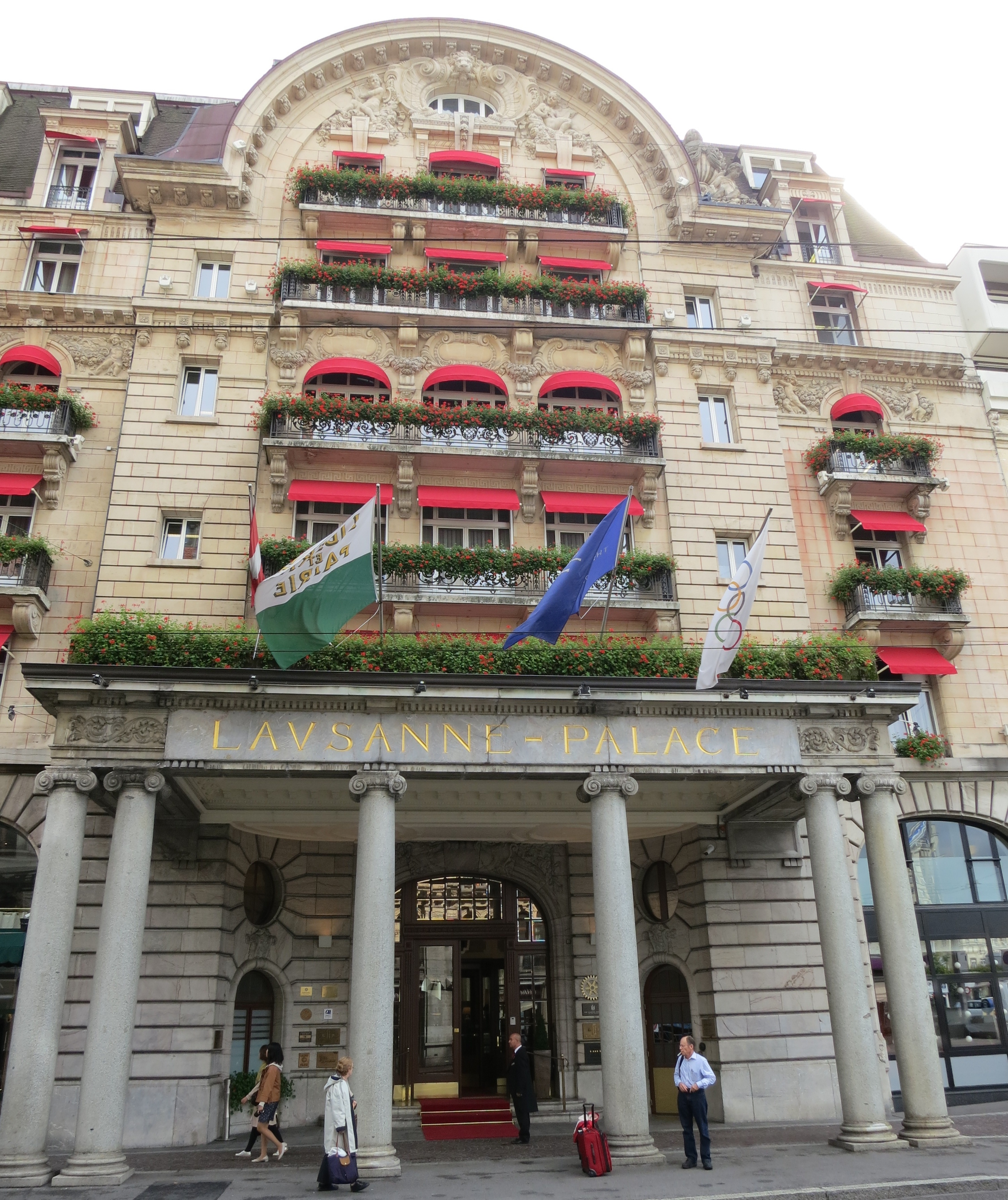
- The main entrance, with flags of Switzerland, Vaud, the Leading Hotels of the World and the Olympic flag (2013).

- Location within Switzerland

General information
- Architectural style: Belle Époque
- Location: Rue du grand-chêne 7-9, Lausanne, Switzerland
- Coordinates: 46.5194°N 6.6305°E
- Owner: Sandoz Family Foundation

Other information
- Number of rooms: 106
- Number of suites: 30
- Number of restaurants: 4
- Number of bars: 2
- Facilities: Conference, banquet and spa

Website
- https://www.lausanne-palace.ch/en/welcome-page

The Lausanne Palace is a historic luxury hotel in Lausanne, Switzerland. It is located in the city centre, near the Esplanade of Montbenon and has a view on Le Flon on one side and on the Lake Léman on the other. It is owned by the Sandoz Family Foundation.

== Presidents of the International Olympic Committee ==
Since 1994, Lausanne is recognised as the Olympic Capital; the Lausanne Palace was the residence of three presidents of the International Olympic Committee: Juan Antonio Samaranch (1980–2001), Jacques Rogge (2001–2013) and Thomas Bach (2013–2025).

In 2025, Kirsty Coventry became the IOC President and unlike her predecessors, she and her family are not living at the Lausanne Palace hotel. The cost of housing the IOC President at the hotel was €2,350 per night.

== Gallery ==
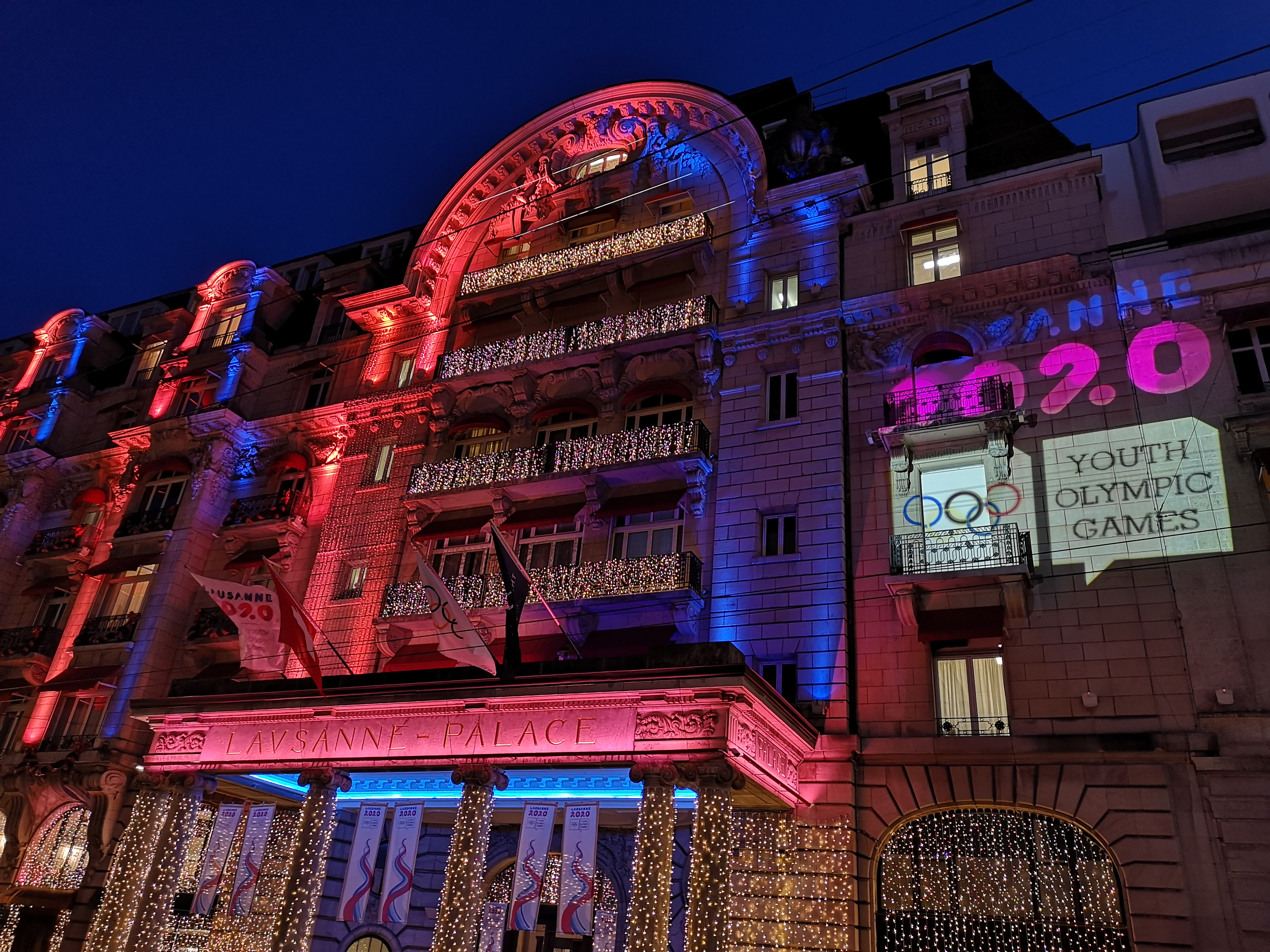
The hotel as seen at night

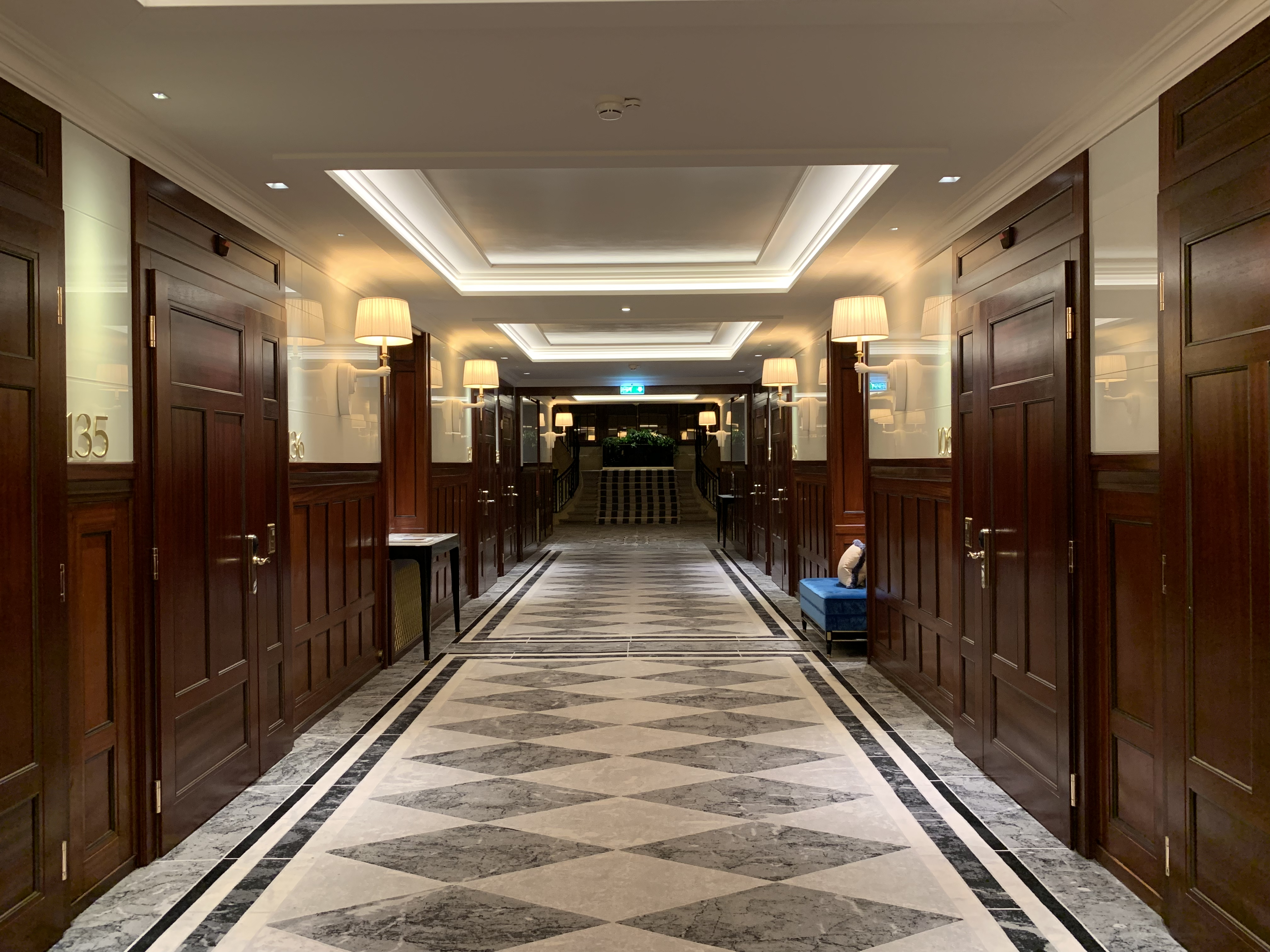
Hallway inside the hotel

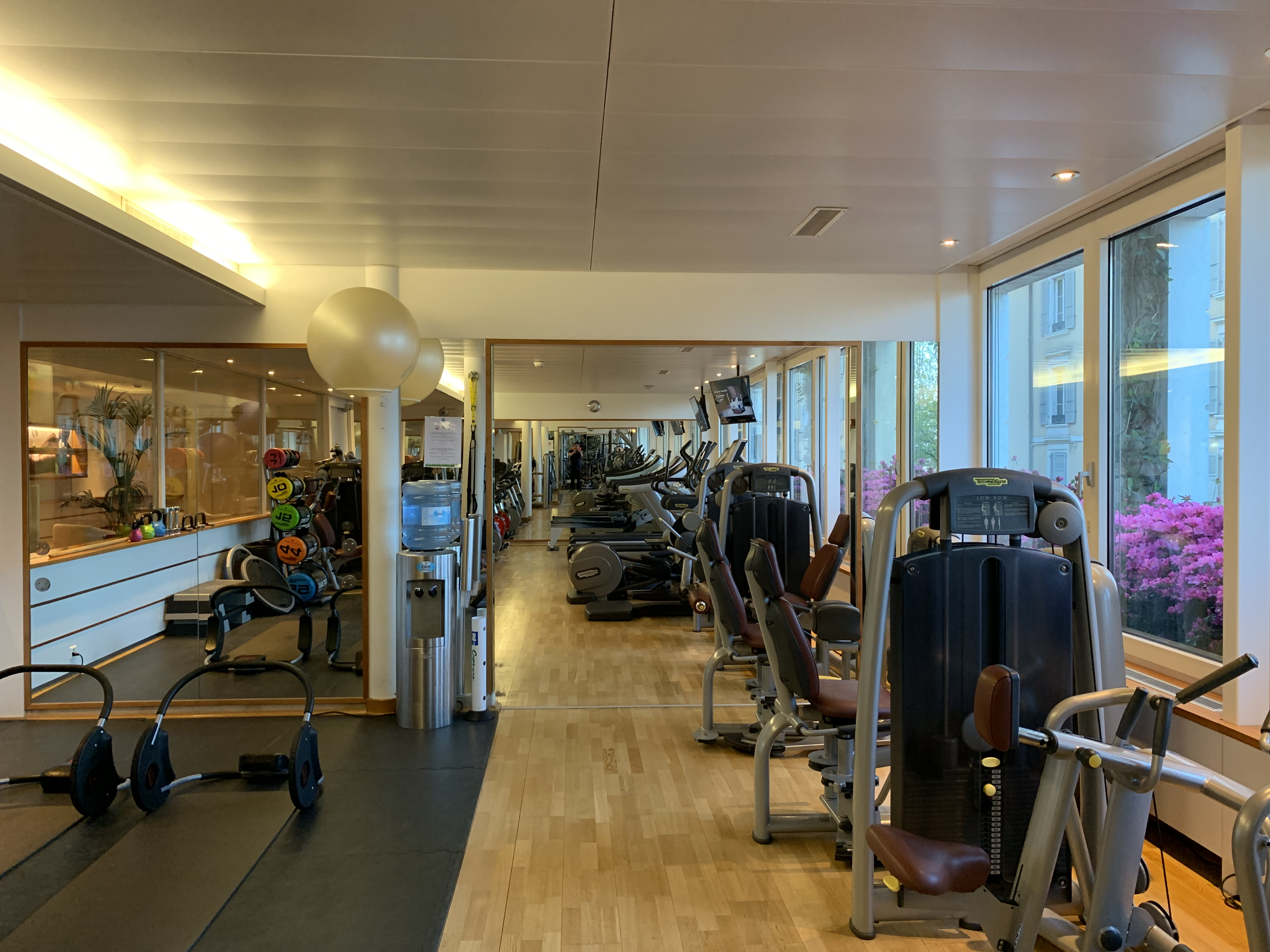
Hotel gym

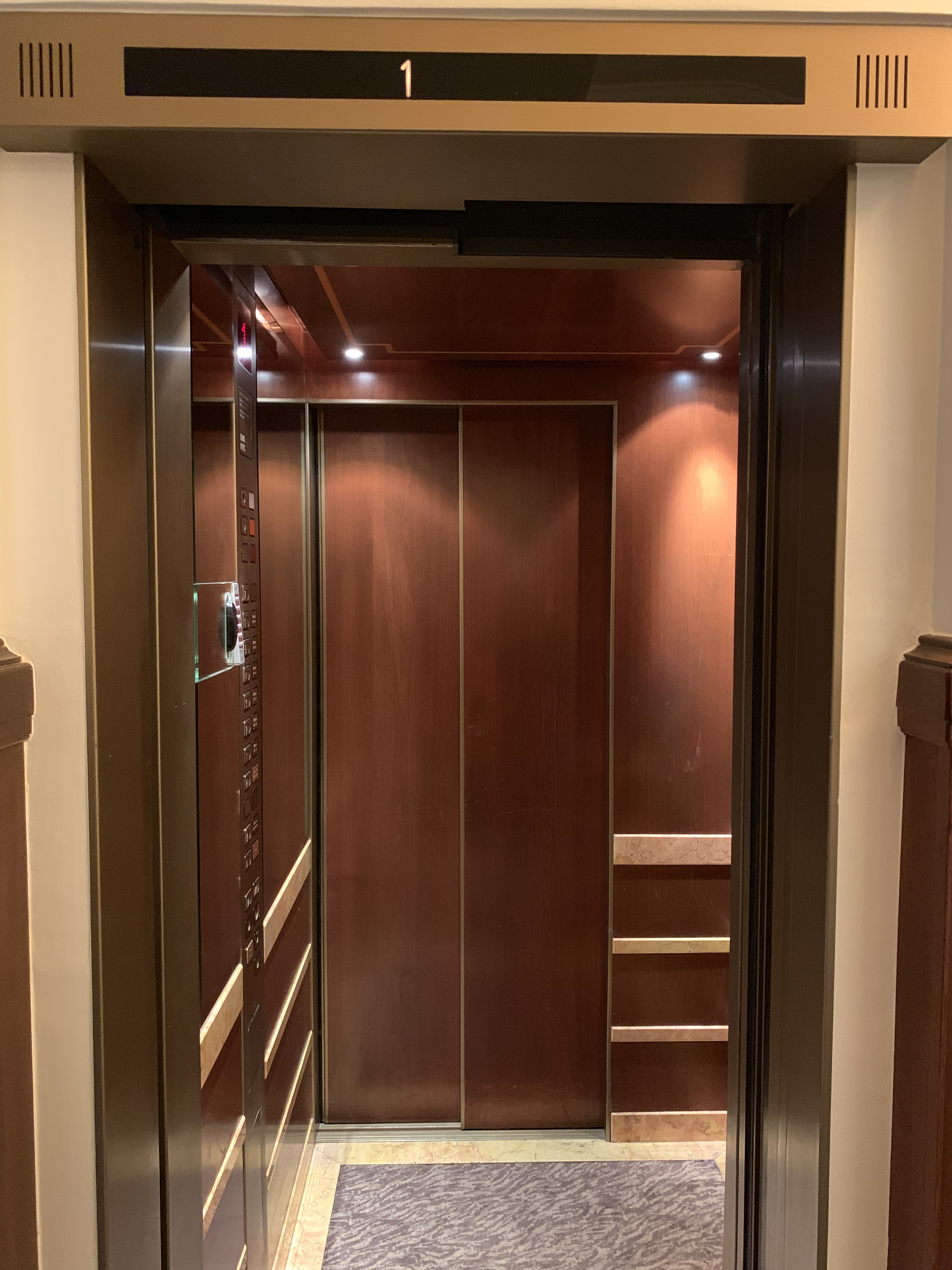
Elevator inside the hotel

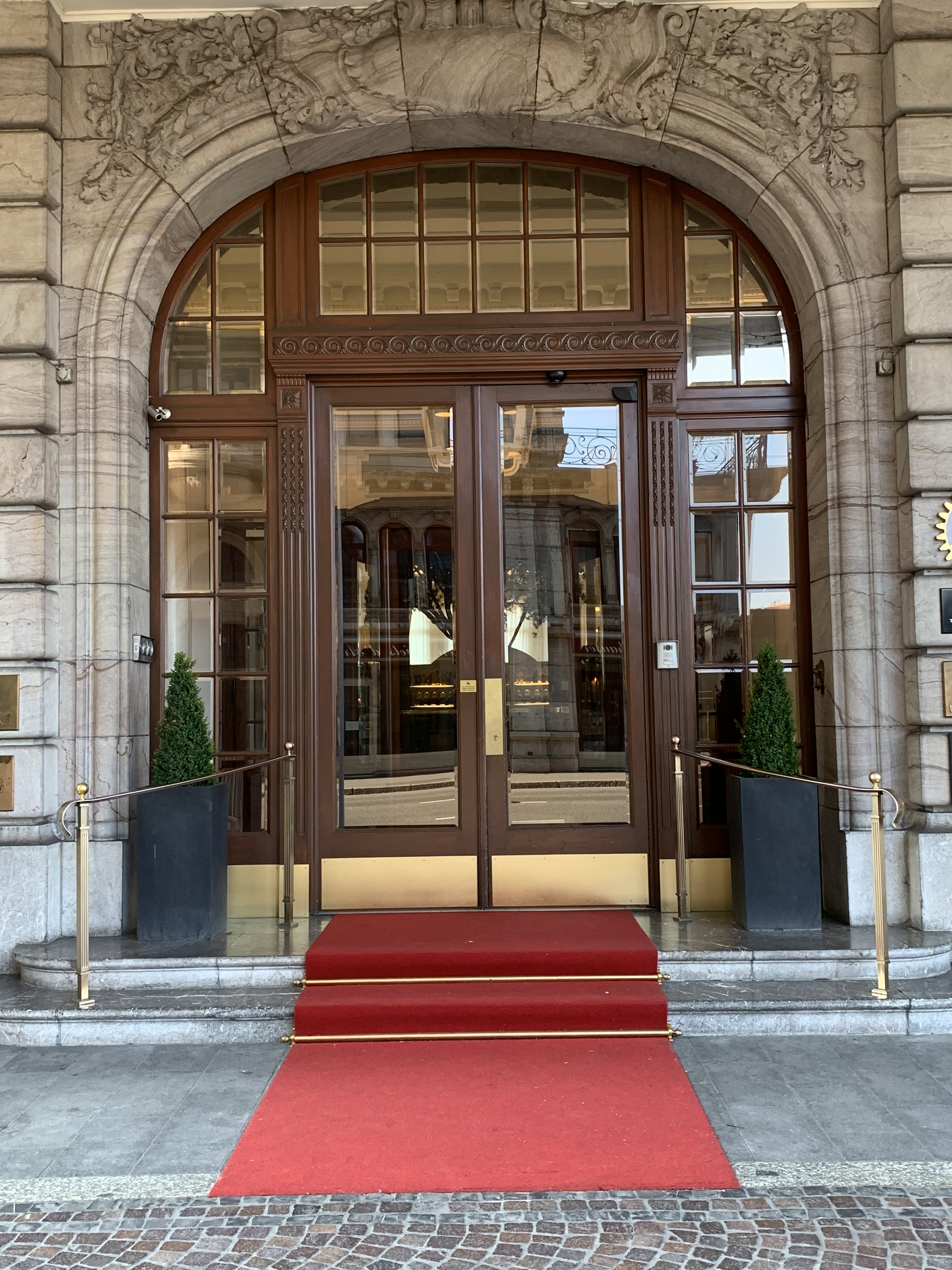
Main entrance to the hotel

== See also ==
- Beau-Rivage Palace
