= Beau-Rivage Palace =

Historical luxury hotel in Lausanne, Switzerland

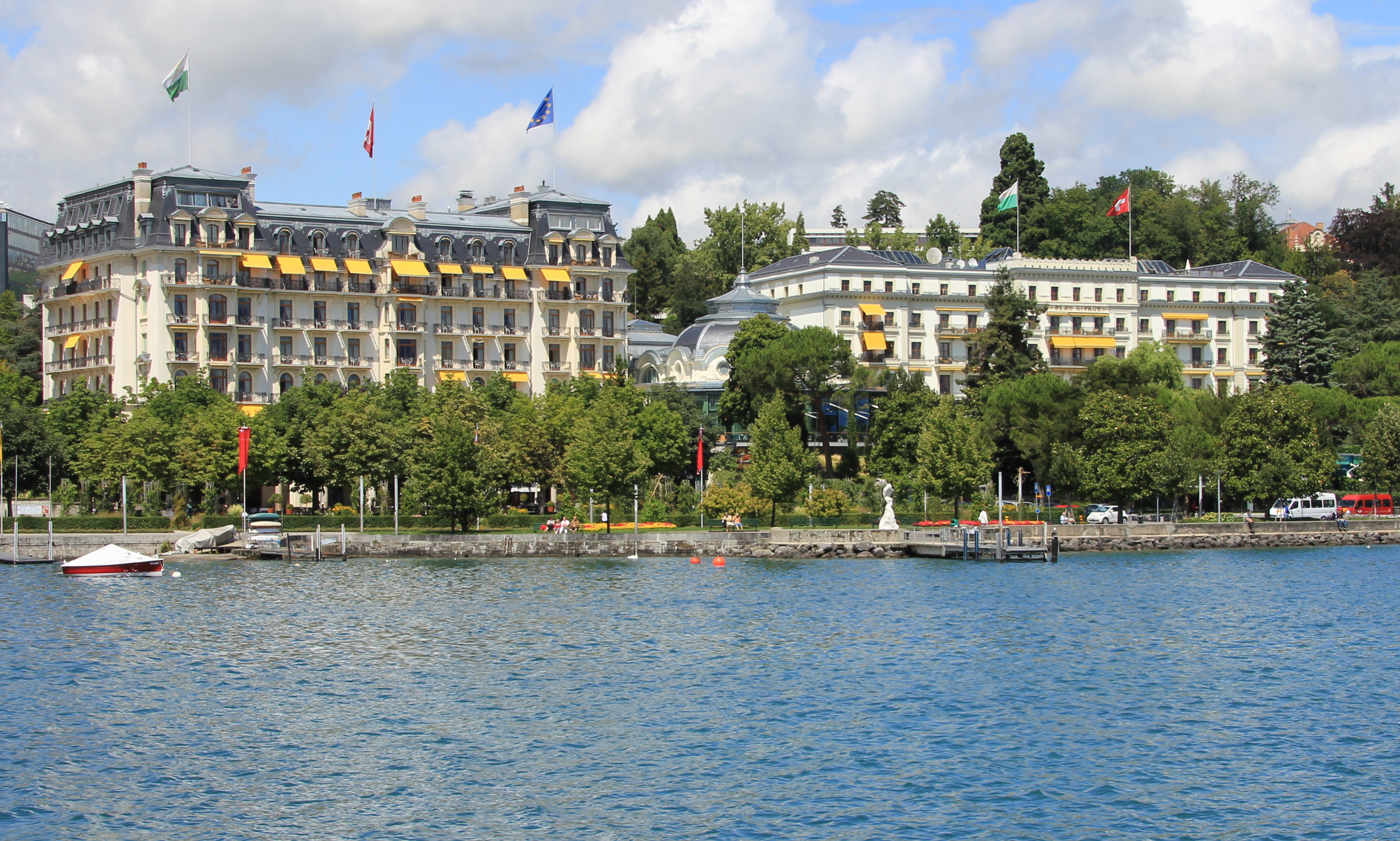
- Interactive map of the Beau-Rivage Palace area

General information
- Architectural style: Belle Époque
- Location: Place du port 17–19, Lausanne, Switzerland
- Coordinates: 46.508°N 6.630°E
- Inaugurated: 1861
- Owner: Sandoz Family Foundation

Other information
- Number of rooms: 168
- Number of suites: 26 "junior" and 8 "executive"
- Number of restaurants: 3
- Number of bars: 1
- Facilities: Conference, banquet, spa and wellness

Website
- www.brp.ch

The Beau-Rivage Palace is a historical luxury five-star hotel in Lausanne, Switzerland. It is located in Ouchy, on the shores of Lake Léman.

The hotel opened in 1861 and the current main building was constructed in Art Nouveau and neo-baroque style in 1908. It is registered in the Swiss Inventory of Cultural Property of National and Regional Significance.

The Beau-Rivage Palace is owned by Sandoz Family Foundation founders of Sandoz AG, now Novartis.

== Events ==
On 24 July 1923, the Treaty of Lausanne was signed at the Beau-Rivage Palace.

In March–April 2015, the negotiations on Iran nuclear deal framework for a comprehensive agreement on the Iranian nuclear programme took place in the Beau-Rivage Palace, where the foreign ministers and delegations from the United States, the United Kingdom, Russia, China, France, the European Union, Germany (P5+1) and Iran were also hosted. The final press conference, on 2 April 2015, was held at the EPFL Learning Centre.

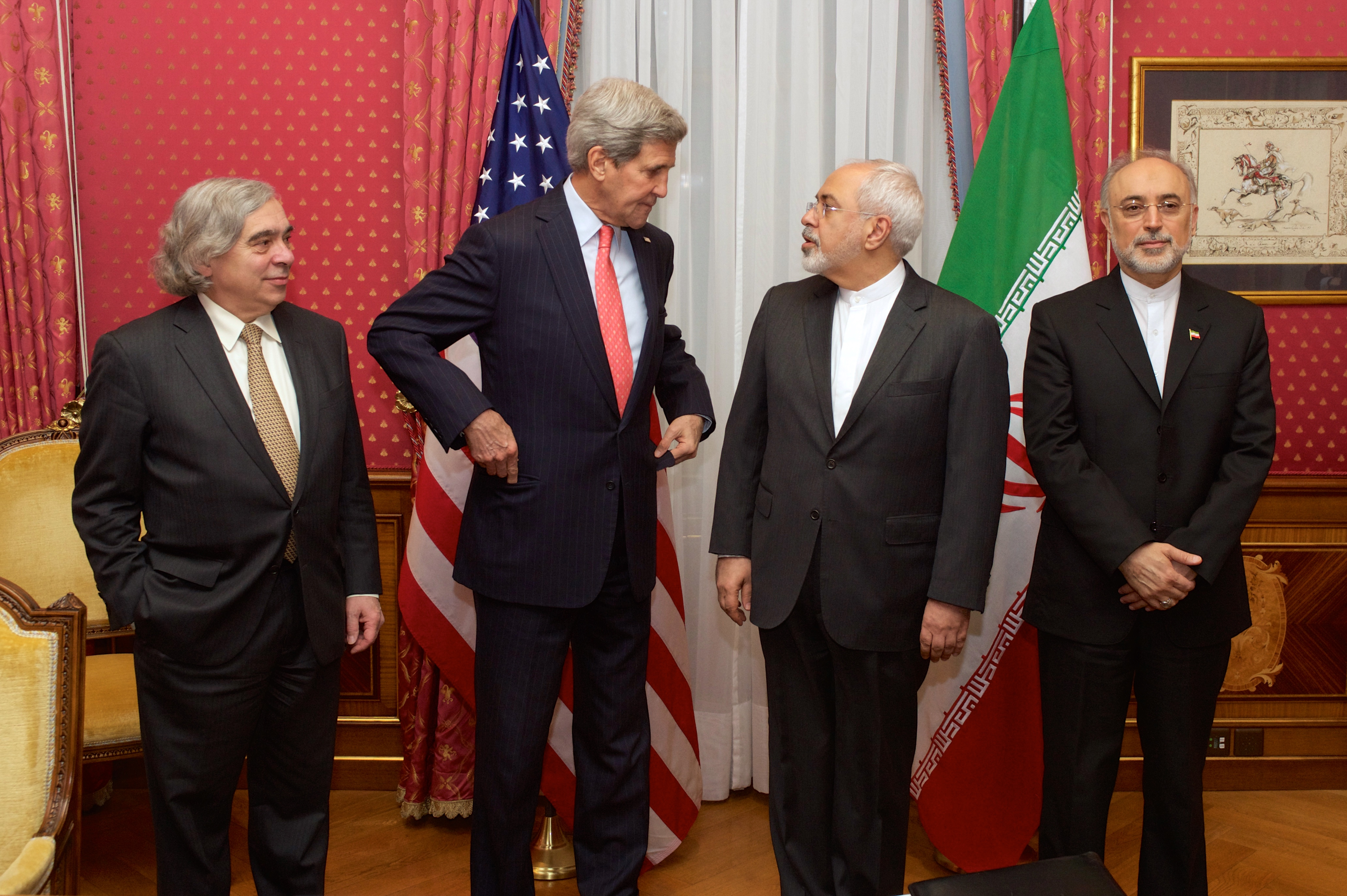
Ernest Moniz, John Kerry, Mohammad Javad Zarif and Ali Akbar Salehi in the "Salon Élysée" of the Beau-Rivage Palace (16 March 2015)

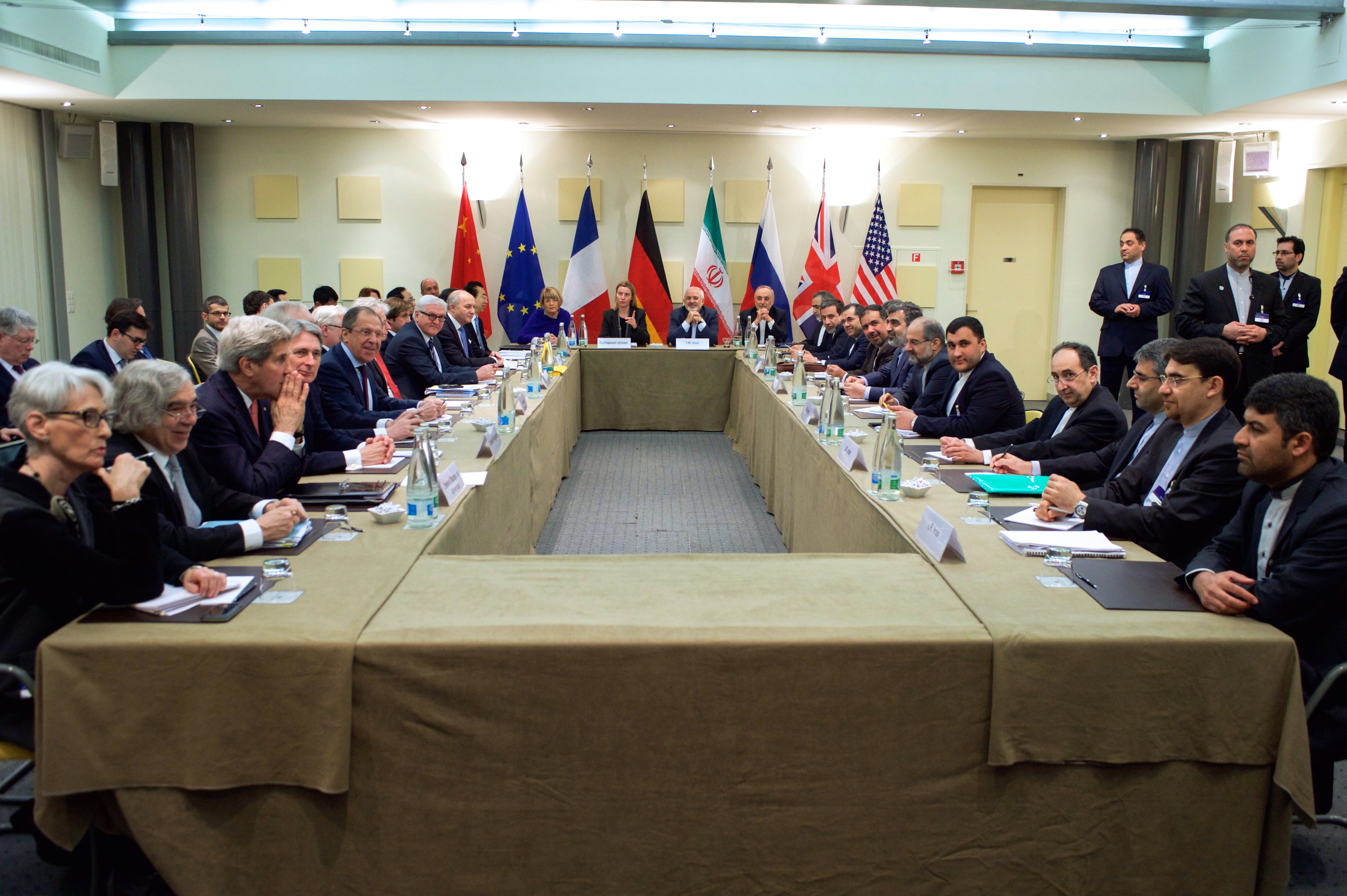
The ministers of foreign affairs of the United States, the United Kingdom, Russia, Germany, France, China, the European Union and Iran in the "Salle forum" (30 March 2015)

== Gallery ==
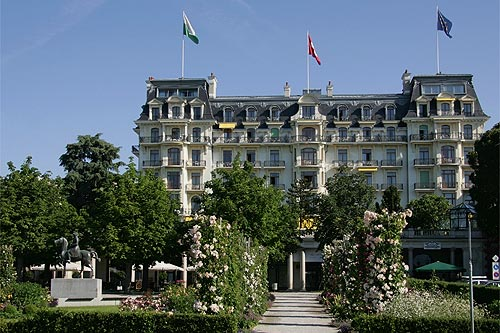
The west building

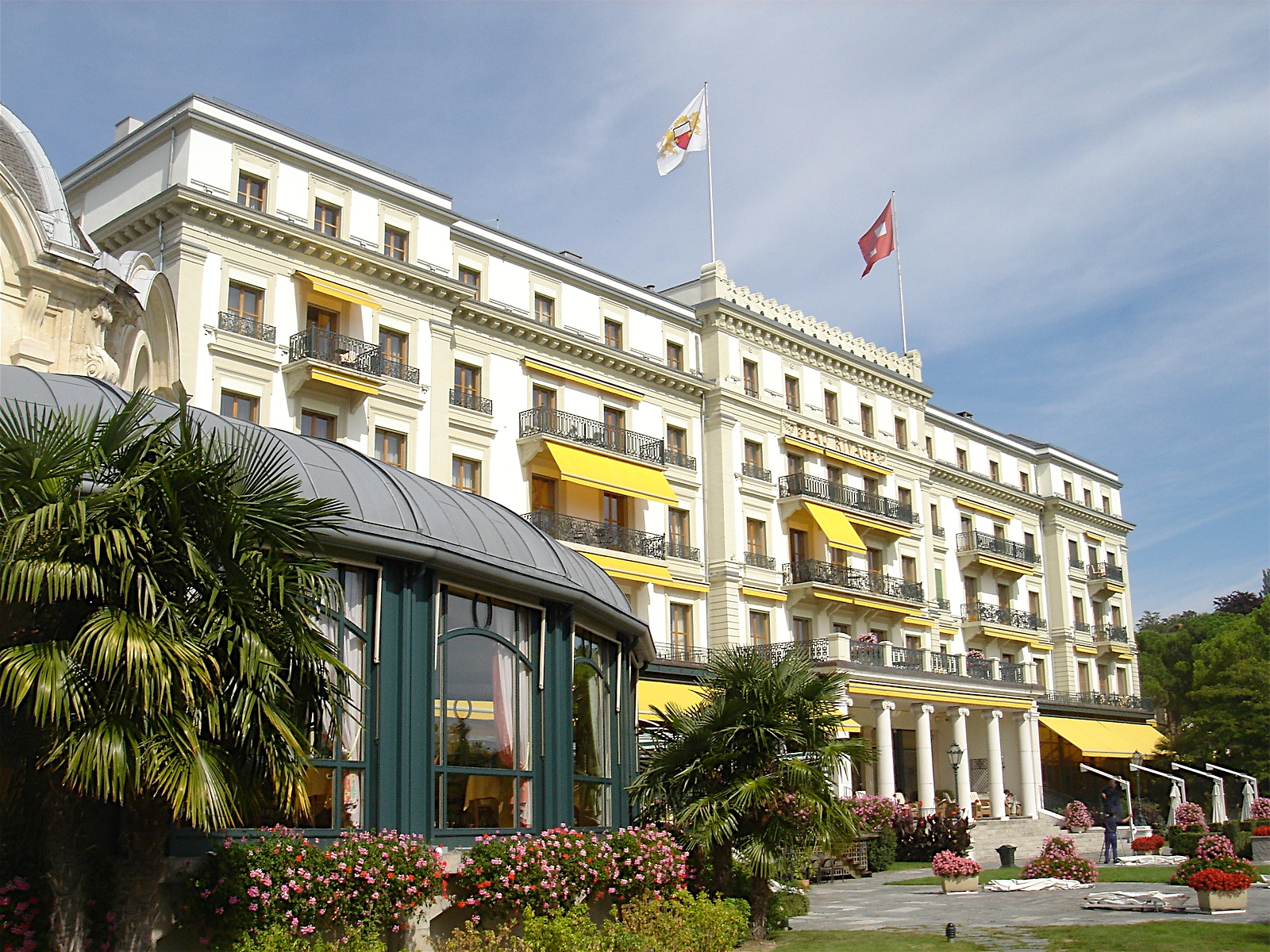
The east building

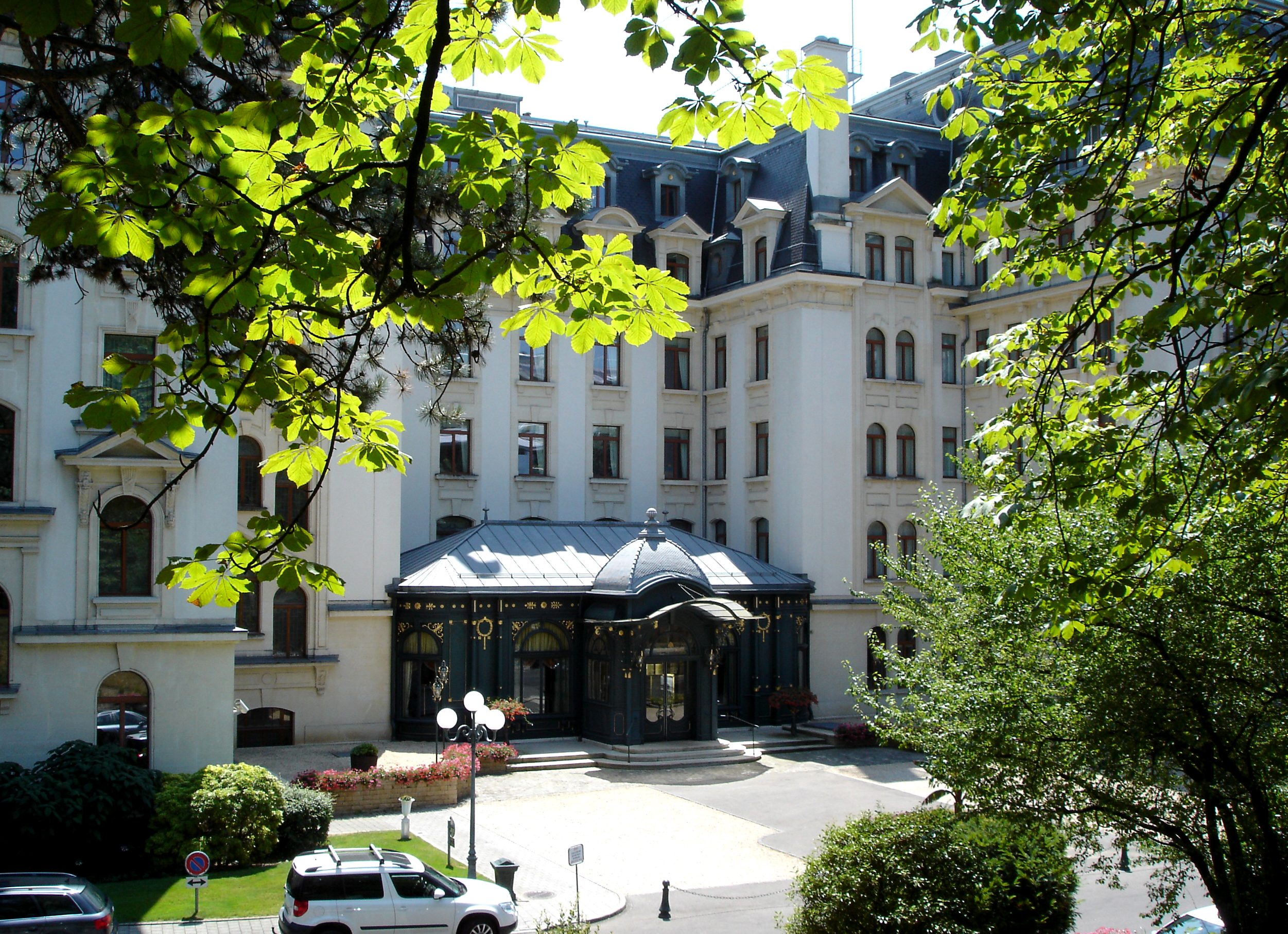
The north entrance

== See also ==
- List of cultural property of national significance in Switzerland: Vaud
- List of hotels in Switzerland
- Tourism in Switzerland
