= Sandor =

Sandor is a surname, and may refer to

- Akos Sandor (born 1977), Canadian weightlifter
- Aleksandar Popović Sandor (1847–1877), Serbian geologist
- Alfred Sandor (1918–1983), American actor
- Anna Sandor (1949–2025), Hungarian-born Canadian-American screenwriter
- Clementine von Metternich-Sandor (1870–1963), Austrian princess
- Ellen R. Sandor (born 1942), American artist
- George Sandor (born c.1944), Scottish fencer
- Gluck Sandor (1899–1978), American actor
- Ishtvan Shandor (born 1944), Ukrainian football player and coach
- Petre Șandor, Romanian sports shooter
- Richard L. Sandor, American businessman and economist
- Steve Sandor (1937–2017), American actor
- Velimir Šandor (born 1985), Croatian Paralympic athlete

== See also ==
- Sándor
