= Swiss Alcohol Board =

Coordinates: 46.9535°N 7.4316°E

The Swiss Alcohol Board (SAB) was a federal authority of the Swiss Confederation. It was integrated into the Federal Office for Customs and Border Security (FOCBS) in early 2018.

The SAB was responsible for the enforcement of the Swiss Alcohol Act, which governs the production and importation of spirits and ethanol, as well as trade in and advertising of spirits. The aim of this legislation was health protection (Art. 105 of the Swiss Federal Constitution). Fermented beverages, such as wine and beer, are not included in the scope of application of the Alcohol Act.

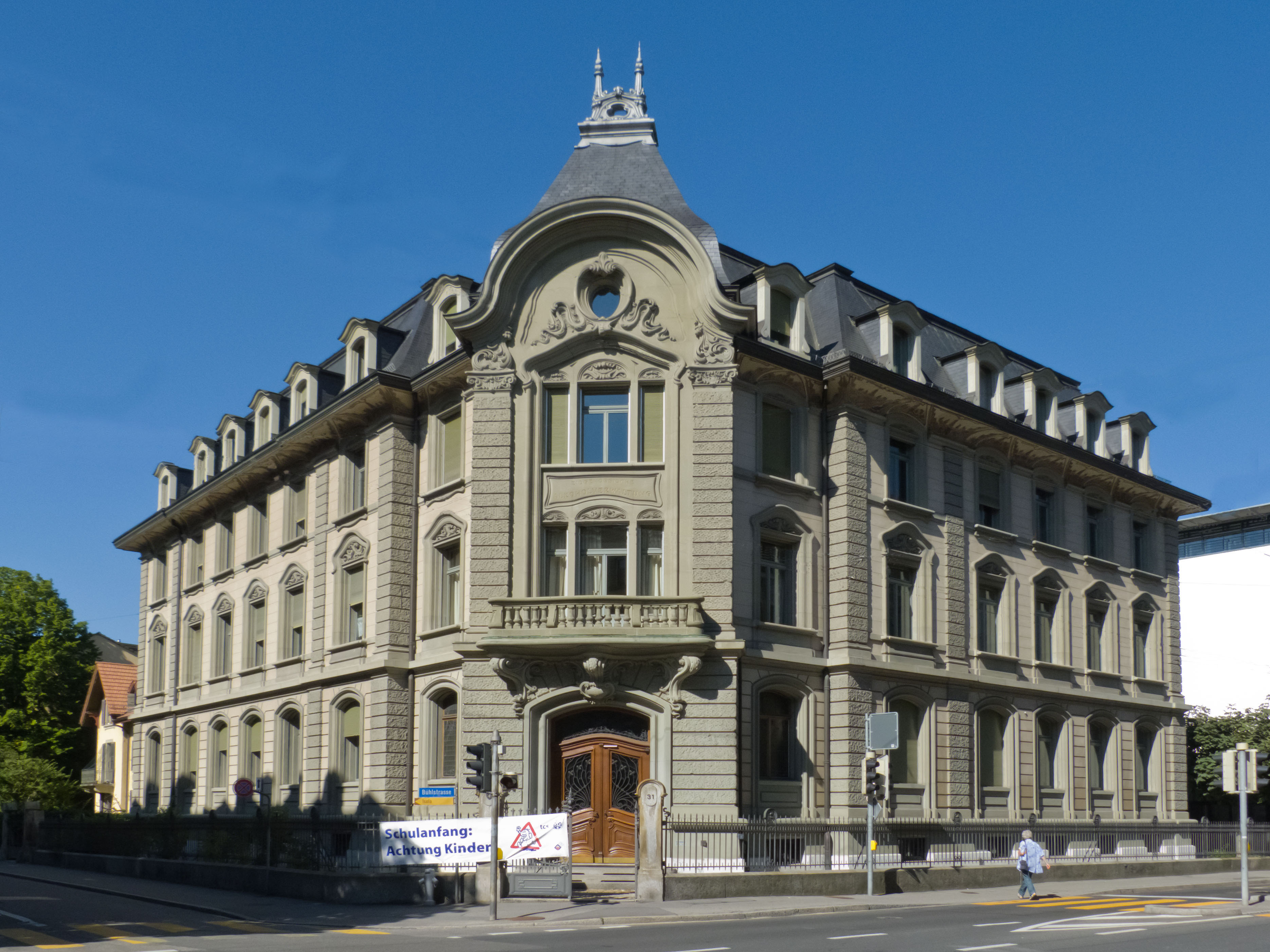
Headquarter of the Swiss Alcohol Board in Bern

== Aim and tasks ==
The SAB fulfilled tasks in the area of federal monopolies on the production of spirits and the production and importation of ethanol. Together with its partners in the cantons, it ensured compliance with the advertising and trade regulations applicable to spirits.

90% of its annual net profit of some CHF 260 million was allocated to AHV/IV financing and 10% to prevention projects (known as the "alcohol tenth").

=== Taxation of spirits ===
The SAB's core task was to levy consumption tax on spirits at a rate of CHF 29 per liter of pure alcohol. To do this, it monitored consistent market separation between spirits and ethanol for consumption purposes and ethanol for industrial purposes, which is tax-free.

=== Advertising provisions ===
In Switzerland, the Alcohol Act restricts spirit advertising to product-related content only, banning lifestyle portrayals and discounts. The Alcohol Sector (ALK) of the FOCBS assesses alcohol advertisement drafts for compliance. Fermented beverages like wine and beer are exempt from these regulations. Nonetheless, the Ordinance on Foodstuffs and Utility Articles—Articles 42 and 43—prohibits advertising aimed at individuals under 18, among other regulations, with enforcement and oversight delegated to the cantons.

=== Trade regulations ===
The SAB issues permits for wholesale trade. A cantonal retail permit must be requested for selling and serving spirits to end customers. The cantons are responsible for the enforcement of trade regulations (e.g. prohibition of happy hour offers). The SAB provides advice to them in this area.

=== Protection of minors ===
The ALK regulates alcohol trade and advertising to prevent problematic consumption. It imposes access restrictions, setting sales hours and age limits—16 for fermented drinks like beer, wine, and cider, and 18 for distilled spirits. The ALK also manages advertising, pricing, and taxation, ensuring legal compliance. Swiss law allows cantons and retailers to adopt stricter rules, such as in Ticino and some stores banning sales to those under 18. Enforcement depends on sales staff verifying customer ages with ID, aided by clear signage at sale points about age restrictions. The strategy encompasses taxation, production control, advertising limits, and age verification to mitigate alcohol risks.

A free online training course is offered to individuals involved in the supply or sale of alcohol, focusing on educating them about the relevant cantonal and federal legal provisions. Upon successful completion and passing of the associated test, participants are awarded a certificate.

Test purchases are aimed at increasing awareness among sales staff about the prohibition of alcohol sales to minors under 16 or 18 years. These tests, undertaken by both private and governmental organizations, help ensure adherence to alcohol sales regulations. The test purchasing guide, serving as a reference for Switzerland, offers guidelines to standardize test purchases across cantons, communes, cities, and NGOs, facilitating the comparison of collected data with other authorities' results. The www.tkdb.ch platform enables standardized data entry and questionnaire development for diverse target groups, extending to items like games or cigarettes, with security ensured through restricted user access.

=== Importation of ethanol ===
The tasks in the ethanol import monopoly area are performed by Alcosuisse. A profit centre with a performance mandate and global budget, it supplies Swiss businesses with some 40 million kilos of ethanol each year.

== Organisation ==
The SAB was founded in 1887 and is the Confederation's oldest institution. It has been a legal entity since 1900. The SAB is headquartered in Bern and runs two ethanol distribution centres in Schachen, Lucerne and Delémont, Jura. It performed inspections on a decentralised basis throughout Switzerland. The wide range of tasks performed by the SAB and its profit centre brought them into regular contact with over 135,000 companies, farms or individuals.

=== Restructuring (from 2008 onward) ===
Under the partial revision of the Alcohol Act, the SAB had to be dissolved as an institution with its own legal identity and incorporated into the Federal Office for Customs and Border Security (FOCBS).
