= Sandow Lakes Ranch =

Ranch in Texas, United States

The Sandow Lakes Ranch is a 33,800-acre ranch in Texas, U.S. It spans three counties, including Milam County, Texas, There are 14 lakes on the ranch and "48,379 acre feet of water" from the Carrizo-Wilcox Aquifer. It was acquired by Alcoa in the 1950s. In 2016, Alcoa listed it for US$250 million.
