= Sandow, Ladakh =

Sandow
- Village
- Location in Ladakh, India Sandow (India)
- Coordinates: 34.55°N 76.38°E
- Country: India
- Union Territory: Ladakh
- District: Kargil
- Tehsil: Shakar-Chiktan

Population (2011)
  - Total: 400
- Time zone: UTC+5:30 (IST)

Sandow is the highest village of Chiktan block, situated 60 kilometres (37 mi) away in the east of district headquarter Kargil, Ladakh. Sandow is surrounded by villages - Lamsoo in the west, Yokma Kharboo and Shakar in the south, and Lhalung Batalik in the north. Sandow falls under the Shakar constituency zone. The village is 58 kilometres (36 mi) from Kargil town, located at a latitude of 34.55 and longitude of 76.38 and at an altitude of 3,200 metres (10,500 ft) above mean sea level. The village was settled some around 300 years before, on a syncline of a complex range of Himalayas.

== Climate ==
Sandow has a very cool climate with the temperature dropping to −30 °C (−22 °F) in winter. Very cool normal wind makes life harsh there in winter. In summer temperature rises to 20. Three main seasons i.e. spring, autumn, and winter are very cold. In winter snowfall of over 1 foot will be there which is the main source of water for the summer. There is a large namely Shashi Lake 2 km above the village which stores snow water melted in spring and early summer to ensure continuous water supply for the whole summer.

=== Agriculture ===
Agriculture is very important and the main work of the villagers. Crops like Barley, wheat, and pea are cultivated. Agricultural work begins in mid-April and until August. There are canals to water fields as there used to be very less rainfall. Until a few years back all agricultural work like plowing, threshing, and grinding to flour used to be done by people with help of animals but now machines replaced grinding and threshing.

==== Topography ====
Sandow is in between mountains and is very rugged. Small agricultural fields are made in the mountains alongside the stream. The soil here is not productive, basically, the soil is very new, formed by degradation and erosion of mountains people have made the soil cultivable by feeding the soil with local manures whole village and field are on the slopes of mountains.

== Demographics ==
There are about 40 households in the villages and the population is roughly 400.

=== Education ===
There is a middle school in the village. The literacy rate of the village is above 80% and most of the students are pursuing their higher studies in various parts of India. A secondary school is located 10 kilometres (6.2 mi) away from the village in another village Shakar.

== Tourism ==
=== Shashi Tso ===
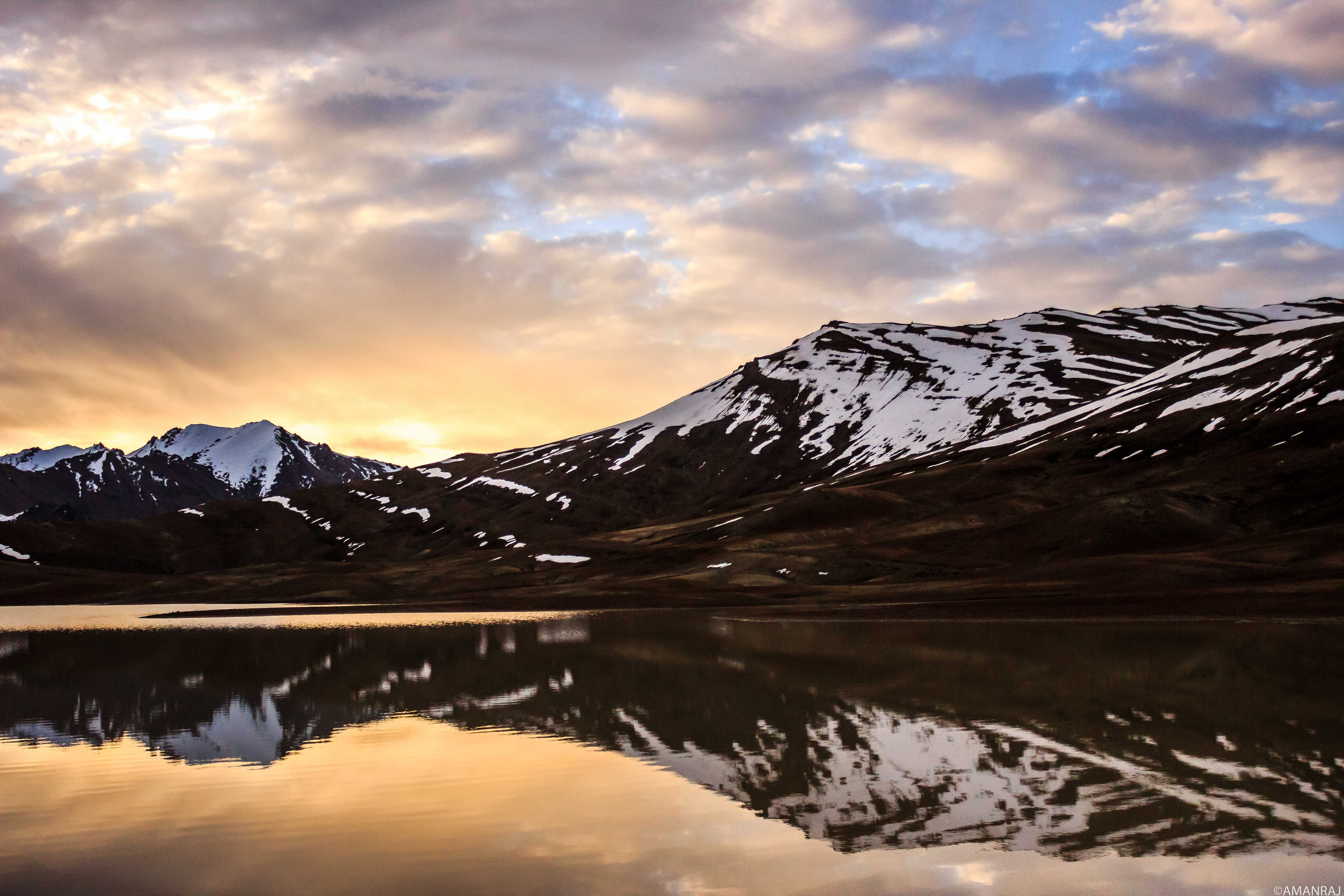

Shashi Lake (popularly known as Shashi Tso) is a lakes in Kargil district located 08 km from village Sandow. It is an artificial lake located in the upper mountain range of Shashi at an altitude of 4,200 meters (14,000 ft) surrounded by mountains on all sides. The lake is snow-fed so its volume changes with seasons reaching peak volume in June. The lake remains in a frozen state for half of the year. The lake is seasonal and it gets filled up in the months of May–June when the snow starts to melt in the surrounding mountains. It is known for its scenery, cool weather, fresh icy water, and adventures like kayaking and trekking. It is the base camp for trekking to Barbanchanla peak which is the highest peak of Shakar-Chiktan. The area surrounding the lake is grazing grounds for livestock of surrounding villagers and wild animals like foxes, deer, ibex, and wolves could be seen around the lake drinking water.

=== History ===
This lake was constructed about 60 years back by the villagers of the twin villages of Sandow and Yokma Kharboo with the purpose of permanent water source for the agricultural land in the two villages which lie along the stream originating from the lake. A wall was constructed on the lower side of the lake to stop the water and a regulatory water gateway was made to allow water to flow in case overfilled. A required amount of water leaks from the base of the wall which makes it independent, requiring no human to regulate the flowing water level from the lake. The wall was constructed with a slope varying from 40 degrees at the bottom to 60 degrees at the top and one can easily walk even on the slanting wall of the lake.

=== Excursions and tourism ===
The Lake is connected by road to Sandow and can be reached by road from Kargil. Through Sandow, it is connected to the National highway (NH1) at Khangral and Lotsum. It is 65 km from the district headquarters in Kargil and 200 km from Leh.
