= Édouard-Marcel Sandoz =

Edouard-Marcel Sandoz (21 March 1881 – 20 March 1971) was a Swiss animalier sculptor and painter.

== Biography ==
Sandoz was a son of the entrepreneur Édouard Constant Sandoz, the co-founder of the chemical and later pharmaceutical company Sandoz, and the brother of the author Maurice-Yves Sandoz. In 1923 he joined the board of directors of Sandoz; in 1941 he took over the position of CEO of the company in France. After his father's death in 1928, Edouard Marcel inherited his country estate Le Denantou in Lausanne, which he transformed into a workshop. In the 1920s he developed a light projection technique for theatre stages. In 1935 he was one of the founding partners of the photographic paper manufacturer Tellko S.A. in Freiburg.

He studied from 1900 to 1903 at the Haute école d'arts appliqués de Genève and from 1904 to 1907 at the École des Beaux-Arts in Paris with the sculptors Antonin Mercié and Jean-Antoine Injalbert. In 1909, he married Adèle Passavant, with whom he settled in the Montparnasse district of Paris in 1910.

Sandoz created almost 1800 sculptures and over 200 porcelain models. In addition to creating human figures, he mainly worked as an animal sculptor, making his objects from materials such as stone, onyx, porcelain, semi-precious stones, bronze and precious metals. He participated in numerous exhibitions, including the 1906 salon of the Société nationale des beaux-arts and the 1911 salon of the Société des artistes décorateurs. During the First World War, he turned to ceramics and designed models for the porcelain manufacturers Haviland & Co. (Limoges), Sèvres, and Langenthal. He made numerous small figures, some in Art Nouveau, others borrowed from Cubism, and others as Art Deco statuettes. His metal figures were mostly handcrafted by the Susse Frères foundry.

As a painter, he mainly depicted flowers and landscapes. In 1921 he travelled to North Africa and painted watercolors for folding brochures. In 1933 he founded the Société française des animaliers (French Society of Animal Sculptors). He showed his works in the pavilion of the Société des artistes décorateurs at the World Exhibition Paris 1937. In 1947 he was elected a member of the Paris Académie des Beaux-Arts. The University of Lausanne awarded him an honorary doctorate in geology and botany in 1959. He was appointed Commander of the Legion of Honour and Commander of the Ordre des Arts et des Lettres.

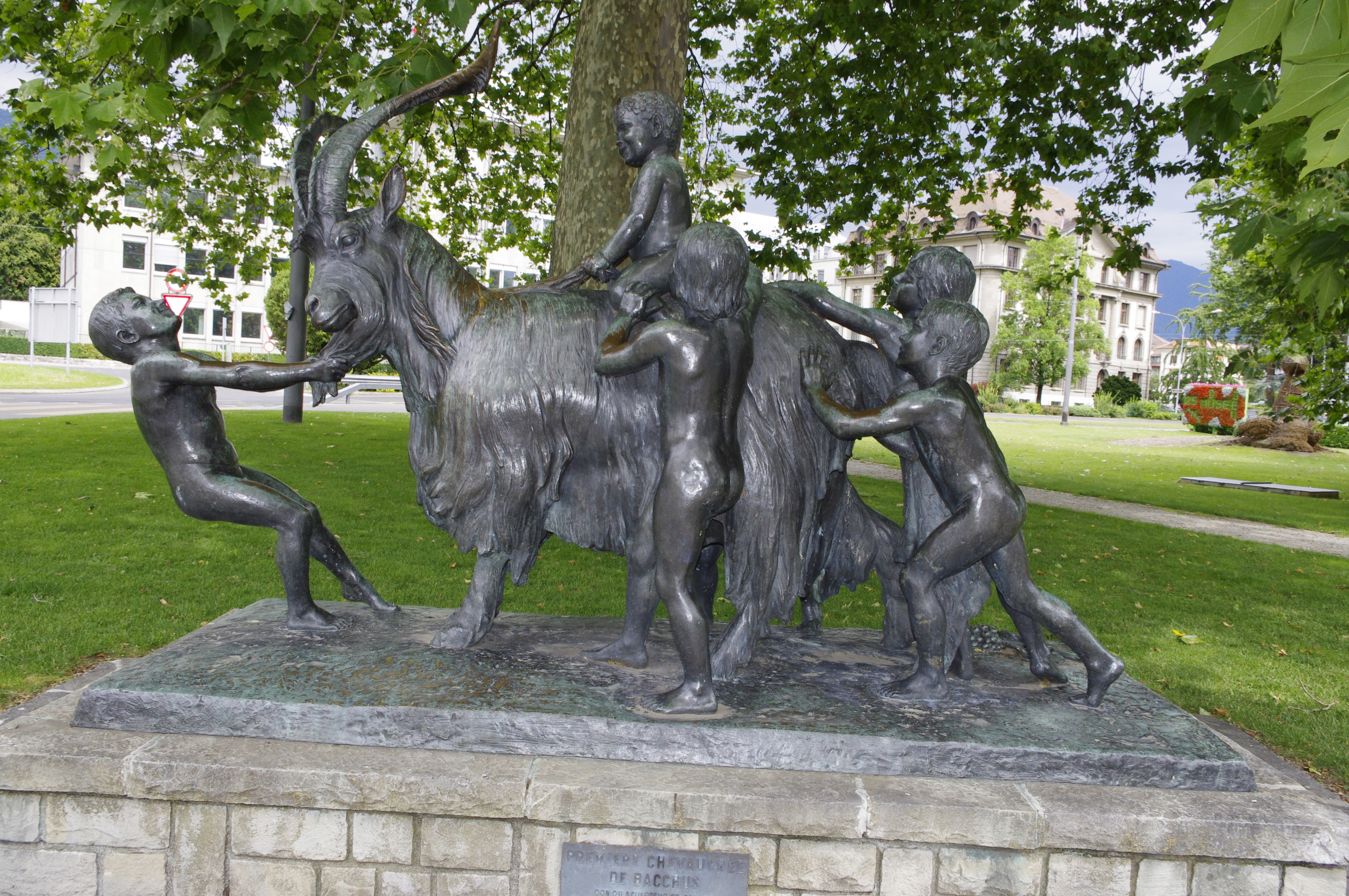
La première chevauchée de Bacchus, Vevey

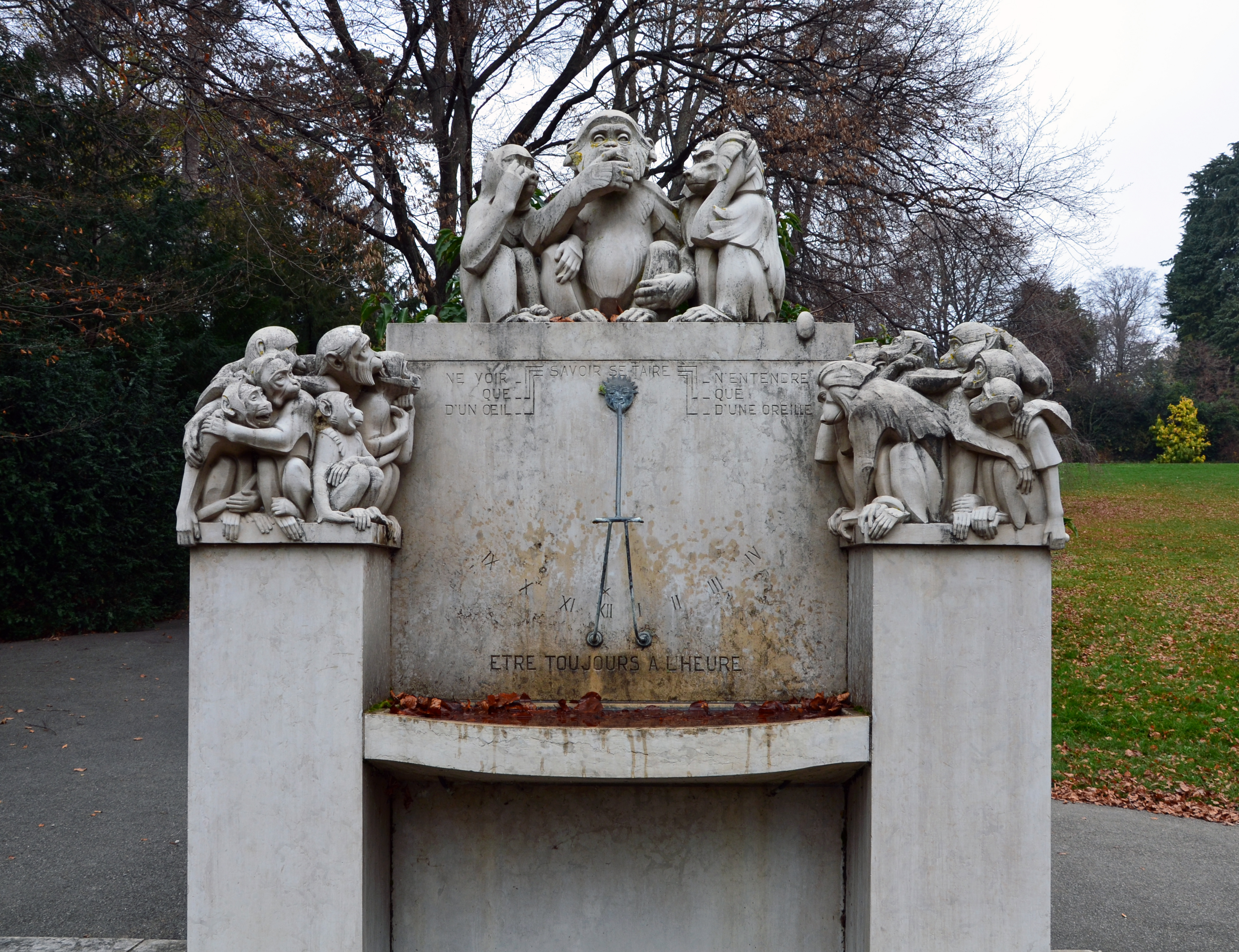
La Fontaine aux Singes, parc du Denantou, Lausanne

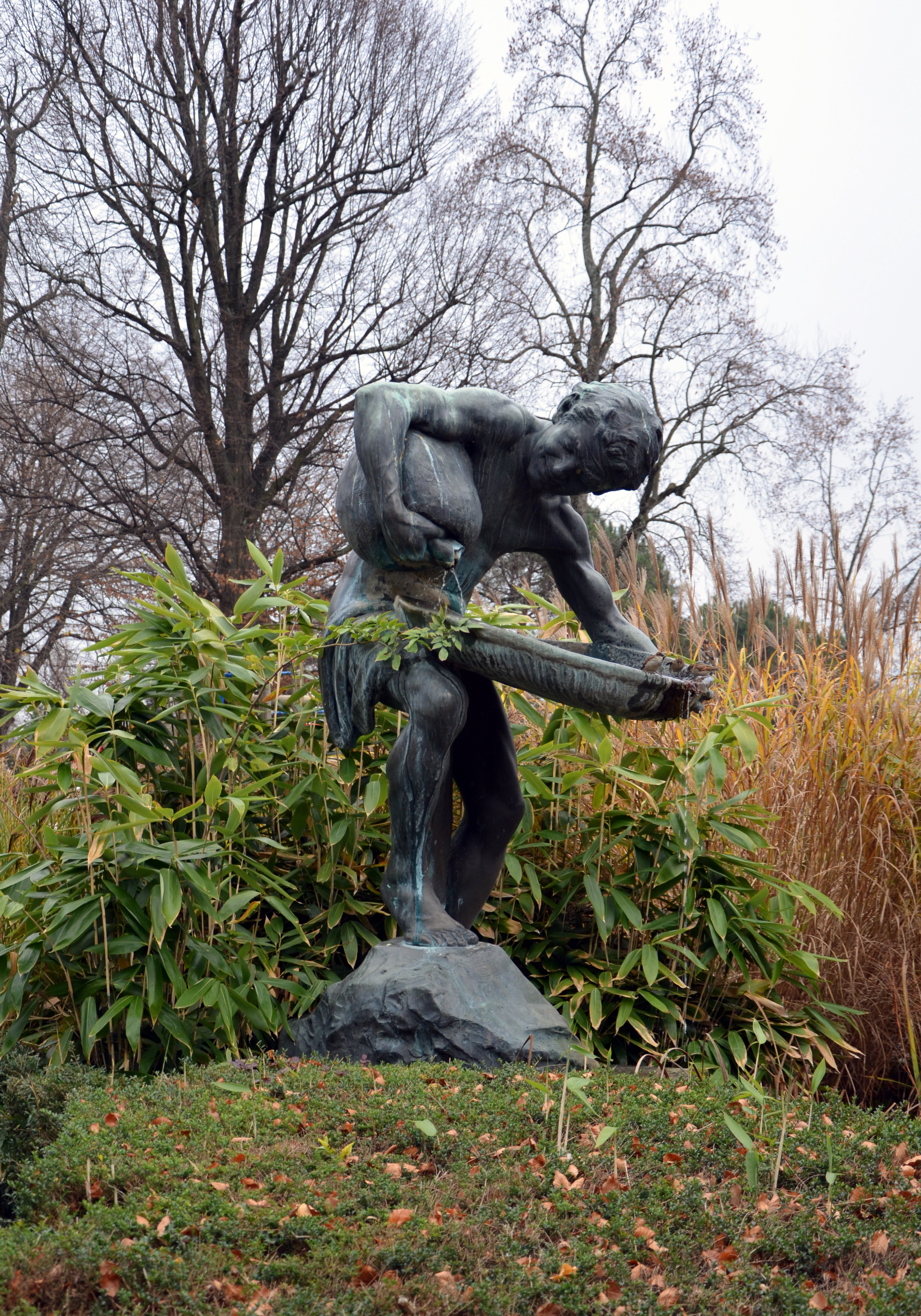
Le Faune, parc du Denantou, Lausanne

== Awards ==
- Commandeur of the Légion d'honneur,
- Commandeur of the Ordre des Arts et des Lettres.

== Bibliography ==
- Félix Marcilhac, Edouard Marcel Sandoz: sculpteur, figuriste et animalier, 1881-1971, Editions de l'amateur, 1993.

== See also ==
- Sandoz Family Foundation
