= Sandoz Family Foundation =

Swiss philanthropic organization

The Sandoz Family Foundation, created in 1964, is a private Swiss foundation.

== Description ==
The foundation was created by sculptor Édouard-Marcel Sandoz, son of Édouard Constant Sandoz, founder in 1866 of the Basel-based company Sandoz, now Novartis. Its purpose is to engage in charitable activities in various fields of education and training, higher education and research, as well as in cultural and social activities.

The foundation operates mainly in Switzerland in several fields, including support and encouragement of artistic culture with the Fondation Edouard et Maurice Sandoz (FEMS), and economically in the watchmaking sector with the support of Parmigiani Fleurier and Vaucher Manufacture in Fleurier, as well as in the hotel business with six hotels: one in Neuchâtel, one in Zermatt, and four in Lausanne, including the Beau-Rivage Palace, the Lausanne Palace, and the Château d'Ouchy.

The foundation also participates in the financing and support of the pharmaceutical industry with Novartis, in the graphic arts and printing sector with the graphic arts company Genoud in Mont sur Lausanne, PCL Presses Centrales in Renens, Imprimerie Cornaz in Yverdon-les-Bains, Musumeci in Aosta (Italy), and in technology and communication with Interoute. The foundation indicates that its investment policy is oriented towards technological innovation and sustainable development.

In 1965, the Sandoz Family Foundation made a substantial equity investment in hedge fund administrator Citco.

== Edouard and Maurice Sandoz Foundation Award ==
The FEMS Prize, a grant of 100,000 Swiss francs, has been awarded every year since 1996 to an artist whose creative project has been selected by a jury. The scholarship is awarded alternately to a project in the field of sculpture, literature, music and painting.
