= Sport in Switzerland =

Sporting activity in Switzerland

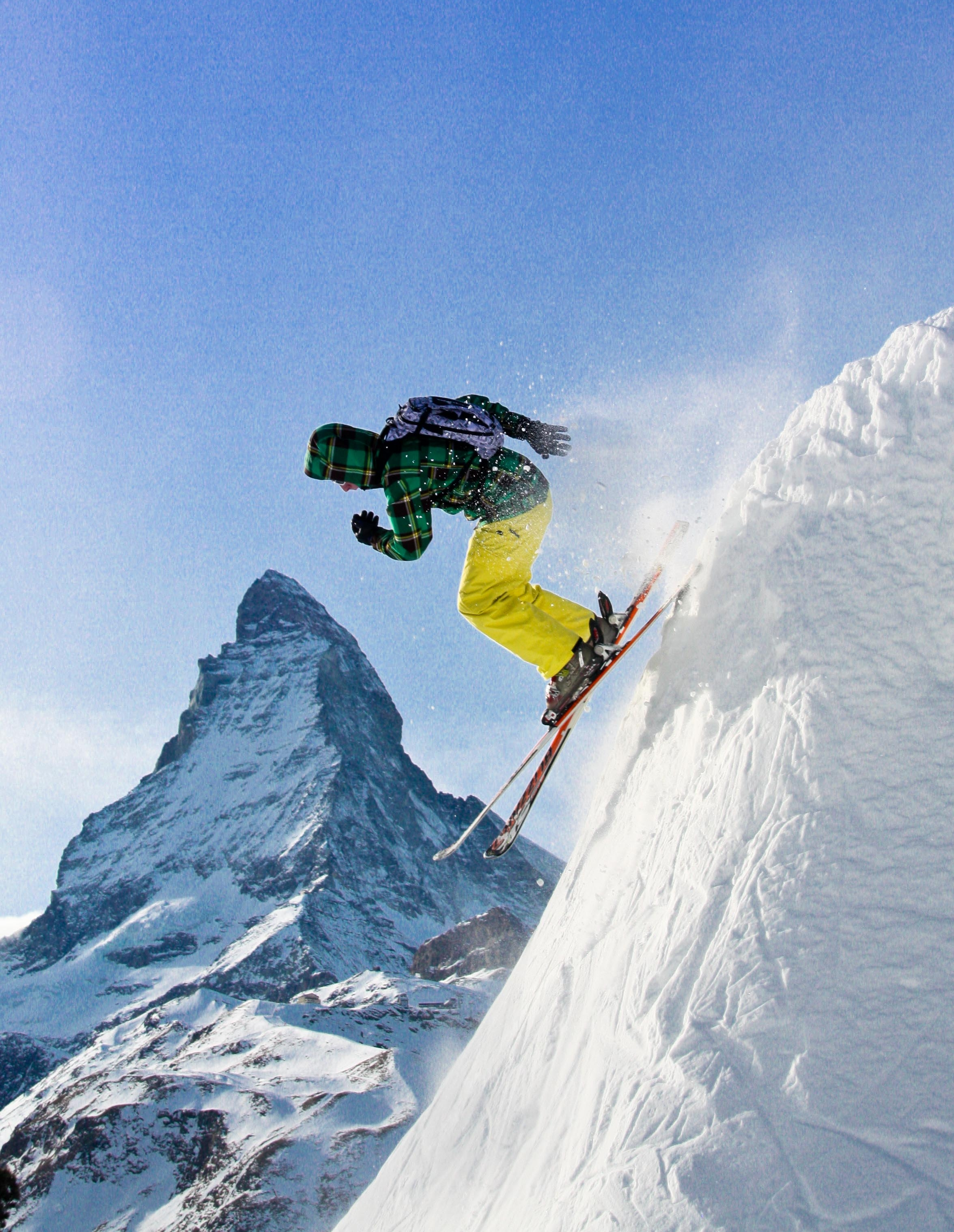
Skiing in Zermatt. Switzerland is the first country where winter sports were developed on a large scale.

In Switzerland, most of the people have a regular sport activity and one in four is an active member of a sports club. The most important all-embracing organisations for sports in Switzerland are the Federal Office of Sport, and the Swiss Olympic Committee (Swiss Olympic).

Because of its varied landscape and climate, Switzerland offers a large variety of sports to its inhabitants and visitors. While winter sports are enjoyed throughout the country, football and ice hockey remain the most popular sports.

Major sporting events in Switzerland include the Olympic Games, which were held two times in St. Moritz in Winter 1928 and Winter 1948, and, the 1954 FIFA World Cup, the UEFA Euro 2008 in Switzerland and Austria. Having been a mainstay of the Formula One World Championship in its formative years from 1950 to 1954, the country banned motorsport in the wake of the 1955 Le Mans disaster relaxing the ban for electric motorsports in 2018 with parliamentary agreement to repeal this ban reached in May 2022 and set to take effect no later than 1 July 2026, ending the 71 year motorsport ban officially. Swiss people are among the most physically active in Europe. As of 2026, the favorite sports of the Swiss remain hiking (practiced by 49% of the population), cycling (34%), swimming (25%), skiing (23%), and jogging (23%). However, these have lost popularity in recent years to weight training (20%) and yoga (16%).

== Winter sports ==
Skiing and mountaineering are much practiced by Swiss people and foreigners, the highest summits attract mountaineers from around the world.

As a predominantly mountainous country Switzerland has traditionally been one of the strongest nations in the sport of alpine skiing, where it has a long-running rivalry with neighboring Austria. The Swiss reached their peak in the sport in the 1980s, when they won the overall Nations' Cup in the FIS Alpine Ski World Cup for seven consecutive years from 1981 to 1987. Switzerland's most successful alpine skiers include Pirmin Zurbriggen, Peter Müller, Bernhard Russi, Didier Cuche, Franz Heinzer, Michael von Grünigen, Carlo Janka, Beat Feuz and Marco Odermatt among the men and Vreni Schneider, Erika Hess, Michela Figini, Maria Walliser, Marie Therese Nadig, Sonja Nef, Lise-Marie Morerod, Brigitte Oertli, Lara Gut-Behrami, Corinne Suter and Wendy Holdener among the women.

Switzerland is also notable as the birthplace of competitive sledding, which originated in the Swiss resort of St. Moritz, which was also where the first bobsleigh was constructed in the late nineteenth century. Switzerland has traditionally been a strong nation in bobsleigh, enjoying a particularly fierce rivalry with East Germany in the 1970s and 1980s.

Simon Ammann has been one of the world's best ski jumpers in the 21st century, whilst Dario Cologna has emerged as one of the top cross-country skiers in the world in the late 2000s.

Curling has been a very popular winter sport for more than 30 years. The Swiss teams have won 3 World Men's Curling Championships and 2 Women's titles. The Swiss men's team skipped by Dominic Andres won a gold medal at 1998 Nagano Winter Olympics.

Stéphane Lambiel, two-time winner of the World Figure Skating Championships amongst numerous other domestic and international competitions, is one of the world's top figure skaters.

Bandy exists in minor form. In September 2017 Switzerland made its debut at the annual rink bandy tournament in Nymburk, Czech Republic. At the 2018 Women's Bandy World Championship, Switzerland will participate.

=== Ice hockey ===
Most Swiss people follow ice hockey and support one of the 14 teams of the National League which, as of 2023, is the most-attended European ice hockey league.

In April–May 2009, Switzerland hosted the Ice Hockey World Championships for the 10th time. The Swiss national ice hockey team's latest achievements are three silver medals at the 2013 World Ice Hockey Championships, 2018 World Ice Hockey Championships and 2024 World Ice Hockey Championships. The "Nati" is currently ranked 5th in the IIHF World Ranking.

== Football ==
Like many other Europeans, most Swiss are fans of association football and the national team or 'Nati' is widely supported. The national team has previously participated at thirteen different FIFA World Cups (last in 2026) and six different UEFA European Championships (last in 2024 and including as co-host with Austria in 2008).

At club level Grasshopper Club Zürich holds the records for winning the most national championship titles (27) and the most Swiss Cup trophies (19). More recently FC Basel enjoyed great success on a national (winning 11 championship titles from 2003 to 2017) and international level (qualifying eight times for the UEFA Champions League group stage; their first appearance was in 2002).

== Basketball ==
Clint Capela has been the highest paid team athlete in Switzerland's history.

Mies in Switzerland is home to the headquarters of FIBA, the world's governing agency for international events. Unsurprisingly, the country is one of FIBA's founding members and therefore has one of the world's longest basketball traditions.

Once a major team at the international scene, its national team does not have major international significance anymore, despite occasional strong showings at qualification games.

There have been four Swiss-born NBA players: Thabo Sefolosha, Enes Kanter Freedom, Nikola Vučević and Clint Capela.

== Tennis ==
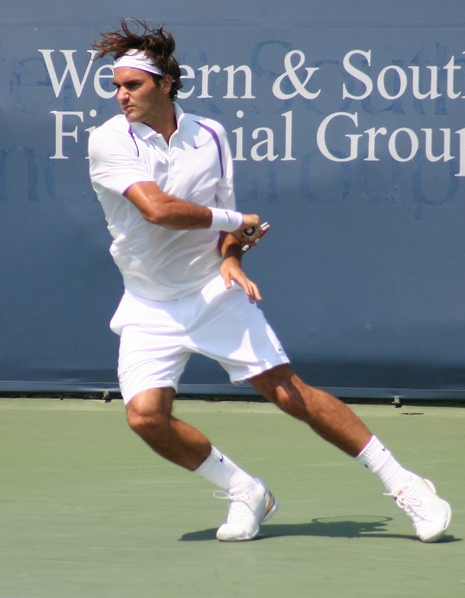
Roger Federer is widely considered to be one of "the best male player in the history of tennis".

Over the last few decades, Swiss tennis players Roger Federer, Stan Wawrinka and Martina Hingis have been at the top of tennis. Federer, Wawrinka and Hingis all have Grand Slam singles titles to their names. Federer won 20 Grand Slam titles and holds the record for the longest consecutive stay as the world number 1 at 237 weeks. Federer won a record 8 Wimbledon titles overall and also won the Australian Open 6 times, the US Open 5 times and the French Open once. Another Swiss tennis figure is Marc Rosset, winning the singles gold medal at the 1992 Olympics. Federer and Wawrinka teamed up at the 2008 Olympics to win the doubles gold medal, and Switzerland also won the 2014 Davis Cup.

Switzerland also hosts 3 ATP tournaments. The Swiss Indoors takes place in Basel at the St. Jakobshalle and is an ATP 500 event that holds a prominent position in the European indoor hard court swing in autumn. Federer won it a record 10 times. Other tournaments include the Swiss Open that takes place in Gstaad and the Geneva Open. Both tournaments take place on clay.

== Motorsport ==
Motorsport road racing circuits and events were banned in Switzerland following the 1955 Le Mans disaster with the exception of events held in a time trial format such as hillclimbing. On June 6, 2007, an amendment to lift the ban was passed by the lower house of the Swiss parliament. However the proposed law failed to pass the upper house, and was withdrawn in 2009 after being rejected twice. In 2015 the Swiss government allowed a relaxation of the law, permitting head-to-head racing for electric vehicles only. In June 2018 Switzerland hosted its first motor race in 63 years when the first Zürich ePrix was held as a round of the all-electric Formula E championship.

However, after a law passed in May 2022, Swiss Motorsport as a whole will be legalised on June 1 2026, by the revision of the Road Traffic Act, specifically repealing Article 52, the Article that banned Motorsport in Switzerland for 71 years.

Despite the long-standing restrictions, the country has produced successful road racing drivers such as Clay Regazzoni, Jo Siffert and successful World Touring Car Championship driver Alain Menu. Switzerland also won the A1GP World Cup of Motorsport in 2007-08 with driver Neel Jani. Swiss racing driver Marcel Fässler won the World Endurance Championship in 2012 and has won the Le Mans 24 Hours three times, and motorcycle racer Thomas Lüthi won the 2005 MotoGP World Championship in the 125cc category. Urs Erbacher is a six time FIA European Drag Racing champion. Also, Formula One constructor Sauber is based in Switzerland. In recent years, drivers such as Romain Grosjean and Sébastien Buemi have been successful in Formula One, Formula E, WEC and Le Mans.

However, other forms of motorsport are permitted, such as rallying, motocross, supermotard, enduro and trials.

High-profile drivers from Formula One and World Rally Championship such as Michael Schumacher, Nick Heidfeld, Kimi Räikkönen, Fernando Alonso, Lewis Hamilton, Sébastien Loeb and Sebastian Vettel all have a residence in Switzerland, sometimes for tax purposes.

== Other sports ==
Switzerland is also the home of the sailing team Alinghi which won the America's Cup in 2003 and defended the title in 2007. Golf is becoming increasingly popular, with already more than 35 courses available and more in planning. André Bossert is a successful Swiss professional golfer.

The Switzerland national beach football team won the Euro Beach football Cup in 2005 and were runners-up twice, in 2008 Euro Beach football Cup and 2009 Euro Beach football Cup. More recently, they were also runners-up in the 2009 FIFA Beach football World Cup that took place in November.

The Switzerland women's national floorball team has become world champion once, in 2005, and taken medals in most other tournaments. The national team for men has taken eight medals in twelve tournaments.

Other sports where the Swiss have been successful include athletics, (Werner Günthör and Markus Ryffel), fencing, (Marcel Fischer), cycling, (Fabian Cancellara, Ferdinand Kübler, Hugo Koblet, Oscar Egg, Jolanda Neff, Stefan Küng), kickboxing (Andy Hug), whitewater slalom (Ronnie Dürrenmatt—canoe, Mathias Röthenmund—kayak), beach volleyball (Sascha Heyer, Markus Egger, Paul and Martin Laciga), professional wrestling (Claudio Castagnoli), and triathlon (Brigitte McMahon, Reto Hug, Sven Riederer, Nicola Spirig, Daniela Ryf).

In cycling, Fabian Cancellara nicknamed 'Spartacus' is one of the best road racer of modern times. He has achieved great success in the classics; he has won Paris–Roubaix three times, the Milan – San Remo once, and the Tour of Flanders three times. Cancellara has won the opening stage of the Tour de France five times and has led the race for 28 days total, which is the most of any rider who has not won the Tour. His success has not been limited to just time trials and classics, as he has won general classification of the Tirreno–Adriatico, Tour de Suisse, and the Tour of Oman. In 2008, he won gold in the individual time trial and silver in the men's road race at the Summer Olympics. In 2016, at the Summer Olympics, he won in his last race of his career gold in the individual time trial. In addition, Cancellara has been the time trial world champion four times in his career.

Switzerland is the third most successful orienteering country in history.

The Swiss national lacrosse team has qualified for the World Lacrosse Championship three consequtive times (2010–2018). At the most recent event (2018), it finished 20th out of 46.

Netball has expanded significantly in Switzerland since the establishment of Swiss Netball in 2009. The country now runs club and school competitions, a national league, and a full development pathway from junior to senior level. Switzerland competes annually in Europe Netball tournaments, with the U17 national team winning the Netball Europe Challenge Cup in several years and the senior team achieving a highest world ranking of 28th, and a current ranking of 48th.

== Local sports ==
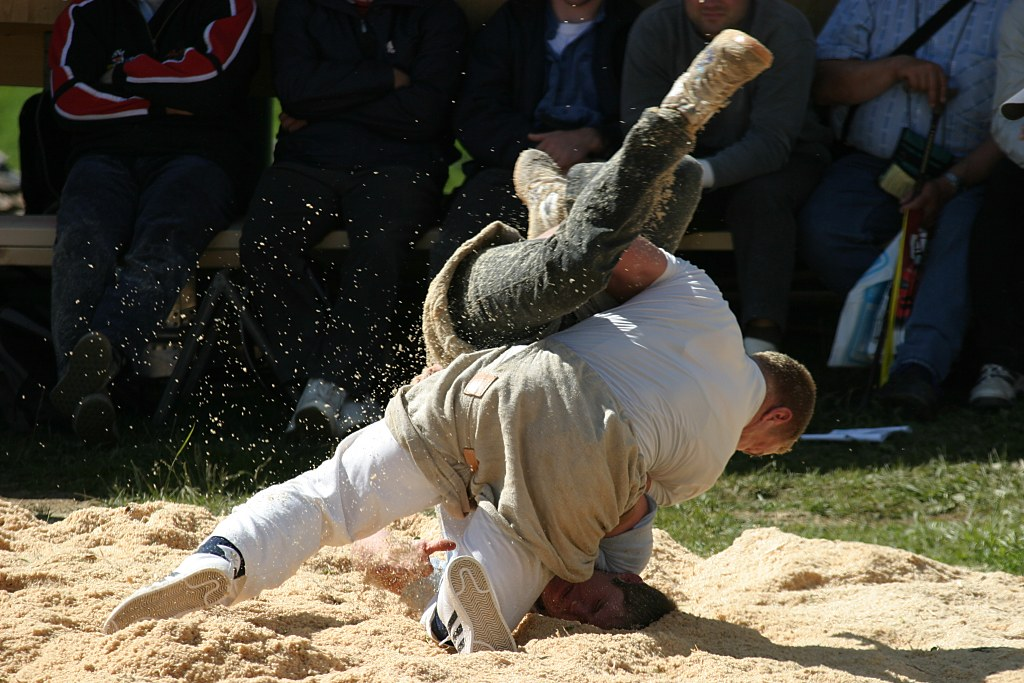
Traditional wrestling

Traditional sports include Swiss wrestling or "Schwingen". It is an old tradition from the rural central cantons and considered the national sport by some. Hornussen is another indigenous Swiss sport, which is like a cross between baseball and golf. Steinstossen is the Swiss variant of stone put, a competition in throwing a heavy stone. Practiced only among the alpine population since prehistoric times, it is recorded to have taken place in Basel in the 13th century. It is also central to the Unspunnenfest, first held in 1805, with its symbol the 83.5 kg stone named Unspunnenstein.

== Government ==
See: Federal Department of Defence, Civil Protection and Sports

== Events ==
- Lauberhorn ski races
- Patrouille des Glaciers
- Weltklasse Zürich
- Athletissima
- Davidoff Swiss Indoors
- Allianz Suisse Open Gstaad
- Swiss Cup
- Spengler Cup
- Tour de Suisse
- Tour de Romandie
- Omega European Masters

== See also ==
- Swiss Sports Personality of the Year
- Switzerland at the Olympics
- Football in Switzerland
- Switzerland men's national ice hockey team
- Roger Federer
- Martina Hingis
- Thabo Sefolosha, the first Swiss NBA player
- Antonio Cesaro
