= Swiss national sports =

Three traditional Swiss sports: Schwingen, Steinstossen, and Hornussen

The Swiss national sports (German: Nationalspiele der Schweiz; French: jeux nationaux) are three traditional sports of Switzerland: Schwingen (Swiss wrestling), Steinstossen (stone throwing), and—in a broader sense—Hornussen. Swiss wrestling and stone throwing were included in the program of the 1855 Federal Gymnastics Festival in Lausanne under the heading of "national gymnastics" (Nationalturnen), in contrast to the German gymnastics codified by Friedrich Ludwig Jahn; these indigenous disciplines were considered particularly suited to the Swiss people.

== Origins ==
All three disciplines go back to late-medieval contests, most often held in connection with church dedications, shooting festivals, or other popular occasions such as the ascent to the Alpine pastures or midsummer celebrations. A kind of pentathlon contested by young herdsmen, as posited by Hans Georg Wackernagel, cannot be confirmed. The contests often described as "Old Confederate" nevertheless remained popular above all in the Alpine regions. In the 17th and 18th centuries, the practice of Swiss wrestling and Hornussen retreated to the Entlebuch, the Emmental, and the Haslital.

In the wake of the patriotic revival movement of the Helvetic and Mediation periods, the Unspunnen festivals of 1805 and 1808 were a first attempt to give these "shepherds' games" supra-regional resonance. But only in the second half of the 19th century did they—above all Swiss wrestling—gain a broader following. The wrestling manual published in 1864 by the Bernese physician Rudolf Schärer made the combat sport known among gymnasts. The success of the federal wrestling festivals (usually combined with yodeling and alphorn performances and held with the participation of associations for Swiss costume) led to the founding of the Federal Swiss Wrestling Association (Eidgenössischer Schwingerverband, ESV) in 1895. The Hornusser federated nationally in 1902 as the Eidgenössischer Hornusserverband (EHV), and since 1907 the two associations have published a common organ, the Eidgenössische Schwinger-, Hornusser- und Jodlerzeitung. The continued success of the two sports federations (around 5,100 active members for the ESV and 8,000 for the EHV in 2005) is largely explained by the close intertwining of athletic and traditional elements in these two disciplines.

== Swiss wrestling ==
The German phrase Ringen und Schwingen, frequently encountered from the Reformation onward, indicates that the old Confederacy distinguished between two forms of wrestling. The grip on the opponent's clothing typical of Schwingen already appears in illustrations of the 13th century, but the "trouser-grip wrestling" specific to Alpine shepherd culture is attested only from around 1600. Numerous official ordinances and bans testify to annual meetings, usually on an Alpine pasture, where representatives of different communities faced one another. These mountain wrestling festivals (Bergschwinget) often coincided with the corresponding Alpine festival (Älplerchilbi). They were particularly frequent in the Haslital and the Entlebuch, on the Alpe Seewen, the Axalp, the Engstlenalp, the Balisalp, and on the Brünig Pass. Wrestling sites along the Bernese–Fribourg border show that the sport—known in the French-speaking part of the country as lutte or lutte suisse—also extended into part of Romandy.

In 18th-century travel accounts, Swiss wrestling already appears as a stereotypical example of an ancestral Alpine custom. Numerous prints depict, often with exaggeration, peaceful wrestlers surrounded by spectators in folk costume, set against idyllic landscapes. In his studies of the Entlebuch (the region where he was parish priest), Franz Josef Stalder gave in 1797 a detailed description and historical overview of the discipline. The fixed rules he proposed appear not to have been the only ones, however; other sources show that instead of the short overtrousers used today, wrestlers also used a mower's belt or a cloth tied around the thigh. The duration of an individual bout, called a Gang, was likewise not uniformly regulated.

Under the rules in force since the founding of the Federal Swiss Wrestling Association, a bout lasts ten to twelve minutes. The winner must throw the opponent to the ground with both shoulder blades touching the floor, without releasing the grip on the trousers. A panel of judges scores the participants' performances by a points system and determines the pairings for the next bout. At major events such as the Unspunnen Festival (every six years) and the Federal Wrestling Festival (every three years), the winner—called the Schwingerkönig ("wrestling king")—receives a young bull (Muneli). The wrestlers' calendar comprises around 120 events a year. The festivals on the Brünig, on the Stoos, and on the Rigi enjoy particular prestige.

== Stone throwing ==
Late-medieval sources already mention stone throwing, practiced both in town and in the countryside. At the Zürich shooting festival of 1472, three different weight categories (15, 30, and 50 pounds) were used. Like wrestling, the discipline was subsequently incorporated into the herdsmen's contests. It is attested in the 18th century in Appenzell, Glarus, and Schwyz through travel accounts, which describe stones weighing between 100 and 200 pounds, thrown with or without a run-up, with one or both hands, toward a target or for maximum distance.

The discipline received particular attention at the Unspunnen festivals of 1805 and 1808, when an erratic boulder of 83.5 kg was used. A replica has been employed since 1905 at the Unspunnen festivals and at federal wrestling festivals. Preserved at the Jungfrau Regional Museum, this stone, on which the dates of the first events are engraved, was stolen by Jura separatists in 1984. It reappeared unexpectedly at the Marché-Concours in Saignelégier in 2001, in the run-up to Expo.02, but was stolen again in September 2005.

== Hornussen ==
Hornussen, which belongs to the family of bat-and-ball games, appears in the sources shortly after 1600. It first spread in the Emmental. A vivid description of the game can be found in Jeremias Gotthelf's novel Uli der Knecht (1841). Walter Schaufelberger has noted earlier parallels in the Valais (tsara) and in Graubünden (hora, gerla); Albert Spycher mentions the Gilihüsine at Betten (Valais). In all variants, the aim was to drive a projectile (a bone or piece of root) into a marked area by striking it with a flexible rod. Players on the opposing side tried to intercept the projectile with a paddle held in front of them or thrown into the air. The importance originally given to strikes hitting the body or head links Hornussen to older war games in which the paddle served as a shield.

The team sport is today practiced mainly in the canton of Bern. The striker propels the hornuss—a 78-gram synthetic projectile placed on a launching ramp called a Bock—with a flexible rod (fouet) in the direction of the opposing field. The playing area (the Ries) begins 100 metres beyond the Bock and is 180 metres long and widens from 8 to 14 metres. The opposing team's interceptors (Abtuer) try to stop the projectile with paddles held up or thrown into the air. A panel of six judges determines whether the projectile has been intercepted, and at what distance. If it lands in the playing area uninterrupted, the interceptors are penalized. The penalties determine the score, both individual and per team, of the strikers. Each striker is entitled to two times two attempts. Once all players have struck, the teams swap roles.

The teams (or Gesellschaften), consisting of 16 to 18 men depending on category, usually have their own playing field. Players train almost daily during the season, which includes championships at different levels (group, association, and elite), intercantonal meetings, and the Federal Hornussen Festival (Eidgenössisches Hornusserfest), held every three years, the first of which took place at Heimiswil in 1903. In 2005, 271 societies were registered.

== Bibliography ==
- W. Egloff, Gilihüsine, [film], 1956.
- W. Schaufelberger, Der Wettkampf in der Alten Eidgenossenschaft, 1972.
- A. Spycher, Kegeln, Gilihüsine und Volkstheater in Betten (VS), 1985.
- Les jeux nationaux et populaires de la Suisse, exhibition catalogue, Basel, 1991 (with bibliography).
- B. Schader, W. Leimgruber (eds.), Festgenossen, 1993.
- 100 Jahre Eidgenössischer Schwingerverband 1895–1995, 1995.
- N. Wiedmer, Schlagen und Abtun, [film], 1999.

== See also ==
- Sport in Switzerland
