= Unspunnen =

Unspunnen can refer to:

- the ruins of Unspunnen Castle
- the Unspunnenfest held there since 1805
- the Unspunnen Stone, symbol of the Unspunnenfest
