= Steinstossen =

Swiss stone throwing competition

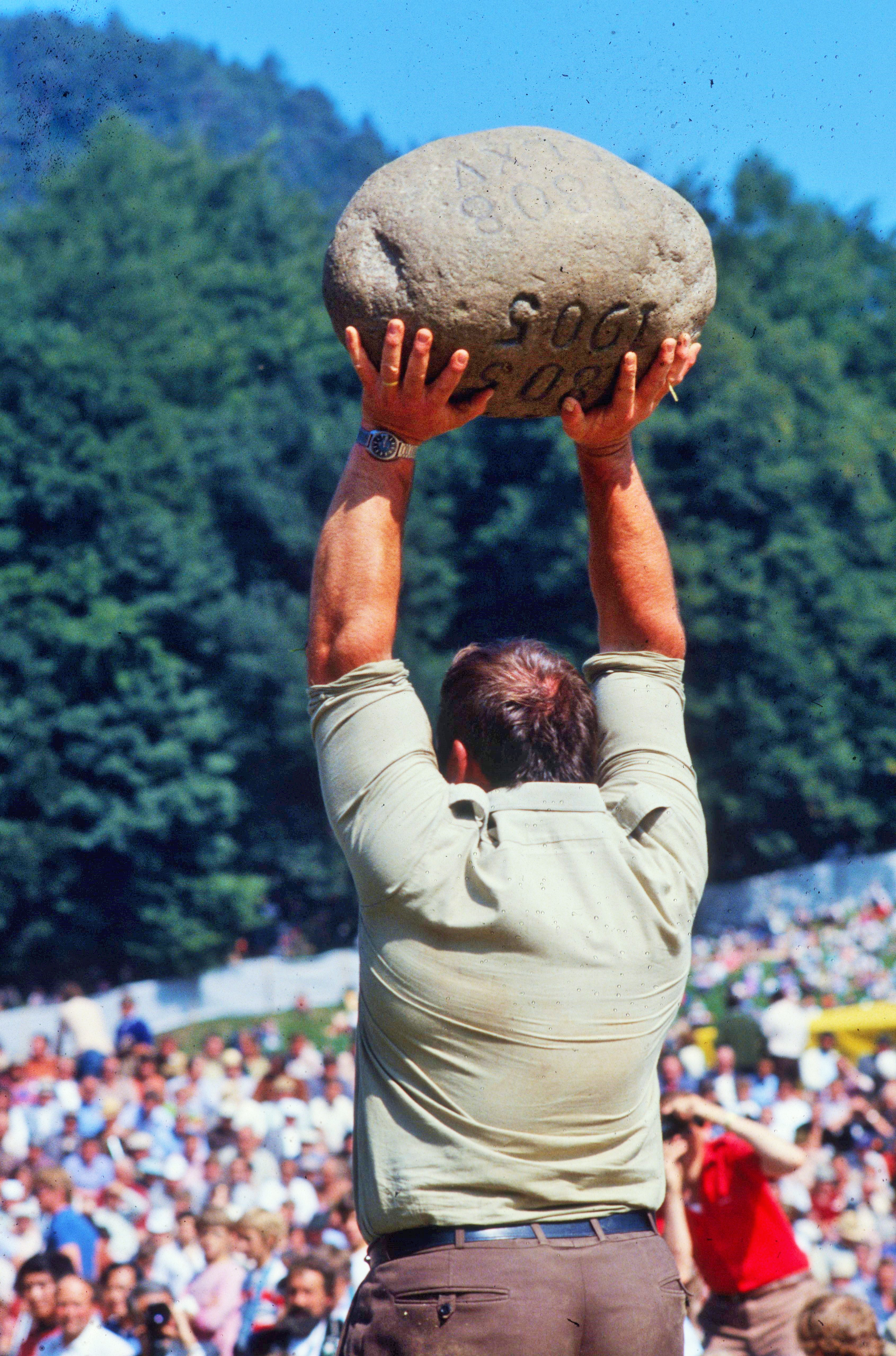
Steinstossen (1981 Unspunnenfest)

Steinstossen (translated to 'stone throwing' in English) is the Swiss variant of stone put, of throwing a heavy stone overhead using both arms for the longest distance. Practiced among the alpine population since prehistoric times, it is recorded to have taken place in Basel in the 13th century. During the 15th century, it is frequently recorded to have been practiced alongside the Schützenfeste of the Old Swiss Confederacy.

The historical throwing event is also central to the Unspunnenfest, a festival inaugurated in 1805 in Interlaken near the old ruins of Unspunnen Castle in the Bernese Alps, and held once every twelve years.

== Unspunnen stone throw ==
One of the main highlights of the Unspunnenfest is the 'Unspunnen stone throw' where the contestants have to begin on a 6.1 metres (20 ft 0 in) runway, hurling the 83.5 kg (184 lb) stone into a 4-inch-deep (100 mm) sand pit. The unique stone is carved out from Aare granite of the Hasli valley.

== World records ==
=== All-time record ===
- 83.5 kg (184 lb) for 4.16 metres (13 ft 8 in) by Urs Hutmacher (Switzerland) (2025 Eidgenössischen Schwing und Älplerfest, Mollis)

→ Hutmacher surpassed Maire's 4.11 metres (13 ft 6 in) from 2004 Eidgenössisches Schwing und Älplerfest.

=== Unspunnen record ===
- 83.5 kg (184 lb) for 3.98 metres (13 ft 1 in) by Urs Hutmacher (Switzerland) (2023 Unspunnenschwinget, Interlaken)

→ Hutmacher surpassed Maire's 3.89 metres (12 ft 9 in) from 2006 Unspunnenschwinget.

== International variations ==
=== Germany ===
In 1860, Steinstossen was introduced as a track-and-field discipline in Germany, retaining the name in spite of the stone being replaced by a 15 kg (33 lb) block of iron.

=== United States ===
==== Ohio Swiss Festival ====
Within the United States, the Ohio Swiss Festival in Sugarcreek has the distinction of being the longest running competition, having run annually since 1956. Contestants in the men's division hurl a stone weighing 61.25 kg (135 lb). They begin on a 6.1 metres (20 ft 0 in) runway, hurling the rock into a 4-inch-deep (100 mm) sand pit. The record holder of this event for 21 years was Jud Logan of North Canton, Ohio, with a throw of 4.37 metres (14 ft 4 in). That record was broken by Beaux Lenarz in 2005 with a throw of 4.42 metres (14 ft 6 in). There is also a women's division, using a 34 kg (75 lb) stone. The women's record is held by Roberta Collins of Sandusky with a throw of 3.87 metres (12 ft 8 in).

==== German-American Festival ====
Steinstossen at the annual German-American Festival, in Toledo, began in 1989. The competition is scheduled for a two-hour period beginning at 3:00 pm on Saturday and Sunday. Kevin Marx of Toledo, in 2009, had a throw of 4.66 metres (15 ft 3 in). A different rock is used at this festival than is used at the Ohio Swiss Festival so the two cannot be directly compared, even though both rocks weigh the same. The women's record at the German-American Festival is held by Becky Ball of Marblehead with a throw of 3.94 metres (12 ft 11 in), in 2007.

==== Arnold Strongman Classic ====
The steintossen is one of the regular events which may feature, on a selective basis, in the annual Arnold Strongman Classic competition. In the 2023 competition in Columbus, Ohio, the contestants had to throw an 84 kg (185 lb) replica of the Unspunnenfest stone. Poland's Mateusz Kieliszkowski threw the stone for 3.47 metres (11 ft 5 in) to win the men's event. The women's competition was won by Victoria Long of USA who threw a 50 kg (110 lb) replica for 3.31 metres (10 ft 10 in) to win the event.

== See also ==
- Swiss national sports
- Hornussen
- Schwingen
