= Brawand family =

Swiss noble family

von Brawand
- Country: Bern, Switzerland
- Founded: before 1341
- Founder: Julian van Brabant-Aiseau
- Titles: Freiherr
- Estate: Castle Unspunnen

The von Brawand family was a noble Swiss family. First citizens of Bern around 1445, they were the leading family of the Interlaken canton. They remained overseers for the canton in the Alpine region for centuries. The family were descendants was Jan of Brabant, son of the last Duke of Brabant, Jan III. Members of the family still have regional influence in Switzerland today.

== Origins ==
The von Brawand family is a line of the House of Brabant, descending from Jan III's bastard son, Jan de Brant. While frequently referred to by his mother's maiden name de Brant, he and his descendants adopted the Brabantian coat of arms and the cadet style van Brabant-Aiseau, after the Lordship they held. His son Jan II van Brabant-Aiseau married the heiress Julienne van Beaufort-Spontin around 1385. Through their only son Jan III, their youngest grandson Julian Sieger was Lord of Aiseau and Governor of Brabant. A courtier of the Philip the Good of Burgundy, he married his daughter Josephine in 1444. She died the next year while Julian was serving as Burgundian minister to Savoy, Milan and the Old Swiss Confederacy. He remarried in Geneva Adelheid von Erlach. He was raised to Lord of Unspunnen by the City of Bern that year, when he yielded his title to Aiseau to his brother Jan IV. While a noble in the Canton of Bern with both legal powers and privileges, Julian and his descendants were not considered patricians of the City of Bern.

The next notable mention of the family is in 1515, when Julian Sieger II von Brawand sold the land of Unspunnen to the City of Bern, retaining the title Lord of Unspunnen and the position of castellan through Julian's only child Nike (Niklaus). The family served as Swiss mercenaries throughout the 15th and 16th centuries.

== Modern era ==
The von Brawand family were influential and prosperous throughout the early modern period, albeit reserved. They served in various position as bailiffs, judges and merchants. Chasing an adventurous spirit, Herr Josef Sieger von Browand immigrated to the British Colony of Carolina and later Pennsylvania. His son Jakob married Athénaïs of Nassau in 1826. The family dropped the nobiliary particle von upon Switzerland's Restoration in 1815. Notable members in the 20th century include Swiss politicians Samuel and de:Marcel Brawand, and co-founder of Der Spiegel, de:Leo Brawand. Both Samuel and Marcel Brawand were citizens of Grindelwald, the family's ancestral village since 1445.
