= Stone tossing =

Stone tossing may refer to

- Stone put – Scottish heavy athletic event
- Stone skipping, a practice of throwing rocks to bounce on a water surface
- Stone throwing, a criminal battery offense
