= Stone put =

Scottish heavy athletic event

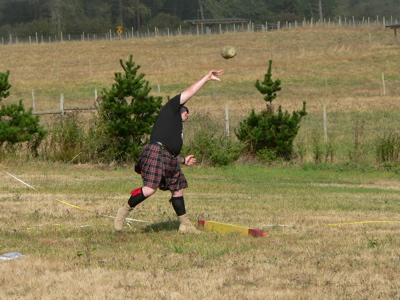
The stone put event at the 2005 Whidbey Island Highland Games

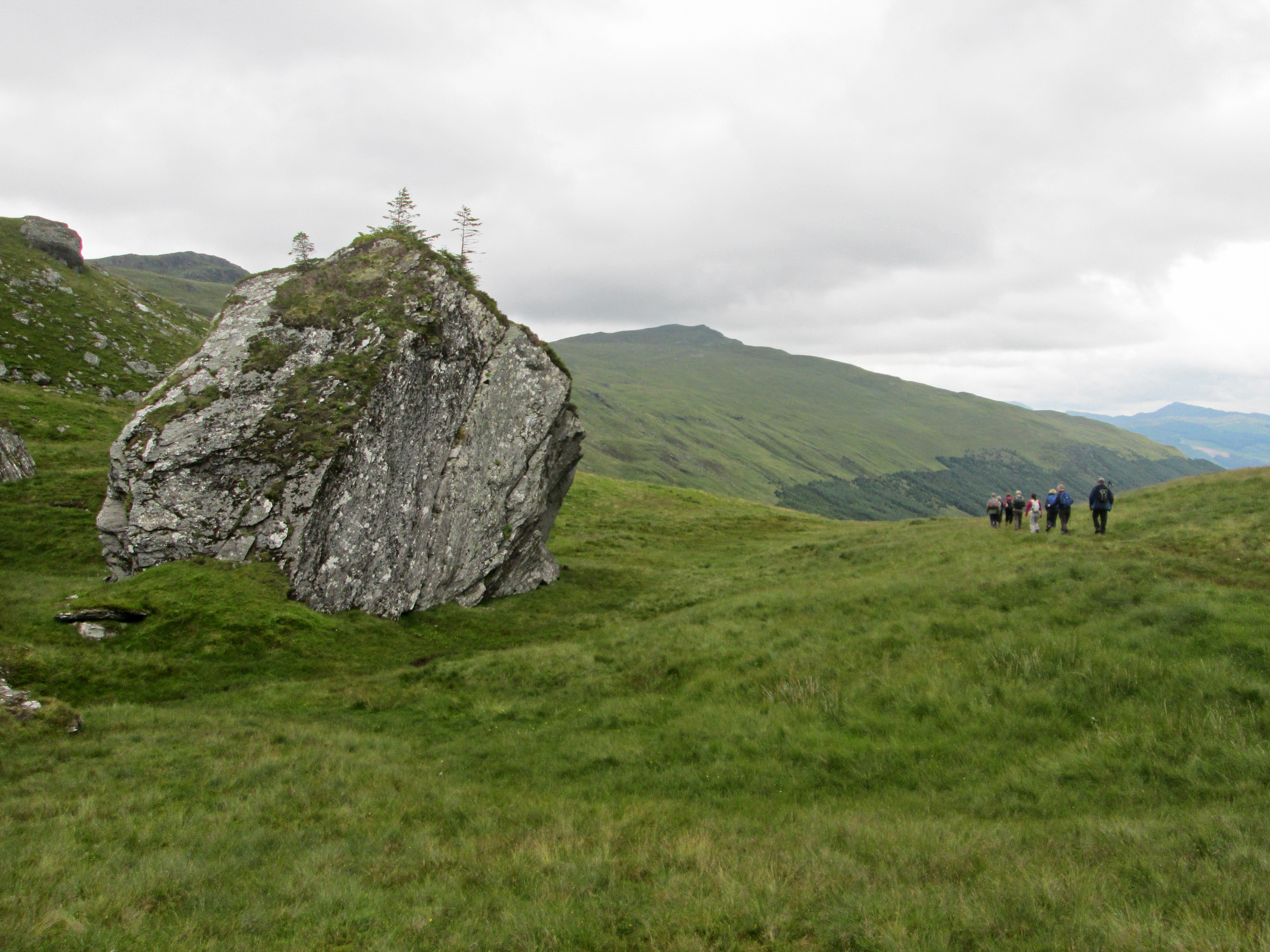
Rob Roy's Putting Stone, a boulder supposedly used by Rob Roy MacGregor

The stone put (Scottish Gaelic: clach air a chur) is one of the main Scottish heavy athletic events at modern-day Highland games gatherings. While similar to the shot put, the stone put more frequently uses an ordinary stone or rock instead of a steel ball. The weight of the stone varies from 7.3–13.6 kg (16–30 lb) for men (or 3.6–8.2 kg (8–18 lb) for women) depending on which type of stone put event (Braemar stone or Open stone) is being contested and also on the idiosyncrasies of the event (mainly because stones in use have no standard weight). There are also some differences in allowable techniques and rules.

Robert Burns was keen on stone putting and apparently left his favourite putting stone at Ellisland Farm near Dumfries. If he saw anyone using it whilst he lived there he would call "Bide a wee" and join in the sport, always proving that he was the strongest man there.

== Origin of the stone put ==
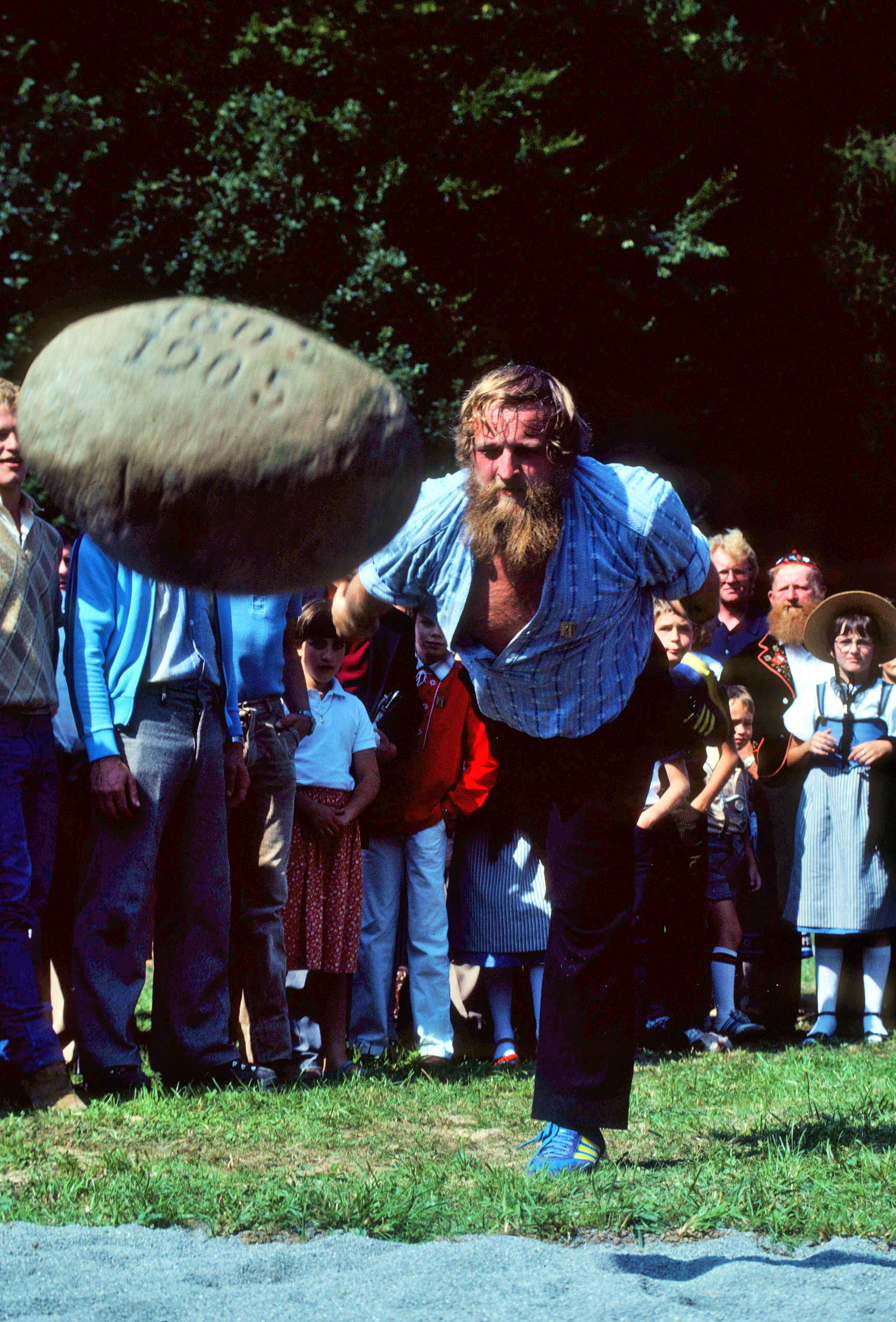
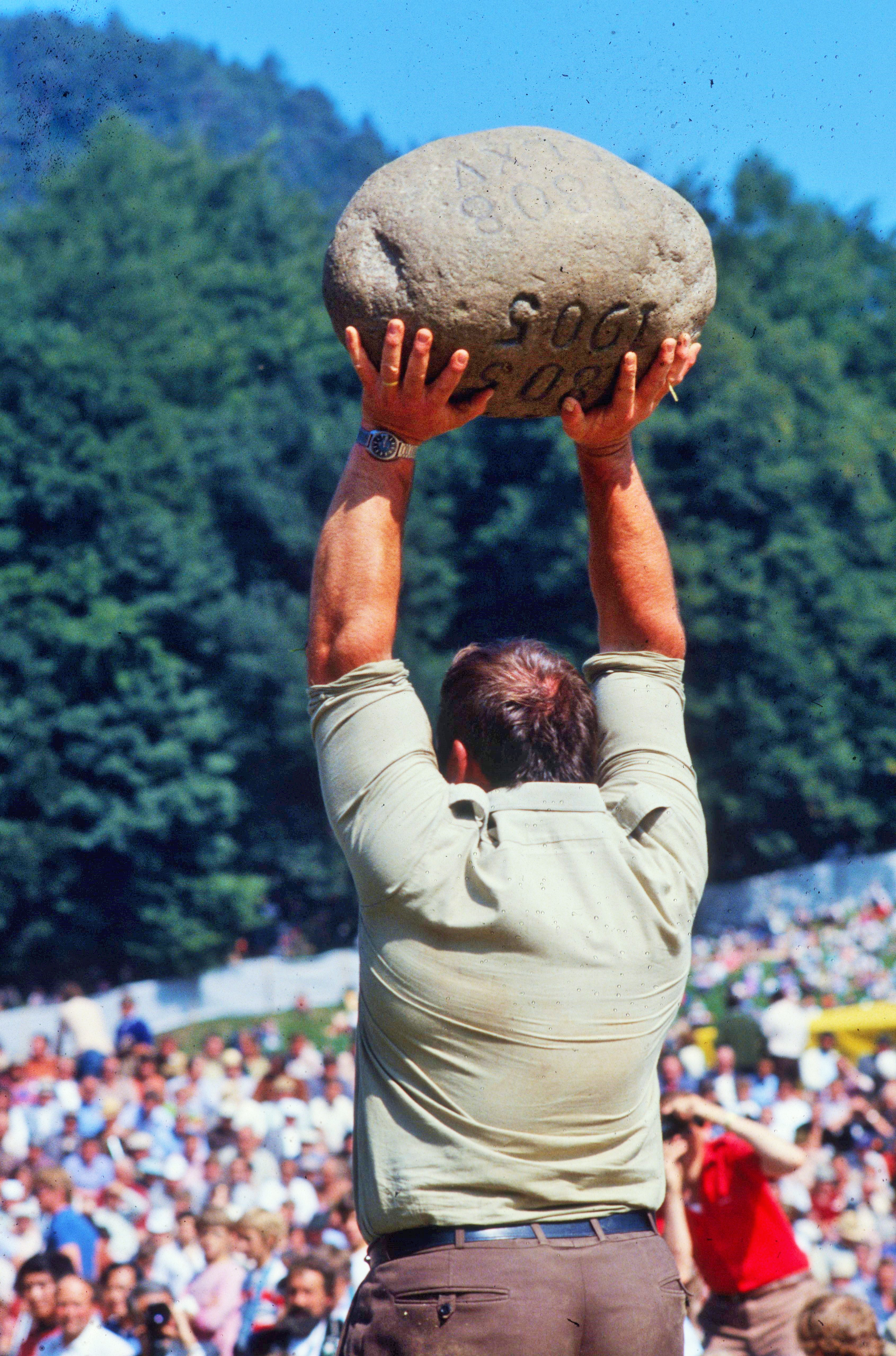
The throwing of a heavy 83.5 kg stone is a traditional event practiced at the Swiss cultural festival, the Unspunnenfest

As with most aspects of the Scottish Highland games, and Scottish Highlands culture generally, a certain amount of legend has grown around the origins and antiquity of the stone put.

Michael Brander, in his 1992 book Essential Guide to the Highland Games, reports on some of the stories concerning the stone put which have become traditional. He discusses what have become known to tradition as the "stones of strength" which were of two types. In one, the Clach Cuid Fir (or Manhood Stone), a very large stone of well over 100 lb is employed and the test is to be able to lift it to a certain height or place it on a wall.

In the other type, the Clach Neart (or Stone of Strength), a smaller stone, variable in weight, but around 20 or 30 lb, is employed. The object is to see how far the stone could be thrown or putted.

In addition to the Highland Games, throughout European history the stone put has been a popular form of exercise with records dating from Ancient Greece. It was also a popular leisure activity in the medieval ages. The practice of heavy stone throwing also continues as part of Unspunnenfest, which is a traditional Swiss festival which dates from the 13th Century. It features the throwing of an 83 kg stone. The event, called the steinstossen, typically uses a two arm throwing style. Similar events also continue as part of cultural festivals found internationally, such as the Ohio Swiss Festival and the German-American Festival, in addition to professional strength competitions such as the Arnold Strongman Classic.

== International events and variations ==
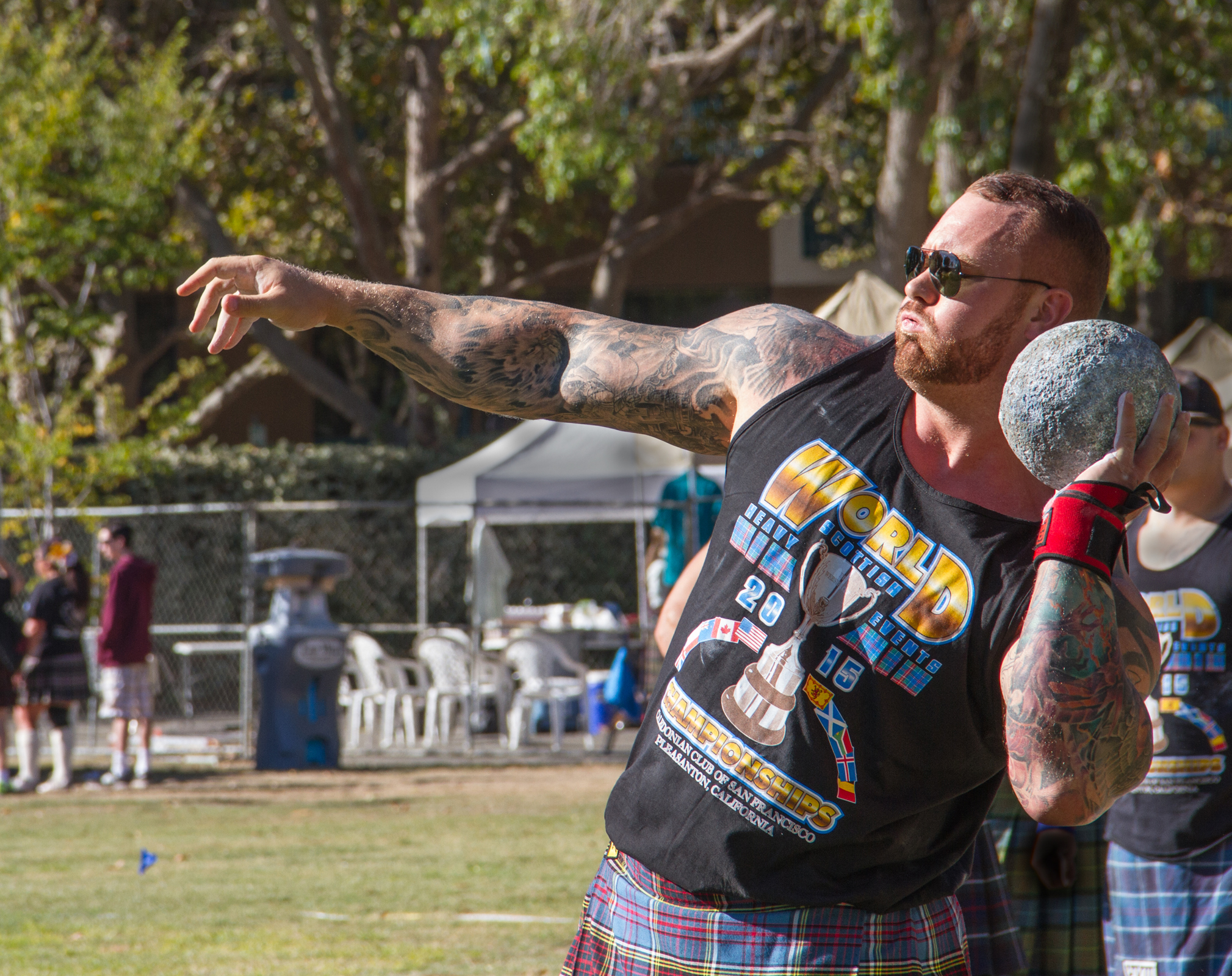
Strongman legend Hafthór Júlíus Björnsson loads up to put the stone at the Scottish Highland Gathering and Games, in 2015.

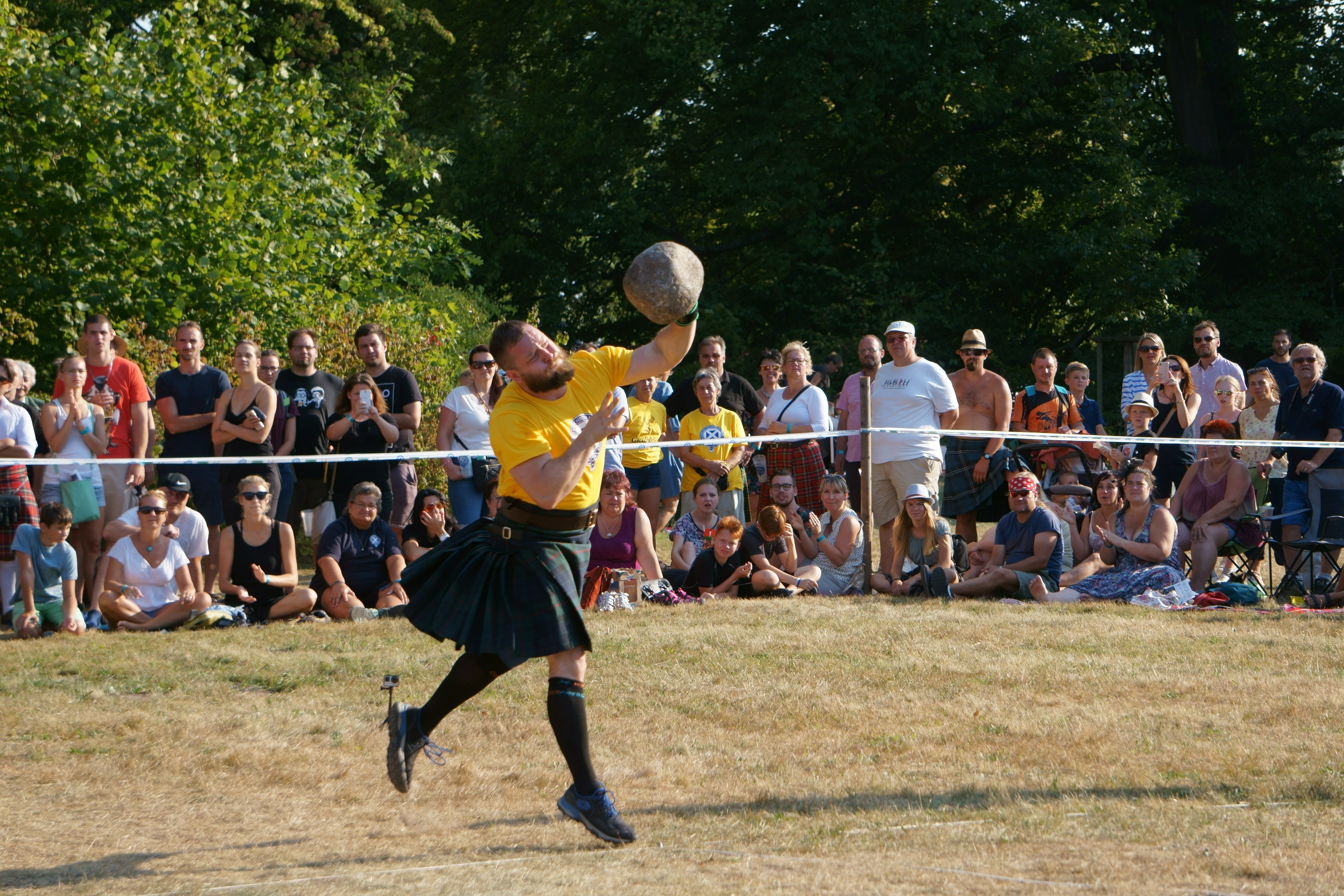
A stone put from the Highland Games Sychrov in the Czech Republic, 2018.

The stone put features as a competitive strength event in numerous cultural festivals found internationally.

=== USA ===
==== Stone Mountain Highland Games ====
Features a weight throw involving the one armed put of a heavy stone. There are professional and amateur divisions, and divisions for men and women.

==== U.S. National Highland Games ====
The Braemar stone event involves the putting of a 24-pound stone from standing.

==== Phoenix Scottish Games ====
The 'Braemar Stone Put' event involves the putting of a heavy stone from standing. There is also an 'open stone' variation which allows movement in the throwing area, similar to an Olympic shot put.

==== Scottish Highland Gathering and Games ====
The Scottish Highland Gathering and Games hosts the U.S. Invitational Heavy Athletics Championships, which include two stone put events: the Braemar stone put, featuring a 22 lb stone, and the open stone put featuring a 16 lb stone.

=== Canada ===
==== Canmore Highland Games ====
This festival features a heavy sports event involving a stone put from standing. In 2023, the women's event was won by Siri Svensson.

=== England ===
==== The Peak District Highland Games ====
'The Giant Stone Throw' involves the two-handed throw of a stone over the head from standing. The thrower starts off facing the opposite direction to the throwing sector before crouching down to preload the throw, and then throwing the stone vigorously over their head behind them into the sector. The longest throw wins the contest.

==== Richmond Highland Games ====
The heavy athletics competition involves a Braemar event with a put from standing with a 19-28 lb stone. The feet are allowed to be reversed after the throw. There is also an open stone event involving a 16 lb stone and where taking an approach before the throw is allowed.

=== France ===
==== Bressuire Highland Games ====
These games feature a light and heavy stone put. The light stone weighs 7.5 kg and the throw can be taken after a run up. The light stone is made out of granite taken from the Berson quarry in Largeasse, in 2003. The heavy stone is 10 kg and thrown in the Braemar style, without a run up.

=== Germany ===
==== International Highland Games Angelbachtal ====
Features a single arm stone throw for distance. The men's event uses a 7 kg stone and the women's event a 4 kg stone.

== World records ==
=== One-arm throws ===
==== Braemar Stone ====
- 13.5 kg (30 lb) – 11.65 metres (38 ft 3 in) by Pétur Guðmundsson (Iceland) (2000)
- 12.5 kg (28 lb) – 12.47 metres (40 ft 11 in) by Pétur Guðmundsson (Iceland) (2000)
- 10 kg (22 lb) – 15.45 metres (50 ft 8 in) by Burger Lambrechts Jr. (South Africa) (2025)
- 9.1 kg (20 lb) – 17.37 metres (57 ft 0 in) by Geoff Capes (United Kingdom) (1981)

==== Open Stone ====
- 11.4 kg (25 lb) – 14.15 metres (46 ft 5 in) by Brian Oldfield (United States) (1979)
- 9.1 kg (20 lb) – 16.33 metres (53 ft 7 in) by Paul Ferency (United States) (1985)
- 7.7 kg (17 lb) – 19.23 metres (63 ft 1 in) by Brian Oldfield (United States) (1979)
- 7.3 kg (16 lb) – 19.52 metres (64 ft 1 in) by Burger Lambrechts Jr. (South Africa) (2026)

==== Other ====
Heavy shot put:

→ These shots are significantly heavier than the Olympic shots which weigh 7.26 kg (16 lb)

- 15 kg (33 lb) – 8.67 metres (28 ft 5 in) by Oskar Ziółkowski (Poland) (2022)
- 14 kg (31 lb) – 10.07 metres (33 ft 0 in) by Krzysztof Radzikowski (Poland) (2016)
- 10 kg (22 lb) – 16.26 metres (53 ft 4 in) by Geoff Capes (United Kingdom) (1982)

=== Both-arm throws ===
==== Steinstossen ====
- 83.5 kg (184 lb) – 4.16 metres (13 ft 8 in) by Urs Hutmacher (Switzerland) (2025)

==== Stone block throw ====
- 25 kg (55 lb) – 7.86 metres (25 ft 9 in) by Bill Kazmaier (United States) (1987)

== See also ==
- Ballistic training
- Lifting stone (Clach-ultaich)
- Steinstossen
- Shot put
