= Thomas Borer =

Swiss diplomat (born 1957)

Thomas Borer PhD
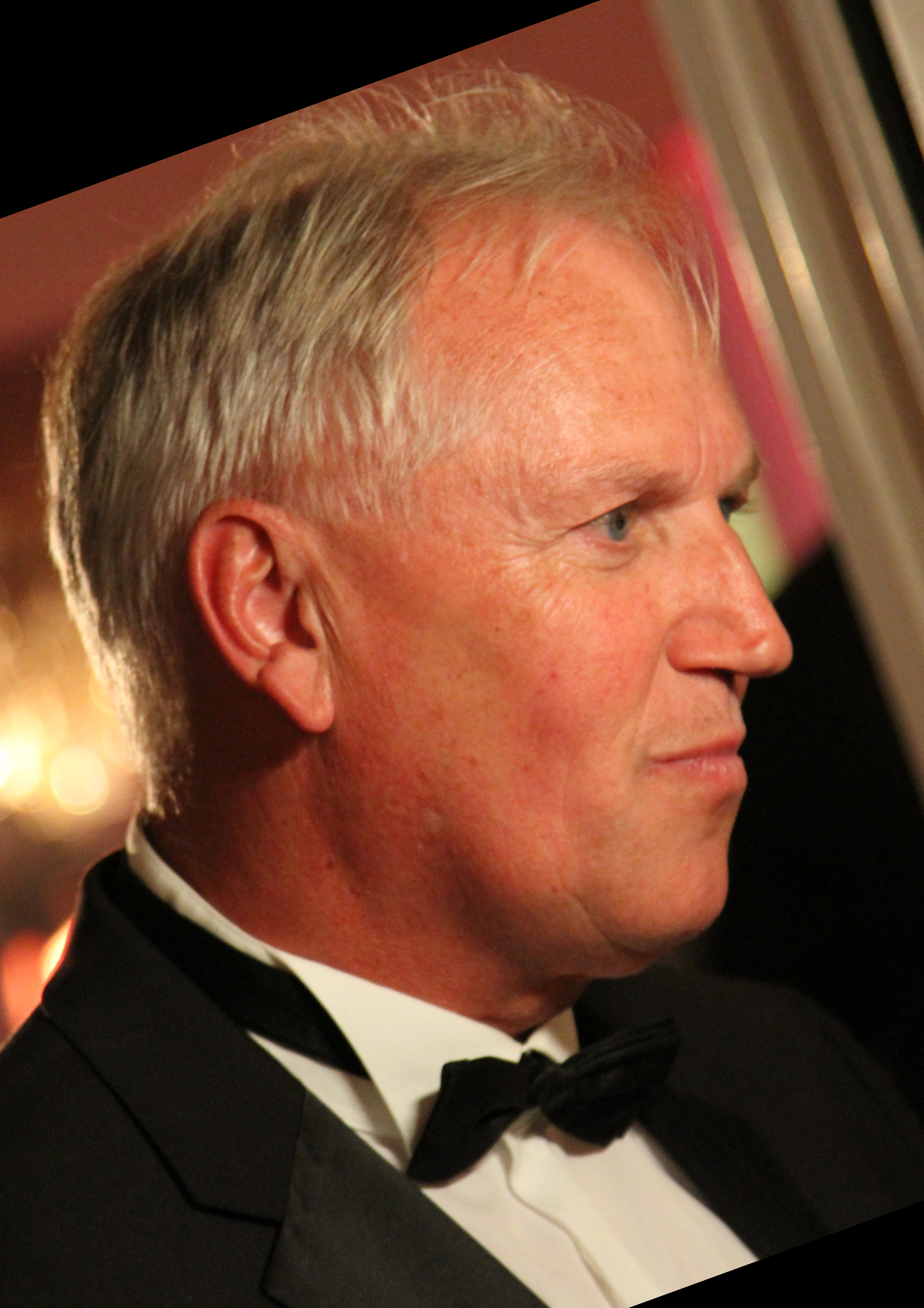
- Thomas Borer in 2016
- Born: Thomas Gustav Borer; July 29, 1957 (age 69); Basel, Switzerland
- Occupations: Management consultant, lobbyist and former diplomat
- Spouses: Shawne Fielding (m. 1999; div. 2014) Denise Borer (m. 2015; div. 2021)
- Children: 3
- Website: Official website

Thomas Gustav Borer (born 29 July 1957) is a Swiss management consultant, lobbyist and former diplomat. From 1996 to 1999 he headed the Switzerland – Second World War Task Force. He then was Switzerland's ambassador to Germany until 2002.

== Early life and education ==
Borer was born 29 July 1957 in Basel, Switzerland. He studied law at the University of Basel where he obtained his doctorate summa cum laude in 1985. His thesis focused on the principle of legality and foreign affairs.

== Career ==
Borer started his career at Credit Suisse in Geneva.

=== Activity as a Diplomat ===
In 1987, Borer joined the Federal Department of Foreign Affairs (FDFA) as a diplomat. He was posted to Bern (Department for International Law, 1987 and 1989–93), Lagos (1987/88) and Geneva (1988/89). In 1993, he was appointed Embassy Secretary for Legal and Political Affairs at the Swiss Embassy in Washington, USA. In 1993, Borer played a decisive role in shaping the future strategy of Swiss neutrality policy, which is still in force today. He wrote the report on neutrality. 30 years later, in April and May 2023, Borer publishes a number of articles supported by sound arguments that question Swiss neutrality. On 21 December 1994, he was appointed Deputy General Secretary of the EDA by the Swiss Federal Council. In this role, he led the personnel, technology, logistics, finance and administrative law departments. In addition, he was responsible for the reorganisation of the EDA and the Swiss Representative Network Abroad.

On 25 October 1996 the Swiss Federal Council appointed him Ambassador and Head of the “Switzerland – Second World War” Task Force, which examined the role of Switzerland as a financial centre during the Nazi era. The Task Force contributed substantially to settle a lawsuit filed by the Holocaust survivors against Swiss banks in 1995. As a consequence, on 12 August 1998 the Swiss banks UBS and Credit Suisse reached an agreement with the claimants and agreed to pay $1.25 billion to victims of the holocaust or their heirs. Borer gained international recognition for his commitment in this process.

On 31 March 1999, the Swiss Federal Council named Borer as Swiss Ambassador to the Federal Republic of Germany. At the end of April 2002, he left public service and returned to Switzerland. Shortly after he became strategic consultant for Russian oligarch Viktor Vekselberg, and in 2005 a member of the Board of Directors of Renova Group, Viktor Vekselberg's company. He stepped down in 2010 and has since been working as a strategic advisor for different private and public companies.

In the German and international news media, Borer is a popular speaker and commentator on economic issues and on Swiss-German relations, particularly on Switzerland as a financial center and on the banking secrecy.

=== Consultant ===
After retiring from diplomacy, Thomas Borer became a management consultant in 2002. Since then he has been active in the strategic representation of interests in politics, business, society and the media. He performs various mandates for companies and individuals.

From 2010 to 2015 Borer was president and chief executive officer of Swiss Authentication Research and Development AG, which develops chemical and physical security solutions to protect against counterfeit products. He was also a member of the advisory board of Corestate Capital Holding SA between 2010 and 2017. Borer currently also holds various board memberships. Since 2017 he has been Chairman of the supervisory board of Capita Customer Services (Germany) GmbH, since 2018 Chairman of the Board of Directors of Global Bridge Strategies AG, a legal consultancy based in Zurich, and since 2019 also chairman of the Board of Directors of BRR Investment AG. He has also been a member of the board of directors at Hendricks & Schwartz (Switzerland) AG since 2006. Borer has been on the advisory board of Oriflame Cosmetics AG since 2010 and on the advisory board of the Swiss language technology provider Spitch.

In January 2015 it was announced that Borer would support the Kazakh government interests in Switzerland from spring 2014 for a fee of 30,000 dollars per month. The focus was on the extradition of Viktor Vyacheslavovich Chrapunov, a Kazakh oligarch and former Kazakh energy minister, who embezzled millions and then applied for asylum in Switzerland. The Federal Prosecutor's office dismissed an indictment by Chrapunow against Borer .

Borer appears in the media as a speaker and commentator on geopolitical and economic issues, on German-Swiss relations, especially with the Swiss financial center and banking secrecy, as well as international political relations in Europe and North America.

== Private life ==
Borer was married to Shawne Fielding from 1999 to 2014; the couple separated in 2010. Borer is divorced, has three children, two of them with Fielding. He currently lives and works in Thalwil, Switzerland.

== Publications ==
- Books
  - Borer, Thomas / René Lüchinger. Die Schweiz gegen die Welt – Nazigold, nachrichtenlose Konten und das Krisenmanagement 1996–1999. Zürich: NZZ Libro, 2025. ISBN 978-3-03980-025-4.
  - Borer, Thomas. Die Task Force Schweiz – Zweiter Weltkrieg. Band 1-5. Hamburg: BoD, 2025.
  - Borer, Thomas. Public Affairs – Bekenntnisse eines Diplomaten. München: Econ, 2003. ISBN 3-430-11567-1.
  - Borer, Thomas. Das Legalitätsprinzip und die auswärtigen Angelegenheiten. Basel / Frankfurt a. M.: Helbing und Lichtenhahn, 1986. ISBN 3-7190-0937-8.
- Articles, Book Chapters and Conference Documents
  - Borer, Thomas. “Wir brauchen mehr Leadership.” In: Claude Baumann & Ralph Pöhner (Hg.), Neustart – 50 Ideen für einen starken Finanzplatz Schweiz. Zürich, 2015.
  - Borer, Thomas. Die Auseinandersetzung Schweiz – Zweiter Weltkrieg: Ein neuer Typ politischer Risiken für Unternehmen und die Lehren für die Zukunft? In: Symposium zum Management politischer Risiken in Finanzinstitutionen, Universität St. Gallen. Zürich: Maerki Baumann, 2001.
  - Borer, Thomas. “Introductory Declaration” and “Concluding Statement.” In: Washington Conference on Holocaust-Era Assets, 30 Nov – 3 Dec 1998. Department of State Publication 10603. Washington D.C.: U.S. Government Printing Office, 1999, S. 121 ff., 333 ff.
  - Borer, Thomas. “Switzerland and World War II: A General Presentation.” In: Washington Conference on Holocaust-Era Assets, 1999, S. 349 ff.
  - Borer, Thomas. “Switzerland’s Role in the Trade of Art Works Stolen by the Nazis.” In: Washington Conference on Holocaust-Era Assets, 1999, S. 355 ff.
  - Borer, Thomas. “Teaching Tolerance.” In: Washington Conference on Holocaust-Era Assets, 1999, S. 361 ff.
  - Borer, Thomas. “Proposal on the Fight Against the Use of the Internet for Racist, Anti-Semitic or Hate Purposes.” In: Washington Conference on Holocaust-Era Assets, 1999, S. 373 ff.
  - Borer, Thomas. “Holocaust Era Assets, Looted Art – The Swiss Perspective.” In: J. D. Bindenagel (ed.), Washington Conference on Holocaust-Era Assets, Washington D.C., 1999.
  - Borer, Thomas. “Assets of the Holocaust: The Swiss Perspective.” Whittier Law Review, Vol. 20, No. 3, 1999.
  - Borer, Thomas. Informationsführung in einer Krisenlage. Aarau, 1998.
  - Borer, Thomas. Switzerland – Second World War. London Conference on Nazi Gold. London, 1997.
  - Borer, Thomas. Die bewaffnete Neutralität der Schweiz. Thun, 1996.
  - Borer, Thomas. “Struktur und Arbeitsweise des EDA im Wandel.” Revue d’Allemagne et des Pays de Langue Allemande, 1996.
  - Borer, Thomas. The Role of Switzerland as Financial Center during World War II. Statement before the U.S. House of Representatives Committee on Banking and Financial Services. Washington D.C., 1996.
  - Borer, Thomas. Switzerland and the European Economic Union. Washington D.C., 1993.
  - Borer, Thomas. Schweizerische Neutralität auf dem Prüfstand – Schweizerische Aussenpolitik zwischen Kontinuität und Wandel. Bern, 1992.

== Literature ==
- Oliver Zihlmann, Philippe Pfister: Der Fall Borer. Fakten und Hintergründe eines Medienskandals. Werd Verlag. Zürich. 2003.

In 2025, Thomas Borer published "Die Task Force Schweiz - Zweiter Weltkrieg, Nazigold und nachrichtenlose Vermögen. Die grosse aussenpolitische Krise der Schweiz in den Jahren 1996 bis 1999", a five-volume work totalling 2808 pages. The book is based on the work of the task force he headed and is published at the same time as the opening of central archive documents. In it, Borer describes how he and his team succeeded in protecting Switzerland's interests. Among other things, he refers to discussions with leading representatives of Jewish organisations, US politicians and representatives of the Swiss authorities. The publication was seen as a significant contribution to the historical reappraisal of the events of the time. According to Borer, the complete documents of the task force are to be handed over to the Archives of Contemporary History.

Later that year, another book was published, conceived as an accompanying interpretation and summary of the preceding work. It was co-authored by René Lüchinger, former editor-in-chief of Blick and Bilanz, together with Thomas Borer.
