= Shawne Fielding =

American-Swiss actress and model

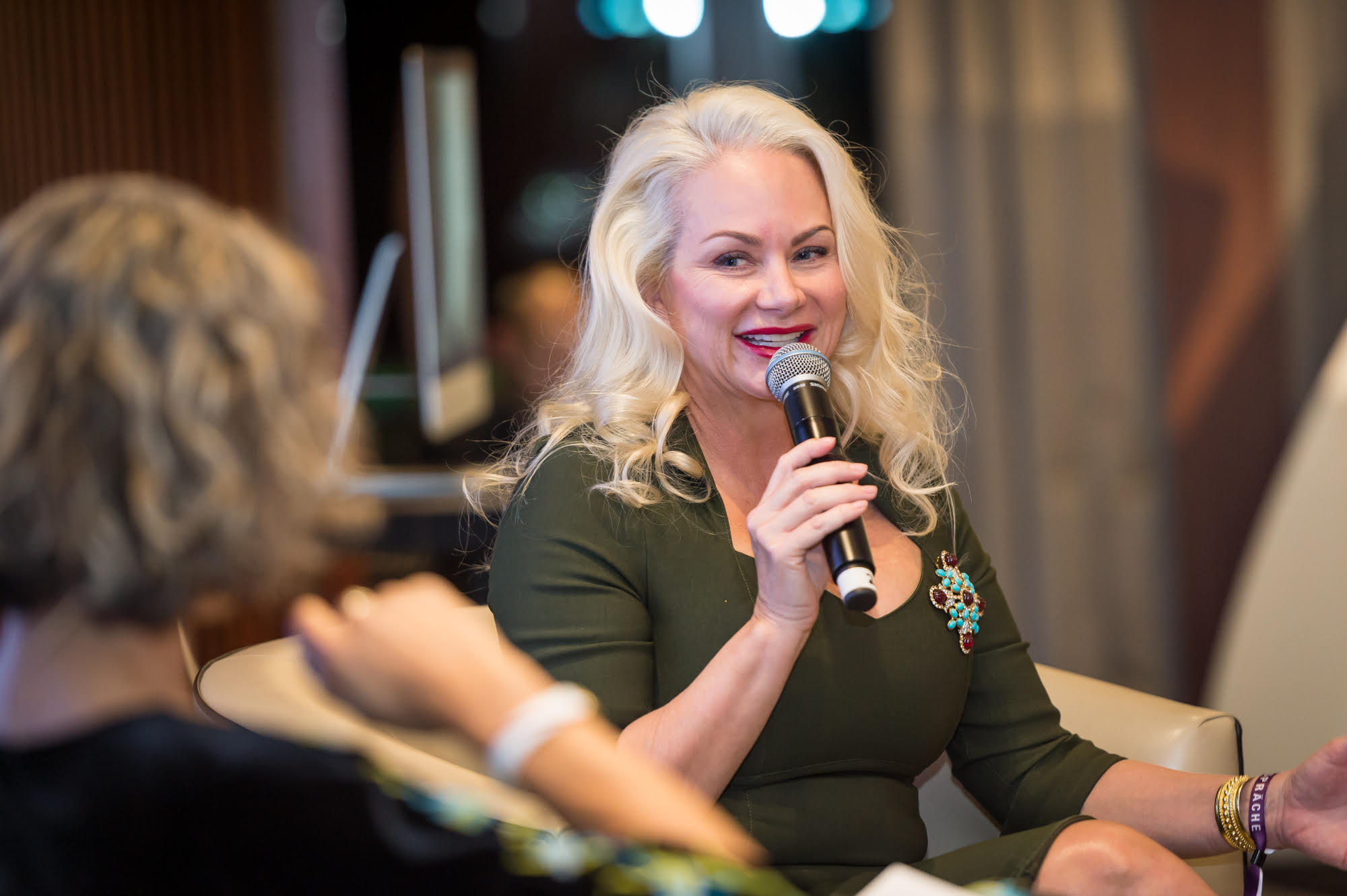
- Fielding speaking at an event
- Born: 27 June 1969 (age 57); El Paso, Texas, United States
- Education: Southern Methodist University
- Occupations: Actress and model
- Spouses: Charles Addison Williams (m. 1994; div. 1998) Thomas Borer (m. 1999; div. 2014) Charles Addison Williams (m. 2022)

Shawne Fielding (born in El Paso, Texas, United States, on 27 June 1969) is an American-Swiss actress and model who has appeared in US, German, and Swiss television series and movies. Notably, Fielding had been married to Thomas Borer, former Swiss ambassador to Germany, and twice to American billionaire Charles Addison Williams of Sammons Enterprises, her current husband again.

== Early days ==
Fielding attended Southern Methodist University in Dallas, where she earned a Bachelor of Arts in Advertising with a minor in Psychology. She was also Miss Dallas USA and 6th runner-up to Miss Texas USA and Mrs. Dallas America. Fielding won Mrs. Texas America, and was also the 3rd runner-up at Mrs. America.

== Life and career ==
Though born in Texas, Fielding became strongly integrated into Swiss society, and has been featured in the Carnival of Basel.

On 12 August 2001, at the Marche-Concours in Saignelegier, where she was present as an official ambassador of the Swiss National Exhibition, she was presented by the Jurassic Béliers with the Unspunnenstein, which had been stolen by the Beliers in 1984 from the Museum of the Jungfrau Region in Interlaken.

Fielding received the Unspunnenstein, a large stone of Swiss historical significance used in the Unspunnenfest that led to the final formation of Switzerland’s 26 cantons.

In addition, Fielding's portrait and clothing are displayed in the National History Museum, Berlin, the Swiss National Museum, and the Audrey Hepburn Museum. She has also been named as a cult figure (Kultfigur) in Europe.

=== Marriage to Borer ===
From 1999 to 2014, Fielding was married for the second time to Thomas Borer. The couple gained much media attention in Germany and Switzerland, with Fielding continuing to be in the media long after the "Borer Affair". Her photo gallery, for example as "Cowgirl from the Alps", as "Cinderella", and as "Gunslinger" in the journal Max, led in 2001 to diplomatic complications, in the course of which the dismissal of Thomas Borer as ambassador loomed. After an apology from Fielding, the affair was, however, shelved. Fielding also caused a sensation when she took legal action against a photomontage showing her scantily dressed and "topless", which had even gained attention at a White House press briefing. She won her lawsuit against the publication in the Berlin district court, and the court banned another reprint of the controversial photos in 2001.

During the Borer affair, in which the Sonntagsblick newspaper imputed her then husband in an illicit sexual affair with the Berlin-based Djamila Rowe, she stood by her husband. Subsequently, she suffered a miscarriage in 2002 and lost their child. The Swiss government recalled their ambassador in Germany back to Bern under the impression that he could no longer fulfill his duties as a philandering media spectacle. He was subsequently recalled to Bern to become the ambassador-at-large for refugee camps. Borer escaped the imminent recall by his own resignation.

Borer and Fielding filed a claim for damages in the US court system against the Ringier publishing house, which had to apologize in public and pay compensation reportedly in the millions of Swiss francs.

In 2010, Fielding filed for divorce from Borer, ending a troubled marriage. The couple have two children together.

=== Relationship with Schöpf ===
From 2014, Fielding lived with her partner Patrick Schöpf, a former professional ice hockey goalie, in Immensee, in the canton of Schwyz. In 2018, she and her partner took part in the RTL show The Summerhouse of the Stars – Battle of the Celebrity Couples (German: Das Sommerhaus der Stars – Kampf der Promipaare), and came in 2nd.

=== Remarriage to Williams ===
Fielding left Schöpf in July 2020. On 25 September 2020, the couple were re-engaged and wed in a civil ceremony in 2022. The couple married in Hawaii on 27 July 2022. Fielding currently lives in both Dallas, Texas, and Kilchberg, Zürich, Switzerland.

In April 2025, Fielding announced that she plans to star in Kampf der Realitystars ("Battle of the Reality Stars"), a German reality TV series, starting on 7 May 2025.

== Family ==
Shawne Fielding's children are Roman Borer-Fielding (born May 27, 2003) and Ruby Borer-Fielding (born August 17, 2007). Her maternal grandfather is C. L. Sonnichsen, and her first cousin is Autumn Sonnichsen, a photographer based in New York and São Paulo.

== Residences ==
Fielding has resided in, and designed, restored and/or decorated the interior of the following historical residences:

- The Swiss Embassy in Berlin (Greek Revival)
- The UNESCO World Heritage Kampffmeyer Potsdam, Germany (Baroque and Rococo)
- A Texas Residence (Mission Revival)
- The Shawne Villa, Thalwil, Switzerland (Art Nouveau)

== Philanthropy ==
Fielding is also involved in philanthropy and charity work. She is currently President of the Swiss Foundation Kids with a Cause Europe. She was an ambassador for the SOS Children's Villages, Ambassador for the Swiss Expo.02 and honorary director of UNICEF Germany for special projects. She has been supporting the LGBT community since the early 1990s as a board member for AIDS Arms in Dallas, Texas, as the honorary chairman of DIFFA, and as an ambassador for AIDS Hilfe Schweiz.

== Selected filmography ==
The following are some of the TV series and films in which Fielding has appeared:

- Dr. T & the Women
- It's in the Water
- American Ninja Warrior
- Nachtcafé
- Taff
- Wetten, dass...?
- The Masked Singer Switzerland (November 2023)

== See also ==
- Unspunnenstein
