= Schwingen =

Swiss folk wrestling

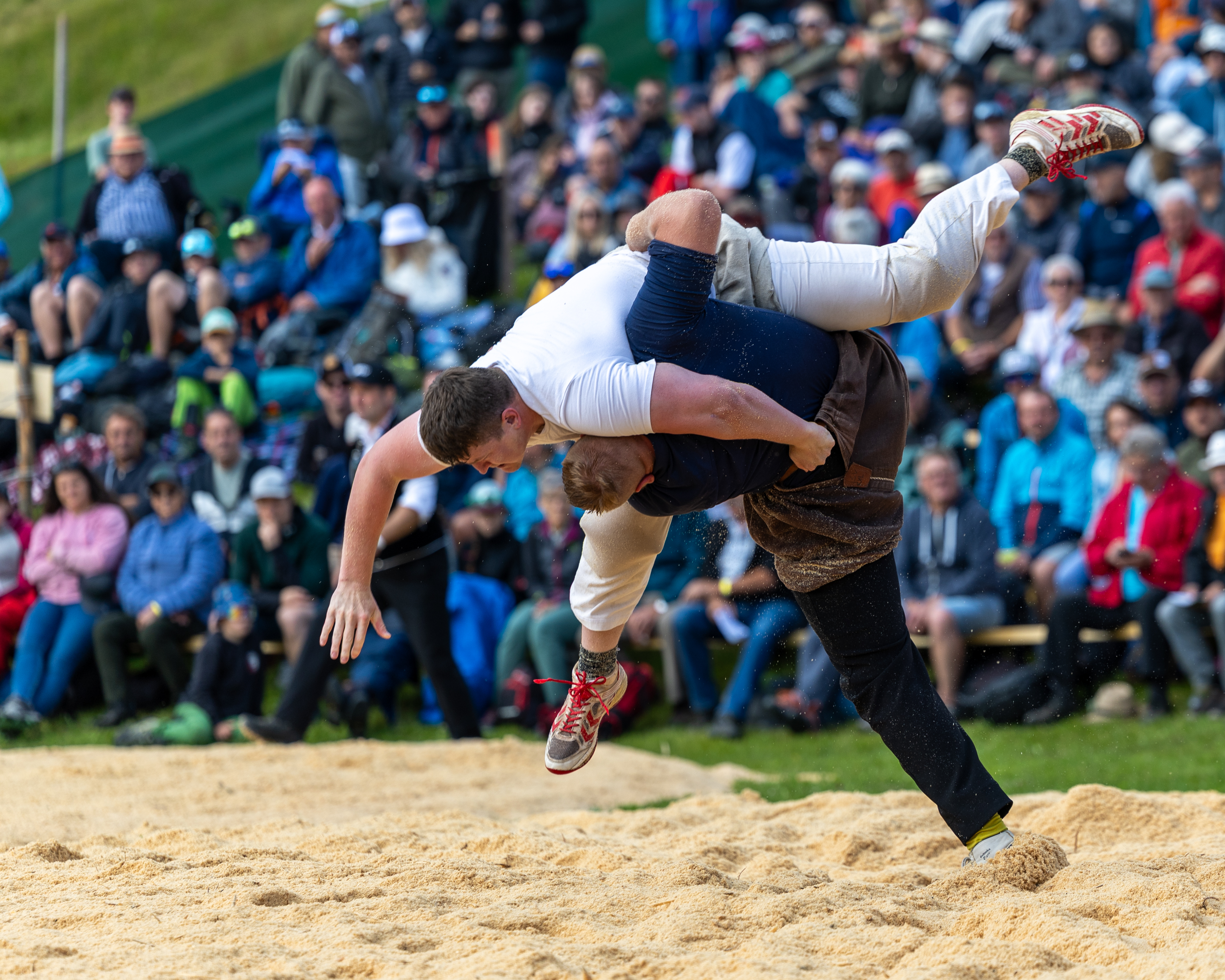
- Also known as: Swiss Wrestling Alpine wrestling Hosenlupf
- Focus: Grappling
- Country of origin: Switzerland
- Olympic sport: No

Schwingen (from German schwingen "to swing"), also known as Swiss wrestling (French lutte Suisse) and natively (and colloquially) as Hosenlupf (Swiss German for "breeches-lifting"), is a style of folk wrestling native to Switzerland, more specifically the pre-alpine parts of German-speaking Switzerland. Wrestlers wear Schwingerhosen ("wrestling breeches") with belts that are used for taking holds. Throws and trips are common because the first person to pin their opponent's shoulders to the ground wins the bout.

Schwingen is considered a "national sport" of Switzerland, alongside Hornussen and Steinstossen. Schwingen and Steinstossen were included as Nationalturnen ("national gymnastics") in the Eidgenössisches Turnfest at Lausanne in 1855.

The modern history of organized Schwingen tournaments begins with the Unspunnenfest of 1805.

== History ==
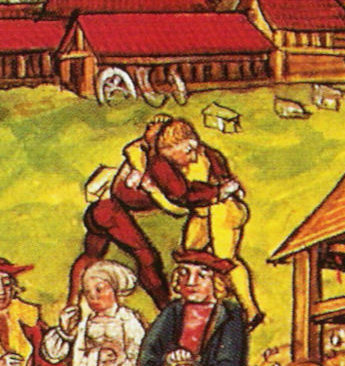
Wrestling match between two Swiss mercenaries. From the Luzerner Chronik of 1513 (detail of a page depicting idle mercenaries passing their time outside Einsiedeln while waiting to be paid).

As with other types of folk wrestling, the roots of Schwingen in Switzerland cannot be determined exactly. The modern sport was institutionalized in the 19th century out of older, regional traditions.

There are records of wrestling in Switzerland from the medieval period. A picture from the 13th century (in the Cathedral of Lausanne) shows the typical way of gripping the opponent.

Schwingen as a special form of grappling in Alpine culture can be traced to the early 17th century. This form of grappling is preserved during the 17th and 18th century in the Emmental, Haslital and Entlebuch regions specifically. In 18th century travel literature, Schwingen figures as part of the stereotypes of Swiss alpine culture. The Entlebuch pastor Franz Josef Stalder in 1797 records a set of rules in his Fragmente über Entlebuch.

The modern history of the sport begins during the period of Mediation, with the Unspunnenfest of 1805. In the late 19th century, memorable Schwing festivals and a lively activity of educated gymnastics teachers brought Schwingen to the big cities. Thus the original fight of the herders and farmers became a national sport that reached all social levels. The associations, headed by the Eidgenössischer Schwingerverband (national federation, founded 1895), organized the sport by integrating regional peculiarities, improving the abilities of the fighters with teaching books and practices, and creating modern tournament rules.

== Tournament ==
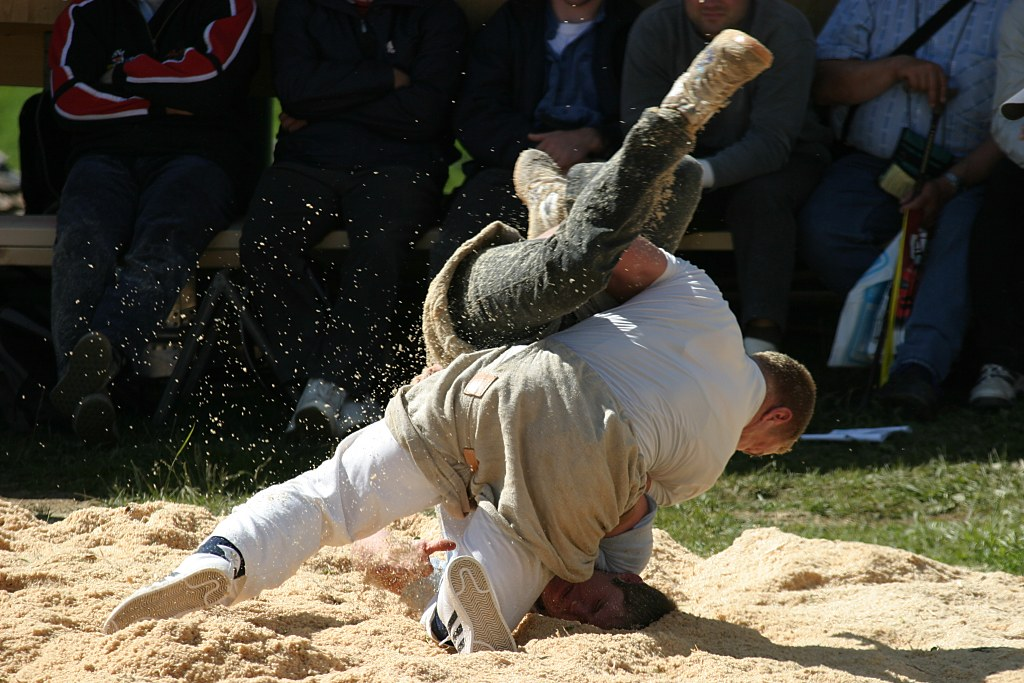
Turner Schwinger (dressed in white) and Sennen Schwinger Swiss Wrestling

The match takes place in a ring, a circular area with a diameter of 12 meters that is covered with sawdust. The two opponents wear short pants made of jute over their clothes. The wrestlers hold each other by these pants, at the back where the belt meets, and try to throw the opponent onto his back. There are several main throws, with names like "kurz", "übersprung" and "wyberhaagge", some of them very similar to judo techniques - "hüfter" is almost identical to koshi guruma, "brienzer" is basically uchi mata. These throws are found in many wrestling systems that have even the slightest emphasis on throwing the opponent, and can also been seen in shuaijiao. A match is won when the winner holds the opponent's pants with at least one hand and both the opponent's shoulders touch the ground. By tradition the winner brushes the sawdust off the loser's back after the match.

The match is judged by three referees, one of whom stands in the ring. The referees give points, with a maximum of ten points for a winning throw. If the match ends without a clear win, the more active Schwinger is awarded the higher number of points.

At a Schwing festival, every Schwinger wrestles six opponents, or eight at the Eidgenössische. The two Schwingers with the highest number of points after five (seven at the Eidgenössische) matches get to the Schlussgang (last round). The matching of the Schwingers is done by the fight court according to arcane rules. Often there are suspicions that the matchings have not been fair, and favor one contestant over the others.

There are no weight classes nor any other categories. Usually, though, Schwingers are big men, over 180 cm tall and weighing in excess of 100 kg, and are mostly craftsmen from traditional professions that require some physical force, like carpenters, butchers, lumberjacks or cheesemakers.

Regional and cantonal Schwing festivals are held outdoors, between early summer and autumn.

The most important Schwing festival is the Eidgenössisches Schwing- und Älplerfest (ESAF), which takes place every three years. The winner of this tournament is proclaimed Schwingerkönig and receives a bull as his prize.

=== List of tournaments and winners ===
A list of Eidgenössische tournaments with Schwingerkönig:

- 1937 Willy Lardon
- 1940 Otto Marti
- 1943 Willy Lardon
- 1945 Peter Vogt
- 1948 Peter Vogt
- 1950 Walter Haldemann
- 1953 Walter Flach
- 1956 Eugen Holzherr
- 1958 Max Widmer
- 1961 Karl Meli
- 1964 Karl Meli
- 1966 Rudolf Hunsperger
- 1969 Rudolf Hunsperger
- 1972 David Roschi
- 1974 Rudolf Hunsperger
- 1977 Arnold Ehrensberger
- 1980 Ernst Schläpfer
- 1983 Ernst Schläpfer
- 1986 Harry Knüsel
- 1989 Adrian Käser
- 1992 Silvio Rüfenacht
- 1995 Thomas Sutter
- 1998 Jörg Abderhalden
- 2001 Arnold Forrer
- 2004, Lucerne: Jörg Abderhalden
- 2007, Aarau: Jörg Abderhalden
- 2010, Frauenfeld: Kilian Wenger
- 2013, Burgdorf, Switzerland: Matthias Sempach
- 2016, Broye District: Matthias Glarner
- 2019, Zug: Christian Stucki
- 2022, Pratteln: Joel Wicki
- 2025, Mollis: Armon Orlik

== Traditions ==
Traditionally, Schwingen is a male sport. Women's Schwingen is a more recent phenomenon, and the Frauenschwingverband, or Women's Schwingen Association, was founded in 1992.

Members of a pure Schwingen club are called Sennenschwinger and wear dark trousers and a colored shirt, usually bright blue. Members of a broader sports club with a Schwingen section are called Turnerschwinger, and wear white pants and a white T-shirt.

Advertising and sponsoring are shunned at Schwingen. Successful Schwingers do not receive cash prizes, but goods such as cowbells, furniture or livestock.

The best Schwingers at a festival are awarded a wreath. Schwingers who receive a wreath at an Eidgenössische or national tournament are called Eidgenossen (confederates). Good Schwingers at national level are called "Böse" (wicked).

A winner of the Eidgenössische is given the lifetime title of Schwingerkönig (Schwinger king), which includes some privileges such as being a guest of honor at every Eidgenössische.

== Literature ==
- Urs Huwyler: Könige, Eidgenossen und andere Böse: Schwingen - ein Volkssport wird trendig, (Kings, Confederates and Other Wickeds - a Folk Sport Becomes Trendy) AT Verlag 2010, ISBN 978-3-03800-550-6
