= Michael Brander =

Michael William Brander (1924–2011), Scottish author.

== Career ==
Brander served with the 10th Royal Hussars in WWII in North Africa and Italy. He married Evelyn Jean Blanche Balfour in 1948. Brander lived at Whittingehame Tower in East Lothian.

He wrote over fifty books. After his death in 2011, his literary archive was gifted to the National Library of Scotland

== Works ==
- The Mark of Gleneil (1998).
- Essential Guide to the Highland Games (1992).
- The Emigrant Scots (1992).
- Tales of the Borders (Mainstream, 1991).
- The Making of the Highlands (Guild: BCA, 1980).
- Scottish Crafts and Craftsmen (1974).
- Original Scotch: A History of Scotch Whisky from the Earliest Days (Hutchinson, 1974).
- Ho For The Borders (London: Geoffrey Bles, 1964).
