= Unspunnen Castle =

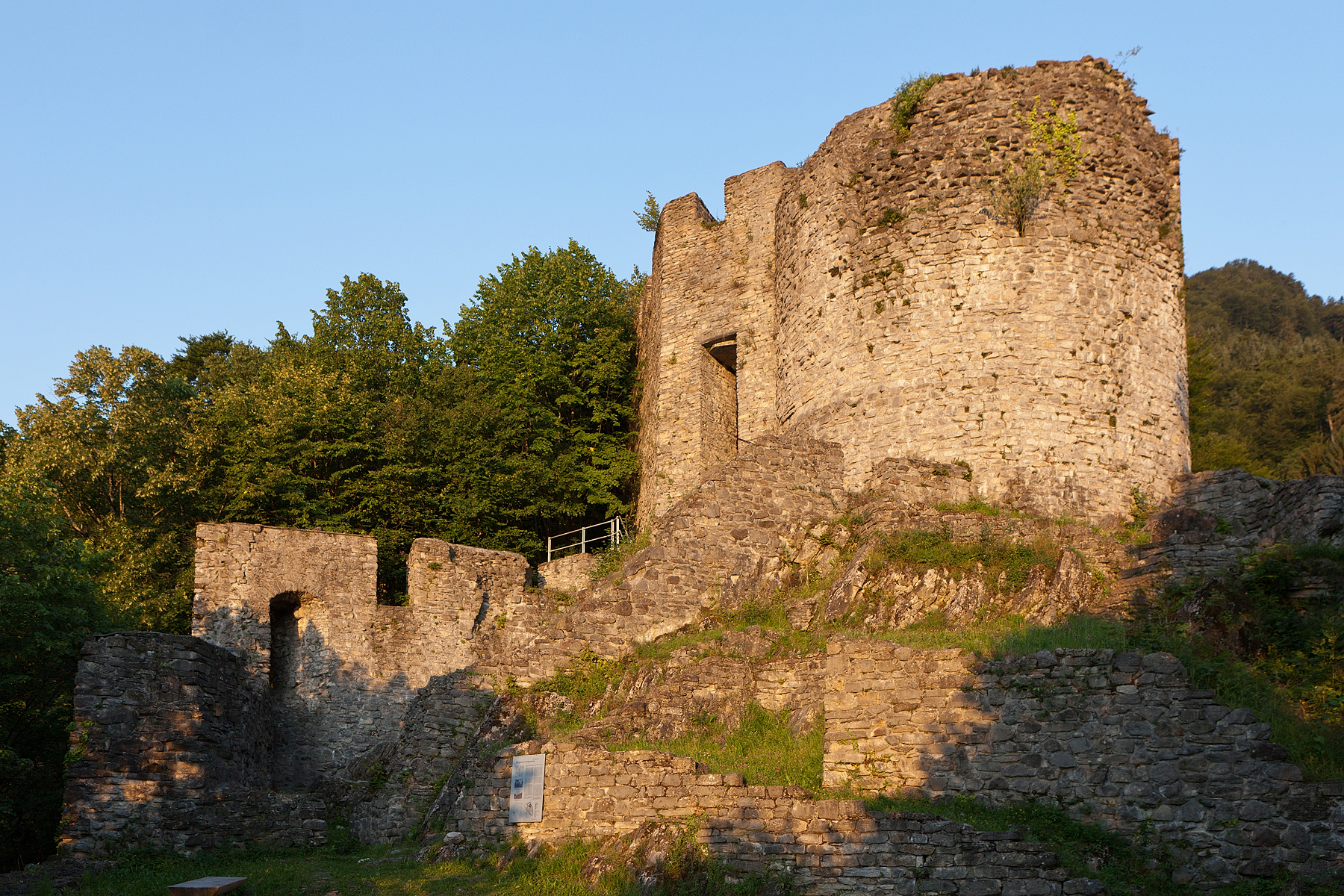

- Location within Switzerland
- 46°40′07″N 7°51′26″E
- Location: Wilderswil

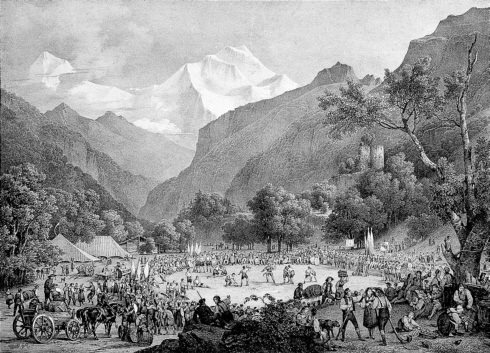
Engraving showing the 1805 Unspunnenfest under the ruins of Unspunnen Castle

Unspunnen Castle is a castle, now in ruins, located in the municipality of Wilderswil in the Bernese Highlands of Switzerland. The castle, likely constructed in the early 12th century, overlooks the city of Interlaken.

Today, Unspunnen is home to Unspunnenfest, a festival of traditional Swiss competitions held in the fields below the ruins.

== History ==
The castle was the center of a 13th–14th-century fief of an Oberland barons, though the name of the barons or the castle builder is unknown. The cave castle of Rotenfluh (first mentioned in 1298 as munitio immersive balma Rothenfluo dicta) at Tschingelsatz and Unspunnen Castle (first mentioned in 1232 as Uspunnun) were used to guard the late medieval Lütschinenbrücke, a bridge at Gsteig near Interlaken. In the 13th century it belonged to the Herrschaft of Burkart of Thun, who acquired it through his 1224 marriage to the family of the Baron of Wädenswil. A division of inheritance, possibly in 1280, cut the Herrschaft in half, the Baron of Eschenbach got the castle and the surrounding villages while the Baron of Weissenburg got Rotenfluh Castle along with other villages. After the assassination of Albert I of Germany by his nephew John in 1308 the Habsburg in Austria claimed the Eschenbach lands, but in 1318 they pledged these lands to the Baron of Weissenburg as collateral. In 1332, the peasants of the surrounding villages unsuccessfully rose up against Johann of Weissenburg and the leaders were imprisoned in the castle. In 1334, the Oberhasli region was invaded by Bern and the castle was besieged. After Bern took the castle, the prisoners were freed, though the barons retained the castle.

After the Bernese victory in the Battle of Laupen in 1339, the barons were forced to pledge the Unspunnen and Rotenfluh castles as part of the peace settlement. A few years later, in 1342, the Habsburgs redeemed this pledge and then pledged it on to their followers, including the lords of Interlaken, Hallwyl and Kyburg. During the Battle of Sempach in 1386, Bern occupied the area and in 1397 paid off the mortgage. In the next year they sold the castle and lands to the von Seftigen and von Scharnachtal families, who were citizens of Bern. In 1418 and again in 1515, Bern bought the lands back from the families' heirs. Bern placed the Unspunnen lands directly under the city's authority in 1529. In 1762 the lands were transferred to the administration of Interlaken and the castle was allowed to fall into disrepair. The ruins became famous through the Unspunnenfest in 1805 which led to regular cleaning and repairs of the ruins.
