= Hornussen =

Swiss sport

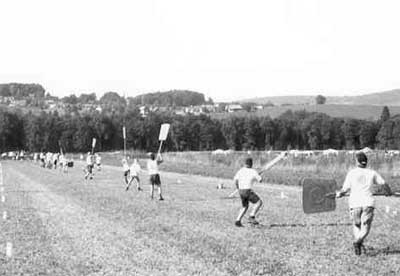
- Stopping the hornuss in flight

Presence
- Country or region: Switzerland
- Olympic: No
- Paralympic: No

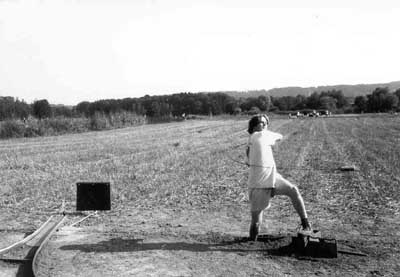
Hitting the hornuss

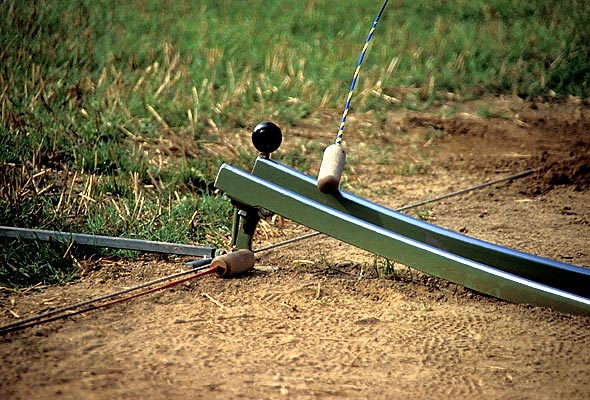
The hornuss on the bock

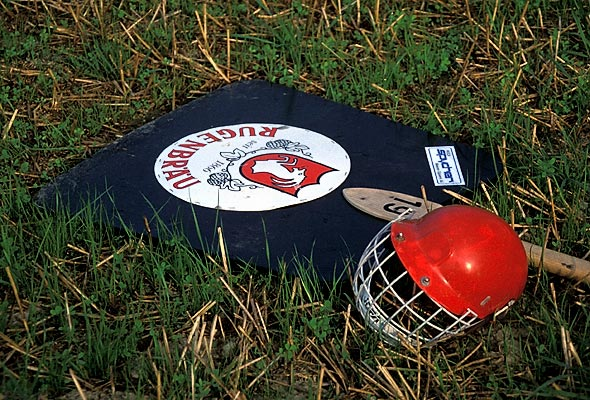
A schindel (shingle)

Hornussen is an indigenous Swiss sport played by two teams of 16 to 20 players which alternate in striking a puck known as a "Hornuss" (hornet) or "Nouss" and attempting to deflect it. When hit, the Hornuss can fly at up to 300 km/h (186.4 mph) and create a buzzing sound. Outside of Switzerland, there are few teams.

== History ==
The sport probably developed in the seventeenth century. The earliest reference to Hornuss is found in the records of 1625 of the consistory of Lauperswil, canton Bern, in a complaint about the breaking of the Sabbath. Two men were fined the sum of 20 francs for playing Hornussen on Sunday. The first recorded competitive Hornussen game occurred in 1655 in Trub. The sport appears in the 1841 Jeremias Gotthelf novel Uli, der Knecht. In the 19th century this amateur sport was very popular in the Emmental and in Entlebuch.

In 1902, the federal Hornussen association was founded, which organises a competition every three years. In 2011, there were around 270 clubs in the association, with around 8,300 members. During the season inter-association and inter-cantonal events are held, as well as group and elite events. The 40th Federal Hornussen Festival (Eidgenössisches Hornusserfest) was held in August 2024 in Höchstetten, canton of Bern, a village of about 300 inhabitants; 226 teams of 16 players competed on 32 playing fields, each 350 m (1,150 ft) long. To improve safety, helmets were made compulsory for players born in 1984 or later. The same year, hornussen was dropped from the programme of the Federal Wrestling and Alpine Festival (ESAF), where 20 teams had previously been allowed to compete.

In 2012, the international Hornussen association was founded, which helps promote the sport in countries throughout the world. Since its founding, more than 20 clubs have been founded in the United States.

== Gameplay ==
A game of Hornussen is played between two teams, each composed of between 16 and 20 players, that take turns in hitting the 78 g (2.8 oz) Nouss from the "Bock" and defending the trapezoidal playing field called Ries. The "Ries" begins 100 m (330 ft) from the "Bock" and is 180 m (590 ft) deep. Initially 8 m (26 ft) wide, it widens to 14 m (46 ft) at the far end. A pair of turns, one at the Bock and one in the Ries by each team forms a Durchgang ("transition"), analogous to an innings in sports such as baseball or cricket. A normal championship game is made up of two transitions, special events (such as the regional or inter-cantonal tournaments in autumn) might be different.

When playing from the Bock, each team member has to hit the Nouss twice per transition, for four hits in total. The further the Nouss flies in the Ries, the more points the player gets. The count starts at 100 meters, measured from the bock, and adds one point for every ten additional meters. The task of the defending team is to spot the Nouss in the sky and prevent it from touching the ground in the Ries by using a Schindel (shingle). Each Nouss which lands in the Ries awards one penalty point to the defending team.

In the end, the team with the fewest penalty points wins the game. If the two teams are tied (which happens often), the points of each player are added to form the team total. In this case, the team with the most points wins. Aside from the team score, each player is ranked according to his or her personal total from the four hits. At the end of the season, the best players are rewarded.
