= Unspunnenfest =

Festival held in the town of Interlaken, Switzerland

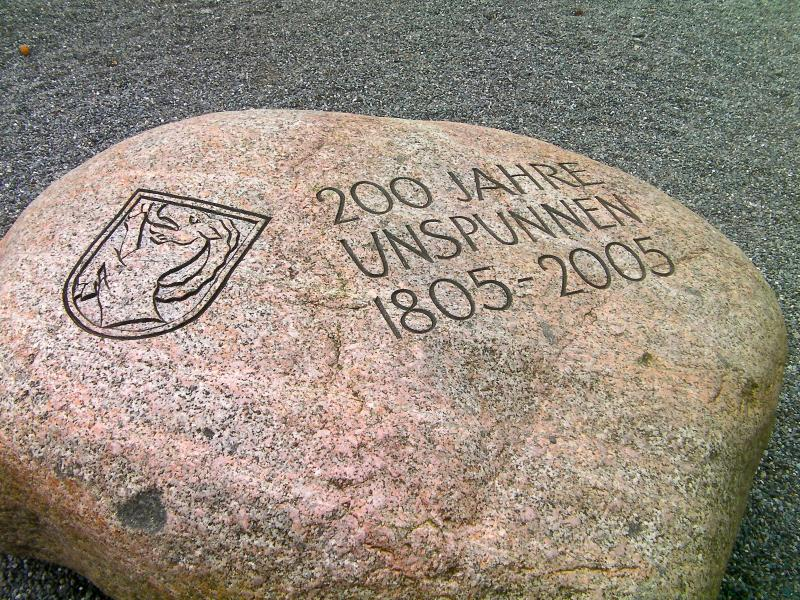
A marker commemorating the 200th anniversary of the Unspunnenfest

Unspunnenfest is a festival held in the town of Interlaken, Switzerland, near the old ruin of Unspunnen Castle, in the Bernese Alps, approximately once every twelve years, most recently in 2017. The festival highlights traditional Swiss culture and features competitions of Steinstossen (stone throwing), Schwingen (wrestling) and yodeling. The stone-throwing competition uses an 83.5 kg (184.1 lb) stone known as the Unspunnenstein ("Unspunnen Stone"), made of Aare granite from the Hasli valley.

== History ==
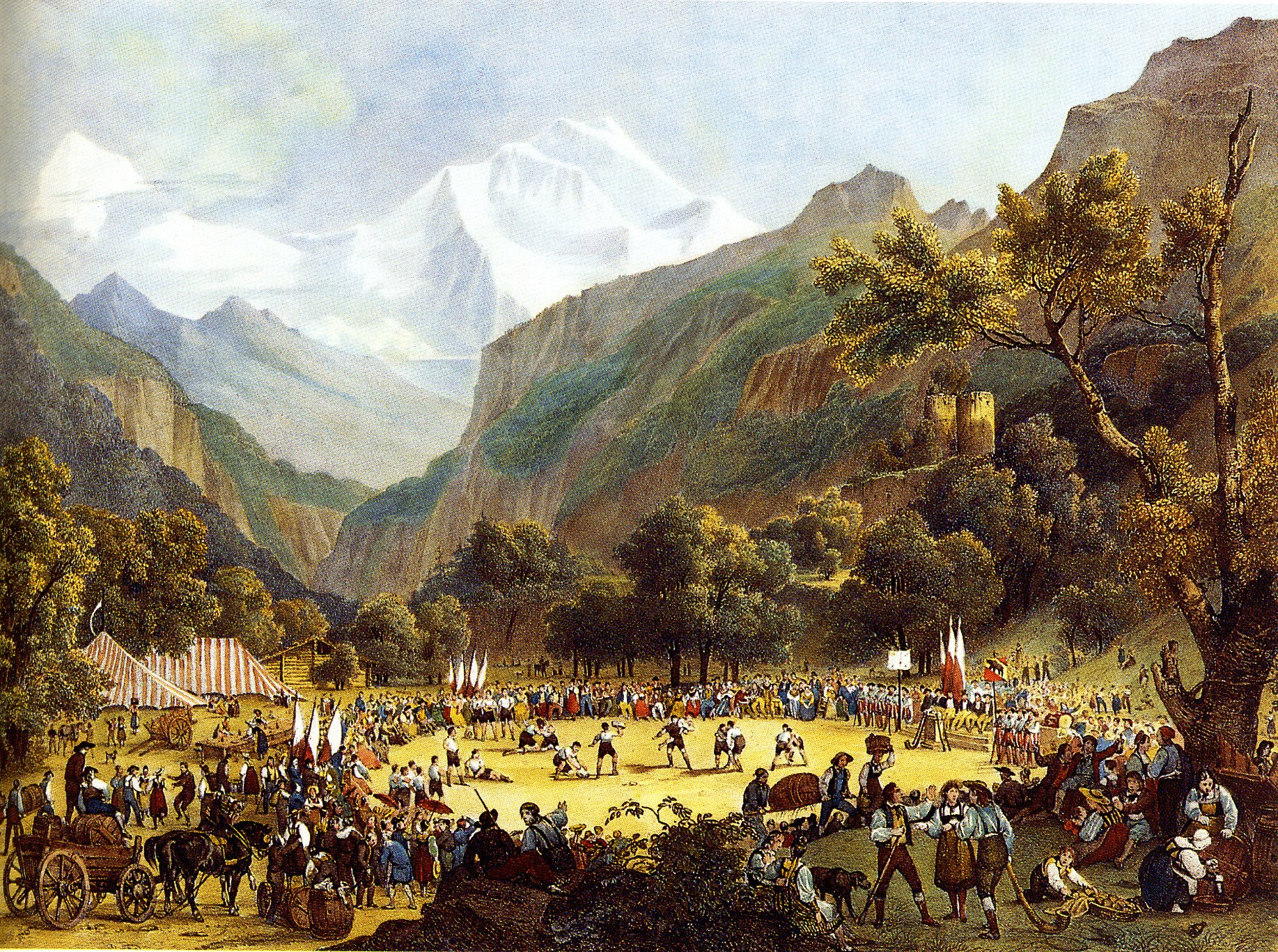
Depiction of Unspunnenfest in 1808

The history of the festival dates back to the 13th century, in the meadows of Unspunnen Castle, when local lord Burkard von Unspunnen and the founder of the city of Bern, Berchtold V von Zähringen were able to reconcile their differences.

The first official festival was held on 17 August 1805, in a similar effort: France had just invaded Switzerland, and the event was seen as a way of unifying the nation. Furthermore, the people of the Bernese Oberland had formed a separate canton in the Helvetic Republic, leading the Mayor of Bern, Niklaus Friedrich von Mülinen and Interlaken's chief magistrate, Franz Ludwig Thormann (and others) to organize this festival in an effort to bring both sides together. It was, unfortunately, not very successful in that regard, and conflicts continue to exist between rural and urban dwellers today. Culturally and financially, however, the first two festivals were a great success. The Swiss Heritage Society and the Swiss Traditional Costume Association owe their origins to the Unspunnen Festival.

A second competition was held in 1808, but the original 184 lb (83 kg) stone was lost in the intervening years, and the 1808 festival used a 167 lb (76 kg) stone. The third festival was not organized until the centenary in 1905, using the 1808 stone, now with the dates 1805 and 1905 carved into it. However, it was not until 1946 that the festival, then known as the Swiss Wrestling and Alpine Festival, was held at regular intervals. After 1946, the Unspunnenfest was staged at regular intervals: 1955, 1968, 1981 and 1993.

== Modern times ==
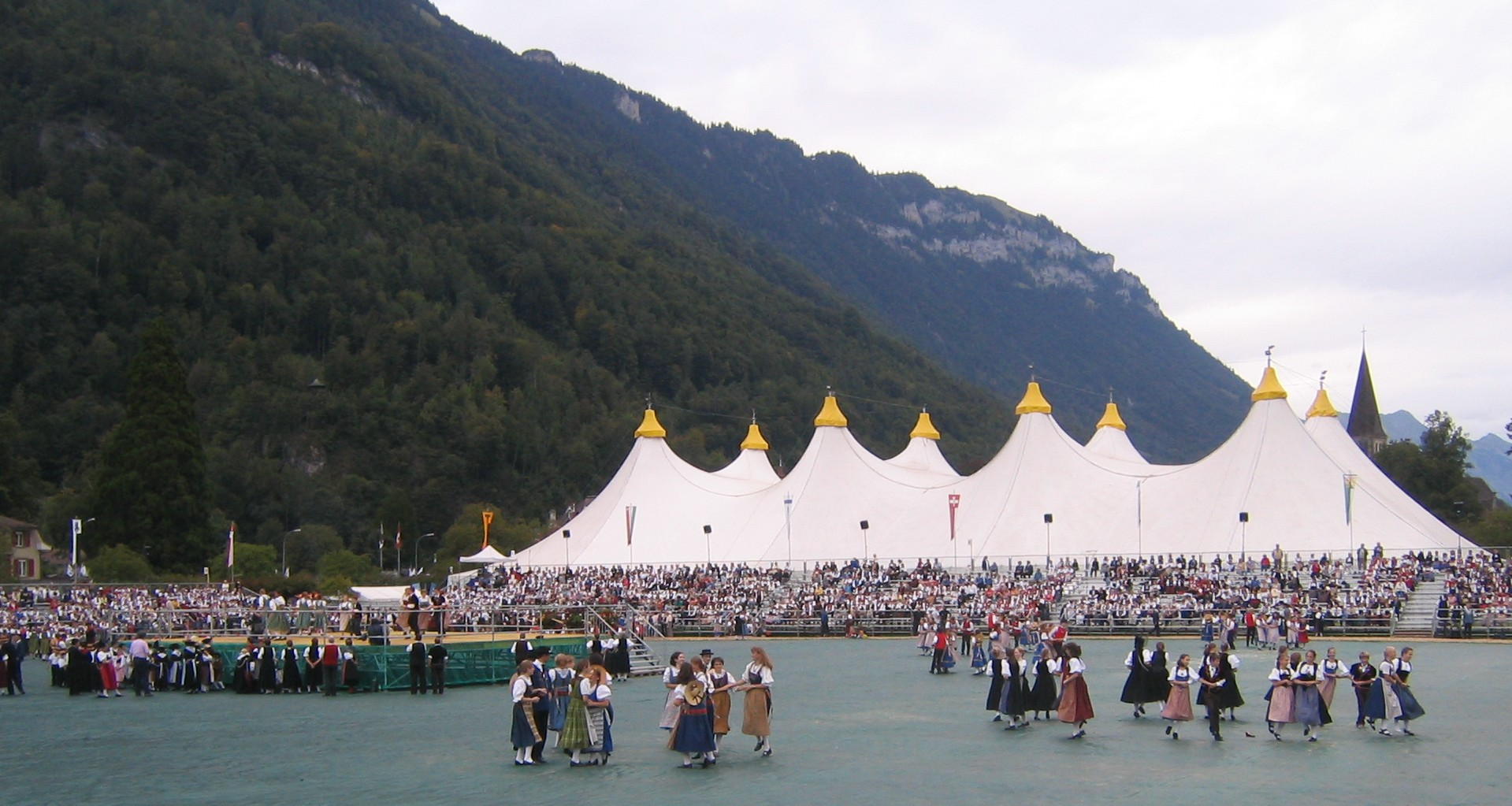
Unspunnenfest in 2006

In 1984, the 1808 stone was stolen by members of the Belier Group (Jura separatists) from Unterseen museum on Sunday 3 June 1984, and held as a "political hostage". A new stone was found, this one weighing 83.5 kg, similar to the 1805 stone, and has been used in all competitions since. This stone can currently be found in the counter hall of Interlaken UBS Bank.

In 1999, a photographer was led to a private residence in Brussels, where he was shown what was claimed to be the 1808 Unspunnenstein. He took photographs as evidence, which members of the Interlaken Gymnastic Club, who had commissioned the 1984 replacement stone, identified as authentic. The stone was delivered mysteriously to Shawne Fielding-Borer (American-born wife of the then Swiss ambassador to Berlin), packaged as confectionery, at a festival held in the village of Saignelégier, in the canton of Jura in August 2000. However, the stone had been damaged. Unhappy with the result of the Swiss national referendum in 1992, in which the Swiss population decided against participation to the European Economic Area (EEA), the Belier Group had engraved twelve stars in the stone, symbolising the European Union, as well as the date of the referendum, 6 December 1992, and their own emblem. As a result, the stone lost 2.3 kg (5.1 lb) in weight, and could no longer be used for competitions.

The 1808 stone was once again stolen on 20 August 2005 from a hotel in Interlaken. A small stone was left behind by the thieves bearing the emblem of Jura. The French-speaking separatists did not claim responsibility this time, but did issue a statement in support of the theft. Its whereabouts remain unknown.

Excessive flooding caused the next installment of Unspunnenfest to be postponed by a full year; it was finally held again in September 2006. The Steinstossen world record holder Swiss carpenter Markus Maire threw the 83.5 kg (184 lb) Unspunnenstein 3.89 metres (12 ft 9 in) and won the competition.

The most recent competition took place in 2017, and the next is scheduled for 2029.

== See also ==
- List of individual rocks
