= 1929 in Switzerland =

- Decades: 1900s; 1910s; 1920s; 1930s; 1940s
- See also: History of Switzerland; Timeline of Swiss history; List of years in Switzerland

The following is a list of events, births, and deaths in 1929 in Switzerland.

== Incumbents ==
- Federal Council:
  - Giuseppe Motta
  - Edmund Schulthess
  - Jean-Marie Musy
  - Heinrich Häberlin
  - Marcel Pilet-Golaz
  - Robert Haab (President) then Albert Meyer
  - Karl Scheurer then Rudolf Minger

== Events ==
- July 27
  - Geneva Convention (1929), also known as "Convention relative to the Treatment of Prisoners of War, Geneva July 27, 1929", is signed
  - Geneva Convention for the Amelioration of the Condition of the Wounded and Sick in Armies in the Field (1929) is signed
- The 1929 European Figure Skating Championships take place in Davos.
- 1928–29 Swiss Serie A
- 1929 UCI Road World Championships took place in Zurich
- 1929–30 Swiss Serie A
- Zürich Zoologischer Garten is established
- St. Moritz Ski School is founded by Giovanni Testa, and is the first official ski school in Switzerland

== Births ==
- March 25 – Marcel Mauron, footballer (died 2022)
- April 5 – Josef Schraner, cyclist
- May 22 – André Haefliger, mathematician (died 2023)
- 3 June – Werner Arber, microbiologist and geneticist
- June 20 – Marcel Flückiger, footballer (died 2010)
- July 28 – Werner Vetterli, modern pentathlete (died 2008)
- August 29 – Fausto Lurati, cyclist (died 2015)
- September 16 – Hans Pfenninger, cyclist (died 2009)
- September 19 – Luigi Taveri, motorcycle racer (died 2018)
- October 11 – Liselotte Pulver, actress
- October 25 – Charles Ribordy, fencer (died 2000)
- October 29 – Ida Schöpfer, skier (died 2014)
- December 6 – Alain Tanner, film director (died 2022)
- Marcel Roethlisberger, art historian (died 2020)
- Paolo Vollmeier, philatelist (died 2017)

== Deaths ==
- January 9 – Jacques-Louis Reverdin, surgeon (born 1842)
- March 13 – Elisabeth Flühmann, teacher and women's rights activist (born 1851)
- April 7 – Paul Sarasin, naturalist (born 1856)
- September 14 – John Maria Gatti, theatre manager, restaurateur and businessman (born 1872)
- November 14 – Karl Scheurer, politician (born 1872)
- Meta von Salis, feminist (born 1855)
