= 1928 in Switzerland =

- Decades: 1900s; 1910s; 1920s; 1930s; 1940s
- See also: History of Switzerland; Timeline of Swiss history; List of years in Switzerland

The following is a list of events, births, and deaths in 1928 in Switzerland.

== Incumbents ==
- Federal Council:
  - Giuseppe Motta
  - Edmund Schulthess (president)
  - Jean-Marie Musy
  - Heinrich Häberlin
  - Ernest Chuard (until December), then Marcel Pilet-Golaz
  - Robert Haab
  - Karl Scheurer

== Events ==
- 11–19 February – The Winter Olympics take place in St. Moritz.
- 28 October – In the 1928 Swiss federal election, the Social Democratic Party receives the most votes, but the Free Democratic Party remains the largest party in the National Council, winning 58 of the 198 seats.
- unknown date – The Maximag car ceases production in Switzerland.
- 1928–29 Swiss Serie A
- Postal Telegraph and Telephone (Switzerland)
- The first Schweizeische Ausstellung für Frauenarbeit (SAFFA, Swiss Exhibition for Women's Work) takes place in Bern.
- 1928 Swiss referendums

== Births ==
- 5 April – Maja Hug, figure skater (died 2023)
- 7 July – Paul Wyss, politician
- 29 August – Herbert Meier, author and translator (d. 2018)

== Deaths ==
- 31 March – Gustave Ador, politician (born 1845)
