= 1923 in Switzerland =

- Decades: 1900s; 1910s; 1920s; 1930s; 1940s
- See also: History of Switzerland; Timeline of Swiss history; List of years in Switzerland

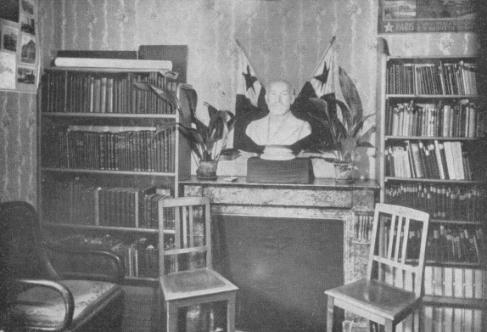
Library of the Universal Esperanto Association in 1923.

The following is a list of events, births, and deaths in 1923 in Switzerland.

== Incumbents ==
- Federal Council:
  - Karl Scheurer (president)
  - Giuseppe Motta
  - Edmund Schulthess
  - Jean-Marie Musy
  - Heinrich Häberlin
  - Robert Haab
  - Ernest Chuard

== Births ==
- 10 January – Henry Haller, Swiss-American chef (died 2020 in the United States)
- 10 March – Hedy Schlunegger, alpine skier (died 2003)
- 23 April – Eugen Huber, jurist and creator of the Swiss Civil Code (born 1849)
- 21 May – Armand Borel, mathematician (died 2003 in the United States)
- 4 July – Rudolf Friedrich, politician (died 2013)
- 18 December – Émile Knecht, rower (died 2019)
