= 1931 in Switzerland =

- Decades: 1910s; 1920s; 1930s; 1940s; 1950s
- See also: History of Switzerland; Timeline of Swiss history; List of years in Switzerland

The following is a list of events, births, and deaths in 1931 in Switzerland.

== Incumbents ==
- Federal Council:
  - Heinrich Häberlin (President)
  - Giuseppe Motta
  - Edmund Schulthess
  - Jean-Marie Musy
  - Marcel Pilet-Golaz
  - Albert Meyer
  - Rudolf Minger

== Events ==
- 19–23 February – The FIS Alpine World Ski Championships 1931 take place in Mürren.
- 1930–31 Swiss Serie A
- 1931–32 Nationalliga
- Football club FC Alle is established
- Football club FC Wettingen (later known as FC Wettingen 93) is established
- Swiss public broadcasting organisation SRG SSR is established
- 1931 Swiss referendums
- 1931 Swiss federal election
- The ladies and pairs events of the 1931 European Figure Skating Championships take place in St. Moritz.

== Births ==
- 1 February – Madeleine Berthod, alpine skier
- 4 May – Walter Leiser, rower (died 2023)
- 19 May – Éric Tappy, singer (died 2024)
- 4 July – Karl Weidmann, rower
- 3 September – Rudolf Kelterborn, musician and composer (died 2021)
- 10 October – Bruno Weber, artist and architect (died 2011)
- 14 October – Charles Weissmann, Hungarian-Swiss molecular biologist
- 30 November – Susi Wirz, figure skater

== Deaths ==
- 7 March – Theo van Doesburg, Dutch artist (born 1883 in the Netherlands)
- 31 March – Hermann Kutter, Lutheran theologian (born 1863)
- 27 July – Auguste Forel, myrmecologist, neuroanatomist and psychiatrist (born 1848)
- 5 November – Konrad Stäheli, sports shooter (born 1866)
- Jakob Herzog, socialist (born 1892)
- Friedrich Ris, physician and entomologist (born 1867)
- Eugen Sutermeister, graveur and writer (born 1862)
