= 1930 in Switzerland =

- Decades: 1910s; 1920s; 1930s; 1940s; 1950s
- See also: History of Switzerland; Timeline of Swiss history; List of years in Switzerland

The following is a list of events, births, and deaths in 1930 in Switzerland.

== Incumbents ==
- Federal Council:
  - Giuseppe Motta
  - Edmund Schulthess
  - Jean-Marie Musy (President)
  - Heinrich Häberlin
  - Marcel Pilet-Golaz
  - Albert Meyer
  - Rudolf Minger

== Events ==
- 6 April – Swiss alcohol referendum, 1930
- 12 April – FC Wangen bei Olten is founded
- 1929–30 Swiss Serie A
- 1930–31 Swiss Serie A
- Vita Nova, a Swiss publishing house run is established in January 1934.
- FIBT World Championships 1930 takes place in Switzerland
- Bank for International Settlements was founded, based in Basel

== Births ==
- 8 March – Franz Gertsch, painter (died 2022)
- 30 May – Yolande Jobin, figure skater (died 2010)
- 29 June – Hans Däscher, ski jumper
- 11 August – André Thomkins, artist (died 1985)
- 30 September – Gilbert Albert, jeweler (died 2019)
- 30 October – Gilbert Rey, footballer
- 16 November – Frieda Dänzer, alpine skier (died 2015)

== Deaths ==
- 19 March – Andreas Walser, painter (born 1908)
- 27 July – Alfred Friedrich Bluntschli, architect and educator (born 1842)
- 4 August – Sebastian Gebhard Messmer, prelate of the Catholic Church (born 1847)
- Heinrich Anton Müller, painter (born 1869)

== Literature ==
- Solal of the Solals published
