= 1924 in Switzerland =

- Decades: 1900s; 1910s; 1920s; 1930s; 1940s
- See also: History of Switzerland; Timeline of Swiss history; List of years in Switzerland

The following events, births, and deaths happened in Switzerland in the year 1924.

== Incumbents ==
- Federal Council:
  - Ernest Chuard (president)
  - Giuseppe Motta
  - Edmund Schulthess
  - Jean-Marie Musy
  - Heinrich Häberlin
  - Robert Haab
  - Karl Scheurer

== Births ==
- 3 March – Lys Assia, singer (died 2018)
- 17 March – Hans Bänninger, ice hockey player (died 2007)
- 24 June – Kurt Furgler, politician (died 2008)
- 8 October – Alphons Egli, politician (died 2016)

== Deaths ==
- 29 December – Carl Spitteler, poet (died 1845)
