= 1932 in Switzerland =

- Decades: 1910s; 1920s; 1930s; 1940s; 1950s
- See also: History of Switzerland; Timeline of Swiss history; List of years in Switzerland

The following is a list of events, births, and deaths in 1932 in Switzerland.

== Incumbents ==
- Federal Council:
  - Giuseppe Motta (President)
  - Edmund Schulthess
  - Jean-Marie Musy
  - Heinrich Häberlin
  - Marcel Pilet-Golaz
  - Albert Meyer
  - Rudolf Minger

== Events ==
- June 16–July 9 – Lausanne Conference of 1932 is held in Switzerland
- September 8 – Tannenberg, a Swiss-German war film, is released
- 1931–32 Nationalliga
- Switzerland at the 1932 Summer Olympics
- Switzerland at the 1932 Winter Olympics
- 1932–33 Nationalliga
- Geneva Conference (1932) is held

== Births ==
- January 9 – Émile Ess, rower, (died 1990)
- February 11 – Kurt Schmid, rower (died 2000)
- April 9 – Armin Jordan, conductor, (died 2006)
- July 20 – Alice Fischer, figure skater (died 2017)
- July 29
  - Walter Loosli, sculptor, woodcut engraver and maker of stained and painted glass panels and windows (died 2015)
  - Luigi Snozzi, architect (died 2020)
- August 21 – Kurt Stettler, football goalkeeper (died 2020)
- November 2 – Clemens Thoma, theologian (died 2011)
- November 4 – Katia Loritz, actress (died 2015)
- December 5 – Ludwig Minelli, founder of Dignitas (died 2025)
- December 21 – Werner Otto Leuenberger, painter, illustrator, graphic artist and sculptor (died 2009)
- December 29 – Cornelio Sommaruga, Italian-born Swiss humanitarian, lawyer and diplomat (died 2024)
- Emilie Benes Brzezinski, Swiss-born American sculptor (died 2022)

== Deaths ==
- November 12 – Edmond Louis Budry, hymn writer (born 1854)
- Louis Mercanton, Swiss film director, screenwriter and actor (born 1879)
