= 1933 in Switzerland =

- Decades: 1910s; 1920s; 1930s; 1940s; 1950s
- See also: History of Switzerland; Timeline of Swiss history; List of years in Switzerland

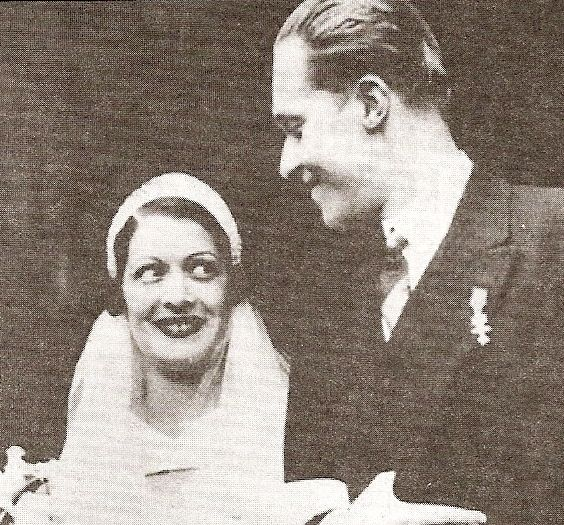
Picture of the Count and Countess of Covadonga on their wedding day in 1933.

The following is a list of events, births, and deaths in 1933 in Switzerland.

== Incumbents ==
- Federal Council:
  - Giuseppe Motta
  - Edmund Schulthess (President)
  - Jean-Marie Musy
  - Heinrich Häberlin
  - Marcel Pilet-Golaz
  - Albert Meyer
  - Rudolf Minger

== Events ==
- Berne Trial is in progress until 1935
- 1932–33 Nationalliga
- 1933–34 Nationalliga
- Schurter is established (incorporated 1949)
- Giro del Mendrisiotto, a Swiss bike race, is founded
- Tour de Suisse, a Swiss bike race, is founded
- Integra-Signum, a Swiss train protection system, is established

== Births ==
=== January ===
- January 6 – Emil Steinberger, comedian, director and writer
- January 28 – Fred Mayer, photographer

=== February ===
- February 27 – Livio Vacchini, architect (died 2007)

=== March ===
- March 14 – René Felber, politician (died 2020)
- March 27 – Oskar von Büren, cyclist

=== June ===
- June 6 – Heinrich Rohrer, physicist (died 2013)
- June 11 – Harald Szeemann, curator and art historian (died 2005)
- June 12 – Elisabeth Nagele, luger
- June 18 – Heinrich von Stietencron, German indologist (died 2018 in Germany)
- June 22 – André Grobéty, association footballer
- June 22 – Peter Brogle, actor (died 2006)

=== July ===
- July 13 – Henri Lauener, philosopher (died 2002)
- July 25 – Elwyn Friedrich, ice hockey player (died 2012)

=== August ===
- August 14 – Richard R. Ernst, physical chemist and Nobel Laureate (died 2021)
- August 29 – Arnold Koller, politician

=== September ===
- September 8 – Marcel Vonlanthen, association football forward

=== October ===
- October 25 – René Brodmann, association football defender

=== December ===
- December 18 – Rene Haller, naturalist
- December 24 – Renée Colliard, alpine skier (died 2022)

== Deaths ==
- April 28 – Hermann Sahli, internist (born 1856)
- Victor Sterki, malacologist (born 1846)
