= 1925 in Switzerland =

- Decades: 1900s; 1910s; 1920s; 1930s; 1940s
- See also: History of Switzerland; Timeline of Swiss history; List of years in Switzerland

The following is a list of events, births, and deaths in 1925 in Switzerland.

== Incumbents ==
- Federal Council:
  - Jean-Marie Musy (president)
  - Ernest Chuard
  - Giuseppe Motta
  - Edmund Schulthess
  - Heinrich Häberlin
  - Robert Haab
  - Karl Scheurer

== Births ==
- 3 February – Leon Schlumpf, politician (died 2012)
- 22 May – Jean Tinguely, sculptor (died 1991)

== Deaths ==
- 14 January – Camille Decoppet, politician (born 1862)
- 31 January – Ulrich Wille, military leader (born 1848 in Germany)
