= 1920 in Switzerland =

- Decades: 1900s; 1910s; 1920s; 1930s; 1940s
- See also: History of Switzerland; Timeline of Swiss history; List of years in Switzerland

Events during the year 1920 in Switzerland.

== Incumbents ==
- Federal Council:
  - Giuseppe Motta (president)
  - Edmund Schulthess
  - Robert Haab
  - Karl Scheurer
  - Jean-Marie Musy
  - Ernest Chuard
  - Heinrich Häberlin

== Events ==
- 10 January – The League of Nations is established with Switzerland as one of its founding members and its headquarters established in Geneva.
- 15 November – The first convention of the League of Nations takes place in Geneva with 41 member states in attendance.

== Births ==
- 19 June – Antoinette Meyer, alpine skier (died 2010)
- 24 December – Edy Reinalter, alpine skier (died 1962 in Austria)

== Deaths ==
- 12 February – Adolf Frey – writer and historian (born 1855)
