= 1927 in Switzerland =

- Decades: 1900s; 1910s; 1920s; 1930s; 1940s
- See also: History of Switzerland; Timeline of Swiss history; List of years in Switzerland

Events during the year 1927 in Switzerland.

== Incumbents ==
- Federal Council:
  - Giuseppe Motta (president)
  - Edmund Schulthess
  - Jean-Marie Musy
  - Heinrich Häberlin
  - Ernest Chuard
  - Robert Haab
  - Karl Scheurer

== Events ==
- The pharmaceutical company Galenica is established.

== Births ==
- 10 January – Otto Stich, politician (died 2012)
- 20 April – K. Alex Müller, physicist (died 2023)

== Deaths ==
- 23 July – Arthur Hoffmann, politician (born 1857)
