= 1934 in Switzerland =

- Decades: 1910s; 1920s; 1930s; 1940s; 1950s
- See also: History of Switzerland; Timeline of Swiss history; List of years in Switzerland

The following is a list of events, births, and deaths in 1934 in Switzerland.

== Incumbents ==
- Federal Council:
  - Giuseppe Motta
  - Edmund Schulthess
  - Jean-Marie Musy then Philipp Etter
  - Heinrich Häberlin then Johannes Baumann
  - Marcel Pilet-Golaz (President)
  - Albert Meyer
  - Rudolf Minger

== Events ==
- July 14–July 29 – Zürich 1934 chess tournament took place
- August 26 – 1934 Swiss Grand Prix takes place in Switzerland
- 1933–34 Nationalliga
- FIBT World Championships 1934 took place in Switzerland
- FIS Alpine World Ski Championships 1934 took place in Switzerland
- 1934-35 Nationalliga
- SC Buochs
- The Berne Trial is in progress, until 1935
- The Swiss Banking Act of 1934 majorly affects bank secrecy
- 16–17 December – The 1934 Montreux Fascist conference a meeting held by deputies from a number of European Fascist organizations is held in Montreux, Switzerland.

== Literature ==
- Via Mala is published

== Births ==
- February 11 – Hans Bässler, fencer
- February 14 – Michel Corboz, conductor
- February 15 – Niklaus Wirth, computer scientist
- February 18 – Peter Zeindler, journalist, novelist and playwright.
- February 21 – Andreas Blum, journalist, actor (d. January 26, 2024)
- June 18 – Eugen Meier, composer
- June 30 – Ursula Bagdasarjanz, violinist
- August 13 – Karl Elsener, football goalkeeper (d. July 27, 2010)
- October 19 – Ernst Hürlimann, rower
- November 19 – Paul Glass, American-Swiss composer
- Kurt Müller, sports shooter

== Deaths ==
- August 26 – Hugh Hamilton, British racing driver, killed at the Swiss Grand Prix (born 1905 in Ireland)
- César Roux, surgeon (born 1857)
