= 1918 in Switzerland =

- Decades: 1890s; 1900s; 1910s; 1920s; 1930s
- See also: History of Switzerland; Timeline of Swiss history; List of years in Switzerland

Events during the year 1918 in Switzerland.

== Incumbents ==
- Federal Council:
  - Felix Calonder (president)
  - Eduard Müller
  - Giuseppe Motta
  - Edmund Schulthess
  - Camille Decoppet
  - Gustave Ador
  - Robert Haab

== Events ==
- 30 September – All workers in major banks in Zürich walk out in protest over salaries and the rising cost of living.
- 12–14 November – A general strike takes place.

== Births ==
- 9 January – Willy Gysi, handball player (died 2001)
- 28 January – Rudolf Wirz, handball player (died 1988)
- 28 September – Willi Ritschard, politician (died 1983)
- 9 October – Willy Hufschmid, handball player

== Deaths ==
- 19 May – Ferdinand Hodler, painter (born 1853)
- 29 June – Adrien Lachenal, politician (born 1849)
