= 1914 in Switzerland =

- Decades: 1890s; 1900s; 1910s; 1920s; 1930s
- See also: History of Switzerland; Timeline of Swiss history; List of years in Switzerland

Events during the year 1914 in Switzerland.

== Incumbents ==
- Federal Council:
  - Arthur Hoffmann (president)
  - Felix Calonder
  - Eduard Müller
  - Giuseppe Motta
  - Edmund Schulthess
  - Camille Decoppet
  - Ludwig Forrer

== Events ==
- 31 July – Swiss Air Force established.
- 1 August – Swiss National Park established.

== Births ==
- 12 February – Nello Celio, politician (died 1995)
- 10 March – Ernst Brugger, politician (died 1989)

== Deaths ==
- 16 March – Charles Albert Gobat, politician (born 1843)
