= 1855 in Switzerland =

- Decades: 1830s; 1840s; 1850s; 1860s; 1870s
- See also: History of Switzerland; Timeline of Swiss history; List of years in Switzerland

The following is a list of events, births, and deaths in 1855 in Switzerland.

== Incumbents ==
- Federal Council:
  - Jakob Stämpfli
  - Jonas Furrer (President)
  - Josef Munzinger
  - Henri Druey then Constant Fornerod
  - Friedrich Frey-Herosé
  - Wilhelm Matthias Naeff
  - Stefano Franscini

== Events ==
- ETH Zurich, the Federal Polytechnic, opens
- Botanist Carl Meissner gives Grevillea ramosissima its current name and first describes Grevillea thyrsoides
- The Oberwinterthur railway station and Winterthur main railway station open
- The Swiss Benevolent Society of New Orleans is founded
- Switzerland opens a consulate in Sydney, Australia

== Arts and literature ==
- Green Henry is first published

== Births ==
- February 18 – Adolf Frey, writer and literary historian (d. 1920)
- July 16 – Rodolphe Lindt, chocolate manufacturer and inventor (d. 1909)
- September 16 – Eugène Penard, biologist (d. 1954)
- December 19 – Carl Joseph Schröter, botanist (d. 1939)
- Arnold Lang, naturalist (d. 1914)
- Meta von Salis, feminist and historian (d. 1929)

== Deaths ==
- February 6 – Josef Munzinger, member of the Swiss Federal Council (b. 1791)
- March 29 – Henri Druey, member of the Swiss Federal Council (b. 1799)
