= 2016 in Switzerland =

- Decades: 1990s; 2000s; 2010s; 2020s
- See also: History of Switzerland; Timeline of Swiss history; List of years in Switzerland

The following lists events that happened during 2016 in Switzerland.

== Incumbents ==
- Federal Council:
  - Doris Leuthard
  - Guy Parmelin
  - Ueli Maurer
  - Didier Burkhalter
  - Johann Schneider-Ammann (President)
  - Simonetta Sommaruga
  - Alain Berset

== Events ==
- April 2–April 11 – The 2016 World Men's Curling Championship takes place in Basel.
- June 1 – The Gotthard Base Tunnel, the world's longest and deepest railway tunnel, is opened following two decades of construction work.
- December 18–December 19 – An attacker murders one man before shooting 3 people at an Islamic center in downtown Zürich.

== Deaths ==
- 31 January – Benoît Violier, French-Swiss chef (born 1971 in France)
- 5 August – Alphons Egli, politician (born 1924)
