= 2021 in Switzerland =

- Decades: 2000s; 2010s; 2020s
- See also: History of Switzerland; Timeline of Swiss history; List of years in Switzerland

Events from the year 2021 in Switzerland.

== Incumbents ==
- President of the Swiss Confederation: Guy Parmelin
- President of the National Council: Andreas Aebi
- President of the Swiss Council of States: Alex Kuprecht

== Events ==
Ongoing — COVID-19 pandemic in Switzerland

- 1 January – The municipality of Val de Bagnes is created as a merge between the communes of Bagnes and Vollèges.
- 1 January – The Center (German: Die Mitte; French: Le Centre; Italian: Alleanza del Centro; Romansh: Allianza dal Center) is formed through the merger of the Christian Democratic People's Party of Switzerland and the Conservative Democratic Party of Switzerland.
- 7 March – In a March 2021 referendum, Swiss voters approved a nationwide ban on full facial coverings in public places, with over 51% of the electorate supporting it.

== Deaths ==
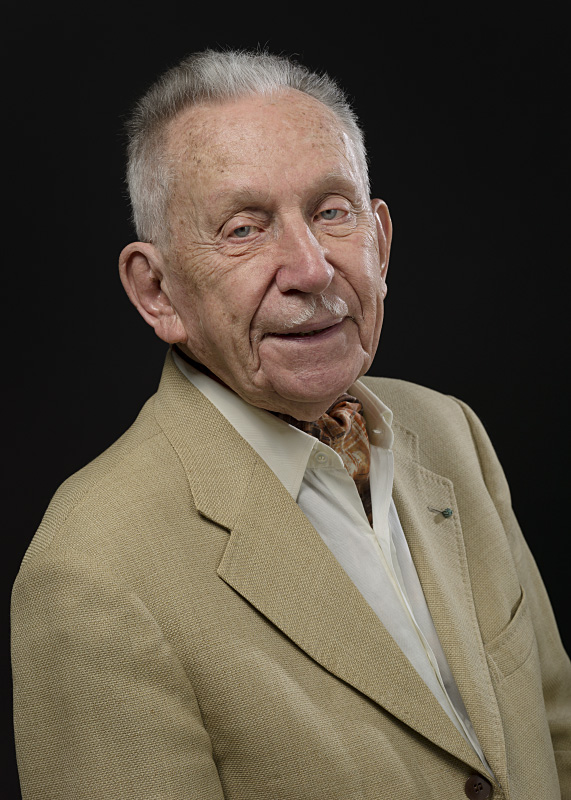
Julien-François Zbinden

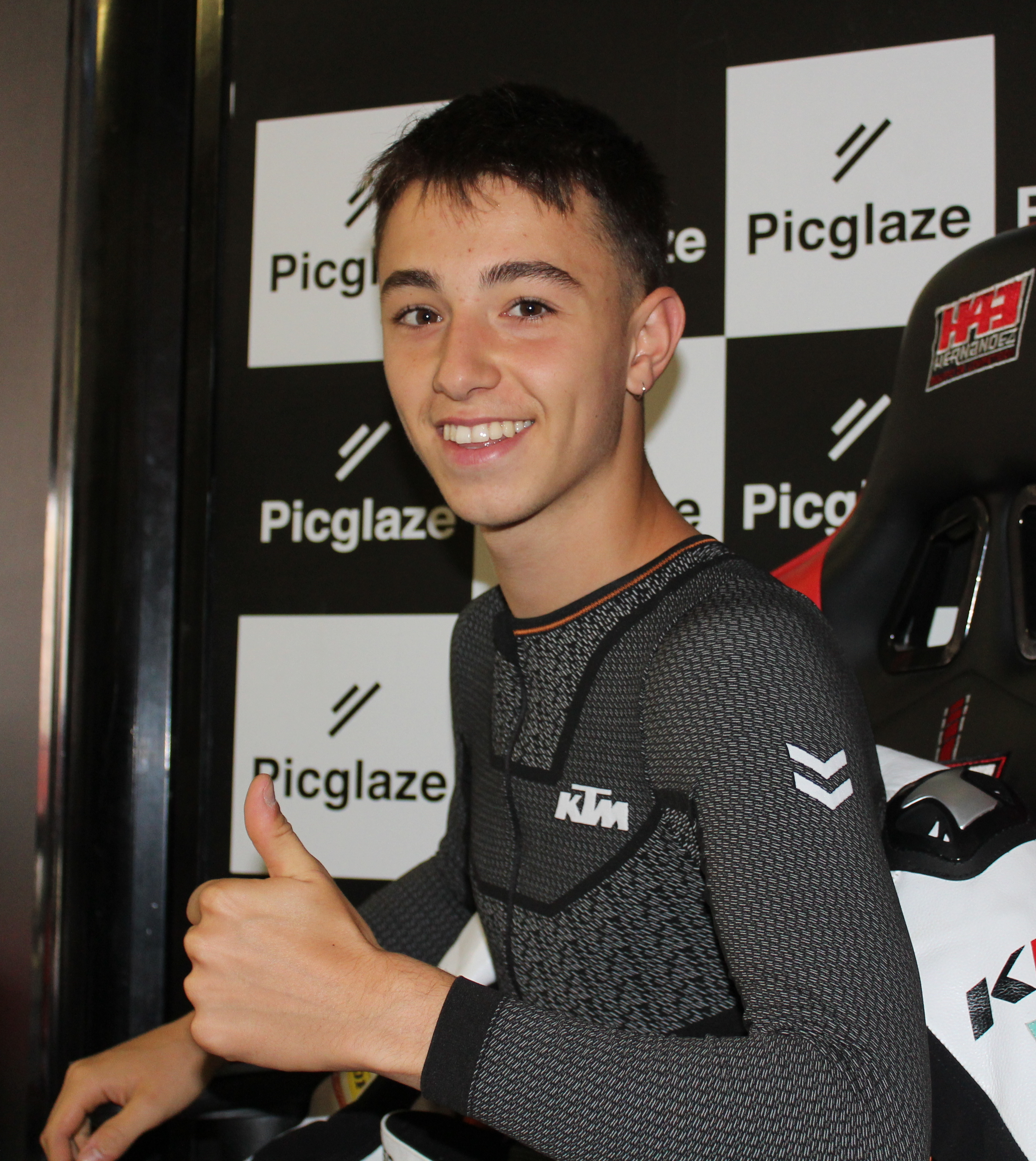
Jason Dupasquier

- 7 January – Henri Schwery, Roman Catholic cardinal, Bishop of Sion (born 1932)
- 11 January – Paul Kölliker, rower (born 1932)
- 22 January – Jacqueline Berenstein-Wavre, politician and activist (born 1921)
- 29 January – Robert Heuberger, businessman (born 1922)
- 5 February – Sepp Benz, bobsledder (born 1944)
- 8 March – Julien-François Zbinden, composer and jazz pianist (born 1917)
- 30 May – Jason Dupasquier, motorcycle road racer (born 2001)
- 4 June – Richard R. Ernst, physical chemist and Nobel Laureate (born 1933)
