= 1857 in Switzerland =

- Decades: 1830s; 1840s; 1850s; 1860s; 1870s
- See also: History of Switzerland; Timeline of Swiss history; List of years in Switzerland

The following is a list of events, births, and deaths in 1857 in Switzerland.

== Incumbents ==
- Federal Council:
  - Jakob Stämpfli
  - Jonas Furrer
  - Josef Munzinger
  - Constant Fornerod (President)
  - Friedrich Frey-Herosé
  - Wilhelm Matthias Naeff
  - Stefano Franscini then Giovanni Battista Pioda

== Events ==
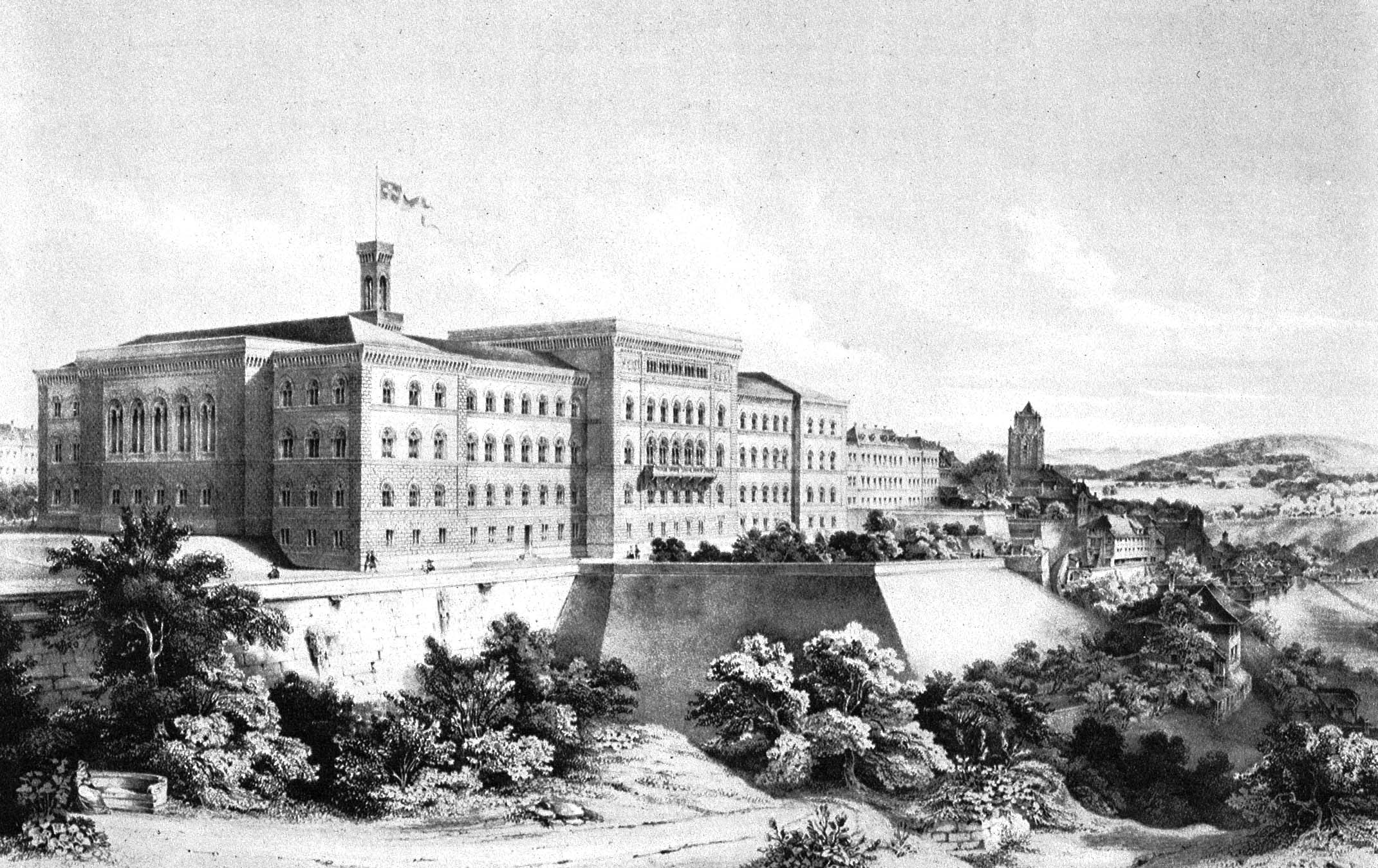
The first Federal Palace in 1857.

- Hansli Kopp discovers La Tène culture artifacts
- Hugo Schiff leaves Germany for Switzerland due to political turmoil
- A conference between France, the United Kingdom, Prussia, and Russia ends the Neuchâtel Crisis as Prussia yields its claim to the principality
- The first Federal Palace completes construction

== Arts and literature ==
- Horizons prochains by Madame de Gasparins is published

== Births ==
- March 14 – Rudolf Thurneysen, linguist and Celticist (d. 1940)
- June 18 – Arthur Hoffmann, politician (d. 1927)
- July 12 – Amé Pictet, chemist (d. 1937)
- July 31 – Ernest Chuard, politician (d. 1942)
- August 13 – Henri François Pittier, geographer and botanist (d. 1950)
- November 26 – Ferdinand de Saussure, linguist (d. 1913)
- César Roux, surgeon (d. 1934)

== Deaths ==
- July 19 – Stefano Franscini, member of the Swiss Federal Council (b. 1796)
