= 1856 in Switzerland =

- Decades: 1830s; 1840s; 1850s; 1860s; 1870s
- See also: History of Switzerland; Timeline of Swiss history; List of years in Switzerland

The following is a list of events, births, and deaths in 1856 in Switzerland.

== Incumbents ==
- Federal Council:
  - Jakob Stämpfli (President)
  - Jonas Furrer
  - Josef Munzinger
  - Constant Fornerod
  - Friedrich Frey-Herosé
  - Wilhelm Matthias Naeff
  - Stefano Franscini

== Events ==
- November 7 – Eterna is founded
- Ernest Borel is founded
- Carl Meissner discovers Conospermum mitchellii
- A revolt by Neuchâtel royalists sparks the Neuchâtel Crisis.
- Credit Suisse is founded
- Gregory Haas and John Frey, two Swiss diocesan priests, arrive on Mt. Calvary after leaving Switzerland and establish a Capuchin Order in the United States
- The first part of the Olten–Lausanne railway line is opened
- Samuel Francis is relocated to Geneva to oversee the emigration of Latter-day Saints to the United States from Switzerland
- Switzerland opens a diplomatic consulate in Melbourne, Australia
- Arnold Escher von der Linth becomes a professor of geology at the École Polytechnique in Zurich

== Births ==
- April 7 – Ferdinand Schiess, recipient of the Victoria Cross (d. 1884)
- May 23 – Hermann Sahli, internist (d. 1933)
- December 6 – Louise Catherine Breslau, artist (d. 1927)
- December 9 – Ernst Brenner, politician (d. 1911)
- December 11 – Paul Sarasin, naturalist (d. 1929)

== Deaths ==
- William Bally, sculptor (b. c. 1799)
