= Usteri =

Usteri is a surname. Notable people with the surname include:

- Paul Usteri (1768–1831), Swiss physician, botanist, publicist, and politician
- Paul Emil Usteri (1853–1927), Swiss politician
