= 2020 in Switzerland =

- Decades: 2000s; 2010s; 2020s
- See also: History of Switzerland; Timeline of Swiss history; List of years in Switzerland

Events in the year 2020 in Switzerland.

== Incumbents ==
- President of the Swiss Confederation: Simonetta Sommaruga
- President of the National Council: Isabelle Moret
- President of the Swiss Council of States: Hans Stöckli

== Events ==
- 9 February – Scheduled date for the first voting in the 2020 Swiss referendums
- 1 to 2 February – Scheduled date for the 2020 UCI Cyclo-cross World Championships, to be held in Dübendorf
- 28 April to 3 May – Scheduled date for the road cycling stage race 2020 Tour de Romandie, to be held in Switzerland
- 25 August 2020 – Raphaël Domjan jumps out of the SolarStratos HB-SXA solar plane in Payerne, Switzerland, with test pilot Miguel Iturmendi in command of the plane, the first jump off of an electric plane and the first free fall in solar history. He dropped several hundred meters and reached a speed of 150kmh.

== Deaths ==
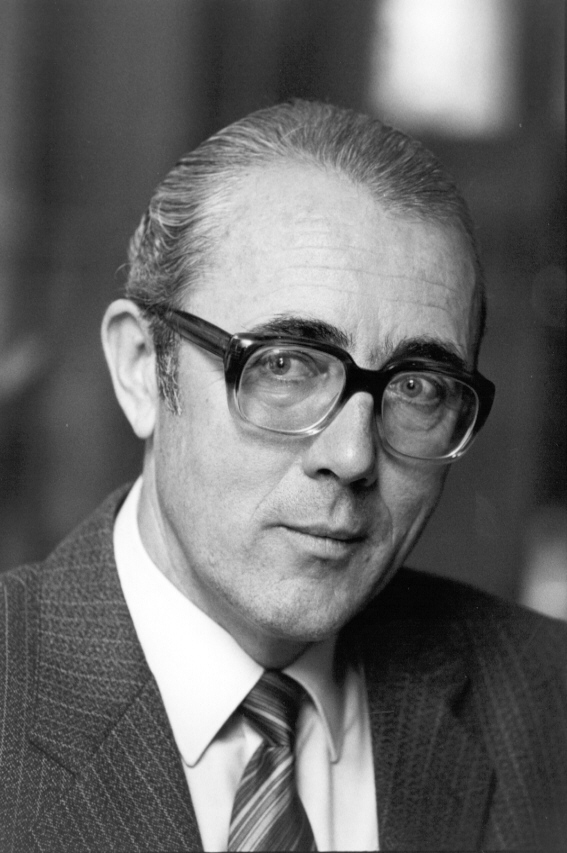
Martin Bundi

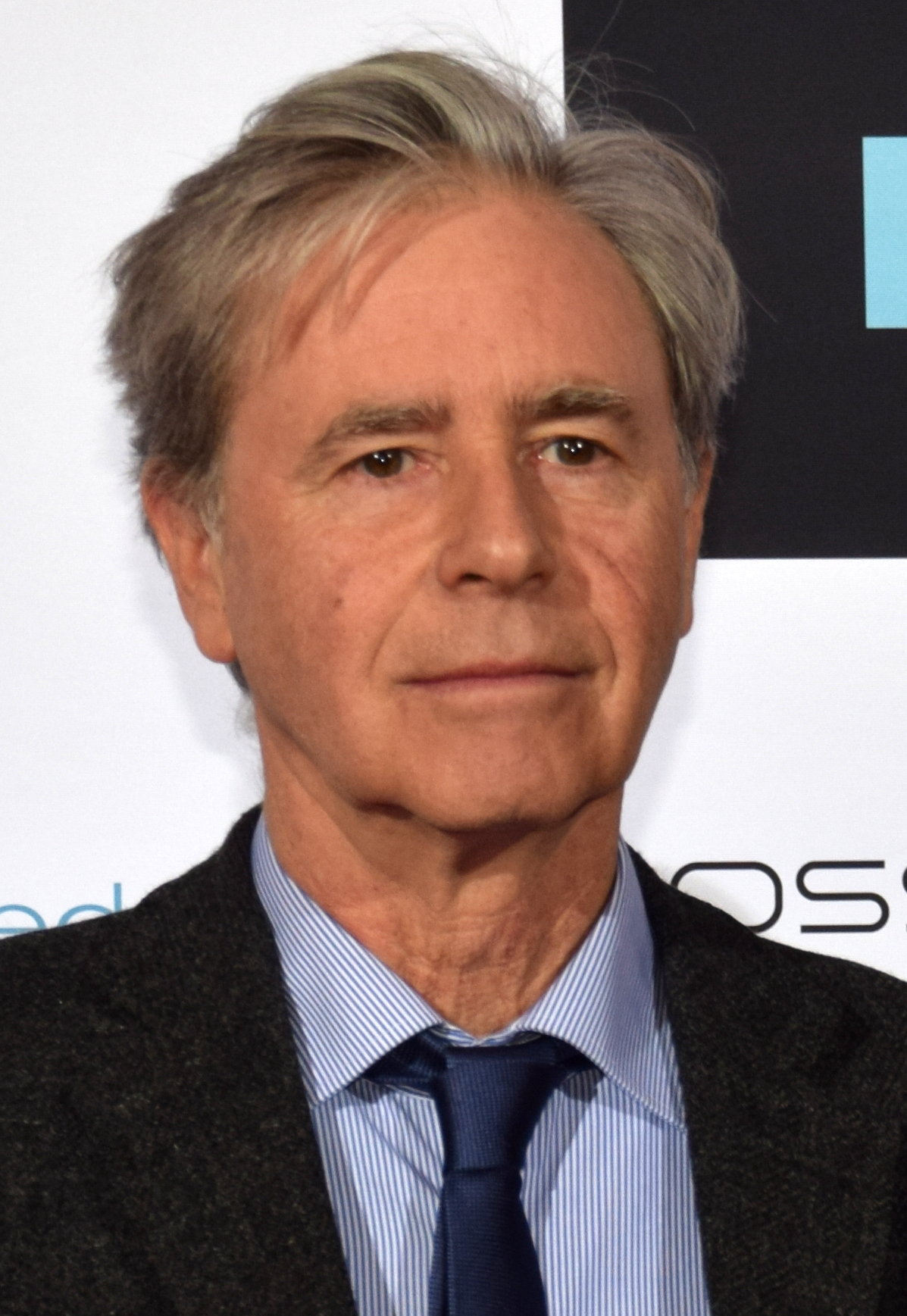
Urs Egger

- 1 January – Martin Bundi, historian and politician (born 1932)
- 7 January – Fritz Hans Schweingruber, dendrochronologist (born 1936)
- 19 January – Urs Egger, film director (born 1953)
- 24 January – Aenne Goldschmidt, expressionist dancer and choreographer (born 1920)
- 18 October – René Felber, politician (born 1933)
- 16 December – Flavio Cotti, politician (born 1939)
