= 2014 in Switzerland =

- Decades: 1990s; 2000s; 2010s; 2020s
- See also: History of Switzerland; Timeline of Swiss history; List of years in Switzerland

The following lists events that happened during 2014 in Switzerland.

== Incumbents ==
- Federal Council:
  - Doris Leuthard
  - Eveline Widmer-Schlumpf
  - Ueli Maurer
  - Didier Burkhalter (President)
  - Johann Schneider-Ammann
  - Simonetta Sommaruga
  - Alain Berset

== Events ==
=== January ===
- January 20 – World leaders are meeting in Davos for the World Economic Forum.

=== February ===
- February 9 – 50.3% of voters vote in favor of the federal popular initiative "against mass immigration", to re-introduce quotas of immigrants for foreigners.

=== April ===
- April 6 – Holcim agrees to a merger that would create a firm with a market value of $55 billion with LaFarge of France.

=== May ===
- May 18 – Voters in Switzerland resoundingly reject a proposed law change that would have given that country the world's highest minimum wage.

=== August ===
- August 12–17 – The 2014 European Athletics Championships take place in Zürich.
- August 13 – Three train cars derail and 11 people are injured after a landslide hits a mountain train in the Swiss Alps.

=== November ===
- November 13 – A spokeswoman for the public prosecutor in Switzerland confirms existence of open criminal investigations regarding several people who may have taken part in manipulation of the currency exchange markets; such investigations are also underway in the United States and Britain.
- November 16 – At least four people are killed in mudslides in southern Switzerland and northern Italy after days of heavy rain.
- 22–29 November – The 2014 European Curling Championships take place in Champéry.
- November 30 – 2014 Swiss referendums
  - Voters in Switzerland (74%) reject the proposal to reduce immigration from about 80,000 to 16,000 people a year.
  - By a similar margin Swiss voters rejected a monetary-policy initiative that would have required the central bank to buy gold.
