= Josef Winiger =

Swiss politician

Josef Winiger (24 January 1855 – 9 August 1929) was a Swiss politician and President of the Swiss Council of States (1910/1911).

Preceded by Paul Emil Usteri	President of the Council of States; 1910/1911	Succeeded by Felix Calonder
