= 2013 in Switzerland =

- Decades: 1990s; 2000s; 2010s; 2020s
- See also: History of Switzerland; Timeline of Swiss history; List of years in Switzerland

Events from 2013 in Switzerland.

== Incumbents ==
- Federal Council:
  - Doris Leuthard
  - Eveline Widmer-Schlumpf
  - Ueli Maurer (President)
  - Didier Burkhalter
  - Johann Schneider-Ammann
  - Simonetta Sommaruga
  - Alain Berset

== Events ==
- 2 January – A man opens fire on people in the village of Daillon, Valais, killing 3 and wounding 2.
- 27 February – A man opens fire at a wood-processing plant in Menznau killing 5 people, including the shooter.
- September – By popular referendum approved by 66% of the voters, the canton of Ticino prohibited to hide the face in a public area. it become the first canton in Switzerland to ban it.

== Deaths ==
- 16 May – Heinrich Rohrer, physicist (born 1933)

== See also ==
- Public holidays in Switzerland
