= 2017 in Switzerland =

- Decades: 1990s; 2000s; 2010s; 2020s
- See also: History of Switzerland; Timeline of Swiss history; List of years in Switzerland

Events in the year 2017 in Switzerland.

== Incumbents ==
- President of the Swiss Confederation: Doris Leuthard
- President of the National Council: Jürg Stahl
- President of the Swiss Council of States: Ivo Bischofberger

== Events ==
=== Referendums ===
- Referendums were held on 12 February, 21 May and 24 September 2017.

=== Sport ===
- 2016–17 Swiss Handball League
- 2017 Geneva Open
- 2017 Stan Wawrinka tennis season
- 2017 World Mixed Curling Championship
- 2017 Yellow Cup
- 2016–17 Championnat LNA season
- 2016–17 Championnat LNA season
- 2017–18 Swiss Basketball League
- The Best FIFA Football Awards 2016
- 2017 European Curling Championships
- 2017 European Masters (curling)
- FIS Alpine World Ski Championships 2017
- 2017 Katusha–Alpecin season
- 2017 Ladies Championship Gstaad
- 2017 Ladies Open Biel Bienne
- 2017 FIBA 3x3 World Tour – Lausanne Masters
- 2017 Montreux Volley Masters
- 2017 Montreux Volley Masters squads
- 2017 Swiss Indoors
- 2017 Swiss Open Grand Prix Gold
- 2017 Swiss Open Gstaad
- Switzerland at the 2017 World Aquatics Championships
- Switzerland at the 2017 World Games
- 2017 Tour de Romandie
- 2016–17 Tour de Ski
- 2017–18 Tour de Ski
- 2017 Tour de Suisse
- Switzerland at the 2017 World Championships in Athletics

=== Pop Culture ===
- Switzerland in the Eurovision Song Contest 2017

=== Other ===
- A landslide hit the town of Bondo, killing 8 people.

== Deaths ==
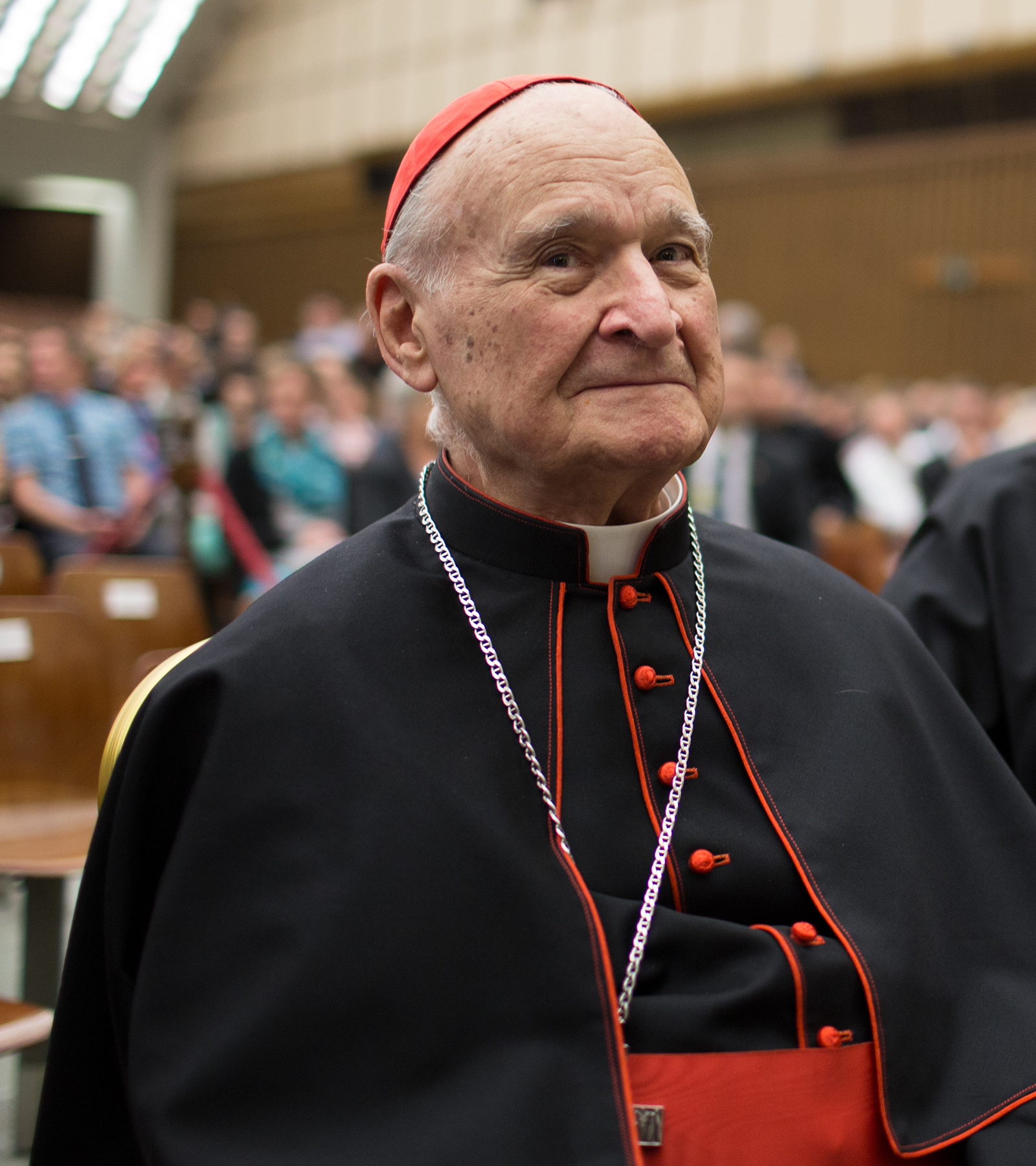
Gilberto Agustoni

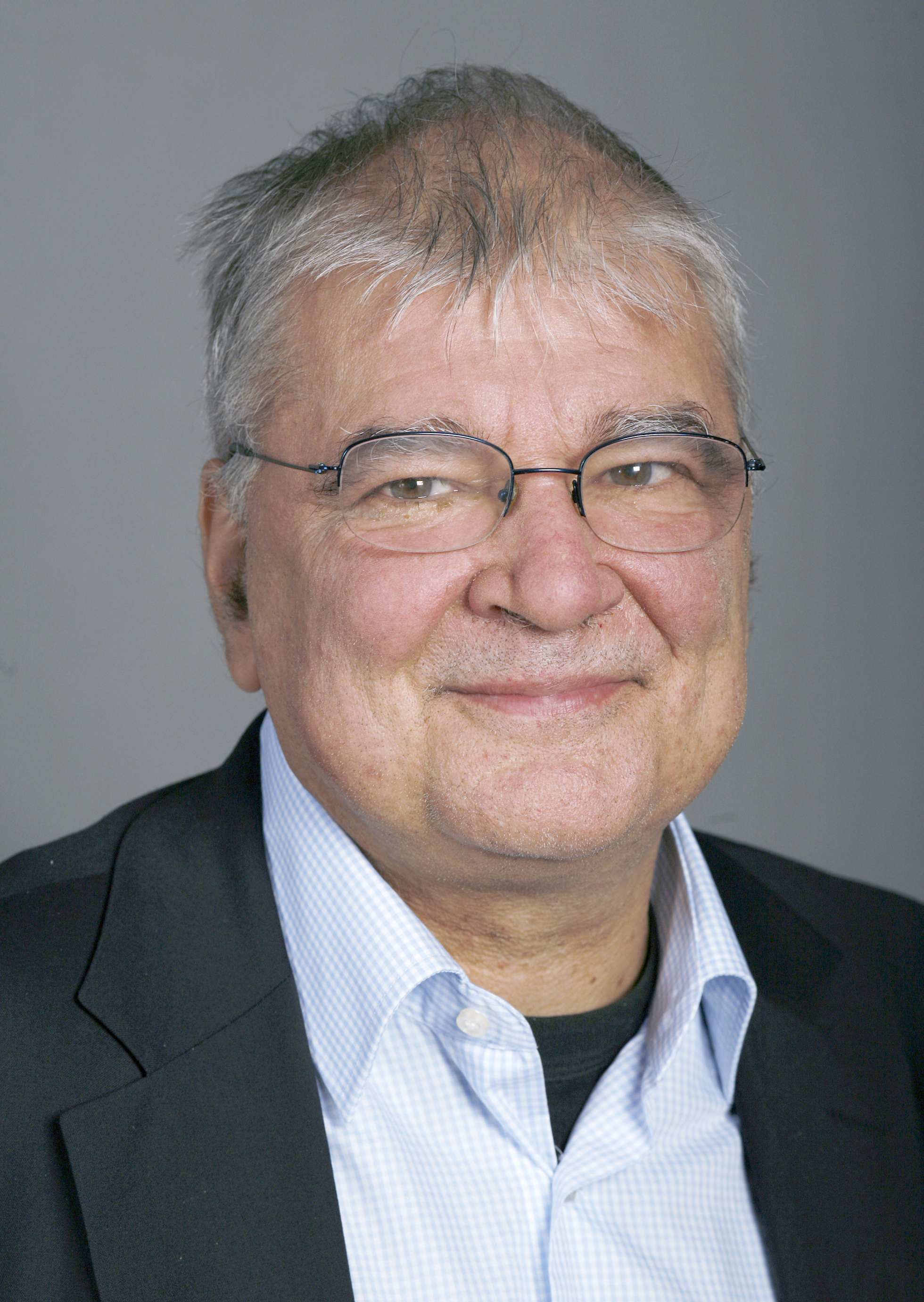
Daniel Vischer

- 1 January – Karl Gerstner, typographer (b. 1930)
- 8 January – Dominique Appia, painter (b. 1926)
- 13 January – Gilberto Agustoni, prelate (b. 1922)
- 17 January – Daniel Vischer, politician (b. 1950)
- 18 January – Samuel Widmer, physician, psychiatrist and psychotherapist (b. 1948)
- 30 April – Ueli Steck, rock climber (b. 1976)
