= 2019 in Switzerland =

- Decades: 1990s; 2000s; 2010s; 2020s
- See also: History of Switzerland; Timeline of Swiss history; List of years in Switzerland

Events in the year 2019 in Switzerland.

== Incumbents ==
- President of the Swiss Confederation: Ueli Maurer
- President of the National Council: Marina Carobbio Guscetti
- President of the Swiss Council of States: Jean-René Fournier

== Events ==
- 22 September — A 'funeral' and mourning ceremony was held for the Pizol glacier which has disappeared due to rising temperatures.
- 20 October – Scheduled date for the 2019 Swiss federal election
- 25 November – present 2019 Sri Lankan Swiss embassy controversy.

=== Sports ===
- 1 January – Stage 3 of 2018–19 Tour de Ski was held in Val Müstair
- 19 to 25 August – Scheduled date for the 2019 BWF World Championships, to be held in Basel
- 7 to 15 December – Scheduled date for the 2019 Women's World Floorball Championships, to be held in Neuchâtel

== Deaths ==
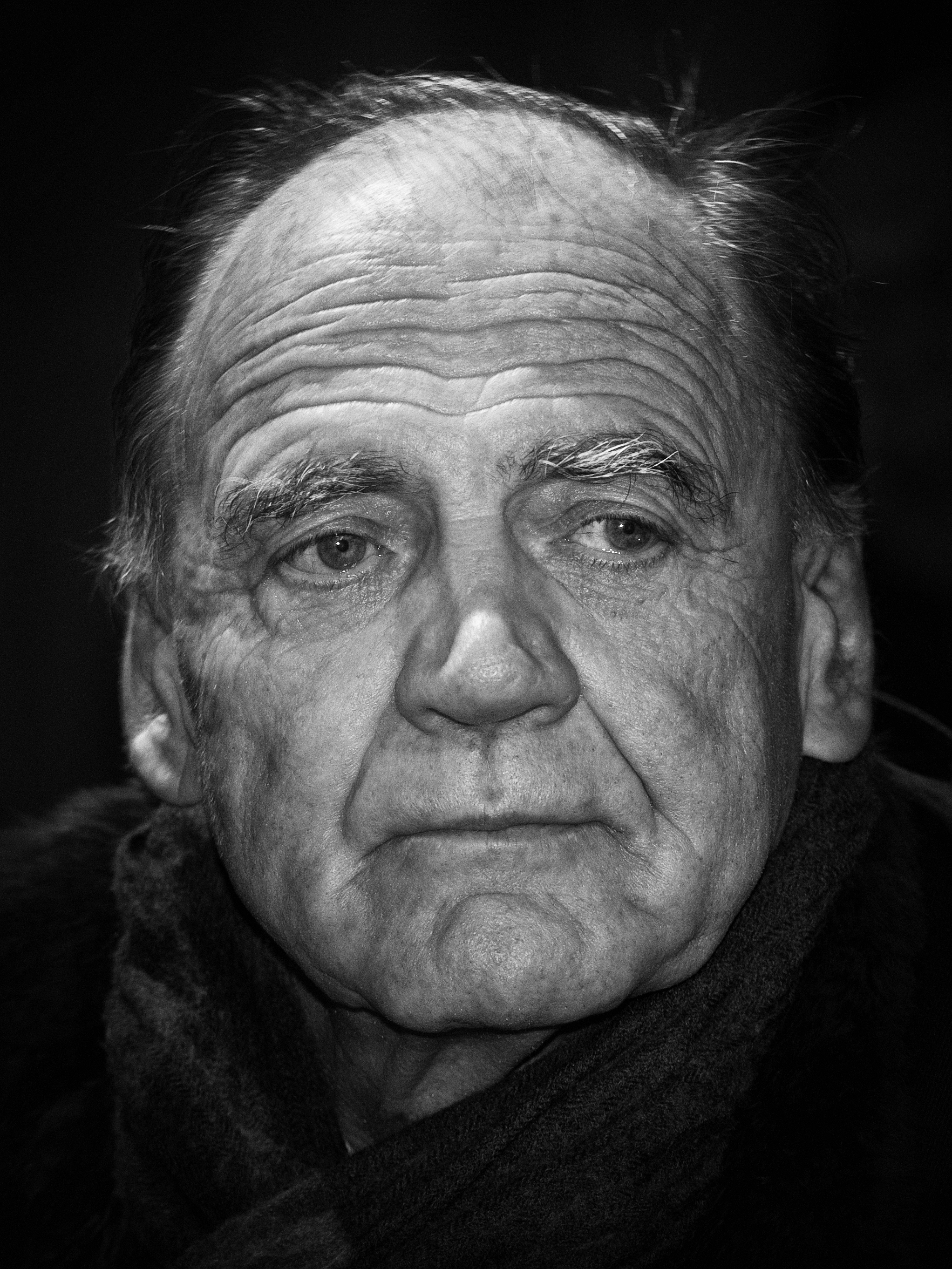
Bruno Ganz

- 1 January – Pio Corradi, photographer (born 1940)
- 3 January – Jean Revillard, photojournalist (born 1967)
- 4 January – Daniel Lüönd, musician (born 1959).
- 5 January – Beat Junker, historian (born 1928)
- 10 January – Daniel Müller, politician (born 1928)
- 18 January – Bernhard Böschenstein, literary scholar (born 1931)
- 29 January – Otto Schubiger, ice hockey player (born 1925)
- 15 February – Bruno Ganz, actor (Wings of Desire, Downfall, The Manchurian Candidate) (born 1941)
- 20 February – Claude Goretta, television producer and film director (born 1929)
- 14 March – Kurt Armbruster, footballer (born 1934)
- 18 April – Ivo Frosio, footballer (born 1930)
- 20 April – Karl Grob, footballer (born 1946)
- 7 June – Max Bösiger, boxer (born 1933)
- 1 August – Annemarie Huber-Hotz, politician (born 1948)
- 15 September – Eva Haldimann, literary critic and translator (born 1927)
- 2 November – Marie Laforêt, singer and actress (born 1939)
