= 2015 in Switzerland =

- Decades: 1990s; 2000s; 2010s; 2020s
- See also: History of Switzerland; Timeline of Swiss history; List of years in Switzerland

The following lists events that happened during 2015 in Switzerland.

== Incumbents ==
- Federal Council:
  - Doris Leuthard
  - Eveline Widmer-Schlumpf
  - Ueli Maurer
  - Didier Burkhalter
  - Johann Schneider-Ammann
  - Simonetta Sommaruga (President)
  - Alain Berset

== Events ==
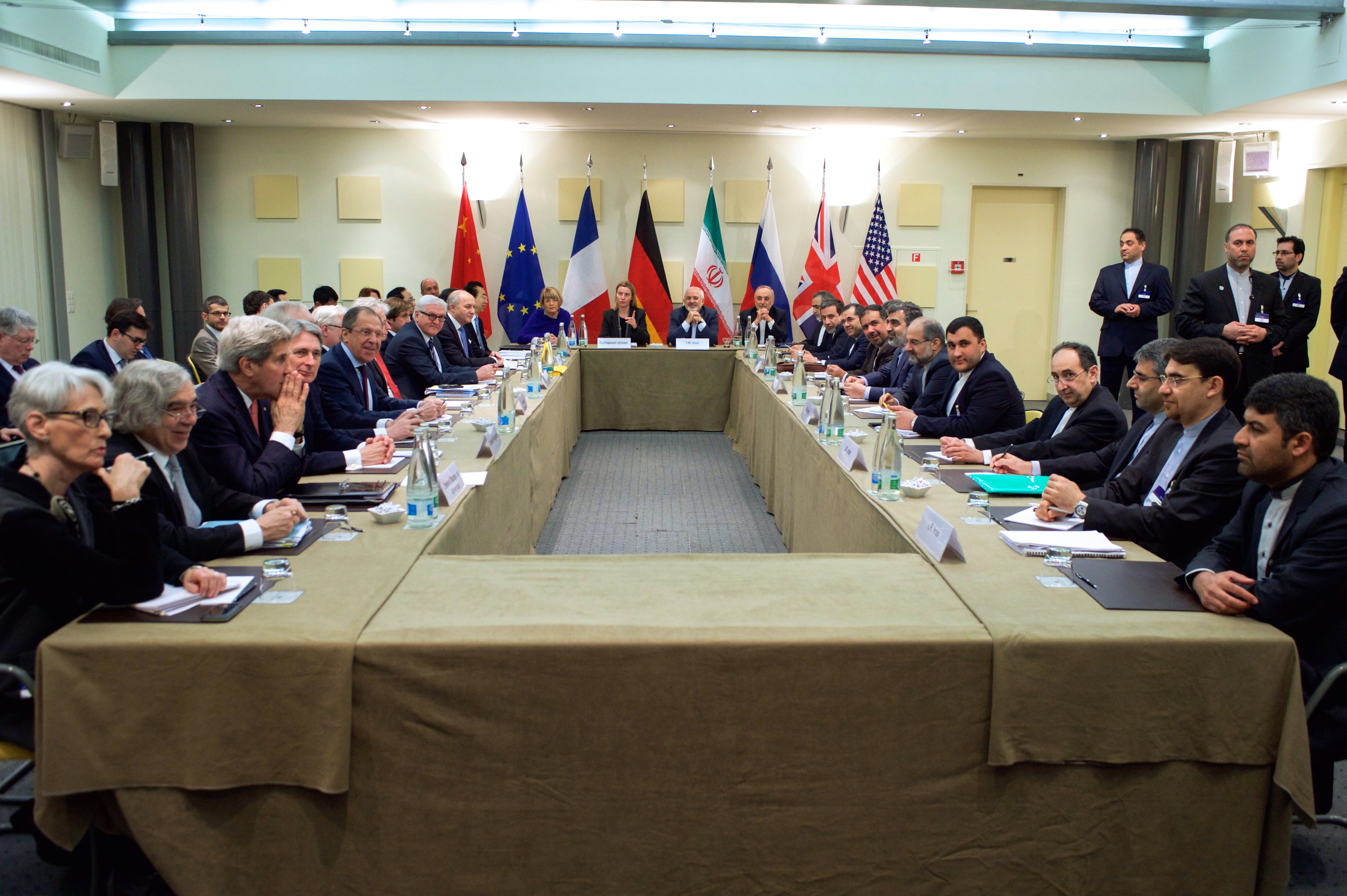
The ministers of foreign affairs of the United States, the United Kingdom, Russia, Germany, France, China, the European Union and Iran negotiating in Lausanne for a Comprehensive agreement on the Iranian nuclear programme (30 March 2015).

- 12–19 September – The 2015 World Mixed Curling Championship takes place in Bern.
- 18 October – 2015 Swiss federal election held for the National Council and the first round of elections to the Council of States.

== Deaths ==
- 21 January – Frieda Dänzer, alpine skier (born 1930)
- 9 February – Nadia Röthlisberger, curler (born 1972)
- 14 December – Herbert Kiesel, bobsledder (born 1931)
