= 2008 in Switzerland =

- Decades: 1980s; 1990s; 2000s; 2010s; 2020s
- See also: History of Switzerland; Timeline of Swiss history; List of years in Switzerland

Events during the year 2008 in Switzerland.

== Incumbents ==
- Federal Council:
  - Pascal Couchepin (president)
  - Moritz Leuenberger
  - Samuel Schmid (until December), then Ueli Maurer
  - Micheline Calmy-Rey
  - Hans-Rudolf Merz
  - Doris Leuthard
  - Eveline Widmer-Schlumpf

== Events ==
- 27 August – Anna Göldi, who was beheaded in 1782 for witchcraft, is exonerated by the parliament of the Canton of Glarus.
- 10 September – The Large Hadron Collider, the most powerful particle accelerator in the world, is switched on at CERN, in Geneva.

== Deaths ==
- 29 April – Albert Hofmann, chemist (born 1906)
- 23 July – Kurt Furgler, politician (born 1924)
