= Julien-François Zbinden =

Swiss composer and pianist (1917–2021)

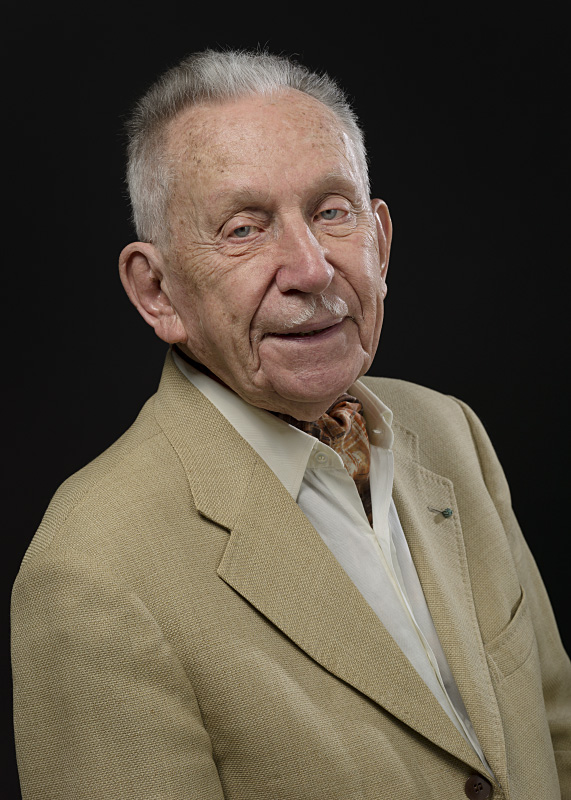
Julien-François Zbinden

Julien-François Zbinden (11 November 1917 – 8 March 2021) was a Swiss composer and jazz pianist.

== Life ==
Born in Rolle, Kanton Waadt, Zbinden studied piano in Lausanne and Geneva. He learned musical composition mainly autodidactically, but also took lessons with René Gerber. In 1938 he became pianist of a jazz band. From 1947 he worked at Radio Suisse Romande in Lausanne, first as a recording manager and from 1956 as head of the music department. From 1973 to 1979 and from 1987 to 1991 Zbinden was president of the Swiss Society for the Rights of Authors of Musical Works (SUISA).

Zbinden is the winner of numerous prizes: the Henryk Wieniawski Composition Prize in Warsaw (1956), the Grand Prize of the Communauté radiophonique des programmes de langue française, the Swiss Radio Broadcasting Prize, the prize of the Société des auteurs et compositeurs dramatiques (SACD) and the prize of the Association des amis du Festival international de Lausanne. In 1978, he was appointed to the rank of Officer in the Officier des Arts et des Lettres. and in 1993 he received the Gold Medal of the City of Lausanne. He was an honorary member of the association Les Amis de Maurice Ravel. He lived in Lausanne.

Zbinden's catalogue of works comprises more than 100 compositions, including stage works, 5 symphonies (the No. 5, his Op. 100, was premiered in 2007), concertante works, chamber and vocal music for various instrumentations. In his overall tonal language, influences of Jazz, Neoclassicism and Arthur Honegger can be discerned.

Zbinden played the piano every day and was still performing in public as late as 2017, the same year he celebrated his centenary.

He died in March 2021 at the age of 103.

== Discography ==
- Jazz solo trio sextette (1952–1979, with different line-ups)
- It's the Talk of the Town (with Antoine Ogay and Marcel Papaux, 2007)
- Orchestral works [Symphonies 1-4, Torneo veneto op. 64, Prosphora op. 61, Elégie op. 76] (2007) (double CD on Gallo label, various artists)
- Last Call…? (2010)
