= 1930 Swiss alcohol referendum =

Referendum in Switzerland

6 April 1930
- Federal decree regarding the revision of Articles 31 and 32bis of the Federal Constitution (alcohol trade)

Results
Choice	Votes	%
Yes	494,248	60.58%
No	321,641	39.42%
Valid votes	815,889	98.58%
Invalid or blank votes	11,747	1.42%
Total votes	827,636	100.00%
Registered voters/turnout	1,093,191	75.71%

A referendum on alcohol was held in Switzerland on 6 April 1930. Voters were asked whether they approved of amending articles 31 and 32 bis and adding article 32 quarter, which concerned alcohol. The proposal was approved by a majority of voters and cantons.

== Background ==
The referendum was a mandatory referendum, which required a double majority; a majority of the popular vote and majority of the cantons. The decision of each canton was based on the vote in that canton. Full cantons counted as one vote, whilst half cantons counted as half.

== Results ==
Choice	Popular vote		Cantons		
Choice	Votes	%	Full	Half	Total
For	494,248	60.6	16	2	17
Against	321,641	39.4	3	4	5
Blank votes	9,980	–	–	–	–
Invalid votes	1,767	–	–	–	–
Total	827,636	100	19	6	22
Registered voters/turnout	1,093,191	75.7	–	–	–
Source: Nohlen & Stöver
