= Henri Lauener =

Swiss philosopher

Henri Lauener (13 July 1933 in Bern - 28 October 2002, Bern) was a Swiss philosopher interested in both transcendental and analytic currents. He has been the editor of the journal Dialectica. A Lauener Foundation for Analytical Philosophy has been developed, which awards a biennial prize to outstanding life works in this field.

== Works ==
- Die Sprache in der Philosophie Hegels. Mit besonderer Berücksichtigung der Ästhetik . Haupt, Bern 1962
- Hume und Kant. Systematische Gegenüberstellung einiger Hauptpunkte ihrer Lehren. Francke, Bern 1969
- Willard Van Orman Quine. C.H. Beck (BsR 503), München 1982, ISBN 3-406-08503-2
- Offene Transzendentalphilosophie. Kovac (Boethiana 50), Hamburg 2002, ISBN 3-8300-0550-4
- Handlungskontext. Regelkonforme Verwendung und Bedeutung (mit Benito Müller). Academia Richarz (Academia Philosophical Studies 14), Sankt Augustin 1998, ISBN 3-89665-092-0
