= Paul Emil Usteri =

Swiss politician

Paul Konrad Emil Usteri (12 August 1853 – 1 February 1927) was a Swiss politician and President of the Swiss Council of States (1909/1910).

Preceded by Adrien Thélin	President of the Council of States; 1909/1910	Succeeded by Josef Winiger
