= 2018 in Switzerland =

- Decades: 1990s; 2000s; 2010s; 2020s
- See also: History of Switzerland; Timeline of Swiss history; List of years in Switzerland

Events in the year 2018 in Switzerland.

== Incumbents ==
- President of the Swiss Confederation: Alain Berset
- President of the National Council: Dominique de Buman
- President of the Swiss Council of States: Karin Keller-Sutter

== Events ==
- 23 September – The Canton of St Gallen become the second canton in Switzerland to vote in favor of a ban on facial coverings in public with two-thirds casting a ballot in favor.

=== Sports ===
- 9 to 25 February – Switzerland participated at the 2018 Winter Olympics in PyeongChang, South Korea, with 166 competitors in 14 sports
- 9 to 18 March – Switzerland participated at the 2018 Winter Paralympics in PyeongChang, South Korea

== Deaths ==
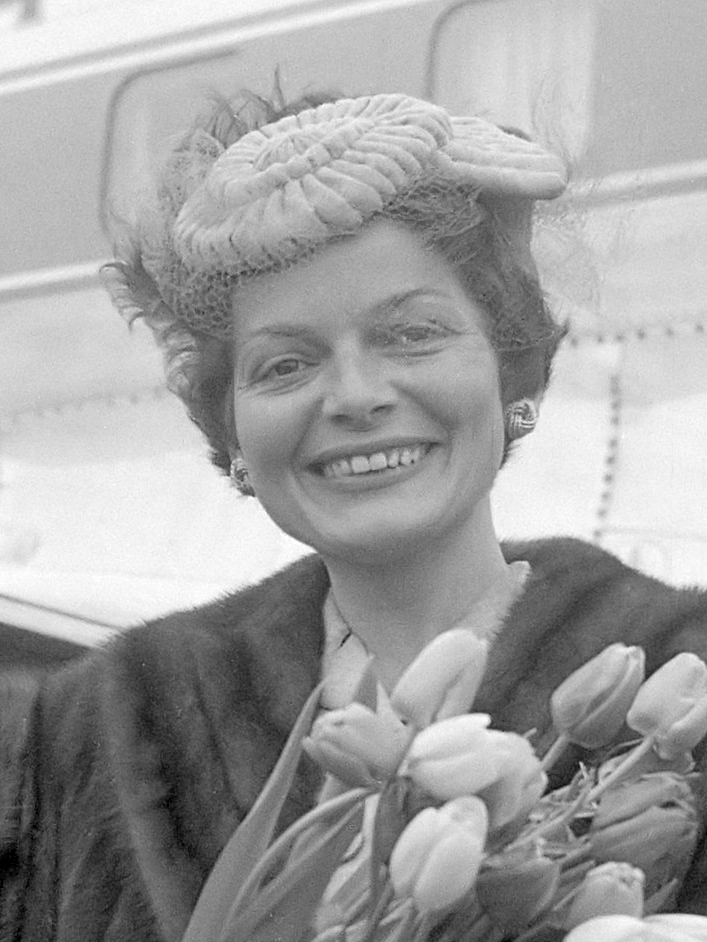
Lys Assia in 1957

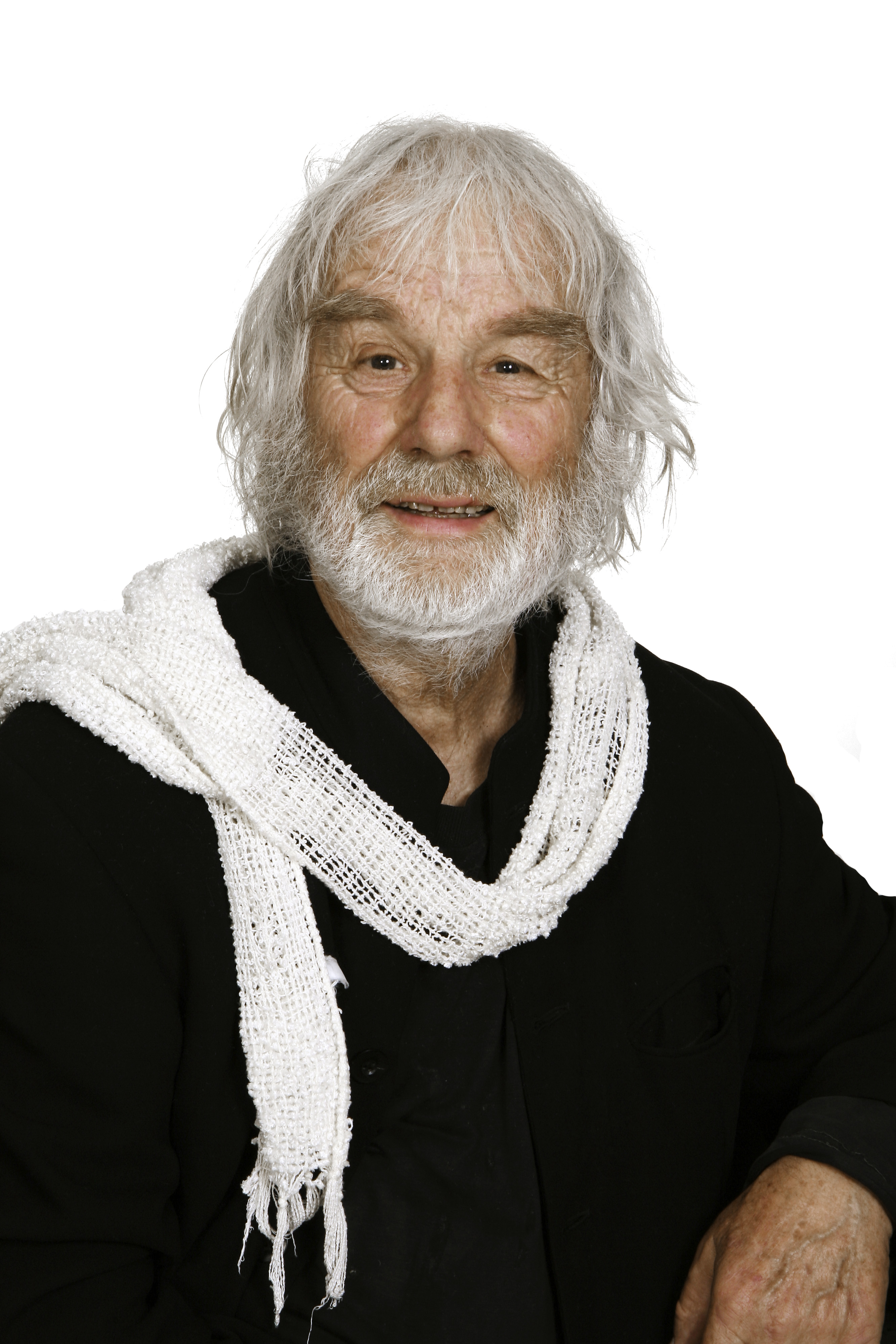
Ernst Sieber

- 9 January – Kurt Thalmann, footballer (b. 1931)
- 10 January – Urs Fankhauser, rower (b. 1943)
- 16 January – Wilhelm Melliger, equestrian (b. 1953)
- 1 March – Luigi Taveri, motorcycle road racer (b. 1929)
- 19 March – Jürg Laederach, writer (b. 1945)
- 24 March – Lys Assia, singer (b. 1924)
- 4 May – Alexander Tschäppät, politician (b. 1952)
- 19 May – Ernst Sieber, pastor (b. 1927)
- 6 July – Gilbert Facchinetti, entrepreneur and football executive, President of Neuchâtel Xamax (b. 1936).
