= Jean Revillard =

Swiss photojournalist (1967–2019)

- Born: 22 September 1967; Geneva, Switzerland
- Died: 3 January 2019 (aged 51); Huelgoat, France
- Occupation: Photojournalist

Jean Revillard (22 September 1967 – 3 January 2019) was a Swiss photojournalist and winner of two World Press Photo awards in 2008 and 2009.

== Biography ==
Revillard attended the School of Business and Engineering Vaud with Luc Chessex, Jesus Moreno, and Christian Caujolle. After graduating, he became a journalist for Le Nouveau Quotidien and L'Hebdo.

In 2001, he founded Rezo.ch, which was the first online photography agency in French-speaking Switzerland.

In 2010, he became a photographer for Bertrand Piccard's Solar Impulse Project.

Jean Revillard died of a heart attack while filming in Huelgoat, Brittany on 4 January 2019.

Revillard won his 2008 World Press Photo award for his work on Calais migrant shacks. He won another World Press Photo award in 2009, along with a prize from the City of Prague.

His archives were donated to the Library of Geneva
