= 1931 Swiss referendums =

Five referendums were held in Switzerland during 1931. The first was held on 8 February on a federal resolution on a petition for a referendum on article 12 of the constitution concerning bans on religious orders, and was approved by a majority of voters and cantons. The second and third were held on 15 March on revising article 72 of the constitution concerning the election of the National Council and on revising article 76, 96 and 105 on the legislative term. Both were approved. The fourth and fifth were held on 6 December on a federal law on aged and bereavement insurance and a federal law on tobacco taxation. Both were rejected.

== Background ==
The February and March referendums were "obligatory", requiring a double majority; a majority of the popular vote and majority of the cantons. The decision of each canton was based on the vote in that canton. Full cantons counted as one vote, whilst half cantons counted as half. The December referendums were "optional", and required only a majority of the public vote.

== Results ==
=== February: Petition for a referendum on article 12 ===
Choice	Popular vote		Cantons		
Choice	Votes	%	Full	Half	Total
For	293,845	70.2	14	6	17
Against	124,804	29.8	5	0	5
Blank votes	39,649	–	–	–	–
Invalid votes	2,142	–	–	–	–
Total	460,440	100	19	6	22
Registered voters/turnout	1,100,670	41.8	–	–	–
Source: Nohlen & Stöver

=== March: Election of the National Council ===
Choice	Popular vote		Cantons		
Choice	Votes	%	Full	Half	Total
For	296,053	53.9	11	5	13.5
Against	253,382	46.1	8	1	8.5
Blank votes	38,517	–	–	–	–
Invalid votes	2,490	–	–	–	–
Total	590,442	100	19	6	22
Registered voters/turnout	1,104,113	53.5	–	–	–
Source: Nohlen & Stöver

=== March: Legislative terms ===
Choice	Popular vote		Cantons		
Choice	Votes	%	Full	Half	Total
For	297,938	53.7	14	4	16
Against	256,919	46.3	5	2	6
Blank votes	33,477	–	–	–	–
Invalid votes	2,108	–	–	–	–
Total	590,442	100	19	6	22
Registered voters/turnout	1,104,113	53.5	–	–	–
Source: Nohlen & Stöver

=== December: Aged and bereavement insurance ===
Choice	Votes	%
For	338,032	39.7
Against	513,512	60.3
Blank votes	24,846	–
Invalid votes	2,673	–
Total	879,063	100
Registered voters/turnout	1,124,881	78.1
Source: Nohlen & Stöver

=== December: Tobacco tax ===
Choice	Votes	%
For	423,523	49.9
Against	425,449	50.1
Blank votes	27,498	–
Invalid votes	2,593	–
Total	879,063	100
Registered voters/turnout	1,124,881	78.1
Source: Nohlen & Stöver
