= Jakob Herzog =

Swiss socialist politician

Jakob Herzog (1892 – 1931) was a Swiss Socialist. Originally a member of the Social Democratic Party of Switzerland, Herzog was expelled from the party in 1918 for 'indiscipline', after seeking to extend a strike at the Zurich bank. Herzog became one of the founding members of the Swiss Communist Movement (Forderung) in 1918.
