= Maximag =

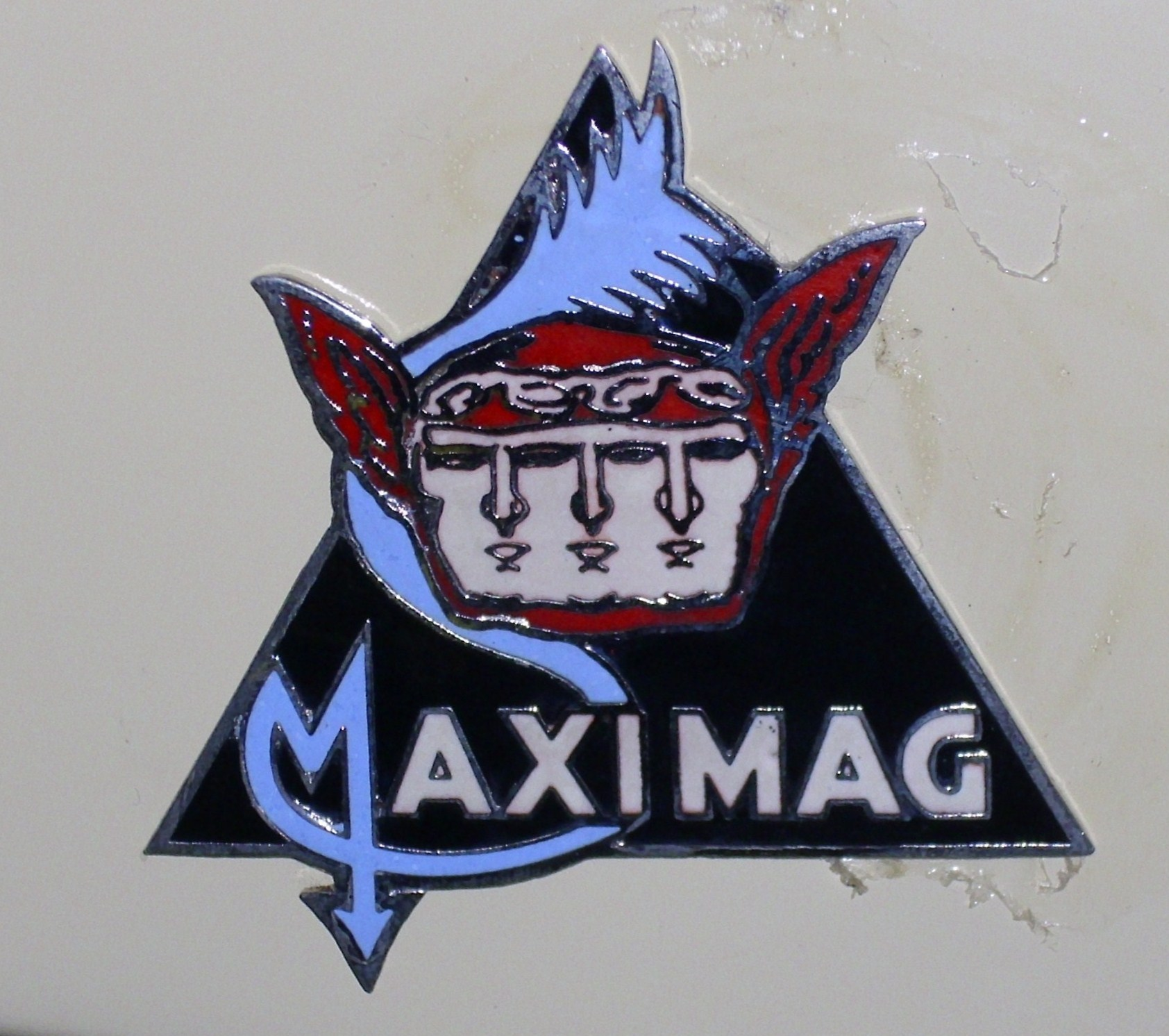
- Industry: Manufacturing
- Founded: 1923 (as an automobile manufacturer)
- Defunct: 1928
- Headquarters: Carouge, Geneva, Switzerland; Lyon, France
- Products: Automobiles

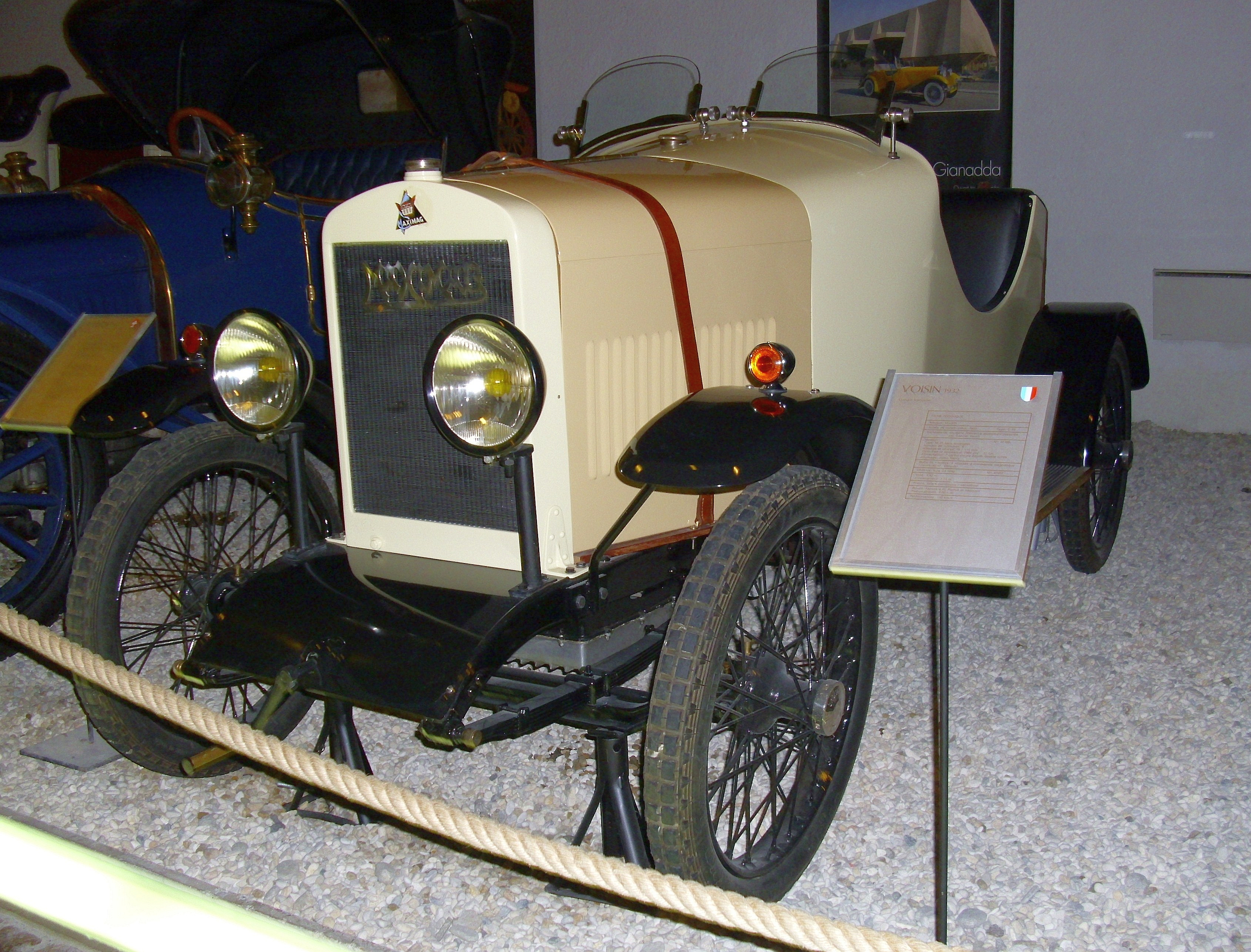

Maximag was the name of a Swiss automobile, produced by Motosacoche, based at Carouge, a suburb of Geneva, from 1923 till 1928.

By the time it embarked on automobile manufacturing, the company had already established itself as a maker of engines and motor cycles.

From 1924 the cars were also assembled in Lyon which enabled them to be sold in France without being penalized by the tariff barriers that separated the national markets of the two countries in question.

== Cars ==
The manufacturer took at stand at the 19th Paris Motor Show in October 1924 and exhibited a sporty "voiturette" style car powered by a 4-cylinder 1095cc side-valve engine with a cylinder bore of 59 mm (2.3 in), which placed it in the 7HP tax band. The car sat on a 2,400 mm (94.5 in) wheelbase and was priced by Maximag at 14,850 francs when fitted with a small 2-seater "torpedo" body.

The same car was on display two years later at the 20th Paris Motor Show in October 1926. Engine displacement and wheelbase were unchanged but now, in addition to the sportily styled "torpedo" body, the car was available with what was listed as a 2-door "conduite intérieure" body. ("Conduite intérieure" was a slightly old-fashioned and upmarket designation, inherited from the horse-drawn carriage business, for what in this context was a small conventionally boxy saloon/sedan.)
