= Dominique Appia =

Swiss painter

Dominique Appia (29 July 1926 – 8 January 2017) was a Swiss painter based in Geneva. His paintings depict imaginative scenarios of cities, landscapes and interiors where familiar elements are juxtaposed as in a dream: a cathedral becomes a railway station, the Mediterranean gushes up from the Paris Metro, and a room with disappearing children is invaded by different world environments. "Entre les trous de la memoire", in English "Between the Holes in the Memory", is the best known image by this intriguing and little-known artist.

His dreamlike paintings are often mistaken for the work of Salvador Dalí.
