= 1928 Swiss referendums =

Two referendums held in Switzerland in 1928

Two referendums were held in Switzerland during 1928. The first was held on 20 May, asking voters whether they approved of amending article 44 of the constitution regarding measures against foreign infiltrators, and was approved by a majority of voters and cantons. The second was held on 2 December, asking voters whether they approved of the "Kursaalspiele" popular initiative on gambling, and was also approved.

== Background ==
The constitutional question was a mandatory referendum, which required a double majority; a majority of the popular vote and majority of the cantons. The decision of each canton was based on the vote in that canton. Full cantons counted as one vote, whilst half cantons counted as half. The gambling question was a "popular initiative", which also required a double majority.

== Results ==
=== Constitutional amendment ===
Choice	Popular vote		Cantons		
Choice	Votes	%	Full	Half	Total
For	316,250	70.7	17	5	19.5
Against	131,215	29.3	2	1	2.5
Blank votes	26,688	–	–	–	–
Invalid votes	1,238	–	–	–	–
Total	475,391	100	19	6	22
Registered voters/turnout	1,050,683	45.2	–	–	–
Source: Nohlen & Stöver

=== Gambling initiative ===
Choice	Popular vote		Cantons		
Choice	Votes	%	Full	Half	Total
For	296,395	51.9	13	3	14.5
Against	274,528	48.1	6	3	7.5
Blank votes	20,248	–	–	–	–
Invalid votes	1,678	–	–	–	–
Total	592,849	100	19	6	22
Registered voters/turnout	1,067,754	55.5	–	–	–
Source: Nohlen & Stöver
