= 2016 Zurich Islamic center shooting =

2016 mosque shooting in Switzerland

Zürich Islamic center shooting
- Zürich (Canton of Zurich) Zürich (Switzerland)
- Location: 47.3779°N 8.5319°E; Zürich Islamic Center, Zürich, Switzerland
- Date: 19 December 2016; 5:30 p.m. (UTC+1)
- Attack type: Shooting, stabbing
- Weapons: Pistol; Knife
- Deaths: 2 (including the perpetrator, and the man stabbed the day prior)
- Injuries: 3
- Perpetrator: Manuel O.
- Motive: Unknown

On 19 December 2016 in the Zürich Islamic Center in central Zürich, three people were injured when a gunman opened fire in the center, though all survived. The perpetrator, who had stabbed a former friend to death the day prior to the shooting, died by suicide after fleeing the scene.

The assailant was identified as Manuel O., a 24-year-old Swiss man of Ghanaian descent living in Uster who was known to have an interest in the occult. The Islamic Central Council of Switzerland claimed the attacker was motivated by anti-Muslim sentiment, though this was questioned by the gunman's family.

== Schwamendingen stabbing ==
At approximately 9 a.m. on 18 December 2016, a man was found stabbed to death on a playground in the Schwamendingen district of Zürich. The dead man had been stabbed repeatedly. The victim was a 24-year-old Swiss national of Chilean descent. The police identified a suspect in the murder the next morning based on DNA evidence at the scene, and began searching for the assailant. The suspect's DNA was in a police database due to a prior arrest, and he was known to be a former friend of the murder victim.

The perpetrator then went home. The police, after tracing his DNA, went to his apartment to arrest him the morning of the shooting, but he was gone. The police visited his mother's home. The perpetrator called his mother after they visited, and thanked her for everything she had done for him. Using the phone call they were able to trace the phone he used, and search nearby CCTVs for an image of him.

== Shooting ==
At approximately 5:30 p.m. on 19 December 2016, a man entered the Zürich Islamic Center (German: Islamische Zentrum Zürich) near the Zürich Hauptbahnhof, in District 4, and began shooting indiscriminately. The center, which is primarily used by refugees from Somalia and Eritrea, was hosting prayer services at the time. Four men were present in the prayer room where the shooting took place. Three people were wounded in the attack, two seriously, though all survived. The victims were two Somali nationals, aged 30 and 35, and an ethnically Somali Swiss citizen aged 56. One witness reported hearing the shooter yell "Raus aus unserem Land", 'Get out of our country'", though this could not be confirmed by police. The police were called at 5:31 p.m. The other worshipers barricaded themselves in an adjoining room until police arrived.

After the shooting, the suspect fled the area on foot and a police manhunt was started to capture him. Police brought in dog tracking teams to attempt to locate the suspect, and alerted the public to be wary. The gunman died of a self-inflicted gunshot. His body was found a few hours after the shooting under the Gessner bridge on the river Sihl, 300 meters from the Islamic center. Initially it was unclear if he was connected to the shooting. The victims were given emergency surgery and were afterwards described as stable.

== Perpetrator ==
The man responsible for the murder and subsequent shooting was identified as Manuel O., a 24-year-old Swiss citizen of Ghanaian descent living in Uster. He was the son of a Swiss mother and a Ghanaian father. As his mother did not want to marry his father and his father's application for asylum in Switzerland was rejected, his father returned to Ghana, never having met his son. He had difficulties in school growing up, and had below-average grades. The perpetrator's mother and neighbor said that the gunman complained about Salafists, though he had defended Muslims as a whole as misunderstood. Another neighbor alternatively described him as an ardent Christian who spoke negatively about Islam. The perpetrator lived alone and had quit his job at a local store the Friday prior to the shooting. He had known the stabbing victim for many years and had formerly been close friends with him, but they had a falling out shortly before the murder.

Evidence in his apartment and statements from his family indicated he had had a substantial interest in occult practices and Satanism since his youth, but the motivation for both the stabbing death and subsequent shooting was unclear. He was interested in conspiracy theories and the end of the world, and had a room in his apartment dedicated to occult rituals, which he would not let anyone, even his mother, enter. The perpetrator was also a prepper: he bought survival rations and legally acquired a pistol. He avoided social media because he feared being surveilled and gave away his television, not wanting it to influence him. After the annexation of Crimea in 2014, he became afraid of the outbreak of World War III, and urged his family to stock up on emergency supplies. Relatives noticed his condition became worse in the summer of 2016: he lost his job, didn't pay the bills, would not answer calls, and seemed to retreat into himself.

The gunman had no known connection to the Islamic center that he targeted or any of the victims there. Police indicated that there was no evidence that the suspect was connected to either Islamist or right-wing extremists, and that it was unclear if he was mentally ill. Other than an arrest for stealing a bicycle seven years before the shooting and juvenile charges for assault, the perpetrator had no criminal record. The gun used in the shooting was legally registered to the assailant.

== Reaction ==
As the shooting at the Islamic center occurred on the same day as the assassination of Andrei Karlov and the 2016 Berlin truck attack, there was initially fear that the events might be related. American President-elect Donald Trump called all three events "terror attacks" and said that "the civilized world must change thinking". The mother of the perpetrator theorized that the shooting may have been related to an episode of mental illness, and apologized for the actions of her son.

The Islamic Central Council of Switzerland, a fundamentalist Muslim organization which is under surveillance by Swiss intelligence agencies, issued a statement condemning the attack and suggesting it should serve as an "alarm" regarding the threat posed by increasing Islamophobia in Swiss society. They encouraged mosques and Islamic institutions to be vigilant against the threat of violence and called on federal and cantonal authorities to guarantee the security of Switzerland's Muslim minority. They also directed criticism at the anti-Islamic attitudes expressed by politicians from the right-wing Swiss People's Party (SVP). Immediately after the crime, police increased their presence in front of mosques, and a spokesman for security department assured the Somali community that the city would pay special attention to their security. The local community of Somali Muslims received support from the Protestant Church of Switzerland.

The injured victims criticized the lack of information supplied to them about the shooting and the lack of information released by the judiciary. According to the lawyer of one of the victims, he had not been able to inspect the dossier of information related to the shooter. All of the victims had to undergo multiple surgeries, and one of the victims was unable to attend the mosque regularly after the shooting due to trauma. The case was closed on 27 September 2017, common in cases where the perpetrator dies by suicide. According to the prosecutor's office, the gunman had personal problems, and had no accomplices.
