= Marcel Roethlisberger =

Swiss art historian (1929–2020)

Marcel Roethlisberger or Röthlisberger (1929 – 1 March 2020) was a Swiss art historian and professor from the University of Geneva.

Roethlisberger completed his doctoral thesis on Jacopo Bellini in 1955. He married the art historian Biancamaria Bianco in 1962 and was visiting professor to many universities and held positions at various art institutions such as the Courtauld Institute, the National Gallery of Art (in D.C.), and the J. Paul Getty Museum.

Roethlisberger died on 1 March 2020.

== Selected publications ==
- Claude Lorrain: The Paintings. 2 vols. New Haven, CT: Yale University Press, 1961;
- Claude Lorrain: the Drawings. 2 vols. Berkeley: University of California Press, 1968;
- European Drawings from the Kitto Bible: an Exhibition at the Henry E. Huntington Library and Art Gallery. San Marino, CA: Henry E. Huntington Library and Art Gallery, 1969;
- Bartholomäus Breenbergh: Handzeichnungen. Berlin: de Gruyter, 1969;
- Cavalier Pietro Tempesta and his Time. Newark, DE: University of Delaware Press, 1970;
- The Claude Lorrain Album in the Norton Simon Inc. Museum of Art. Los Angeles: Los Angeles County Museum of Art, 1971;
- Deuchler, Florens, and Luethy, Hans. Schweizer Malerei. Geneva: Skira, 1975,
- English, Swiss Painting: from the Middle Ages to the Dawn of the Twentieth Century. New York: Rizzoli, 1976;
- "Breenbergh and Laurens Barata", Los Angeles County Museum of Art Bulletin 23, 1977
- Loche, Renée. L'opera completa di Liotard. Milan; Rizzoli, 1978;
- Bartholomeus Breenbergh: the Paintings. New York: de Gruyter, 1981;
- Im Licht von Claude Lorrain: Landschaftsmalerei aus drei Jahrhunderten: Haus der Kunst München. Munich: Hirmer Verlag, 1983;
- Abraham Bloemaert and his Sons: Paintings and Prints. 2 vols. Doornspijk: Davaco, 1993;
- Loche, Renée. Liotard. 2 vols. Doornspijk: Davaco, 2008.
