= Charles Ribordy =

Swiss fencer (1929–2000)

Personal information
- Born: 24 October 1929 Sion, Switzerland
- Died: 10 August 2000 (aged 70)

Sport
- Sport: Fencing

Charles Ribordy (24 October 1929 – 10 August 2000) was a Swiss fencer. He competed in the team épée event at the 1960 Summer Olympics.
