= Felix Calonder =

Swiss politician (1863–1952)

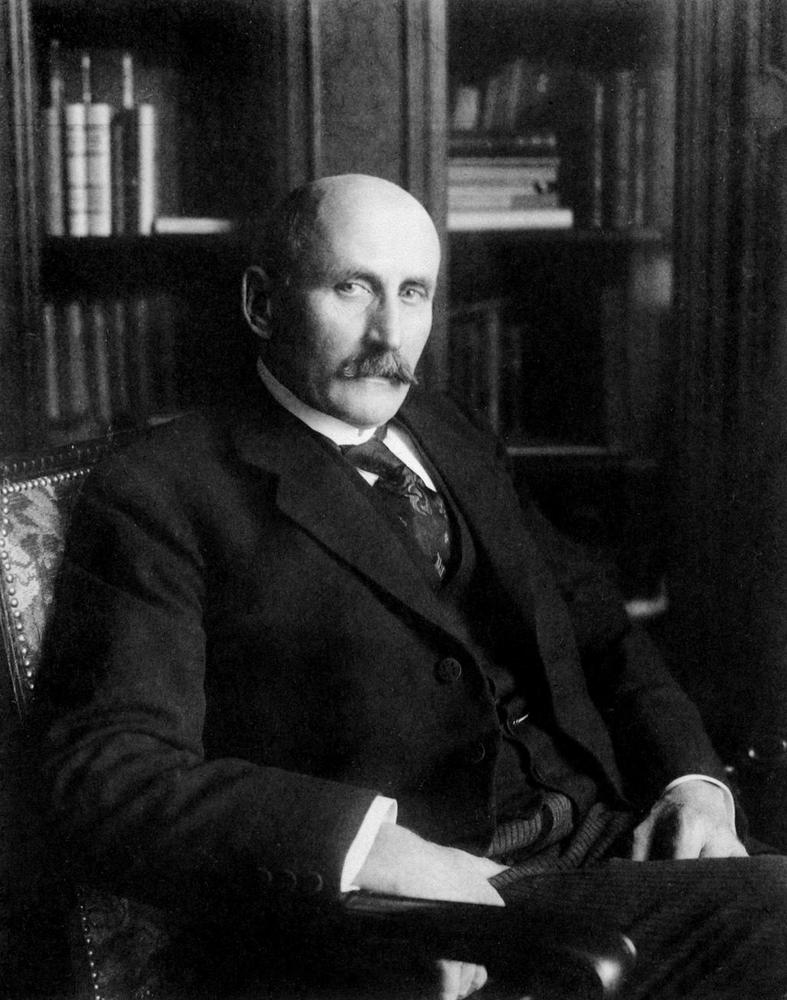
- Calonder c. 1918

President of Switzerland
- In office 1 January 1918 – 31 December 1918
- Preceded by: Edmund Schulthess
- Succeeded by: Gustave Ador

Swiss Federal Councillor
- In office 12 June 1913 – 12 February 1920
- Department: Home Affairs (1913–1917); Political (1918–1919)
- Preceded by: Louis Perrier
- Succeeded by: Heinrich Häberlin

Personal details
- Born: Felix Louis Calonder; 7 December 1863 Scuol, Grisons, Switzerland
- Died: 14 June 1952 (aged 88) Zurich, Canton of Zurich, Switzerland
- Party: Free Democratic Party

Felix Louis Calonder (7 December 1863 – 14 June 1952) was a Swiss politician who was President of the Swiss Confederation in 1918 and a member of the Swiss Federal Council from 1913 to 1920. He was affiliated to the Free Democratic Party. During his tenure of office, he held the Department of Home Affairs from 1913 to 1917, and the Political Department from 1918 to 1919. As of 2025, Felix Calonder has been the Federal Council's only native Romansh speaker.

== Early life (1863–1891) ==
Calonder was born in Scuol in the Engadin valley, the son of a master builder from Trin. When Calonder was six years old, his family moved to Trin, where he went to elementary school. From 1878 to 1881 Calonder visited the cantonal school in Chur. He dropped out, worked as a commercial trainée for three years, and did not graduate with a matura until 1885 in Zürich. He studied law in Zürich, Munich, Paris, and Bern, where he submitted his doctoral thesis on international law in 1889. He was active in the student corporation "Zofingia", and became a militia officer and judge in the Swiss Armed Forces.

After completing his studies, Calonder returned to Chur, where he worked as a court secretary, and later established his own partnership in a lawyer's office. In 1892, he married Ursulina Walther, with whom he had three children.

== Legislative offices (1891–1913) ==
In 1891, Calonder was elected to the Grisons' cantonal legislative (cussegl grond) where he represented the Free Democrats, and kept his mandate until 1913. He unsuccessfully ran for a seat in the cantonal executive (regenza) in 1893. By the late 1890s, he had gained a reputation in transport policy; his struggle for an eastern alpine railway and his lobbying for federal subsidies to the Rhätische Bahn's narrow-gauge system helped him win his party one of the Grisons' two seats in the Swiss Council of States in 1899. During his tenure in the Council of States, he was given the mandate to negotiate an agreement with the Grand Duchy of Baden regarding the usage of the Rhine for ship transport and hydropower. He presided the Council of States for the 1911/1912 term.

== Federal council (1913–1920) ==
When Federal Councillor Adolf Deucher died in 1912, Calonder was one of the candidates for the vacant seat in the Swiss Federal Council. On 17 July 1912 he lost the election to Edmund Schulthess in the first vote, partially due to Schulthess's strong support by Catholic Conservatives, farmers' organizations, and the industrial lobby. Disappointed by the result, Grison politicians and media called for a boycott of the Swiss National Day (1 August) in 1912.

The following year, in May 1913, Federal councillor Louis Perrier died, and Calonder's candidacy looked more promising. The Catholic Conservatives now supported him. A few federal politicians were worried about Calonder's bias in promoting the Grisons' interests in the alpine railway, and Calonder's election would make the Romandie lose one of its two councillors it had been providing since 1881. Nevertheless, Calonder won the election in the first round with 151 out of 199 valid votes, and without any noteworthy opposition (Arthur Couchepin received the second-best result with 11 votes). Calonder assumed office in the Swiss Federal Council on 21 June 1913.

For the first four years, Calonder held the Department of Home Affairs. One of the first bills he had to represent before the Federal Assembly concerned the federal decision on creating the only Swiss National Park.

In 1918, Calonder was elected President of the Swiss Confederation and, as was customary for that office at the time, also took over the "Political Department" (foreign relations). In his function as president, he was faced with increased expression of social grievances by the working class and poor, and started meeting with the "Oltener Aktionskomitee" (OAK) in August 1918. The OAK was a committee of Swiss labor unions and Social democrats, formed to demand and enforce socio-political reforms, and led by Robert Grimm. When the authorities used military force to discontinue the extension of an originally peaceful protest strike in Zürich on 10 November, the committee gave Calonder the ultimatum to either call back the militia or accept the consequences of a nationwide strike, Calonder declined in the name of the Federal Council, and on 11 November 1918 the committee called for an indefinite strike, now referred to as the Swiss general strike. Around 400,000 workers went on strike, militia regiments were ordered to counter them, and the railway system was militarized. Three demonstrators were killed by soldiers in Grenchen, and there were violent clashes in Zürich and Biel as well. The OAK recognized the strike's futility, and called for its ending, Calonder informed the Federal Assembly with the words "The nightmare has gone away. Free and proud, Swiss democracy stands with its head raised high." Calonder was criticized for his actions during the Landesstreik. He had already been mocked by Grimm for "nearly breaking out in tears during negotiations, instead of firmly standing his ground", and the Federal Assembly and media saw his reactions to the strike as ambiguous: On the one hand, Calonder held a speech on 12 November, when he promised the Social Democrats a seat in the Federal Council. On the other hand, put under pressure by the army command and centre-right parliamentarians, he signed the Federal Council's ultimatum addressed to the OAK one day later. He never regained the left's support, and after his demission in 1920, the Social Democratic newspaper Volksrecht characterized him as "a rather limited reactionary".

In his final year in the Federal Council, Calonder was a proponent of Woodrow Wilson's idea for a League of Nations, and appointed historians and legal experts to study questions of international law in the aftermath of World War I. Instead of "absolute" neutrality, he suggested a "differential" neutrality, which could include carrying out economic sanctions proposed by the League of Nations. With the support of fellow councillors Giuseppe Motta and Gustave Ador, Calonder finally succeeded in passing the bill to join the League of Nations against strong opposition by politicians from German speaking rural and conservative cantons, but also against the majority of Social Democrats. He gained less support for his actions regarding the "Vorarlberg question" - on 11 May 1919 80% of the Vorarlberger had voted that their state should join Switzerland, and Calonder advocated these plans as well. He met fierce opposition within the Federal Council, namely by Schulthess and Motta, and was eventually forced to abandon his advancements in this direction.

His actions during the nationwide strike, his advancement of membership in the League of Nations, and his weak position in the Vorarlberg question resulted in a meager count of votes for Calonder's reconfirmation by the Federal Assembly in December 1919. He asked for sick leave five days later, and announced his resignation on 21 January 1920. The Federal Assembly officially approved his request on 12 February 1920 and elected Heinrich Häberlin as his successor.

== Later years (1920–1952) ==
After his demission, Calonder was appointed by the League of Nations to mediate in the Åland crisis in 1920. In 1921 he led the Geneva conference for regulating conditions in Upper Silesia in connection with the Silesian Uprisings. From 1922 to 1937, he lived in Katowice where, as president of the mixed German-Polish commission, he supervised the execution of the conference's outcome. In 1937, he moved to Zürich and worked as a legal consultant. Felix Louis Calonder died on 14 June 1952 in Zürich.

Political offices
Preceded by Josef Winiger	President of the Swiss Council of States; 1911/1912	Succeeded by Gottfried Kunz
Preceded by Louis Perrier	Member of the Swiss Federal Council; 1913–1920	Succeeded by Heinrich Häberlin
