= Marcel Pilet-Golaz =

Swiss politician (1889-1958)

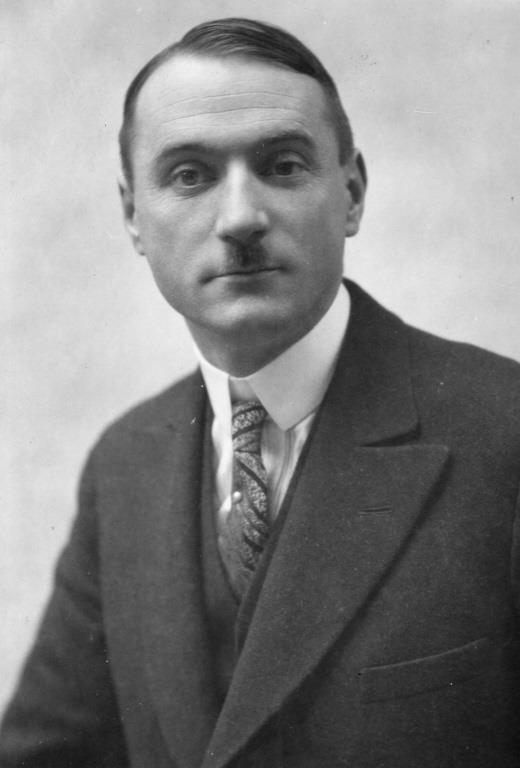
- Pilet-Golaz in 1929

Member of the Swiss Federal Council
- In office 13 December 1928 – 31 December 1944
- Preceded by: Ernest Chuard
- Succeeded by: Max Petitpierre

President of Switzerland
- In office 1 January 1934 – 31 December 1934
- Preceded by: Edmund Schulthess
- Succeeded by: Rudolf Minger
- In office 1 January 1940 – 31 December 1940
- Preceded by: Philipp Etter
- Succeeded by: Ernst Wetter

Personal details
- Born: 31 December 1889; Cossonay, Vaud, Switzerland
- Died: 11 April 1958 (aged 68); Paris, France
- Political party: Free Democratic Party

Marcel Pilet-Golaz (31 December 1889 – 11 April 1958) was a Swiss politician. He was elected to the Swiss Federal Council on 13 December 1928 and handed over office on 31 December 1944. He was affiliated to the Free Democratic Party.

During his time in office he held the following departments:

- Department of Home Affairs (1929)
- Department of Posts and Railways (1930–1939)
- Political Department (1940)
- Department of Posts and Railways (1940)
- Political Department (1941–1944)

He was President of the Confederation twice in 1934 and 1940.

Pilet-Golaz was said to be a pragmatic politician who tried to negotiate with German nazism and Italian fascism. He, therefore, had to face the reproach that he sympathized with fascism.

As the head of the foreign affairs, he had to find a balance between the German requirements, the objections of the Allies and the will of Switzerland to stay independent. His choice to build a relatively good rapport with Nazi Germany was very disputed, during as well as after the war. On 25 June 1940, Pilet-Golaz gave a speech containing numerous references to the coming of an authoritarian regime in Switzerland and to a "new order" in Europe. In September, he met with three representatives of the National Movement of Switzerland (Nationale Bewegung der Schweiz/Mouvement national suisse), the Swiss pro-Nazi party (the MNS was disbanded by the Federal government two months later).

In 1944, when Pilet-Golaz tried to take up relations with the Soviet Union, the latter refused roughly. So he lost all support and had to resign.

== Notes and references ==
- Werner Rings, Die Schweiz im Krieg.

Political offices
Preceded by Ernest Chuard	Member of the Swiss Federal Council; 1928–1944	Succeeded by Max Petitpierre
