= Karl Scheurer =

Swiss politician (1872–1929)

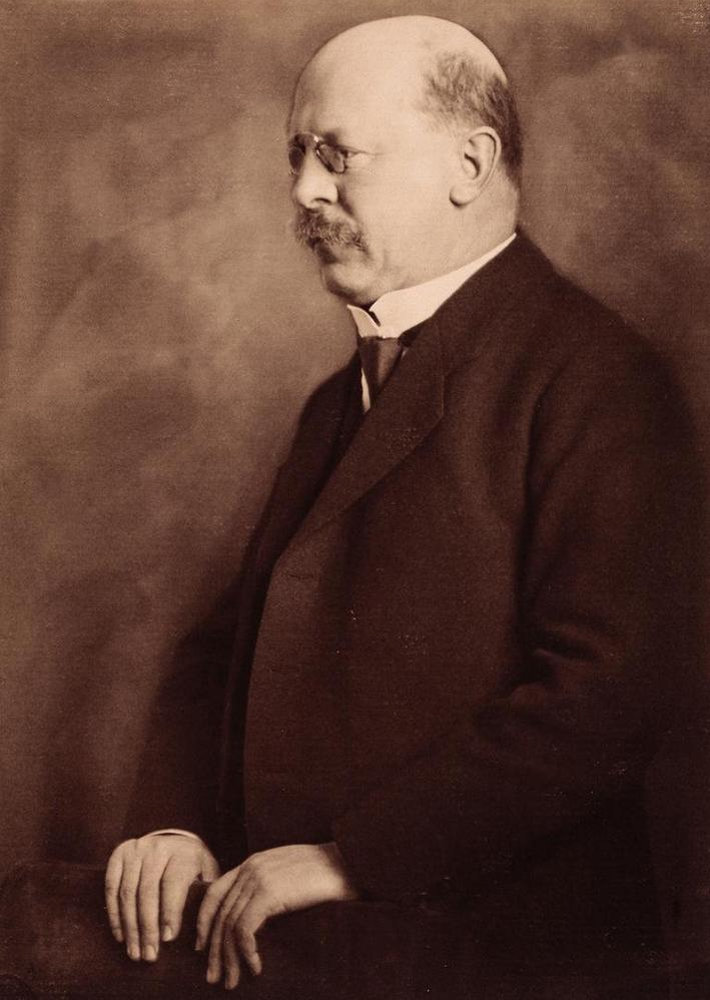

President of Switzerland
- In office 1 January 1923 – 31 December 1923
- Preceded by: Robert Haab
- Succeeded by: Ernest Chuard

Swiss Federal Councillor
- In office 11 December 1919 – 14 November 1929
- Preceded by: Eduard Müller
- Succeeded by: Rudolf Minger

Personal details
- Born: 27 September 1872 Sumiswald, Canton of Bern, Switzerland
- Died: 14 November 1929 (aged 57)
- Party: Free Democratic Party

Karl Scheurer (27 September 1872 – 14 November 1929) was a Swiss politician.

He was elected to the Swiss Federal Council on 11 December 1919 and died in office on 14 November 1929. He was affiliated with the Free Democratic Party of Switzerland.

During his time in office he held the Military Department (department of defence) and was President of the Confederation in 1923.

Preceded by Eduard Müller	Member of the Swiss Federal Council; 1919–1929	Succeeded by Rudolf Minger
