= Ernest Chuard =

Swiss politician (1857–1942)

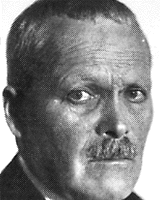

President of Switzerland
- In office 1 January 1924 – 31 December 1924
- Preceded by: Karl Scheurer
- Succeeded by: Jean-Marie Musy

Swiss Federal Councillor
- In office 11 December 1919 – 31 December 1928
- Department: Home Affairs
- Preceded by: Camille Decoppet
- Succeeded by: Marcel Pilet-Golaz

Personal details
- Born: 31 July 1857 Corcelles-près-Payerne, Vaud, Switzerland
- Died: 9 November 1942 (aged 85)
- Party: Free Democratic Party

Ernest Chuard (31 July 1857 – 9 November 1942) was a Swiss politician who was Federal Councillor from 1919 to 1928.

He was elected to the Swiss Federal Council on 11 December 1919 and handed over office on 31 December 1928. He was affiliated with the Free Democratic Party.

During his office time he held the Federal Department of Home Affairs and he was President of the Confederation in 1924.

Preceded by Camille Decoppet	Member of the Swiss Federal Council; 1919–1928	Succeeded by Marcel Pilet-Golaz
