= Rudolf Minger =

Swiss politician

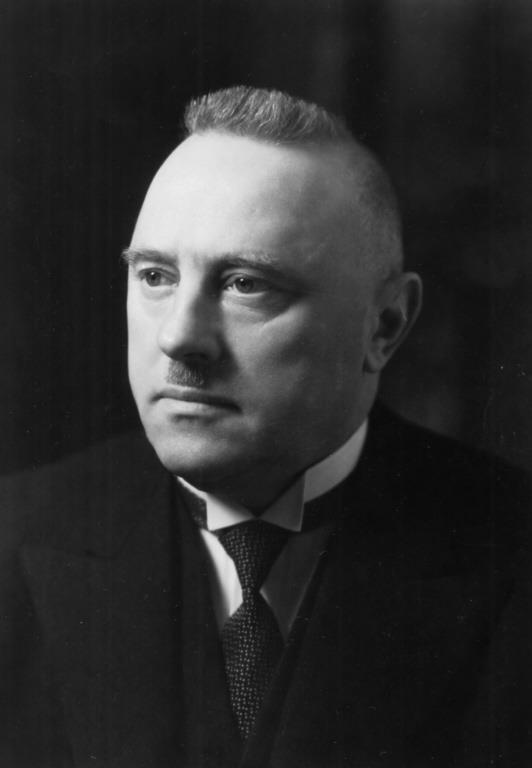
Rudolf Minger

Rudolf Minger (13 November 1881 – 23 August 1955) was a Swiss politician and member of the Swiss Federal Council (1929–1940). He also was a farmer all his life.

He was elected to the Federal Council on 12 December 1929 and handed over office on 31 December 1940. He was the first councillor from the Party of Farmers, Traders and Independents (BGB/PAI), now the Swiss People's Party.

During his time in office, he held the Military Department and was President of the Confederation in 1935.

| Preceded by Paul Maillefer | President of the National Council; 1927/1928 | Succeeded by Heinrich Walther |
| Preceded by Karl Scheurer | Member of the Swiss Federal Council; 1930–1940 | Succeeded by Eduard von Steiger |
