= Robert Haab =

Swiss politician (1865–1939)

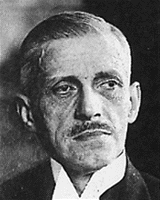

President of Switzerland
- In office 1 January 1929 – 31 December 1929
- Preceded by: Edmund Schulthess
- Succeeded by: Jean-Marie Musy
- In office 1 January 1922 – 31 December 1922
- Preceded by: Edmund Schulthess
- Succeeded by: Karl Scheurer

Swiss Federal Councillor
- In office 13 December 1917 – 31 December 1929
- Department: Posts and Railways
- Preceded by: Ludwig Forrer
- Succeeded by: Albert Meyer

Personal details
- Born: 8 August 1865
- Died: 15 August 1939 (aged 74)
- Party: Free Democratic Party

Robert Haab (8 August 1865 – 15 October 1939) was a Swiss politician.

He was elected to the Swiss Federal Council on 13 December 1917 and handed over office on 31 December 1929. He was affiliated to the Free Democratic Party. He studied law at the universities of Leipzig, Strasbourg and Zurich.

During his office time he held the Department of Posts and Railways and was President of the Confederation in 1922, winning by a slim majority of 163 to 154, and again in 1929.

== Citations ==
Preceded by Ludwig Forrer	Member of the Swiss Federal Council; 1917–1929	Succeeded by Albert Meyer
