= Jean-Marie Musy =

Swiss politician (1876–1952)

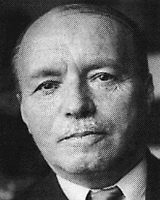

President of Switzerland
- In office 1 January 1930 – 31 December 1930
- Preceded by: Robert Haab
- Succeeded by: Heinrich Häberlin
- In office 1 January 1925 – 31 December 1925
- Preceded by: Ernest Chuard
- Succeeded by: Heinrich Häberlin

Swiss Federal Councillor
- In office 11 December 1919 – 30 April 1934
- Department: Finance
- Preceded by: Gustave Ador
- Succeeded by: Philipp Etter

Personal details
- Born: 10 April 1876 Albeuve, Canton of Fribourg, Switzerland
- Died: 19 April 1952 (aged 76) Fribourg, Canton of Fribourg, Switzerland
- Party: Catholic-Conservative Party
- Children: Benoît, Pierre

Jean-Marie Musy (10 April 1876 – 19 April 1952) was a Swiss politician. Affiliated with the Christian Democratic People's Party of Switzerland, he was elected to the Federal Council of Switzerland on 11 December 1919 and served until 30 April 1934. He was President of the Confederation twice, in 1925 and 1930.

During his time in office he held the Department of Finance.

Musy, a fascist with pro-Axis sympathies, was acquainted with Heinrich Himmler. Toward the end of World War II, the forces of Nazi Germany were retreating and near defeat. At the request of two Swiss Orthodox Jews, Recha Sternbuch and her husband Yitzchak Sternbuch, and in coordination with them, Musy and his son Benoît Musy engaged in high-level negotiations with Himmler and Walter Schellenberg to rescue large numbers of Jews in the concentration camps. Following the Himmler–Musy Agreement of 12 January 1945, Musy was involved in the release of 1,210 prisoners from the Theresienstadt concentration camp in February 1945. The group was saved after $1.25 million was placed in Swiss banks by Jewish organizations working in Switzerland. However, the money was never paid to the Nazis.

Jean-Marie Musy's son Pierre received numerous equestrian competition titles and won the four-man bobsleigh gold medal at the 1936 Winter Olympics in Garmisch-Partenkirchen, Germany. Benoît Musy, who accompanied his father on most of the trips to Germany, won numerous awards as a race car and motorcycle driver.

== In literature, film and television ==
- Jacques Allaman: La Liste de Musy. Éditions de l’Aire, Vevey 2022, ISBN 978-2889562756.

Political offices
Preceded by Gustave Ador	Member of the Swiss Federal Council; 1919–1934	Succeeded by Philipp Etter
