= Heinrich Häberlin =

Swiss politician and judge (1868–1947)

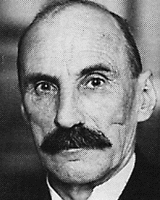

President of Switzerland
- In office 1 January 1931 – 31 December 1931
- Preceded by: Jean-Marie Musy
- Succeeded by: Giuseppe Motta
- In office 1 January 1926 – 31 December 1926
- Preceded by: Jean-Marie Musy
- Succeeded by: Giuseppe Motta

Swiss Federal Councillor
- In office 12 February 1920 – 12 March 1934
- Department: Justice and Police
- Preceded by: Felix Calonder
- Succeeded by: Johannes Baumann

Personal details
- Born: 6 September 1868 Weinfelden, Thurgau, Switzerland
- Died: 26 February 1947 (aged 78) Frauenfeld, Thurgau, Switzerland
- Party: Free Democratic Party

Heinrich Häberlin (6 September 1868 – 26 February 1947) was a Swiss politician, judge and member of the Swiss Federal Council (1920–1934).

From 1904 he was a member of the Swiss Council of States, from 1905 member of the Grand Council of Thurgau. For four years he presided over the FDP in the Swiss Federal Assembly. On 12 February 1920, he was elected to the Federal Council and was in charge of the Justice and Police Department from which he resigned on 30 April 1934. Twice, in 1926 and 1931, he was elected President of the Federal Council, making him the highest ranking representative of the Swiss Confederation.

== Biography ==
=== Family background, education ===
Heinrich Häberlin was born 1868 in Weinfelden as the son of Friedrich Heinrich Häberlin (1834–1897).

The Häberlin family was influential on many levels in Swiss politics over the years and for this reason was occasionally referred to as the Dynastengeschlecht der Häberlinge (Family Dynasty of Häberlin).

His uncle Eduard Häberlin (1820–1884) was president of the Council of States.

=== Professional life ===
Upon graduation from Kantonsschule Frauenfeld in 1887, he began law studies at the University of Zürich and continued his studies at the University of Leipzig and at the Humboldt University in Berlin. While in Leipzig which was the German stronghold for jurisprudence, he formed a friendship with Prinz Ferdinand von Hohenzollern-Sigmaringen, who was later crowned King Ferdinand I of Romania. Though their ways parted, they met again years later when Ferdinand was on an official state visit in Switzerland. Häberlin received his lawyer's license in 1891 and completed a short internship in Lausanne at the lawyer's office of Federal Councillor Louis Ruchonnet. In 1892 he opened his own law firm in Weinfelden, which two years later he moved to the canton capital of Frauenfeld. He quickly gained a reputation for being an outstanding lawyer and became the most sought after in this area of Switzerland. From 1899 to 1920 he presided over the District Court Frauenfeld. Häberlin got actively involved in politics, which was a common practice among judges and lawyers at that time. And in 1904 he was elected into the Swiss Federal Council of which he was president in 1918–1919. In addition to his political activities at the national level, Häberlin was also active in local politics in the Canton of Thurgau. In 1905 he was elected to the Grand Council of the Canton of Thurgau, where he served for 15 years. Twice he was appointed President of the Grand Council (1909/10 and 1915/16). Following the resignation of Felix Calonder as Federal Councillor, Häberlin was elected in the first ballot with 124 out of 159 votes as successor on 12 February 1920.

While in office he was in charge of the Justice and Police Department. During his time in the Federal Council, he was President of the Swiss Confederation in 1926 and 1931.

Häberlin was to a large extent instrumental in the unification of criminal law. Characteristic of his tenure were particularly two rejected laws by the people for the expansion of state security laws, which became known as Lex Häberlin I and II. The purpose of these proposed laws was to protect the civil and democratic state against extremist influences. And in the wake of the rise of Nazism in Germany, he strongly condemned fascist and Nazi totalitarianism based on his democratic-liberal attitude and was warning of the danger of Hitler's martial aspirations as early as 1932. Moreover, he was highly regarded for his expertise in his chosen field, the sharpness and preciseness of his dialectic skills, wit and humour.

As the President of the Board of Trustees of Pro Juventute, he described the Yenish people as "a dark spot in our proud Swiss culture" in a brochure published in 1927, advocating for their elimination. Dispensaries, teachers, pastors, and non-profit organizations provided support to the foundation. While the legislation provided certain boundaries, these limits were often disregarded, leading to open illegality. With the collapse of the Austro-Hungarian Empire, Emperor Charles I and his wife Zita von Bourbon-Parma went into exile in Switzerland. Charles gave his word of honor to the Swiss authorities to give notification in case of any intentions of travelling abroad, however, he broke it twice and went to Hungary in a futile attempt to restore the monarchy and to regain power over his lost empire. After that, based on Häberlin's initiative, the whole family and entourage were no longer granted asylum in Switzerland due to their violation of Swiss asylum law and were asked to leave. Nevertheless, when one of the children of Empress Zita came down with appendectomy and needed to undergo surgery in Zürich, Häberlin granted them visa extensions for the time being.

=== Retirement ===
Even after his retirement he was still much sought after in important matters. He became a board member of one of the biggest Swiss insurance companies Winterthur, and also first president of Pro Helvetia, and was friends and acquaintance with such diverse personalities as the famous German writer Hermann Hesse, and Walter Mittelholzer who was not only a pioneer of Swiss aviation but also one of the first aviation entrepreneurs. Others included the Nobel prize winner for literature Romain Rolland, the Swiss painters Cuno Amiet who is considered a pioneer of modern art in Switzerland and Carl Liner among others.

Häberlin died 1947 in Frauenfeld.

== Anecdotes ==
Häberlin's most famous and interesting client at the time when he practiced law in Weinfelden was certainly the airship inventor Count Ferdinand von Zeppelin (1838–1917). In Häberlin's diaries an entry can be found from 16 September 1934 in which he writes that Count Zeppelin was among other things his client in manners such as border disputes with the eminent psychiatrist Ludwig Binswanger (1881–1966) who was running an exclusive psychiatric clinic nearby, the Sanatorium Bellevue. When Häberlin and the Count were discussing business matters in the lounge of the Count's family estate Schloss Girsberg, it was not rare that they heard the propeller noise of Count Zeppelin's airship passing by. In moments like these, Count Zeppelin's attention was drawn away from matters at hand and Häberlin suggested, "Excellency, shall we take a break until the airship has passed?", upon which Count Zeppelin stood up, went to the window with a smile, saying, "Yes, you are right, Sir."

In the rare moments of leisurely life, Häberlin found a lot of comfort in mountaineering and one day he took his wife to the beautiful Alpine village of Zermatt and when he was introducing her to the different peaks surrounding it, an American tourist standing nearby overheard his explanations and assumed Häberlin to be a local mountain guide. The American approached and asked politely if it was possible to have him – the President of the Federal Council of Switzerland – as a mountain guide. In his usual manner of being low-key, the president politely explained to the American that he was on a holiday with his wife to show her the natural wonders of the Swiss Alps and thus wasn't the "mountain guide" the gentlemen had mistaken him to be.

During World War I, Häberlin was a regiment commander and was stationed with his troops in the Swiss Alps. In those days it was strongly prohibited for the soldier in charge of guarding horse carriages to ride on top of the carriage, instead the soldier had the duty to run behind the carriage in case anything fell off during the transportation. Needless to say, the soldier on duty was not too thrilled with this task, especially when the carriage was empty after delivering the goods and still he was not allowed to ride on it. So one day a guard of Häberlin's regiment sat next to the coachman on the horse carriage on their way back after dropping off their goods at the designated area. They were on a mountainous road which had many turns, when all of a sudden Häberlin appeared out of nowhere and harshly questioned the guard why he was sitting on the coach instead of running alongside it. The flabbergasted soldier answered in all honesty, "Because Colonel, Sir, I noticed you too late!", upon hearing this, Häberlin started to laugh heartily and let the soldier off due to the guard's honesty.

Preceded by Henri Calame	President of the National Council; 1918/1919	Succeeded by Eduard Blumer
Preceded by Felix Calonder	Member of the Swiss Federal Council; 1920–1934	Succeeded by Johannes Baumann
