= Edmund Schulthess =

Swiss politician (1868-1944)

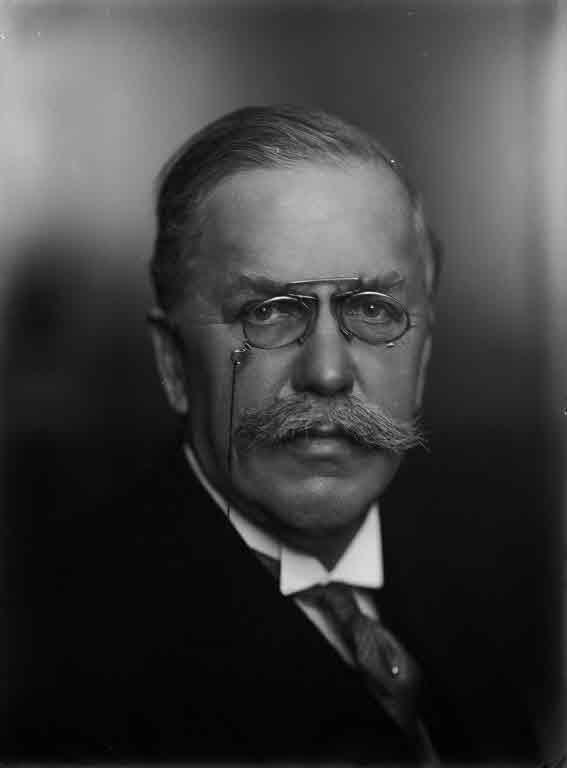
- Schulthess c. 1935

President of Switzerland
- In office 1 January 1933 – 31 December 1933
- Preceded by: Giuseppe Motta
- Succeeded by: Marcel Pilet-Golaz
- In office 1 January 1928 – 31 December 1928
- Preceded by: Giuseppe Motta
- Succeeded by: Robert Haab
- In office 1 January 1921 – 31 December 1921
- Preceded by: Giuseppe Motta
- Succeeded by: Robert Haab
- In office 1 January 1917 – 31 December 1917
- Preceded by: Camille Decoppet
- Succeeded by: Felix Calonder

Swiss Federal Councillor
- In office 17 July 1912 – 15 April 1935
- Department: Economic Affairs
- Preceded by: Adolf Deucher
- Succeeded by: Hermann Obrecht

Personal details
- Born: 2 March 1868 Villnachern, Aargau, Switzerland
- Died: 22 April 1944 (aged 76) Bern, Canton of Bern, Switzerland
- Party: Free Democratic Party
- Spouse: Marguerite Jeanne Disqué (m. 1892)
- Children: 1

Edmund Schulthess (2 March 1868 – 22 April 1944) was a Swiss attorney and politician who served on the Federal Council (Switzerland) from 1912 to 1935. Schulthess also concurrently served as President of the Swiss Confederation four times in 1917, 1921, 1928 and 1933.

== Early life and education ==
Schulthess was born 2 March 1868 in Villnachern, Switzerland, the youngest of four children, to Edmund Schulthess (1826–1906), a farmer and estate owner, and German-born Brigitta Cornelia Schulthess (née Marth; 1828–1896), into an affluent Protestant family. Among his siblings was Wilhelm Schulthess.

His paternal ancestors, which included noted educator and philanthropist Anna Pestalozzi-Schulthess as well as Barbara Schulthess, where socially prominent in Zurich in the 18th century and belonged to the bourgeoisie. Notably they were active in the silk industry and later operated a confectionary at Rüdenplatz. His mother was originally from Hanau in the Province of Hesse-Nassau.

In 1888, Schulthess passed his school-leaving examinations at Old Cantonal School Aarau and subsequently studied law at the universities of Strasbourg, Munich, Leipzig, Bern, and Paris.

== Political career ==
He was elected to the Swiss Federal Council on 17 July 1912 and handed over office on 15 April 1935. He was affiliated to the Free Democratic Party. During his time in office he held the following departments:

- Department of Trade, Industry and Agriculture (1912–1914)
- Department of Economic Affairs (1915–1935)

He was President of the Swiss Confederation four times, in 1917, 1921, 1928 and 1933.

== Personal life ==
In 1892, Schulthess married French-born Marguerite Jeanne Disqué (1870–1960), originally from Saint-Quentin, Aisne in Picardy, at the Church of the Holy Trinity in Berne. They had one daughter:

- Nelly Marguerite Jeanne Schulthess (1903–1999), married to Portuguese-born Vasco de Quevedo Pessanha (born 1909), of Portuguese nobility. His father was the Ambassador of Portugal to Switzerland in Berne. They had four children.

He died on 22 April 1944 in Bern.

Preceded by Adolf Deucher	Member of the Swiss Federal Council; 1912–1935	Succeeded by Hermann Obrecht
