= Giuseppe Motta =

Swiss politician (1871–1940)

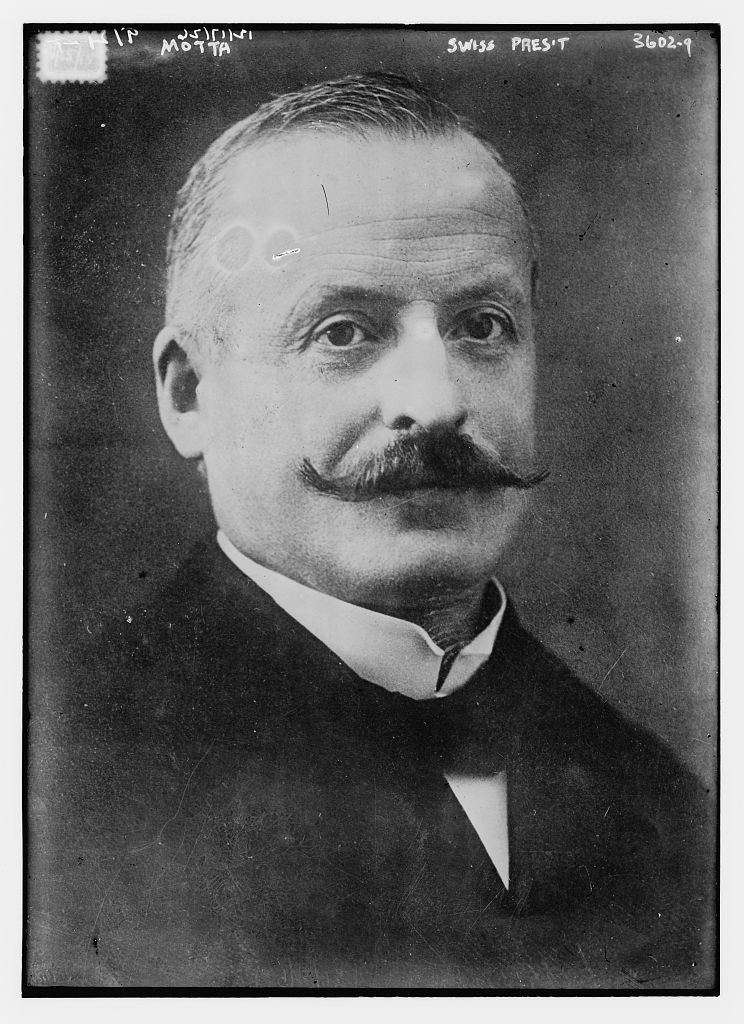
- Motta circa 1915

President of Switzerland
- In office 1 January 1937 – 31 December 1937
- Preceded by: Albert Meyer
- Succeeded by: Johannes Baumann
- In office 1 January 1932 – 31 December 1932
- Preceded by: Heinrich Häberlin
- Succeeded by: Edmund Schulthess
- In office 1 January 1927 – 31 December 1927
- Preceded by: Heinrich Häberlin
- Succeeded by: Edmund Schulthess
- In office 1 January 1920 – 31 December 1920
- Preceded by: Gustave Ador
- Succeeded by: Edmund Schulthess
- In office 1 January 1915 – 31 December 1915
- Preceded by: Arthur Hoffmann
- Succeeded by: Camille Decoppet

Swiss Federal Councillor
- In office 14 December 1911 – 23 January 1940
- Preceded by: Josef Anton Schobinger
- Succeeded by: Enrico Celio

President of the League of Nations
- In office 1924–1925
- Preceded by: Cosme de la Torriente
- Succeeded by: Raoul Dandurand

Personal details
- Born: 29 December 1871 Airolo, Ticino, Switzerland
- Died: 23 January 1940 (aged 68) Bern, Switzerland
- Party: Catholic Conservative Party

Giuseppe Motta (29 December 1871 – 23 January 1940) was a Swiss politician. He served as President of the Swiss Confederation 5 times. He was a member of the Swiss Federal Council (1911–1940) and President of the Assembly of the League of Nations (1924–1925). He was a Catholic-conservative foreign minister and a staunch opponent of communism and Stalinism.

== Biography ==
He was born on 29 December 1871. He was elected to the Federal Council of Switzerland on 14 December 1911. Motta served 28 years in the Federal Council, the third-longest tenure to date. He was affiliated with the Catholic Conservative Party of Switzerland.

While in office he headed the Department of Finance (1912–1919) and the Political Department (1920–1940). He was elected President of the Confederation five times, in 1915, 1920, 1927, 1932 and 1937.

In 1923 the ICRC admitted the first two non-Genevans to its Assembly - Max Huber from Zürich and Motta, who was also the first Catholic. He clearly did not see any conflict of interest in combining his work with the ICRC with his continuing political career.

Motta was involved with the Federal Council Felix Calonder in Switzerland's accession to the League of Nations on 16 May 1920. In 1924, he became President League of Nations Assembly. At his suggestion, Switzerland was one of the few states against accepting the Soviet Union into the League of Nations. He was one of the most outspoken advocates of admission of Germany. In the Interwar Period, he pleaded for a partial departure from the Swiss neutrality principle, but spoke out from 1938 in the face of the looming Second World War again for its strict observance.

He died in office on 23 January 1940, at 68 years old.

== Commemoration ==
Among others, via Giuseppe Motta in Lugano, Chiasso, Minusio, Mendrisio, and Massagno, Piazza Giuseppe Motta in Ascona and Avenue Giuseppe-Motta in Geneva are named for him.

His portrait was painted twice in the late 1930s by the Swiss-born American artist Adolfo Müller-Ury. The first, a large three-quarter portrait, dated 1938, hangs in the Archivio Cantonale in Bellinzona; the artist was sent a photograph by Motta at the end of 1937, and then the artist travelled to Berne in the summer of 1938 to work on the portrait from life. The second portrait, half-length seated at a desk and dated 1939, is in the Haus Muller-Lombardi in Hospental, Switzerland, as part of the Adolfo Muller-Ury Stiftung. This was exhibited at the artist's last exhibition at French and Co, New York in the spring of 1947 and returned to Switzerland after his death in July that year.

Annually since 2004, the Geneva Institute for Democracy and Development presents the Giuseppe Motta Medal to people from any country or region of the world for exceptional achievement in the promotion of peace and democracy, human rights and sustainable development.

Political offices
Preceded by Josef Anton Schobinger	Member of the Swiss Federal Council; 1911–1940	Succeeded by Enrico Celio
