= Timeline of Swiss history =

This is a timeline of Swiss history, comprising important legal and territorial changes and political events in Switzerland and its predecessor states. To read about the background to these events, see History of Switzerland.

== 13th century ==
Year	Date	Event
1291	August	The three Waldstätte of Uri, Schwyz and Unterwalden signed the Federal Charter of 1291 establishing the Old Swiss Confederacy, a confederation for mutual defense and the adjudication of disputes.

== 14th century ==
Year	Date	Event
1307	8 November	The leaders of Uri, Schwyz and Unterwalden swore the Rütlischwur, an oath of unity and common defense, on the Rütli above Lake Lucerne.
1315	15 November	Battle of Morgarten. Swiss infantry ambushed and destroyed much of a Habsburg heavy cavalry army near Lake Ägeri.
1315	9 December	Following the victory at Morgarten, Uri, Schwyz and Unterwalden sign a second Federal Charter strengthening the Confederacy.
1332		Lucerne signs a mutual protection treaty with the three Confederates.
1367	29 January	Creation of the League of God's House in the Canton of Graubünden to resist the Bishopric of Chur and the Habsburgs.
1386	9 July	Battle of Sempach. Lucerne, Uri, Schwyz, Unterwalden and Zürich decisively defeat a Habsburg army. The victory begins to change the Confederation from a loose pact into a unified entity and allows expansion into former Habsburg lands.
1395	14 February	Creation of the Grey League in Graubünden as the abbot of Disentis Abbey, the Baron of Rhäzüns and the Baron of Sax-Misox sign an eternal alliance.

== 15th century ==
Year	Date	Event
1436	30 April	Death of Friedrich VII of Toggenburg, without an heir. Competing land claims in eastern Switzerland and western Austria led to the Old Zurich War.
1436	8 June	Creation of the League of the Ten Jurisdictions in Graubünden after the extinction of the Counts of Toggenburg.
1440-1450		Old Zurich War between Zurich and the Habsburgs against the remainder of the Confederation over the Toggenburg lands. At the end of the war, Zurich had to dissolve its alliance with the Habsburgs and rejoin the Confederation.

== 16th century ==
Year	Date	Event
1524	23 September	The Free State of the Three Leagues is formed from the League of God's House, the Grey League and the League of the Ten Jurisdictions

== 17th century ==
Year	Date	Event
1648	October	The Peace of Westphalia ends the Thirty Years War and contains a special provision on Switzerland, endorsing the process begun in 1499. With this treaty, European powers recognise the Swiss Confederation as an independent state.

Peace of Westphalia

== 18th century ==
Year	Date	Event
1798	28 January	The French Invasion of Switzerland begins, ending in late May.

== 19th century ==
Year	Date	Event
1843	June	The first Schweizerisches Gesangsfest, a singing festival, was held in Zürich.
1847	3 November	Sonderbund War: In the midst of a political crisis, troops from Uri, a member of the Sonderbund, a separate alliance of Catholic cantons of Switzerland, seized the Gotthard Pass between the northern and southern halves of the country.
1848	12 September	A new constitution was issued establishing Switzerland as a federal state with a bicameral Federal Assembly.
1874	19 April	The constitution was revised to establish free public education and the optional referendum, and to make it easier for Swiss citizens to move between cantons.
1877	19 June	The Aare flooded, causing significant damage.

== 20th century ==
Year	Date	Event
1918	30 September	Bankers in Zürich walked out in their first ever strike amidst growing unrest over the rising cost of living. A local general strike then broke out in support of their demand a pay rise and was successful.
1920	10 January	The League of Nations, an intergovernmental organization established for the purposes of collective security and international arbitration, came into existence, with Switzerland among its founding members.
1934		Creates numbered bank accounts, giving account holder anonymity.
1958	12 July	The Swiss government announced its intention to develop and build a nuclear arsenal.
1963	6 May	Switzerland joined the Council of Europe, a body dedicated to the promotion of good governance and human rights in Europe.
1971	7 February	A referendum granting women the right to vote in federal elections was approved with sixty-six percent of the vote.
1978	24 September	A referendum approved the secession of the French-speaking canton of Jura from the mostly German-speaking canton of Bern.

== 21st century ==
Year	Date	Event
2002	10 September	Switzerland joined the United Nations, an intergovernmental organization devoted to the preservation of world peace and economic development.
