= 1848 in Switzerland =

- Decades: 1820s; 1830s; 1840s; 1850s; 1860s
- See also: History of Switzerland; Timeline of Swiss history; List of years in Switzerland

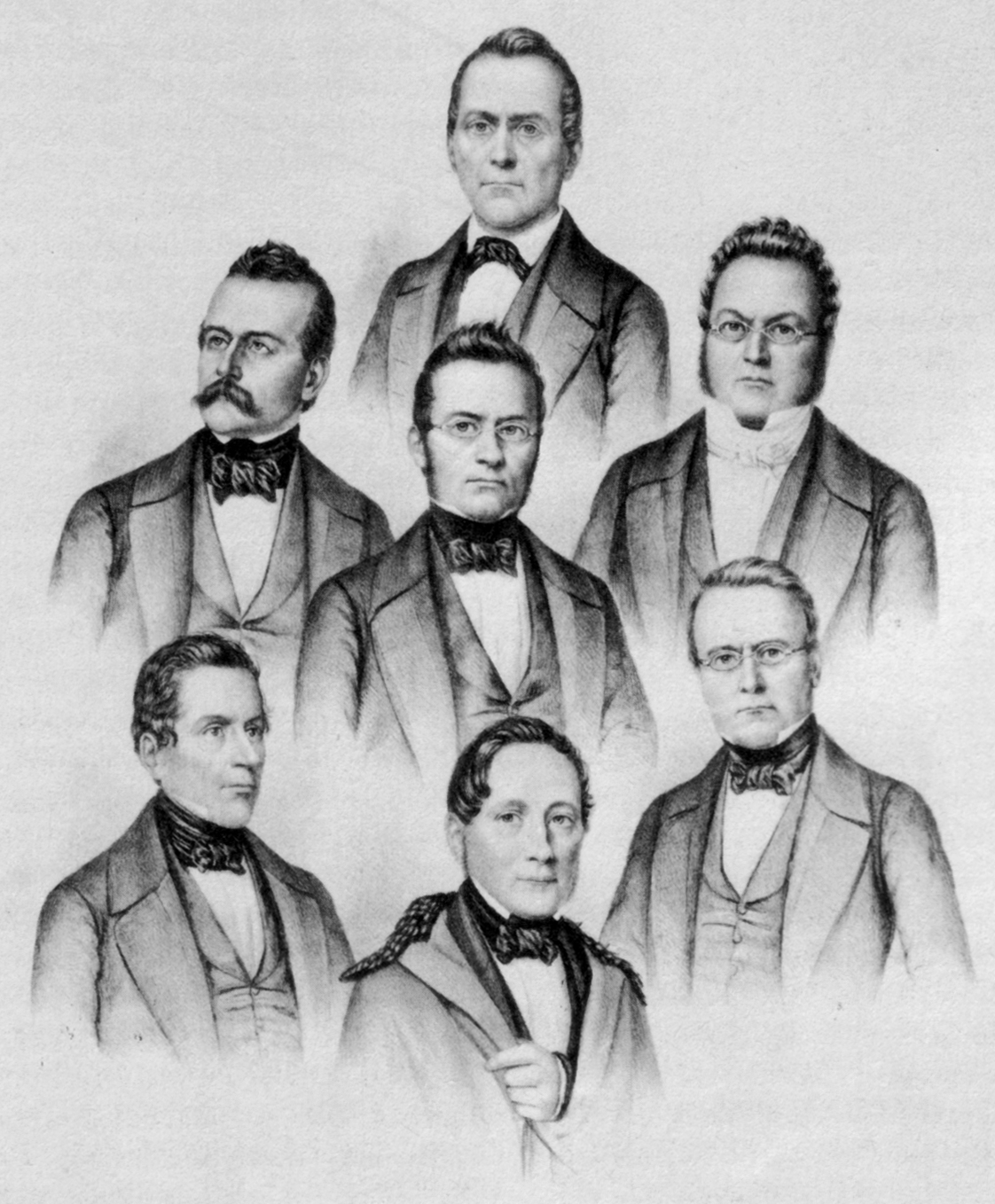
The first Swiss Federal Council, elected on November 16, 1848. Top: Josef Munzinger Center (from left to right): Ulrich Ochsenbein, Jonas Furrer, Henri Druey Bottom (from left to right): Stefano Franscini, Friedrich Frey-Herosé, Wilhelm Matthias Naeff.

Events from 1848 in Switzerland.

== Incumbents ==
- Federal Council (starting from November 16):
  - Ulrich Ochsenbein
  - Jonas Furrer (President)
  - Josef Munzinger
  - Henri Druey
  - Friedrich Frey-Herosé
  - Wilhelm Matthias Naeff
  - Stefano Franscini

== Events ==
- February – Federal troops leave Zug
- February – Pro-republic uprising in La Chaux-de-Fonds, Le Locle, and Val-de-Travers
- 1 March – Pro-republic forces overthrow the Council of State of the Canton of Neuchatel, declare the Canton a republic
- April – Federal troops leave Wallis
- 27 June – Draft constitution accepted by the Swiss Diet
- July – A Swiss constitutional referendum is held in July and August in the Cantons
- 12 September – New constitution declared accepted with 15 1/2 Cantons accepting, 6 1/2 voting against
- 6 November – Nationalrat and Ständerat meet in Bern for the first time
- 16 November – Seven members of Federal Council appointed. New constitution comes into force.
- The position of President of the Swiss Confederation is created, with the inaugural president being Jonas Furrer

== Births ==
- January 4 – Heinrich Suter, historian (died 1922)
- April 21/23 – Carl Rüedi, pulmonologist (died 1901)
- June 30 – Paul Zweifel, gynecologist and physiologist (died 1927)
- September 1 – Auguste Forel, myrmecologist, neuroanatomist and psychiatrist (died 1931)
- October 24 – William Foster Apthorp, musician (died 1913)
- November 12 – Eduard Müller, politician (died 1919)
- November 28 – Paul Charles Dubois, neuropathologist (died 1918)
- Pierre-Georges Jeanniot, painter, designer, watercolorist, and engraver (died 1934)
- Adolfo Kind, chemical engineer and one of the fathers of Italian skiing (died 1907)
- Andrew Mattei, Swiss-Italian winemaker (died 1931)
- Auguste Baud-Bovy, painter (died 1949)

== Deaths ==
- June 27 – Heinrich Zschokke, author and reformer (born 1771)
