= 1850 in Switzerland =

- Decades: 1830s; 1840s; 1850s; 1860s; 1870s
- See also: History of Switzerland; Timeline of Swiss history; List of years in Switzerland

The following is a list of events, births, and deaths in 1850 in Switzerland.

== Incumbents ==
- Federal Council:
  - Ulrich Ochsenbein
  - Jonas Furrer
  - Josef Munzinger
  - Henri Druey (President)
  - Friedrich Frey-Herosé
  - Wilhelm Matthias Naeff
  - Stefano Franscini

== Events ==
- March – The first federal population census in Switzerland takes place
- May 7 – A single currency, the Swiss franc, is imposed to replace cantonal currencies in the first Federal Coinage Act
- October 1 – Der Bund is established
- The Swiss Federal Council asks two British engineers to design plans for a railway network for the Swiss Confederation
- The Swiss Post issues its first postage stamps, the local mail and rayon stamps of Switzerland
- Bieler Tagblatt is established

== Births ==
- February 23 – César Ritz, hotelier (d. 1918)
- August 9 – Johann Büttikofer, zoologist (d. 1929)

== Deaths ==
- November 30 – Germain Henri Hess, chemist and doctor (b. 1802)
