= 1853 in Switzerland =

- Decades: 1830s; 1840s; 1850s; 1860s; 1870s
- See also: History of Switzerland; Timeline of Swiss history; List of years in Switzerland

The following is a list of events, births, and deaths in 1853 in Switzerland.

== Incumbents ==
- Federal Council:
  - Ulrich Ochsenbein
  - Jonas Furrer
  - Josef Munzinger
  - Henri Druey
  - Friedrich Frey-Herosé
  - Wilhelm Matthias Naeff (President)
  - Stefano Franscini

== Events ==
- February 4 – Johann Jakob Speiser, Achilles Bischoff, and Karl Geigy establish the Swiss Central Railway
- Tissot, a Swiss watch company, is founded
- The Swiss Northern Railway merges with the Lake Constance and Rheinfall Railways to create the Swiss Northeastern Railway
- Revue Thommen is established under the name Waldenburg
- Diplomatic relations are established by the United States
- Grunerite is discovered and named after Emmanuel-Louis Gruner, the Swiss-French chemist who first analyzed it

== Births ==
- March 14 – Ferdinand Hodler, painter (d. 1918)
- September 14 – Marc-Émile Ruchet, French-speaking politician (d. 1912)
- December 11 – Jacob Wackernagel, linguist, Indo-Europeanist, and scholar of Sanskrit (d. 1938)
- Christian Klucker, mountain guide (d. 1928)
- Luigi Rossi, painter (d. 1923)

== Deaths ==
- September 15 – Théophile Voirol, general in the French Republican Army (b. 1781)
- November 28 – Hans Bendel, painter (b. 1814)
