= 1849 in Switzerland =

- Decades: 1820s; 1830s; 1840s; 1850s; 1860s
- See also: History of Switzerland; Timeline of Swiss history; List of years in Switzerland

The following is a list of events, births, and deaths in 1849 in Switzerland.

== Incumbents ==
- Federal Council:
  - Ulrich Ochsenbein
  - Jonas Furrer (President)
  - Josef Munzinger
  - Henri Druey
  - Friedrich Frey-Herosé
  - Wilhelm Matthias Naeff
  - Stefano Franscini

== Events ==
- A uniform postal service, the Swiss Post, is introduced.
- The Museum of Cultures is established

== Births ==
- January 30 – Josef Anton Schobinger, politician (died 1911)
- March 28 – August Fetscherin, physician (died 1882)
- April 12 – Albert Heim, geologist (died 1937)
- April 24 – Alfred Kleiner, physicist (died 1916)
- May 19 – Adrien Lachenal, politician (died 1918)
- May 22 – Louis Perrier, member of the Swiss Federal Council (died 1913)
- July 13 – Eugen Huber, jurist and creator of the Swiss Civil Code (died 1923)
- December 29 – Otto Stoll, linguist and ethnologist (died 1922)

=== No known date ===
- Albert Butz, Swiss-American inventor and businessman (died 1905)

== Deaths ==
- January 6 – Johann Caspar von Orelli, Swiss classical scholar (born 1787)
- May 18 – Samuel Amsler, Swiss engraver (b. 1791)
- August 12 – Albert Gallatin, Swiss-American politician (born 1761)
- October 25 – Édouard Bovet, Swiss watchmaker (born 1797)
- November 13 – Marie Manning, Swiss domestic servant and murderer (born 1821)
- November 14 – Karl Adams, Swiss mathematician (born 1811)
- December 27 – Jacques-Laurent Agasse, Swiss animal and landscape painter (born 1767)

=== No known date ===
- Frédéric Fregevize, Swiss landscape painter (born 1770)
