= 1852 in Switzerland =

- Decades: 1830s; 1840s; 1850s; 1860s; 1870s
- See also: History of Switzerland; Timeline of Swiss history; List of years in Switzerland

The following is a list of events, births, and deaths in 1852 in Switzerland.

== Incumbents ==
- Federal Council:
  - Ulrich Ochsenbein
  - Jonas Furrer (President)
  - Josef Munzinger
  - Henri Druey
  - Friedrich Frey-Herosé
  - Wilhelm Matthias Naeff
  - Stefano Franscini

== Events ==
- Rayon IV stamps are abandoned and become part of Rayon III
- A treaty is reached between the government of Baden and the Swiss Confederation on how to build Basel Badischer Bahnhof
- Alfred Escher, among others, helps push through a railway law saying that railway construction and operation should be left to private companies
- Lavey-Morcles is created by a merger of Morcles and Lavey

== Births ==
- June 2 – Eduard Spelterini, pioneer of ballooning and aerial photography (d. 1931)
- June 28 – Hans Huber, composer (d. 1921)
- July 31 – Hans Renold, engineer (d. 1943)
- August 11 – Friedrich Gottlieb Stebler, agriculturalist and ethnographer (d. 1935)
- October 14 – Otto Binswanger, psychiatrist and neurologist (d. 1929)
- December 11 – Karl Moor, Communist and German spy in World War I (d. 1932)

== Deaths ==
- François-Louis Cailler, first Swiss chocolate producer (b. 1796)
