= 1854 in Switzerland =

- Decades: 1830s; 1840s; 1850s; 1860s; 1870s
- See also: History of Switzerland; Timeline of Swiss history; List of years in Switzerland

The following is a list of events, births, and deaths in 1854 in Switzerland.

== Incumbents ==
- Federal Council:
  - Ulrich Ochsenbein then Jakob Stämpfli
  - Jonas Furrer
  - Josef Munzinger
  - Henri Druey
  - Friedrich Frey-Herosé (President)
  - Wilhelm Matthias Naeff
  - Stefano Franscini

== Events ==
- August 27 – Alfred Wills ascends the Wetterhorn, starting the golden age of alpinism
- December 19 – The Basel SBB railway station is opened
- The West Switzerland Company is formed
- The United Bank of Switzerland is formed in the form of the Swiss Bank Corporation when six private banking firms pool their resources
- ETH Zurich (The Federal Polytechnic Institute) is established.

== Art and literature ==
- The fables of Jean Jacques Porchat are reissued under the new title Fables et paraboles

== Births ==
- March 30 – Alfred Ilg, engineer (d. 1916)
- April 19 – Emma Pieczynska-Reichenbach, abolitionist and feminist (d. 1927)
- August 2 – Eugène Ruffy, politician (d. 1919)
- August 30 – Edmond Louis Budry, hymn writer (d. 1932)
- September 15 – Traugott Sandmeyer, chemist (d. 1922)
- September 23 – Charles Soret, physicist and chemist (d. 1904)
- September 24 – Robert Keller, botanist (d. 1939)

== Deaths ==
- May 12 – Melchior Berri, architect (b. 1801)
- October 22 – Jeremias Gotthelf, novelist (b. 1797)
- November 18 – Alberich Zwyssig, composer of the Swiss Psalm (b. 1808)
- John James Chalon, painter (b. 1778)
