= 1851 in Switzerland =

- Decades: 1830s; 1840s; 1850s; 1860s; 1870s
- See also: History of Switzerland; Timeline of Swiss history; List of years in Switzerland

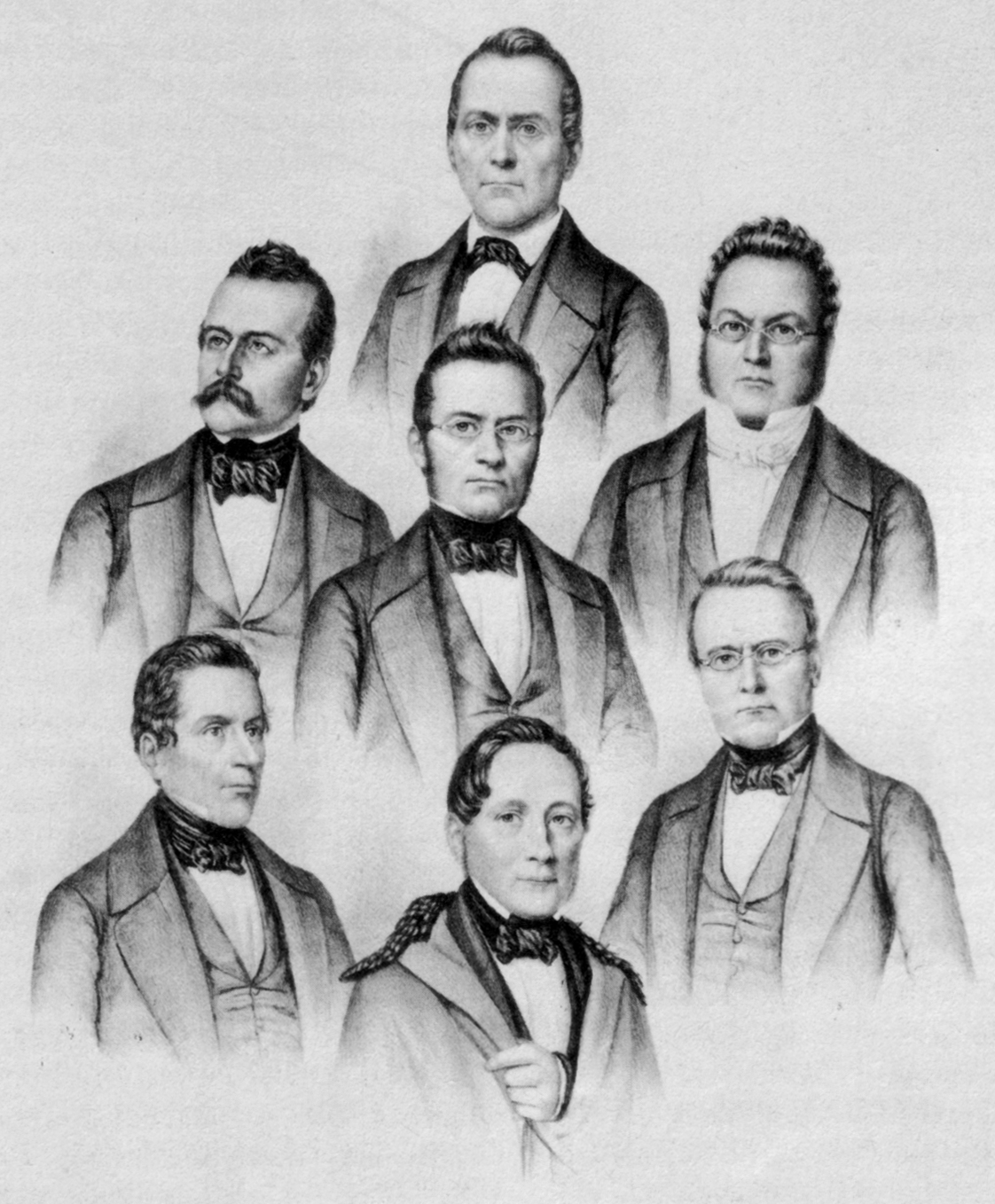
The members of the first Swiss Federal Council in 1851.

The following is a list of events, births, and deaths in 1851 in Switzerland.

== Incumbents ==
- Federal Council:
  - Ulrich Ochsenbein
  - Jonas Furrer
  - Josef Munzinger (President)
  - Henri Druey
  - Friedrich Frey-Herosé
  - Wilhelm Matthias Naeff
  - Stefano Franscini

== Events ==
- Patek Philippe & Co. is founded
- Swiss Federal Council first considers official representation in the Philippines
- The Eidgenössischer Stutzer 1851, the first service rifle used by the Swiss armed forces to be procured by the federal government, goes into service
- The telegraph is organized in Switzerland
- All Swiss weights and measures are unified

== Births ==
- January 3 – Elisabeth Flühmann, teacher and women's rights activist (d. 1929)
- October 6 – Wilhelm Oechsli, historian (d. 1919)

== Deaths ==
- Abraham Constantin, enamel painter (b. 1785)
