= Complimentary election =

Certain elections in Switzerland (1854–1896)

Complimentary elections (German: Komplimentswahl; French: Élection de compliment) for acting Federal Councilors of Switzerland (members of the Swiss Government) to the National Council (lower chamber of the Swiss Parliament) were held in the second half of the 19th century. They were meant to underline the popular support of the Federal Councilors which were elected by the National Councilors. In practice, the Federal Councilors did not take office as National Councilors after being elected but resigned and kept acting as Federal Councilors. The practice of complimentary elections began in 1854 and was discontinued in 1896.

== Name ==
The name Complimentary election was coined in 1881 by Simon Kaiser, a member of the National Council from Solothurn. Before it was also called a Confidence Vote, or Courtesy Election as with these elections, the people of the canton of origin of the Federal Councilor were able to show the popular support which the Federal Councilor was able to count on.

== Context ==
Article 77 of the Swiss Constitution mentions that neither members of the Council of States (upper chamber of the Swiss Parliament) nor members of the Federal Council (Swiss Government) are allowed to be also members of the National Council. Article 96 mentions that every citizen able to elected into the National Council can also be elected into the Federal Council. The same article also regulates that the Federal Council is to be newly elected after every election of the National Council. The Federal Councilors were not formally elected by the Swiss citizens, but the members of the National Council. If the Federal Councilor did not win the complimentary election, he was likely not going to be confirmed for another term by the National Council.

== History ==
The practice of the Complimentary Elections began in 1854. Simon König introduced a motion into the National Council aiming to achieve a revision of the electoral law which would prohibit the Federal Councilors' election into the National Council. Kaiser reasoned that the possibility of such an election was unconstitutional. His motion was mainly directed against by the candidacy to the National Council of the Solothurnese Federal Councilor Bernhard Hammer. The Federal Council responded in 1883 attempting to explicitly allow such elections. In March 1885, the issue was discussed in the National Council and its respective commission was also in favor to adapt the laws accordingly, but the law was eventually dismissed by the National Council and also the Council of States didn't raise the issue again. As the beginning of the end of the practice is seen the non-candidacy in 1887 by Adolf Deucher, from the Canton Thurgau. In later years, other Federal Councilors followed his example and also declined to become a candidate. The last candidate to the Complimentary Elections was Adrian Lachenal in 1896.

== Notable examples ==
=== Stefano Franscini ===
In the 1854 elections to the National Council, Federal Councilor Stefano Franscini was not elected in his Canton of Ticino, who then was put forward as a candidate in the Canton of Schaffhausen, with members of his party strongly supporting his political positions. In Schaffhausen, he was elected and following also re-elected as Federal Councilor by the National Council.

=== Ulrich Ochsenbein ===
The Federal Councilor Ulrich Ochsenbein lost to Jakob Stämpfli in October 1854, who then in December the same year was elected into the Federal Council by the Nacional Council instead to Ochsenbein.

=== Wilhelm Naeff ===
Wilhelm Naeff was more lucky, as after he was not able to win the elections in 1866, he just didn't become a candidate in the next elections and was re-elected to the Federal Council anyway, even though with slim margins.

=== Josef Martin Knüsel ===
Josef Martin Knüsel was a candidate in 1866, 1869, 1872 and 1875. Until the last time, he won all elections comfortably, but in the last one he lost and resigned before awaiting the verdict of the National Council.
