= Josef Martin Knüsel =

Swiss politician (1813–1889)

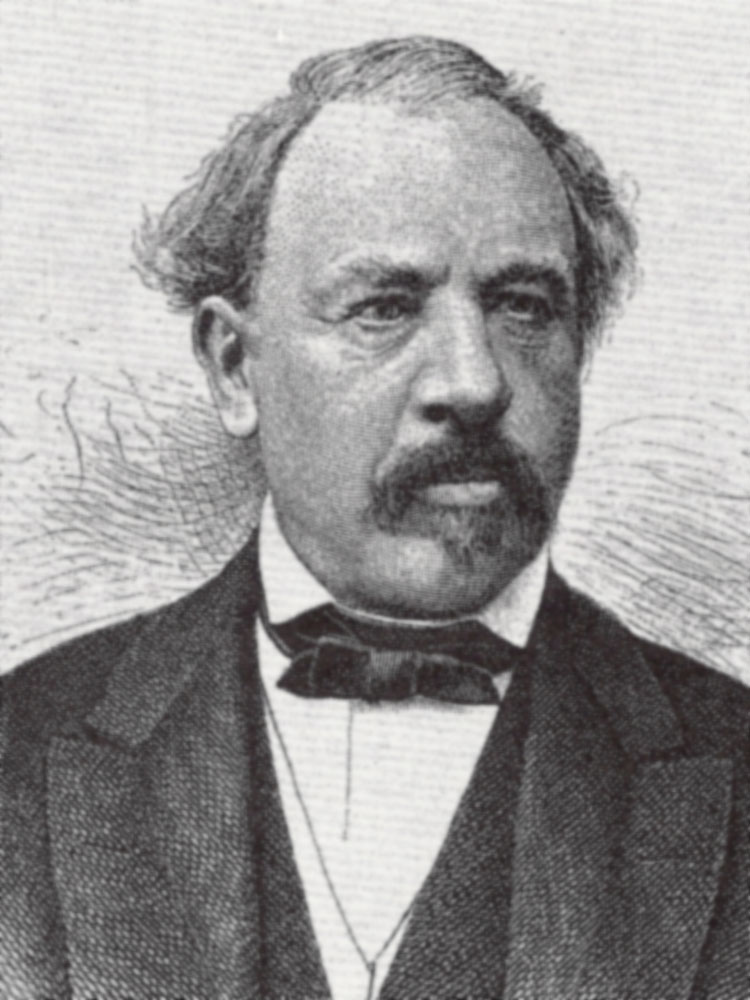

Member of the Federal Council of Switzerland
- In office 1855–1875

Member of the National Council
- In office 1854–1855

Member of the Executive Council of Lucerne
- In office 1852–1854

Personal details
- Born: 16 November 1813 Lucerne, Switzerland
- Died: 14 January 1889 (aged 75) Lucerne, Switzerland
- Spouse: Bernardine Brunner-Knüsel
- Education: Jurisprudience

Melchior Josef Martin Knüsel (16 November 1813 – 14 January 1889) was a Swiss jurist and politician from the Liberal Radical Party (FDP) and member of the Federal Council of Switzerland over which he presided in 1861 and 1866. Before he was also a member of the Grand Council and the Executive Council of Lucerne and also of the National Council.

== Education and early life ==
Knüsel was born into a Catholic household on the 16 November 1813 in Lucerne to Melchior Josef and Josefa (born Küttel) Knüsel. His father had a grocery store and he grew up in a financially stable household. He attended primary and high school in Lucerne and decided to study jurisprudence. In the 1830s he studied law at the University of Göttingen between 1834 and 36 and the following year at Heidelberg. In 1838 he graduated with the Lucernese State Exam. He then stayed for some months in Romont and Lausanne to further his knowledge of the French language.

== Professional career ==
In 1838 Knüsel was appointed a provisory clerk of the criminal court and in 1839 he became a criminal judge. In 1841 the conservative leaning Grand Council of Lucerne elected him to become the provincial prosecutor despite the fact that he had become a member of the Liberal party. He stayed the provincial prosecutor until 1852. Prominent investigations he led were the one against Jakob Robert Steiger and his rebels and one against some members of the clergy of the Monastery of the Franciscans.

== Political career ==
In 1847 Knüsel succeeded his father into the Grand Council of Lucerne representing Weggis. He was formally elected to the Grand Council of Lucerne in 1848 but declined to become a member of the Council of States. He was in favor of an amnesty for the rebels around Jakob Robert Steiger in 1849. When Steiger resigned from the Executive Council in 1852 after he failed in his aim to support the construction of railways by the state, Knüsel was then considered his successor. In 1853 he was involved in the development of a railway connecting Basel and Lucerne over Sursee. For this he was in frequent contact with Johann Jakob Speiser, the president of the Swiss Central Railways. In September 1854 Knüsel was able to prevent violent riots against the grain merchants, who were accused of raising prices too much. Later the same year he was elected into the National Council of Switzerland.

=== Federal Councilor ===
Knüsel's election to the Federal Council was a surprise as after the death of the Federal Councilor Josef Munzinger, initially Casimir Pfyffer was the most voted candidate, but after Pfyffer failed to achieve the parliamentary majority of 72 votes in the first round, he declined. Knüsel was also a candidate, but only received 23 votes. Then Johann Jakob Stehlin was elected as the Federal Councilor on the 12 July, but he refused to accept his election as he didn't feel prepared for the office. Following Melchior Josef Martin Knüsel was again made a candidate and elected to the Swiss Federal Council on 14 July 1855. After several day he eventually accepted and became the first Federal Councilor from Canton Lucerne. He stayed a Federal Councilor for over 20 years until he resigned on 10 December 1875.

When he was in charge of the Department of Trade and Customs in 1860, he was in favor of a soon to be constructed tunnel through the Alps, to connect northern Europe with Italy. He saw with concerns the developments of France and the Austrian Empire to construct a railway over the Brenner or Mount Cenis and worried that in the case they succeed before Switzerland achieved its own tunnel, international traffic would lead around Switzerland which then would lose its central position. He reasoned that in case Switzerland would achieve a tunnel, then the country would become an economic hub for goods coming from the Italian Port of Genoa towards Northern Europe and the Swiss population would also have an enhanced access to the grains of northern Italy. He strongly favored the construction of the railway tunnel through the Gotthard massif instead of a variant through the Lukmanier. In 1873 the ideological gap between the reformists and the Catholics emerged as the reason of Knüsel's eventual loss in the Federal Council.

After Pope Pius IX. harshly criticised the Church Laws in Geneva and Solothurn, the Federal Council recalled the Swiss ambassador to the Holy See. Knüsel, as the only catholic in the Federal Council, did not support this step which caused some opposition in his canton Lucerne. When in 1875 the confirmative elections were to be held, he was made a candidate in a conservative district, where he didn't have a chance and lost, following which he resigned.

As an acting Federal Councillor, Knüsel was a candidate for the National Council in 1866, 1869, 1872 and 1875 in confirmative elections, which would formally confirm that he had enough popular support of the population.

==== Offices in the Federal Council ====
While in office Knüsel held the following departments:

- Department of Finance (1855 - 1856)
- Department of Trade and Customs (1857)
- Department of Justice and Police (1858)
- Department of Trade and Customs (1859 - 1860)
- Political Department (1861) as President of the Swiss Confederation
- Department of Finance (1862 - 1863)
- Department of Justice and Police (1864 - 1865)
- Political Department (1866) as President of the Swiss Confederation
- Department of Justice and Police (1867 - 1873)
- Federal Department of Home Affairs (1874 - 1875)

As a civilian (non-military), he was not allowed to become involved in the Military Department. He became President of the Confederation twice, in 1861 and 1866.

== Later life ==
Knüsel resigned from politics in 1875 and returned to Lucerne where in 1876 he was elected the President of the Lucerne branch of the Swiss Welfare Association (SGG). The following year the SGG held their annual congress in Lucerne. He supported Free Trade and the workers, for which he demanded education and machinery to be able to compete with the large corporations. In 1878, he returned to politics when he was elected into the National Council until 1881. On the 14 January 1889, Knüsel died after having been treated for rheumatism and a heart condition.

== Personal life ==
In 1847 Knüsel married Bernardine Brunner from Ebikon. Their marriage stayed childless. On 17 July he saved the life of a child that fell into Lake Lucerne, for which he was officially recognized by the President of the Executive Council Alois Singer. Later that year, he was able to be liberated from the remainder of his military service by paying 80 Swiss Francs. His wife Bernardine Brunner was a known friend of Agata Pioda the wife of the former Federal Councillor and Swiss Ambassador to Rome Giovanni Battista Pioda.

Political offices
Preceded by Josef Munzinger	Member of the Swiss Federal Council; 1855–1875	Succeeded by Joachim Heer
