= To serve and disappear =

Swiss political maxim

"To serve and disappear" (French: Servir et disparaître) is a Swiss political maxim. It expresses a political ethos according to which those who lead put personal interests behind service to the cause and to the public. This includes, in particular, members of the Federal Council withdrawing from public life at the end of their careers and not giving public advice to their successors.

The slogan comes from "Old Bern" – the city and republic of Bern, which collapsed in 1798 and whose aristocratic rulers boasted a particularly reserved and frugal administration. It recalls the tradition of the Roman dictator Cincinnatus, who gave up his power to devote himself again to agriculture.

== Usage ==
The phrase is usually given in French, even in German-speaking contexts. Retiring officials still cite it as a personal motto. When Federal Councillor Guy Parmelin announced his resignation in October 2026, Le Matin reported that his watchword for what came next was “Servir et disparaître,” an exit it described as direct and without grandiloquence. Other former Federal Councillors have been strongly criticised for not following the rule.

The maxim is often linked to how the Swiss government is built: with the seven members of the Federal Council together constituting the executive branch and collectively serving as head of state, with no designated leader. The presidency is a rotating role, and while a member can be president more than once, it can not be in consecutive years. Federal councillors also traditionally resign before their term ends.

== Recent history ==
The unspoken rule of retired members of the Federal Council to disappear from public politics has been in decline in recent decades, according to commentators. Several former Federal Council members, such as Joseph Deiss, have on occasion commented on matters of national politics and international relations.

According to political scientist Michael Hermann, the change started with the voting out of Christoph Blocher in 2007, who was and subsequently remained highly active in partisan politics.

== See also ==
- Magic formula
