= Frédéric Fregevize =

Swiss painter

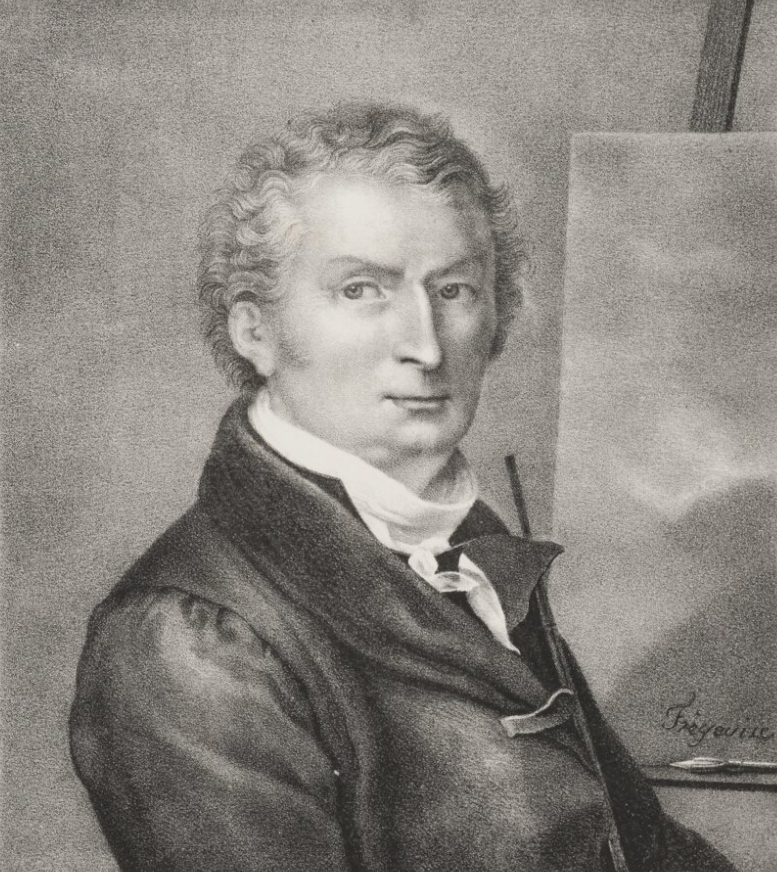
Self-portrait (lithograph by Spengler & Cie)

Frédéric Fregevize (1770 – 9 October 1849) a Swiss landscape painter. Born in Geneva, he lived for a long time in Berlin, and was elected in 1820 to membership of the Prussian Academy of Arts; he returned to Geneva in 1829, and went to Dessau in 1839. The National Gallery in Berlib contains views painted by him of The Lake of Geneva, and The Valley of the Rhone, near Geneva.
