= Hans Bendel =

Swiss painter and illustrator

Hans Sigmund Bendel (18 October 1814 – 28 November 1853) was a Swiss painter and illustrator.

== Life ==
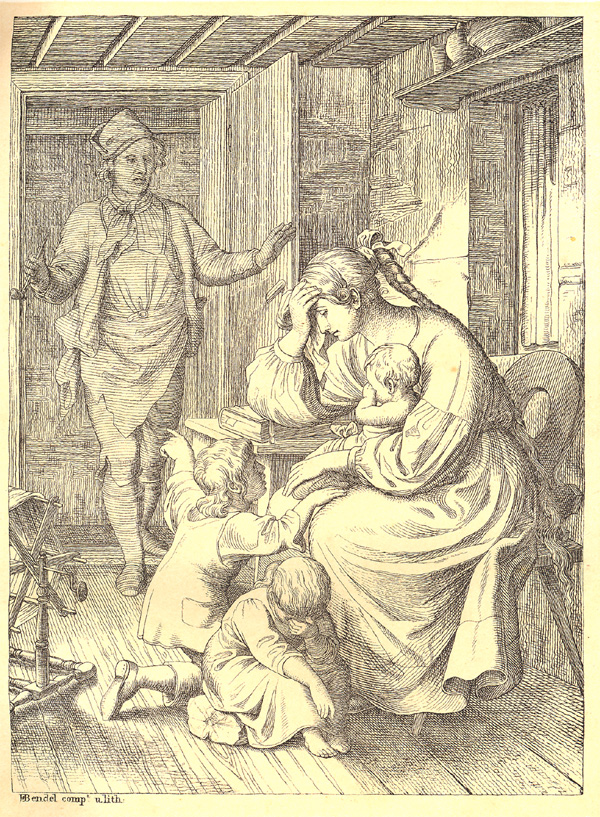
Illustration for Pestalozzi's "Lienhard und Gertrud".

Hans Bendel, of Schaffhausen, in Switzerland, was an historical painter and lithographer, and attended the Academy of Munich, under Kaulbach.

The son of a master tailor, Bendel completed an apprenticeship as a painter. During his travels as a youth, he visited Munich, where he found work as a craftsman at the Munich Residenz while he improved his painting. He befriended Wilhelm von Kaulbach who helped Bendel continue his education at the Academy of Fine Arts, Munich. From October 1838 until May 1839, he practiced painting and studied the classics in Rome with his teacher.

Bendel worked as a successful book illustrator and historical painter. His works include illustrations for Goethe, for Pestalozzi's Lienhard und Gertrud, for Hebel's Poems, and for Das Nüny Glöckly in Schaffhausen (the Nine o'clock Bell at Schaffhausen), a poem by Johann Heinrich Maurer-de Constant.

He began a series of cartoons with scenes from Swiss history, but died in 1853 before they were completed.
