= 1848 Swiss constitutional referendum =

July and August 1848

Results
Choice	Votes	%
Yes	145,584	72.83%
No	54,320	27.17%

A constitutional referendum was held in Switzerland in July and August 1848, the first referendum on record in the Swiss Confederation. The new constitution was approved by 72.8% of voters and a majority of cantons.

== Background ==
In order to pass, any amendments to the constitution needed a double majority; a majority of the popular vote and majority of the cantons. The decision of each canton was based on the vote in that canton. Full cantons counted as one vote, whilst half cantons counted as half.

== Results ==
Choice	Popular vote		Cantons		
Choice	Votes	%	Full	Half	Total
For	145,584	72.8	14	3	15.5
Against	54,320	27.2	5	3	6.5
Invalid/blank votes		–	–	–	–
Total	199,904	100	19	6	22
Source: Nohlen & Stöver
