= Jakob Stämpfli =

Member of the Swiss Federal Council

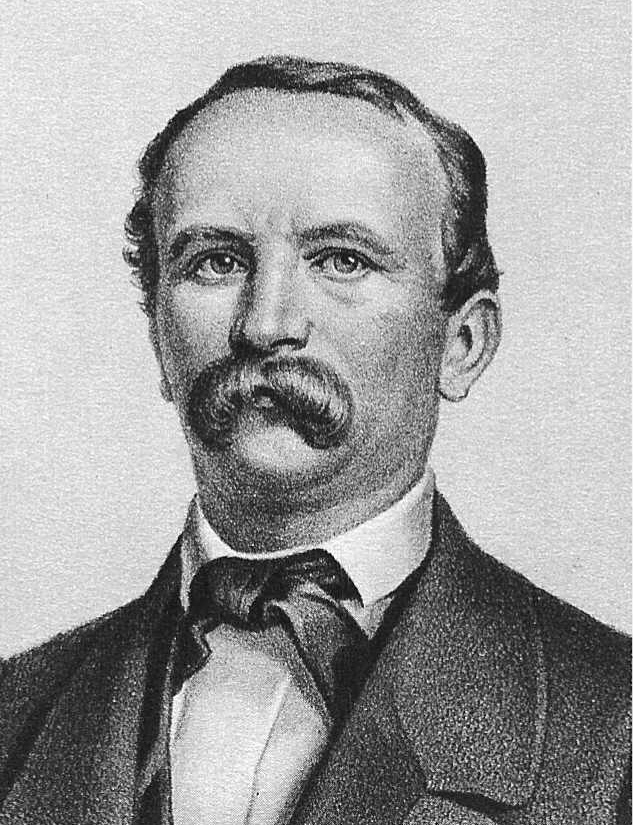
Jakob Stämpfli

Jakob Stämpfli (23 February 1820 – 15 May 1879) was a Swiss politician and member of the Swiss Federal Council (1854–1863).

He was elected to the Federal Council of Switzerland on 6 December 1854, and left office on 31 December 1863. He was affiliated with the Free Democratic Party of Switzerland.

During his time in office he held the following departments:

- Department of Justice and Police (1855)
- Political Department as President of the Confederation (1856)
- Department of Finance (1857–1858)
- Political Department as President of the Confederation (1859)
- Military Department (1860–1861)
- Political Department as President of the Confederation (1862)
- Military Department (1863)

Jakob Stämpfli was also a member of the international tribunal that ruled on the Alabama Claims in 1871.

Political offices
Preceded by Johann Konrad Kern	President of the Swiss National Council; 1851	Succeeded by Johann Trog
Preceded by Ulrich Ochsenbein	Member of the Swiss Federal Council; 1854–1863	Succeeded by Karl Schenk
Preceded by Louis Ruchonnet	President of the Swiss National Council; 1875	Succeeded by Emil Frey
