= Local mail and rayon stamps of Switzerland =

Swiss postage stamps issued 1850 and 1852

The local mail and rayon stamps of 1850 and 1852 constituted the first series of postage stamps issued by the Swiss Post. In philately, they are among the most sought-after Swiss stamps, with a 5 rappen Rayon I stamp selling for the record price of CHF 348,000 (USD 293,000) at auction in 2008.

After the reconstitution of Switzerland as a federal state in 1848, the authority to operate a postal service passed from the cantons to the Confederation, and the federal postal service was founded in 1849. Its local mail and rayon stamps were the first definitive stamps valid in all of Switzerland, although the stamps issued by the postal authorities of the cantons of Geneva, Basel-Stadt and Zürich remained concurrently valid until 1854, when all stamps were supplanted by the "Sitting Helvetia" series of federal stamps.

== Rayons ==
The first Swiss postal regulations divided Switzerland, for the purpose of mailing letters weighing no more than half a lot, into four rayons. These were defined by the distance or road transport time (whichever was higher) between sender and recipient. A special, lower rate applied to letters mailed within a municipality. Rayon IV, defined by a distance of more than 192 km or a transport time of more than 40 hours, for which a postage of 20 Rappen was due, was abandoned in 1852 and became part of Rayon III. No stamps were ever issued for it.

Stamp	Charging area (Rayon)	Postage	Transport hours max.	Transport distance max.	Date of first issue
	Local mail	2½ rappen	Within the municipality	Within the municipality	May 1850
	Rayon I	5 rappen	2 hours	9.6 km	1 October 1850
	Rayon II	10 rappen	10 hours	48 km	1 October 1850
	Rayon III	15 rappen	40 hours	192 km	1 January 1852

== Stamp design ==
The stamps depict a bugle atop the Swiss coat of arms. They are labeled with their denomination and with the corresponding rayon or, as the case may be, as stamps for local mail. All stamps were issued in German and French, with the French versions substituting "cts." for "Rp." and "Poste locale" for "Orts-Post". They were printed lithographically on imperforate white paper.
