= Jonas Furrer =

1st president of the Swiss Confederation

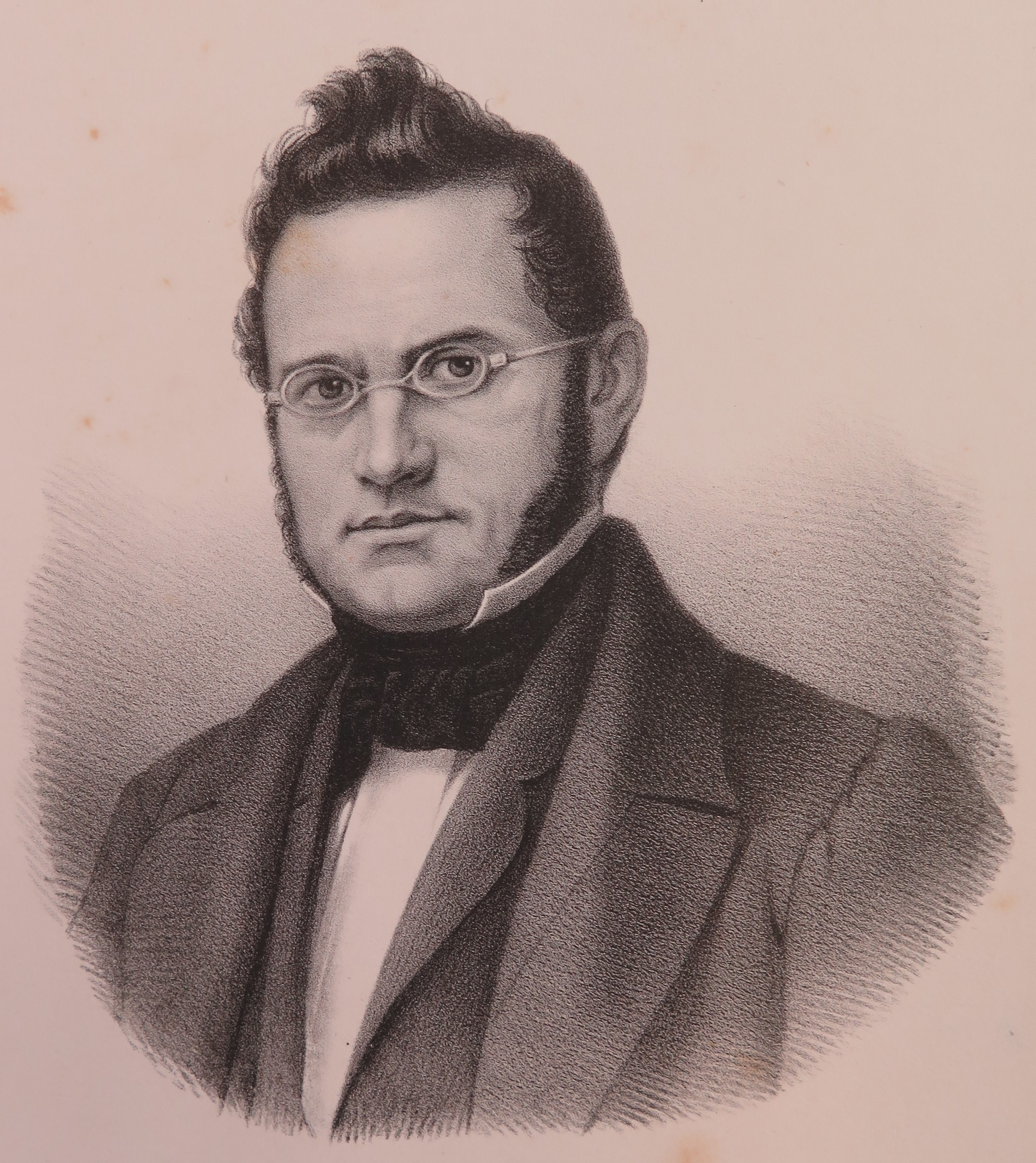

Member of the Swiss Federal Council
- In office 16 November 1848 – 25 July 1861

President of the Confederation
- In office 21 November 1848 – 31 December 1849
- Preceded by: Office established
- Succeeded by: Henri Druey

President of the Confederation
- In office 1 January 1852 – 31 December 1852
- Preceded by: Josef Munzinger
- Succeeded by: Wilhelm Matthias Naeff

President of the Confederation
- In office 1 January 1855 – 31 December 1855
- Preceded by: Friedrich Frey-Herosé
- Succeeded by: Jakob Stämpfli

Personal details
- Born: 3 March 1805 Winterthur, canton of Zürich, Switzerland
- Died: 25 July 1861 (aged 56) Bad Ragaz, Canton of St. Gallen, Switzerland
- Party: Free Democratic Party

Jonas Furrer (3 March 1805 – 25 July 1861) was a Swiss lawyer and politician who served as a member of the Federal Council, from 1848 to 1861, and as the first president of the Swiss Confederation from 1848 to 1849, and again in 1852, 1855 and 1858. He was one of the leading figures in the foundation of Switzerland as a federal state. He was a member of the Radical Party.

== Biography ==
Furrer was born in Winterthur, in the canton of Zürich, on 3 March 1805, the son of Anna Magdalena Hanhart and Jonas Furrer, a locksmith. He received his early education in his hometown, and in 1824 went to study law at the University of Zürich. He soon continued his studies in Heidelberg, and between 1825 and 1826 studied at the University of Göttingen. After finishing his education, Furrer returned to Winterthur and established himself as a jurist.

Furrer was admitted to the bar in 1832, and that year he married Friederike Sulzer, daughter of Johann Heinrich Sulzer. In 1834, aged 29, he was elected to the Cantonal Council of Zürich. He served until 1839, and was again elected in 1842. At the Cantonal Council, he was the leader of the Liberal opposition to the Conservative government of Johann Kaspar Bluntschli. In 1845 he became president of the Council of State of Zürich.

In 1847, Furrer was appointed member of the commission tasked with reaching a peaceful settlement for the Sonderbund War. After the Federal victory and the end of the civil war, in 1848 he was elected by the canton of Zurich to the Council of States. For his significant contribution to the drafting of the 1848 constitution, which established Switzerland as a federal state, Furrer was elected President of the Swiss Confederation by the legislature, becoming the head of the newly created executive power of Switzerland, the seven-member Federal Council.

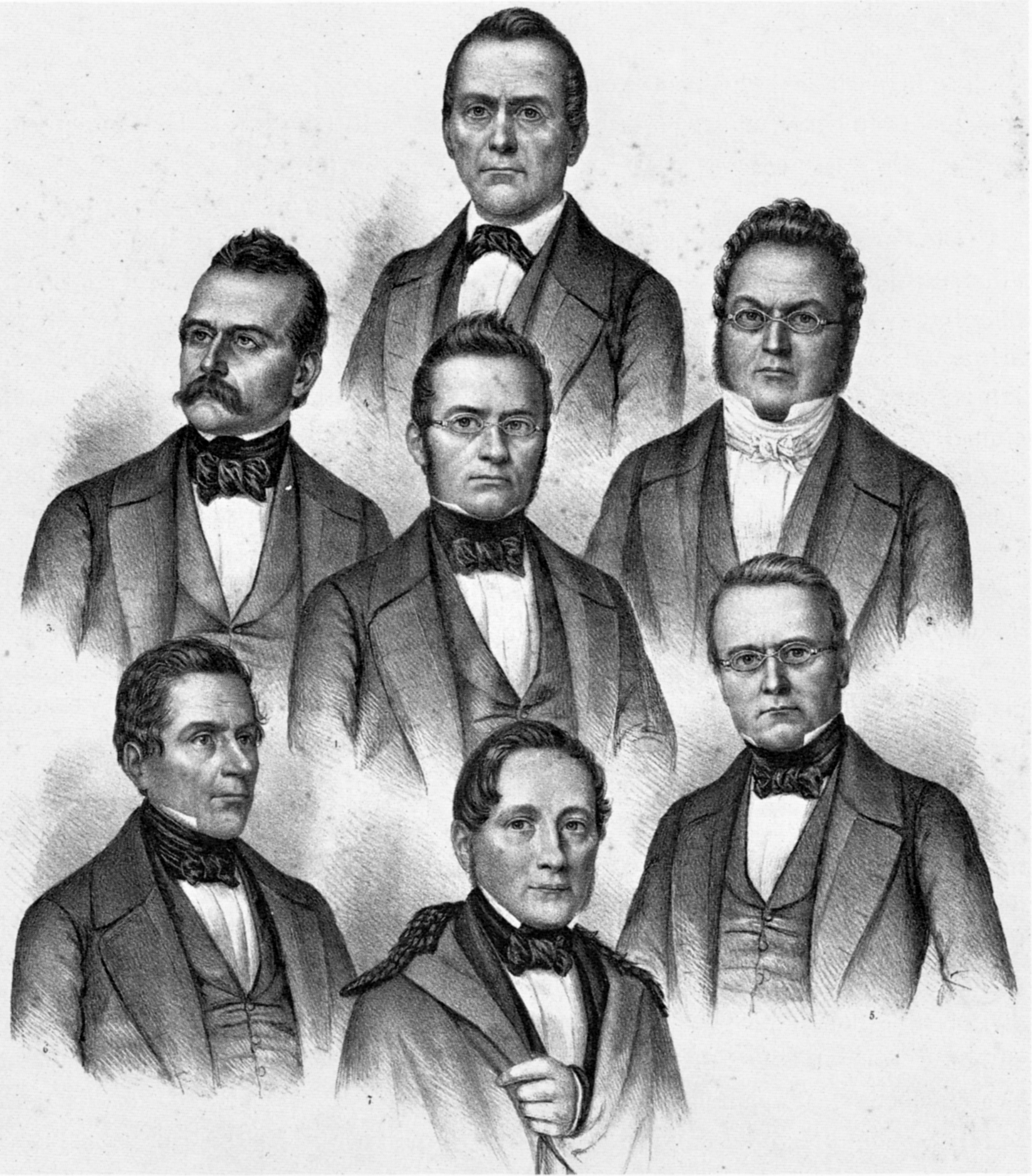
The first Federal Council, 1848 (president Jonas Furrer in the middle)

Furrer served as Federal Councilor from 1848 until his death in 1861. During his time in office, he headed a number of government departments, most notably the Federal Department of Justice and Police due to the reforms he implemented, and also distinguished himself as head of the Political Department for his diplomatic skill. He resolved the question regarding stateless persons, enacted a law in 1850 protecting religiously mixed couples, and founded government agencies responsible for settling conflicts of jurisdiction between the Confederation and the cantons.

== Ministries ==
During his time as a member of the Federal Council, he presided over the following departments:

- Political Department (1848–1849)
- Department of Justice and Police (1850–1851)
- Political Department (1852)
- Department of Justice and Police (1853–1854)
- Political Department (1855)
- Department of Justice and Police (1856–1857)
- Political Department (1858)
- Department of Justice and Police (1859–1861)

== Personal life ==
Furrer was a member of the masonic Lodge Akazia at Winterthur, and was elected Grand Orator of the Grand Lodge Alpina of Switzerland in 1844. He died in office on 25 July 1861. He wrote Das Erbrecht der Stadt Winterthur (“Inheritance law in the city of Winterthur”, 1832).

Political offices
| Preceded by none (The first) | President of the Council of States; 1848 | Succeeded by François Briatte |
| Preceded by n/a one of the first seven | Member of the Swiss Federal Council; 1848–1861 | Succeeded by Jakob Dubs |
