= Ulrich Ochsenbein =

Swiss politician (1811–1890)

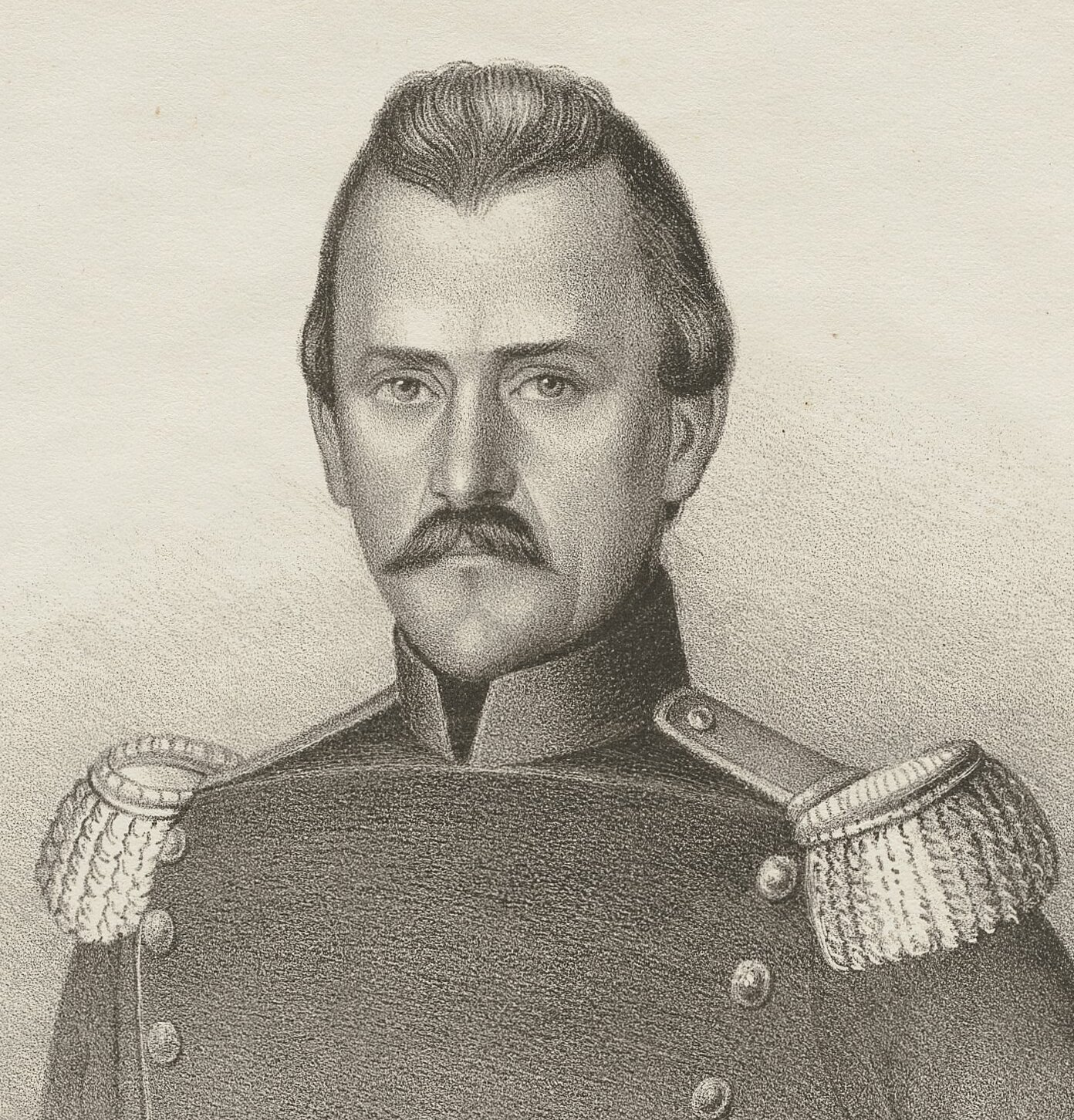
- Official portrait, c. 1848

Member of the Federal Council (Switzerland)
- In office 16 November 1848 – 31 December 1854
- Constituency: Canton of Bern

Member of the National Council (Switzerland)
- In office 6 November 1848 – 16 November 1848

Personal details
- Born: Johann Ulrich Ochsenbein; 24 November 1811 Schwarzenegg, Switzerland
- Died: 3 November 1890 (aged 78) Bellevue estate, Port, Switzerland
- Spouse: Emilie Sury (m. 1835)
- Children: 8
- Occupation: Jurist, military officer, politician

Johann Ulrich Ochsenbein, colloquially Ulrich Ochsenbein (24 November 1811 – 3 November 1890) was a Swiss jurist, military officer, politician who most notably served on the Federal Council (Switzerland) from 1848 to 1854. He previously also served on the National Council (Switzerland) briefly in 1848.

== Early life and education ==
Ochsenbein was born Johann Ulrich Ochsenbein on 24 November 1811 in the hamlet of Schwarzenegg in the Bernese Oberland, the second of ten children, to Caspar Ochsenbein, a innkeeper and horse dealer, and Magdalena Ochsenbein (née Gasser). His family was modestly affluent and relocated to Romandy in 1818 to Marnand in Vaud.

Ochsenbein is described of having been close to his mother. Until he was fourteen years of age, Ochsenbein attended French-speaking schools until he was aged 14 in Granges-près-Marnand and Moudon. In 1825, the Ochsenbein family relocated to the Bernese Seeland, where his father took another innkeeper position in Nidau. There he continued his education primarily speaking German, his mother tongue.

He attended the Gymnasium in Biel/Bienne completing his Maturity followed by law studies at the Academy in Bern. In 1830, Ochsenbein became a member of the Zofingia fraternity. After his parents died in 1830, respectively 1835, Ochsenbein inherited a lot of debt. Through the help of his siblings however he was able to financially rescue the inn of his parents. In December of 1834, Ochsenbein graduated and became a prosecutor and in 1841 an independent attorney (Fürsprecher).

== Professional and military career ==
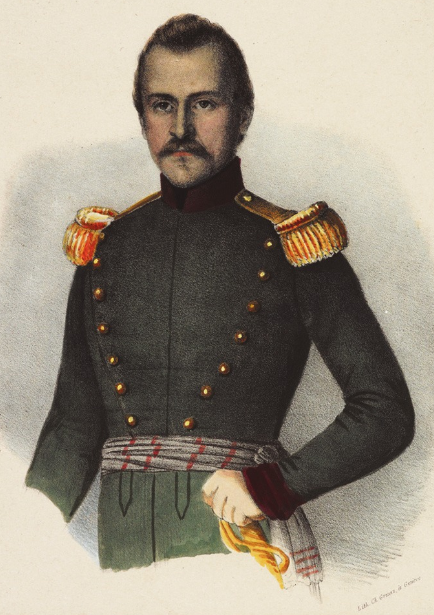
Ulrich Ochsenbein (1847)

From 1835 onwards, he had a law firm together with his brother-in-law Eduard Sury. His law firm was in Nidau, where he also entered the municipal council and served as its president. Between 1839 and 1841 he unsuccessfully represented Vingelz against the Abbey in St.Urban.

He served as a Feldwebel in the federal intervention in Basel Country in 1833 and was promoted to Unterleutntant in the artillery in 1834. In 1836 he became Lieutenant and was deployed to the Bernese Jura. Two years later, when France threatened a military intervention if Switzerland refused to extradite Louis Napoleon Bonaparte, he was deployed to the french border but Bonaparte eventually prevented a conflict by his voluntary departure from Swiss territory. Ulrich Ochsenbein was a leader of the unsuccessful second Freischarenzug against Lucerne in 1845. Over a hundred people died in the attack and 2000 prisoners were taken by Lucerne. Ochsenbein and Jakob Stämpfli only narrowly managed to escape. Since he was one of the leaders of the campaign against Lucerne, the Tagsatzung expelled him from the General Staff. Following the cantons of Lucerne, Zug, Valais, Schwyz, Fribourg, Uri and Unterwalden created the so-called Sonderbund. In 1847, he led a military force from Bern against the Sonderbund which then was also defeated in the Sonderbund war.

== Political career ==
Following the defeat in the Freischarenzüge, Ochsenbein was elected into the Grand Council of Bern from Nidau. He soon became Vice-President of the Executive Council and the second deputy for Bern to the Tagsatzung. As he entered the Tagsatzung for the first time in August 1846, still known as the former leader of the rebels, Colonel Theodor Ab Yberg (from the Sonderbund) fiercely opposed him.

He headed the Radicals of Bern (Berner Radikale) together with Jakob Stämpfli. The Radicals later became the Free Democratic Party (FDP). He was a member of the Grand Council in the canton of Bern from 1845 to 1846, president of the Verfassungsrat in 1846 and a member of the Regierungsrat from 1846 to 1848. 1847 to 1848 he represented the canton of Bern at the Tagsatzung (diet) which he presided in 1847. He played an important role that the Swiss constitution was accepted by the Swiss population in the constitutional referendum held on 6 June 1848.

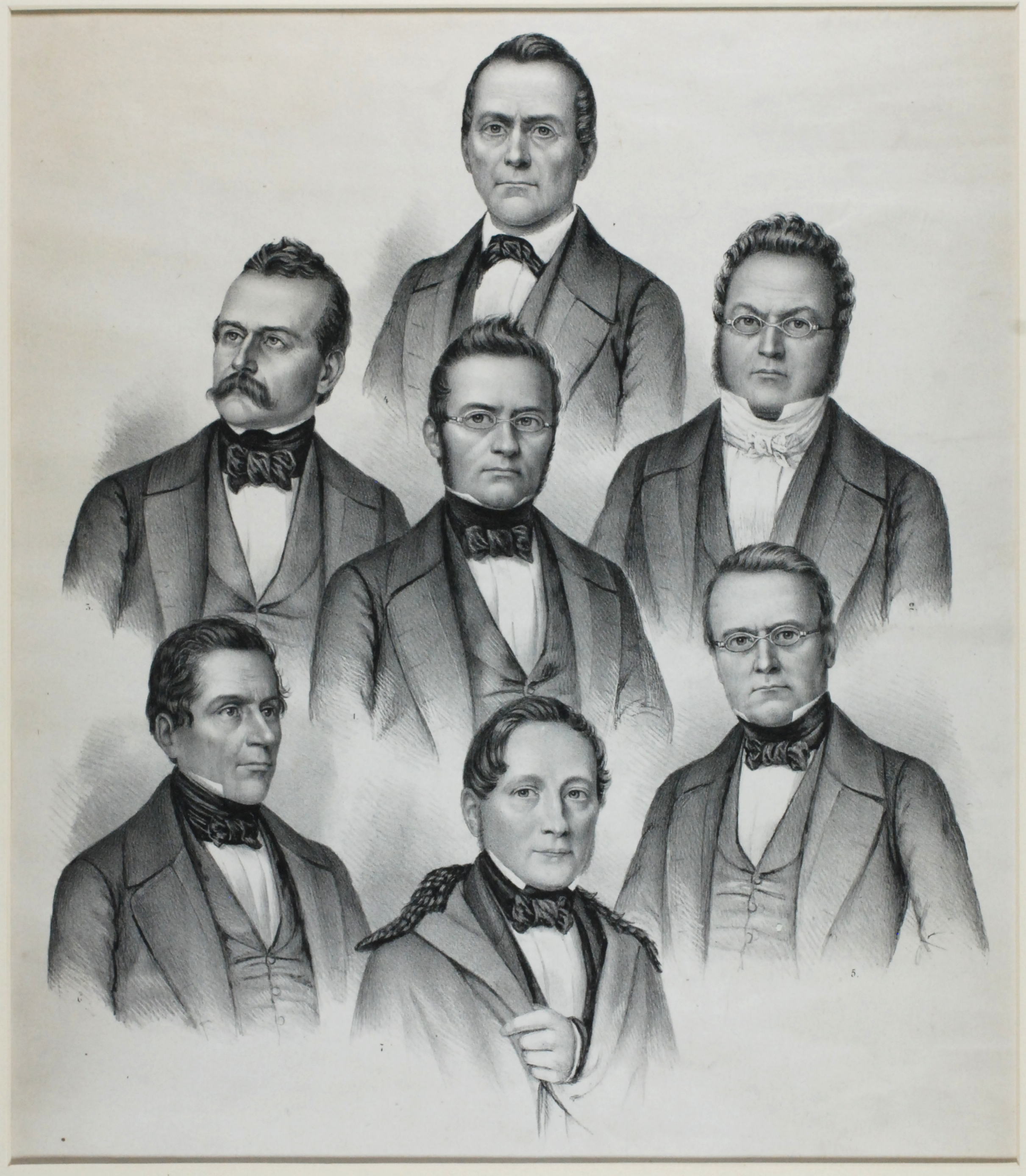
The first Federal Council of Switzerland, Ochsenbein with mustache on the left

He was elected to the Federal Council of Switzerland on 16 November 1848 as the second Federal Councilor after Jonas Furrer in the history of Switzerland. He handed over office on 31 December 1854. In the so-called Complementary Elections to the National Council in 1854, he had lost to Jakob Stämpfli, who then was preferred for the Federal Council by the National Council. He is one of only a few federal councilors to be voted out of office. During his time as a federal councilor a fight broke out between the conservatives and a group of the radical party. Not willing to take positions, he lost the trust of both sides. During his time in office he held the Military Department (department of defence).

== In France ==
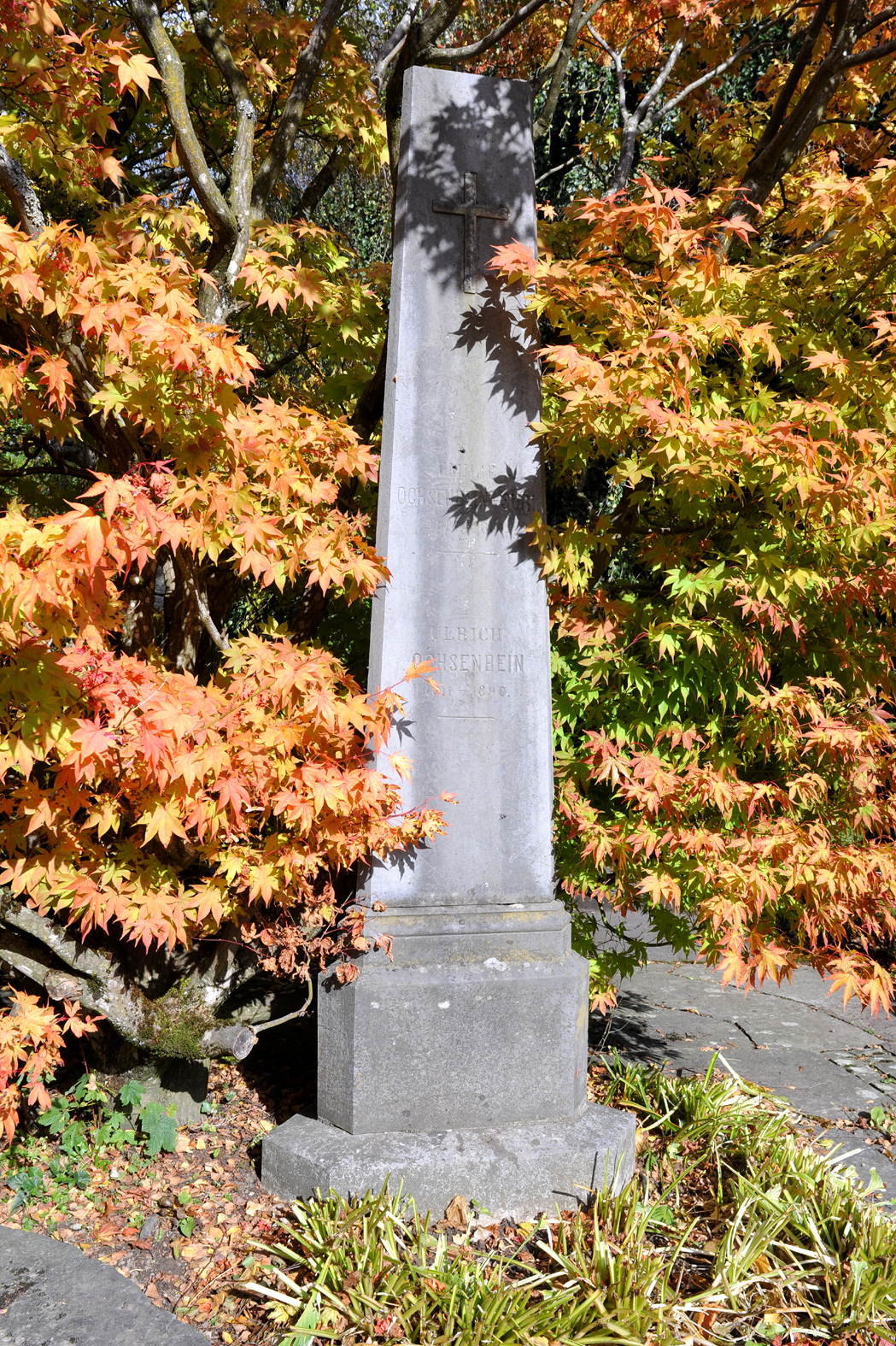
His tombstone in Nidau

After he resigned from politics in Switzerland, he first considered an emigration to America but then became a military officer in France where he served as a Brigadier General in the German-French war. That he served as a former head of the Military Department in Switzerland in the foreign services was also noted in Switzerland. He was for quite some while forgotten by the political elite and only in recent years and with a biography published in 2009, he was sort of rehabilitated.

== Personal life ==
In 1835, Ochsenbein married Emilie Margaritha Sury, daughter of Dr. Johann Sury, a physician from Kirchberg, Bern. They had eight children.

He returned to Nidau after his military service in France, and following opposed the educational politics of the Federal Councilor Karl Schenk or the Bernese railway politics which did not make him more popular. He died in Nidau in November 1890 aged 78.

Preceded by n/a (the first)	President of the Swiss National Council; 1848	Succeeded by Jakob Robert Steiger
Preceded by n/a one of the first seven	Member of the Swiss Federal Council; 1848–1854	Succeeded by Jakob Stämpfli
