= Henri Druey =

Swiss politician (1799–1855)

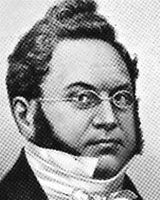
Henri Druey

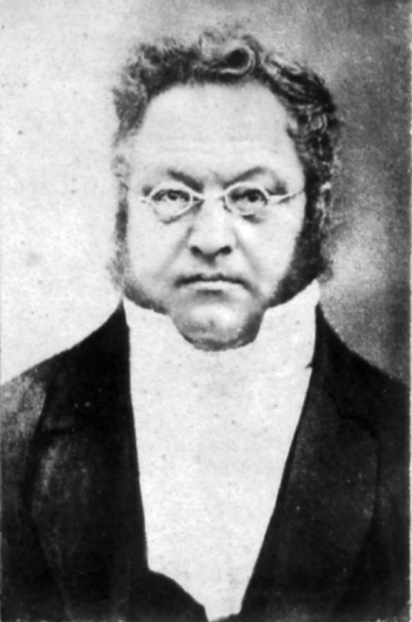
Photograph of Druey in later life in 1850

Daniel-Henri Druey (French pronunciation: [danjɛl ɑ̃ʁi dʁyɛ]; 12 April 1799 – 29 March 1855) was a Swiss politician of the 19th century. He was a founding father of constitutional democracy and member of the Free Democratic Party in Switzerland.

== Early life ==
Druey was born in Faoug, then in the Canton of Léman. After studying law at the academy in Lausanne he engaged in further study at Heidelberg, Paris and London.

== Political career in Switzerland ==
When Druey returned to Switzerland, aged 29, he was chosen to sit on the Canton of Vaud's Great Council. Two years later he became a member of the State Council.

Druey was elected to the Swiss Federal Council on 16 November 1848 as one of the seven initial members. During his time in office he held the following departments:

- Department of Justice and Police (1848–1849)
- Political Department (1850) as President of the Confederation
- Department of Finance (1851)
- Department of Justice and Police (1852)
- Department of Finance (1853–1855)

and was President of the Confederation in 1850.

Druey died in office on 29 March 1855.

Political offices
Preceded by n/a one of the first seven	Member of the Swiss Federal Council; 1848–1855	Succeeded by Constant Fornerod
Preceded by Jonas Furrer	President of the Swiss Confederation; 1850	Succeeded by Josef Munzinger
