= Friedrich Frey-Herosé =

Member of the Swiss Federal Council

Friedrich Frey-Herosé (12 October 1801, in Lindau – 22 September 1873) was a Swiss politician.

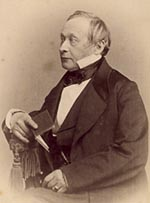
Friedrich Frey-Herosé

He was elected to the Swiss Federal Council on 16 November 1848 as one of the first seven members of the council. He was affiliated to the Free Democratic Party of Switzerland.

During his office time he held the following departments:

- Department of Trade and Customs (1848 - 1853)
- Political Department (1854)
- Military Department (1855 - 1859)
- Political Department (1860)
- Department of Trade and Customs (1861 - 1866)

and was President of the Confederation twice in 1854 and 1860.

He handed over office on 31 December 1866.

Political offices
Preceded by n/a one of the first seven	Member of the Swiss Federal Council; 1848–1866	Succeeded by Emil Welti
