= Stefano Franscini =

Swiss statistician and politician (1796–1857)

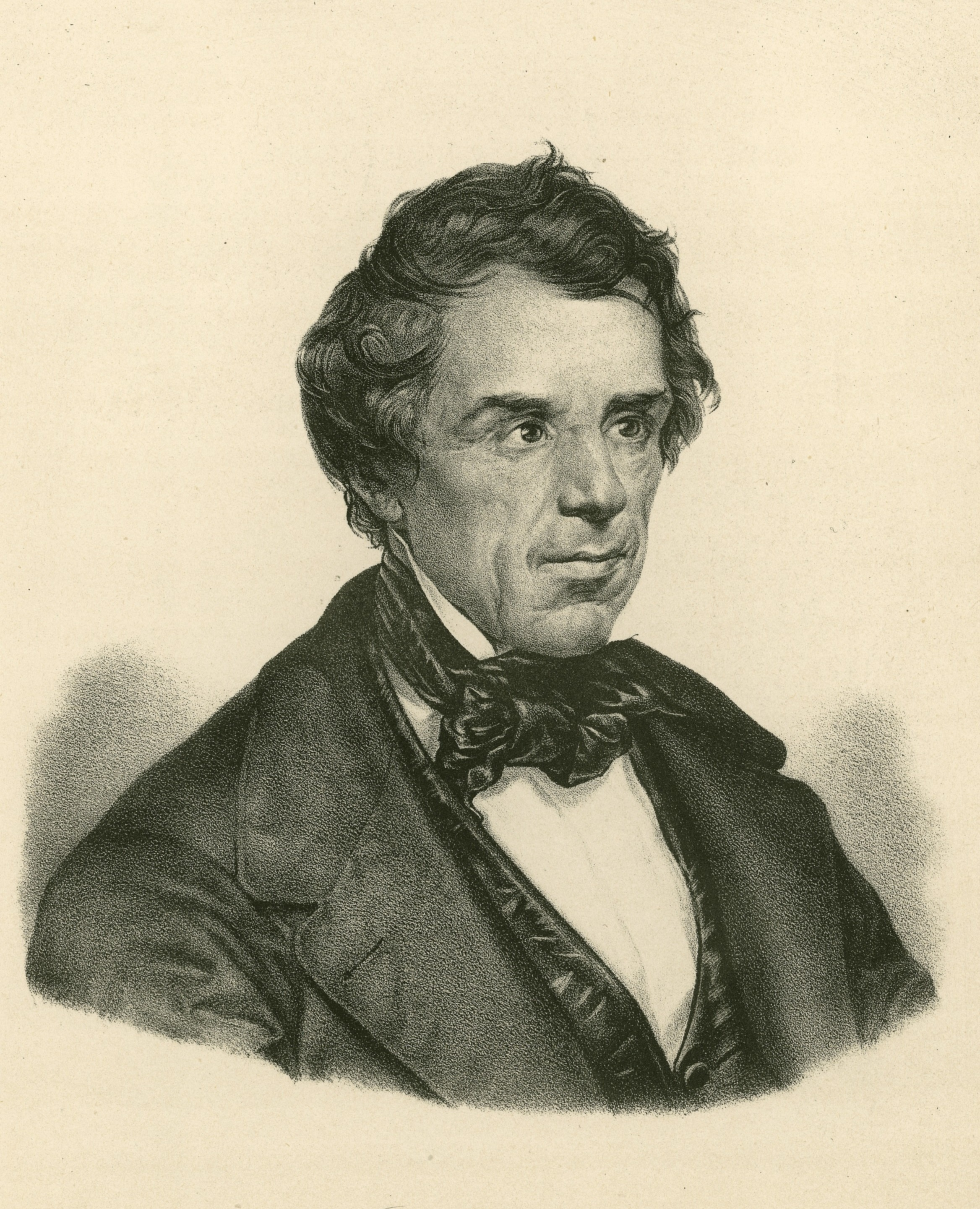
- Franscini c. 1840

Member of the Swiss Federal Council
- In office 1848–1857 Serving with Six others
- Preceded by: Office established
- Succeeded by: Giovanni Battista Pioda

Personal details
- Born: 23 October 1796 Bodio, Vogtei of Leventina, Swiss Confederacy
- Died: 19 July 1857 (aged 60) Bern, Switzerland

Stefano Franscini (23 October 1796 – 19 July 1857) was a Swiss politician and statistician. He was one of the initial members of the Swiss Federal Council elected in 1848 and Switzerland's first native Italian speaking federal councillor. Franscini was affiliated to the Liberal Radical Party of Switzerland. During his office tenure he held the Department of Home Affairs. Important elements of his political legacy include political reforms in the Ticino during the 1830s and 1840s, Switzerland's first federal population census in 1850, and the creation of the Swiss Federal Institute of Technology in 1854/1855.

== Early life and education (1796–1824) ==
Franscini was born in the village of Bodio, to a farmer's family with humble backgrounds. Until the age of eleven, he visited a winter school run by a priest in the neighbouring village Personico. From 1808 to 1814, he attended the priests' seminary in Pollegio, from where he was sent to continue his education and training at the archiepiscopal seminary for priests in Milan. In 1819, he abandoned his religious classes for the sake of studying history, law, political economics, and pedagogy, financing his studies by working as a teacher and author of textbooks. He became friends with Carlo Cattaneo, who was a member of the liberal Carboneria at the time, and who introduced Franscini to Milan's liberal political circles as well as to the works of political economist Melchiorre Gioia, sparking Franscini's lifelong interest in economical statistics. In 1823, he married Teresa Massari, with whom he had two children before she died in 1831.

== Political career (1824–1848) ==
Franscini returned to Bodio in 1824, where he continued his work as a teacher and author, also writing articles on history, economics, and statistics for the Gazzetta Ticinese. He and his wife founded a girls' school in Lugano based on the popular but controversial Bell-Lancaster method of mutual instruction. In 1827, Franscini published Switzerland's first comparative statistical analysis ever in Statistica della Svizzera ("Statistics of Switzerland"). The explicitly liberal text and interpretation were also translated to German, and helped build Franscini's reputation in the political scene. One year later, he wrote Della pubblica istruzione nel Cantone Ticino ("On public education in the canton of Ticino"), in which he strongly criticized the backwardness of the cantonal government's education policy. Another political text of his was published in Zürich in 1829, this time anonymously: Della riforma della Costituzione ticinese ("On the reform of the Ticino's constitution"), a call for reform, including an outline of how a liberal constitution should be drafted, and a strong criticism of the canton's restorative and conservative institutions. Franscini continued to write for liberal journals such as L'Osservatore del Ceresio and Il Repubblicano della Svizzera italiana and between 1837 and 1840 published La Svizzera italiana, a reform program for the canton of Ticino, based on a comprehensive statistical analysis of its political and economic condition.

His writings were not well received by the authoritarian cantonal government under Landamano Giovanni Battista Quadri , but his ideas were shared by a majority of the Ticino's legislative body, and they helped effectuate a constitutional reform and change of government. In the following years of reform, Franscini held several cantonal political offices: As a state secretary, from 1830 to 1837 and from 1845 to 1847, he prepared resolutions and laws for the cantonal government. He himself was an elected member of this government between 1837 and 1845, and again between 1847 and 1848. Franscini also represented the canton of Ticino at the Tagsatzung in 1841, 1843, 1845, and 1846. During his various tenures of office, Franscini was frequently sent on extraordinary missions, such as relief and calming missions in the Mendrisiotto during a cholera epidemic in 1836, and again during the famine of 1847. That same year he helped establish the armed defense in the Ticino to meet an unruly retreat of the Sonderbund's troops who were losing the War of the Sonderbund. On a national level, he attended intercantonal conferences on trade, customs, and postal services, and, in 1847, received a mandate to mitigate a peaceful change to liberal order in the Valais after its defeat in the War of the Sonderbund. The Tagsatzung also sent him on a fact-finding mission to Naples, where Swiss mercenaries had been accused of atrocious behavior while suppressing uprisings preceding the revolutions of 1848.

== Federal council and death (1848–1857) ==
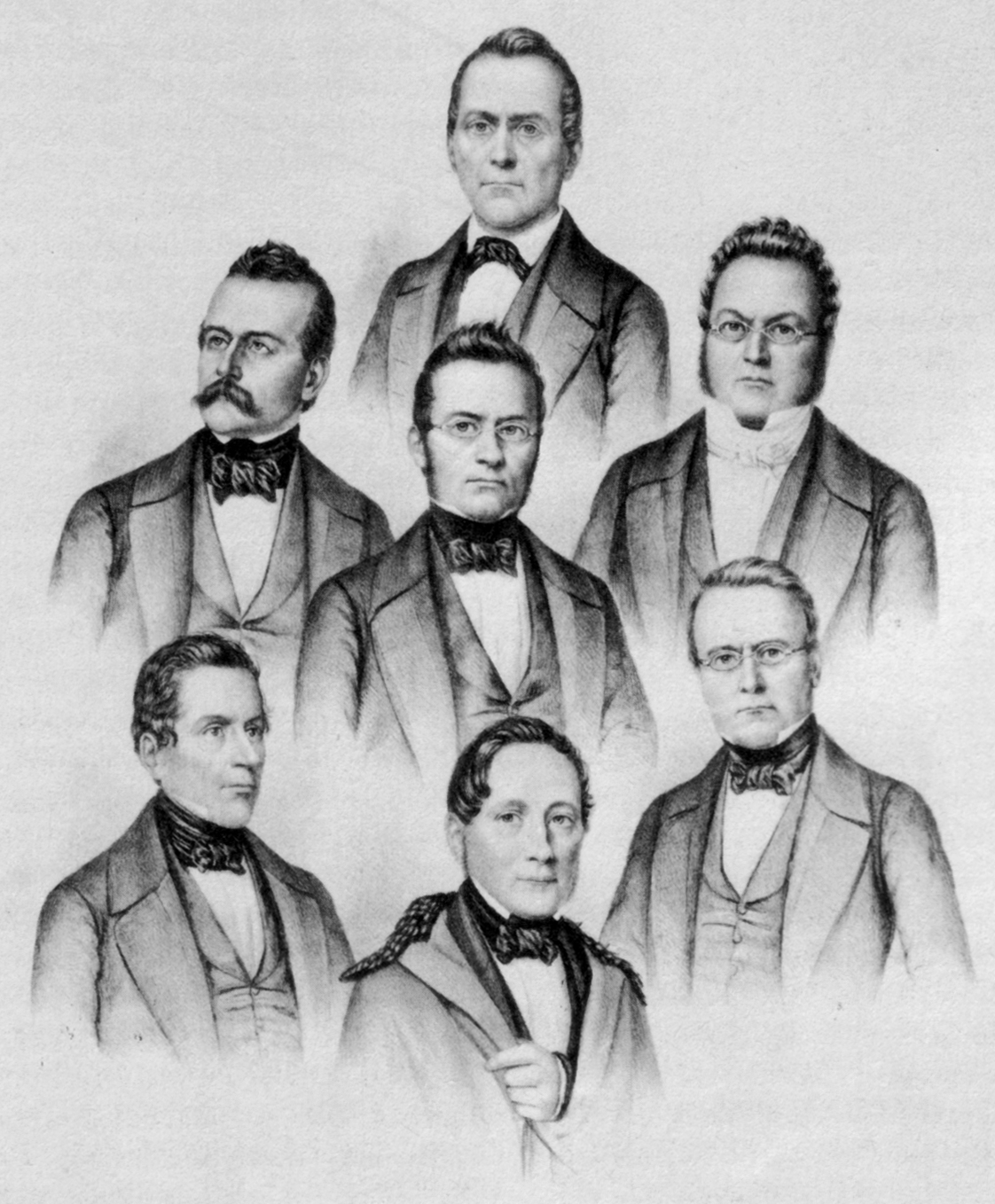
The first seven members of the Swiss Federal Council (1848). Stefano Franscini is portrayed in the bottom left corner.

Franscini was the fifth candidate proposed during the Swiss Federal Council's first election which was held by the newborn Federal Assembly on 16 November 1848. He was elected in the third round, receiving 68 out of 135 valid votes – only one vote above the required absolute majority and the weakest result among the first seven members of the Federal Council. For his entire tenure of eight years, Franscini supervised the Federal Department of Home Affairs. The constitution of 1848 granted the cantons far more autonomy than later revisions after 1874 would ever allow again, and the department's defined scope of responsibility was very small in comparison to what it would become later. Its primary focus was to organize the federal chancellory and federal archive. Other official duties included the collection of statistical data, supervision of religious rights and peace between confessions, sanitary measures in case of epidemic disease, and the standardization of weights and measurement.

One of the department's most important accomplishments under Franscini's supervision was the realization of a federal polytechnical institute. Franscini originally wished to create a national university, built on ideals of patriotic identity, but rivalries among cantons forced him to abandon this plan for the sake of a school of technology. The Eidgenössische Polytechnische Schule in Zürich held its first lectures in the autumn of 1855.

Franscini's was able to apply his interest in statistics to his work in 1850, when the distribution of seats in the National Council by canton needed to be calculated, and he was commissioned to organize Switzerland's first federal population census. Despite his strong belief in the value of collecting and evaluating statistical data – he saw it as one of a "socially progressive nation"'s duties – he wasn't able to convince federal or cantonal politicians of its importance. With the aid of a private secretary, he was forced to evaluate the data of the census all by himself after Parliament failed to provide the necessary funds. His evaluations were published in a series of five volumes between 1851 and 1858, titled Beiträge zur Statistik der schweizerischen Eidgenossenschaft ("Contributions to the Statistics of the Swiss Confederation"). The Federal Statistical Office was not introduced until 1860, after Franscini's death, along with a law on federal population censuses, which were to be held every ten years henceforth.

Though the federal council was always only elected by the Federal Assembly, there was an unwritten rule at the time, relinquished since the 1870s, that federal councillors should be confirmed in their home canton's election for the National Council as well. Franscini passed the test in 1851, but failed three years later, during the national elections of 1854, due to rivalries between the fractions of the Ticino's liberals. He was obliged to run in delayed elections held in the canton of Schaffhausen where he finally managed to obtain the desired percentage of votes. The official election for Federal Council held by the Federal Assembly in 1854 proved to be a struggle as well; Franscini did not receive the absolute majority of votes until the third round, and many members of the assembly had given their vote to his Ticinese friend Giovanni Battista Pioda.

Fatigued by the lack of appreciation for his hard work, and apprehensive of another political embarrassment during the upcoming national elections, Franscini decided to resign from office in 1857. He planned on working in the Ticino's cantonal archive, but died unexpectedly in Bern, while still in office, on 19 July 1857 aged 60. Eleven days later, Pioda was elected as his successor.

== Legacy ==
The minor planet 66939 Franscini, which was discovered on 28 November 1999 by Stefano Sposetti at the Gnosca Observatory, was named in Franscini's honor.

| Preceded by n/a one of the first seven | Member of the Swiss Federal Council; 1848–1857 | Succeeded by Giovanni Battista Pioda |
