= Wilhelm Matthias Naeff =

Swiss politician (1802-1881)

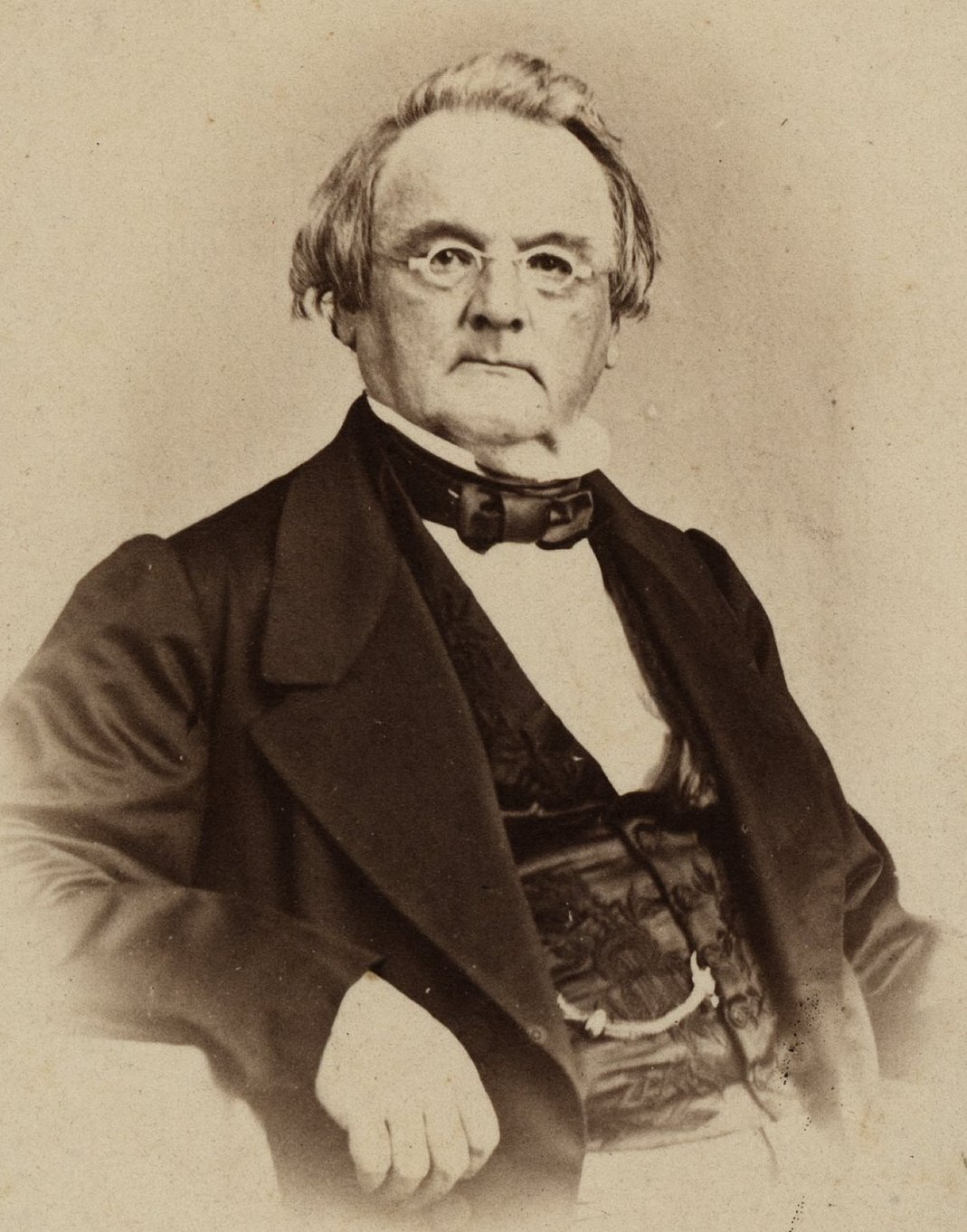
Wilhelm Matthias Naeff

Wilhelm Matthias Naeff (19 February 1802 – 21 January 1881) was a Swiss politician and one of the seven initial members of the Swiss Federal Council (1848–1875).

Naeff was born in Altstätten into a long-established Rhine-Valley's family. Already, his father was an influential merchant. Naeff studied law in Heidelberg (Germany), and, after his return to Switzerland, he was elected to the cantonal (state) government of St. Gallen. Naeff is well known for not intervening in the conflict, which dominated Switzerland at that time, between liberals and conservatives. The Rhine Valley was a stronghold of the liberals, which is why Naeff could depend on his supporters.

Naeff was a member of the "Siebnergruppe", a group of seven people who, after the Napoleonic occupation, drafted the 1848 constitution of the Swiss Confederation, the basis of the current constitution. He was elected to the Swiss Federal Council of ministers on 16 November 1848, as a representative of St. Gallen. He stayed there for 27 years, considerably longer than all of his counterparts from that time.

While, in his long term in office, Naeff increasingly lost influence and adhered a reputation as "deadhead". He was re-elected by only small margins. On 31 December 1875, he finally resigned. Naeff was affiliated with the Free Democratic Party of Switzerland (liberal democrats/radicals).

During his long tenure, he headed the following departments:

- Department of Posts and Construction (1848–1852)
- Political Department (1853)
- Department of Trade and Customs (1854)
- Department of Posts and Construction (1855–1859)
- Department of Posts (1860–1866)
- Department of Trade and Customs (1867–1872)
- Department of Railway and Trade (1873)
- Department of Finance (1873–1875)

In 1853, he was President of the Confederation, presiding the council. He resigned on 31 December 1875.

Political offices
Preceded by n/a one of the first seven	Member of the Swiss Federal Council; 1848–1875	Succeeded by Fridolin Anderwert
