= Josef Munzinger =

Swiss politician

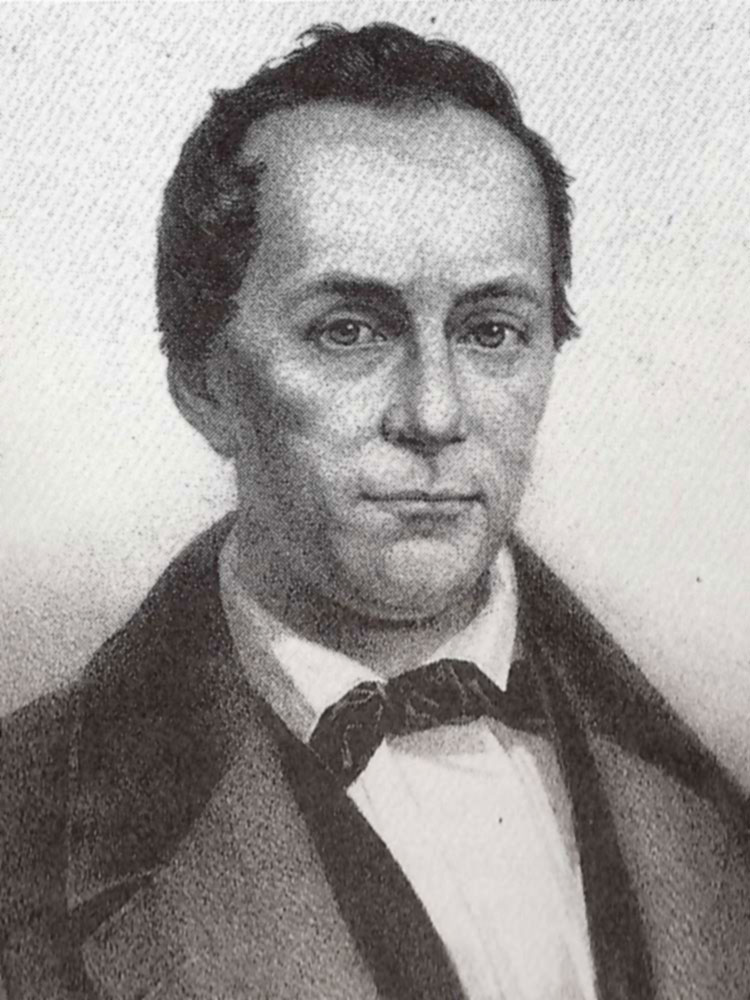
Josef Munzinger

Martin Josef Munzinger (11 November 1791 – 6 February 1855) was a Swiss politician.

He was elected to the Swiss Federal Council on 16 November 1848, as one of the first seven Councilors. While in office he held the following departments:

- Department of Finance (1848–1850)
- Political Department (1851)
- Department of Finance (1852)
- Department of Posts and Construction (1853–1854)
- Department of Trade and Customs (1855)

and was President of the Confederation in 1851.

Munzinger died in office on 6 February 1855.

Political offices
Preceded by n/a one of the first seven	Member of the Swiss Federal Council; 1848–1855	Succeeded by Melchior Josef Martin Knüsel
