= Federal Council (Switzerland) =

Seven-member collective cabinet

- Bundesrat (German); Conseil fédéral (French); Consiglio federale (Italian); Cussegl federal (Romansh)

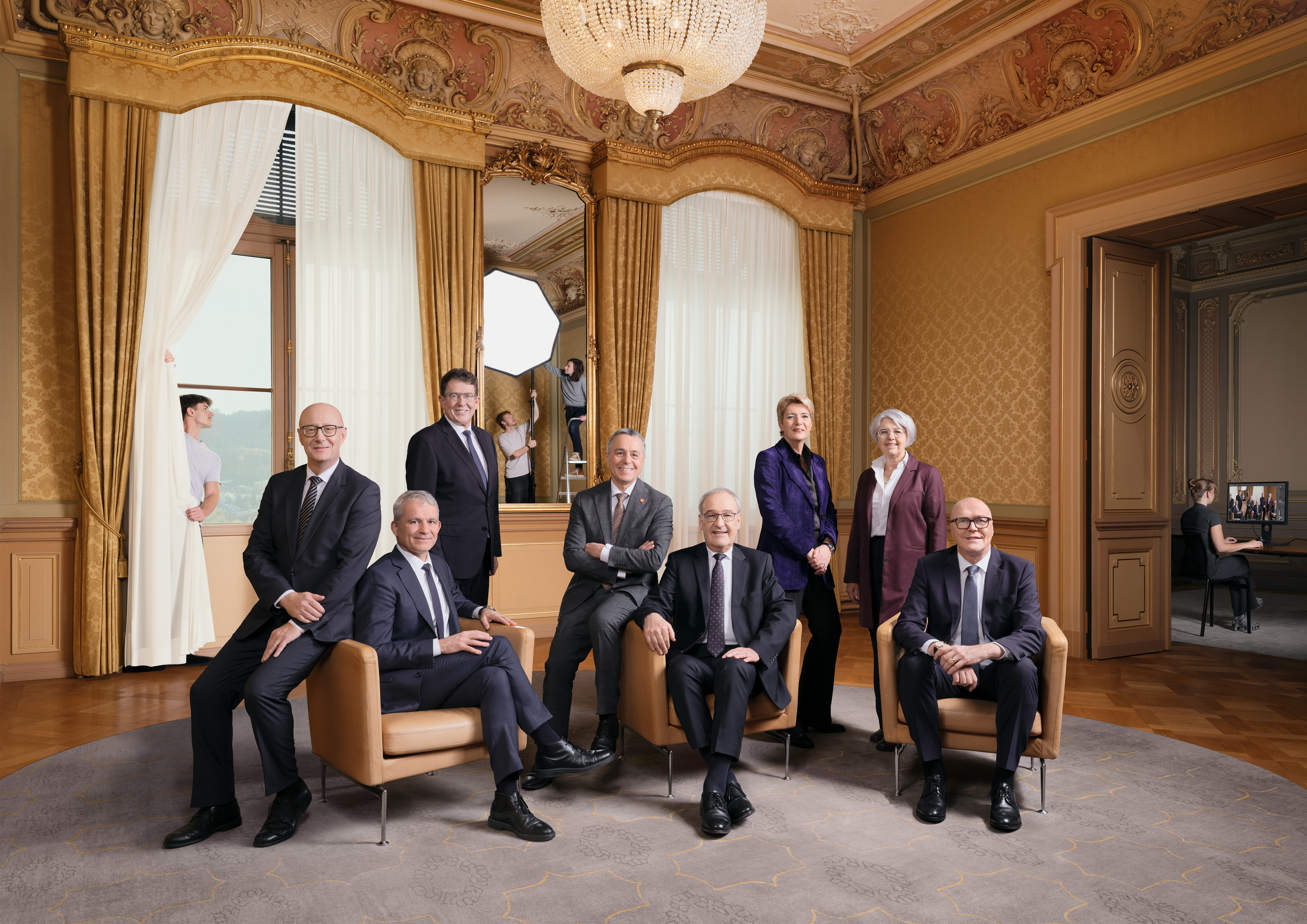
- The 2026 Federal Council (from left to right): Viktor Rossi (Chancellor); Beat Jans; Albert Rösti; Ignazio Cassis (Vice President); Guy Parmelin (President); Karin Keller-Sutter; Élisabeth Baume-Schneider; Martin Pfister
- Style: His/Her Excellency
- Status: Head of state; Head of government
- Appointer: Federal Assembly
- Term length: Four years; no term limits
- Constituting instrument: Constitution of Switzerland (2000)
- Inaugural holder: Ulrich Ochsenbein; Jonas Furrer; Martin J. Munzinger; Henri Druey; Friedrich Frey-Herosé; Wilhelm Matthias Naeff; Stefano Franscini
- Formation: 1848; 178 years ago
- Salary: SFr 478,166 annually (per Councillor)
- Website: Official website

The Federal Council (Note: German: Bundesrat, pronounced [ˈbʊndəsˌʁaːt]; French: Conseil fédéral, pronounced [kɔ̃sɛj fedeʁal]; Italian: Consiglio federale, pronounced [konˈsiʎʎo fedeˈraːle]; Romansh: Cussegl federal.) is the federal cabinet of the Swiss Confederation. Its seven members also serve as the collective head of state and government of Switzerland. Since World War II, the Federal Council is by convention a permanent grand coalition government composed of representatives of the country's major parties and language regions.

While the entire Federal Council is responsible for leading the federal administration of Switzerland, each Councillor heads one of the seven federal executive departments. The president of the Swiss Confederation chairs the council, but exercises no particular authority; rather, the position is one of a first among equals and rotates among the seven Councillors annually.

The Federal Council is elected as a body by the 246 members of the Federal Assembly of Switzerland for a term of four years after each federal parliamentary election, without the possibility of recall or a vote of no confidence. Incumbents are not term-limited and are by convention almost always re-elected; most serve around 8 to 12 years in office.

The chancellor of Switzerland serves as the general chief of staff of the Federal Council, and not as an eighth member.

== Members ==
As of 2026, the members of the Federal Council are, in order of seniority:

Name	Start	Party	Canton	Department
Guy Parmelin (President)	1 January 2016	Swiss People's Party	Vaud	Economic Affairs, Education and Research
Ignazio Cassis (Vice President)	1 November 2017	Liberals	Ticino	Foreign Affairs
Karin Keller-Sutter	1 January 2019	Liberals	St. Gallen	Finance
Albert Rösti	1 January 2023	Swiss People's Party	Bern	Environment, Transport, Energy and Communications
Élisabeth Baume-Schneider	1 January 2023	Social Democratic Party	Jura	Home Affairs
Beat Jans	1 January 2024	Social Democratic Party	Basel-City	Justice and Police
Martin Pfister	1 April 2025	Centre	Zug	Defence, Civil Protection and Sport

== Origins and history ==
=== Origins of the institution ===
The Federal Council was instituted by the 1848 Federal Constitution as the "supreme executive and directorial authority of the Confederation".

When the Constitution was written, constitutional democracy was still in its infancy, and the founding fathers of Switzerland had little in the way of examples. While they drew heavily on the United States Constitution for the organisation of the federal state as a whole, they opted for the collegial rather than the presidential system for the executive branch of government (directorial system). This accommodated the long tradition of the rule of collective bodies in Switzerland. Under the Ancien Régime, the cantons of the Old Swiss Confederacy had been governed by councils of pre-eminent citizens since time immemorial, and the later Helvetic Republic (with its equivalent Directorate) as well as the cantons that had given themselves liberal constitutions since the 1830s had also had good experiences with that mode of governance.

Today, only four other states, Bosnia and Herzegovina, Andorra, San Marino, and Nicaragua have collective rather than individual heads of state. However the collegial system of government has found widespread adoption in modern democracies in the form of cabinet government with collective responsibility.

=== Changes in composition ===
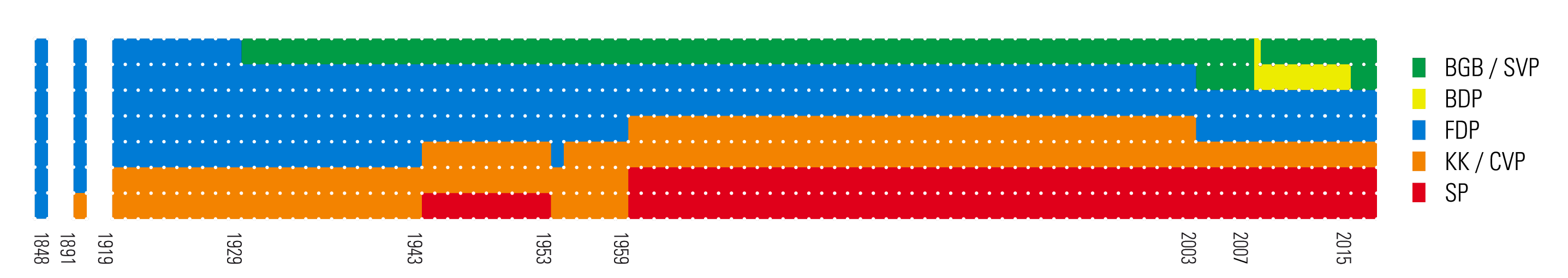
Composition of the Federal Council by political party, 1919 to 2017

The 1848 constitutional provision providing for the Federal Council – and indeed the institution of the Council itself – has remained unchanged to this day, even though Swiss society has changed profoundly since.

==== Party representation ====
===== Free Democratic hegemony, 1848–1891 =====
The 1848 Constitution was one of the few successes of the Europe-wide democratic revolutions of 1848. In Switzerland, the democratic movement was led – and the new federal state decisively shaped – by the Radicals (presently FDP. The Liberals). After winning the Sonderbund War (the Swiss civil war) against the Catholic cantons, the Radicals at first used their majority in the Federal Assembly to fill all the seats on the Federal Council. This made their former war opponents, the Catholic-Conservatives (presently the Christian Democratic People's Party, CVP), the opposition party. Only after Emil Welti's resignation in 1891 after a failed referendum on railway nationalisation did the Radicals decide to co-opt the Conservatives by supporting the election of Josef Zemp.

===== Emerging coalition government, 1891–1959 =====
The process of involving all major political movements of Switzerland into the responsibility of government continued during the first half of the 20th century. It was hastened by the FDP's and CVP's gradually diminishing voter shares, complemented by the rise of new parties of lesser power at the ends of the political spectrum. These were the Social Democratic Party (SP) on the Left and the Party of Farmers, Traders and Independents (BGB; presently the People's Party, SVP) on the Right. In due course, the CVP received its second seat in 1919 with Jean-Marie Musy, while the BGB joined the council in 1929 with Rudolf Minger. In 1943, during World War II, the Social Democrats were also temporarily included with Ernst Nobs.

===== Grand coalition, 1959–2003 =====
The 1959 elections, following the resignation of four councillors, finally established the Zauberformel, the "magical formula" that determined the council's composition during the rest of the 20th century and established the long-standing nature of the council as a permanent, voluntary grand coalition. In approximate relation to the parties' respective strength in the Federal Assembly, the seats were distributed as follows:

- Free Democratic Party (FDP/PRD): 2 members,
- Christian Democratic People's Party (CVP/PDC): 2 members,
- Social Democratic Party (SP/PS): 2 members,
- Swiss People's Party (SVP/UDC): 1 member.

During that time, the FDP/PRD and CVP/PDC very slowly but steadily kept losing voter share to the SVP/UDC and SP/PS, respectively, which overtook the older parties in popularity during the 1990s.

===== End of the grand coalition, 2008 =====
The governmental balance was changed after the 2003 elections, when the SVP/UDC was granted a council seat for their leader Christoph Blocher that had formerly belonged to the CVP/PDC's Ruth Metzler. Due to controversies surrounding his conduct in office, a narrow Assembly majority did not reelect Blocher in 2007 and chose instead Eveline Widmer-Schlumpf, a more moderate SVP/UDC politician, against party policy. This led to a split of the SVP/UDC in 2008. After liberal regional SVP/UDC groups including Federal Councillors Widmer-Schlumpf and Samuel Schmid founded a new Conservative Democratic Party, the SVP/UDC was left in opposition for the first time since 1929, but returned into the council with the election of Ueli Maurer on 10 December 2008, who regained the seat previously held by Schmid, who had resigned. The SVP/UDC regained its second seat on the Council in 2015, when Widmer-Schlumpf decided to resign after the SVP/UDC's large election gains in the 2015 election, being replaced by Guy Parmelin.

==== Women on the council ====
Women gained suffrage on the federal level in 1971. They remained unrepresented in the Federal Council for three further legislatures, until the 1984 election of Elisabeth Kopp. In 1983, the failed election of the first official female candidate, Lilian Uchtenhagen and again in 1993 the failed election of Christiane Brunner both SP/PS, was controversial and the Social Democrats each time considered withdrawing from the Council altogether.

There were two female councillors serving simultaneously for the first time in 1999, and three out of seven councillors were women from 2007 till 2010, when Simonetta Sommaruga was elected as the fourth woman in government in place of Moritz Leuenberger, putting men in minority for the first time in history. Also remarkable is the fact that the eighth non-voting member of government, the chancellor, who sets the government agenda, was also a woman.

In total, there have been ten female councillors in the period 1989 to present:

- The first woman councillor was Elisabeth Kopp (FDP/PRD), elected 1984, resigned in 1989.
- Ruth Dreifuss (SP/PS), served from 1993 to 2002, was the first woman to become President of the Confederation in 1999. Since her election there has always been at least one woman on the council.
- Ruth Metzler (Metzler-Arnold at the time) (CVP/PDC), served from 1999 to 2003 and was not re-elected to a second term (see above). Upon her election two women served on the council simultaneously for the first time.
- Micheline Calmy-Rey (SP/PS) was elected in 2003 and served until 2011.
- Doris Leuthard (CVP/PDC) was elected in 2006 and served until 2018.
- Eveline Widmer-Schlumpf was elected in December 2007 and served until December 2015.
- Simonetta Sommaruga was elected in September 2010. Together with Micheline Calmy-Rey, Doris Leuthard and Eveline Widmer-Schlumpf, women were in the majority in the Federal Council for the first time, until January 2012, when Alain Berset replaced Micheline Calmy-Rey.
- Karin Keller-Sutter and Viola Amherd were elected on 5 December 2018. Keller-Sutter is currently on the council, while Amherd served until 2025.
- Élisabeth Baume-Schneider was elected on 7 December 2022 and is the most recent woman to be elected to the council.

==== Regional balancing acts ====
Until 1999, the Constitution mandated that no canton could have multiple representatives on the Federal Council at the same time. For most of Swiss history, the canton of any given councillor was determined by their place of origin, but starting in 1987 this was changed to the canton from which they were elected (for former members of the Federal Assembly or cantonal legislative or executive bodies) or place of residence. Nothing prevented candidates from moving to politically expedient cantons; this was one of the motivators for abolishing the rule. At the 1999 Swiss referendums, the Constitution was changed to require an equitable distribution of seats among the cantons and language groups of the country, without setting concrete quotas.

Since the rule against Federal Councillors being from the same canton was abolished, there have been a few examples of it happening. The first time was from 2003 to 2007, when both Moritz Leuenberger and Christoph Blocher from the canton of Zurich were in office. It happened again between 2010 and 2018, starting when Simonetta Sommaruga and Johann Schneider-Ammann from the canton of Bern were elected in 2010. As of 2023, four cantons – Nidwalden, Schaffhausen, Schwyz, and Uri – have never been represented on the Federal Council. The canton of Jura is the most recent canton to be represented; since 1 January 2023, it has been represented by Elisabeth Baume-Schneider.

Whenever a member resigns, they are generally replaced by someone who is not only from the same party, but also the same language group. In 2006, however, Joseph Deiss, a French-speaker, resigned and was succeeded by Doris Leuthard, a German-speaker. In 2016, Eveline Widmer-Schlumpf, a German-speaker, was succeeded by Guy Parmelin, a French-speaker. Most recently, in 2023, German-speaking Simmonetta Sommaruga was replaced by French-speaking Elisabeth Baume-Schneider. Historically, at least two council seats have been held by French- or Italian-speakers. The language makeup of the council as of 2022 is four German-speakers, two French-speakers and one Italian-speaker. In November 2017, Ignazio Cassis became the first Italian speaker to serve on the council since 1999. For elections to the Federal Council, candidates are usually helped by a high degree of fluency in German, French, and Italian.

The constitutional requirement that languages and regions be appropriately balanced came under increased strain with the council's 2023 iteration. "Latin speakers" – people who either speak French, Italian, or Romansh – formed a majority on the council, despite more than sixty percent of the Swiss citizens speaking German as a first language. Likewise, at that time, no sitting Federal Councillors grew up in an urban area (with the exception of Karin Keller-Sutter, who spent some school years in Neuchâtel NE).

== Operation ==
=== Presidency ===
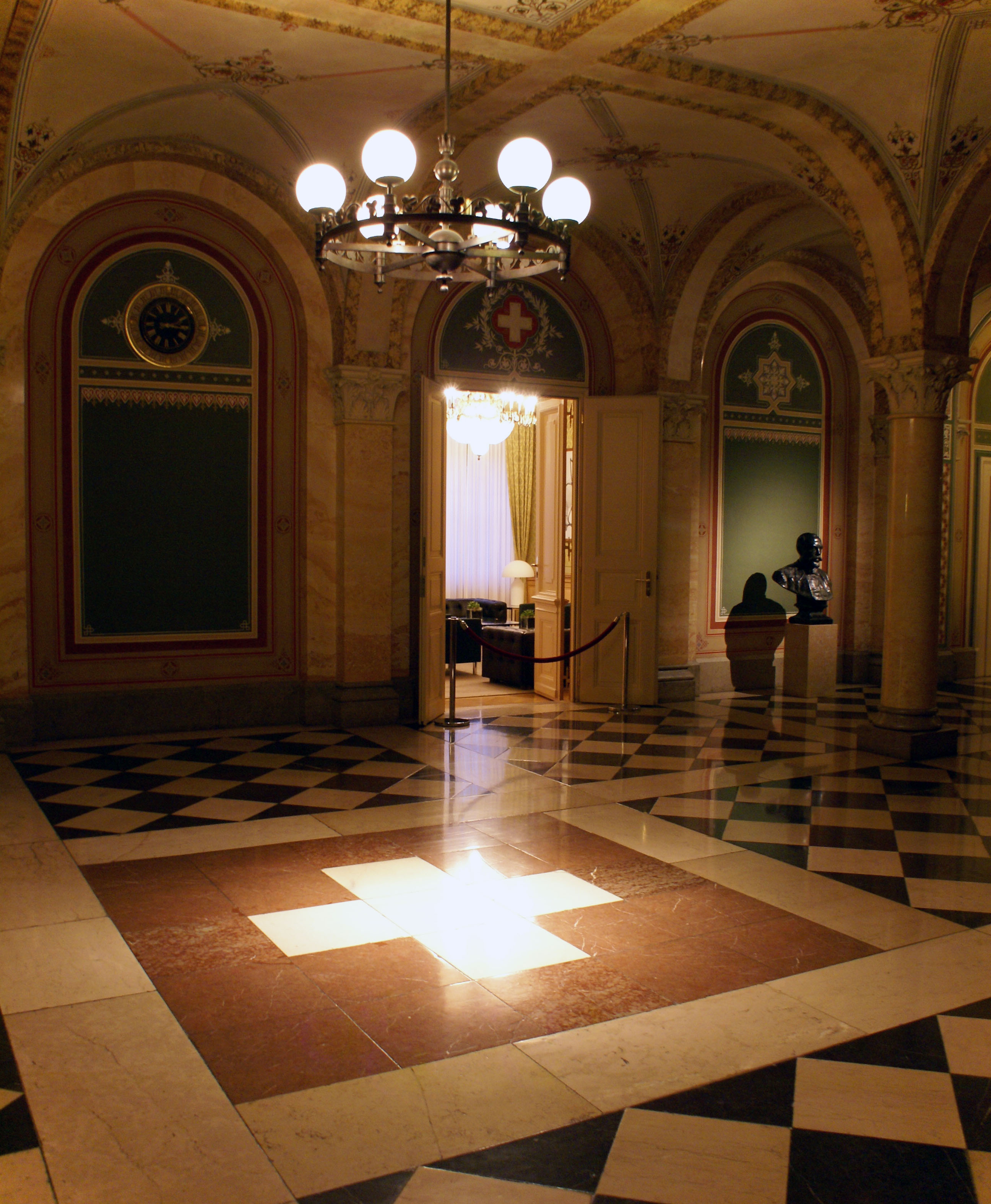
The interior of the west wing of the Federal Palace in Berne, where the Council meetings are held

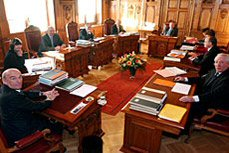
Meeting of the Federal Council in 2006

Each year, one of the seven councillors is elected by the United Federal Assembly as President of the Confederation. The Federal Assembly also elects a vice president of Switzerland. By convention, the positions of president and vice president rotate annually, each councillor thus becoming vice president and then president every seven years while in office.

According to the Swiss order of precedence, the president of the Confederation is the highest-ranking Swiss official. They preside over council meetings and carry out certain representative functions that, in other countries, are the business of a head of state. In urgent situations where a council decision cannot be made in time, they are empowered to act on behalf of the whole council. Apart from that, though, they are primus inter pares, having no power above and beyond the other six Councillors.

The president is not the Swiss head of state; this function is carried out by the council in corpore, that is, in its entirety. However, in recent practice the president acts and is recognised as head of state while conducting official visits abroad, as the Council (also by convention) does not leave the country in corpore. More often, though, official visits abroad are carried out by the head of the Federal Department of Foreign Affairs. Visiting heads of state are received by the Federal Council in corpore.

=== Council meetings ===
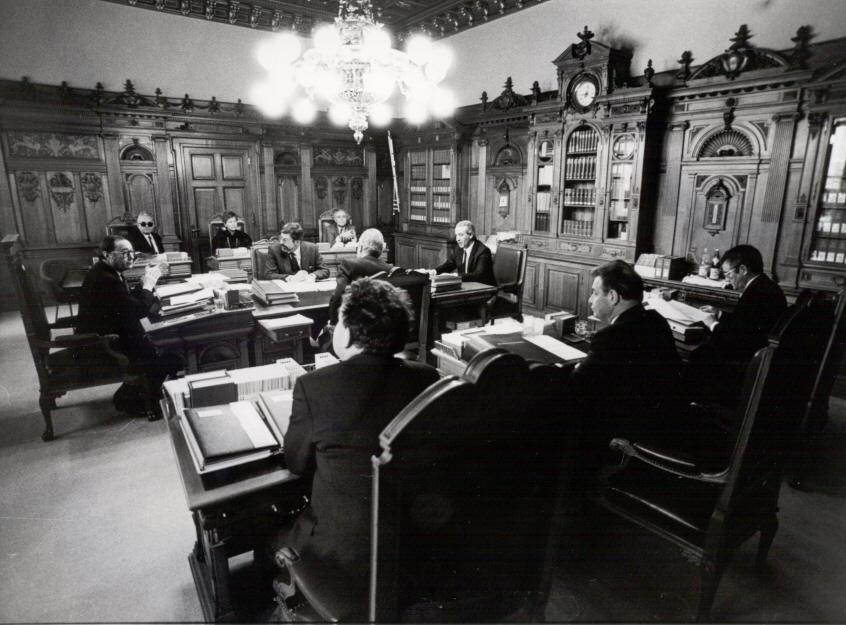
Before a meeting, 1987

The Federal Council operates mainly through weekly meetings, which are held each Wednesday at the Federal Palace in Bern, the seat of the Swiss federal government.

Apart from the seven Councillors, the following officials also attend the meetings:

- Federal Chancellor: Viktor Rossi. As government chief of staff and head of the Federal Chancellery, he participates in the discussion but has no vote in the council's decisions. Nonetheless, his influential position is often referred to as that of an "eighth Federal Councillor".
- the Vice-Chancellor: Rachel Salzmann is the spokesman of the Federal Council and conducts the weekly press briefing after the meeting.
- the Vice-Chancellor: Jörg De Bernardi who is in charge of the Federal Council sector within the Swiss Federal Chancellery.

During the meetings, the Councillors address each other formally (e.g. Mrs. Sommaruga, Mr. Berset), even though they are on first name terms with each other. This is done to separate the items on the agenda from the person promoting them.

After the meetings, the Councillors take lunch together. The council also meets regularly in conclave to discuss important topics at length; it annually conducts what is colloquially referred to as its "field trip", a day trip to some attractions in the President's home canton. In that and other respects, the council operates like a board of directors of a major corporation.

=== Decisions and responsibilities ===
Each Federal Councillor heads a government department, much like the ministers in the governments of other countries. Colloquially and by the press (especially outside Switzerland), they are often referred to as ministers even though no such post formally exists. For example, the head of the Federal Department of Defence, Civil Protection and Sports is often called "the Swiss defence minister", even though no such post officially exists. However, as council members, they are not only responsible for their own department, but also for the business of their colleagues' departments, as well as for the conduct of the government and the federal administration as a whole.

Decisions to be taken by the council are always prepared by the responsible department. Accordingly, a change in the salaries of federal employees would be proposed to the council by the head of the Federal Department of Finance, to whose department the Federal Office of Personnel belongs. Before a vote is taken at a council meeting, though, all proposals are circulated in writing to the heads of departments, who commission the senior career officials of their department – the heads of the Federal Offices – to prepare a written response to offer criticism and suggestions. This is called the co-report procedure (Mitberichtsverfahren/procédure de co-rapport), designed to build a wide consensus ahead of a council meeting.

To prepare for important decisions, an additional public consultation is sometimes conducted, to which the cantons, the political parties and major interest groups are invited, and in which all members of the public can participate. If a change in a federal statute is to be proposed to the Federal Assembly, this step is mandated by law. In such cases, the consultation procedure also serves to identify political concerns that could later be the focus of a popular referendum to stop passage of the bill at issue.

The decisions themselves are formally taken by voice vote by a majority of the Councillors present at a meeting. However, the great majority of decisions are arrived at by consensus; even though lately there is said to be a trend towards more contentious discussions and close votes.

=== Secrecy ===
The meetings of the Federal Council and the result of the votes taken are not open to the public, and the records remain sealed for 50 years. This has lately been the subject of some criticism. In particular, the parties at the ends of the political spectrum argue that this secrecy is contrary to the principle of transparency. However, the council has always maintained that secrecy is necessary to arrive at consensus and to preserve the collegiality and political independence of the individual Councillors.

=== Constitutional conventions ===
Due to the Federal Council's unique nature as a voluntary grand coalition of political opponents, its operation is subject to numerous constitutional conventions. Most notable is the principle of collegiality; that is, the Councillors are not supposed to publicly criticise one another, even though they are often political opponents. In effect, they are expected to publicly support all decisions of the council, even against their own personal opinion or that of their political party. In the eye of many observers, this convention has become rather strained after the 2003 elections (see below).

=== Travels abroad ===
Due to the fact that technically no sole federal councillor but rather the entire council in corpore is the Swiss head of state, Federal Councillors did for a long time not travel abroad in official business. In other countries, Switzerland was nearly exclusively represented by diplomats.

After the assassination of John F. Kennedy, the Federal Councillors convened an urgent meeting, where they discussed sending a Councillor to Kennedy's funeral. Given that the absence of the Swiss government would not be understood by the population, they decided to send Friedrich Traugott Wahlen. On his travel to the U.S. capital, Wahlen also met with Secretary of State Dean Rusk to discuss tariffs. Despite the opening of Switzerland due to the Kennedy assassination, foreign travels of Federal Councillors were only normalized after the dissolution of the USSR.

== Election and composition ==
The most recent federal council elections were held on 13 December 2023. Federal Council Alain Berset and Federal Chancellor Walter Turnherr had both announced that they would not be seeking reelection. The other Federal Councillors were all reelected, the FDP councillors seats were unsuccessfully attacked by the green party. The following councillors were reelected:

- Guy Parmelin (SVP/VD) since 2016, head of the Federal Department of Economic Affairs, Education and Research, elected with 215 out of 233 votes cast.
- Ignazio Cassis (FDP/TI) since 2017, head of the Federal Department of Foreign Affairs, elected with 167 out of 239 votes cast.
- Viola Amherd (DM/VS) since 2019, head of the Federal Department of Defence, Civil Protection and Sport, elected with 201 out of 228 votes cast.
- Karin Keller-Sutter (FDP/SG) since 2019, head of the Federal Department of Finance, elected with 176 out of 224 votes cast.
- Albert Rösti (SVP/BE) since 2023, head of the Federal Department of Environment, Transport, Energy and Communications, elected with 189 out of 217 votes cast.
- Élisabeth Baume-Schneider (SP/JU) since 2023, head of the Federal Department of Justice and Police, elected with 151 out of 216 votes cast.

Following the resignation of Alain Berset as of 31 December 2023, replacement elections were held:

- Beat Jans (SP/BS), elected in the third round of voting with 134 out of 245 votes cast.

In addition, Viktor Rossi (GLP) was newly elected as Federal Chancellor with 135 out of 245 votes cast in the second round of voting. Additionally Viola Amherd was elected President of the Swiss Confederation for the year 2024 and Karin Keller-Sutter was elected vice president of the Federal Council for the year 2024. Following the elections there was a departmental reshuffle. Élisabeth Baume-Schneider took over the Federal Department of Home Affairs vacated by Alain Berset and newly elected Beat Jans took over Baume-Schneiders Justice and Police Department.

=== Election process ===
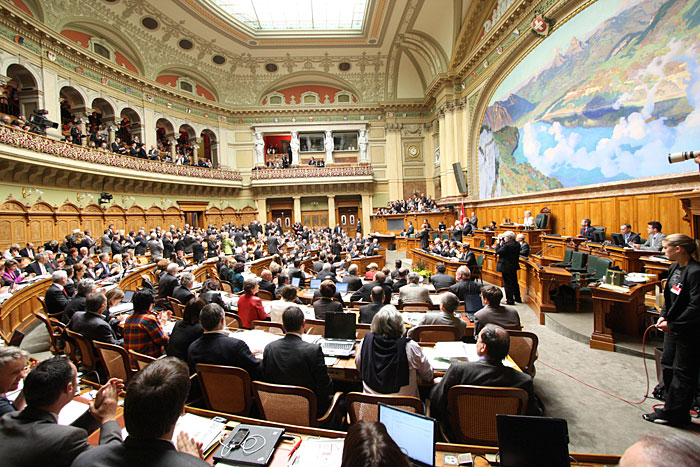
2006 election of the Federal Council in the Federal Assembly

The members of the Federal Council are elected for a term of four years by both chambers of the Federal Assembly sitting together as the United Federal Assembly. Each Federal Council seat is up for (re-)election in the order of seniority, beginning with the Councillor who had the longest term of office. The office holders are then elected individually by secret ballot by an absolute majority of the valid votes. Every adult Swiss citizen is eligible (and could even be elected against their own will), but in practice, only members of Parliament or more rarely, members of cantonal governments, are nominated by the political parties and receive a substantial number of votes. The voting is conducted in several rounds, under a form of exhaustive ballot.

- In the two first rounds, any adult Swiss citizen with voting right is eligible.
- At the issue of the second round, anyone who has received at least ten votes is eligible for the third round.
- At the issue of the third and later rounds (if necessary), the candidates with fewer than ten votes are excluded, or the candidate with the lowest vote count is excluded. No such exclusion takes place when two or more candidates share a lowest vote count at least equalling 10.

After the election is concluded, the winner gives a short speech and accepts or refuses the office of Federal Councillor. The oath of office is then taken, even though the regular term of office only begins a few weeks later, on 1 January.

Usually, the party which has a seat to fill presents two candidates with mainstream viewpoints to the United Federal Assembly, which then chooses one. This was not so, however, during the 2003 election, which was the most controversial in recent memory. Until the end of the 19th century, it was informally required of Federal Councillors to be elected to the National Council in their canton of origin every four years to put their popularity to a test. This practice was known under the French term of élection de compliment. The first Councillor who failed to be reelected (Ulrich Ochsenbein) lost his election to the National Council in 1854.

Once elected, Councillors remain members of their political parties, but hold no leading office with them. In fact, they usually maintain a certain political distance from the party leadership, because under the rules of collegiality, they will often have to publicly promote a council decision which does not match the political conviction of their party (or of themselves).

=== Resignation ===
Once elected for a four-year-term, Federal Councillors can neither be voted out of office by a motion of no confidence nor can they be impeached. Reelection is possible for an indefinite number of terms; it has historically been extremely rare for Parliament not to reelect a sitting Councillor. This has only happened four times – to Ulrich Ochsenbein in 1854, to Jean-Jacques Challet-Venel in 1872, to Ruth Metzler in 2003 and to Christoph Blocher in 2007. In practice, therefore, Councillors serve until they decide to resign and retire to private life, usually after three to five terms of office.

== Status of Federal Councillors ==
=== Councillors' lives ===
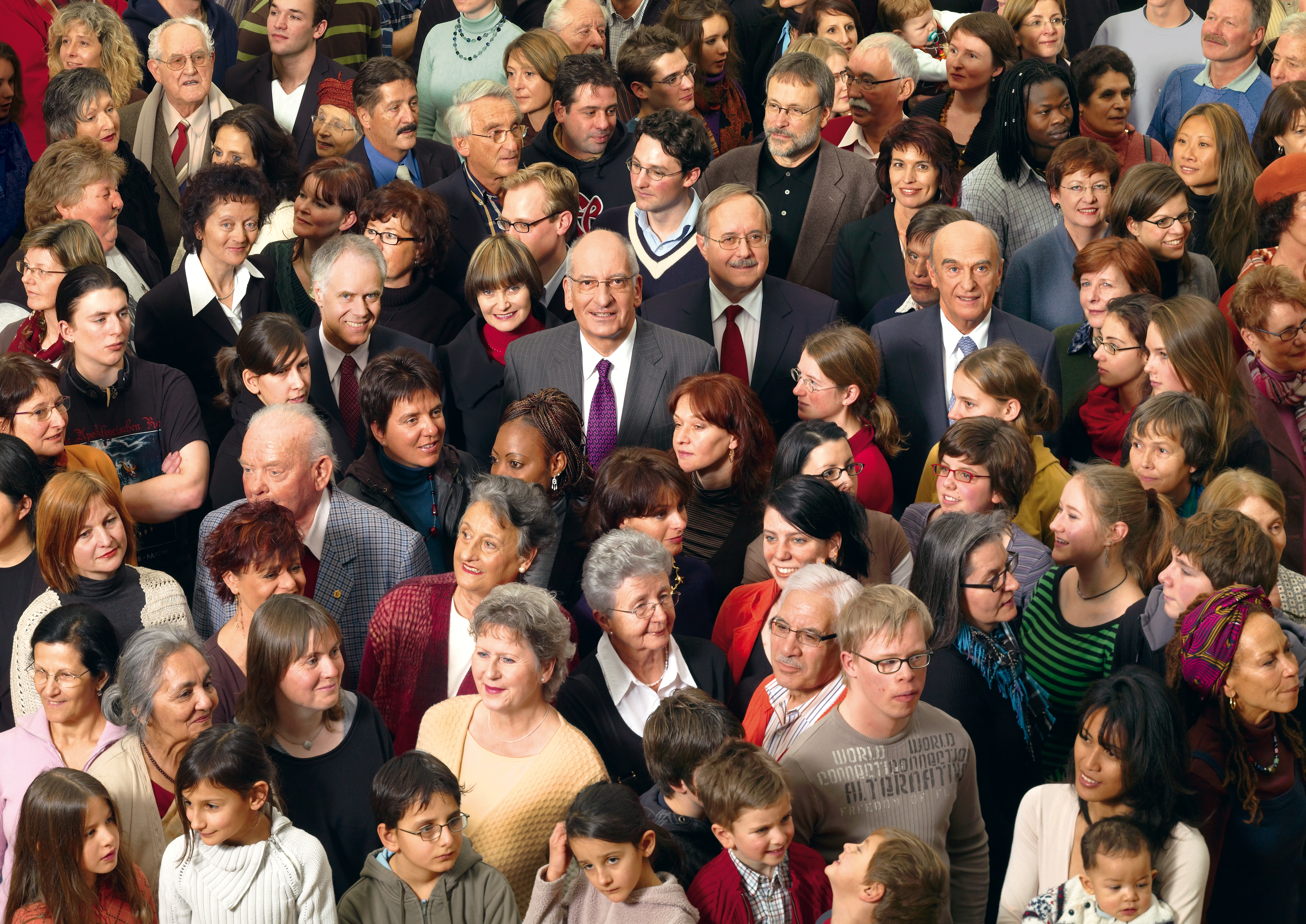
Faces in the Crowd: In keeping with the spirit of Swiss direct democracy, the 2008 official photograph of the Federal Council depicted them as everymen.

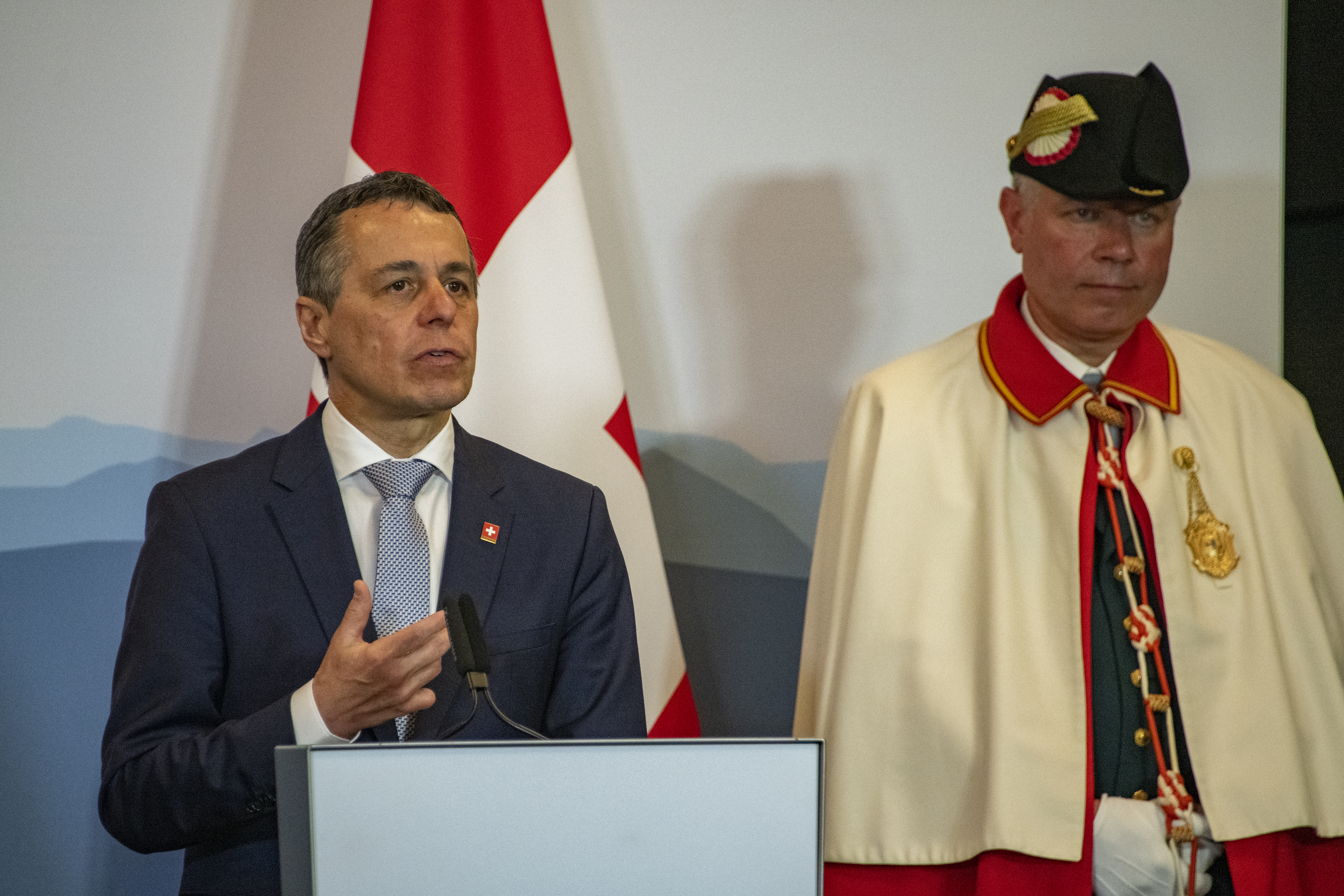
Federal Councillor Ignazio Cassis speaks in 2019 accompanied by a Bundesweibel

Unlike most senior members of government in other countries, the Federal Councillors are not entitled to an official residence. However, the Federal Palace houses living apartments for both the Federal Chancellor and President of the Confederation. Mostly, Federal Councillors have chosen to rent apartments or hotel suites in Bern at their own expense. However, they are entitled to use the Federal Council's country estate, Lohn, for holidays, and this estate is also used to host official guests of the Swiss Confederation.

While Councillors can draw on an Army security detail if they need personal protection, in particular during official events, they are often encountered without any escort in the streets, restaurants and tramways of Bern. Ueli Maurer was known to use the bicycle on most days from his apartment in Münsingen to the Federal Palace in Bern. Councillors are also entitled to a personal bailiff (huissier or Bundesweibel) who accompanies them, in a red and white ceremonial uniform, to official events.

The spouses of Councillors do not play an official part in the business of government, apart from accompanying the Councillors to official receptions.

=== Councillors' salary ===
Federal councillors receive an annual salary of CHF 477,688. The councillors pay tax on this income. They also receive an annual expense allowance of CHF 30,000 and their telecommunication costs are covered, except for their TV and radio licence fee themselves. For travel they are entitled to an official state car and a company car, with private usage being billed at 0.9% of the car's purchase price per month. They also have the right to a first-class annual rail pass and access to government-owned aircraft.

Former councillors with at least four years of service receive a pension equivalent to half the salary of Federal Council members in office. If a councillor leaves office for health reasons, they may receive this pension even if their length of service was less than three years. Councillors who leave their offices after less than four years may also receive a partial pension. After leaving office, "former federal councillors frequently pursue some other lucrative activity," but "their earnings, when added to the pension they receive as an ex-federal councillor, may not exceed the salary of a federal councillor in office, otherwise their pension is reduced accordingly."

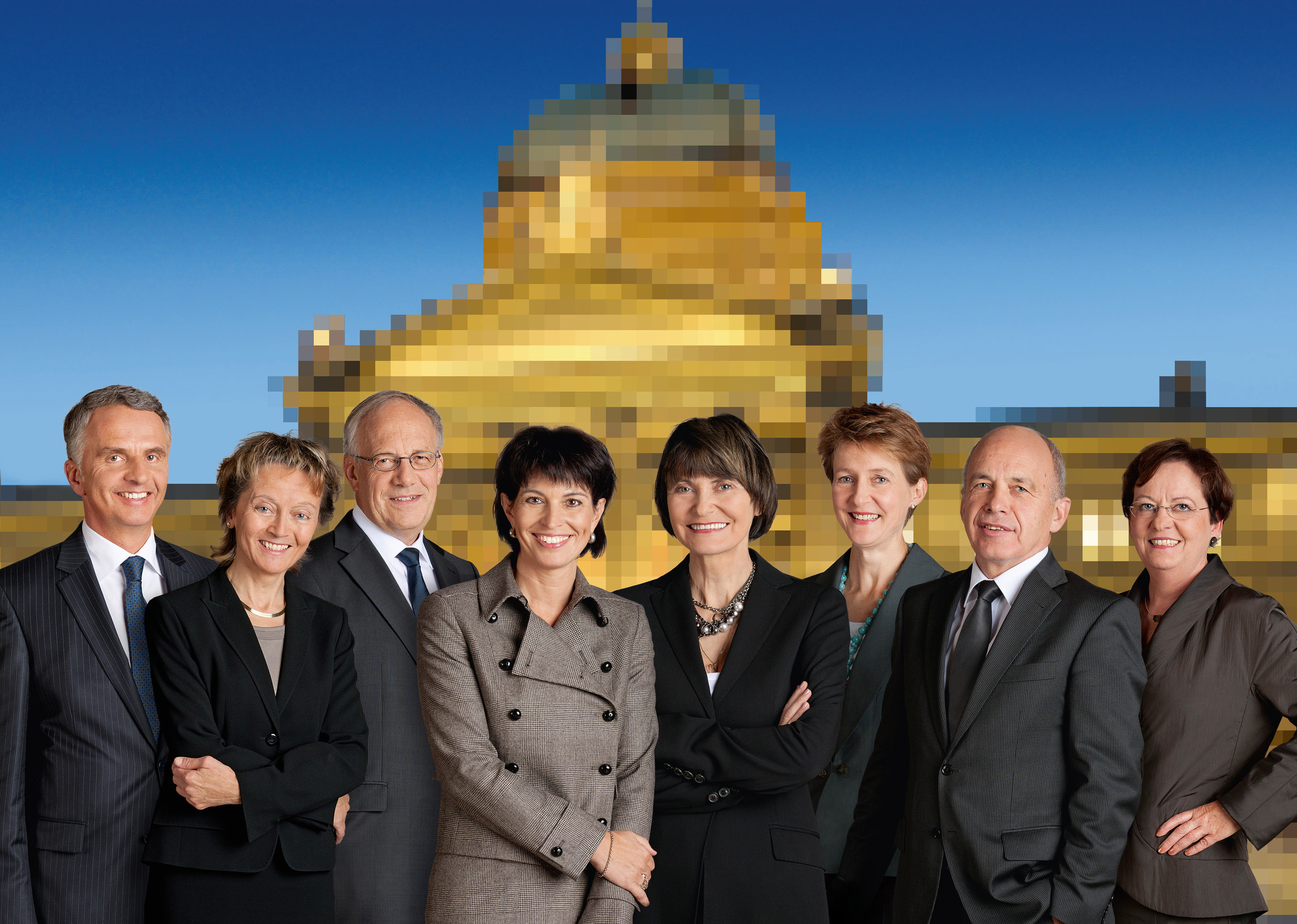
First Federal Council with a majority of women (2010)

=== Immunity ===
Federal Councillors, like members of parliament, enjoy absolute legal immunity for all statements made in their official capacity.

Prosecution for crimes and misdemeanors that relate to the Councillors' official capacity requires the assent of the immunity commissions of the Federal Assembly. In such cases, Parliament can also suspend the Councillor in office (but not actually remove them).

According to statements to the media by a Federal Chancellory official, in none of the few cases of accusations against a Federal Councillor has the permission to prosecute ever been granted. Such cases usually involved statements considered offensive by members of the public. However, one unnamed Councillor involved in a traffic accident immediately prior to his date of resignation was reported to have voluntarily waived his immunity, and Councillor Elisabeth Kopp decided to resign upon facing an inquiry over allegations of secrecy violations.

== List of firsts ==
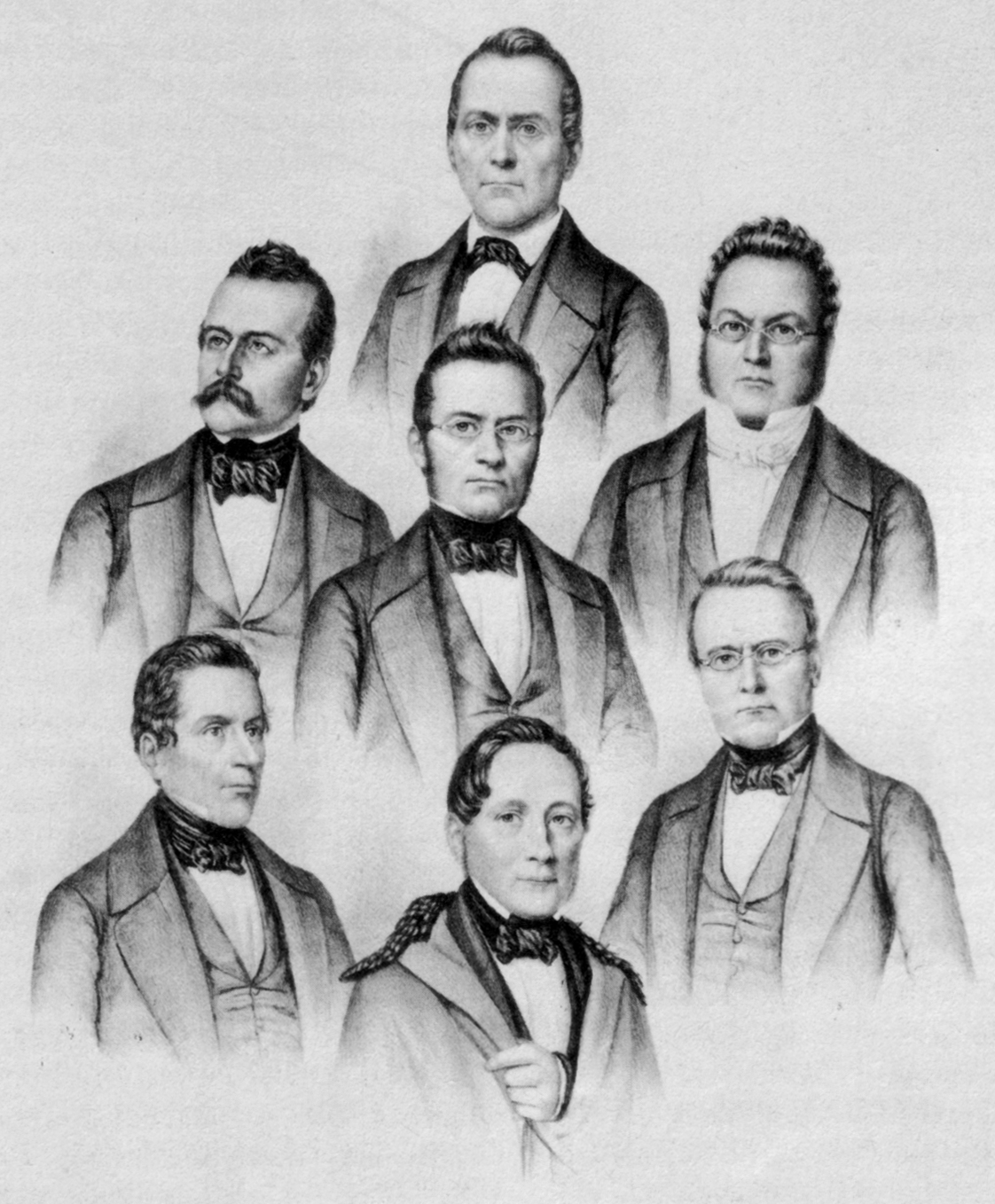
The first seven members, elected 1848

- 1848: The first seven members elected: Ulrich Ochsenbein, Jonas Furrer, Martin J. Munzinger, Henri Druey, Friedrich Frey-Herosé, Wilhelm Matthias Naeff and Stefano Franscini.
- 1854: First (of only four so far) sitting Federal Councillor not to be reelected, Ulrich Ochsenbein.
- 1855: The first elected Councillor to refuse the office, Johann Jakob Stehlin.
- 1875: Louis Ruchonnet wins the election, but refuses the office. In a repeated election, Charles Estoppey wins, but refuses too. In a third election, Numa Droz is elected and accepts the office. He still is the youngest person to have ever served on the Federal Council.
- 1891: First Councillor of the Christian Democratic People's Party of Switzerland, Josef Zemp.
- 1893: First member whose father was a member of the Council: Eugène Ruffy, son of Victor Ruffy. In 2007, the second is elected: Eveline Widmer-Schlumpf, the daughter of Leon Schlumpf.
- 1911: First (and only) octogenarian in office, Adolf Deucher (FDP).
- 1913: First (and only) native Romansh speaker, Felix Calonder (FDP).
- 1917: First (and only) Councillor of the Liberal Party elected, Gustave Ador.
- 1917–1919: First majority of Romance-speaking Councillors, making German speakers a minority: Gustave Ador, Giuseppe Motta, Camille Decoppet and Felix-Louis Calonder. This would happen again more than hundred years later, in 2023.
- 1930: First councillor of the Party of Farmers, Traders and Independents (BGB/PAI; now the Swiss People's Party), Rudolf Minger.
- 1943: First councillor of the Social Democratic Party (SP), Ernst Nobs.
- 1973: First councillor of the working class, Willi Ritschard of the SP. He was trained as a heating engineer; his father was a shoemaker.
- 1983: First female candidate for the council from a government party, Lilian Uchtenhagen (SP).
- 1984: First woman Councillor, Elisabeth Kopp (FDP).
- 1993: Ruth Dreifuss (SP) is elected, the first Jewish Councillor.
- 1995: First Councillor living in a domestic partnership, Moritz Leuenberger (SP) (with architect Gret Loewensberg, whom he later married).
- 1999: First woman President of the Confederation, Ruth Dreifuss (SP).
- 2010: First majority of women in the Swiss Federal Council with the election of Simonetta Sommaruga (SP).
- 2019: After 1900, the overwhelming majority of the Federal Councillors had an academic education. From January 2019 until December 2022, non-academics featured a majority: Ueli Maurer (salesman/accountant), Guy Parmelin (high school diploma, farmer), Simonetta Sommaruga (high school diploma, concert pianist) and Karin Keller-Sutter (trade school, translator).

== Popularity and trust ==
As of August 2022, half of the Swiss population was satisfied with the Federal Council.

== Controversies ==
Information provided by the Federal Council during public votes is sometimes "biased, or misleading", according to a 2026-report by the Swiss Federal Audit Office.

The requirement for priests and monks to serve in the army since June 2026, has offended Swiss churches who are denouncing the fact that the Federal Council did not consult them before revising the law, as is customary for any legislative change in Switzerland. According to the government, pastoral ministry is reportedly no longer even considered "an activity essential to the maintenance of social life." Later, however, Swiss Federal Councilor, Martin Pfister, presented his excuses but did not amend the government’s decision.

== See also ==
- Composition of the Swiss Federal Council
- Federal act (Switzerland)
- Government and Administration Organisation Act (Switzerland)
- Hotel Bellevue Palace
- List of members of the Swiss Federal Council (by date of election)
- List of members of the Swiss Federal Council by date (by first day in office)
- List of presidents of the Swiss Confederation
- To serve and disappear

== Bibliography ==
- "Federal Council" in German, French and Italian in the online Historical Dictionary of Switzerland.
- The Swiss Confederation: A brief guide 2006–2009, edited by the Swiss Federal Chancellery.
- Resultate der Wahlen des Bundesrats, der Bundeskanzler und des Generals, compiled by the services of the Swiss Parliament.
- Altermatt, Urs (1993). Conseil Fédéral: Dictionnaire biographique des cent premiers conseillers fédéraux. Cabédita, Yens. ISBN 2-88295-104-3.
- Clive H. Church (2004). The Politics and Government of Switzerland. Palgrave Macmillan. ISBN 0-333-69277-2.
