= 2022 in Switzerland =

- Decades: 2000s; 2010s; 2020s
- See also: History of Switzerland; Timeline of Swiss history; List of years in Switzerland

Events in the year 2022 in Switzerland.

== Incumbents ==
- President of the Swiss Confederation: Ignazio Cassis
- President of the National Council: Irène Kälin
- President of the Swiss Council of States: Thomas Hefti

== Events ==
Ongoing — COVID-19 pandemic in Switzerland

=== January ===
- Ignazio Cassis of the Free Democratic Party (FDP) assumes the presidency, succeeding Guy Parmelin of the Swiss People’s Party (SVP).

=== April ===
- 26 April – The House of Switzerland is hosted at Milan's Casa degli Artisti, showcasing Swiss innovation, design, and culture in the Brera district.

=== June ===
- 2-3 June – The Swiss Economic Forum is held in Interlaken, featuring around 1,350 CEOs and leading Swiss entrepreneurs.
- 29-30 June – The One Young World Switzerland Caucus is held in Uzwil, focusing on business, sustainability, and social impact.

=== August ===
- 3 August – The 75th Locarno Film Festival opens in Locarno with Bullet Train by David Leitch.
- 26 August – The Athletissima is held in Lausanne at Stade Olympique de la Pontaise as part of the 2022 Diamond League; Noah Lyles wins the men’s 200m with a time of 19.56 seconds.
- The Federal Council passes legislation requiring Swiss political parties to disclose party financing sources and campaign donations starting with the 2023 elections.

=== September ===
- 5 September – Swiss Digital Days 2022 begins, offering over 100 events on digitalization, including herHACK (women in tech), GreenTech Startup Battle (sustainability), and NextGen Future Skills Labs (future skills), with both in-person and online participation.

=== November ===
- 23 November – The General Council Summit Switzerland 2022 is held in Zurich, discussing ESG law, term sheets, dispute management, and remote work regulations.

== Deaths ==
- 7 January – Laurence Boissier, writer and artist (born 1965)
- 20 January – René Robert, photographer (born 1936)
- 21 January – Marcel Mauron, footballer (FC La Chaux-de-Fonds, national team) (born 1929)
- 24 January – Silvia Gmür, architect (born 1939)
- 26 January – Gérald Ducimetière, artist (born 1940)
- 2 February – J. Alexander Baumann, politician (born 1942)
- 3 February – Georges Athanasiadès, organist and choirmaster (born 1929)
- 5 February – Emanuel Hurwitz, psychoanalyst and politician (born 1935)
- 6 February – Alice Moretti, politician (born 1921)
- 14 February – Francine-Charlotte Gehri, writer (born 1923)
- 8 March – Dominique Warluzel, lawyer and playwright (born 1957)
- 19 March – Pierre Naftule, writer and theatre director (born 1960)
- 10 May – Nessim Gaon, Sudanese born financier (born 1922)
- 2 June – Valentin Oehen, politician (born 1931)
- 10 July – Hans Frauenfelder, biophysicist (born 1922)
- 10 July – Marcel Rémy, mountaineer (born 1923)
- 12 July – Ivo Fürer, Roman Catholic prelate (born 1930)
- 14 July – Erica Pedretti, artist (born 1930)
- 15 July – Alice Pauli, artist (born 1922)
- 20 July – Judith Stamm, politician (born 1934)
- 22 July – Emilie Benes Brzezinski, sculptor (born 1932)
- 24 July – Kurt Pfammatter, ice hockey player (born 1941)
- 29 July – Hans Bangerter, football administrator (born 1924)
- 5 August – Mariella Mehr, writer (born 1947)
- 13 August – Antoine Poncet, sculptor (born 1928)
- 21 August – Oliver Frey, visual artist (born 1948)
- 22 August – Fredy Studer, drummer (born 1948)
- 28 August – Peter Stephan Zurbriggen, Roman Catholic archbishop (born 1943)
- 5 September – Mariella Mehr, writer (born 1947)
- 5 September – Margrith Bigler-Eggenberger, jurist (born 1933)
- 9 September – Pierre Muller, politician (born 1952)
- 11 September – Alain Tanner, film director (born 1929)
- 13 September – Jean-Luc Godard, film director (Breathless, Bande à part, Pierrot le Fou), screenwriter and critic (born 1930)
- 16 September – Heinz Allenspach, Swiss politician, MP (born 1928)
- 17 September – Mathias Feldges, politician, member of the Executive Council of Basel-Stadt (born 1937)
- 18 September – Nicolas Schindelholz, footballer (born 1988)
- 3 October – Simon Hallenbarter, Olympic biathlete (born 1979)
- 15 December – Renée Colliard, alpine skier (born 1933)
