= Tobias Madison =

Swiss artist (born 1985)

- Born: 1985 (age 40–41); Basel, Switzerland
- Education: Zurich University of the Arts
- Known for: Multidisciplinary conceptual art, performance art

Tobias Madison (born 1985) is a Swiss artist, known for his multidisciplinary conceptual art, moving image work, and performance art. His work frequently uses video, photography, text and installation to probe the economy of interpersonal relations in mediated realities. Madison currently lives and works in New York City.

== Biography ==
Tobias Madison was born in 1985 in Basel, Switzerland. In 2011 he received a B.F.A. degree from Zurich University of the Arts (ZHDK).

Since 2015, he has taught in the graduate program (work.master) of the Geneva University of Art and Design (Haute école d'art et de design or HEAD).

== Career ==
Madison's work has had solo exhibitions at the Swiss Institute (2010) in New York City, Haus Konstruktiv (2010) in Zurich, Kunstverein Munich (2010), Kunsthalle Zürich (2013), the Power Station in Dallas (with Emanuel Rossetti and Stefan Tcherepnin, 2013), Kestnergesellschaft (2016) in Hanover, Germany, and MoMA PS1 in New York (with Matthew Lutz-Kinoy, 2016).

His work is in many museum collections including the Kunsthaus Zurich, the Carnegie Museum of Art in Pittsburgh, and the Museum of Modern Art (MoMA) in New York City.

=== New Jerseyy ===
Madison co-founded the exhibition space New Jerseyy in Basel in 2008, together with curator Daniel Baumann, artist Emanuel Rossetti, and graphic designer Dan Solbach. New Jerseyy's program was focused both on a local and an international audience and presented solo exhibitions of Carissa Rodriguez, DAS INSTITUT (Kerstin Brätsch and Adele Roder), Ei Arakawa, Anne Imhof, Ida Ekblad, and Stefan Tcherepnin.

Experimental exhibition formats for New Jerseyy included a 2008 temporary boxing gym with John Armleder and his student collective Team 404 and a 2009 MFA degree thesis show of students of the Graphic Design Department of the Yale University School of Art.

=== Collaborations ===
In 2012, Madison co-curated an exhibition with Emanuel Rossetti at the Kunsthalle Bern that focused on collaborative practices and artistic networks that are spun between Tbilisi, New York City, Tokyo, and Berlin. The French art-historian Mélanie Mermod curated the section APN Research あぷん with images by the media collective Jikken Kōbō (experimental workshop) that were published weekly between 1953 and 1954 in the Asahi Graph (Japanese: アサヒグラフ Asahi Gurafu).

In 2013, Madison collaborated with artist Emanuel Rossetti and artist and composer Stefan Tcherepnin on the exhibition Drip Event at the Power Station in Dallas. The project is documented in the Solar Lice LP, which was recorded at ISSUE Project Room.

In 2015, Madison developed an adaptation of Shuji Terayama's 1967 play La Marie-Vison together with artist Matthew Lutz-Kinoy and theater director Barbara Weber for the Kunsthalle Zurich. In 2016 the play was further developed by Madison and Lutz-Kinoy for a commission by MoMA PS1, titled Rotten Wood, the Dripping Word: Shuji Terayama's Kengawa No Mari.

=== Film ===
In 2016, Madison produced a remake of Shuji Terayama's 1971 film Emperor Tomato Ketchup, with a group of kindergarteners from Hannover, Germany. The resulting film, Das Blut, Im Fruchtfleisch Gerinnend Beim Birnenbiss (2016), is an exploration of the child's mind and the projections that it is exposed to.

In 2018, Madison shot O Vermelho do Meio-Dia in São Paulo, Brazil with members of the Queer activist group MEXA in the months leading up to the election of far-right president Jair Bolsonaro. The film premiered in November 2018 at the Biennale d'Image en Mouvement in Geneva. After its premiere Madison pulled the film from other festivals to continue to work on it.

== Bibliography ==
- Madison, Tobias (2015). NO; NO; H E P. Zurich: JRP Ringier. ISBN 978-3037643907
- Madison, Tobias; Rossetti, Emanuel; Tcherepnin, Stefan (2014). Solar Lice. Dallas: The Power Station. ISBN 978-0984023059
- Madison, Tobias (2011). Drawings. Zurich: 978-3-906011.ch. ISBN 978-3906011042
