= Robin Rhode =

South African artist based in Berlin (born 1976)

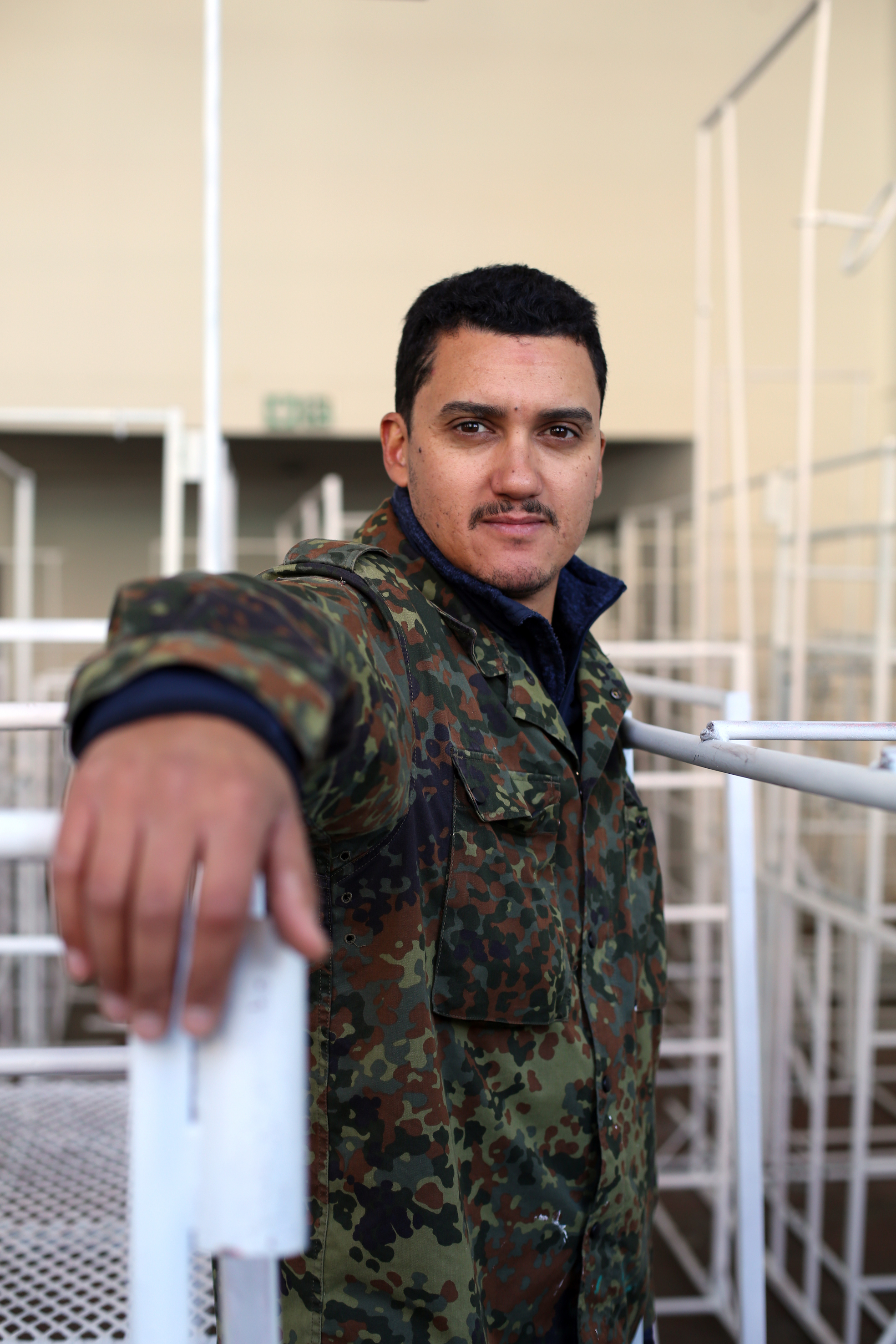
- Rhode in 2018
- Born: 1976 (age 49–50); Cape Town, South Africa
- Education: Technikon Witwatersrand; South African School of Motion Picture Medium and Live Performance
- Occupation: Artist

Robin Rhode (born 1976) is a South African artist based in Berlin, Germany. He has made wall drawings, photographs and sculptures.

== Early life and education ==
Rhode was born in Cape Town, South Africa. He studied fine art at Technikon Witwatersrand in Johannesburg (now the University of Johannesburg), followed by postgraduate work in 2000 at the South African School of Motion Picture Medium and Live Performance.

== Work ==
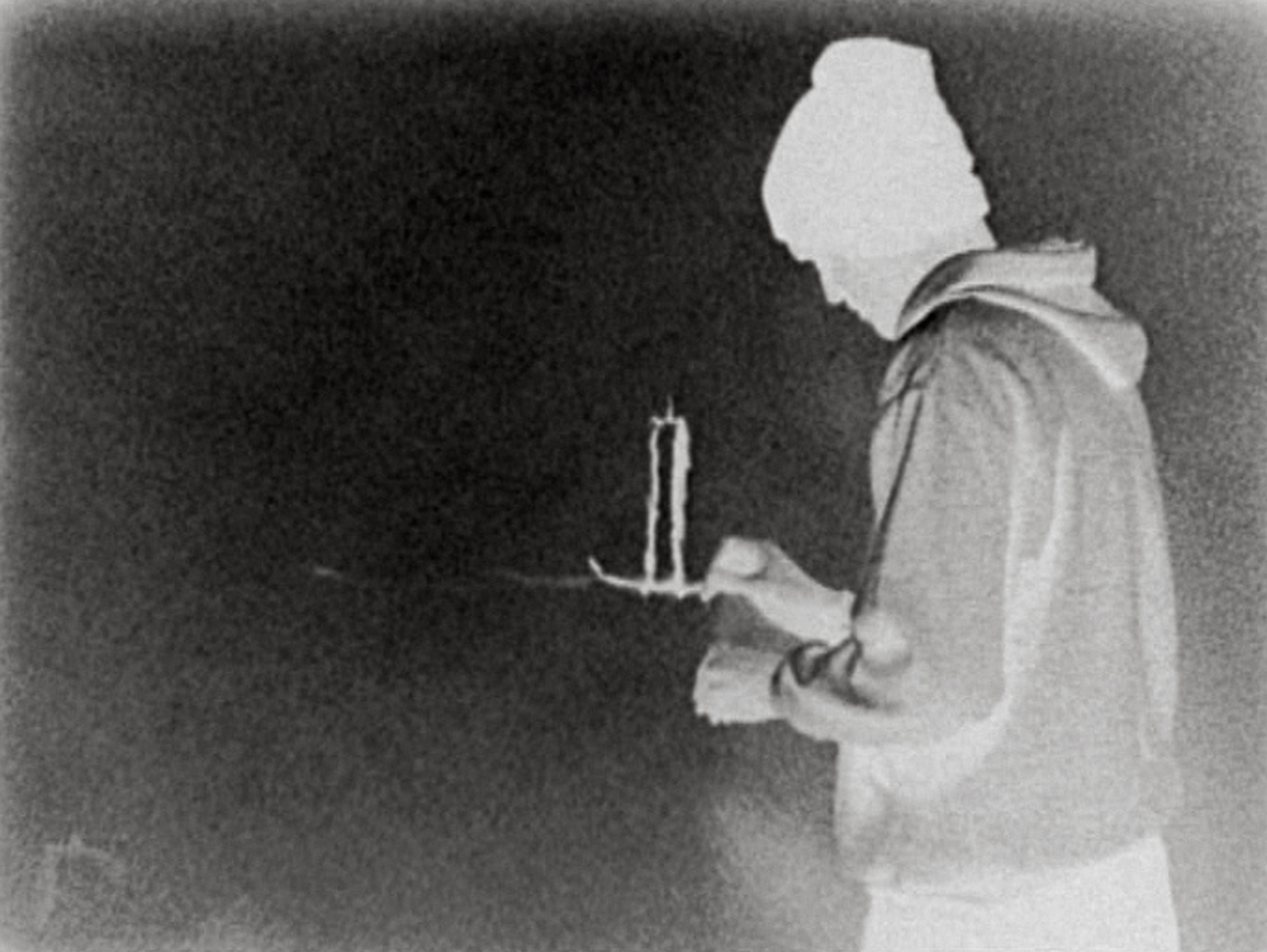
Robin Rhode, "the candle"

Rhode is represented by Lehmann Maupin.

In November 2009, he provided stop-frame video animations for a performance by Leif Ove Andsnes of Mussorgsky's Pictures at an Exhibition at the Lincoln Center in New York.

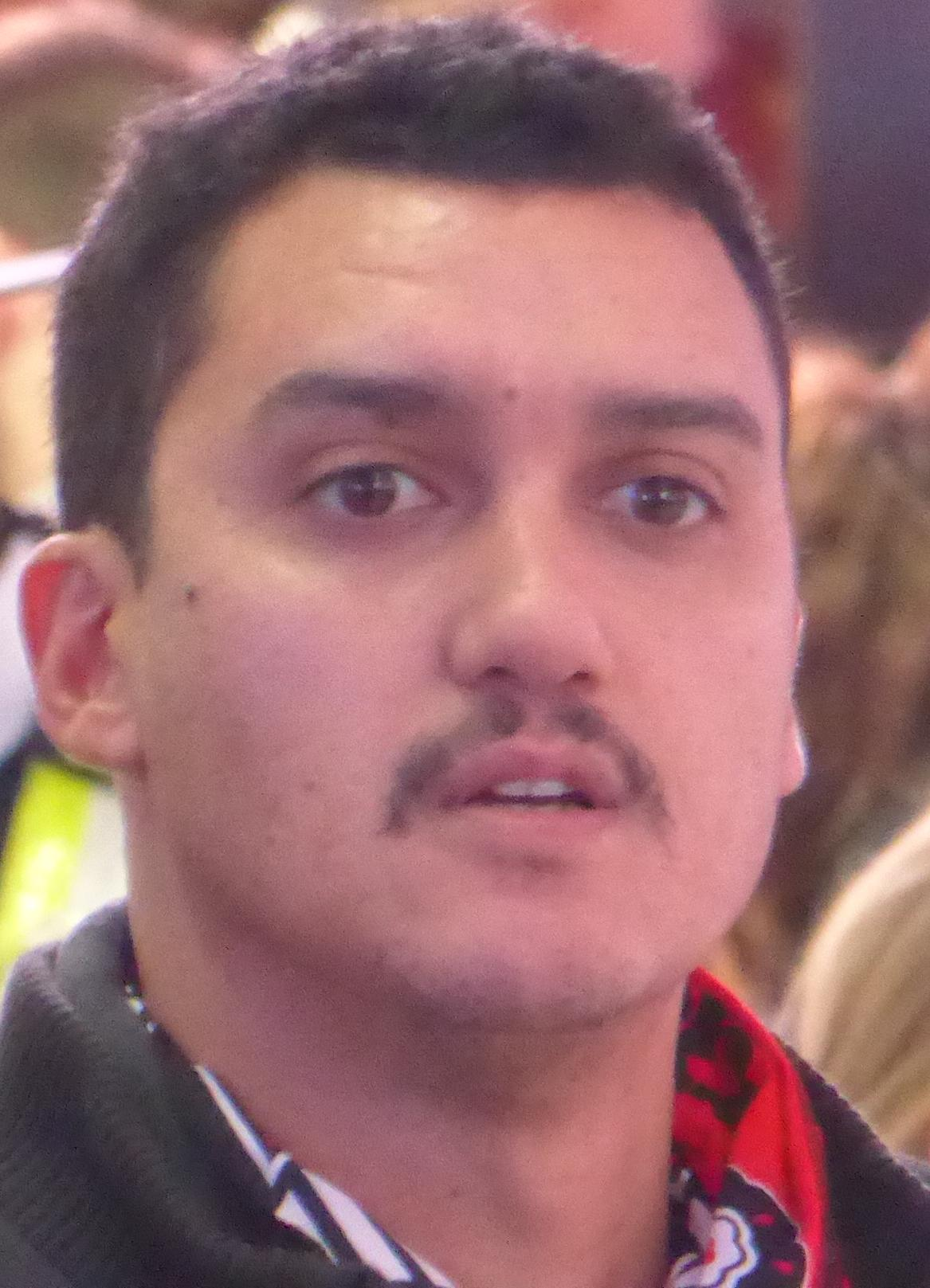
Rhode on Times Square for Erwartung

In 2014, Rhode directed a music video for the U2 single "Every Breaking Wave"; it includes stop-frame animation stencil drawings, and figures that interact with them.

=== Exhibitions and performances ===
- Fresh, South African National Gallery, Cape Town, South Africa (2000, performance)
- The Score, Artists Space, New York (2004, performance)
- Street Smart, Rubell Family Collection, Miami (2005, solo exhibition)
- Empieza el Juego, Zaragoza, Madrid (2006, solo exhibition)
- The Storyteller, FRAC Champagne-Ardenne, France (2006, solo exhibition)
- All About Laughter: The Role of Humour in Contemporary Art, Mori Art Museum, Tokyo (2007, performance)
- Walk Off, Haus der Kunst, Munich, Germany (2007, solo exhibition)
- Who Saw Who, Hayward Gallery, London, UK, (2008, solo exhibition)
- Catch Air: Robin Rhode, The Wexner Center for the Arts, Columbus, Ohio (2009, solo exhibition)
- Robin Rhode and Leif Ove Andsnes: Pictures Reframed, Lincoln Center, New York (2009, performance)
- Robin Rhode, Los Angeles County Museum of Art (2010, solo exhibition)
- Paries Pictus, Castello di Rivoli, Turin, Italy (2011, solo exhibition)
- The Call of Walls, National Gallery of Victoria, Melbourne, Australia (2013, solo exhibition)
- Animating the Everyday, Neuberger Museum of Art, Purchase College, State University of New York (2014, solo exhibition)
- The Sudden Walk, The House of Culture (Stockholm), Sweden (2015, solo exhibition and performance)
- Drawing Waves, Drawing Center, New York (2015, solo exhibition)
- Robin Rhode: Robin Rhode, North Carolina Museum of Art, USA (September 2015, solo exhibition)
- Arnold Schoenberg's Erwartung in partnership with Performa, Wet Ink Ensemble conducted by Arturo Tamayo, Times Square, New York (November 7 & 8, 2015)
- The Moon is Asleep, SCAD Museum of Art, Savannah, Georgia, USA (February 2016, solo exhibition and performance)
- Under the Sun, Tel Aviv Museum of Art, Israel (2017, solo exhibition)
- A Plan of the Soul, Haus Konstruktiv, Zürich, Switzerland (October 2018, solo exhibition and performance)
- Memory Is the Weapon, Kunstmuseum Wolfsburg, Wolfsburg, Germany (2019)
- Memory Is the Weapon, Kunsthalle Krems, Krems an der Donau, Austria (2020)
- Museum Voorlinden, Wassenaar, The Netherlands (2021)

== Reception ==
In 2018, he won the Zurich Art Prize. Examples of his work are held by the Museum of Modern Art in New York, the Detroit Institute of Arts in Detroit, Michigan, and the Solomon R. Guggenheim Museum in New York.
