= Sonia Kacem =

Swiss visual artist (b. 1985)

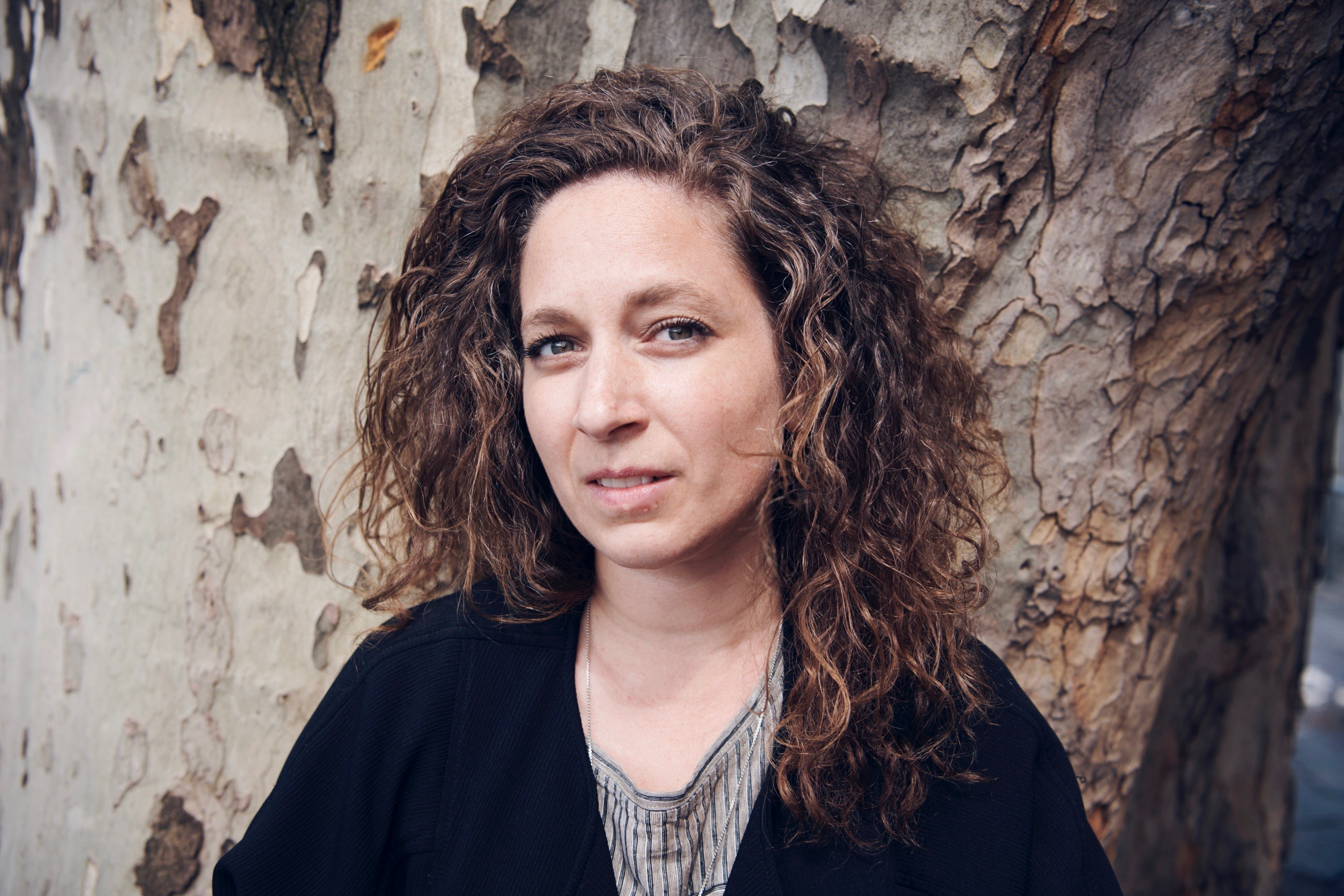
- Kacem in 2019
- Born: 1985 (age 40–41); Geneva, Romandy, Switzerland
- Education: Geneva University of Art and Design
- Occupation: Visual artist
- Known for: Sculpture, installation art
- Website: Official website

Sonia Kacem (born 1985) is a Swiss visual artist, of Swiss and Tunisian descent. She is known for her sculptures and installation art. She has lived in both Amsterdam, and Geneva.

== Biography ==
Sonia Kacem was born in 1985 in Geneva, Switzerland. Her mother is Swiss and her father is Tunisian. She studied at Geneva University of Art and Design, where she obtained a bachelor's degree in 2009 and then a master's degree in 2011.

Kacem was the winner of the Manor Cultural Prize 2014; Kiefer Hablitzel Göhner Art Prize in 2015; and the Zurich Art Prize 2021, from the museum Haus Konstruktiv and the Zurich Insurance Group Ltd. From 2016 to 2017, she was awarded a residency and grant from the Rijksakademie van Beeldende Kunsten, in Amsterdam. In 2019, she was awarded the residency at Pro Helvetia Cairo.

Her work is in museum collections, including at Migros Museum of Contemporary Art.

== Solo exhibitions ==
- 2021, museum Haus Konstruktiv, Zurich, Switzerland
- 2019, Between the Scenes, Westfälischer Kunstverein, Münster, Germany
- 2018, Did snow fall on the pyramids?, T293, Rome, Italy
- 2017, Carcass, Swiss Cultural Center, Paris, France
- 2016, Night Shift, Centre d’Art Contemporain, Geneva, Switzerland
- 2015, The Flâneur, T293, Naples, Italy
- 2015, Bermuda Triangle, Kunsthalle St. Gallen, St. Gallen, Switzerland
- 2015, Loulou Replay, Kunstverein Nürnberg, Nuremberg, Germany
- 2014, Loulou, MAMCO, Geneva, Switzerland
- 2013, Petra, Gregor Staiger, Zürich, Switzerland
- 2013, Thérèse, Athenaeum Palace, Salle Crosnier, Geneva, Switzerland
- 2011, Progress MI 07, Gregor Staiger, Zürich, Switzerland
