= Leonor Antunes =

Portuguese contemporary artist

- Born: 1972 (age 53–54); Lisbon, Portugal
- Education: Escola Superior de Teatro e Cinema; Universidade de Lisboa; State Academy of Fine Arts Stuttgart
- Known for: Site-specific architectural / sculptural installations
- Movement: Modernism

Leonor Antunes (born 1972, Lisbon, Portugal) is a Portuguese contemporary artist who creates sculptural installations. She lives and works in Berlin.

== Early life and education ==
Leonor Antunes was born in Lisbon in 1972. After high school, she attended the Escola Superior de Teatro e Cinema, studying staging for a year. She then attended the University of Lisbon for a "broader form of visual art" and earned a degree in 1998 from the Faculty of Fine Art. She then lived in Karlsruhe and attended the Staatliche Akademie der Bildenden Künste. Her first major exhibition occurred in 1999 at the Bienal de Maia.

== Critical reception ==
Jenny Gheith wrote, "Leonor Antunes carries ghosts with her. Spirits of artists, designers, and architects she admires wander from exhibition to exhibition, object to object. Her sculptures capture glimpses of their histories, their lives, and their materials. Details are extracted, measurements are recalculated, and connections between artists resurface in ways that conflate physical, measurable experience with the effects of memory and time."

Describing Antunes' sculptures at San Francisco Museum of Modern Art, Lydia Yee said they "conflate physical, measurable experience with the effects of memory and time. Layered with historical and material references, her installations extract details and components from work by artists, architects, and designers associated with modernism". Ceci Moss wrote, "Surrounding the visitor, Antunes' skillful maneuvering of space, material, light, and texture allow the voices of a feminist history largely unsung to resound and become anew."

Cal Revely-Calder, curator of Antunes' 2017 exhibit at Whitechapel Gallery in London described her work, "like an answer, a reaction to the historical and architectural context of the place where exposed".

Her design, "A Secluded and Pleasant Land in This Land I Wish to Dwell," reflects the works of textile artist Anni Albers and films of Maya Deren. Commenting on Antunes' intentional echoing of their works, New York Times critic Martha Schwendener wrote that the benefit is being able to compare their works with Antunes' works, and learn more about art history. However, Schwendener writes, by comparison, the contrast is lopsided, and "Ms. Antunes's work is elegant and accomplished but a little anemic."

Alexa Lawrence, reviewing Antune's exhibition, "I Stand Like a Mirror Before You" in New York's New Museum lobby gallery, said Antunes "investigates human negotiations with space and surface", and also observed, "Reflections in the gallery's glass wall multiply knots and lines into an illusory forest of unruly vertical forms (perhaps a nod to Deren's theory of cinema as a reflective screen). There is no clear start or finish here, no single path through—only space and its infinite possibilities."

== Selected exhibitions ==
Since 2007, Antunes has exhibited internationally, at Wiels in Brussels (2010); the CAPC Musée d’art contemporain de Bordeaux; Kunsthalle Basel (2013); the Perez Art Museum Miami (2014); the San Francisco Museum of Modern Art (2016); Whitechapel Gallery in London (2017); and Museo Tamayo in Mexico City (2018). Her work was selected for the 2017 Venice Biennale, in the main exhibition titled "Viva Arte Viva", curated by Christine Macel. In 2019, she represented Portugal at the Venice Biennale.

== Collections ==
According to Blouin Artinfo, Antunes' art is held in the following permanent collections: Tate Collection, London; Dailmer Collection, Stuttgart; Associacao Nacional de Farmacia, Lisbon; Calouste Gulbenkian Foundation, Lisbon; Yerba Buena Center for the Arts, San Francisco; Caixa Geral de Depósitos, Lisbon; Musée d’Art Moderne de la Ville de Paris; Fonds National d’Ats Contemporains, France; Museo Reina Sofia, Madrid; Fiorucci Art Trust, London; San Francisco Museum of Modern Art; Perez Art Museum Miami; and CAPC musée d'art contemporain de Bordeaux.

== Awards ==
In 2018, Antunes won the $100,000 Zurich Art Prize, administered by the Museum Haus Konstruktiv together with the Zurich Insurance Group.
