= Latifa Echakhch =

Moroccan-French visual artist (born 1974)

- Born: 1974 (age 51–52); El Khnansa, Morocco
- Citizenship: MoroccanFrench
- Occupation: Visual artist
- Years active: 2000s–present
- Known for: Contemporary art, installations
- Honours: Participation in Venice Biennale (2011), Marcel Duchamp Prize winner (2013)

Latifa Echakhch (Arabic: لطيفة الشخش; born 1974) is a Moroccan-French visual artist. Working in Switzerland, she creates installations. She participated in the Venice Biennale in 2011 and won the Marcel Duchamp Prize in 2013.

== Early life and education ==
Latifa Echakhch was born in El-Khnansa, Morocco in 1974 and immigrated to France at the age of three. She attended the École supérieure d'Art de Grenoble and graduated from the National School of Arts Cergy-Pontoise and the Lyon National School of Fine Arts.

== Career ==
Echakhch began her career in 2002. In 2008, she was invited to exhibit her work at Tate Modern in London. In 2011, she participated to the Venice Biennale. She was awarded the Marcel Duchamp Prize in 2013. Alfred Pacquement, director of the Musée National d'Art Moderne (Pompidou Centre), who was president of the jury, said: "Her work, between surrealism and conceptualism, questions with economy and precision the importance of symbols and reflects the fragility of modernism." In December 2015, she was the first woman guest curator of the annual Masters' exhibition at the Haute École d'art et de design Genève, GET OUT.

=== Exhibitions ===
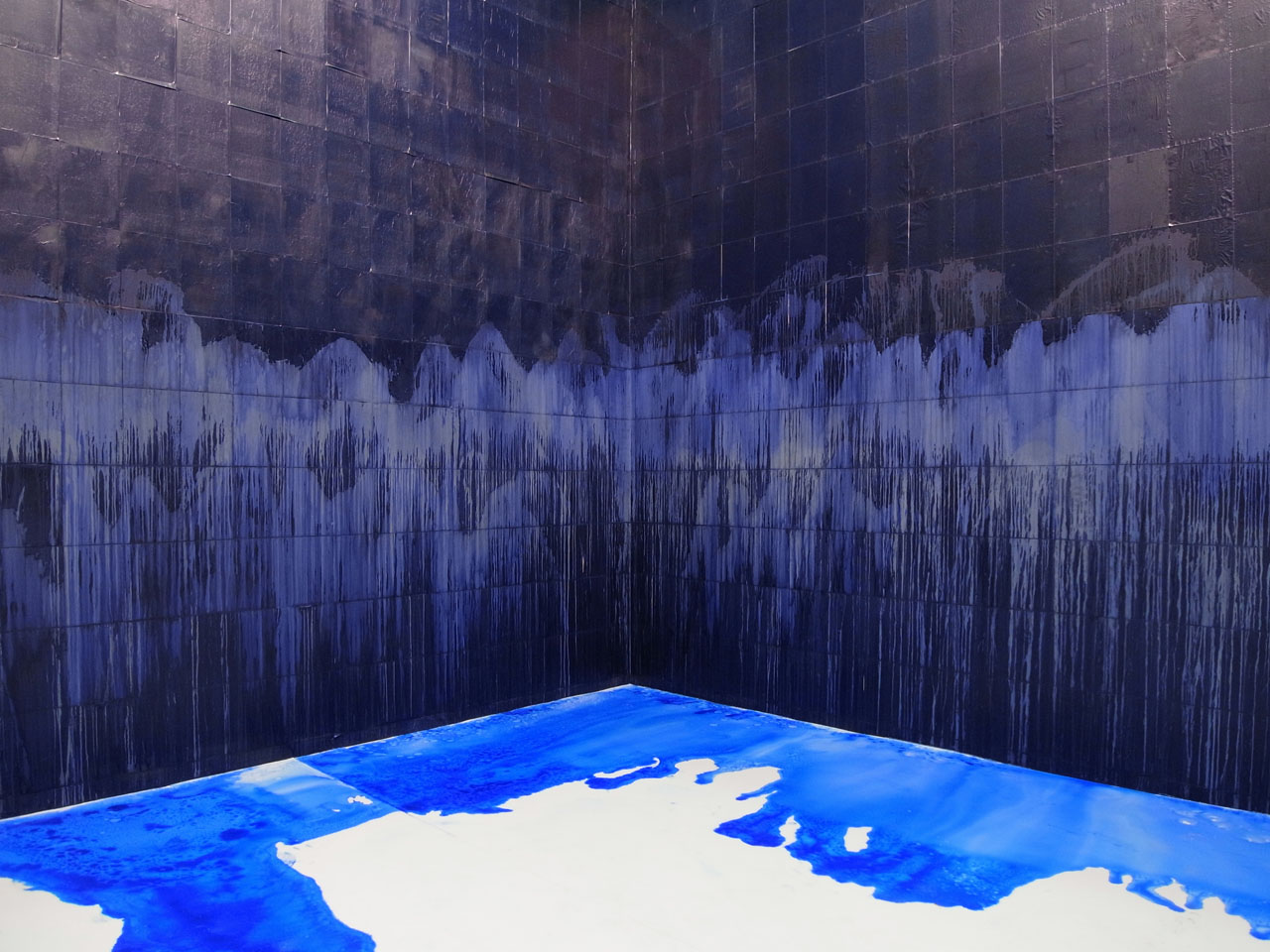
A chaque stencil une révolution in Art Basel 2010, Kleinbasel

- 2007: Le Magasin, Grenoble
- 2008: Tate Modern, London
- 2009: Fridericianum, Kassel
- 2009: Latifa Echakhch – Partitures, Bielefelder Kunstverein, Bielefeld
- 2009: Swiss Institute Contemporary Art New York, New York
- 2010: Le Rappel des oiseaux, FRAC Champagne-Ardenne; then in the Galleria d'arte moderna e contemporanea di Bergamo (GAMeC), Bergamo, Italy
- 2012: Latifa Echakhch – The Birds. Project under the European Cultural Days of the ECB. Portikus, Frankfurt
- 2013: Latifa Echakhch – Laps, Musée d'art contemporain de Lyon, Lyon
- 2013: Hammer Museum, Los Angeles
- 2015: Latifa Echakhch – Screen Shot, Zurich Art Prize 2015, Haus Konstruktiv, Zürich
- 2016: Cross Fade, The Power Plant, Toronto
- 2017: Crowd Fade, Istanbul Biennial, Istanbul
- 2018: Falling, Lovely and beautiful, KIOSK, Ghent
- 2018: Le Jardin Mécanique, New National Museum of Monaco
- 2018: Sensory Spaces 14, Museum Boijmans Van Beuningen, Rotterdam
- 2019: Romance, Fondazione Memmo, Rome
- 2019: Freedom and Tree, Kunsthalle Mainz, Mainz
- 2020: The sun and The Set, BPS22, Charleroi
- 2022: The Concert, Swiss Pavilion, 59th International Art Exhibition, Venice Biennale.

== Private life ==
Echakhch lives and works in Martigny in Switzerland.

== Monographs ==
- Kamel Mennour, Latifa Echakhch, texts by Jean-Christophe Ammann, Latifa Echakhch, Annabelle Gugnon, Bernard Marcadé, Zürich / Dijon, Switzerland / France, JRP | Ringier Kunstverlag / Les Presses real, 2012, ISBN 978-2-914171-46-5
- Thierry Raspail, Latifa Echakhch. Laps, Lyon, France, Musée d'art contemporain de Lyon, 2013, ISBN 978-2-90646-187-1
