= Nairy Baghramian =

German artist

- Born: Նաիրի Բաղրամյան (Armenian) نائیری باغرامیان (Persian); 1971 (age 54–55); Isfahan, Iran
- Education: Berlin University of the Arts
- Movement: Modernism, Abstract art, Post-minimalism, Minimalism, Contemporary Art

Nairy Baghramian (born 1971) is an Iranian-born German visual artist of Armenian ethnicity. Since 1984, she has lived and worked in Berlin. Using an extensive repertoire of techniques, materials, and forms, Baghramian’s site-responsive sculptures and installations explore the relationship between architecture, objects, and the human figure.

When the Solomon R. Guggenheim Museum selected Baghramian as a finalist for the 2020 Hugo Boss Prize, they described Baghramian’s practice as: "...[Exploring] the workings of the body, gender, and public and private space."

== Early life and education ==
Baghramian was born in 1971, in Isfahan, Iran, the youngest child in an Armenian Iranian family. She and her mother flew to East Berlin in 1984, when she was 13, and later reunited in West Berlin with their family. She attended Berlin University of the Arts (Universität der Künste Berlin).

In addition to her artistic practice, Baghramian worked at the women’s shelter that her sister Louise co-founded.

== Work ==
Baghramian creates sculptural installations that reimagine the workings of the body and its connection to the spaces it inhabits. Inspired by dance classes she took as a child, Baghramian recalls her teacher speaking of the need to break down human movement into discrete elements. Her work depicts abstract forms of bodies or body parts, often contemplating the brokenness or "prosthetic" relationship between the body and its environment. Through a wide range of materials and techniques, Baghramian challenges traditional sculptural conventions, creating works that defy definitions and reveal new perspectives. A process of listening to and questioning materials is critical to her practice. “I have a very classical way of working, a traditional way of thinking of materials,” she says. “To get the sense of the politics of the material and the shapes, I have to understand it.”

For the Berlin Biennial, she collaborated with ninety-eight-year-old designer Janette Laverrière to create a set for her furniture design.

In 2017, Baghramian's exhibition, Déformation Professionnelle, was on display in the Stedelijk Museum voor Actuele Kunst. This exhibition is the culmination of the artist's 18 sets of works from 1999 to 2016. Déformation Professionnelle exhibits the artist's oeuvre while alluding to existing works in her field. Through a site-responsive approach that incorporates sculptural elements and photography, she challenges conventional perspectives on the connection between human body gestures and their functions.

In 2019, Baghramian took part in Performa 19, collaborating with the artist Maria Hassabi. Inspired by the portraits taken by Carlo Mollino in the 1960s, they created Entre Deux Actes (Ménage à Quatre).

Between 2020 and 2021, Baghramian’s work was displayed in Ground/work at the Clark Art Institute. Creating Knee and Elbow, Baghramian was inspired by movement in the body.

== Recognition ==
In 2021, Baghramian received the 2022 Nasher Prize presented by the Nasher Sculpture Center in Dallas. She was later a member of the juries that selected Senga Nengudi (2023), Otobong Nkanga (2024) and Petrit Halilaj (2027) for the Nasher Prize.

== Exhibitions ==
- 2025: Niary Baghramian: nameless, Wiels, Brussels, Belgium
- 2024: Nairy Baghramian: Jumbled Alphabet, South London Gallery, London, United Kingdom
- 2023: The Façade Commission: Scratching the Back, The Metropolitan Museum of Art, New York, United States
- 2023: Nairy Baghramian: Jupon de Corps, Aspen Art Museum, Aspen, Colorado, United States
- 2022: Nairy Baghramian: Modèle vivant, Nasher Sculpture Center, Dallas, United States
- 2019: SOFT POWER, San Francisco Museum of Modern Art, San Francisco, California, United States;
- 2017: documenta 14, Athens, Greece, and Kassel, Germany;
- 2017: Déformation Professionelle, Museum der Moderne, Salzburg, Austria;
- 2016: S.M.A.K. Museum of Contemporary Art, Ghent, Belgium;
- 2015: Nairy Baghramian: Hand Me Down, Museo Tamayo, Mexico City, Mexico;
- 2014: Sonae/Serralves Project 2014: Nairy Baghramian, Serralves Museum, Porto, Portugal;
- 2014: Nairy Baghramian: French Curve/Slip of the Tongue, Bluhm Family Terrace, Art Institute of Chicago, Chicago, Illinois, United States;
- 2014: Nairy Baghramian: Off the Rack, Neuer Berliner Kunstverein, Berlin, Germany;
- 2013: Retainer, Sculpture Center, Long Island City, New York, United States;
- 2013: Nairy Baghramian: Fluffing the Pillows (Moorings, gurneys, Silos, Mops, News Rack, Railing), MIT List Visual Arts Center, Cambridge, United States;
- 2012: Nairy Baghramian: Class Reunion, The Contemporary Art Gallery, Vancouver, Canada;
- 2012: Fluffing the Pillows, Kunsthalle Mannheim, Mannheim, Germany

== Awards ==
- 2025 – Art Basel Award, Basel, Switzerland
- 2023 – Nivola Award for Sculpture, Museo Nivola, Orani, Italy
- 2023 – Aspen Award for Art, Aspen Art Museum, Aspen, Colorado
- 2022 – Nasher Prize, Dallas Texas;
- 2020 – Hugo Boss Prize (finalist);
- 2019 – Malcolm McLaren Award, Performa 19, New York, NY
- 2016 – Zurich Art Prize, Zurich, Switzerland;
- 2014 – Arnold-Bode Prize, Kassel, Germany;
- 2012 – Hector Prize, Kunsthalle Mannheim, Mannheim, Germany;
- 2007 – Ernst Schering Foundation Award

== Personal life ==
Baghramian has been in a relationship with art dealer Michel Ziegler.
