= Ying Gao =

Canadian fashion designer and professor (born 1973)

- Born: 1973 (age 52–53); Beijing
- Education: Geneva University of Art and Design (BA), Université du Québec à Montréal (MA)
- Occupation: Fashion designer

Ying Gao (born 1973) is a Chinese-born Canadian fashion designer and professor best known for her experimental clothing which includes integrated robotics. Her designs often respond to stimuli from the world around the wearer. She also works as a professor at the Université du Québec à Montréal and headed the Fashion, Jewelry, and Accessories Design program at HEAD Geneva.

== Biography ==
Gao was born in 1973 in China and grew up between Switzerland and China due to one of her parents being a diplomat. She first became interested in fashion after seeing a Yves Saint Laurent show. In a interview done by Sixtysix magazine, Gao has stated that it is the design and object aspect that fascinates her rather than art as a whole. She earned her bachelor's degree at HEAD Geneva and earned her master's degree in interactive multimedia from the Université du Québec à Montréal.

She has worked as the head of the Fashion, Jewelry, and Accessories Design program at HEAD Geneva and works as a professor at the Université du Québec à Montréal.

She is best known for her designs, which she calls "speculative design". These designs are known for interacting with their environment in varying ways through robotic components. She is often inspired by philosophy, novels, and cinema.

One of her best-known collections is "Flowing Water, Standing Time", inspired by Oliver Sacks's The Man Who Mistook His Wife for a Hat. In this collection, the dresses respond to colors in the surroundings and move. Another one of her best-known collections is her 2024 collection "All Mirrors", inspired by Umberto Eco. In this collection, the dresses, made of soft mirrors, move when detecting people's eyes on them. Her 2013 collection "(No)where (Now)here", inspired by Paul Virilio, was shown at the Textile Museum of Canada and the Power Station of Art.

She is also known for her "Possible Tomorrow" collection, which twists and curls when identifying strangers through a fingerprint detector. Her "Walking City" collection, which incorporated pneumatic pumps so the clothes appeared to breathe, was shown at the Musée national des beaux-arts du Québec. Her 2022 collection "2 5 2 6" was inspired by NFTs and virtual fashion. In 2023, She created In Camera, an interactive garment that captures an image of the viewer when it detects that they are being photographed. Her 2025 collection, "Charlotte and Everyone Else", utilizes non-real faces which trick artificial intelligence. Her collection "Incertitudes" utilized sharp pins and was activated by sound: a piece from that collection was shown at the Museum of Fine Arts, Boston. and the Metropolitan Museum of Art, New York.

She has also created lines of clothing to be sold and distributed more traditionally.
