= Mai-Thu Perret =

Swiss artist of Franco-Vietnamese origin (born 1976)

- Born: Mai-Thu Perret; 1976 (age 49–50); Geneva, Switzerland
- Occupations: Artist, writer

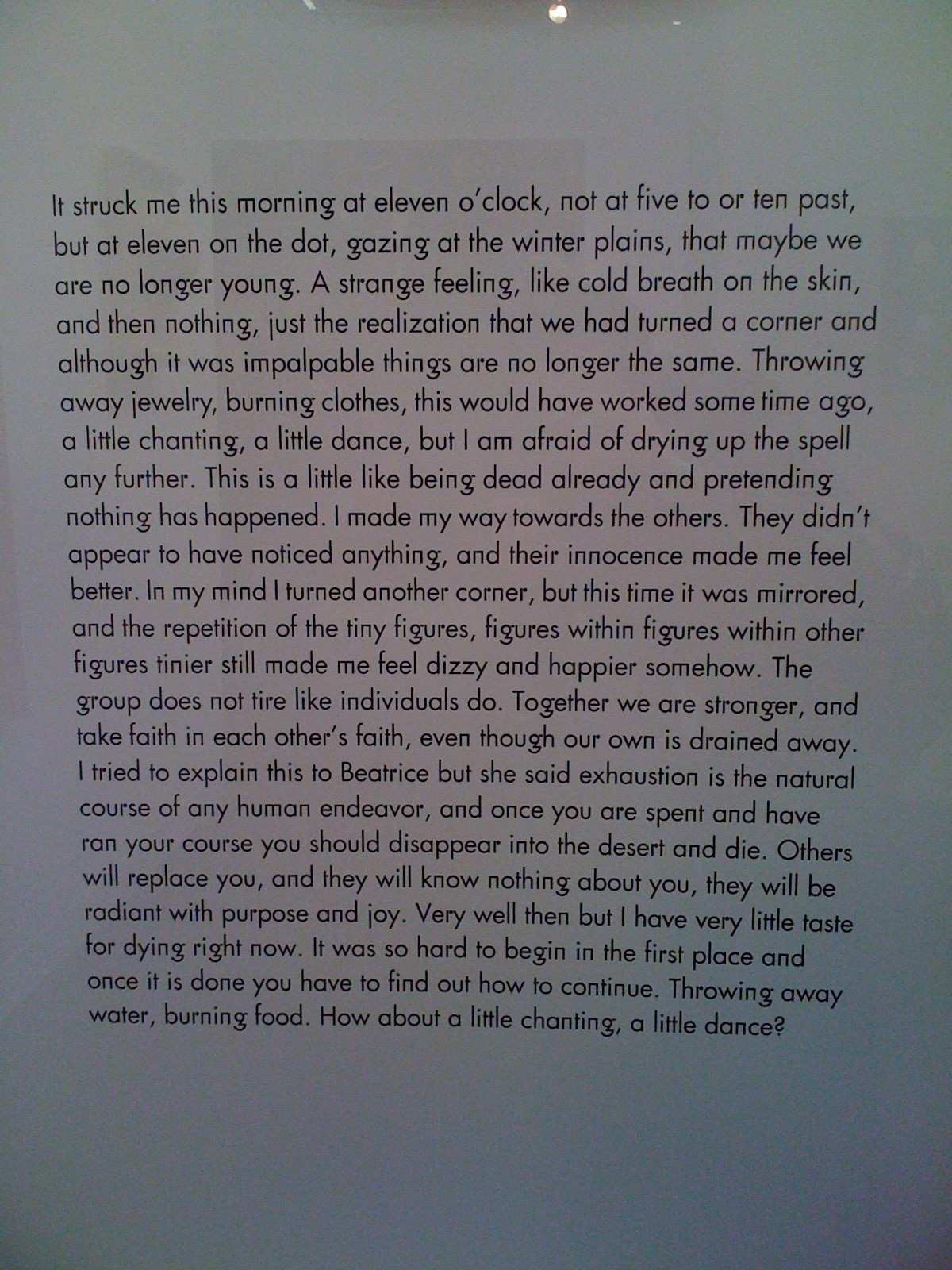
A photo of a framed text piece by Mai-Thu Perret. It is presented as an artifact from the project The Crystal Frontier

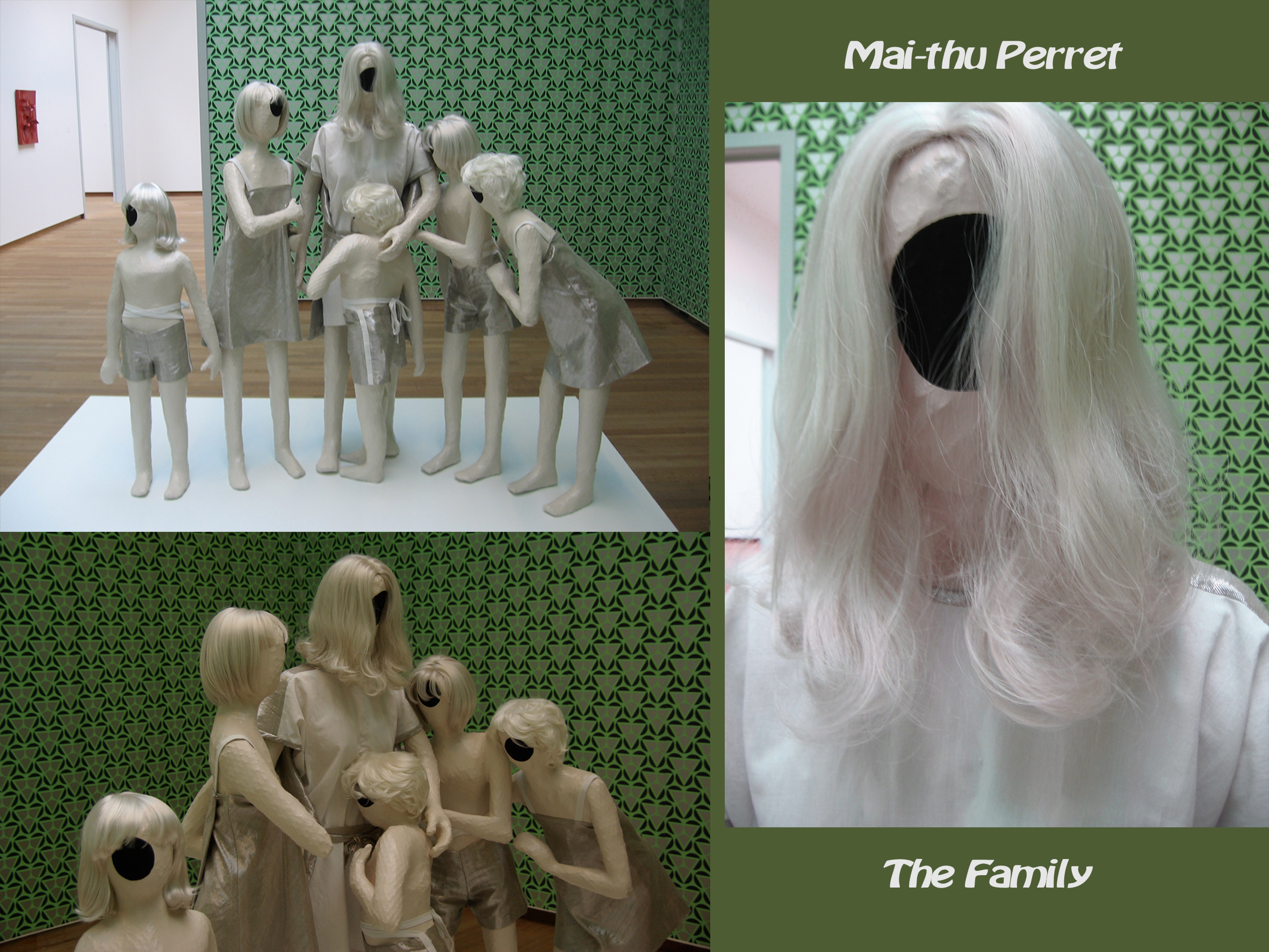
Mai-thu Perret – The Family

Mai-Thu Perret (born 1976 in Geneva) is a Swiss artist of Franco-Vietnamese origin. Perret's work is multidisciplinary, installation-based, and performative, combining feminist politics with literary texts, homemade crafts and 20th century avant-garde aesthetics.

== Early life and education ==
Perret was born in Geneva, Switzerland in 1976. She received her BA in English Literature from Cambridge University, Cambridge, England in 1997. From 2002 to 2003, Perret was enrolled in the Whitney Independent Study Program at the Whitney Museum of American Art, New York, NY.

== Work ==
Since 1999, Mai-Thu Perret has been working on a project entitled The Crystal Frontier – a chronicle of the lives and work of a fictional group of women self-exiled in New Mexico. Calling their utopian feminist commune "New Ponderosa Year Zero." Perret's multidisciplinary project manifests in a number of ways, including film, performance, writings, artifacts, sculptures, and more, all produced by the women in the fictitious commune.

"New Ponderosa Year Zero is the true life story of a group of girls, in their 20s and 30s, who decided to follow the activist Beatrice Mandell and create an autonomous community in the desert country of New Mexico. While the reasons for their discontent with mainstream society were different for each of the girls, they all shared the desire to give this unlikely social experiment a try. The decision to make it all-female did not stem from their personal hatred of men, but from Mandell's conviction that a truly non-patriciarchal social organization had to be built from the ground up, starting with a core group of women who would have to learn how to be perfectly self-sufficient before being able to include men in the community. Mandell's theories were a mixture of classic feminist beliefs about the oppression of women, and what could best be described as her psychedelic-pastoral tendencies."

Perret's background in literature provides a starting point for her interdisciplinary work. Inspired by autonomous and squatting communities in her hometown of Geneva, Switzerland, Perret blends her reverence for modernist movements such at the Bauhaus into cross-platform artworks.

Since roughly 2016, the artist has moved on from The Crystal Frontier body of work to focus on other narrative projects. Perret often integrates historical figures from art and literature into her work, as with her sculpture Autoprogettazione I (2011), a kiln-fired concrete copy of an Enzo Mari table meant to be produced easily by the general public, revolutionizing the furniture industry in the mid-1970s. With the new body of work, Les guérillères X (2016), Perret is developing an all-female militia: life-size female figures sculpted from materials such as ceramic, wicker, papier-mâché, latex, bronze, and armed with rifles made of translucent plastic.

Perret has works in the collection of the Museum of Modern Art.

=== Performative Work ===
In 2011, Perret presented Love Letters in Ancient Brick, a dance performance piece at the Swiss Institute/ Contemporary Art New York. Love Letters was choreographed in collaboration with Laurence Yadi, and inspired by American comic- strip artist George Herriman's seminal work Krazy Kat. For the 2014 Biennale of Moving Images (BIM) in Geneva, Perret presented Figures. The production featured a life-sized marionette and took influence from bunraku, a Japanese style of puppetry. In 2016, in conjunction with Sightings, a solo exhibition at the Nasher Sculpture Center in Texas, Perret presented a restaging of the 2014 Figures and a new piece o, described as a "series of interventions throughout the museum."

=== Influences ===
In discussing The Crystal Frontier, Perret has cited a number of influences. Namely, Robert Smithson's text The Crystal Land, where the title of the project is derived. Other influences include Herland by Charlotte Perkins Gilman and The Blazing World by Margaret Cavendish, Duchess of Newcastle. Perret has also contributed to Frieze Magazine with an essay on the work of Ree Morton. Perret's current body of work, Les guérillères X (2016) is heavily influenced by the avant-garde writer and feminist theorist Monique Wittig and her 1969 book Les Guérillères.

== Awards ==
In 2011, Perret was awarded the Zurich Art Prize and Manor Cultural Prize. Her work was also a part of the 54th Venice Biennale under curator Bice Curiger's ILLUMInations.

== Selected bibliography ==
- Perret, Mai-Thu (ed.) Mai-Thu Perret: Land of Crystal. Zurich, Switzerland: JRP Ringier; New York, N.Y.: Distributed by D.A.P./Distributed Art Publishers, 2008. ISBN 978-3905701555
- Perret, Mai-Thu Mai-Thu Perret. Zurich, Switzerland: JRP Ringier; New York, N.Y.: Distributed by D.A.P./Distributed Art Publishers, 2011. ISBN 978-3037642016
