= Emmanuel Tarpin =

French jewelry designer

- Born: 15 June 1992 (age 34); Annecy, Haute-Savoie, France
- Education: Geneva University of Art and Design
- Occupation: Jewelry designer
- Years active: 2014–present
- Website: https://www.EmmanuelTarpin.com/

Emmanuel Tarpin (born 1992) is a French contemporary jewelry designer. Since 2018, he founded his self-titled atelier for high-end jewelry. He lives in Paris.

== Biography ==
Emmanuel Tarpin was born in 1992 in Annecy, Haute-Savoie, France. In childhood he practiced sculpture. Tarpin is openly queer.

He graduated from the Geneva University of Art and Design in 2014. After graduation he worked on the jewelry bench at Van Cleef & Arpels, and remained there for three years. In 2018, he founded his own atelier for high-end jewelry. In 2019, he made a capsule collection for Swiss luxury jeweler De Grisogono.

In 2019, he won the Town & Country Jewelry Award for "Breakthrough Designer of the Year". Celebrities that have worn his work include Mandy Moore, and Rihanna. Prices for Tarpin’s jewelry in 2019 started around 15,000 euros ($16,525 USD).
