= Gérald Ducimetière =

Swiss-French artist (1940–2022)

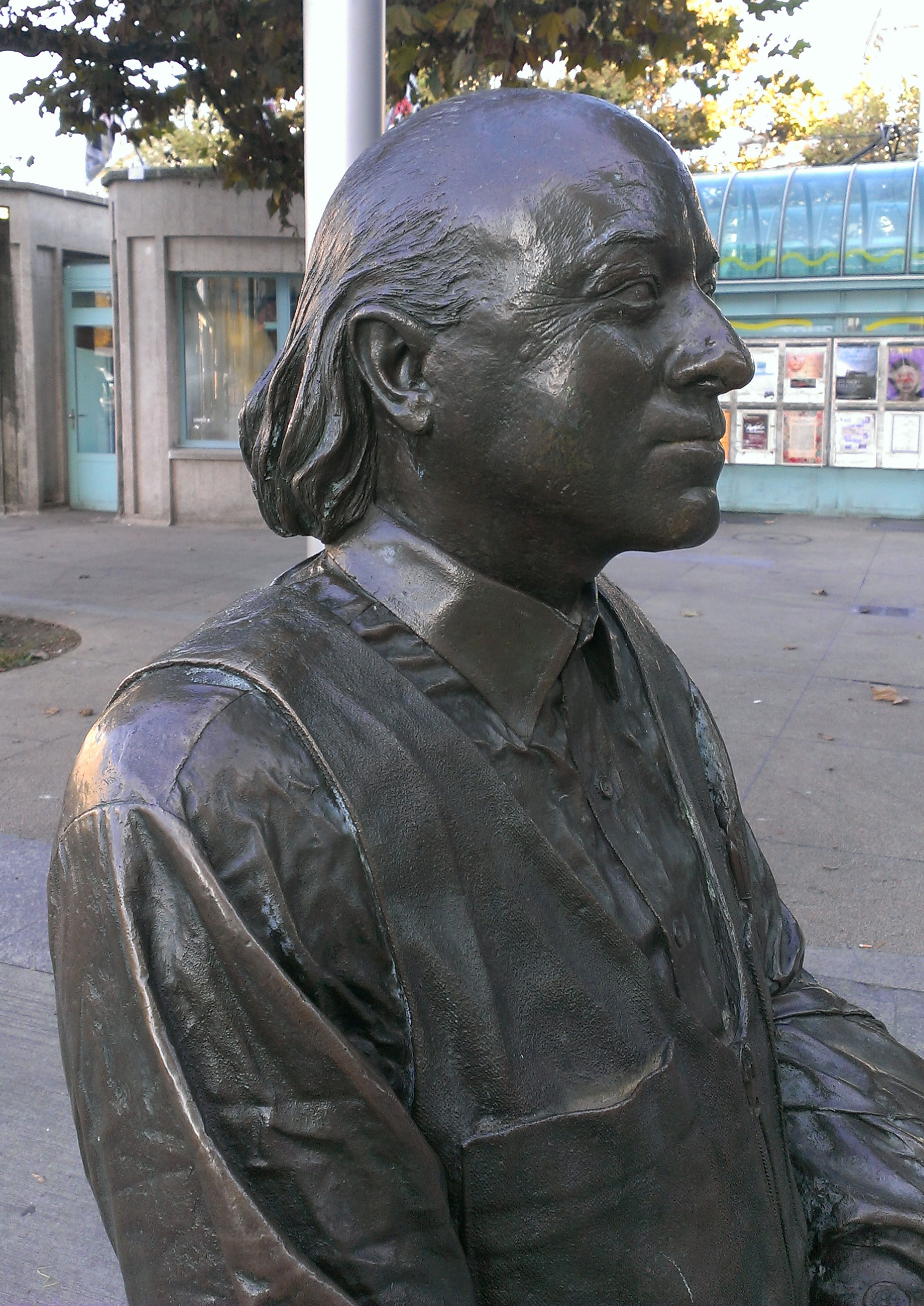
- Born: 26 April 1940; Veyrier, Switzerland
- Died: 26 January 2022 (aged 81); London, United Kingdom
- Education: Geneva University of Art and Design
- Occupation: Artist

Gérald Ducimetière (26 April 1940 – 26 January 2022) was a Swiss-born French artist. In 1994, he changed his name to John Aldus when he became a French national.

== Biography ==
After he finished his studies at the Geneva University of Art and Design in 1961, Ducimetière earned several federal and cantonal scholarships. In 1965, he displayed his first exhibition at the Musée Rath in Geneva, which showed his first paintings and drawings. His artistic activities diversified and led him to photography, film, sculpture, murals, graphic design, installations, and performances. In the 1970s, he produced the installation L'Arbre à l'envers (Tree in heaven), which displayed a tree which appeared to be planted upside-down. In 1973, he displayed an axe in front of the Musée Rath which was called la Blessure, which he later explained encompassed the museum as a whole. In 1978, he launched a traveling exhibition titled Some flovers at..., which presented over one hundred different pieces.

Ducimietière was also active in graphic design, exhibiting at the Cabinet des Estampes in Geneva in 1982. That same year, he won a competition put forth by the City of Geneva with an exhibition titled L'Alter Ego. In 1994, he settled in London and took French nationality, changing his name to John Aldus.

He died in London on 26 January 2022 at the age of 81.
