= Zurich Art Prize =

Swiss art prize

Zurich Art Prize is a Swiss art prize that has been awarded annually by the Museum Haus Konstruktiv together with the Zurich Insurance Group, since 2007.

The award includes a cash prize (roughly $100,000 USD), and a solo exhibition in a museum. Every year, Museum Haus Konstruktiv invites six curators, critics and art experts to nominate an artist for the award and from these selected nominees a jury selects the winner.

== Previous winners ==
- 2007: Carsten Nicolai (born 1965 in Chemnitz)
- 2009: Tino Sehgal (born 1976 in London)
- 2010: Ryan Gander (born 1976 in London)
- 2011: Mai-Thu Perret (born 1976 in Geneva)
- 2012: Mariana Castillo Deball (born 1975 in Mexico)
- 2013: Adrián Villar Rojas (born 1980 in Rosario)
- 2014: Haroon Mirza (born 1977 in London)
- 2015: Latifa Echakhch (born 1974 in El Khnansa, Morocco, lives in Martigny)
- 2016: Nairy Baghramian (born 1971 in Isfahan, Iran, lives in Berlin)
- 2017: Marguerite Humeau (born 1986 in Cholet, France, lives in London)
- 2018: Robin Rhode (born 1976 in Cape Town, lives in Berlin)
- 2019: Leonor Antunes (born 1972 in Lisbon, lives in Berlin)
- 2020: Amalia Pica (born 1978 in Neuquén, Argentina, lives in London)
- 2021: Sonia Kacem (born 1985 in Geneva, lives in Amsterdam)
- 2022: Kapwani Kiwanga (born 1978 in Hamilton, Ontario, Canada, lives in Paris, France)
- 2023: Damián Ortega (born 1967 in Mexico City, lives in Berlin)
- 2024: Olaf Holzapfel
- 2025: Artur Lescher
- 2026: Rosa Barba (born in Italy)
- 2027: Kerstin Brätsch (born in 1979 in Hamburg, Germany)
