= Mariana Castillo Deball =

Mariana Castillo Deball (born in 1975, Mexico City) is a Mexican visual artist currently based in Berlin. She works primarily in installation, sculpture, photography and drawing.

== Early life and education ==
Castillo Deball studied in the Universidad Nacional Autónoma de México, Mexico City and the Jan Van Eyck Academie in Maastricht.

== Work ==
Castillo Deball uses installation, sculpture, photography, and drawing to explore the role objects play in our understanding of identity and history. Engaging in prolonged periods of research and field work, she takes on the role of the explorer or the archaeologist, compiling found materials in a way that reveals new connections and meanings. In her 2013 work Stelae Storage, plaster casts copied from monolithic Mayan stone sculptures called stelae are displayed on metal racks similar to those found in a museum's storage area. In a similar work, Lost Magic Kingdoms Paolozzi (2013), Castillo Deball culled photographic reproductions from the personal archives of late Scottish artist Eduardo Paolozzi, who mixed pop and ethnographic references. The works presented in her 2019 solo exhibition Replaying Life's Tape at the Monash University Museum of Art, Melbourne, derive from the Ediacaran fossils from the Ediacara Hills, South Australia. Incorporating methods of scientific display systems into her prints and installations, Castillo Deball considers the contested relationship between time, site, and history.

=== Permanent installations ===
Castillo Deball has created four landscape-focused collages for the concourse level of Metro’s Wilshire/La Cienega station.

== Exhibitions ==
Castillo Deball has been included in solo and group exhibitions in Europe and North America including the 2015 solo exhibition ¿Quién medirá el espacio, quién me dirá el momento? at the Museo de Arte Contemporáneo (MACO) in Oaxaca, the 54th Biennale di Venezia, Sharjah Biennial 12, Sharjah, United Arab Emirates, and in dOCUMENTA, Kassel, Germany. Castillo Deball's monograph and artist's book, Uncomfortable Objects, was published in 2012.

== Other activities ==
In 2022, Castillo Deball was a member of the visual arts jury for the annual DAAD Artists-in-Berlin Program.

== Recognition ==
In 2009, Castillo Deball was awarded the Ars Viva prize, which has been presented by the Kulturkreis der deutschen Wirtschaft im BDI (Association of Arts and Culture of the German Economy at the Federation of German Industries) every year since 1953, and is awarded to young visual artists who live and work in Germany.

In 2012, Castillo Deball was awarded the Zurich Art Prize.
