= Charles Mayton =

American painter

Charles Mayton (born 1974, Florida) is a New York-based painter. His work combines painterly abstraction with the iconography of digital media. Mayton's visual strategies of appropriation and détournement have been compared to the appropriation art of the Pictures Generation.

== Early life and career ==
Mayton was born in 1974 in Florida. He studied at the Ringling College of Art and Design, and received his Masters of Fine Arts from Milton Avery School of the Arts at Bard College in 2007.

== Work ==
Mayton mimics the digital aesthetics of off-register printing, computer-aided design, and social media graphics by hand. These graphics are often juxtaposed with brushy color fields.

Punctuation symbols also occasion Mayton's work, especially question- and quotation marks. Mayton "quotes" the motifs, palettes, and titles of canonical painters such as Belgian surrealist René Magritte.

His first solo show, The Difficult Crossing, held at Balice Hertling & Lewis in 2011, was titled after an eponymous painting by Magritte, depicting an artist's studio. Mayton's show recreated the mise-en-scène of Magritte's painting with several large-scale paintings; a coat rack; citrus fruits scattered across the gallery floor, referring to the surrealists’ obsession with fruit; and a doormat printed with the title of the show.

== Exhibitions ==
Charles Mayton has held solo exhibitions at David Lewis, New York (2016); American Academy in Rome, Italy, and Thomas Duncan Gallery, Los Angeles (both 2015); Campoli Presti, Paris (2014); The Power Station, Dallas (2013); Balice Hertling, Paris (2012); and Balice Hertling & Lewis, New York (2011), among others.

His work has been shown in group exhibitions at VAVA, Milan (2015); Thomas Dane, London (2014); Walker Art Center, Minneapolis (2013); SculptureCenter in Long Island City, New York (2011); and White Columns, New York (2010).
