= The Power Station (art space) =

Contemporary art space in Exposition Park, Dallas

Coordinates: 32.7845°N 96.7712°W

- Established: 2011
- Location: Dallas, Texas
- Type: Not-for-profit contemporary art space
- Director: Rob Teeters (artistic director)
- Website: powerstationdallas.com

The Power Station is a not-for-profit contemporary art space in Exposition Park, Dallas. It is housed in a former Dallas Power & Light building which was constructed in 1920, and hosts large scale exhibitions which complement the building's raw architecture. For each of its international exhibitions, The Power Station works with the artists to produce a publication in conjunction with their project. Its programming also includes a summer exhibition and additional events each year. The building includes an apartment where artists can live as they create and build their installations. "The building and garden relate to one another gently through the careful manipulation of crisp architectural elements that are then intentionally eroded by more informal, lush plant material."

== History ==
The Power Station was founded by Janelle and Alden Pinnell in 2011. The first exhibitor was American artist Oscar Tuazon.

== Publications ==
The Power Station produces a publication in conjunction with each of its international exhibitions, and prints a first edition of 1000 copies. For the Drip Event exhibit, they also produced Solar Lice, a double LP by Tobias Madison, Emanuel Rossetti, and Stefan Tcherepnin, recorded at Issue Project Room by the band formed for the exhibit.

== Summer program ==
The Power Station runs a summer program of research, discussions and displays about art and culture. Past programming has included Four Nights, Four Decades: A Survey of Video Art from the 1970s to the 2000s, which screened works presented by four experts over four nights, and Amarillo Entropy, an exhibition of artworks, artifacts, ephemera, screenings, and discussions, with Amarillo, Texas, at its center.

== Exhibitions ==
- Fredrik Værslev, East Bound and Down (2014)
- Michael E. Smith (2014)
- Walead Beshty, Fair Use (2013)
- Amarillo Entropy (2013)
- Tobias Madison, Emmanuel Rossetti, and Stefan Tcherepnin, Drip Event (2013)
- Charles Mayton, Two-Step (2013)
- Nikolas Gambaroff, I Am Real Estate (2012)
- Four Nights, Four Decades (2012)
- Jacob Kassay, No Goal (2012)
- Virginia Overton, Deluxe (2012)
- Matias Faldbakken, Oslo, Texas (2011)
- Oscar Tuazon, Die (2011)
