= Adele Röder =

German painter

- Born: 1980; Dresden, East Germany (now Saxony, Germany)
- Citizenship: German citizenship
- Known for: painting, installation art

Adele Röder or Adele Roder (born 1980 in Dresden) is a German painter. She and fellow artist Kerstin Brätsch form the duo DAS INSTITUT. Röder's work is included in the collection of the Museum of Modern Art, New York. Röder's work has been exhibited at Haus der Kunst, Munich and at the Museum of Contemporary Art, Los Angeles and the Museum of Contemporary Art Chicago as part of DAS INSTITUT.
