= Kerstin Brätsch =

German visual artist

- Born: 1979 (age 46–47)
- Known for: Painter

Kerstin Brätsch (born 1979) is a German contemporary visual artist. She is primarily known as a painter, also making work collaboratively as DAS INSTITUT (with artist Adele Röder) and KAYA (with artist Debo Eilers). She currently lives and works in New York City.

== Early life and education ==
Brätsch was born in 1979 in Hamburg, Germany. She received a master's degree in fine arts from Columbia University in New York City.

== Career ==
Blocked Radiant (for Ioana) (2011) at the Museum of Modern Art in 2022

Brätsch is a painter, who often creates large-scale, highly abstract works that combine multiple medias. Though Brätsch's abstract works might visually call to mind artists such as Vasilly Kandinsky, she bucks against tradition in the unusual display of her works. For instance, her paintings have been hung by magnets, draped, and framed in between sheets of glass and then leaned against the wall, which combines an element of exhibition display and performance to her artistic practice.

Brätsch is also known for working quickly and producing large quantities of work. In 2007 Brätsch formed DAS INSTITUT with fellow artist Adele Röder. Using a traditional import and export agency as a model, DAS INSTITUT seeks to examine how images are disseminated, exchanged, and produced in today's world. These collaborations often produce work that combines Brätsch's paintings with Röder's digital projections, posters, and advertisements. Though Brätsch and Röder are the primary artists involved, DAS INSTITUT also collaborates with other artists.

Her other frequent collaborator is sculptor Debo Eilers, with whom she makes work as KAYA. This alter-ego is "an ongoing project with their muse and collaborator Kaya, a teen girl who is the daughter of one of Eilers's childhood friends from Texas. Brätsch and Eilers have been working with Kaya since she was 14, in the process encouraging her to develop as an artist herself.

In 2024, Brätsch was among the 18 artists selected by the Port Authority of New York and New Jersey to create installations for John F. Kennedy International Airport’s new Terminal 6, set to open in 2026.

== Works of KAYA ==
These works are currently on display in the exhibition „Shifting the Silence“, Lenbachhaus, Munich (2025–27)

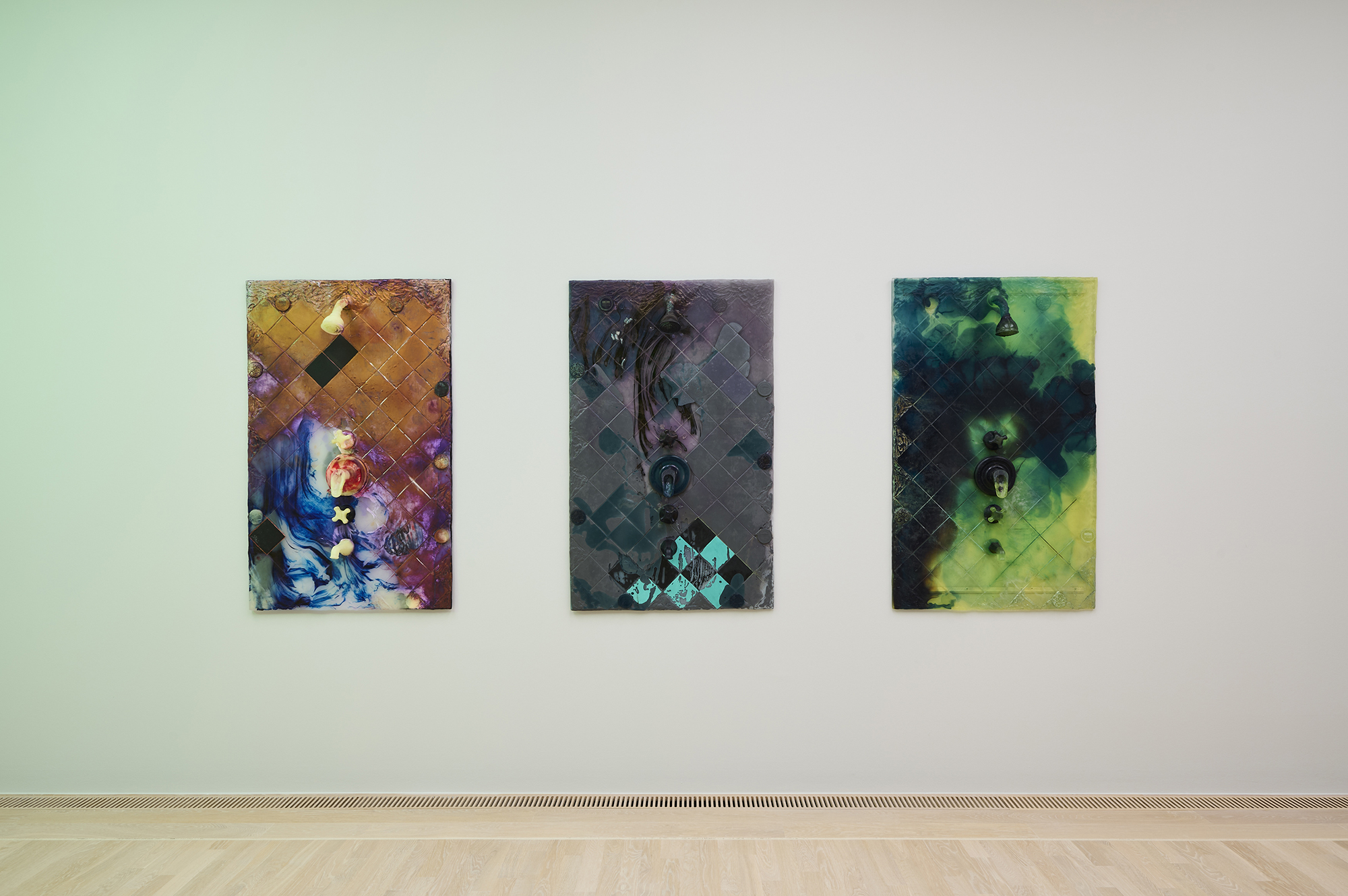
UNIT3D [Devimport], UNIT3D [DDebarma], UNIT 3D [Lava] (2017)

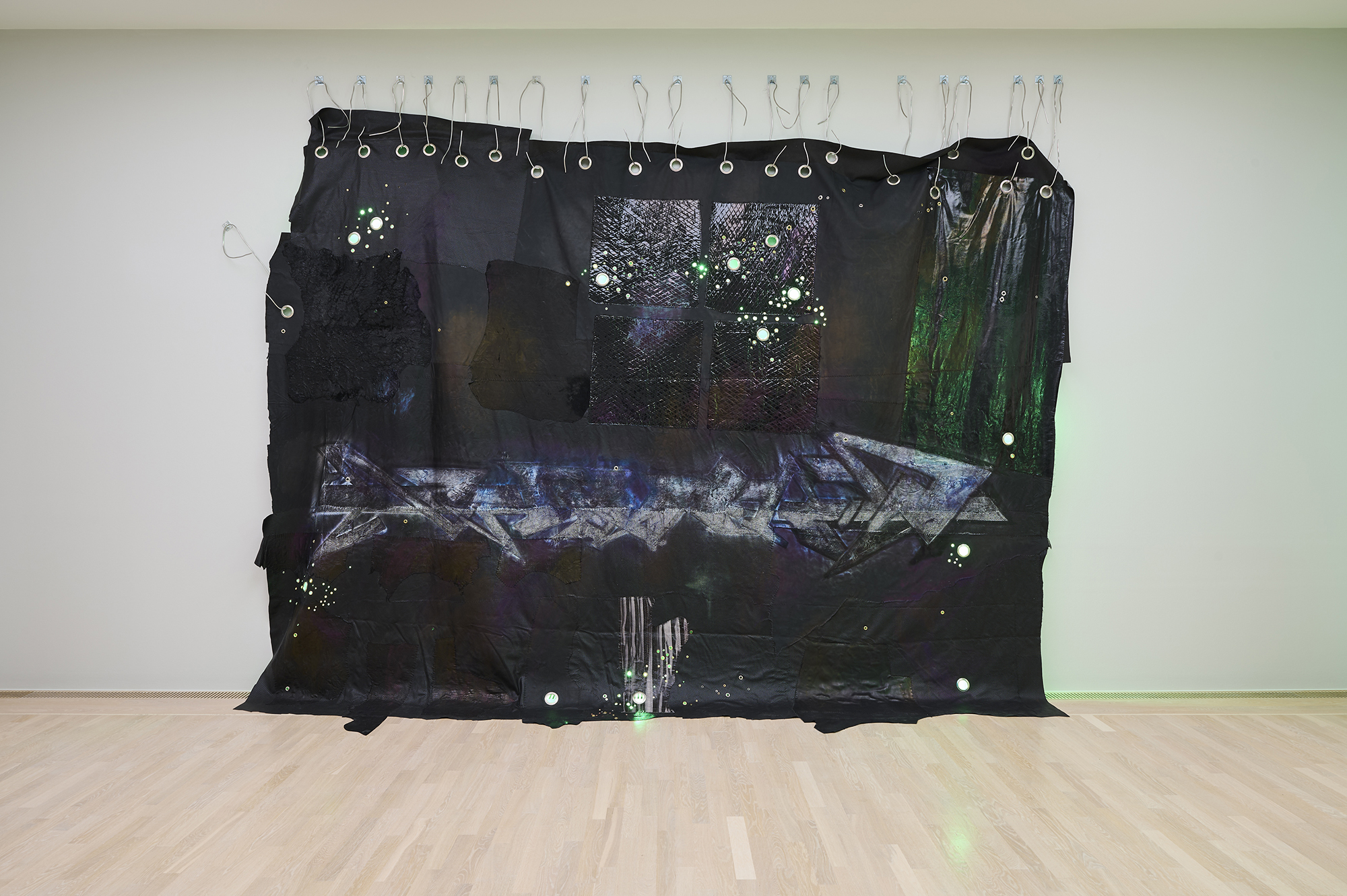
N.O.Madski Wall (2017)

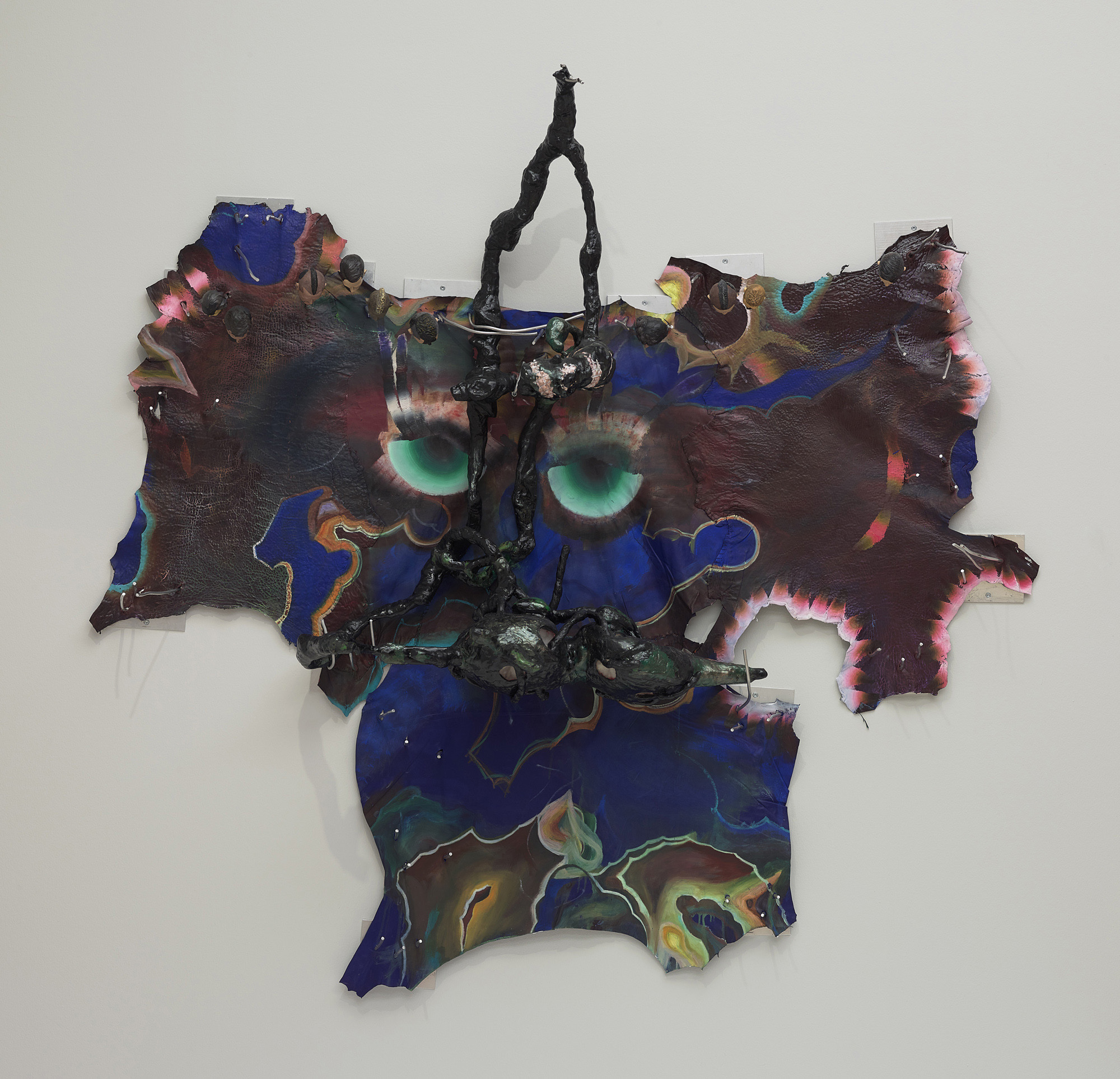
KAYA Pelle / Teste di calcio (2018)

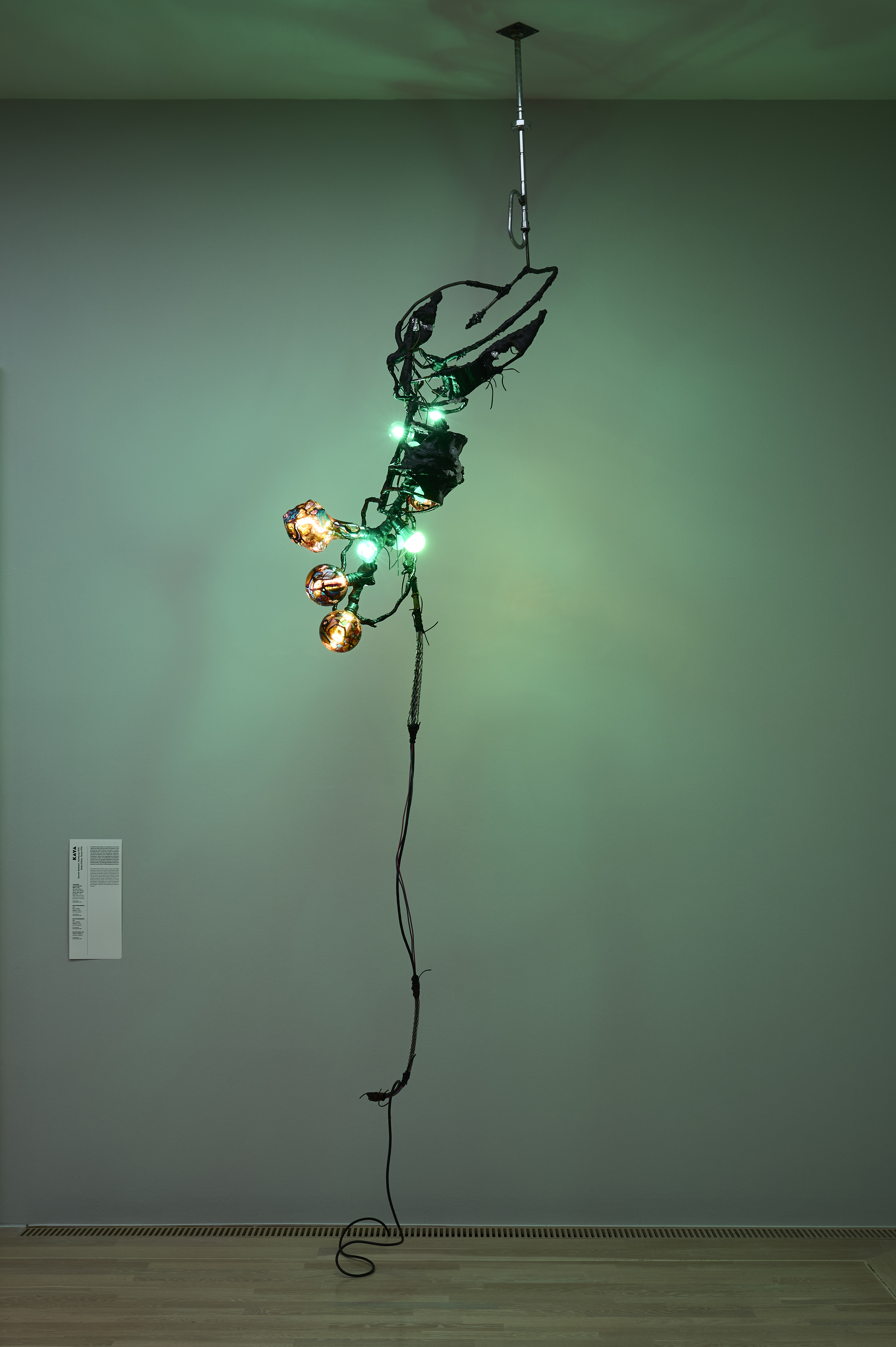
Catacomb lamp Hamilton Beach (2022)

== Recognition ==
In 2014, Brätsch was awarded the August Macke Prize.

In 2017, Brätsch was awarded the second edition of the Edvard Munch Art Award, which constituted a cash prize and a solo exhibition at the Munch Museum in 2019.

In 2027, Brätsch will receive the Zurich Art Prize, which comes with a cash prize of 130,000 Swiss francs and a solo exhibition in june of 2027 at the Haus Konstruktiv in Zurich.

== Art market ==
Brätsch has been represented by Gladstone Gallery since 2020. She is also represented by Gió Marconi, Milan, and she previously worked with Gavin Brown's Enterprise.

== Major exhibitions ==
- D I WHY? at the Swiss Institute Contemporary Art New York (19 September 2009 - 31 October 2009)
- The Forever Now: Contemporary Painting in an Atemporal World at the Museum of Modern Art (6 December 2014 - 5 April 2015)
- NO MAN'S LAND at the Rubell Family Collection (2 December 2015 - 28 May 2016)
- DAS INSTITUT at the Serpentine Galleries (3 March 2016 - 15 May 2016)
- Kerstin Brätsch: Innovation at Museum Brandhorst (25 May 2017 - 17 September 2017)
- Die Sein: Para Psychics at Ludwig Forum für Internationale Kunst (24 September 2022 - 26 February 2023)
- MƎTAATEM at Munch Museum (14 March 2025 - 03 August 2025)
- Shifting the Silence at Lenbachhaus (14 October 2025 – 3. January 2027)

=== Public collections ===
- Museum of Modern Art

== See also ==
- List of German women artists
