= Francine-Charlotte Gehri =

Swiss writer (1923–2022)

- Born: 31 May 1923; Lausanne, Switzerland
- Died: 14 February 2022 (aged 98)
- Occupation: Writer

Francine-Charlotte Gehri (31 May 1923 – 14 February 2022) was a Swiss writer.

== Biography ==
After her studies in business, Gehri worked as a secretary and a teacher for many years. A cultural activist, she set up three writers' festivals in the Lake Geneva area in the municipalities of Montreux and La Tour-de-Peilz. For ten years, she worked alongside Janine Massard as organizer of the Rendez-vous littéraires du quinze du café romand (The Literary Rendezvous of the Fifteenth at Cafe Romand) in Lausanne. She also coordinated other writers' festivals in Fribourg, Sion, Geneva, and Yverdon-les-Bains.

Gehri served as President of the Association vaudoise des écrivains for six years. She represented Romandy at the Académie des Provinces Françaises. As a writer, she wrote several short stories, such as Histoires sans point d'orgue and La vie en mieux. She also wrote one novel, titled Le Chemin de l'Espagne.

Gehri was a recipient of multiple literary awards. She won the Prix Paul Budry, the 1978 Œuvre suisse des lectures pour la jeunesse, the 1993 Prix Guy de Maupassant, and the 1994 Prix des Ecrivains vaudois.

Gehri died on 14 February 2022, at the age of 98.
