= Marcel Rémy =

Swiss mountaineer and rock climber (1923–2022)

- Born: 6 February 1923; Gruyère District, Switzerland
- Died: 10 July 2022 (aged 99)
- Occupations: Mountaineer, rock climber

Marcel Rémy (6 February 1923 – 10 July 2022) was a Swiss amateur mountaineer and rock climber. He was well known for his achievements in rock climbing.

== Biography ==
The son of François and Bertha Rémy, Marcel was born in the Gruyère District on 6 February 1923. His father was a farmer and a lumberjack before he became a railway worker. He began working as a farmer at a young age. At the age of eight, he discovered mountaineering from contact with tourists. He taught a number of courses in the Vaud Alps and the Fribourg Prealps, as well as the iconic Matterhorn, Grand Combin, and Mont Blanc. Passionate about mountaineering, he introduced many people to the practice, such as his sons, Claude and Yves, who themselves became high-level sport climbers.

In 2017, at the age of 94, Rémy climbed the Miroir d'Argentine, a 450-meter cliff in the Vaud Alps, accompanied by his two sons. Despite medical operations and two prosthetic hips, he continued to train daily. In 2019, he climbed La guêpe. In 2022, at the age of 99, he lead-climbed a 4c route on a 16-meter indoor rock wall.

Marcel Rémy died in his sleep at home on 10 July 2022 at the age of 99.
