= Mathias Feldges =

Swiss politician (1937–2022)

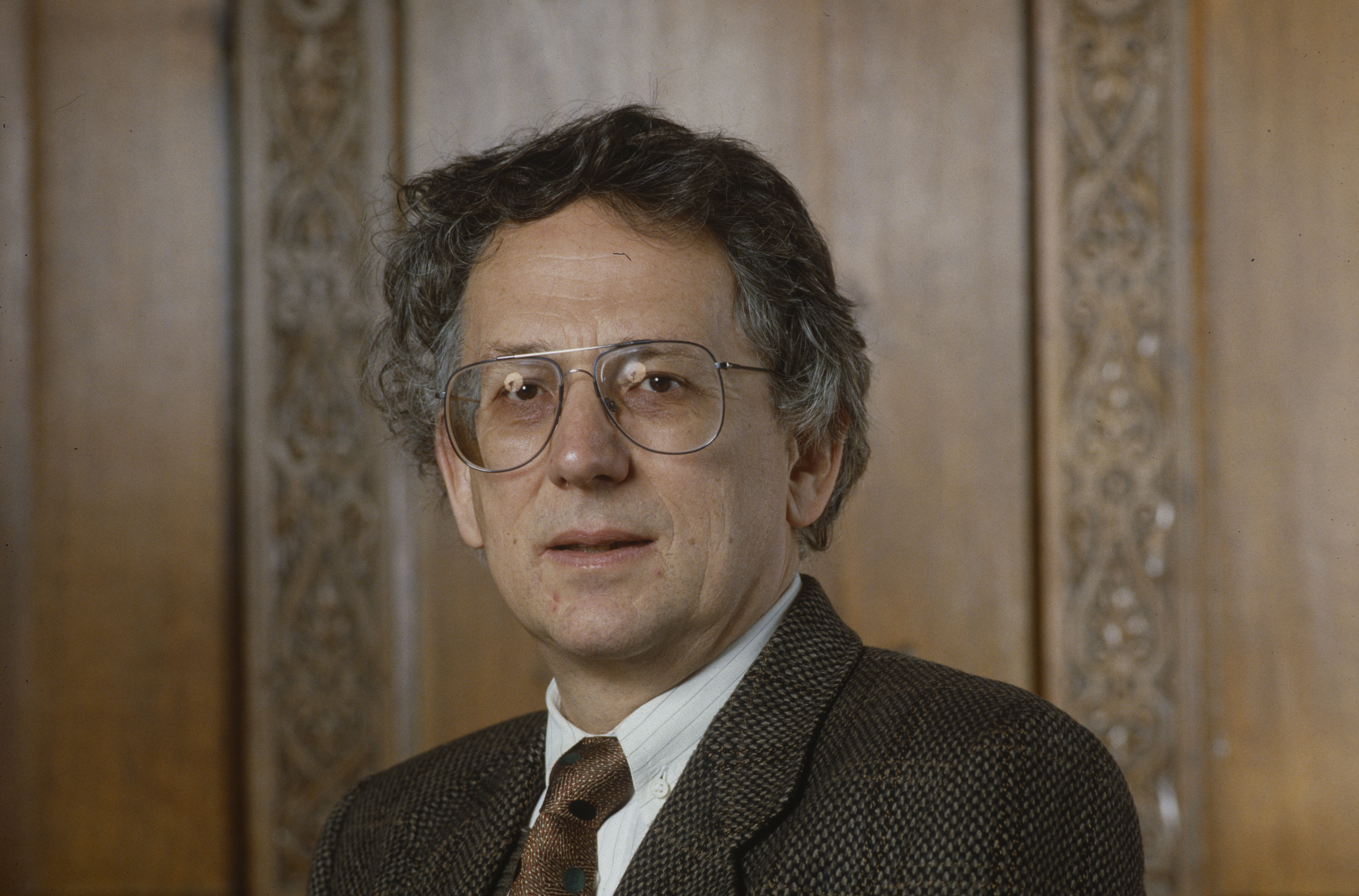
- Feldges in 1992

Member of the Executive Council of Basel-Stadt
- In office 1984–1997

Personal details
- Born: 10 August 1937 Oberbipp, Switzerland
- Died: 17 September 2022 (aged 85)
- Party: SP
- Education: University of Basel

Mathias Feldges (10 August 1937 – 17 September 2022) was a Swiss politician. A member of the Social Democratic Party of Switzerland, he served on the Executive Council of Basel-Stadt from 1984 to 1997.

Feldges died on 17 September 2022, at the age of 85.
