= Emanuel Hurwitz (politician) =

Swiss psychoanalyst and politician (1935–2022)

Member of the Cantonal Council of Zürich
- In office 1979–1984

Personal details
- Born: 21 February 1935
- Died: 5 February 2022 (aged 86)
- Party: SP
- Occupation: Psychoanalyst

Emanuel Hurwitz (21 February 1935 – 5 February 2022) was a Swiss psychoanalyst and politician.

A member of the Social Democratic Party of Switzerland, he served in the Cantonal Council of Zürich from 1979 to 1984. On May 1, 1984, Hurwitz resigned from the Zürich parliament and the Social Democratic Party in protest against perceived antisemitism and anti-Zionism within the SDP. He died on 5 February 2022, at the age of 86.
