= Pierre Naftule =

Swiss writer and theatre director (1960–2022)

- Born: 5 December 1960; Versoix, Switzerland
- Died: 19 March 2022 (aged 61); Geneva, Switzerland
- Occupations: Writer theatre director

Pierre Philippe Naftule (5 December 1960 – 19 March 2022) was a Swiss writer, producer and theatre director.

== Biography ==
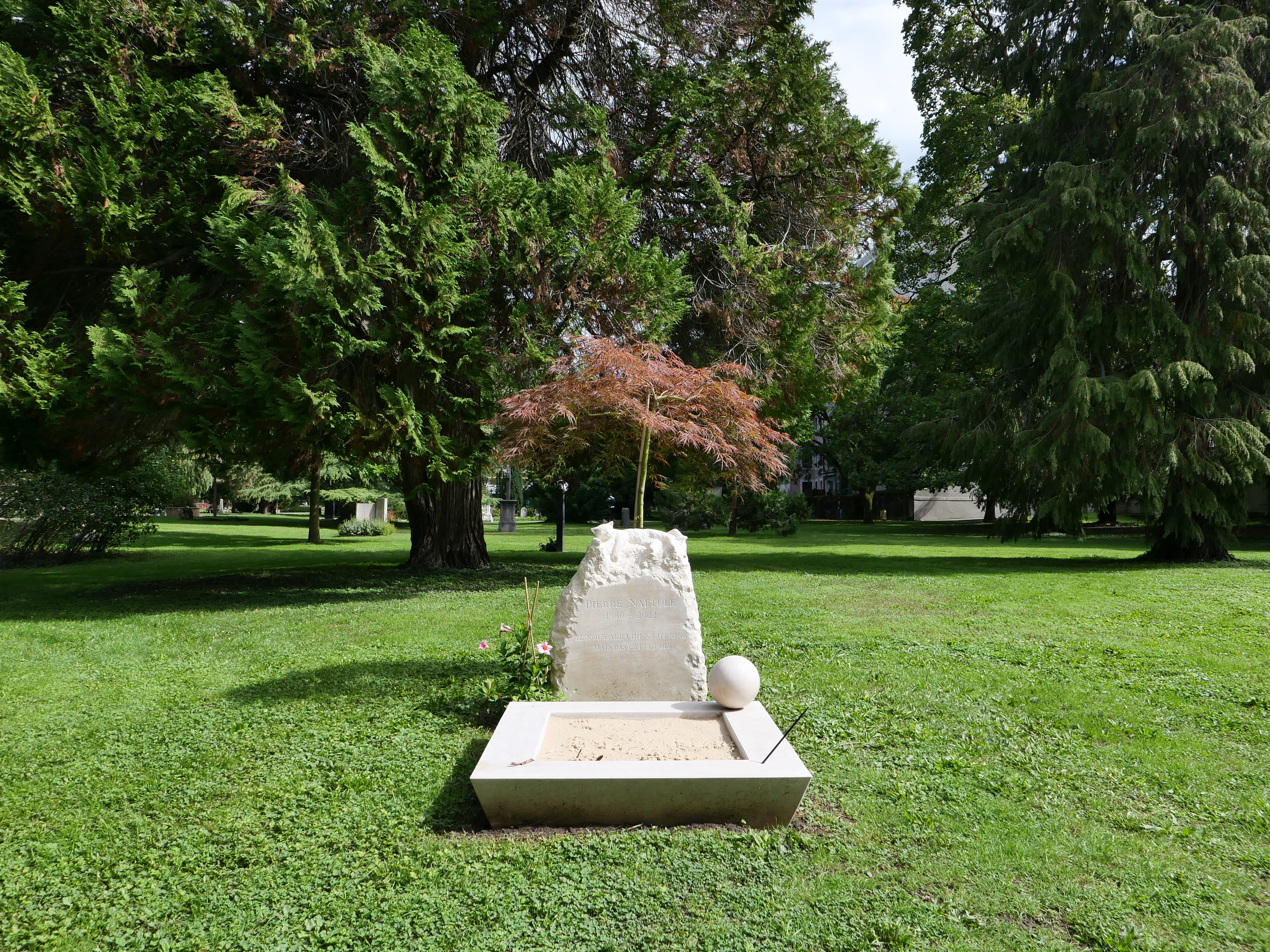
Naftule's grave at the Cimetière des Rois in Geneva. The tombstone bears the inscription: « IL NOUS AURA BIEN FAIT RIRE, MAIS PAS CETTE FOIS. » ("HE WOULD HAVE MADE US LAUGH, BUT NOT THIS TIME.")

Naftule was descended from Romanian ancestry. He became well known to French-speaking audiences during his time on the game show La Course autour du monde, broadcast on Antenne 2. When he returned to Switzerland, he staged three shows alongside his friend Pascal Bernheim: Le Père Noël est une ordure, Topaze, and Les dix petits nègres. After creating his own stage production studio, he took over as director of Revue genevoise until 1995. Alongside Thierry Meury and Bernheim, he led Revue genevoise two more times.

In 1995, Naftule founded the show production company Yaka Production SA alongside Alain Monnet and Gérard Mermet. He created the character Marie-Thérèse Poget née Bertholet for Revue genevoise with Joseph Gorgoni, which became Marie-Thérèse Porchet. The character's first show, La truie est en moi was produced in 1996. He also collaborated with Laurent Deshusses and worked alongside Yann Lambiel. He was the agent of Thomas Wiesel. In 2018, he co-founded the Nouvelle revue de Lausanne.

During the 2010s, Naftule suffered from amyotrophic lateral sclerosis. He died in Geneva on 19 March 2022 at the age of 61.
