= J. Alexander Baumann =

Swiss politician (1942–2022)

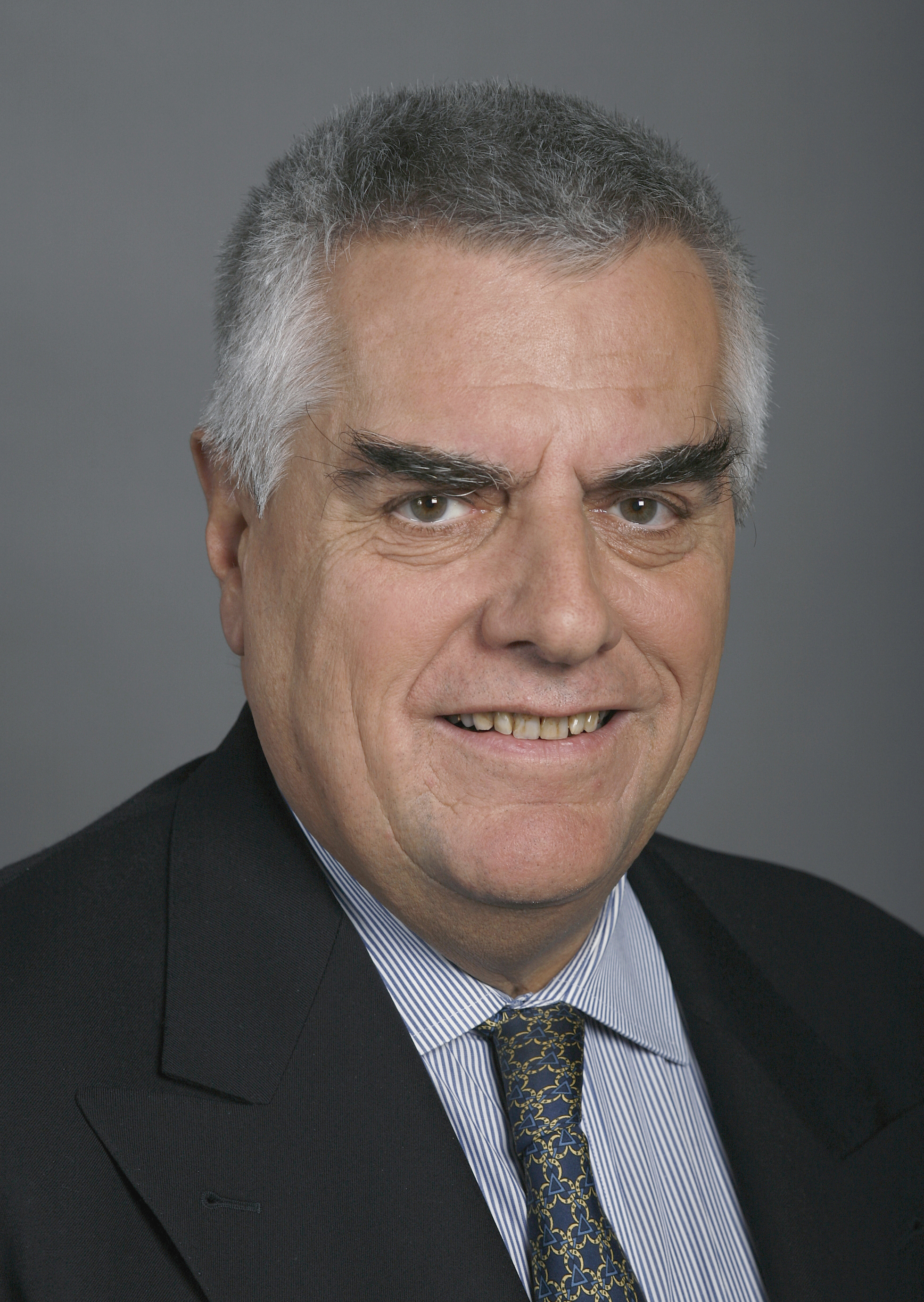
- Baumann in 2007

Member of the National Council of Switzerland
- In office 4 December 1995 – 4 December 2011
- Constituency: Thurgau

Member of the Grand Council of Thurgau
- In office May 1988 – December 1995

Personal details
- Born: 10 December 1942 Zürich, Switzerland
- Died: 2 February 2022 (aged 79) Davos, Switzerland
- Party: SVP

J. Alexander Baumann (10 December 1942 – 2 February 2022) was a Swiss politician. A member of the Swiss People's Party, he served in the National Council from 1995 to 2011.

== Biography ==
Baumann was born in Zürich in 1942. He grew up in Flüelen in the Canton of Uri. He was a lawyer by profession and served as a lieutenant-colonel in the Swiss Armed Forces.

He served as the Member of the Grand Council of Thurgau from 1988 to 1995. He then represented Thurgau in the National Council from 1995 to 2011. During his mandate, he served in the Parliamentary Committee for Legal Affairs, the Judicial Commission of the Federal Assembly, and the Business Audit Committee.

Baumann died from a heart attack in Davos, on 2 February 2022, at the age of 79.
