= Georges Athanasiadès =

Swiss organist and choirmaster (1929–2022)

- Born: 27 July 1929; Lavey-les-Bains, Switzerland
- Died: 3 February 2022 (aged 92); Saint-Maurice, Switzerland
- Education: Lycée-collège de l'Abbaye de Saint-Maurice
- Occupations: Organist; Choirmaster

Georges Athanasiadès (27 July 1929 – 3 February 2022) was a Swiss organist and choirmaster.

== Biography ==
Athanasiadès was born to an Italian mother and a Greek father in Saint-Ursanne (Jura) . He studied theology at the Lycée-collège de l'Abbaye de Saint-Maurice and later studied German literature and musicology in Heidelberg and Freiburg im Breisgau. He returned to Switzerland to study music in Lausanne and earned a high distinction on the pipe organ.

In 1952, Athanasiadès was ordained a priest at the Abbey of Saint-Maurice d'Agaune and became a teacher of German and Greek literature. He was also the abbey's organist. He participated in multiple concert tours across Europe, North America, Japan, Africa, and China. He made numerous recordings and participated in multiple international competitions. In 2001, he founded the Concours international pour orgue de Saint-Maurice.

Athanasiadès's discography included many recorded works by great composers such as Franz Liszt, Johannes Brahms, César Franck, Johann Sebastian Bach, and other Baroque composers. He was also an expert in liturgical texts and represented Switzerland in the French-speaking translation commission at the Second Vatican Council.

He died in Saint-Maurice on 3 February 2022, at the age of 92.

== Bibliography ==
- Wer singt, betet doppelt (2009)
- Mysterium Salutis
- Initiation à la musique par le disque
- Josef Krips, pas de musique sans amour (1999)
