= Heinz Allenspach =

Swiss editor and politician (1928–2022)

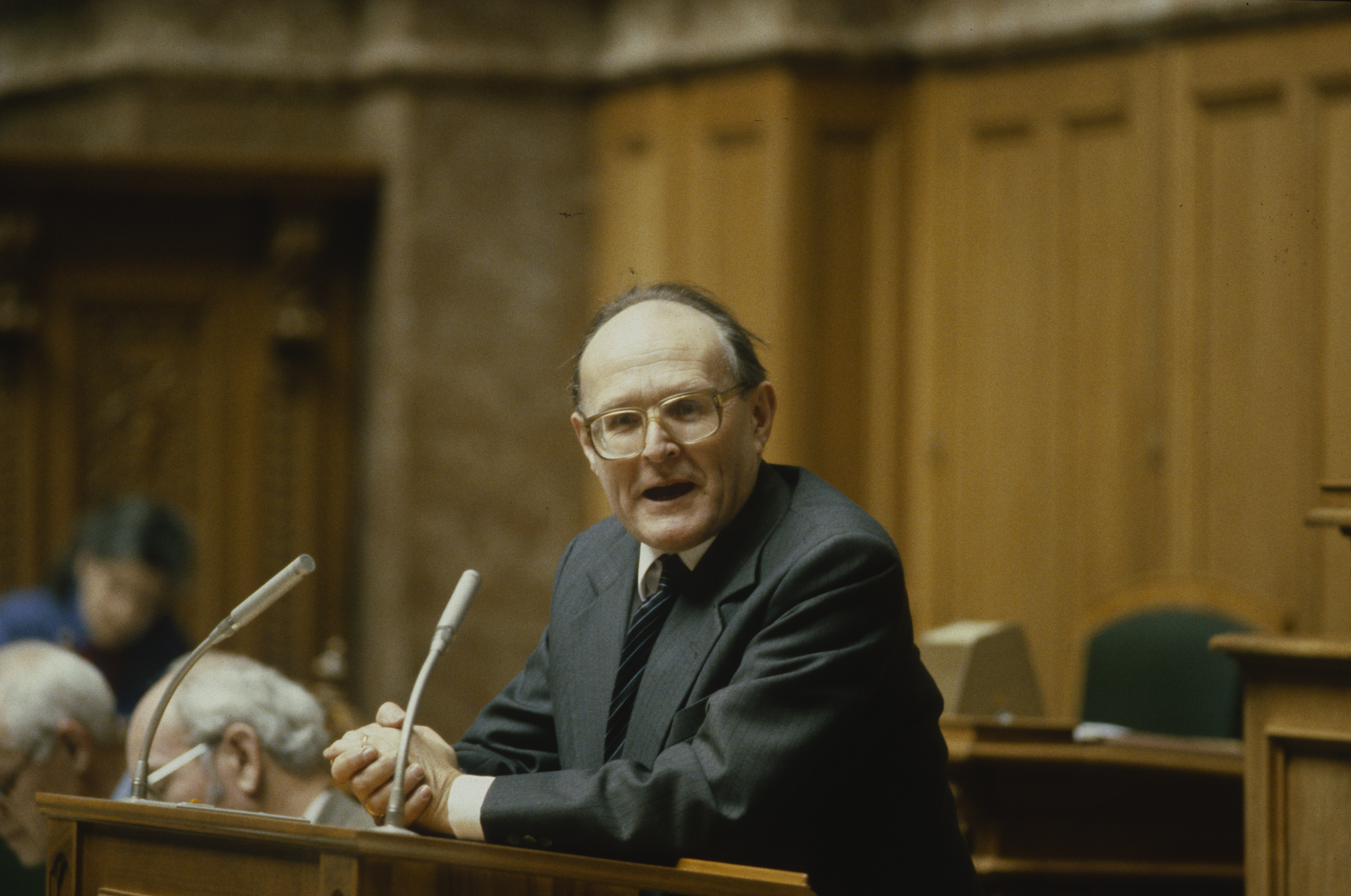
- Allenspach in 1985

Member of the Swiss National Council
- In office 26 November 1979 – 3 December 1995

Member of the Cantonal Council of Zürich
- In office 1975–1980

Personal details
- Born: 22 February 1928 St. Gallen, Switzerland
- Died: 16 September 2022 (aged 94)
- Party: FDP
- Education: University of St. Gallen
- Occupation: Editor

Heinz Allenspach (22 February 1928 – 16 September 2022) was a Swiss editor and politician. A member of the Free Democratic Party of Switzerland, he served in the National Council from 1979 to 1995.

Allenspach died on 16 September 2022, at the age of 94.
