= Alice Pauli =

Swiss gallery owner, sculptor, and artist (1922–2022)

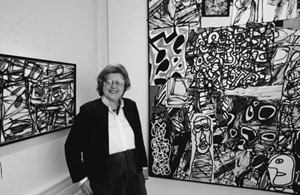
Pauli in 2010

Alice Pauli (13 January 1922 – 15 July 2022) was a Swiss gallery owner, sculptor, and visual artist.

Pauli opened the Galerie Alice Pauli in Switzerland in 1962 and focused on contemporary art. The Gallery's mission was "to be carriers of images, messengers between human creation and the public."
