= Laurence Boissier =

Swiss writer and artist (1965–2022)

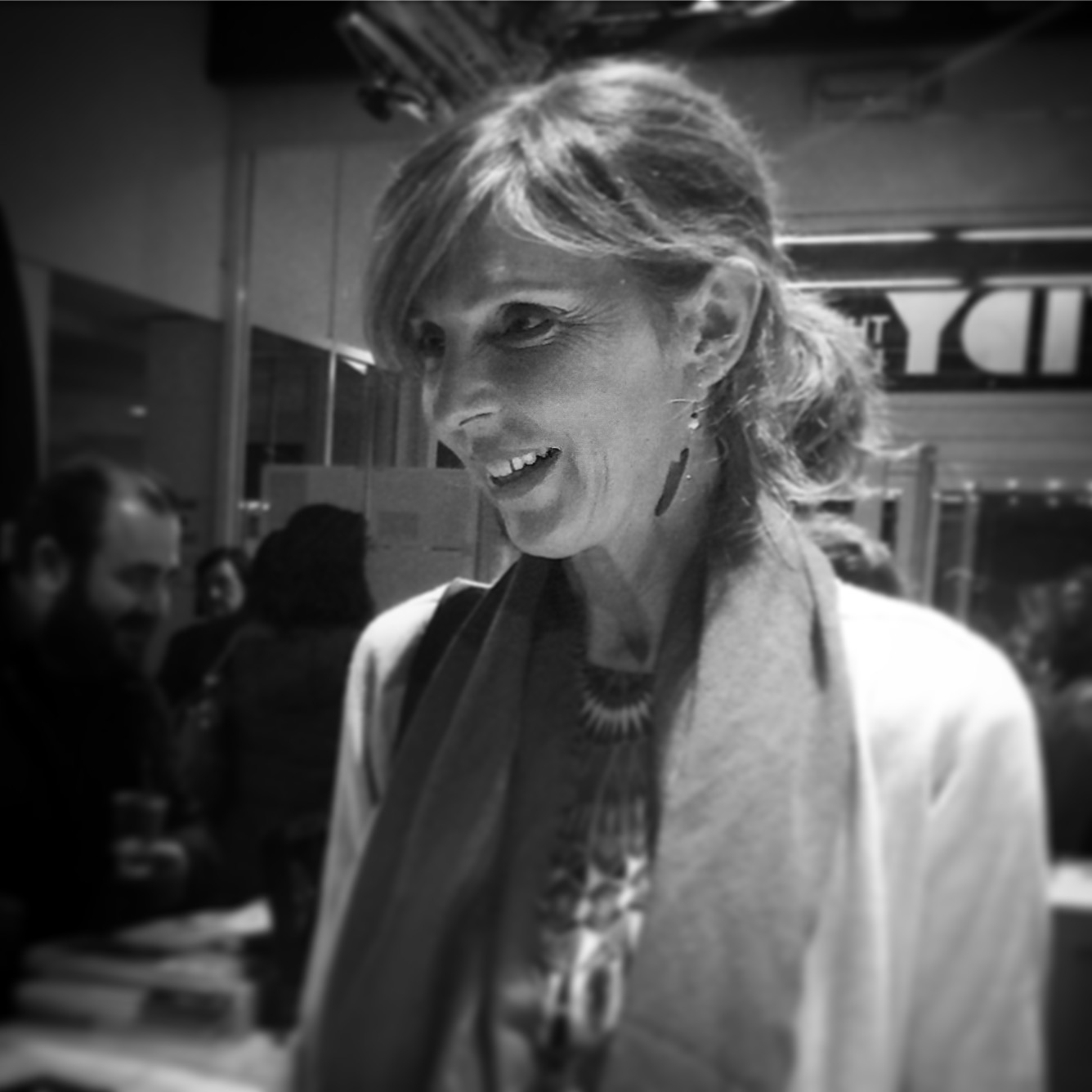
- Boissier in 2018
- Born: 12 August 1965; Geneva, Switzerland
- Died: 7 January 2022 (aged 56)
- Occupations: Writer; Artist

Laurence Boissier (12 August 1965 – 7 January 2022) was a Swiss writer, artist, and architect.

== Biography ==
Boissier studied architectural engineering at the École des arts décoratifs de Genève. For two years, she worked for the International Committee of the Red Cross, visiting prisons in Serbia and South Africa. For ten years, she worked for the Canton of Geneva as an engineer in building physics.

She then studied at the Geneva University of Art and Design and earned an art degree in 2009. She wrote several collections of texts and a novel on non-conformity. In 2011, she joined Bern ist überall, a group of German- and French-language Swiss writers. In 2017, she received a Swiss Literature Award.

Boissier died on 7 January 2022, at the age of 56.

== Publications ==
- Projet de salon pour Madame B. (2010)
- Noces (2010)
- Cahier des charges (2011)
- Inventaire des lieux (2015)
- Le maillot de bain orange (2016)
- Inventaire des lieux (2017)
- Rentrée des classes (2017)
- Safari (2019)
- Histoire d'un soulèvement (2020)

== Distinctions ==
- New author grant from the Canton of Geneva (2009)
- Prix Studer/Ganz (2009)
- Swiss Literature Award (2017)
- Prix des lecteurs de la Ville de Lausanne (2018)
- Prix Pittard de l'Andelyn (2018)
