= Geneva University of Art and Design =

Art school in Geneva, Switzerland

- Haute École d'art et de Design Genève (HEAD)
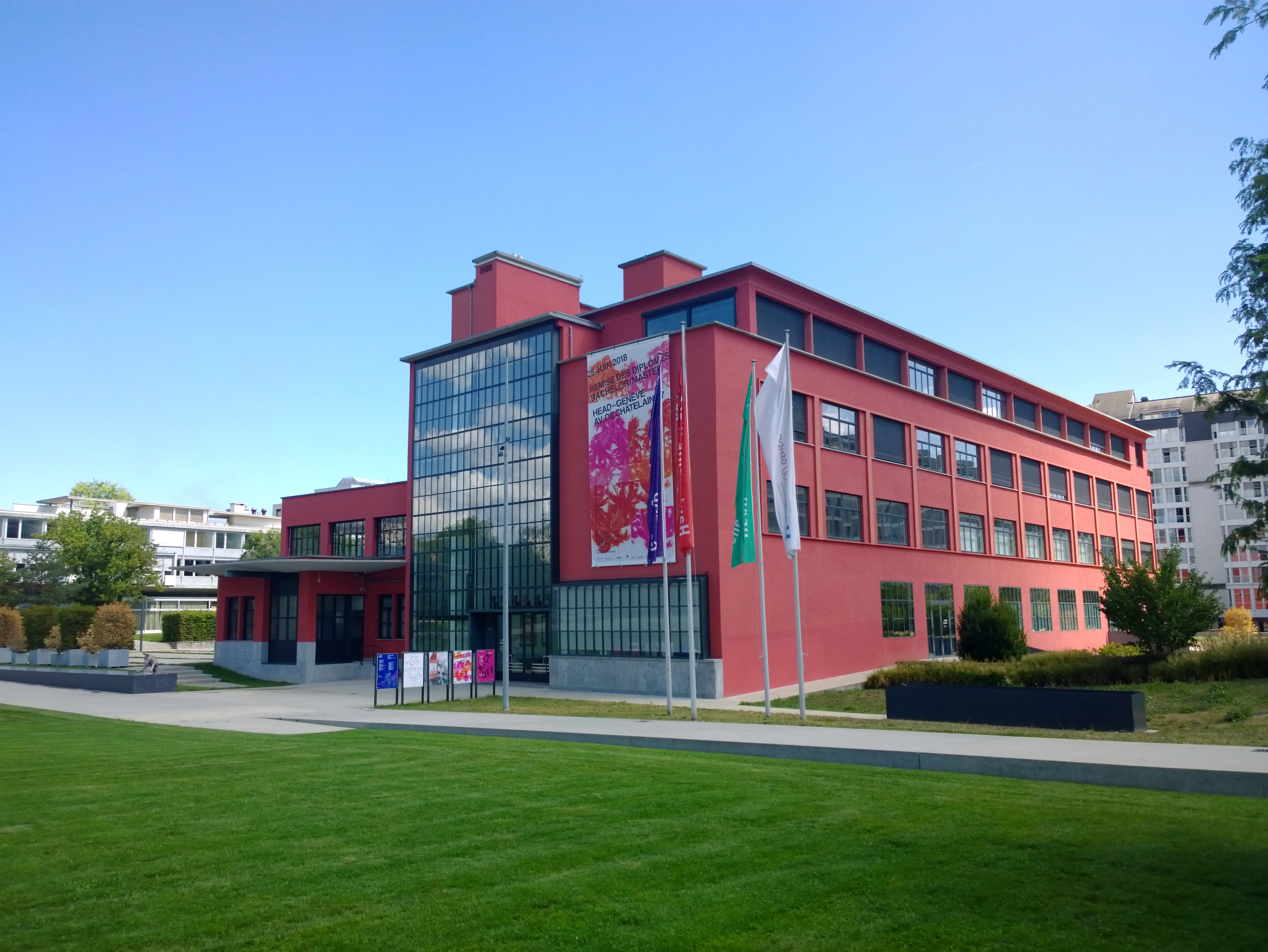

Location
- 1203 Genève, Switzerland
- 46.2089°N 6.14132°E

Information
- Other name: HEAD Genève
- Former names: École Supérieure des Beaux-Arts, Haute École d'Arts Appliqués
- Established: 2006
- Director: Jean-Pierre Greff
- Website: https://www.hesge.ch/

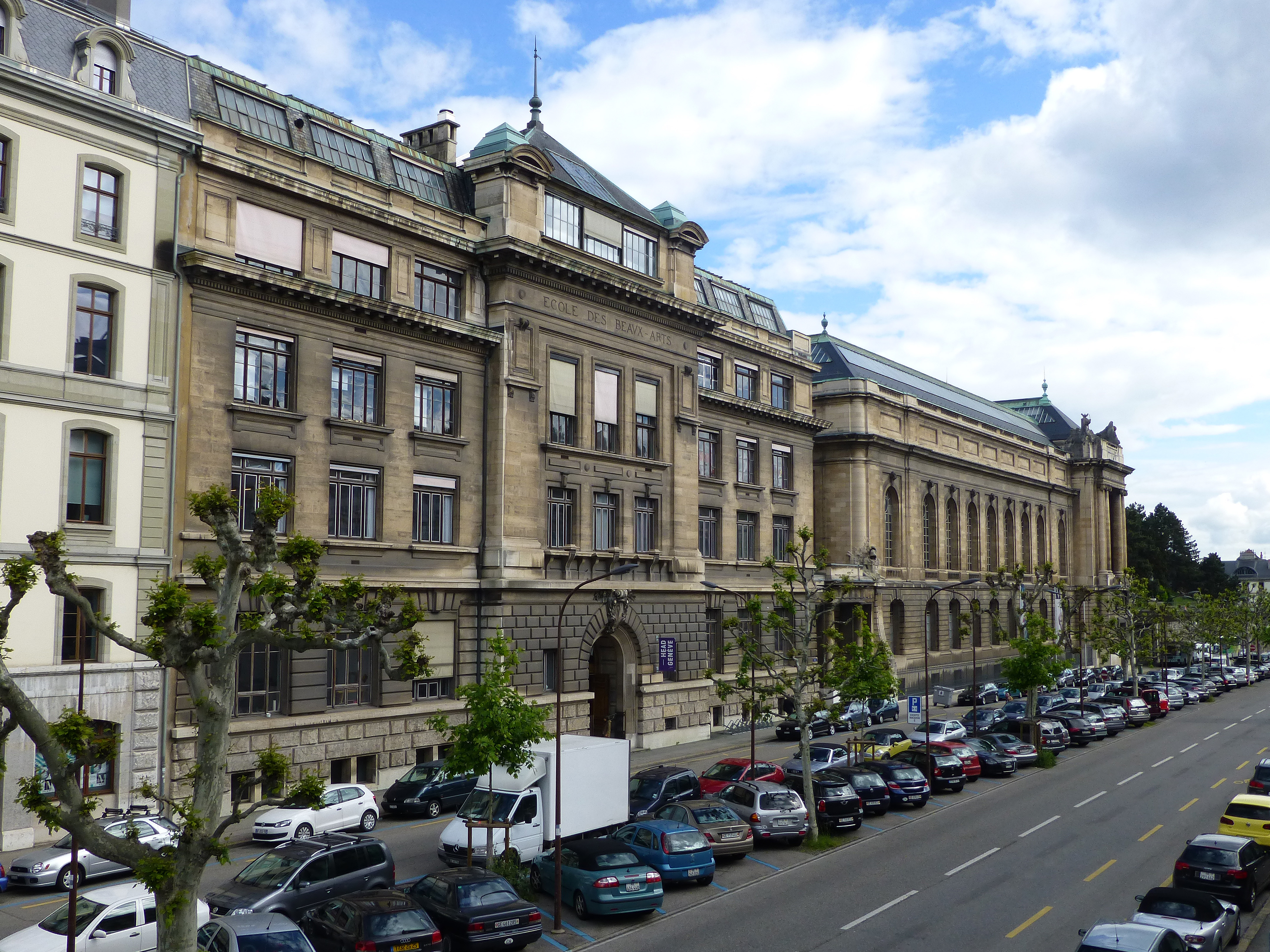
Part of the HEAD campus at Helvétique 9; the former campus of École Supérieure des Beaux-Arts

Geneva University of Art and Design (HEAD) (French: Haute École d'art et de Design Genève) is a European art and design school founded in 2006, and belonging to the network of the University of Applied Sciences and Arts of Western Switzerland.

== History ==
HEAD was formed in 2006 from the merger of two older Swiss art schools, the École Supérieure des Beaux-Arts, and the Haute École d'Arts Appliqués. The École Supérieure des Beaux-Arts was founded in 1748 by the Conseil des Deux-Cents under the name École de Dessein. The Haute École d'Arts Appliqués was founded on October 4, 1869 under the name l’École d’Art Appliqué à l’Industrie.'

== About ==
The school offers coursework at the Bachelors and Masters levels. Areas of study include Visual Arts, Cinema, Interior Design, Graphic Design, Fashion and Accessory Design, and Media Design. However the school is best known for their fashion programs. Since 2017, the campus occupies more than 16,000 m2 in area.

== Campus buildings ==
- Building at Boulevard Helvétique 9, used since 2006 by the visual arts section
- Building at Rue Général Dufour 2, used since 2006 by the cinema section
- Building at Rue de l'Encyclopédie 5, used since 2006 by the visual communication section
- Pavillon Prairie at Rue de Lyon 22, used from 2006 to 2016 by the interior design section
- Building H, Avenue de Châtelaine 7, used since 2017
- Building E, Avenue de Châtelaine 5, used since 2017
- Building A, Rue de Lyon 114B, planned for 2020
- Building D, Boulevard James-Fazy 15, used since 2006 by the fashion, jewelry and accessories design section

== Notable people ==
- Ying Gao
- Laurence Boissier (class of 2009)
- Sonia Kacem (class of 2009 and 2011)
- Emmanuel Tarpin (class of 2014)
