= Haus Konstruktiv =

Art museum in Zurich, Switzerland

Coordinates: 47.3725°N 8.5323°E

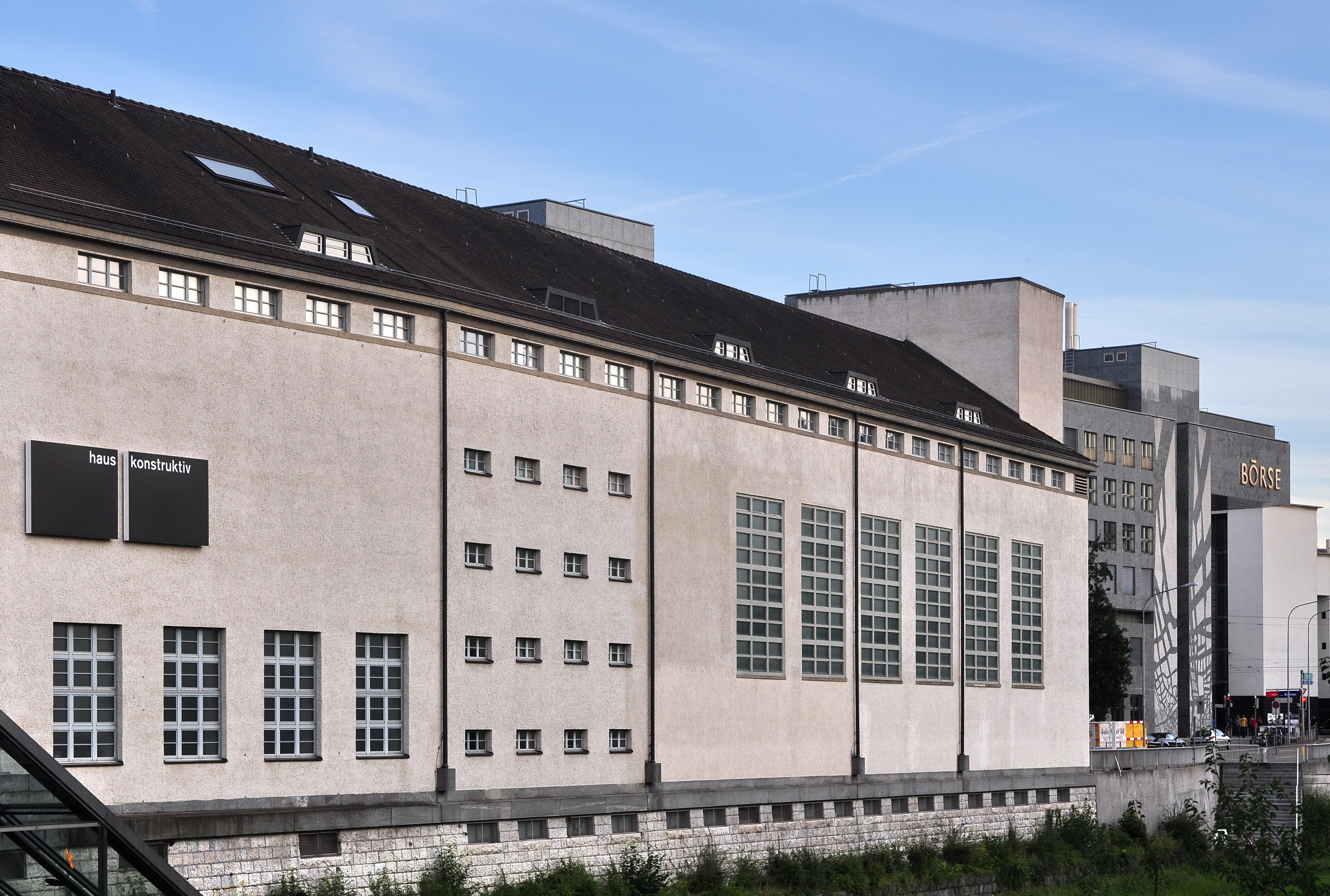
Haus Konstruktiv at Zurich Selnau

Haus Konstruktiv (English: Foundation for Constructive and Concrete Art), or Museum Haus Konstruktiv, is an arts foundation founded by private individuals in 1986 in Zürich, Switzerland.

== History ==
From 1987 to spring 2001, the institution was located at Seefeldstrasse 317 in the Seefeld district of Zurich and was known as the House for Constructive and Concrete Art. In 2001, it relocated to the Unterwerk Selnau, a former electricity substation near the city centre at Selnaustrasse 25.

The Unterwerk Selnau was built between 1930 and 1932 to plans by Zurich city architect Hermann Herter and was decommissioned in 1998. The museum was based there from 2001 until 2025, when it relocated to the Löwenbräukunst-Areal at Limmatstrasse 268 in Zurich’s Industriequartier, near Escher-Wyss-Platz. The move was carried out in phases to allow the exhibition programme to continue. The relocation followed plans for the building to be reused by EWZ as an energy centre as part of the Cool Zurich project.

== Collection ==
The collection of Haus Konstruktiv comprises around 1,000 paintings, sculptures, installations and objects, with a focus on constructive and concrete art. The collection includes works associated with the constructive-concrete tradition, which is characterised by geometric abstraction and an emphasis on form and colour. Works by artists such as Max Bill and Verena Loewensberg are represented in the collection.

Alongside constructive-concrete art, the museum’s collection and exhibition programme also engage with conceptual art.

== Awards and initiatives ==
The foundation promotes "constructive, concrete, and conceptual art and design". The Zurich Art Prize was founded in 2007 by the Museum Haus Konstruktiv together with the Zurich Insurance Group.
