= 2023 in Switzerland =

- Decades: 2000s; 2010s; 2020s
- See also: History of Switzerland; Timeline of Swiss history; List of years in Switzerland

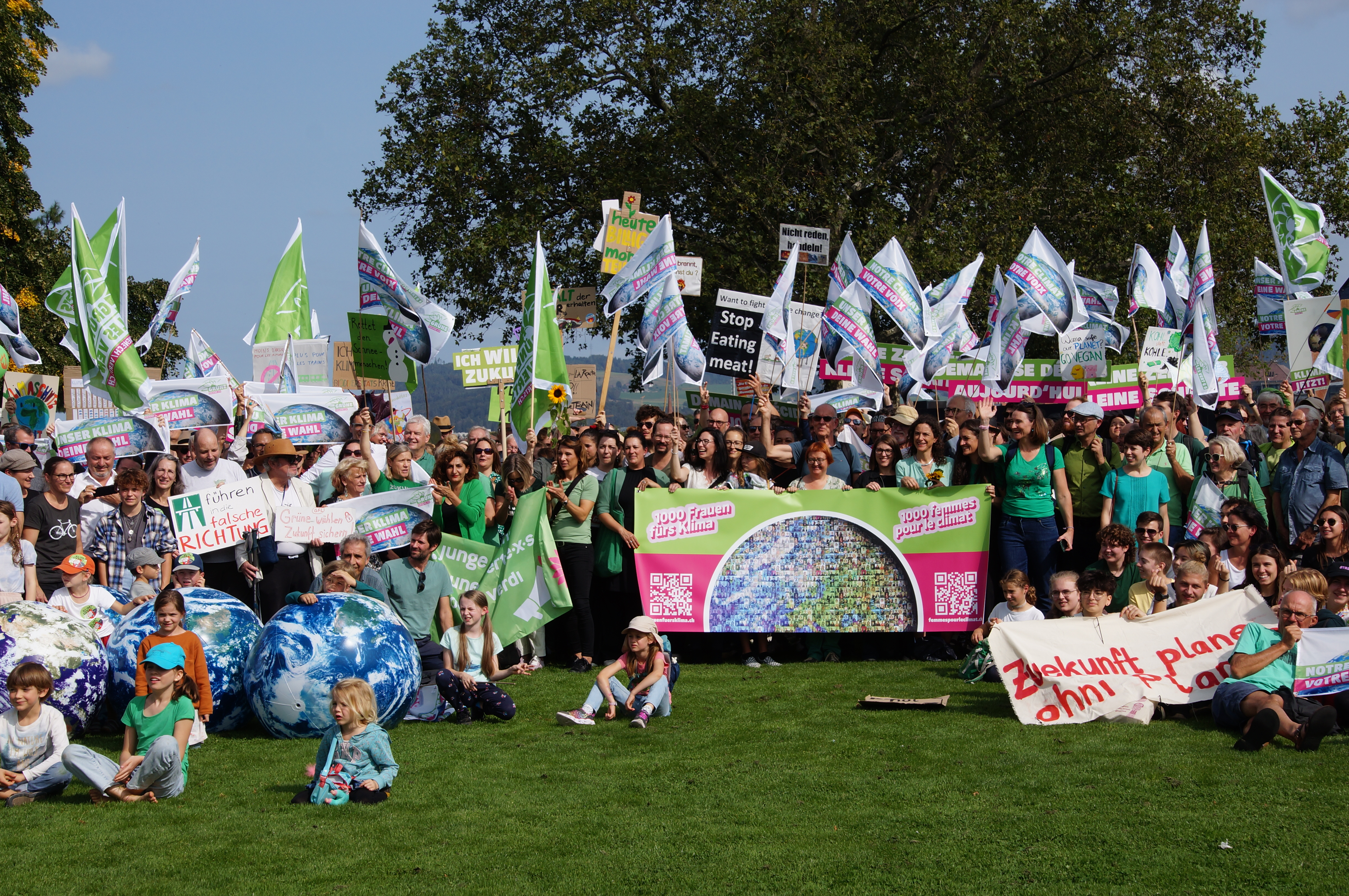
Group photo from 2023 of the Green Party of Switzerland on the Grosse Schanze in Bern

The following events occurred in Switzerland in the year 2023.

== Incumbents ==
- President of the Swiss Confederation: Alain Berset
- President of the National Council: Irène Kälin
- President of the Swiss Council of States: Thomas Hefti

== Events ==
- 5 February: Avalanches kill eight tourists in the Alps.
- 19 March: Acquisition of Credit Suisse by UBS: UBS Group AG, supported by the Swiss government, reaches a deal to merge with Credit Suisse as the latter faces imminent insolvency.
- 31 March: More than a dozen people are injured in separate incidents after two trains derail during a storm.
- 12 June: The Swiss Federal Administration reports a distributed denial of service attack on some of its websites.
- 16 June: The village of Brienz/Brinzauls in Grisons, is narrowly missed by an overnight 2 million m^{3} (71 million cu ft) rockslide. The village of 128 residents had been evacuated in May after scientists predicted the imminent rockslide.
- 17 June: Seven people are injured after a hot air balloon catches fire in Zug.
- 11 August: The Gotthard Base Tunnel is closed for at least six days after a freight train derails in the tunnel.
- 22 October: 2023 Swiss federal election: Voters in Switzerland elect the members of the country's Federal Assembly.
- 29 October: The National Council of Switzerland votes 151–29 to approve a ban on full-face coverings, such as burqas worn by Muslim women. Violators of the ban could face a fine of up to 1,000 Swiss francs.
- 11 December: Two people are killed and another person is wounded in a shooting in Sion. Swiss police says the suspect is in custody.

== Arts and entertainment ==
- 76th Locarno Film Festival August 2 – 12

== Sports ==
- 11–16 July – 2023 World Orienteering Championships in Graubunden
- 1–12 August – 2023 IFSC Climbing World Championships
- UEFA Euro 2024 qualifying Group I
- 2022–23 in Swiss football

- 2022–23 Swiss Promotion League
- 2022–23 Swiss Challenge League
- 2022–23 Swiss Super League
- 2022–23 Swiss Women's Super League
- 2022–23 Swiss Cup

== Deaths ==
- 4 January – Anton Schnider, 86, footballer (BSC Young Boys, FC Grenchen, national team)
- 7 January – Walter Intemann, 78, Swiss-born Austrian businessman and politician
- 9 January – K. Alex Müller, 95, physicist, Nobel Prize laureate (1987)
- 16 January – Mousse Boulanger, 96, writer and journalist
- 26 January – Edgar Schein, 94, Swiss-born American business theorist and psychologist
- 28 January – Max Huwyler, 91, Swiss writer
- 30 January – Donald M. Hess, 86, winemaker and art collector
- 2 February – Peter Facklam, 92, politician, member of the Executive Council of Basel-Stadt (1980–1992)
- 15 February – Gilbert Rist, 84, educator
- 23 February – François Couchepin, 88, lawyer and politician, chancellor (1991–1999)
- 7 March – André Haefliger, 93, mathematician (Haefliger structure)
- 8 March – Roland Hürzeler, 77, Olympic gymnast (1968)
- 23 March – Peter Marti, 70, footballer (Zürich, Basel, national team)
- 24 March – Marcel Blanc, 88, politician, Vaud state councillor (1978–1991)
- 28 March – Theodor Otto Diener, 102, Swiss-American plant pathologist, discoverer of viroids
- 7 April – Elisabeth Kopp, 86, politician, member of the Swiss Federal Council and minister of justice and police (1984–1989)
- 9 April – Roberto Frigerio, 84, footballer (Basel, Bellinzona, national team)
- 13 April – Eberhard W. Kornfeld, 99, auctioneer, author, and art dealer
- 25 April – Hanna Johansen, 83, German-born Swiss writer (7×7 Tales of a Sevensleeper)
- 26 April – Maja Hug, 95, Olympic figure skater.
- 2 May – Heidy Forster, 92, Swiss-German actress (Hinter den sieben Gleisen, The Roaring Fifties, The Foster Boy)
- 7 May – Peter Zeindler, 89, journalist, writer, and playwright
- 22 May – Michael E. Dreher, 79, politician, MP (1987–1999)
- 24 May – Tina Turner, 83, American-born singer ("River Deep – Mountain High", "What's Love Got to Do with It") and actress (Mad Max Beyond Thunderdome), 8-time Grammy winner.
- 31 May – Kurt Widmer, 82, baritone and voice teacher (City of Basel Music Academy)
- 6 June – Peter Henrici, 95, Roman Catholic prelate and philosopher, auxiliary bishop of Chur (1993–2007)
- 10 June – Hans Mössmer, 91, Olympic ice hockey player.
- 11 June – Jean Wicki, 89, bobsledder, Olympic champion (1972)
- 13 June – Philippe Borer, 68, violinist
- 16 June – Gino Mäder, 26, Olympic road cyclist (2020)
- 27 June – Peter Bieri, 79, writer and philosopher
- 10 July – Christine Hug, 41–42, lieutenant colonel
- 14 July – Albert Eschenmoser, 97, organic chemist (Eschenmoser's salt, Eschenmoser fragmentation, Eschenmoser sulfide contraction)
- 19 July – Silvana Lattmann, 104, Italian-Swiss poet and author
- 20 July – Arnaud Bédat, 58, journalist (L'Illustré) and author
- 1 August – Alfred Roch, 98, Olympic cross-country skier.
- 2 August – Laurence Deonna, 86, journalist
- 4 August – Andreas Däscher, 96, four-time Olympic ski jumper
- 9 August – Dionys Baeriswyl, 79, theoretical physicist
- 15 August – Ursula Cantieni, 75, Swiss-German actress (Die Fallers – Die SWR Schwarzwaldserie)
- 19 August – Hans Rudolf Gysin, 82, politician, member of the National Council (1987–2011)
- 22 August –
  - Martin Laciga, 48, Olympic beach volleyball player (2000, 2004)
  - Nicolas Gessner, 92, theatre and film director and screen writer.
- 12 September – Kurt Raaflaub, 82, academic and historian
- 9 October – Simone Chapuis-Bischof, 92, women's rights activist
- 10 October – Willy Pfund, 84, politician, member of the National Council (1983–1987).
- 11 October – Rainer Gut, 91, bank manager, chairman of Credit Suisse (1983–2000).
- 5 November – Susi Eppenberger, 92, politician, MP (1979–1991).
- 7 November – Werner Carobbio, 86, politician, member of the National Council (1975–1999).
- 15 November – Anna Felder, 85, writer
- 21 November – Georges Perroud, 82, footballer (Sion, Servette, national team).
- 22 November – François Musy, 68, Swiss-born French sound engineer (First Name: Carmen, Marguerite, Lost Illusions).
- 1 December – Heinz Gstrein, 81, Austrian-Swiss Oriental Orthodox theologian, foreign correspondent, and lecturer (University of Vienna).
- 3 December – Léonard Gianadda, 88, journalist (TSR), engineer, and philanthropist
- 8 December –
  - Michel Dovaz, 95, wine critic (Guide Hachette des Vins) and food writer
  - Jean-Pierre Moulin, 101, journalist (Le Matin), writer and author
- 9 December – Walter Leiser, 92, rower, Olympic silver medalist (1952)
- 10 December – Mark Villiger, 73, judge, justice of the European Court of Human Rights (2006–2015).
- 20 December – Gaston Häni, 72, Swiss clown
- 26 December – Lesley McNaught-Mändli, 59, British-born Swiss show jumper, Olympic silver medallist (2000).
- 28 December – Dick Marty, 78, politician, member of the Council of States (1995–2011).
