= List of members of the Federal Assembly from the Canton of St. Gallen =

Coat of Arms

This is a list of members of both houses of the Federal Assembly from the Canton of St. Gallen.

== Members of the Council of States ==
Councillor (Party)	Election	Councillor (Party)
Wilhelm Matthias Näff; Free Democratic Party; 1848–1848	Appointed	Georg Peter Friedrich Steiger; Liberal Party; 1848–1850
Arnold Otto Aepli; Liberal Party; 1849–1849	Appointed	Georg Peter Friedrich Steiger; Liberal Party; 1848–1850
Jakob Ulrich Ritter; Free Democratic Party; 1849–1850	Appointed	Georg Peter Friedrich Steiger; Liberal Party; 1848–1850
Felix Helbling; Free Democratic Party; 1850–1851	Appointed	Arnold Otto Aepli; Liberal Party; 1850–1851
Basil Ferdinand Curti; Free Democratic Party; 1851–1851	Appointed	Arnold Otto Aepli; Liberal Party; 1851–1852
Jos. Felix Marin Würth; Free Democratic Party; 1851–1852	Appointed	Arnold Otto Aepli; Liberal Party; 1851–1852
Arnold Otto Aepli; Liberal Party; 1853–1853	Appointed	Georg Peter Friedrich Steiger; Liberal Party; 1853–1853
Arnold Otto Aepli; Liberal Party; 1853–1853	Appointed	Johann Jakob L. Zingg; Liberal Party; 1853–1855
Carl Georg Jakob Sailer; Free Democratic Party; 1854–1857	Appointed	Johann Jakob L. Zingg; Liberal Party; 1853–1855
Carl Georg Jakob Sailer; Free Democratic Party; 1854–1857	Appointed	Johann Baptist Weder; Free Democratic Party; 1855–1857
Arnold Otto Aepli; Liberal Party; 1857–1864	Appointed	Gallus Jakob Baumgartner; Conservative; 1857–1861
Arnold Otto Aepli; Liberal Party; 1857–1864	Appointed	Benedikt Anton Wolfgang Hoefliger; Conservative; 1861–1864
Daniel Wirth; Free Democratic Party; 1864–1865	Appointed	Leonhard Gmür; Conservative; 1864–1867
Arnold Otto Aepli; Liberal Party; 1865–1872	Appointed	Leonhard Gmür; Conservative; 1864–1867
Arnold Otto Aepli; Liberal Party; 1865–1872	Appointed	Daniel Wirth; Free Democratic Party; 1867–1869
Arnold Otto Aepli; Liberal Party; 1865–1872	Appointed	Joseph Karl Pankraz Morel; Free Democratic Party; 1869–1874
Gustav Adolf Saxer; Free Democratic Party; 1872–1872	Appointed	Joseph Karl Pankraz Morel; Free Democratic Party; 1869–1874
Huldrich Arnold Seifert; Liberal Party; 1872–1873	Appointed	Joseph Karl Pankraz Morel; Free Democratic Party; 1869–1874
Karl J. Hoffmann; Free Democratic Party; 1873–1890	Appointed	Joseph Karl Pankraz Morel; Free Democratic Party; 1869–1874
Karl J. Hoffmann; Free Democratic Party; 1873–1890	Appointed	Franz Anton Real; Free Democratic Party; 1874–1877
Karl J. Hoffmann; Free Democratic Party; 1873–1890	Appointed	Nikl. Friedrich von Tschudi; Liberal Party; 1877–1885
Karl J. Hoffmann; Free Democratic Party; 1873–1890	Appointed	Jakob Hermann Wartmann; Liberal Party; 1885–1886
Karl J. Hoffmann; Free Democratic Party; 1873–1890	Appointed	Karl Friedrich Good; Free Democratic Party; 1886–1896
Emil Schubiger; Liberal Party; 1891–1896	Appointed	Karl Friedrich Good; Free Democratic Party; 1886–1896
Johannes G. jun. Geel; Free Democratic Party; 1896–1931	Appointed	H. Arthur Hoffmann; Free Democratic Party; 1896–1911
Johannes G. jun. Geel; Free Democratic Party; 1896–1931	Appointed	Heinrich Scherrer; Social Democratic Party; 1911–1919
Johannes G. jun. Geel; Free Democratic Party; 1896–1931	Appointed	Anton August Messmer; Conservative; 1919–1935
Ernst Löpfe; Free Democratic Party; 1931–1945	Appointed	Anton August Messmer; Conservative; 1919–1935
Ernst Löpfe; Free Democratic Party; 1931–1945	Appointed	Josef Schöbi; Conservative; 1935–1936
Ernst Löpfe; Free Democratic Party; 1931–1945	Appointed	Johann Schmuki; Conservative; 1936–1957
Ernst Flükiger; Free Democratic Party; 1945–1952	Appointed	Johann Schmuki; Conservative; 1936–1957
Willi Rohner; Free Democratic Party; 1952–1971	Appointed	Johann Schmuki; Conservative; 1936–1957
Willi Rohner; Free Democratic Party; 1952–1971	Appointed	Rudolf Mäder; Christian Social Conservative Party; 1957–1966
Willi Rohner; Free Democratic Party; 1952–1971	Appointed	Paul Hofmann; Christian Social Conservative Party; 1966–1979
Willi Rohner; Free Democratic Party; 1952–1971	1967	Paul Hofmann; Christian Social Conservative Party; 1966–1979
Matthias Eggenberger; Social Democratic Party; 1971–1975	1971	Paul Hofmann; Christian Social Conservative Party; 1966–1979
Paul Bürgi; Free Democratic Party; 1975–1987	1975	Paul Hofmann; Christian Social Conservative Party; 1966–1979
Paul Bürgi; Free Democratic Party; 1975–1987	1979	Jakob Schönenberger; Christian Democratic People's Party; 1979–1991
Paul Bürgi; Free Democratic Party; 1975–1987	1983	Jakob Schönenberger; Christian Democratic People's Party; 1979–1991
Ernst Rüesch; Free Democratic Party; 1987–1995	1987	Jakob Schönenberger; Christian Democratic People's Party; 1979–1991
Ernst Rüesch; Free Democratic Party; 1987–1995	1991	Paul Gemperli; Christian Democratic People's Party; 1991–1999
Erika Forster-Vannini; Free Democratic Party; 1995–2009; FDP.The Liberals; 2009–2011	1995	Paul Gemperli; Christian Democratic People's Party; 1991–1999
Erika Forster-Vannini; Free Democratic Party; 1995–2009; FDP.The Liberals; 2009–2011	1999	Eugen David; Christian Democratic People's Party; 1999–2011
Erika Forster-Vannini; Free Democratic Party; 1995–2009; FDP.The Liberals; 2009–2011	2003	Eugen David; Christian Democratic People's Party; 1999–2011
Erika Forster-Vannini; Free Democratic Party; 1995–2009; FDP.The Liberals; 2009–2011	2007	Eugen David; Christian Democratic People's Party; 1999–2011
Erika Forster-Vannini; Free Democratic Party; 1995–2009; FDP.The Liberals; 2009–2011	2009	Eugen David; Christian Democratic People's Party; 1999–2011
Karin Keller-Sutter; FDP.The Liberals; 2011–present	2011	Paul Rechsteiner; Social Democratic Party; 2011–2023
Karin Keller-Sutter; FDP.The Liberals; 2011–present	2015	Paul Rechsteiner; Social Democratic Party; 2011–2023
Benedikt Würth; Christian Democratic People's Party; 2019–2023; The Centre; 2023–present	2019	Paul Rechsteiner; Social Democratic Party; 2011–2023
Benedikt Würth; Christian Democratic People's Party; 2019–2023; The Centre; 2023–present	2023	Esther Friedli; FDP.The Liberals; 2023–present

== Members of the National Council ==
Councillor	Party	Term start	Term end
Johann Georg Anderegg	Liberal	1848	1856
Joseph Leonhard Bernold	FDP/PRD	1848	1857
Franz Eduard Erpf	Liberal	1848	1851
Dominik Gmür	FDP/PRD	1848	1851
Johann Matthias Hungerbühler	FDP/PRD	1848	1875
Joh. Jakob Steger	Conservative	1848	1851
Joseph Marzell von Hoffmann	FDP/PRD	1848	1866
Johann Baptist Weder	FDP/PRD	1848	1851
Abraham Raschle	FDP/PRD	1851	1860
Jakob Ulrich Ritter	FDP/PRD	1851	1851
Christian Rohrer	Liberal	1851	1860
Johann Benedikt Schubiger	FDP/PRD	1851	1859
Jakob Ulrich Ritter	FDP/PRD	1852	1854
Jakob Ulrich Ritter	FDP/PRD	1855	1857
Johann Josef Müller	Conservative	1856	1860
Josef Guldin	Conservative	1857	1860
Johann Baptist Weder	FDP/PRD	1858	1860
Joseph Leonhard Bernold	FDP/PRD	1860	1872
Basil Ferdinand Curti	FDP/PRD	1860	1866
Paravizin Hilty	FDP/PRD	1860	1866
Joh. Rudolf Raschle	FDP/PRD	1860	1863
Carl Georg Jakob Sailer	FDP/PRD	1860	1870
Johann Baptist Weder	FDP/PRD	1861	1872
Georg Friedrich Anderegg	Liberal	1863	1875
Friedrich Bernet	Grut*	1864	1869
Johann Baptist Gaudy	SD/DS	1866	1881
G. August Suter	Grut*	1866	1869
Johannes Zündt	Conservative	1866	1872
Johann Ulrich Ambühl	Liberal	1869	1872
Daniel Wirth	FDP/PRD	1869	1878
Joh. Fridolin Müller	Conservative	1870	1888
Arnold Otto Aepli	Liberal	1872	1883
Johannes G. sen. Geel	Liberal	1872	1875
Johann Ulrich Hafner	Liberal	1872	1874
Rudolf Hilty	FDP/PRD	1872	1884
Gustav Adolf Saxer	FDP/PRD	1872	1878
Thomas Thoma	Liberal	1874	1884
Johann Josef Huber	FDP/PRD	1875	1878
Johann Joseph Keel	Conservative	1875	1902
Samuel Friedrich Rikli	Conservative	1875	1878
Wilhelm Good	Conservative	1878	1897
Joh. Gebhard Lutz	Conservative	1878	1909
Joh. Rudolf Moser	Liberal	1878	1882
Karl Emil V. von Gonzenbach	Conservative	1878	1884
Theodor Curti	DAP*	1881	1902
Laurenz Schönenberger	Conservative	1882	1890
Roderich Albert Kunkler	Liberal	1883	1886
Adolf Grubenmann	Liberal	1884	1890
G. August Suter	FDP/PRD	1884	1890
Christoph Tobler	Liberal	1884	1899
Joh. Jakob Müller	FDP/PRD	1886	1887
Johannes Blumer	FDP/PRD	1887	1893
Jos. Othmar Staub	Conservative	1888	1919
Johann Georg Berlinger	FDP/PRD	1890	1900
Carl Hilty	FDP/PRD	1890	1909
Joseph Anton Scherrer-Füllemann	SD/DS	1890	1922
Johann Bapt. Schubiger	Conservative	1890	1919
Eduard Steiger	SD/DS	1891	1896
Karl Emil Wild	FDP/PRD	1893	1919
J. K. Ferdinand Hidber	Conservative	1898	1905
Johann Jakob Gächter	Conservative	1899	1905
Ernst Wagner	FDP/PRD	1900	1919
Johann Jakob Bösch	FDP/PRD	1902	1908
Paul J. Brandt	DAP*	1902	1905
Thomas Holenstein	Conservative	1902	1928
Heinrich Scherrer	SP/PS	1902	1911
Emil Grünenfelder	Conservative	1905	1943
Albert Mächler	FDP/PRD	1905	1934
Karl A. Zurburg	Conservative	1905	1925
Robert Forrer	FDP/PRD	1908	1924
Johann B. Eisenring	Conservative	1909	1919
Gallus Schwendener	FDP/PRD	1909	1919
Eduard Scherrer	FDP/PRD	1911	1919
Ernst Schmidheiny	FDP/PRD	1911	1919
Heinrich Otto Weber	SD/DS	1911	1928
Johannes Duft	Conservative	1919	1939
Johann Jakob Gabathuler	FDP/PRD	1919	1929
Johannes Huber	SP/PS	1919	1947
Valentin Keel	SP/PS	1919	1931
Joseph Anton Scherrer-Brisig	Conservative	1919	1951
L. August Schirmer	FDP/PRD	1919	1941
Jakob-Dionys Steiner	Conservative	1919	1928
Johannes Züblin	FDP/PRD	1919	1925
Johann-Jakob Biroll	Conservative	1922	1931
Anton Brügger	FDP/PRD	1924	1931
Jakob Fenk	SP/PS	1925	1947
Bruno Pfister	FDP/PRD	1925	1935
Eduard Guntli	Conservative	1928	1933
Emil Mäder	Conservative	1928	1936
Paul Müller	Conservative	1928	1935
Friedrich Pestalozzi	FDP/PRD	1929	1933
Emil Hardegger	SP/PS	1931	1935
Albert Geser	Conservative	1933	1935
Arnold Saxer	FDP/PRD	1933	1938
Jakob Schmidheiny	FDP/PRD	1934	1935
Ulrich Eggenberger	LDU/LdI	1935	1939
Johann Jakob Gabathuler	FDP/PRD	1935	1947
Johannes Müller	Conservative	1935	1937
Jakob Nüesch	AVL	1935	1939
Ludwig Rittmeyer	FDP/PRD	1935	1944
Otto Huber	Conservative	1936	1939
Thomas Holenstein	Conservative	1937	1954
Bruno Pfister	FDP/PRD	1938	1939
Gallus Eugster	Conservative	1939	1959
Arnold Kappler	Conservative	1939	1947
Karl Kobelt	FDP/PRD	1939	1940
Otto Pfändler	LDU/LdI	1939	1943
Josef Riedener	Conservative	1939	1947
Rolf Theodor Bühler	FDP/PRD	1941	1943
Alfred Baumgartner	FDP/PRD	1942	1944
Emil Anderegg	FDP/PRD	1943	1951
Ulrich Eggenberger	LDU/LdI	1943	1946
Albert Spindler	JB	1943	1947
Rolf Theodor Bühler	FDP/PRD	1944	1947
Johann Jakob Schwendener	FDP/PRD	1944	1951
Christian Eggenberger	LDU/LdI	1946	1951
Matthias Eggenberger	SP/PS	1947	1971
Theodor Eisenring	Conservative	1947	1961
Albert Gemperli	Conservative	1947	1963
Harald Huber	SP/PS	1947	1962
Jean Pozzi	FDP/PRD	1947	1959
Alfons Schwizer	Conservative	1947	1963
Andreas Zeller	FDP/PRD	1947	1951
Emil Bösch	LDU/LdI	1951	1963
René Bühler	FDP/PRD	1951	1959
Johann Jakob Gabathuler	FDP/PRD	1951	1951
Walter Klingler	Conservative	1951	1955
Willi Rohner	FDP/PRD	1951	1952
Michael Schwendener	FDP/PRD	1951	1963
Hans Albrecht	FDP/PRD	1952	1959
Kurt Furgler	Conservative	1954	1971
Andreas Zeller	Conservative	1955	1970
Paul Bürgi	FDP/PRD	1959	1975
Ernst Grob	FDP/PRD	1959	1971
Walter Klingler	CCS	1959	1967
Max Schmidheiny	FDP/PRD	1959	1963
Anton Stadler	CCS	1961	1963
Remigius Bärlocher	CCS	1963	1971
Simon Frick	FDP/PRD	1963	1967
Walter Gerosa	LDU/LdI	1963	1971
Walter Hagmann	CCS	1963	1975
Alfred Hummler	FDP/PRD	1963	1971
Hans Schregenberger	CCS	1963	1971
Florian Vetsch	SP/PS	1963	1969
Hans Hofer	FDP/PRD	1967	1975
Anton Stadler	CCS	1967	1975
Florian Schlegel	SP/PS	1969	1972
Andreas Dürr	CCS	1970	1983
Georg Nef	FDP/PRD	1971	1987
Edgar Oehler	CVP/PDC	1971	1995
Hanna Sahlfeld-Singer	SP/PS	1971	1975
Hanny Thalmann	CVP/PDC	1971	1979
Remigius Kaufmann	CVP/PDC	1972	1983
Hans Schmid	SP/PS	1972	1985
Kurt Bürer	CVP/PDC	1975	1987
Traugott Hungerbühler	CVP/PDC	1975	1979
Ruedi Schatz	FDP/PRD	1975	1979
Burkhard Vetsch	FDP/PRD	1975	1984
Walter Ammann	SP/PS	1976	1991
Susi Eppenberger	FDP/PRD	1979	1991
Josef Kühne	CVP/PDC	1979	1995
Eva Segmüller	CVP/PDC	1979	1995
Titus Giger	FDP/PRD	1983	1995
Hans Ruckstuhl	CVP/PDC	1983	1995
Walter Zwingli	FDP/PRD	1984	1991
Hans Rohrer	SP/PS	1985	1986
Paul Rechsteiner	SP/PS	1986	1995
Eugen David	CVP/PDC	1987	1995
Hans Werner Widrig	CVP/PDC	1987	1991
Elisabeth Caspar-Hutter	SP/PS	1991	1995
Pia Hollenstein	GPS/PES	1991	1995
Franz Jaeger	LDU/LdI	1991	1995
Walter Steinemann	0	1991	1995
Milli Wittenwiler	FDP/PRD	1991	1995
Fredi Alder	SP/PS	1995	1999
Toni Brunner	SVP/UDC	1995	Incumbent
Eugen David	CVP/PDC	1995	1999
Barbara Eberhard-Halter	LDU/LdI	1995	1995
Kathrin Hilber	SP/PS	1995	1996
Pia Hollenstein	GPS/PES	1995	2006
Josef Kühne	CVP/PDC	1995	1999
Paul Rechsteiner	SP/PS	1995	2011
Hans Ruckstuhl	CVP/PDC	1995	1999
Walter Steinemann	0	1995	1999
Peter Weigelt	FDP/PRD	1995	2003
Hans Werner Widrig	CVP/PDC	1995	2003
Milli Wittenwiler	FDP/PRD	1995	2003
Hildegard Fässler-Osterwalder	SP/PS	1997	2003
Elmar Bigger	SVP/UDC	1999	2011
Walter Hess	CVP/PDC	1999	2003
Lucrezia Meier-Schatz	CVP/PDC	1999	2015
Theophil Pfister	SVP/UDC	1999	2011
Felix Walker	CVP/PDC	1999	2006
Jakob Büchler	CVP/PDC	2003	2018
Hildegard Fässler-Osterwalder	SP/PS	2003	2013
Jasmin Hutter	SVP/UDC	2003	2009
Walter Müller	FDP/PRD	2003	Incumbent
Peter Weigelt	FDP/PRD	2003	2006
Urs Bernhardsgrütter	GPS/PES	2006	2007
Thomas Müller	CVP/PDC	2006	Incumbent
Andreas Zeller	FDP/PRD	2006	2007
Yvonne Gilli	GPS/PES	2007	2015
Lukas Reimann	SVP/UDC	2007	Incumbent
Roland Rino Büchel	SVP/UDC	2010	Incumbent
Barbara Gysi	SP/PS	2011	Incumbent
Margrit Kessler	GLP/PVL	2011	2015
Markus Ritter	CVP/PDC	2011	Incumbent
Claudia Friedl	SP/PS	2013	Incumbent
Thomas Ammann	CVP/PDC	2015	Incumbent
Marcel Dobler	FDP/PLR	2015	Incumbent
Barbara Keller-Inhelder	SVP/UDC	2015	Incumbent
Nicolo Paganini	CVP/PDC	2018	Incumbent
