= Carobbio =

Carobbio may refer to:

== People ==
- Filippo Carobbio (born 1979), Italian footballer
- Marina Carobbio Guscetti (born 1966), Swiss politician
- Werner Carobbio (1936–2023), Swiss politician

== Places ==
- Carobbio degli Angeli, Italian municipality
