= Pietro Martinelli =

Pietro Martinelli may refer to:

- Pietro Martinelli (cyclist)
- Pietro Martinelli (politician)
