= Mousse Boulanger =

Swiss poet, actress, and television producer (1926–2023)

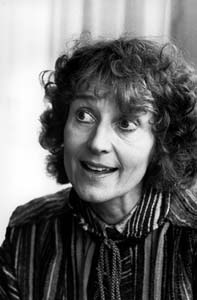
- Boulanger in 1981
- Born: Berthe Sophie Neuenschwander; 3 November 1926; Boncourt, Switzerland
- Died: 16 January 2023 (aged 96); Payerne, Switzerland
- Education: École sociale de musique
- Occupations: Poet; Actress; Television producer
- Spouse: Pierre Boulanger (m. 1955; died 1978)

Mousse Boulanger (born Berthe Sophie Neuenschwander; 3 November 1926 – 16 January 2023) was a Swiss poet, actress, and television producer.

== Biography ==
Neuenschwander was born in Boncourt on 3 November 1926 and attended a cantonal school in Porrentruy before turning to journalism and poetry. After a stay in Cambridge, she studied theatre at the École sociale de musique in Geneva. On 27 May 1953, she attended the annual congress of the cultural organization Connaître, where she met her future husband, Pierre Boulanger. The couple would marry in 1955.

In 1961, Pierre and Mousse Boulanger started a program on Bulgarian literature in the series Poésie universelle. The two were then invited to the embassy in Bulgaria and made their debut on stage. They would return to Bulgaria ten more times. From 1971 to 1974, they toured with José Azpiazu and his daughter, Lupe. The four of them would present a show in Romandy and France.

In 1975, Boulanger recorded an album titled Berceuse pour une maman, for which she wrote texts in French. In August 1973, Pierre and Mousse presented Marchands d'images at the Festival de Rochessauve, created by Paul Vincensini and Marcel Maréchal. That year, they presented Poésie dans les quartiers at the Centre dramatique national in Lyon in affiliation with the Ministry of National Education and Pierre Emmanuel of the Académie Française. At the Festival d'Avignon in 1974, they presented two poetry shows: Poésie pour tous and Théâtre des poèmes. Through their various shows and presentations, they would become ambassadors of French-speaking culture abroad.

Boulanger's husband, Pierre, died on 28 October 1978 at the age of 50 after contracting a disease in Africa. The year prior, she co-founded the Association des Amis de Gustave Roud alongside her husband, as well as Jeanlouis Cornuz and Vio Martin. After her husband's death, she occasionally served on the literary jury of the Société jurassienne d'émulation.

Boulanger died in Payerne on 16 January 2023, at the age of 96.

== Awards ==
- Prix des écrivains vaudois (1997)

== Poetry ==
- Tendre pays (1967)
- Reflets (1973)
- Ce qui reste du jour (1975)
- Poèmes-missives (1985)
- Poèmes à l’homme (1988)
- "Ballade octobrine" (1995)
- L’Écuelle des souvenirs (2000)
- J’attends les algues sur la pierre (2005)
- Aussi mince que l’oiseau (2007)
- Le Collier des solitudes (2008)
- Sagesse de l’arbre (2013)
- L’Oisellerie (2017)

== Interviews ==
=== Radio Suisse Romande ===
- "L’art de Corinna Bille" (1969)
- "Rencontre avec un poète : Jean Pache" (1984)
- "Maurice Chappaz, le souffle du Vieux-Pays (4/5)" (2014)

=== Plans-fixes ===
- "Alice Rivaz : écrivain : le 15 juillet 1986 à Genève" (1986)
- "Blanche Merz : une pionnière : le 30 août 2000 à Chardonne" (2000)
- "Jeanlouis Cornuz : enseignant, écrivain le 20 juin 2001 à Lausanne" (2001)
- "Jean Mayerat : regards engagés le 17 janvier 2002 à Rolle" (2002)
- "Jacqueline Thibault : guetteur d’aurore : le 30 mai 2002 au Mont-sur-Rolle" (2002)
- "Étienne Chatton : quand la passion se fait destin : le 1er octobre 2002 à Fribourg" (2002)
- "Hugo Loetscher : écrivain : le 7 juin 2004 à Lausanne" (2004)

== Television episodes ==
- "Mousse Boulanger reçoit Madame TV" on Madame TV (1969)
- "Mousse Boulanger : Une voix pour la poésie : le 18 mars 2000 à Mézières" on Plans-fixes (2000)
- "Entretien avec Mousse Boulanger : Les Frontalières" on Entre les lignes (2013)
- "Épisode 5 : À la rencontre de Mousse Boulanger [émission réalisée à l’occasion du Printemps de la poésie sur une proposition d’élèves]" (2019)
