= Autonomous Socialist Party (Ticino) =

Swiss political party

Autonomous Socialist Party Partito Socialista Autonomo
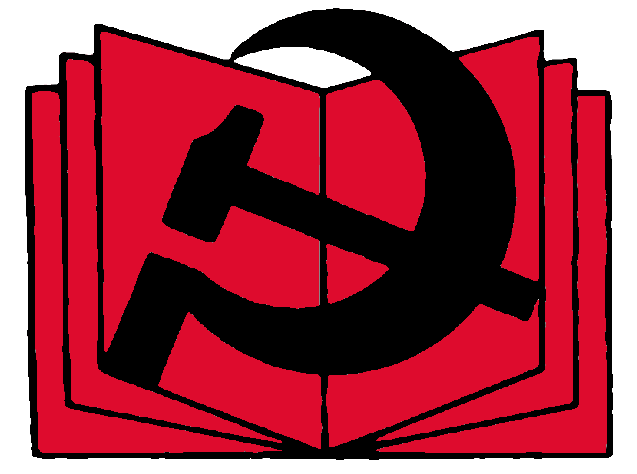
- Abbreviation: PSA
- Founded: 1966
- Dissolved: 1992
- Split from: Social Democratic Party
- Merged into: Social Democratic Party
- Headquarters: Bellinzona, Ticino
- Ideology: Communism; Marxism
- Political position: Far-left

Party flag
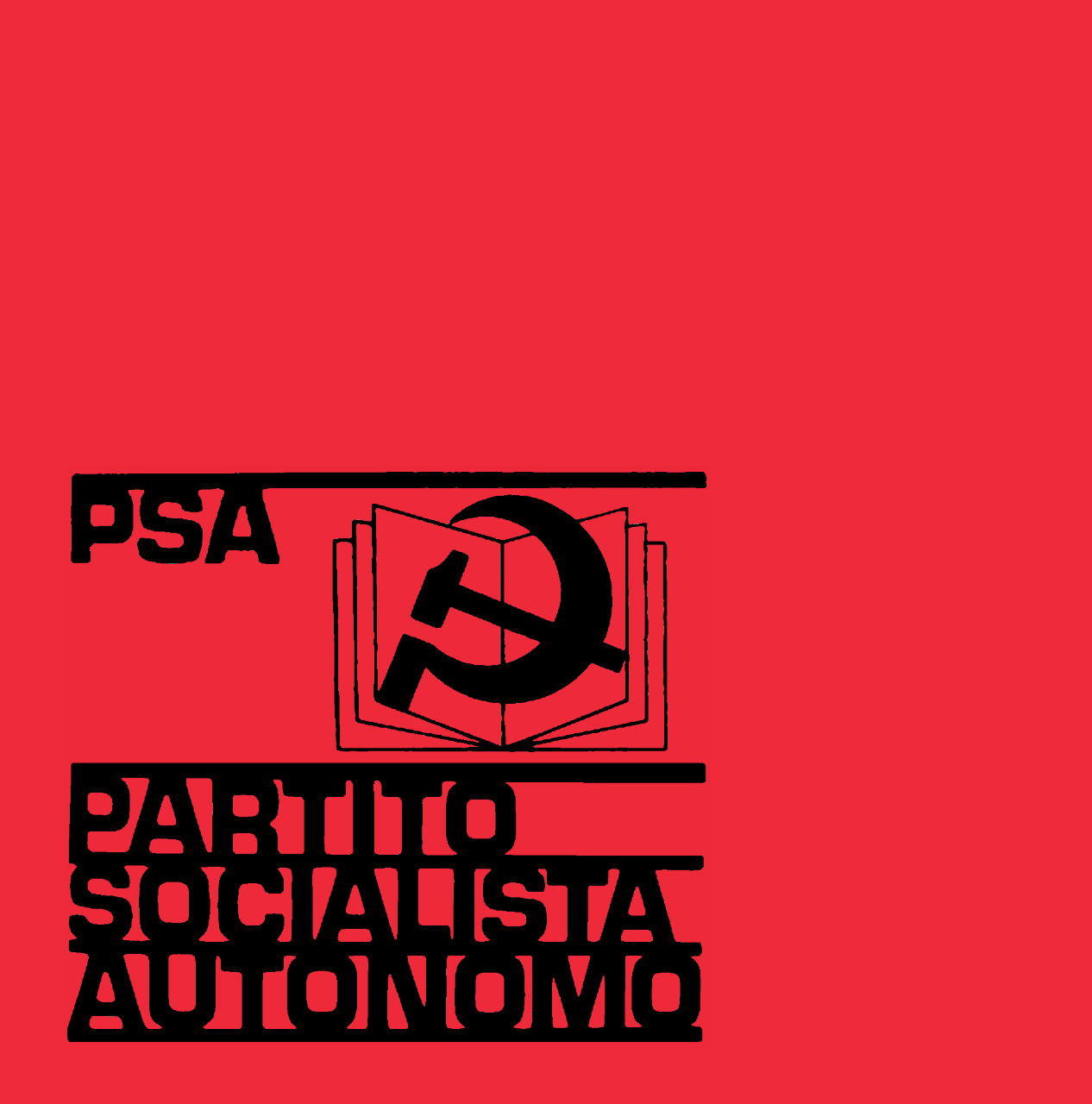

The Autonomous Socialist Party (Italian: Partito Socialista Autonomo, PSA) was a far-left political party in Switzerland, based in the canton of Ticino.

== History ==
The PSA was established in 1966; its founders were former members from the Social Democratic Party who had been expelled for their far-left views. It failed to win a seat in the National Council in the 1971 federal elections, but in the 1975 elections it ran in Ticino in alliance with the Progressive Organizations of Switzerland (POCH), with Werner Carobbio winning one seat. It continued its alliance with POCH for the 1979 elections, retaining its single seat. It retained the seat again in the 1983 and 1987. It was renamed Unitarian Socialist Party in 1988, The PSA was well represented in the Grand Council of Ticino, maintaining between six and nine seats in the legislature (of ninety) constantly between 1971 and 1991. After retaining its seat again in 1991, it merged back into the Social Democratic Party in 1992.

== Election history ==
=== National Council ===
Election	Votes	%	Seats	+/–	Rank
1971	5,271	0.3	0 / 200	Steady	12th
1975	6,706	0.3	1 / 200	▲1	13th
1979	8,147	0.4	1 / 200	Steady	13th
1983	9,962	0.5	1 / 200	Steady	14th
1987	10,879	0.6	1 / 200	Steady	14th
1991	12,006	0.6	1 / 200	Steady	15th

=== Grand Council of Ticino ===
Election	%	Seats	+/–	Rank
1971	6.7	6 / 90	▲6	4th
1975	7.6	6 / 90	Steady	4th
1979	9.4	8 / 90	▲2	4th
1983	10.6	8 / 90	Steady	4th
1987	11.0	7 / 90	▼1	4th
1991	10.0	9 / 90	▲2	5th

== Notable members ==
- Werner Carobbio
- Pietro Martinelli
