= Fondation Pierre Gianadda =

Museum in Martigny

Dixon Gallery and Gardens
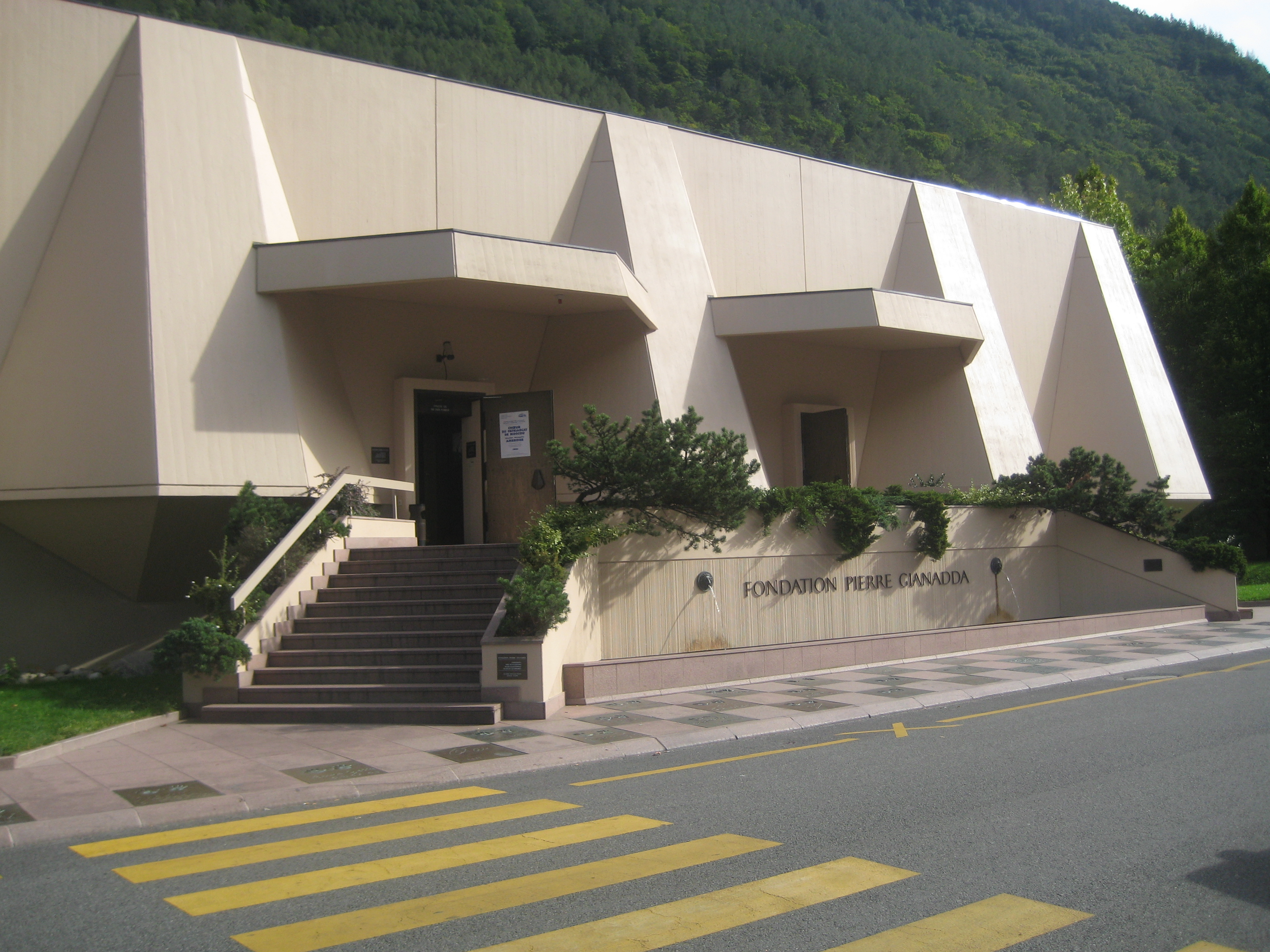
- Photo of the front of the "Fondation Pierre Gianadda" building
- Location: Martigny, Switzerland
- Coordinates: 46.095°N 7.071°E

Fondation Pierre Gianadda, inaugurated in 1978, administers museums and exhibitions located in Martigny, Switzerland. The permanent exhibitions include the Automobile Museum, Gallo-Roman Museum, Louis and Evelyn Franck Collection, Sculpture Park, and Chagall Court.

== History ==
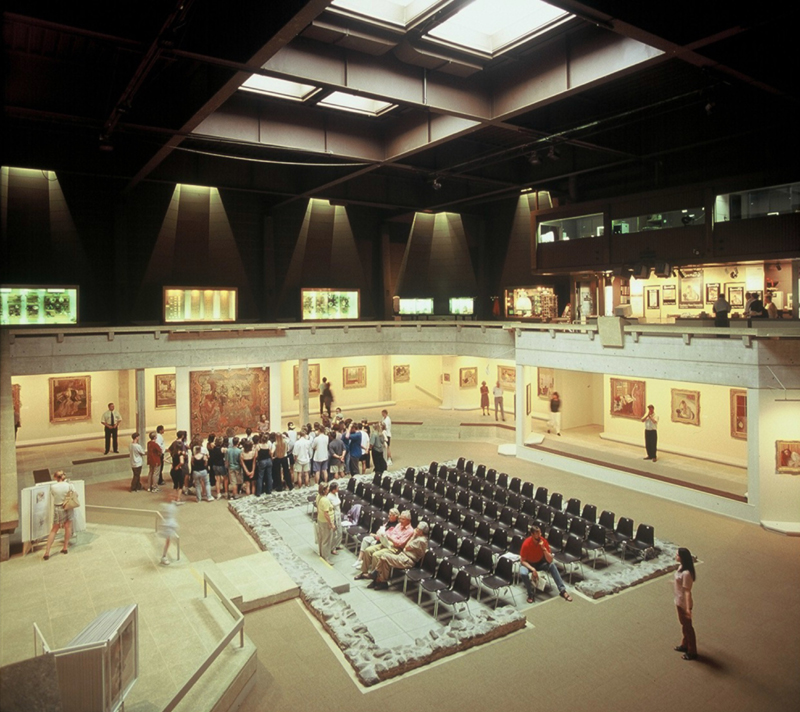
Interior photo of the "Fondation Pierre Gianadda" building

The Foundation was founded by Léonard Gianadda in memory of his younger brother Pierre, who was killed in an airplane crash in 1976.
