= Hanny Thalmann =

Swiss politician

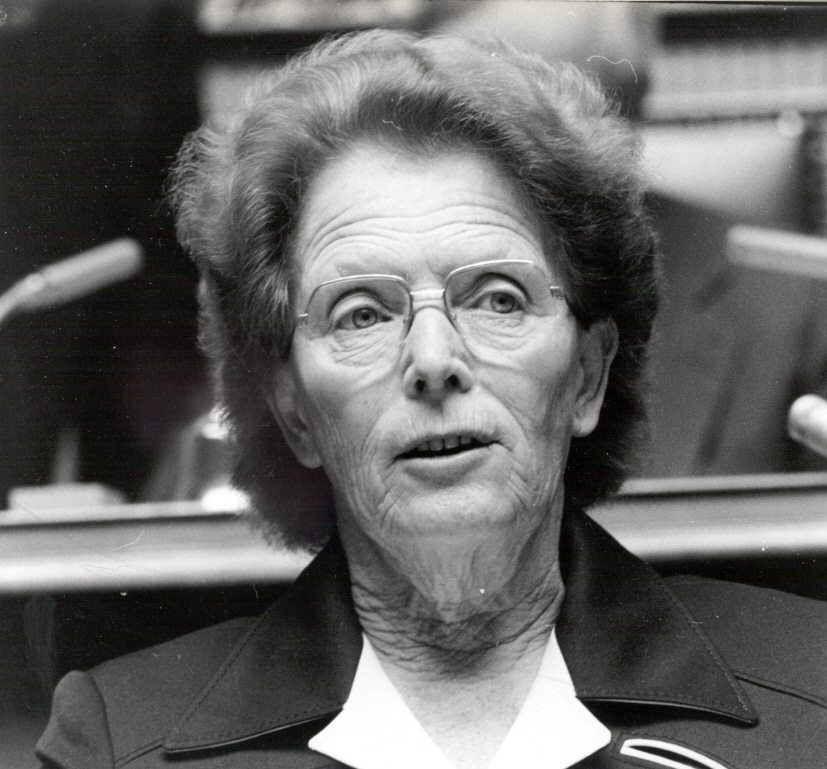
- Hanny Thalmann (1986)

Member of the National Council of Switzerland
- In office 29 November 1971 – 25 November 1979

Personal details
- Born: 26 July 1916 Gossau, canton of St. Gallen
- Died: 11 May 2000 (aged 83) St. Gallen
- Party: Christian Democratic People's Party of Switzerland
- Education: Business Academy of St. Gallen
- Occupation: Women's rights activist

Hanny Johanna Hermina Thalmann (26 July 1916 in Gossau, canton of St. Gallen – 11 May 2000 in St. Gallen) was a Swiss women's rights activist and politician of the Christian Democratic People's Party. She was among the first ten women to seat in the National Council after women's suffrage was introduced in 1971.

== Life and career ==
Thalmann's father, a Realschule teacher, died at an early age in 1920. After attending her local primary school, Hanny Thalmann moved to Flums, St. Gallen with her mother. She had a vocational business training in Walenstadt, canton of St. Gallen, and later graduated from the business school of the Institute of Menzingen, canton of Zurich. In 1933, she joined the Business Academy of St. Gallen, but she had to pause her studies due to a lung disease in 1932–33. After an internship in a bank in Wil, canton of St. Gallen, she earned a business teaching diploma in 1937 and a doctor's degree in economics in 1943 thanks to a thesis about the industry in Sarganserland. She was the first female who earned an Economics and Finance PhD from that Academy. During her studies, she helped her uncle, the Catholic priest Richard Senti, to administrate his parish in Wil. During her doctorate years, she also attended the business training college of Uzwil.

Thalmann taught at the vocational school of retail business in St. Gallen from 1945 to 1974 and became the director of that school in 1958. She was a board member of the St. Gallen Women's Central Office from 1950 to 1981 (of which she was the vice-chairwoman for some time), and a member of the cantonal board of the Catholic Women League in St. Gallen and Appenzell from 1954 to 1988. Thalmann notably caimpagned for women's suffrage. She was the first female member of the educational board of the canton of St. Gallen from 1968 to 1983, and from 1971 to 1979 the first female National Councillor from the canton of St. Gallen. She was among the first ten women to seat in the National Council after women's suffrage was introduced in federal elections in 1971. In 1967, she was a recipient of the Appreciation Award (Annerkennungspreis) of the City of St. Gallen.

Thalmann was involved in social and vocational education issues, and promoted vocational training of women in her canton, as well as maternity rights and maternity insurance in the National Council.

Thalmann was single. She died on 11 May 2000 in St. Gallen.

In 2019, her name was engraved on desks of the National Council chamber alongside the names of early elected female parliamentaries.

== Works (selection) ==
- "Die private Lohnstatistik in der Schweiz". Betriebswirtschaftliche Studien. 19/20. Wil. 1937.
- Die Industrie im Sarganserland. Enstehung, Entwicklung und Auswirkung mit Berücksichtigung des Standortes. Mels, 1943.
- Schwierigkeiten unserer berufstätigen Jugend, 1963.

== See also ==
- List of members of the Federal Assembly from the Canton of St. Gallen
- List of the first women holders of political offices in Europe
- Women's suffrage in Switzerland
