= 1987 Swiss federal election =

← 1983	18 October 1987	1991 →
- All 200 seats in the National Council (101 seats needed for a majority); All 46 seats in the Council of States (24 seats needed for a majority)
- Turnout: 46.5% ▼2.4 pp
Party	Leader	Vote %	Seats	+/–
National Council
Free Democrats	Bruno Hunziker	22.9%	51	−3
Christian Democrats	Eva Segmüller	19.6%	42	0
Social Democrats	Helmut Hubacher	18.4%	41	−6
Swiss People's	Adolf Ogi	11.0%	25	+2
Greens	Hanspeter Thür	4.9%	9	+6
LdU	Franz Jaeger	4.2%	8	0
Green Alliance		4.0%	4	+1
Liberals	Gilbert Coutau	2.7%	9	+1
Motorists'	Jürg Scherrer	2.6%	2	New
National Action	Rudolf Keller	2.5%	3	−1
Evangelical People's	Max Dünki	1.9%	3	0
Labour		0.8%	1	0
Autonomous Socialists		0.6%	1	0
KHM	Herbert Maeder		1	0
Council of States
Christian Democrats			19	+1
Free Democrats			14	0
Social Democrats			5	−1
Swiss People's			4	−1
Liberals			3	0
LdU			1	+1
This lists parties that won seats. See the complete results below.

Federal elections were held in Switzerland on 18 October 1987. The Free Democratic Party remained the largest party in the National Council, winning 51 of the 200 seats.

== Results ==
=== National Council ===
Party	Votes	%	Seats	+/–
Free Democratic Party	443,617	22.93	51	–3
Christian Democratic People's Party	378,822	19.58	42	0
Social Democratic Party	356,266	18.42	41	–6
Swiss People's Party	213,253	11.02	25	+2
Green Party	94,378	4.88	9	+5
Alliance of Independents	80,691	4.17	8	0
Green Alliance	77,451	4.00	4	+1
Liberal Party	52,532	2.72	9	+1
Swiss Motorists' Party	50,372	2.60	2	New
National Action	49,104	2.54	3	–1
Evangelical People's Party	37,265	1.93	3	0
Federal Democratic Union	17,830	0.92	0	0
Swiss Party of Labour	15,528	0.80	1	0
Autonomous Socialist Party	10,879	0.56	1	0
Republican Movement	6,769	0.35	0	–1
Independent Social-Christian Party	5,889	0.30	0	0
Other parties	43,803	2.26	1	–
Total	1,934,449	100.00	200	0
Valid votes	1,934,449	98.77		
Invalid/blank votes	24,007	1.23		
Total votes	1,958,456	100.00		
Registered voters/turnout	4,214,595	46.47		
Source: Nohlen & Stöver

==== By constituency ====
Constituency	Seats	Electorate	Turnout	Party	Votes	Seats won
Aargau	14	307,082	132,398	Free Democratic Party	371,074	3
Aargau	14	307,082	132,398	Christian Democratic People's Party	346,025	3
Aargau	14	307,082	132,398	Social Democratic Party	337,945	3
Aargau	14	307,082	132,398	Swiss People's Party	286,789	3
Aargau	14	307,082	132,398	Green Alliance	125,768	1
Aargau	14	307,082	132,398	Swiss Motorists' Party	97,569	0
Aargau	14	307,082	132,398	Ring of Independents	86,665	1
Aargau	14	307,082	132,398	National Action	82,397	0
Aargau	14	307,082	132,398	Evangelical People's Party	61,516	0
Aargau	14	307,082	132,398	Federal Democratic Union	18,972	0
Aargau	14	307,082	132,398	Women for Aargau	14,209	0
Appenzell Ausserrhoden	2	Elected unopposed		Free Democratic Party		1
Appenzell Ausserrhoden	2	Elected unopposed		"Herbert Maeder" Committee		1
Appenzell Innerrhoden	1	8,967	2,027	Christian Democratic People's Party	1,726	1
Appenzell Innerrhoden	1	8,967	2,027	Others	146	0
Basel-Landschaft	7	152,662	71,282	Social Democratic Party	112,265	3
Basel-Landschaft	7	152,662	71,282	Free Democratic Party	108,096	2
Basel-Landschaft	7	152,662	71,282	Swiss People's Party	58,831	1
Basel-Landschaft	7	152,662	71,282	Christian Democratic People's Party	60,355	1
Basel-Landschaft	7	152,662	71,282	Green Alliance	46,420	1
Basel-Landschaft	7	152,662	71,282	Green Party	34,041	0
Basel-Landschaft	7	152,662	71,282	National Action	30,332	0
Basel-Landschaft	7	152,662	71,282	Evangelical People's Party	15,883	0
Basel-Landschaft	7	152,662	71,282	Ring of Independents	13,050	0
Basel-Landschaft	7	152,662	71,282	Swiss Motorists' Party	12,670	0
Basel-Stadt	6	134,127	58,398	Social Democratic Party	90,208	2
Basel-Stadt	6	134,127	58,398	Liberal Party	42,725	1
Basel-Stadt	6	134,127	58,398	Free Democratic Party	38,819	1
Basel-Stadt	6	134,127	58,398	Green Alliance	44,080	1
Basel-Stadt	6	134,127	58,398	Christian Democratic People's Party	34,691	0
Basel-Stadt	6	134,127	58,398	Ring of Independents	32,685	1
Basel-Stadt	6	134,127	58,398	Evangelical People's Party	15,798	0
Basel-Stadt	6	134,127	58,398	National Action	15,611	0
Basel-Stadt	6	134,127	58,398	People's Action	12,019	0
Basel-Stadt	6	134,127	58,398	Party of Labour	6,565	0
Basel-Stadt	6	134,127	58,398	Green Center	5,822	0
Basel-Stadt	6	134,127	58,398	Green Party	3,846	0
Basel-Stadt	6	134,127	58,398	Die Grünen	3,687	0
Basel-Stadt	6	134,127	58,398	The Blue Planet	1,038	0
Basel-Stadt	6	134,127	58,398	Social Liberal European Federalist Party	141	0
Bern	29	647,126	295,606	Swiss People's Party	2,351,139	9
Bern	29	647,126	295,606	Social Democratic Party	1,884,108	7
Bern	29	647,126	295,606	Free Democratic Party	1,363,827	5
Bern	29	647,126	295,606	Green Party	782,080	3
Bern	29	647,126	295,606	Ring of Independents	304,488	1
Bern	29	647,126	295,606	Evangelical People's Party	287,983	1
Bern	29	647,126	295,606	Christian Democratic People's Party	281,787	1
Bern	29	647,126	295,606	National Action	269,612	1
Bern	29	647,126	295,606	Swiss Motorists' Party	267,032	1
Bern	29	647,126	295,606	Federal Democratic Union	229,815	0
Bern	29	647,126	295,606	Green Alliance	219,025	0
Bern	29	647,126	295,606	Ecological Freedom Party	120,613	0
Bern	29	647,126	295,606	Bern Interest Group for Civil-Commercial Politics	50,185	0
Bern	29	647,126	295,606	Pensioners also have a say!	19,762	0
Bern	29	647,126	295,606	Young List Emmental	15,255	0
Bern	29	647,126	295,606	Civic Voters for Nature and the Environment	10,525	0
Bern	29	647,126	295,606	Party of Transparency in Politics	7,428	0
Fribourg	6	130,898	60,624	Christian Democratic People's Party	132,811	3
Fribourg	6	130,898	60,624	Social Democratic Party	78,196	1
Fribourg	6	130,898	60,624	Free Democratic Party	58,769	1
Fribourg	6	130,898	60,624	Swiss People's Party	31,201	1
Fribourg	6	130,898	60,624	Independent Social-Christian Party	24,236	0
Fribourg	6	130,898	60,624	Ecological Freedom Party	14,741	0
Fribourg	6	130,898	60,624	Green Alliance	5,989	0
Fribourg	6	130,898	60,624	Grand Union List	4,773	0
Fribourg	6	130,898	60,624	German Fribourg Party	1,782	0
Geneva	11	193,566	74,624	Social Democratic Party	145,478	2
Geneva	11	193,566	74,624	Liberal Party	141,547	3
Geneva	11	193,566	74,624	Free Democratic Party	141,189	2
Geneva	11	193,566	74,624	Christian Democratic People's Party	114,323	2
Geneva	11	193,566	74,624	Green Party	90,409	1
Geneva	11	193,566	74,624	Party of Labour	68,292	1
Geneva	11	193,566	74,624	Republican Movement	54,383	0
Geneva	11	193,566	74,624	Legalize Cannabis	11,795	0
Geneva	11	193,566	74,624	National Action	8,331	0
Geneva	11	193,566	74,624	Ecological Freedom Party	4,652	0
Geneva	11	193,566	74,624	Social Liberal European Federalist Party	2,960	0
Glarus	1	23,506	5,336	Swiss People's Party	4,089	1
Glarus	1	23,506	5,336	Others	687	0
Grisons	5	111,885	44,181	Christian Democratic People's Party	61,806	2
Grisons	5	111,885	44,181	Swiss People's Party	43,409	1
Grisons	5	111,885	44,181	Social Democratic Party	42,469	1
Grisons	5	111,885	44,181	Free Democratic Party	39,647	1
Grisons	5	111,885	44,181	Free Citizens' List	13,942	0
Grisons	5	111,885	44,181	Green Alliance	13,147	0
Grisons	5	111,885	44,181	Ecological Freedom Party	2,793	0
Jura	2	43,587	22,491	Free Democratic Party	14,861	1
Jura	2	43,587	22,491	Christian Democratic People's Party	14,681	1
Jura	2	43,587	22,491	Social Democratic Party	11,319	0
Jura	2	43,587	22,491	Independent Social-Christian Party	3,581	0
Lucerne	9	205,188	111,309	Christian Democratic People's Party	461,535	5
Lucerne	9	205,188	111,309	Free Democratic Party	292,530	3
Lucerne	9	205,188	111,309	Social Democratic Party	88,472	1
Lucerne	9	205,188	111,309	Green Alliance	85,562	0
Lucerne	9	205,188	111,309	Swiss Motorists' Party	33,579	0
Lucerne	9	205,188	111,309	National Action	14,120	0
Lucerne	9	205,188	111,309	Ecological Freedom Party	4,096	0
Lucerne	9	205,188	111,309	Tell 2000	1,773	0
Neuchâtel	5	99,384	37,175	Social Democratic Party	55,780	2
Neuchâtel	5	99,384	37,175	Liberal Party	54,193	2
Neuchâtel	5	99,384	37,175	Free Democratic Party	36,994	1
Neuchâtel	5	99,384	37,175	Green Party	12,279	0
Neuchâtel	5	99,384	37,175	Free List	8,110	0
Neuchâtel	5	99,384	37,175	Party of Labour	6,802	0
Neuchâtel	5	99,384	37,175	National Action	6,173	0
Nidwalden	1	22,112	5,175	Christian Democratic People's Party	3,992	1
Nidwalden	1	22,112	5,175	Others	129	0
Obwalden	1	18,532	9,437	Christian Democratic People's Party	4,771	1
Obwalden	1	18,532	9,437	Free Democratic Party	2,805	0
Obwalden	1	18,532	9,437	Others	1,605	0
Schaffhausen	2	46,272	32,217	Social Democratic Party	24,066	1
Schaffhausen	2	46,272	32,217	Free Democratic Party	21,064	1
Schaffhausen	2	46,272	32,217	Swiss People's Party	14,436	0
Schaffhausen	2	46,272	32,217	Federal Democratic Union	1,845	0
Schwyz	3	68,324	28,452	Christian Democratic People's Party	30,745	1
Schwyz	3	68,324	28,452	Free Democratic Party	20,194	1
Schwyz	3	68,324	28,452	Social Democratic Party	11,891	1
Schwyz	3	68,324	28,452	Critical Forum	10,013	0
Schwyz	3	68,324	28,452	Swiss People's Party	6,320	0
Schwyz	3	68,324	28,452	Swiss Motorists' Party	4,085	0
Solothurn	7	149,758	91,033	Free Democratic Party	226,001	3
Solothurn	7	149,758	91,033	Christian Democratic People's Party	156,117	2
Solothurn	7	149,758	91,033	Social Democratic Party	138,601	2
Solothurn	7	149,758	91,033	Green Party	46,724	0
Solothurn	7	149,758	91,033	Swiss Motorists' Party	30,680	0
Solothurn	7	149,758	91,033	Ring of Independents	22,066	0
Solothurn	7	149,758	91,033	Party of Labour	2,035	0
St. Gallen	12	257,455	112,230	Christian Democratic People's Party	522,650	6
St. Gallen	12	257,455	112,230	Free Democratic Party	318,140	3
St. Gallen	12	257,455	112,230	Social Democratic Party	151,068	2
St. Gallen	12	257,455	112,230	Ring of Independents	133,135	1
St. Gallen	12	257,455	112,230	Green Alliance	70,596	0
St. Gallen	12	257,455	112,230	Swiss Motorists' Party	67,532	0
St. Gallen	12	257,455	112,230	Evangelical People's Party	30,496	0
St. Gallen	12	257,455	112,230	National Action	28,082	0
St. Gallen	12	257,455	112,230	Group for Integral Politics	1,772	0
St. Gallen	12	257,455	112,230	New Movement	1,322	0
Ticino	8	169,279	101,887	Christian Democratic People's Party	301,833	4
Ticino	8	169,279	101,887	Free Democratic Party	285,031	3
Ticino	8	169,279	101,887	Autonomous Socialist Party	86,787	1
Ticino	8	169,279	101,887	Social Democratic Party	73,182	0
Ticino	8	169,279	101,887	Green Party	15,086	0
Ticino	8	169,279	101,887	Swiss People's Party	9,871	0
Ticino	8	169,279	101,887	Party of Labour	9,341	0
Ticino	8	169,279	101,887	Ecological Freedom Party	7,250	0
Ticino	8	169,279	101,887	Socialist Green Alternative	7,042	0
Ticino	8	169,279	101,887	Via Libera	2,365	0
Ticino	8	169,279	101,887	Radical Anti-Mafia Ecological Party	1,679	0
Thurgau	6	120,550	58,487	Swiss People's Party	75,322	2
Thurgau	6	120,550	58,487	Christian Democratic People's Party	71,000	1
Thurgau	6	120,550	58,487	Social Democratic Party	46,673	1
Thurgau	6	120,550	58,487	Free Democratic Party	64,231	1
Thurgau	6	120,550	58,487	Green Party	37,472	1
Thurgau	6	120,550	58,487	Swiss Motorists' Party	22,065	0
Thurgau	6	120,550	58,487	For Law and Justice	18,909	0
Thurgau	6	120,550	58,487	Ring of Independents	9,096	0
Thurgau	6	120,550	58,487	Fresh Wind	1,776	0
Thurgau	6	120,550	58,487	Green Alliance	722	0
Uri	1	23,343	10,793	Free Democratic Party	8,765	1
Uri	1	23,343	10,793	Swiss Motorists' Party	170	0
Uri	1	23,343	10,793	Others	902	0
Vaud	17	333,224	124,630	Free Democratic Party	567,827	6
Vaud	17	333,224	124,630	Social Democratic Party	464,006	6
Vaud	17	333,224	124,630	Liberal Party	357,275	3
Vaud	17	333,224	124,630	Green Party	172,073	1
Vaud	17	333,224	124,630	Swiss People's Party	127,916	1
Vaud	17	333,224	124,630	Christian Democratic People's Party	84,134	0
Vaud	17	333,224	124,630	Socialist Green Alternative	75,574	0
Vaud	17	333,224	124,630	Party of Labour	71,979	0
Vaud	17	333,224	124,630	National Action	57,326	0
Vaud	17	333,224	124,630	Federal Democratic Union	22,940	0
Vaud	17	333,224	124,630	Legalize Cannabis	21,087	0
Vaud	17	333,224	124,630	Humanist Independent List	19,657	0
Vaud	17	333,224	124,630	Social Liberal European Federalist Party	10,291	0
Vaud	17	333,224	124,630	Patriotic Union	5,660	0
Valais	7	155,139	92,529	Christian Democratic People's Party	366,632	4
Valais	7	155,139	92,529	Free Democratic Party	153,333	2
Valais	7	155,139	92,529	Social Democratic Party	90,800	1
Valais	7	155,139	92,529	Green Party	10,328	0
Valais	7	155,139	92,529	Legalize Cannabis	3,579	0
Zug	2	52,674	24,460	Christian Democratic People's Party	16,561	1
Zug	2	52,674	24,460	Free Democratic Party	16,478	1
Zug	2	52,674	24,460	Social Democratic Party	10,911	0
Zug	2	52,674	24,460	Green Alliance	3,783	0
Zug	2	52,674	24,460	Social Liberal European Federalist Party	624	0
Zürich	35	740,438	351,688	Free Democratic Party	2,477,532	8
Zürich	35	740,438	351,688	Social Democratic Party	2,125,218	6
Zürich	35	740,438	351,688	Swiss People's Party	1,853,712	6
Zürich	35	740,438	351,688	Ring of Independents	1,411,707	4
Zürich	35	740,438	351,688	Green Party	979,270	3
Zürich	35	740,438	351,688	Christian Democratic People's Party	869,292	2
Zürich	35	740,438	351,688	National Action	605,840	2
Zürich	35	740,438	351,688	Evangelical People's Party	532,088	2
Zürich	35	740,438	351,688	Green Alliance	467,859	1
Zürich	35	740,438	351,688	Swiss Motorists' Party	457,963	1
Zürich	35	740,438	351,688	Federal Democratic Union	214,523	0
Zürich	35	740,438	351,688	Republican Movement	58,258	0
Zürich	35	740,438	351,688	Party of Labour	32,147	0
Zürich	35	740,438	351,688	Reasonable Traffic Policy for A Better Environment	19,681	0
Zürich	35	740,438	351,688	Women's Movement "Mother and Child"	14,897	0
Zürich	35	740,438	351,688	Pro Solar	14,369	0
Zürich	35	740,438	351,688	Humanist Party	12,916	0
Zürich	35	740,438	351,688	Young Environmentally Conscious Democratic List	9,875	0
Zürich	35	740,438	351,688	Social Liberal European Federalist Party	9,737	0
Zürich	35	740,438	351,688	Sensible Agricultural and Consumer Politics	9,483	0
Zürich	35	740,438	351,688	Ecological Freedom Party	7,864	0
Zürich	35	740,438	351,688	Dynamic Center	4,476	0
Source: Bundesblatt, 24 November 1987

=== Council of the States ===
Party	Seats	+/–
Christian Democratic People's Party	19	+1
Free Democratic Party	14	0
Social Democratic Party	5	–1
Swiss People's Party	4	–1
Liberal Party	3	0
Alliance of Independents	1	+1
Total	46	0
Source: Nohlen & Stöver
