= Alfred Roch =

Swiss cross-country skier (1925–2023)

Charles Alfred Roch (8 June 1925 – 1 August 2023) was a Swiss cross-country skier who competed in the 1950s. He finished 16th in the 50 km event at the 1952 Winter Olympics in Oslo. Roch was born in Lausanne on 8 June 1925, and died in Pontcharra on 1 August 2023, at the age of 98.
