= Pietro Martinelli (politician) =

Swiss politician (born 1934)

Member of the Council of State of the Canton of Ticino
- In office 1987–1999

Member of the Grand Council of Ticino
- In office 1967–1987

Personal details
- Born: 6 February 1934 (age 92) Lugano, Switzerland
- Party: PS; PSA
- Education: ETH Zurich
- Occupation: Politician, engineer

Pietro Martinelli (born 6 February 1934) is a Swiss engineer and communist politician.

== Biography ==
Born in Lugano and educated at ETH Zurich, Martinelli became active in the political scene of the Canton of Ticino in the early 1960s, serving as the leader of the Federation of Ticino Young Socialists in 1964. In 1967, Martinelli was elected to the Grand Council of Ticino. Following a split in the Social Democratic Party (PS) in 1969, Martinelli and fellow communist Werner Carobbio founded a new Marxist-oriented party in Ticino, called the Autonomous Socialist Party (PSA). In 1987, he became PSA's only member in the cantonal Council of State, holding this seat until his retirement in 1999.
