= Léonard Gianadda =

Swiss journalist and engineer (1935–2023)

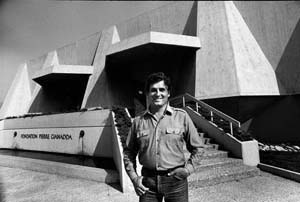
Gianadda in 1984 (by Erling Mandelmann)

Léonard Gianadda (23 August 1935 – 3 December 2023) was a Swiss journalist (TSR), engineer, and philanthropist. He was the founder and president of the Fondation Pierre Gianadda.

== Life and career ==
Born in Martigny in 1935, Gianadda got his Engineering diploma in 1961 at the École Polytechnique Fédérale de Lausanne. From 1961, Gianadda ran his own engineering agency and built more than a thousand apartments in Martigny. He founded the Fondation Pierre Gianadda in 1978 after his brother Pierre died in 1976.

Gianadda died of bone cancer on 3 December 2023, at the age of 88.

== Awards ==
In 1990 he received the Order of Merit of the Italian Republic. In 1997 he was made an Officier de l'Ordre des Arts et des Lettres. In 2001 he received The National Order of the Legion of Honour and in 2003 he became an associated member of the Institut de France and the Académie des Beaux-Arts.
