= Guide Hachette des Vins =

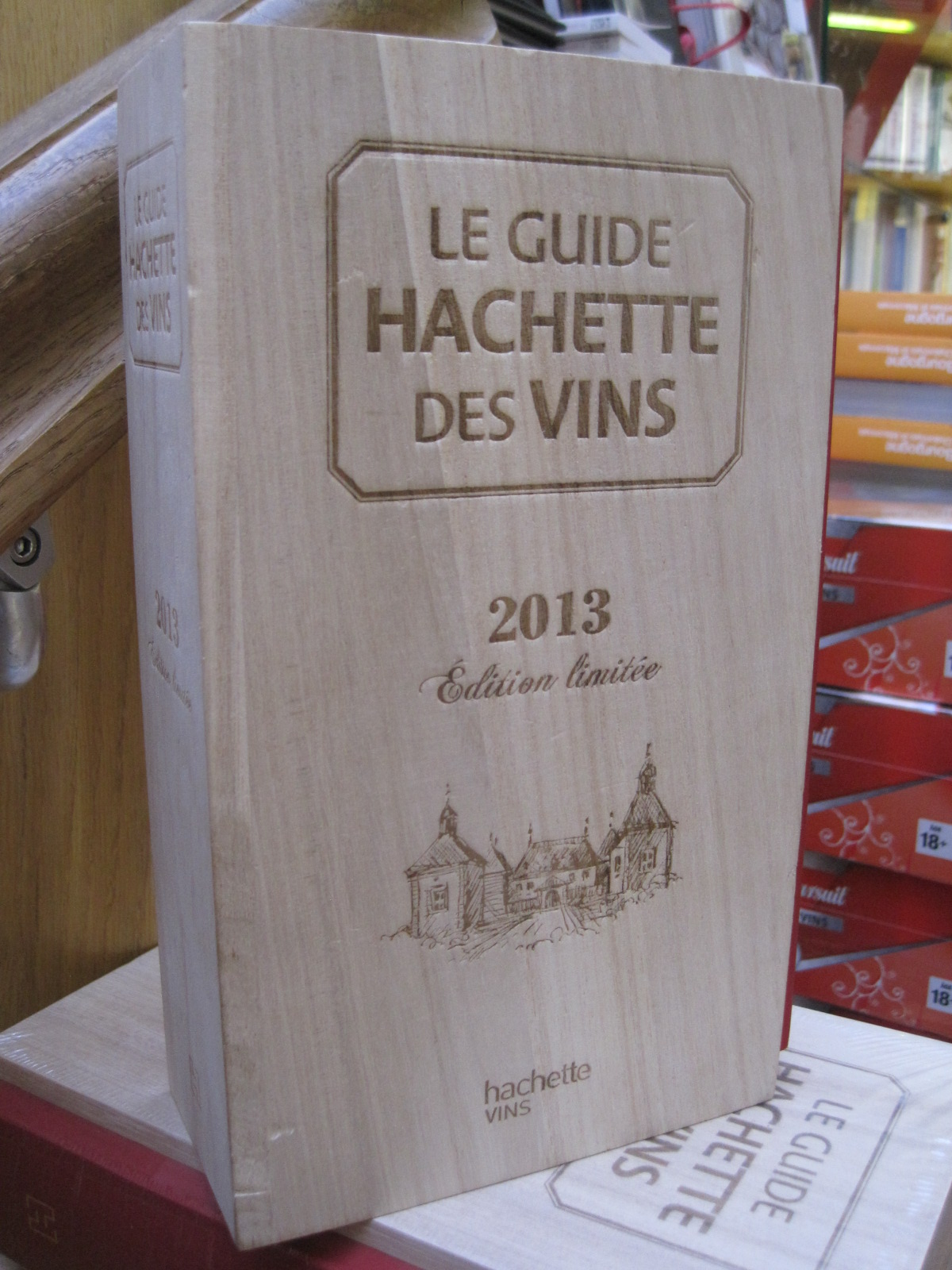
Hachette Wine Guide, carved in wood

The Guide Hachette des Vins is a French wine buying guide published by Hachette Livre (Hachette Pratique). Its first edition was released in 1985. It is France's best-selling wine guide and one of France's oldest. The Guide Hachette des Vins is considered to be France' most authoritative guide and commonly referred to as the bible of the French wine industry.

== Blind tasting panels ==
The Guide Hachette uses blind tasting panels to evaluate wines by appellation. Each year 40,000 wines are tasted blind and rated by experts.

No fee is required to submit samples. Only the most recently bottled vintage is allowed to be submitted for blind tasting.

Wine tastings are organized locally in each region between January and May. Blind tasting sessions composed of a panel wine professionals (enologists, wine merchants, wine brokers, sommeliers) are organized with the Syndicat Viticole or Winegrower's Syndicate of each appellation present in the guide.

== Rating system ==
Each wine is rated on a scale of 0 to 5.

Taster's grade	Wine Quality	Final Wine Rating
0	Faulty wine	Eliminated
1	Poor or mediocre	Eliminated
2	Good	Commended (no stars)
3	Excellent	*
4	Remarkable	**
5	Exceptional	***

The top rated wines are subject to a second round of blind tasting. After the second tasting, the panel votes on one or two wines to receive Coup de Coeur [Judges' Favorite]. The Coup de Coeur is considered to be the highest recommendation.

== Regions covered ==
The 2016 edition covers:

- Alsace and Lorraine
- Beaujolais and Lyonnais
- Bordeaux
- Burgundy
- Champagne
- Jura, Savoie, Bugey
- Languedoc and Roussillon
- Poitou and Charentes
- Provence and Corsica
- South-west France
- Loire Valley and Central
- Rhône Valley
- Vin de Pays/IGP (Indication géographique protégée)
- Luxembourg
