= Freedom Party of Switzerland =

- German name: Freiheits-Partei der Schweiz (FPS)
- French name: Parti Suisse de la Liberté (PSL)
- Italian name: Partito svizzero della Libertà (PSL)
- Romansh name: Partida Svizra da la Libertad (PSL)
- President: Jürg Scherrer
- Founded: 1984
- Headquarters: Bern
- Ideology: Swiss nationalism Conservatism; National liberalism Right-wing populism Euroscepticism
- Political position: Right-wing
- Colours: Red and black

The Freedom Party of Switzerland (FPS) (German: Freiheits-Partei der Schweiz; French: Parti suisse de la liberté, PSL) is a minor right-wing populist political party in Switzerland. Its president and leading representative is Jürg Scherrer, formerly the head of the security department in the city government of Biel/Bienne until 2008. The party is against much government involvement in the economy, especially environmental regulations, but is for strict controls on immigration and strict punishments for selling drugs. The party opposes Swiss EU membership.

== History ==
The FPS was founded 1984 in Zürich by Dr. Michael E. Dreher and other right-wing politicians as Autopartei (Automobile Party). It was intended to counter the then upsurging Green Party of Switzerland and the contemporary concerns about forest dieback due to acid rain. Focusing initially on personal mobility issues, one of its more well-known slogans was "Freie Fahrt für freie Bürger" (A free road for free citizens).

The party enjoyed success in the cantonal parliaments, particularly in St. Gallen, Thurgau and Schaffhausen. The height of its power was reached in the 1991 National Council elections, when it captured 8 out of 200 seats and 4% of the national vote. Afterwards, the party's fortunes started to decline as many leading figures left the party in the course of internal disputes, mainly for the more mainstream Swiss People's Party.

Despite renaming itself to "Freedom Party" in 1994, the FPS lost all national mandates in the 1999 elections and, as of 2006, retains but a very few parliamentary seats in some cantonal and municipal parliaments. Most of its members, and even entire sections have joined the Swiss People's Party which has incorporated most of the party's agenda.

== Agenda ==
The FPS campaigns on a pronounced right-wing agenda, advocating strict asylum and immigration laws, as well as a law and order approach to crime and drugs and strong Armed Forces. It opposes Swiss membership in international organisations such as the European Union and the United Nations (however it favors EFTA and even NAFTA membership), but favors a laissez-faire economic policy, deregulation, tax cuts and a reduction of state spending.

The party and its exponents are also noted for their aggressive anti-communist rhetoric, at least compared to that of mainstream Swiss parties. Its leader Jürg Scherrer has been (unsuccessfully) sued several times under Swiss anti-discrimination laws on account of his disparaging statements about Africans and foreigners in general. The following excerpts from a statement of Scherrer's, posted on the party's website in 2006, may serve to illustrate the party's take on current issues:

No other people in the world are as much lied to and duped by a Leftist-subverted government as the Swiss. ... The unhampered wave of immigration of the last ten years has caused criminality and drug problems in Switzerland to escalate drastically. ... We want to act now. Emergency law must be used to close the Swiss border to any immigration from outside the EU/EFTA states, with exceptions for the labour market only. Criminal foreigners must be extradited immediately. International agreements that forbid this must be terminated. If we don't clean up now, it will be too late tomorrow.
