= Ursula Cantieni =

Swiss-German actress (1947–2023)

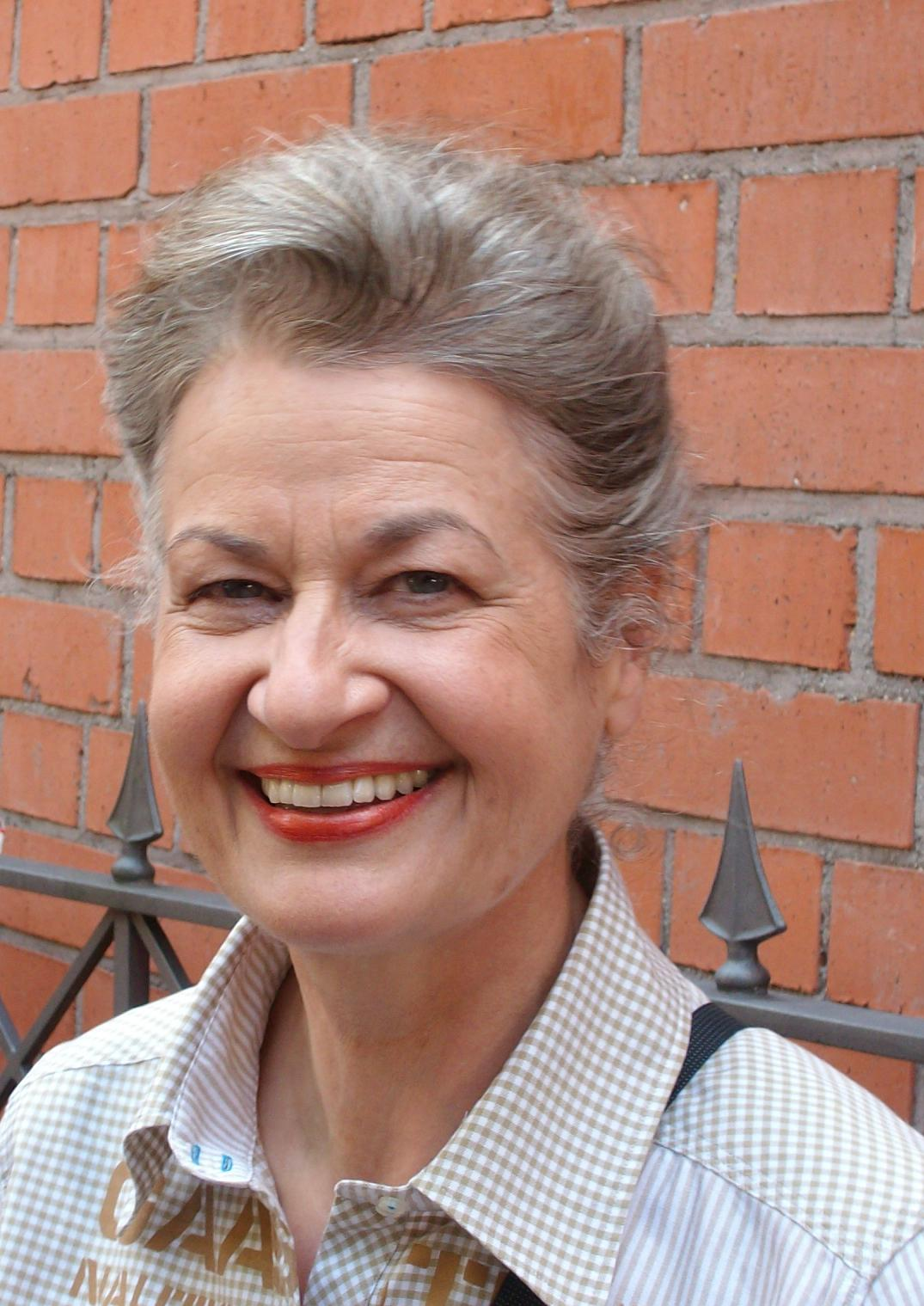
Cantieni in 2009

Ursula Cantieni (5 December 1947, Zürich – 15 August 2023) was a Swiss-German actress known for her role on Die Fallers – Die SWR Schwarzwaldserie.

Cantieni was born on 5 December 1947, and died on 15 August 2023, at the age of 75.
