= Willy Pfund =

Swiss politician (1939–2023)

Member of the Swiss National Council
- In office 28 November 1983 – 29 November 1987

Personal details
- Born: 18 August 1939
- Died: 10 October 2023 (aged 84)
- Party: Liberal

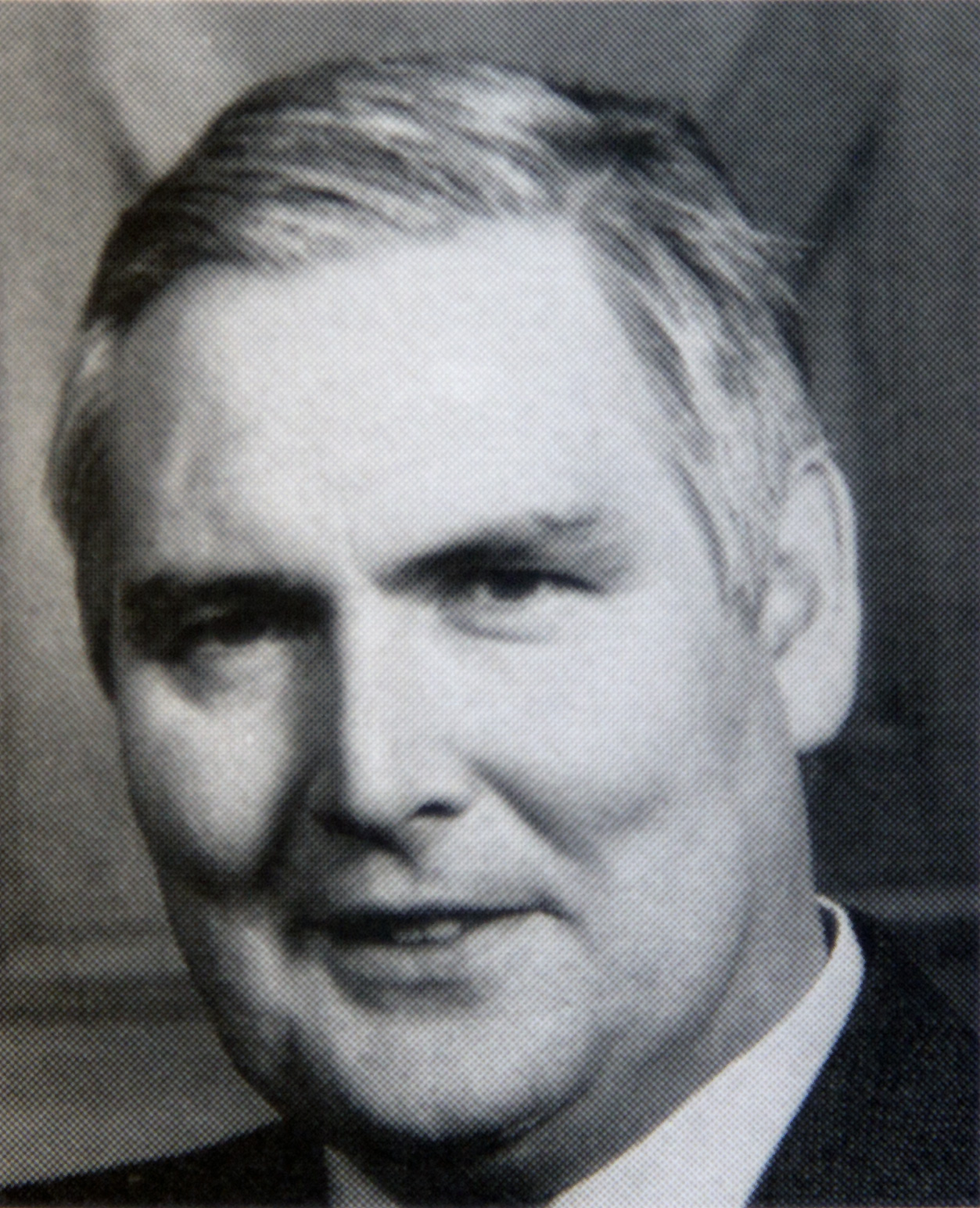
Portrait of Willy Pfund

Willy Pfund (18 August 1939 – 10 October 2023) was a Swiss politician of the Liberal Party.

== Biography ==
Pfund served as a hospital director in Basel. He lived in Dornach.

In 1983, Pfund was elected to the National Council with the Liberal Party. He ran as a candidate for the Executive Council of Solothurn, facing FDP politician Cornelia Füeg. However, he was unsuccessful and left political life.

In 2002, Pfund became president of ProTell, an association advocating for the right to possess firearms in Switzerland. He was criticized for his autocratic leadership style and resigned as president in September 2016. He was succeeded by Jean-Luc Addor and named honorary president in 2018.

Willy Pfund died on 10 October 2023, at the age of 84.
