= Max Huwyler =

Swiss writer (1931–2023)

- Born: 6 December 1931; Zug, Switzerland
- Died: 28 January 2023 (aged 91)
- Occupations: Radio scriptwriter, novelist, poet
- Writing career
- Genres: Fantasy, poetry, children's literature, young-adult Fiction
- Website: autillus.ch/plattforms/Huwyler_Max.html

Max Huwyler (6 December 1931 – 28 January 2023) was a Swiss writer.

== Biography ==
Originally, Huwyler was a high school teacher in Zürich. He wrote several books for children, theatre plays, poetry, fiction stories, and radio plays. He co-authored with Walter Flückiger a book in the volumes titled Welt der Wörter (World of Words) in 1983. His works include further texts for children, plays for the school stage, radio plays, poems, and children's books. He also translated plays by Elias Canetti and Günter Grass into Swiss German.

Huwyler was awarded the Swiss Youth Book Award in 1993, the Schiller Foundation Award in 1996 and the Recognition Award of the Zug Canton, the Central Swiss Media Award of the DRS Radio and the Zons Radio Drama Award in 2004.

== Publications ==
- 2010: Das Zebra ist das Zebra Illustrated by Jürg Obrist. Atlantis-Verlag, Zürich, ISBN 978-3-7152-0581-6.
- 2003: D'Bremer Stadtmusikante und d'Gschicht vom föifte Bremer. Hörspiel Produktion, Zürich, ISBN 978-3-03739-014-6.
- 2000: De Stadtgarteschnägg script author. Zytglogge, Bern, ISBN 978-3-7296-0585-5.
- 1997: Das Nashorn und das Nashorn Wrote with Vera Eggermann. Zytglogge, Bern, ISBN 978-3-7296-0557-2.
- 1983: Welt der Wörter Wrote with Walter Flückiger, Lehrmittelverlag, Zürich, ISBN 390-674302-0.
