= Jeanlouis Cornuz =

Jeanlouis Cornuz (February 17, 1922 – October 14, 2007) was a Swiss writer.

== Biography ==
Jeanlouis Cornuz was born in Lausanne, Switzerland. He studied literature at the University of Lausanne and at the University of Zürich. In 1946, at age 24, he worked as an interpreter during the Nuremberg international trials of Nazi German officials involved in the Holocaust. He then taught literature in Switzerland at state gymnasiums (Gymnase de la Cité in Lausanne and Gymnase de Chamblandes in Pully), and also worked as a teacher in the United States of America. A skilled chess player, Cornuz was a respected columnist and journalist, contributing to various newspapers and magazines in Switzerland. From 1995 to 1998, he served as a benevolent editor-in-chief for the monthly l'Essor magazine. Additionally, he was politically active, representing the left-wing Popular Workers' Party (POP) as a delegate in the Canton de Vaud parliament. As a POP delegate, Jeanlouis Cornuz played a role in Swiss politics, advocating for workers’ rights and social equality. His political work aligned closely with the ethos of authors he admired, like Victor Hugo, whose writings were often politically charged. Throughout his career, Cornuz authored numerous essays on prominent figures such as Jules Michelet, André Dhôtel, Gottfried Keller and Victor Hugo. He also contributed to radio and stage drama, alongside writing several novels. As a Germanist, Cornuz translated works by notable authors like Ernst Wiechert, Walter Diggelmann, Urs Schwarz, Wolfgang Leonhard, and Gottfried Keller from German into French.

== Novels ==
- La vieille femme, Ed. du Viaduc, 1954 (Roman) OCLC 84132906
- Le réfractaire, Rencontre, 1964 (Roman) OCLC 49486851
- Parce que c'était toi, La Baconnière, 1966. (Roman) OCLC 156912362
- Les USA à l'heure du LSD, La Baconnière, 1968. OCLC 7563584
- Reconnaissance d'Edmond Gilliard, L'Age d'homme, 1975
- Jean-Claude Stehli, Centre d'art Les Fontaines, 1978
- La Grande année 1968; ill. Thierry Rollier, Ed. de la Thièle, 1979
- Le Professeur, Favre, 1981. (Roman)
- Portraits sans réserve, Plaisir de lire, 1983
- Olsommer; en collab. avec Fabienne Luisier, Centre d'art Les Fontaines, 1998
- Les désastres de la guerre, L'Age d'homme, 1994. (Roman)
- Les caprices : Les désastres de la guerre II, L'Age d'homme, 2000
- Le complexe de Laïos : Les désastres de la guerre III, L'Age d'homme, 2003

== Awards ==
- 1981 Vaud canton writers award

== Bibliography ==
- Roger Francillon, Histoire de la littérature en Suisse romande, vol 3, p. 328. OCLC 36411600
- Alain Nicollier, Henri-Charles Dahlem, Dictionnaire des écrivains suisses d'expression française, vol 1, pp. 282. OCLC 32131872
