= Hans Rudolf Gysin =

Swiss politician (1940–2023)

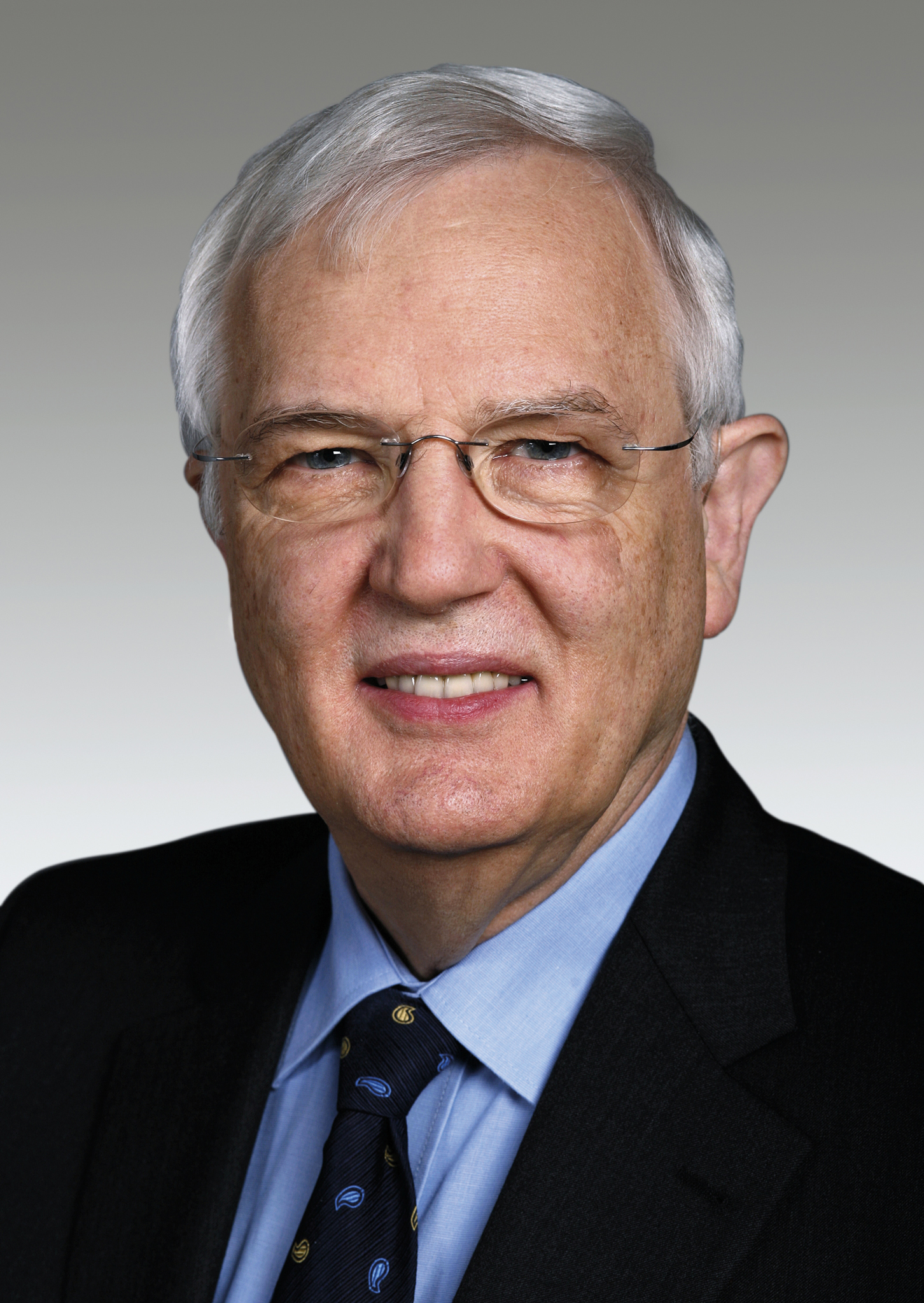
- Gysin in 2007

Member of the Swiss National Council
- In office 30 November 1987 – 4 December 2011

Personal details
- Born: 29 December 1940 Basel, Switzerland
- Died: 19 August 2023 (aged 82)
- Party: FDP

Hans Rudolf Gysin (29 December 1940 – 19 August 2023) was a Swiss politician. A member of the Free Democratic Party, he served in the Swiss National Council from 1987 to 2011.

Gysin died on 19 August 2023, at the age of 82.
