= Michael E. Dreher =

Swiss politician (1944–2023)

Michael E. Dreher (8 January 1944 – 22 May 2023) was a Swiss right-wing politician, and founder of the Freedom Party of Switzerland (originally "Motorist Party", German: Auto-Partei). He held an MBA from University of St. Gallen and was an MP from 1987 to 1999.

== Political life ==
Dreher championed individual freedom, tax breaks, and individual mobility and adhered to the principles of Euroscepticism and Capitalism. He called for strict regulations on immigration, and the prevalence of law and order. However, he did not back the death penalty. In his early days, he joined the Free Democratic Party of Switzerland. In the 1970s he served as a secretary of the Neutral Nations Supervisory Commission in Panmunjom, Korea with the rank of a Swiss army captain; he traveled extensively in East Asia and Eastern Europe. In 1979 he was a candidate in national elections for the first time. In the 1980s he created a pressure group under the name "Buergeraktion" (People's Action) and aggressively supported candidates of Switzerland's center-right majority parties. Dreher countered the rise of the Green Party of Switzerland and particularly rebuked its claims about Forest dieback which he denounced as the "lie of the century". His verbal attacks on the "reds and greens" were often rude, and rocked the political establishment of Switzerland. He opposed Swiss EU and UNO membership, but supported membership of Switzerland in North American Free Trade Agreement and European Free Trade Association for the purpose of free trade. In 1985 he left the FDP and founded the Motorist Party. He was a national MP from 1987 to 1999, and joined the Swiss People's Party which took up many of his ideas in 2001. He was the publisher of the capitalist magazine "Tacho" which promoted the cause of taxpayers and motorists, and President of the Motorist Foundation ("Auto-Allianz").

== Personal life and death ==
Dreher was a legal and economic consultant, based in Zollikon, a ritzy Zürich suburb. He was married, had one son and lived in Küsnacht. He was a member of Scaphusia Schaffhausen and an admirer of US President Ronald Reagan and UK Prime Minister Margaret Thatcher. Almost naturally, Dreher had a flair for cars and a collection of old-timers.

Dreher died on 22 May 2023, at the age of 79.

Organization

- Freedom Party of Switzerland
- Swiss People's Party
