= Hans Mössmer =

Austrian ice hockey player (1932–2023)

Personal information
- Nationality: Austrian
- Born: 22 March 1932; Innsbruck, Austria
- Died: 10 June 2023 (aged 91); Innsbruck, Austria

Sport
- Sport: Ice hockey

Hans Mössmer (22 March 1932 – 10 June 2023) was an Austrian ice hockey player. He competed in the men's tournament at the 1956 Winter Olympics. Mössmer died in Innsbruck on 10 June 2023, at the age of 91.
