= Peter Facklam =

Swiss politician (1930–2023)

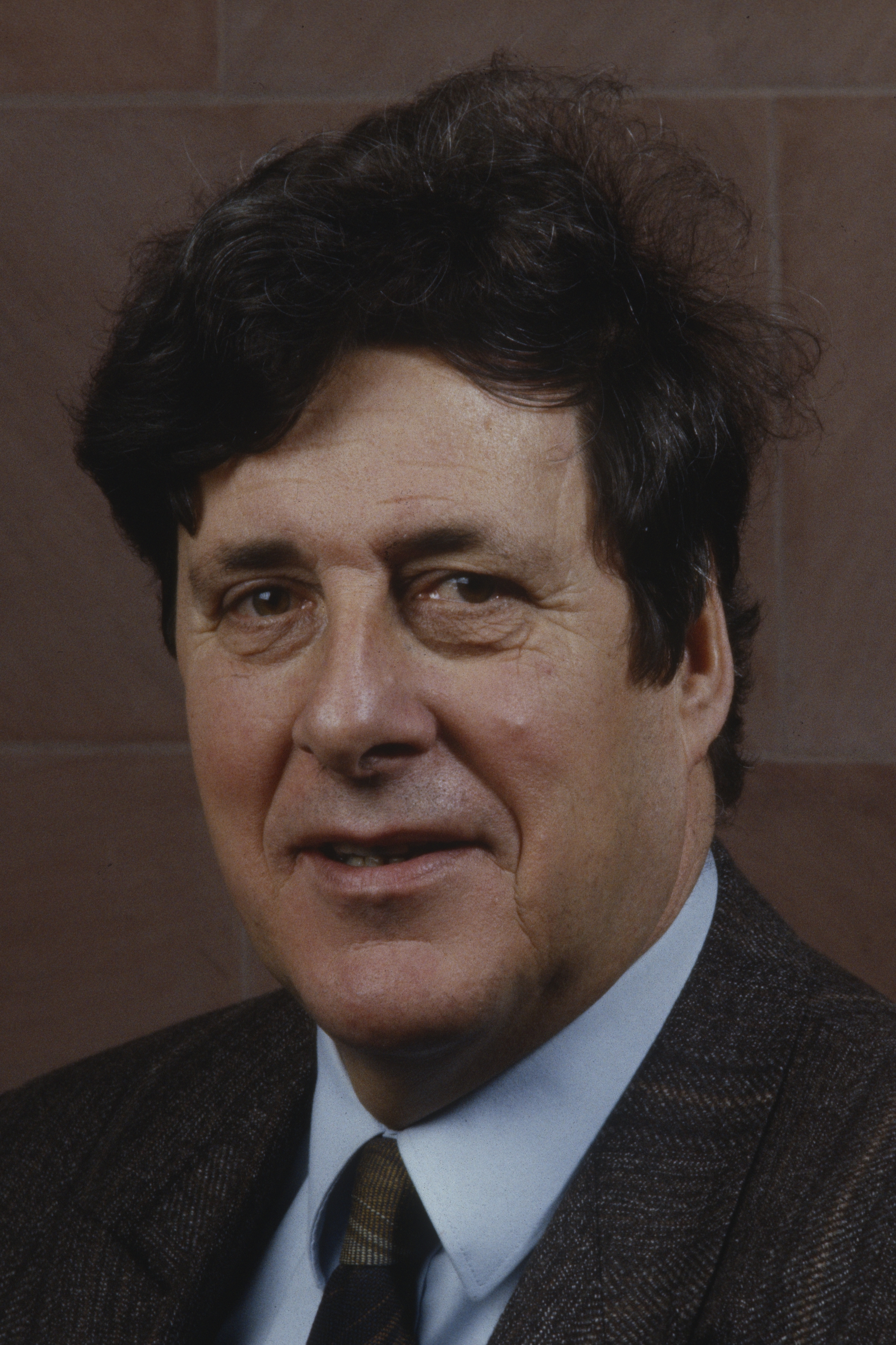
- Facklam in 1987

Member of the Executive Council of Basel-Stadt
- In office 1980–1992

Personal details
- Born: 23 April 1930 Basel, Switzerland
- Died: 2 February 2023 (aged 92) Basel, Switzerland
- Party: LDP
- Education: University of Basel; University of Geneva

Peter Facklam (23 April 1930 – 2 February 2023) was a Swiss politician. A member of the Liberal-Demokratische Partei, he served in the Executive Council of Basel-Stadt from 1980 to 1992.

Facklam died in Basel on 2 February 2023, at the age of 92.
