= Susi Eppenberger =

Swiss politician (1931–2023)

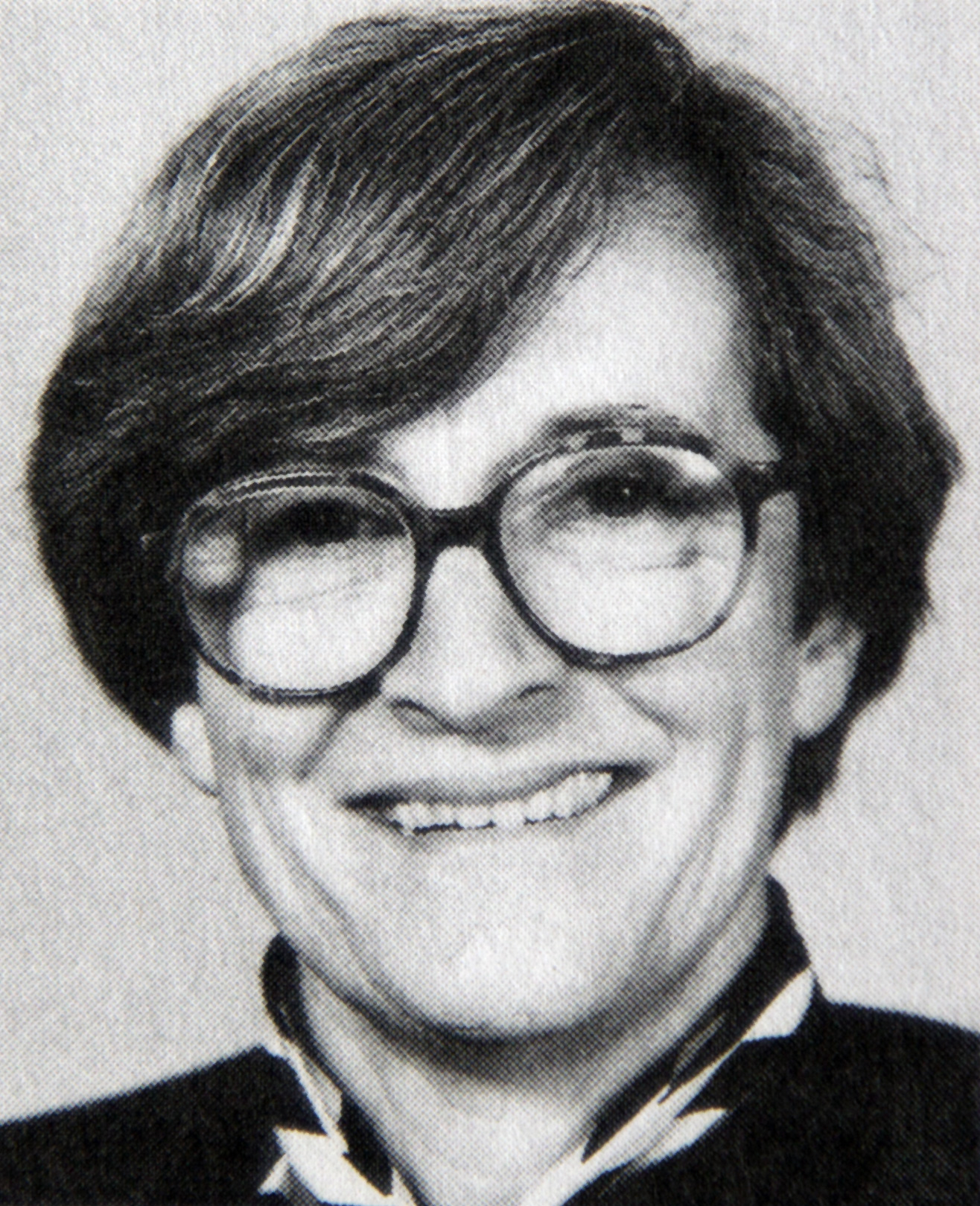

Member of the Swiss National Council
- In office 5 June 1979 – 24 November 1991
- Preceded by: Ruedi Schatz

Personal details
- Born: Susanna Eppenberger; 18 October 1931 Herisau, Switzerland
- Died: 5 November 2023 (aged 92) Speicher, Switzerland
- Party: FDP
- Education: Kantonsschule am Burggraben

Susanna Eppenberger-Egger (18 October 1931 – 5 November 2023) was a Swiss politician. A member of the Free Democratic Party, she served in the National Council from 1979 to 1991.

== Early life ==
Eppenberger was born on 18 October 1931 in Herisau. Her father was the owner of a construction business and was also in politics as a member of the Cantonal Council of Appenzell Ausserrhoden. She was the eldest sibling of four girls and one boy, and they all grew up in Herisau. By 1950 she graduated with a diploma in commerce at the Cantonal School of St. Gallen. After graduating she briefly worked as a secretary in a law firm and in the industry, although she became a housewife upon marrying Eppenberger. In 1954, she married Willi Eppenberger, a veterinarian who was the lead the veterinary clinic in Nesslau.

Over the next decade, her and Willi had their daughter Kristiana and two sons, Matthias and Andreas. In 1970, her husband founded the Toggenburg Veterinary Clinic and Animal Shelter, where she became the administrative director.

== Political career ==
She first entered politics in 1972, being elected to the St. Gallen Grand Council as a member of the Liberal Democratic Party of Switzerland (FDP), where she was a member until 1980. Then, from 1979 to 1991, she became a member of the National Council. She succeeded the late Ruedi Schatz upon being elected. In 1991, when she chose not to run for election for a fourth term, there was a wider trend of the FDP also deciding not to renew half of its federal delegation.

== Death ==
Eppenberger died in Speicher on 5 November 2023, at the age of 92.
