= Werner Carobbio =

Swiss politician (1936–2023)

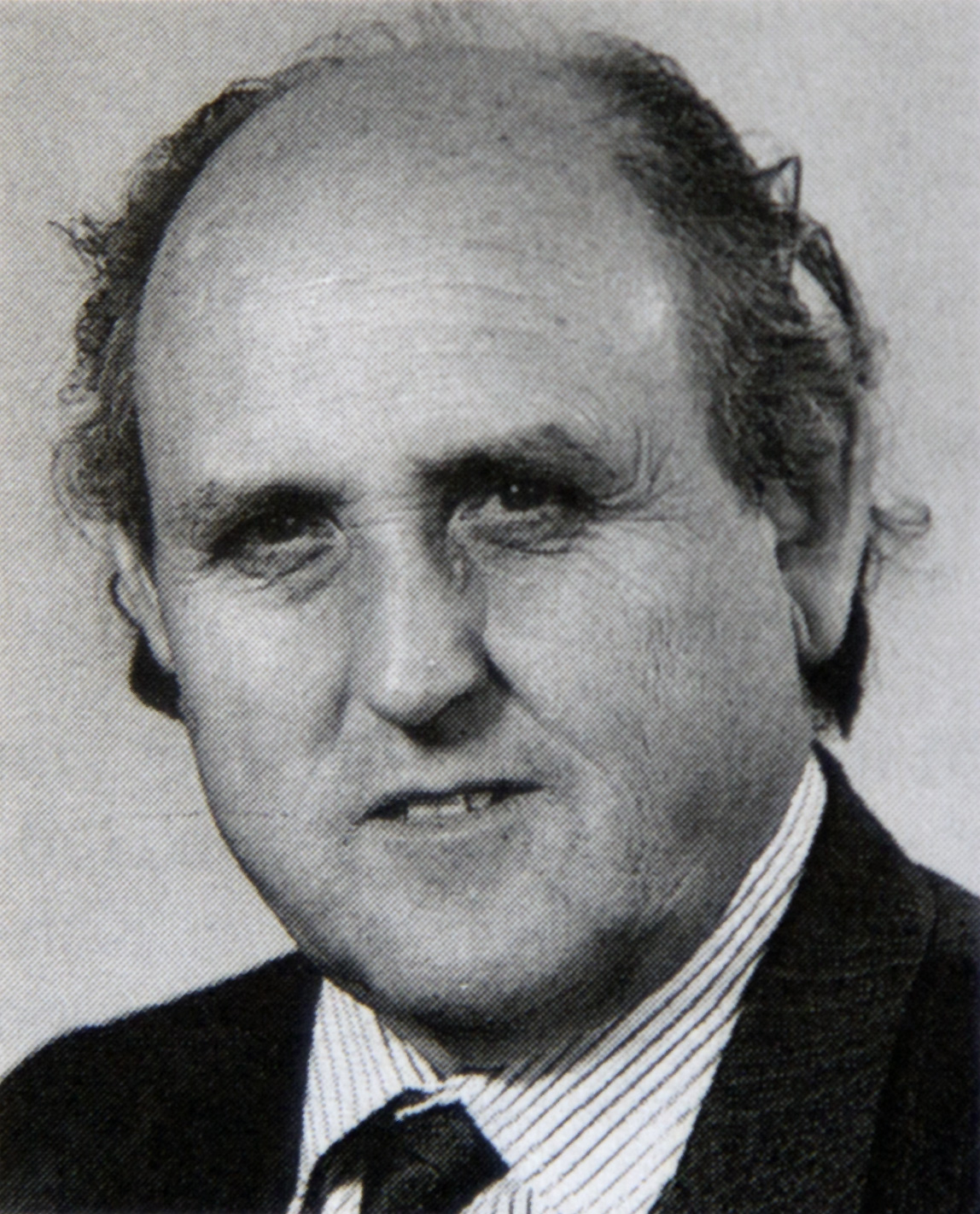

Member of the National Council of Switzerland
- In office 1975–1999

Personal details
- Born: 10 November 1936 Lumino, Switzerland
- Died: 7 November 2023 (aged 86)
- Party: PS; PSA
- Occupation: Politician

Werner Carobbio (10 November 1936 – 7 November 2023) was a Swiss socialist politician from Lumino.

== Biography ==
Prior to 1969, Carobbio was a member of the Social Democratic Party (PS) but was expelled from the party due to ideological differences. As a result, he founded the Marxist-oriented Autonomous Socialist Party (PSA) alongside Pietro Martinelli. In 1975, Carobbio was elected to the National Council for the PSA. In 1991, the PSA merged back into the PS, and Carobbio maintained his seat in the National Council, now representing PS, until his retirement in 1999. Carobbio died on 7 November 2023, at the age of 86.
