= Federal Office of Information Technology, Systems and Telecommunication =

Swiss government agency

Federal Office of Information Technology, Systems and Telecommunication FOITT
- (in German) Bundesamt für Informatik und Telekommunikation BIT (in French) Office fédéral de l’informatique et de la télécommunication OFIT (in Italian) Ufficio federale dell’informatica e della telecomunicazione UFIT (in Romansh) Uffizi federal d’informatica e da telecommunicaziun UFIT

Agency overview
- Jurisdiction: Federal administration of Switzerland
- Headquarters: Eichenweg 1-3 3052 Zollikofen; 46.9973719°N 7.46301°E
- Employees: 1,900
- Minister responsible: Karin Keller-Sutter, Federal Councillor
- Agency executives: Dirk Lindemann, Director; Philippe Voirol, Vice director
- Parent agency: Federal Department of Finance
- Website: bit.admin.ch

The Federal Office of Information Technology, Systems and Telecommunication (FOITT) (Note: German: Bundesamt für Informatik und Telekommunikation BIT, French: Office fédéral de l’informatique et de la télécommunication OFIT, Italian: Ufficio federale dell’informatica e della telecomunicazione UFIT, Romansh: Uffizi federal d’informatica e da telecommunicaziun UFIT) is the federal office responsible for providing IT services for the Swiss Federal Administration. It is subordinated to the Federal Department of Finance.

The FOITT is the largest IT service provider in the federal administration. In addition to the Federal Office for Cybersecurity, four other departments have their own service providers (ISC-EJPD for the FDJP, ISCeco for the EAER, IT EDA for the FDFA and Armed Forces Cyber Command for the DDPS). As a provider of standard services, the FOITT is responsible for telecommunications, the internet, business solutions, and operational security for the entire Federal Administration. It is responsible for operating data centers and specialist applications for three departments, managing over 60,000 standardized workstation systems for six departments and the Federal Chancellery, and operating data networks and telecommunications infrastructure for the entire Federal Administration. The FOITT supports business processes in the Federal Administration and ensures that telecommunications between all federal agencies in Switzerland and abroad function properly.

FOITT’s strategic priorities are the industrialization and standardization of IT production, the implementation of a scalable software factory, and a focus on value-added services. In addition, BIT aims to enhance its appeal as an IT employer and position itself as an attractive IT partner for the public sector.

In accordance with the transfer pricing concept, the FOITT charges service recipients for the total costs of service provision. In 2025, this generated CHF 887 million in revenue for the FOITT, with this revenue divided into CHF 604 million for ICT operating costs (Service Group 1, SG1) and CHF 283 million for ICT projects and services (Service Group 2, SG2). FOITT’s current revenue consisted mainly of internal cost allocations to administrative units within the central federal administration (CHF 827.9 million) for office automation, communications (networking and telephony), access rights and permissions, as well as the operation of several hundred applications. Revenue from services provided to third parties outside the central federal administration amounted to 58.8 million. Overall, current revenue increased by 147.5 million compared to the 2025 budget.

== Predecessor organizations ==
=== Central Office for Organizational Issues of the Federal Administration (ZOB) ===
After the federal administration of Switzerland had grown considerably during the Second World War, efforts were made in the immediate post-war period to reduce the size of the administration. In this context, staff cuts were made and further rationalization measures were introduced. In 1953, the Federal Council decided to set up a coordination office for cost-cutting and rationalization efforts within the federal administration. In 1954, the Federal Assembly (Swiss parliament) finally passed a federal law establishing a Central Office for Organisational Matters of the Federal Administration (ZOB), which was located in the Department of Finance and Customs and was tasked with reviewing the appropriateness and effectiveness of the organization and working methods of the federal administration and identifying opportunities for cost savings. The rapid development of electronics in the field of office machines prompted the Federal Council to pass a resolution on December 16, 1960, in which it expanded the ZOB's remit to include the coordination of all federal administration efforts in the field of automation and created a Coordination Office for Automation within the ZOB. Until the early 1970s, the federal administration had four general data centers: the Federal Administration Data Center, the Federal Military Department Data Center, the ETH Zurich Data Center, and the EPFL Data Center. In addition to the general data centers, there were still only a few decentralized data processing services with their own equipment and staff in 1973, such as the Meteorological Central Office in Zurich, the Central Compensation Office of the OASI in Geneva, the Federal Tax Administration, the Cashier's and Accounting Office, the Federal Customs Administration, the Institute for Nuclear Research, and the computer center of the construction workshop and ammunition factory in Thun. Overall, spending on IT equipment in the federal administration rose rapidly from around 10 million Swiss francs in 1963 to around 30 million Swiss francs in 1968, to around 140 million Swiss francs in 1973, and finally to around 214 million Swiss francs in 1978.

=== Federal Office for Organization (BFO) ===
In terms of organization, the ZOB, which was created in 1955, was upgraded to the Federal Office for Organization (BFO) in 1980, with its responsibility for IT confirmed. The corresponding task in the federal law of 1980 was: “Promotes, coordinates, and monitors automatic data processing and ensures overall planning.” In addition, the Federal Office was authorized to issue technical guidelines on the appropriate and economical use of automatic data processing resources. The procurement and use of automatic data processing equipment and the necessary planning work within the federal administration continued to require the approval of the Federal Office.

=== Federal Office for Information Technology (BfI) ===
As part of the EFFI-QM-BV efficiency improvement project, new management structures based on the principles of New Public Management (NPM) were created in the federal administration in 1990. This also involved the principle of separating advisory and supervisory functions, which led to the dissolution of the BFO and the creation of a new Federal Office for Information Technology (BfI). This new cross-departmental office was responsible for handling interdepartmental conceptual and technical IT issues and had operational responsibility for interdepartmental IT applications. It was also tasked with supporting and advising federal administrative units in the field of IT and, in collaboration with the Federal IT Conference (IKB), issuing technical guidelines on the use of IT standards and norms. The Federal Office also developed its own IT applications, made its IT infrastructure available to administrative units, and performed IT tasks on behalf of other offices. Meanwhile, the Federal Office for Information Technology focused on technology. Of the 172 employees at the outset, around 75 percent worked in the Rechenzentrum der allgemeinen Bundesverwaltung (RZ BV) ((in English) General Federal Administration Computer Center). The remaining employees were involved in user training, services, and planning. By 1999, the number of employees had grown to 230. The director of the BfI, Henri Garin, headed the office until it was transferred to the Federal Office of Information Technology and Telecommunications in 1999. One of his first projects was the construction of a new central administrative building in Bern at a cost of CHF 130 million. Until then, the BfI had been housed at four locations within the city of Bern, which had various disadvantages: workrooms and certain equipment had to be duplicated, management and communication were difficult, and the peripheral location of the IT operations caused time losses in delivering and retrieving data carriers and extensive printing work (at that time, the computer center printed more than 10 million pages of paper annually). In addition, around 5,000 data carriers were exchanged annually with other IT systems at the federal, cantonal, and private businesses level. As part of the government and administrative reforms in the second half of the 1990s, the areas of IT and communications were also examined in depth. This revealed that, due to the rapid development of technology and the virtually nationwide introduction of IT from small beginnings within a short period of time, as well as the tense situation on the labor market for IT specialists, even during times of recession, development had been uncoordinated. However, management and control were identified as the most significant weaknesses in the federal administration's IT sector. In 2000, the Federal Council therefore decided to reorganize federal IT by means of the Ordinance on Information Technology and Telecommunications in the Federal Administration (BinfV) and the Federal IT and Telecommunications Directive (BInfW). Essentially, three different roles were defined: The Federal Council for Information Technology ((in German) Informatikrat des Bundes, IRB), composed of representatives from the departments and the Federal Chancellery, was to act as a staff, planning, and coordination body with overall strategic responsibility for IT in the Federal Administration. All departments, the Federal Chancellery and the administrative units that used IT services were designated as service users ((in German) Leistungsbezüger, LB). IT services were provided by service providers ((in German) Leistungserbringer, LE), which supplied IT infrastructure, developed solutions and provided support. There could be no more than one LE per department, which effectively meant centralization of IT services at the departmental level. However, the ordinance also allowed departments to pursue further centralization by merging departmental service providers into interdepartmental units. In addition to this organization, it was stipulated that certain cross-departmental services to be determined by the Federal Council for Information technology (IRB) should be provided centrally for all departments by the new Federal Office of Information Technology and Telecommunications (FOITT), which was formed from the former Federal Office of Information Technology. These included, in particular, civil data and voice communications – i.e., telecommunications, internet, and intranet – cross-departmental applications, so-called holistic IT services such as consulting, design, operation, and support, organization of courses, ensuring interoperability, and disaster preparedness. However, the BIT could also serve as an IT service provider for departments, which was initially the case for the home department, the FDF, and the Federal Chancellery, and was later extended to other departments. In addition to organizational realignment and restructuring, the data centers were merged, an SAP competence center and an application development department were created, and the automation of data acquisition and the development of nationwide telecommunications services with connections to the cantons and embassies abroad were pushed forward.

== Directors ==
=== Marius Redli (1999–2011) ===
The Federal Office of Information Technology, Systems and Telecommunication FOITT was founded on July 1, 1999. The first director was Marius Redli (born April 3, 1950; died September 6, 2021), an ETH engineer who was deputy director of the main department for operations and data communications in the predecessor organization from 1992 to 1994 and deputy director from 1994 to 1999. The NOVE-IT project (2000–2004) restructured the entire IT system of the Federal Administration. This involved separating service users from service providers and assigning cross-cutting tasks such as telecommunications, IT training, competence centers for the Internet and SAP, operational security, etc. to the FOITT. These were tasks that had to be performed for the entire federal administration. As a result, IT and telecommunications services (ICT) for the FAA and the Federal Chancellery were consolidated, the five existing data centers of the FOITT, the Federal Finance Administration (FAA), the Federal Tax Administration, the Federal Customs, and the Central Compensation Office were merged, the infrastructures were harmonized, and the employees were integrated into the FOITT. At the beginning of the 2000s, there was a shortage of IT specialists in the federal administration. In 2003, the FOITT took over service provision for the Federal Department of Environment, Transport, Energy and Communications and in 2007 for the Federal Department of Home Affairs, as well as office automation for the Federal Department of Justice and Police. Later, Publica, the Federal Criminal Court in Bellinzona, the Federal Administrative Court in St. Gallen, Swissmedic, and the Federal Office of Sport became FOITT customers. These steps involved integrating the new employees into FOITT, adapting the organization, management processes and culture, harmonizing the infrastructure and exploiting the resulting economies of scale to increase efficiency. Since its foundation, BIT has grown from 230 to 1,200 employees. Since 2003, the FOITT has been competing with third parties and, since 2007, has been run as a FLAG agency with a performance mandate from the Federal Council and a global budget (over CHF 440 million in 2010). In 2010, it was announced that Marius Redli would be stepping down after 12 years in office, during which he had built the FOITT into one of the five largest IT service providers in Switzerland.

=== Giovanni Conti (2011–2019) ===
In 2011, the Federal Council appointed Giovanni Conti to succeed Marius Redli. After just six months, Conti launched a reorganization project for its 1,100 internal and 400 external employees. The aim was to refocus the company on customer orientation and improve consistency between the four historically grown divisions. In November 2011, Conti halted the “Gever Office” project developed in collaboration with Microsoft, which had cost several million Swiss francs to date. Due to differing views on the further development of the FOITT, the employment relationship with Conti was terminated in mid-June 2019.

=== Dirk Lindemann (from 2019) ===
In June 2019, the Federal Council decided to appoint Dirk Lindemann as interim head of the FOITT. Lindemann had been a member of the Executive Board since January 2013 and, since July 2015, Deputy Director and Head of the Resources Division of the Federal Tax Administration. In his previous role as external project manager for the ultimately unsuccessful IT project Insieme (IT project), Lindemann and Conti were at odds due to conflicts between the FTA and the FOITT. In November 2019, Lindemann was definitively elected as the new director of the FOITT. As part of the “midar” program (Romansh for “change,” “move”), initial steps were taken toward the agile transformation of the FOITT, including reducing the management team from eight to five main departments. The development of the EU-compatible Swiss digital COVID certificate within just a few weeks earned the FOITT widespread recognition, as it enabled people to travel abroad during the vacation period. Other key projects of the FOITT include GEVER, DaziT, SUPERB, Container Application Environment (CAE) with Red Hat OpenShift, e-ID, Swiss Government Cloud (SGC) programs, and the introduction of Microsoft 365 in the federal administration. Following the completion of its transformation into an agile organization, the FOITT is now focusing on the systematic digitization of its processes, from the customer interface and service provision to fully automated billing. The RUVER project (Romansh for “oak tree”) saw 340 employees and 500 specialist applications from the former Command Support Organization (FUB) integrated into the FOITT in 2023. In 2024, the FOITT celebrated 50 years of membership in the swissICT association and 25 years of existence. In 2025, the FOITT launched a pilot project under the working title FOITT AI Assistant, which is based on an Open Source Large Language Model and is operated on its own infrastructure in a specially secured environment in its own data centers. It will be made available to the federal administrative units as a service from 2026.

== Organization ==
The FOITT is divided into five main departments: Business Solutions (BS), Platform Services (PS), Defense Platform (DP), Domestic Services (DO), and Strategy & Resources (SR). The organizational provisions are laid down in the FOITT Rules of Procedure (GO) and updated as necessary.

== Legal basis ==
- The publication platform for federal law Fedlex (15 April 2025). "Verordnung über die digitalen Dienste und die digitale Transformation in der Bundesverwaltung (Digitalisierungsverordnung, DigiV)" [Ordinance on Digital Services and Digital Transformation in the Federal Administration (Digitalization Ordinance, DigiV)] (in German).
- The publication platform for federal law Fedlex (17 February 2010). "Art. 16-18 der Organisationsverordnung für das Eidgenössische Finanzdepartement" [Articles 16-18 of the Organizational Ordinance for the Federal Department of Finance] (in German).

== Certification ==
The FOITT was certified by the Swiss Association for Quality and Management Systems (SQS) in accordance with the ISO/IEC 27001:2013 standard at the beginning of March 2021 and has been recertified several times since then.

== Audits ==
The Swiss Federal Audit Office audited the BIT in various areas:

- SFAO, Swiss Federal Audit Office (26 March 2015). "Reorganisationsprojekt "ON BIT"" [“ON BIT” Reorganization Project] (in German).
- SFAO, Swiss Federal Audit Office (16 December 2016). "Beschaffungswesen" [Public procurement] (in German).
- SFAO, Swiss Federal Audit Office (10 May 2023). "DTI-Schlüsselprojekt Migration RZ CAMPUS BIT 2020" [DTI key project 2020 FOITT CAMPUS data centre migration] (in German).
- SFAO, Swiss Federal Audit Office (8 April 2024). "Impact de l'intégration de l'exploitation de la BAC dans l'OFIT en termes de fiabilité" [Impact of the integration of AFCSO operations into the FOITT in terms of reliability] (in French).
- SFAO, Swiss Federal Audit Office (20 October 2025). "Internationaler Parallelaudit zur Künstlichen Intelligenz" [International parallel audit on artificial intelligence] (in German).
- SFAO, Swiss Federal Audit Office (3 December 2025). "Projet clé Swiss Government Cloud avec accent sur le business case" [Swiss Government Cloud key project, with an emphasis on the business case] (in French).
- SFAO, Swiss Federal Audit Office (26 January 2026). "Schlüsselprojekt SUPERB: Einführung der Beschaffungs- und Vergabemanagementlösung" [Key project SUPERB: introduction of the procurement and award management solution] (in German).
- SFAO, Swiss Federal Audit Office (18 February 2026). "Schlüsselprojekt E-ID" [Key project e-ID] (in German).
- SFAO, Swiss Federal Audit Office (20 April 2026). "IKT-Kostenverrechnungsmodell" [ICT cost accounting model] (in German).
- SFAO, Swiss Federal Audit Office (29 June 2026). "DTI-Schlüsselprojekt iTASK" [iTASK key ICT project Defence Group] (in German).

== Full-time positions since 2001 ==
Raw data

"Federal Finance Administration FFA: State financial statements".
"Federal Finance Administration FFA: Data portal".

== Locations ==
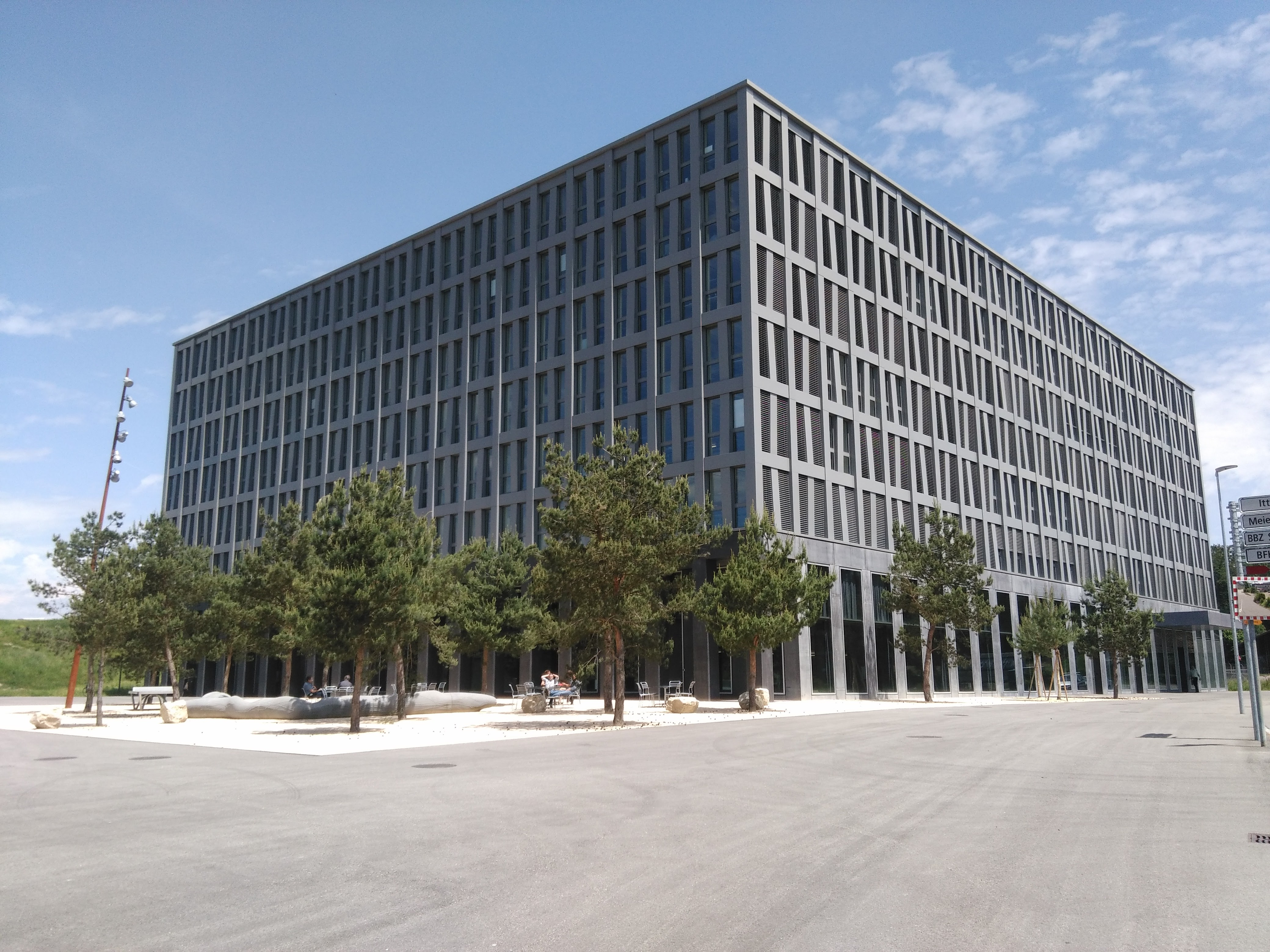
Building of the FOITT in Zollikofen (2015)

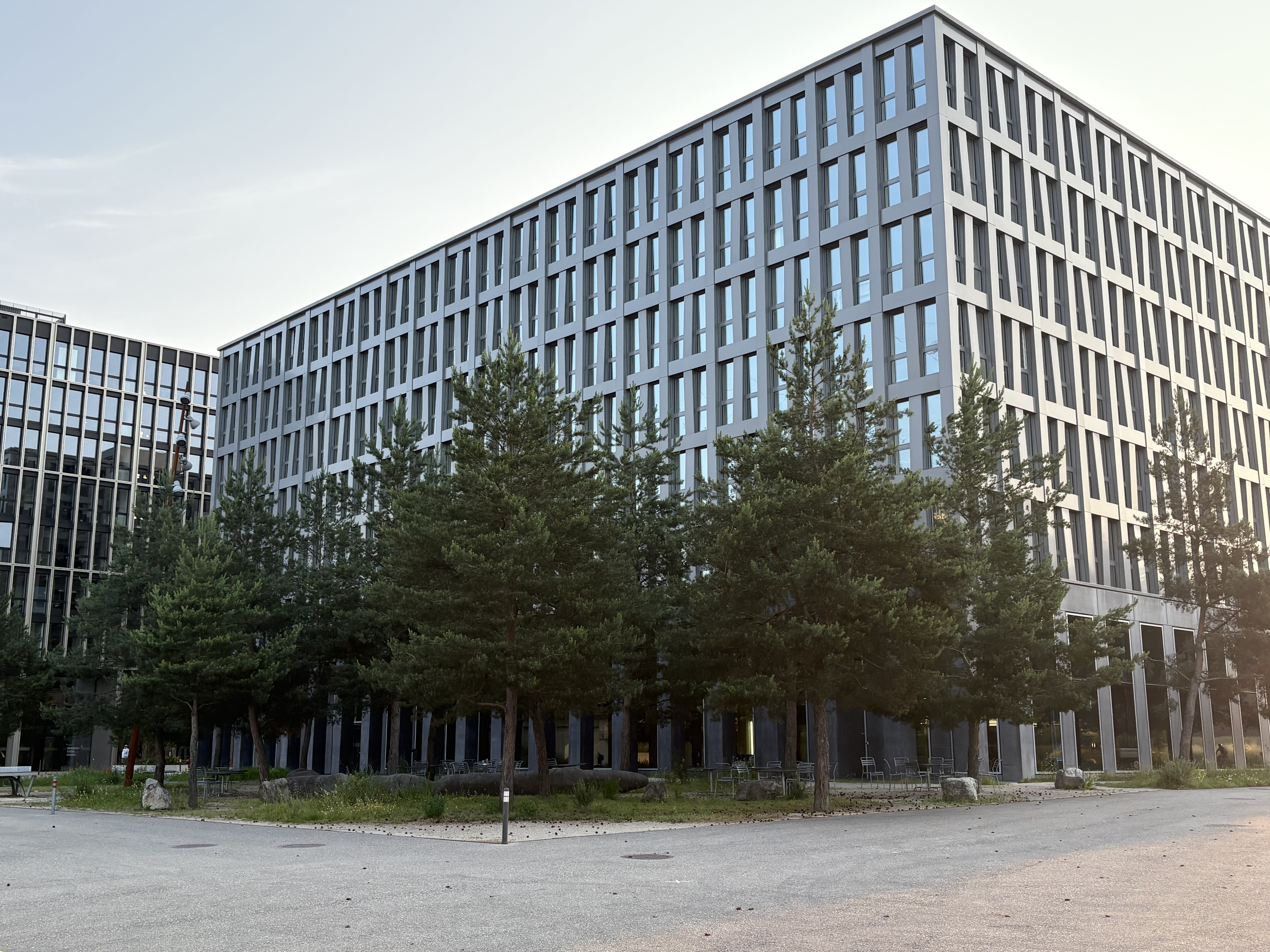
Eichenweg 1–3 in Zollikofen (2025)

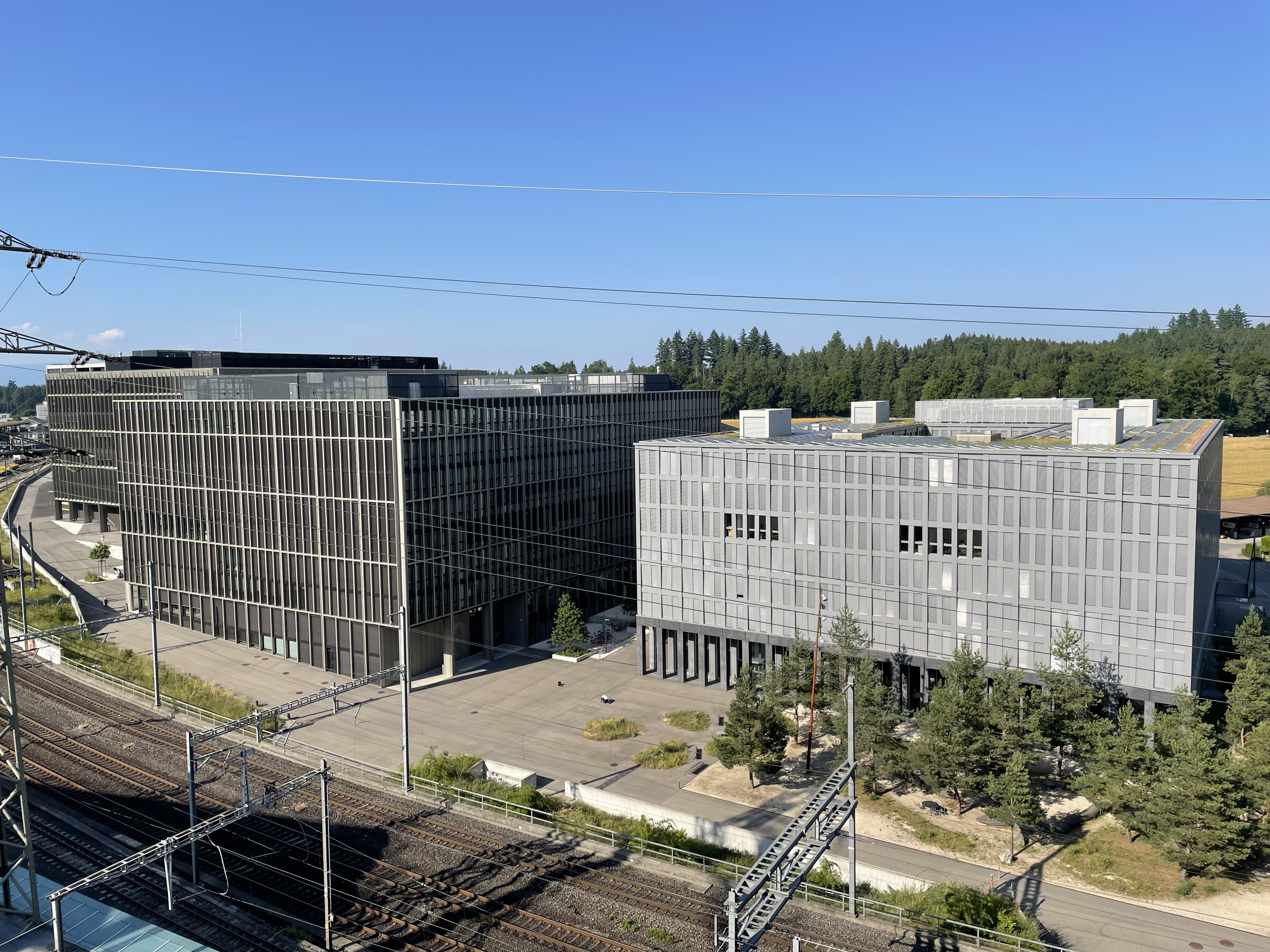
FOITT Headquarters next to the RBS train station Oberzollikofen of the S8

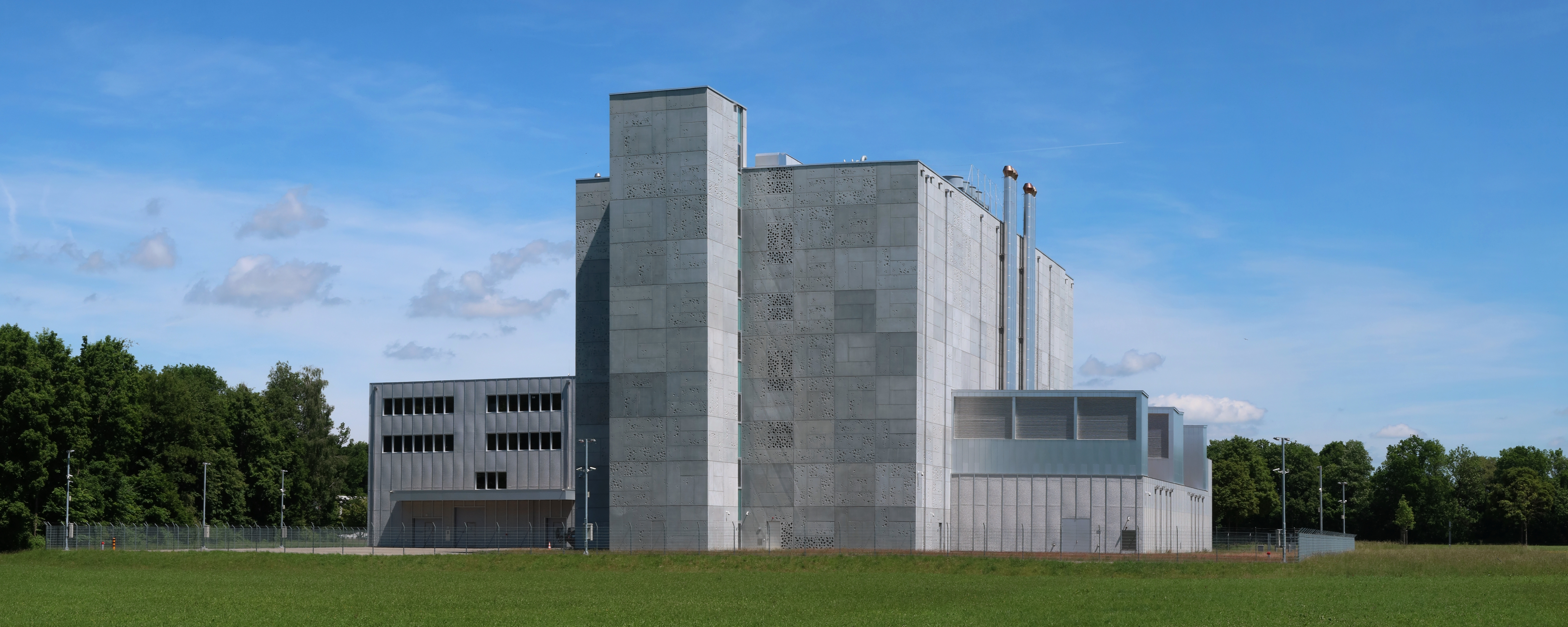
CAMPUS - Military Data Center operated by FOITT, in Frauenfeld (2022)

One of six sculptures with enlarged rose hips at the top created by the Swiss artist Markus Müller

FOITT at night

The FOITT was headquartered in the city of Bern in the administrative building known as “Titanic II” in the Monbijou district. Since 2021, the BIT has been headquartered on the Meielen campus in Zollikofen at Eichenweg 1 and Eichenweg 3. The FOITT previously had seven branch offices, including a data center. In addition to four other locations in the city of Bern, there was one branch office each in Köniz and Geneva. The new buildings in Zollikofen have reduced the number of locations to two. Since March 2, 2020, the BIT has been operating the civilian section of the Frauenfeld Data Center (Federal Data Center), which is run jointly with the Department of Defense, Civil Protection, and Sport. The building was constructed by Armasuisse. Among other things, the FOITT operates servers for the Federal Department of Justice and Police in the new data center.
