= Gottlieb Schläppi =

Swiss financial administrator

Personal details
- Born: August 14, 1928 La Lenk, Switzerland
- Died: May 4, 2023 (aged 94)
- Spouse: Irene Mollet (m. 1954)
- Education: University of Berne (Dr. iur., 1964)
- Occupation: Lawyer, financial administrator

Gottlieb Schläppi (14 August 1928 – 4 May 2023) was a Swiss lawyer and financial administrator who served as Director of the Swiss Federal Audit Office from 1981 to 1993.

== Early life and education ==
Schläppi was born on 14 August 1928 in Lenk im Simmental to Gottlieb Schläppi, a secondary school teacher, and Fanny Allemann. He was a citizen of Lenk and Berne.

He studied law at the University of Berne, obtaining his lawyer's license in 1954 and his doctorate in 1964. In 1954, he married Irene Mollet, daughter of Emil Mollet, an artisan.

== Career ==
Schläppi began his career as an employee of the Federal Finance Administration in 1954, where he worked until 1973. He was promoted to vice-director in 1972, a position in which he headed the task force and special services group and the real estate service, among other responsibilities.

From 1973 to 1980, he worked in the Finance Division of the Postal, Telephone and Telegraph Services (PTT), serving as director from 1974.

=== Director of the Swiss Federal Audit Office ===
In 1981, Schläppi was appointed Director of the Swiss Federal Audit Office, a position he held until his retirement in 1993. During his tenure, he developed new examination procedures for commitment credits, development aid, industrial prices, and major acquisitions abroad. He also simplified the regulations relating to subsidies within the federal administration.

=== Military service ===
Schläppi attained the rank of colonel in the Swiss military, serving as deputy to the chief commissary of war.

== Bibliography ==
- Neue Zürcher Zeitung, 7 February 1981
- Finanz und Wirtschaft, 13 August 1988
- Der Bund, 16 March 1993
