= Federal budget =

Federal budgets are the national budgets of federations, including:

- Australian federal budget
- Canadian federal budget
- Federal budget of Germany
- Union budget of India
- Malaysian federal budget
- Federal budget of Russia
- Scottish budget
- South African Budget
- Federal budget of Switzerland
- United States federal budget
