= Federal Department of Finance =

Swiss government department

Coordinates: 46.9462°N 7.4416°E

- (in German) Eidgenössisches Finanzdepartement (in French) Département fédéral des finances (in Italian) Dipartimento federale delle finanze (in Romansh) Departament federal da finanzas

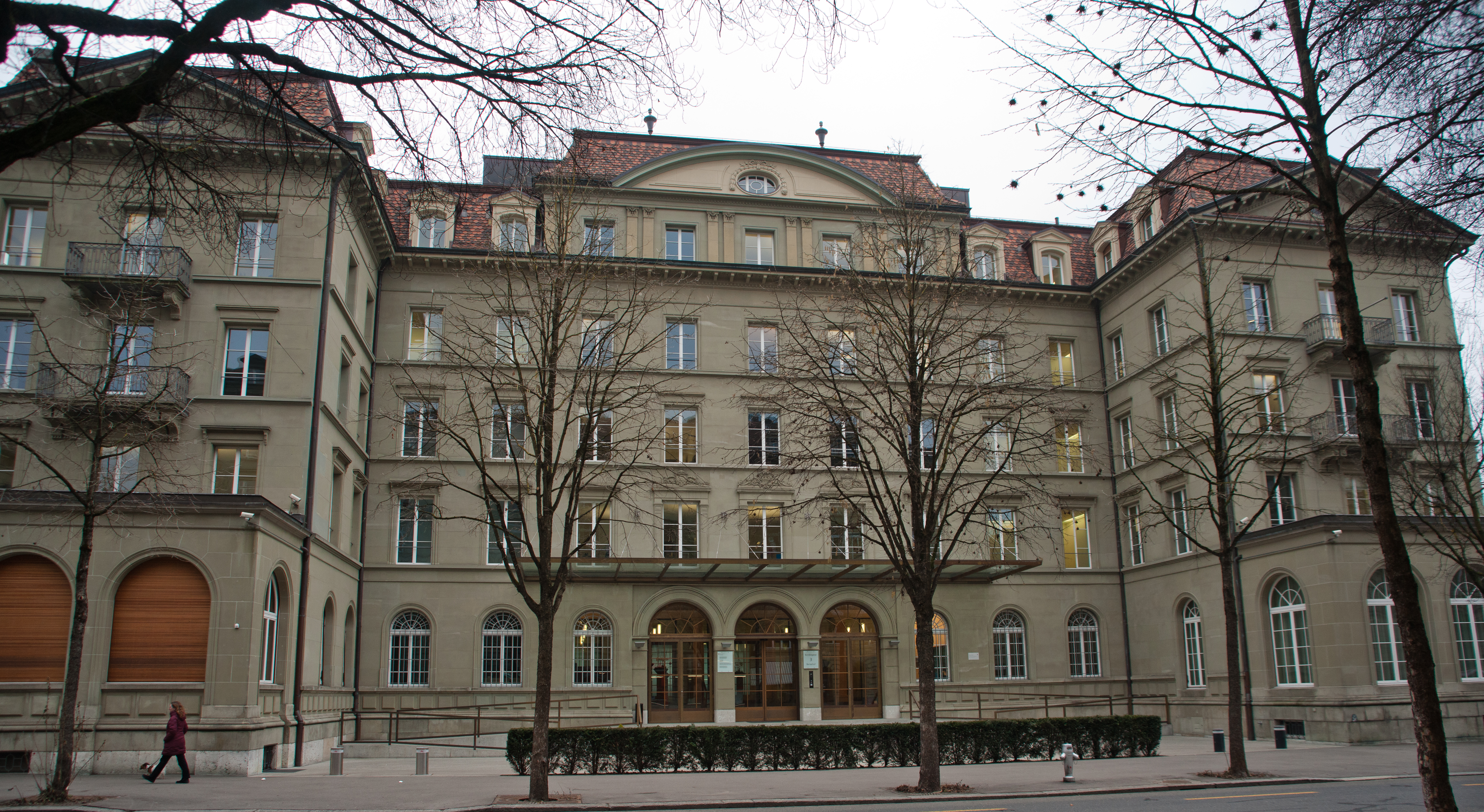
- The Bernerhof, headquarters of the Federal Department of Finance

Agency overview
- Formed: 1848; 178 years ago
- Jurisdiction: Federal administration of Switzerland
- Headquarters: Bern
- Employees: 8,048
- Annual budget: Expenditure: CHF 15.7 billion Revenue: CHF 59.5 billion (2009)
- Minister responsible: Karin Keller-Sutter, Federal Councillor
- Child agencies: State Secretariat for International Financial Matters; Federal Finance Administration; Federal Office of Personnel; Federal Tax Administration; Federal Office for Customs and Border Security; Federal Office of Information Technology, Systems and Telecommunication; Federal Office for Buildings and Logistics; Swiss Federal Audit Office; FINMA; Swiss Federal Pension Fund
- Website: www.efd.admin.ch

The Federal Department of Finance (FDF, German: Eidgenössisches Finanzdepartement, French: Département fédéral des finances, Italian: Dipartimento federale delle finanze, Romansh: Departament federal da finanzas) is one of the seven departments of the Swiss federal government. The department is headquartered in Bern and headed by a member of the Swiss Federal Council, Switzerland's finance minister. Initially, in 1848, the department was called "Department of Finance", then, from 1873 "Department of Finance and Customs", until it received its present designation in 1978.

== Organisation ==
The Department is composed of the following offices:

- General Secretariat
- State Secretariat for International Financial Matters (SIF)
- Federal Finance Administration (FFA): Responsible for the budget, financial planning, financial policy, the federal treasury and financial equalisation between the Confederation and the cantons. It also supervises the federal mint and the Central Compensation Office (CCO) in Geneva (responsible for implementing the Swiss social security).
- Federal Office of Personnel (FOPER): Responsible for human resources management, personnel policy and personnel training.
- Federal Tax Administration (FTA): Responsible for federal revenue collection and the application of federal tax laws in the cantons.
- Federal Office for Customs and Border Security (FOCBS): Responsible for monitoring the import, export and transit of goods, collecting customs duties, traffic charges and taxes.
  - Swiss Border Guard, which carries out border police duties.
- Federal Office of Information Technology, Systems and Telecommunication (FOITT): Provides IT services for the federal administration.
- Federal Office for Buildings and Logistics (FOBL): Responsible for property management, central procurement of non-durable goods, federal publications and the production of the Swiss passport.

The following independent authorities are affiliated to the FDF for administrative purposes:

- Swiss Federal Audit Office (SFAO): The federal government audit office. Examines accounting practices and verifies the proper and efficient use of resources by the administration, other public service institutions and subsidy recipients.
- Swiss Financial Market Supervisory Authority (FINMA): Regulates banks, insurances, securities dealers, investment funds and stock exchanges, as well as the disclosure of shareholding interests, public takeover bids and mortgage lenders.
- Federal Pension Fund (PUBLICA): Provides insurance coverage to employees of the federal administration, the other branches of the federal government and associated organisations.
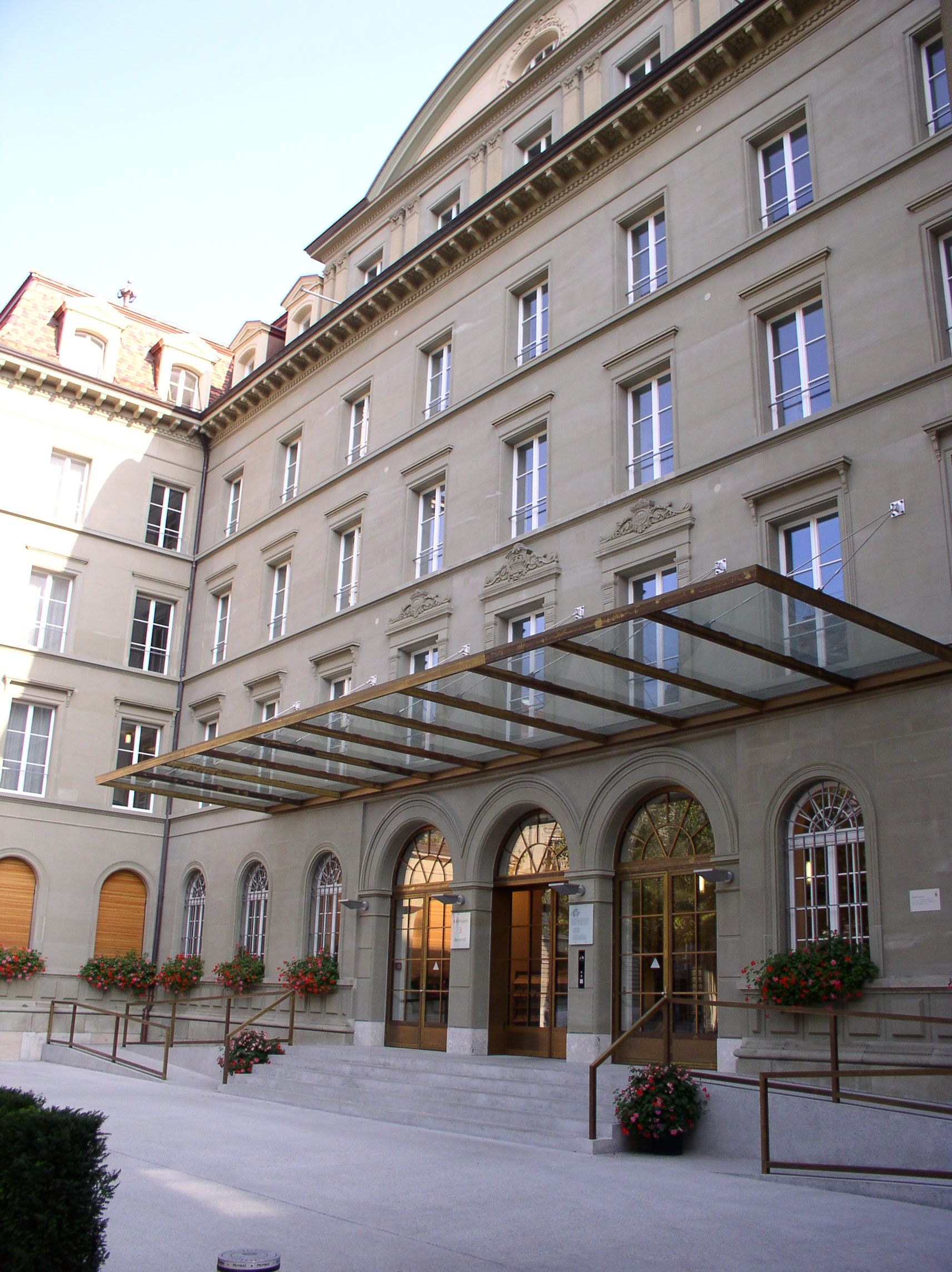
The main entrance

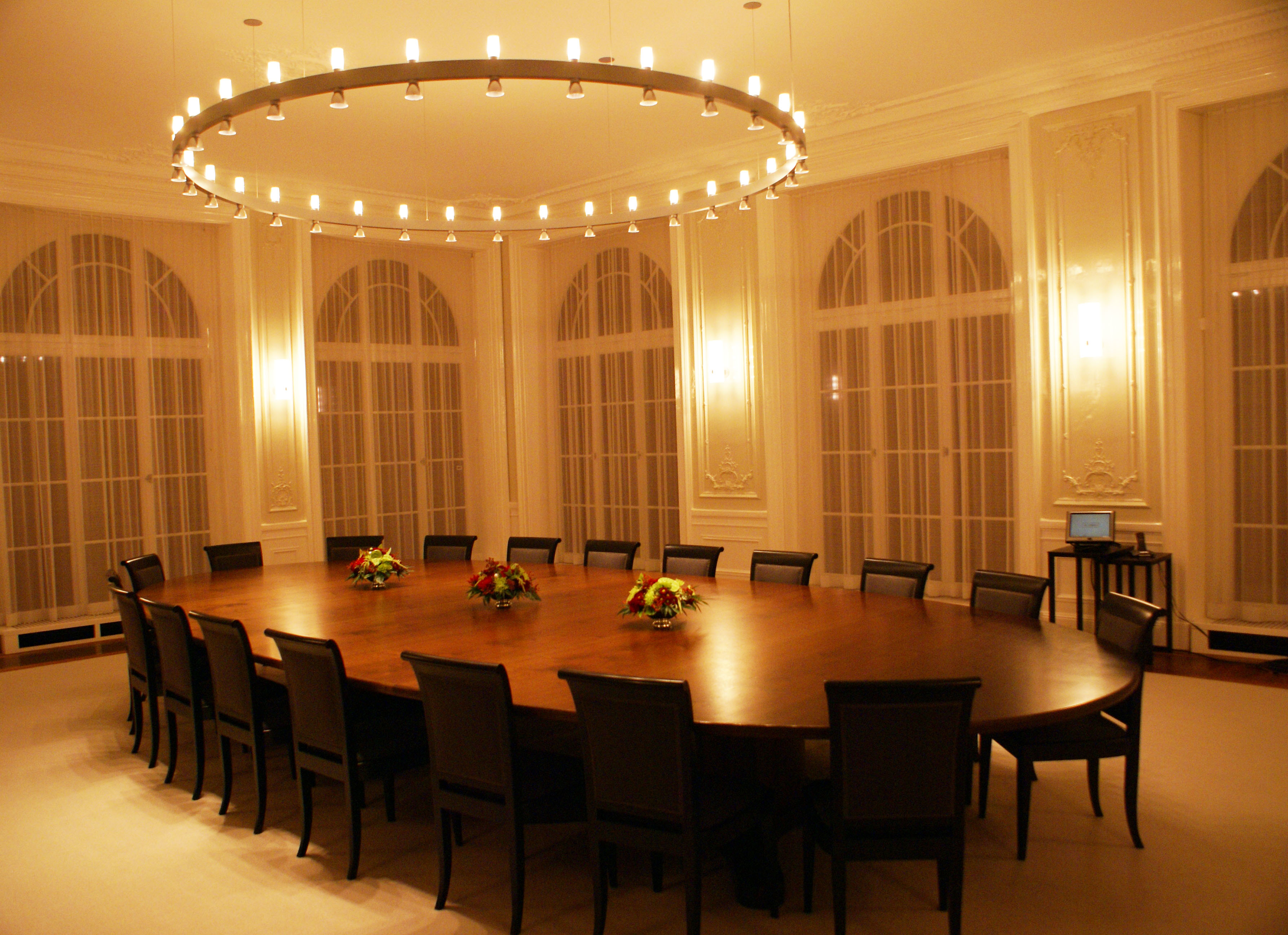
A meeting room.

== List of heads of the department ==
- 1848–1850: Josef Munzinger
- 1851 only: Henri Druey
- 1852 only: Josef Munzinger
- 1853–1855: Henri Druey
- 1855–1856: Josef Martin Knüsel
- 1857–1858: Jakob Stämpfli
- 1859–1861: Constant Fornerod
- 1862–1863: Josef Martin Knüsel
- 1864–1867: Jean-Jacques Challet-Venel
- 1868 only: Victor Ruffy
- 1869 only: Jean-Jacques Challet-Venel
- 1870–1871: Paul Cérésole
- 1872 only: Karl Schenk
- 1872–1873: Johann Jakob Scherer
- 1873–1875: Wilhelm Matthias Naeff
- 1876–1878: Bernhard Hammer
- 1879 only: Simeon Bavier
- 1880–1890: Bernhard Hammer
- 1891–1899: Walter Hauser
- 1900 only: Robert Comtesse
- 1901–1902: Walter Hauser
- 1903 only: Robert Comtesse
- 1904 only: Marc-Émile Ruchet
- 1905–1909: Robert Comtesse
- 1910 only: Josef Anton Schobinger
- 1911 only: Robert Comtesse
- 1912–1919: Giuseppe Motta
- 1920–1934: Jean-Marie Musy
- 1934–1938: Albert Meyer
- 1939–1943: Ernst Wetter
- 1944–1951: Ernst Nobs
- 1952–1954: Max Weber
- 1954–1959: Hans Streuli
- 1960–1962: Jean Bourgknecht
- 1962–1968: Roger Bonvin
- 1968–1973: Nello Celio
- 1974–1979: Georges-André Chevallaz
- 1980–1983: Willy Ritschard
- 1984–1995: Otto Stich
- 1996–2003: Kaspar Villiger
- 2004–2010: Hans-Rudolf Merz
- 2010–2016: Eveline Widmer-Schlumpf
- 2016–2022: Ueli Maurer
- 2023–present: Karin Keller-Sutter

== See also ==
- Federal budget of Switzerland
- Federal administration of Switzerland

== Full-time positions since 2001 ==
Raw data

"Federal Finance Administration FFA: State financial statements".
"Federal Finance Administration FFA: Data portal".
