= Mehrwert =

Mehrwert is a German word that literally means "more worth". It is usually idiomatically translated as "surplus value". It may refer to:

- Surplus value, an economic concept particularly associated with Karl Marx's work
  - Theories of Surplus Value (German: Theorien über den Mehrwert), a written work by Karl Marx
  - Superprofit (German: extra-Mehrwert), an economic concept
- Value-added tax in some German-speaking countries (German: Mehrwertsteuer)
- Mehrwert Records, a record label in Cologne
- MehrWERT Award, an arts award sponsored by Erste Group

See also:

- Surplus product (German: Mehrprodukt)
