= Thorsten Domke =

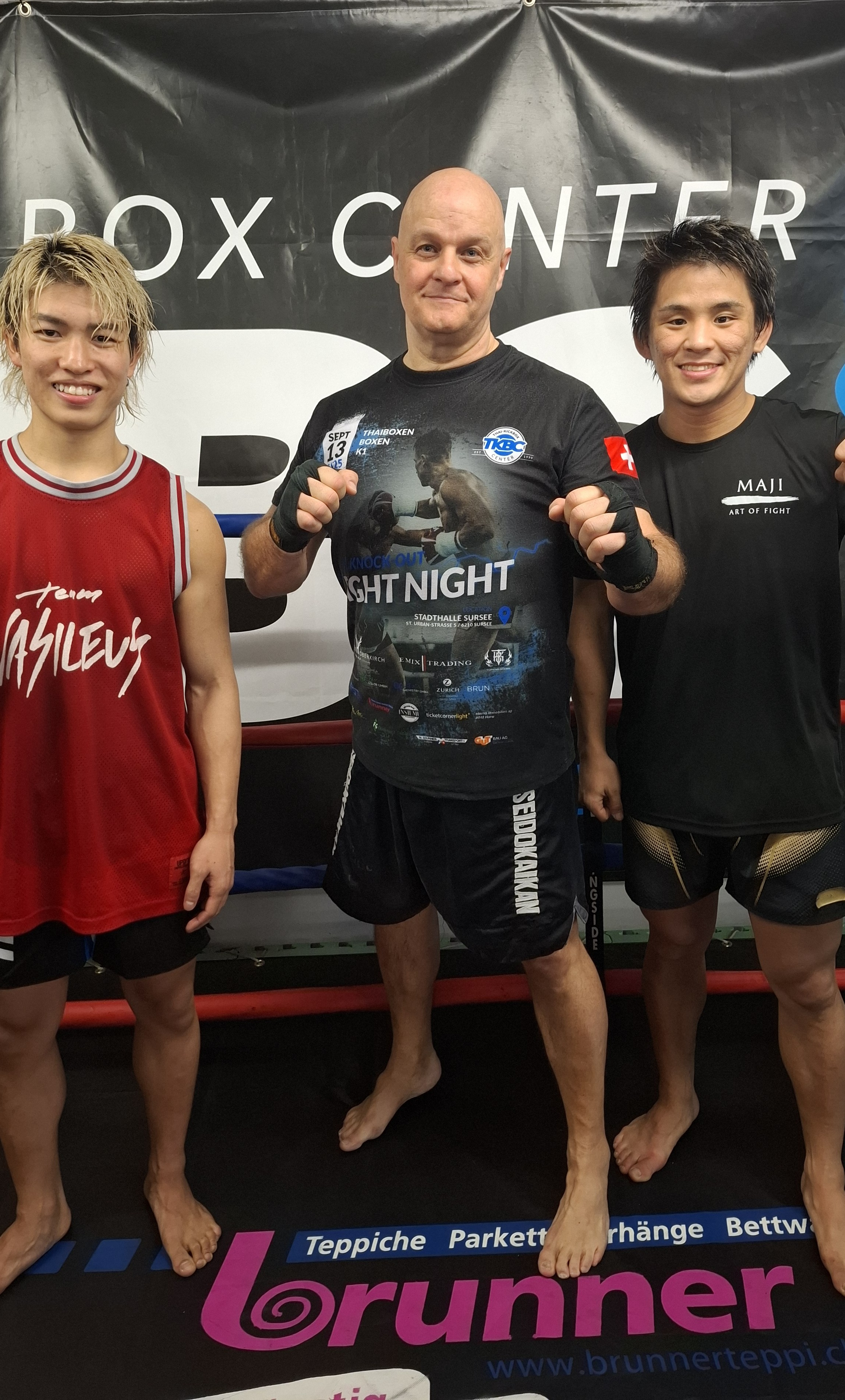
- Takumi Terada, Thorsten Domke, and Yuki Yoza in 2026

Personal information
- Born: Lucerne, Switzerland
- Occupation: Key Account Manager
- Employer: Federal Office of Information Technology, Systems and Telecommunication
- Height: 1.82 m (5 ft 11 1/2 in)
- Weight: 93 kg (205 lb; 14.6 st)

Sport
- Country: Switzerland
- Sport: Kyokushin Karate, Seidokaikan Karate
- Weight class: Heavyweight
- Coached by: Andy Hug, Michael Thompson, Pablo Amodeo
Achievements and titles
Event	1st	2nd	3rd
World Championships	1	–	–
European Championships	–	1	–
Swiss Championships	3	–	–
Other major tournaments	2	1	–
Total	6	2	0
World Championships
Gold medal – first place	2000 World Championships	Tokyo
European Championships
Silver medal – second place	1998 European Championships	Budapest
Swiss Championships
Gold medal – first place	1996 Swiss Championships	Wohlen
Gold medal – first place	1997 Swiss Championships	Wohlen
Gold medal – first place	1998 Swiss Championships	Trimbach
Other Major Tournaments
Gold medal – first place	1994 Pilatus Cup	Alpnach
Silver medal – second place	1998 Copa Valencia	Valencia
Gold medal – first place	2000 Spanish Open	Barcelona

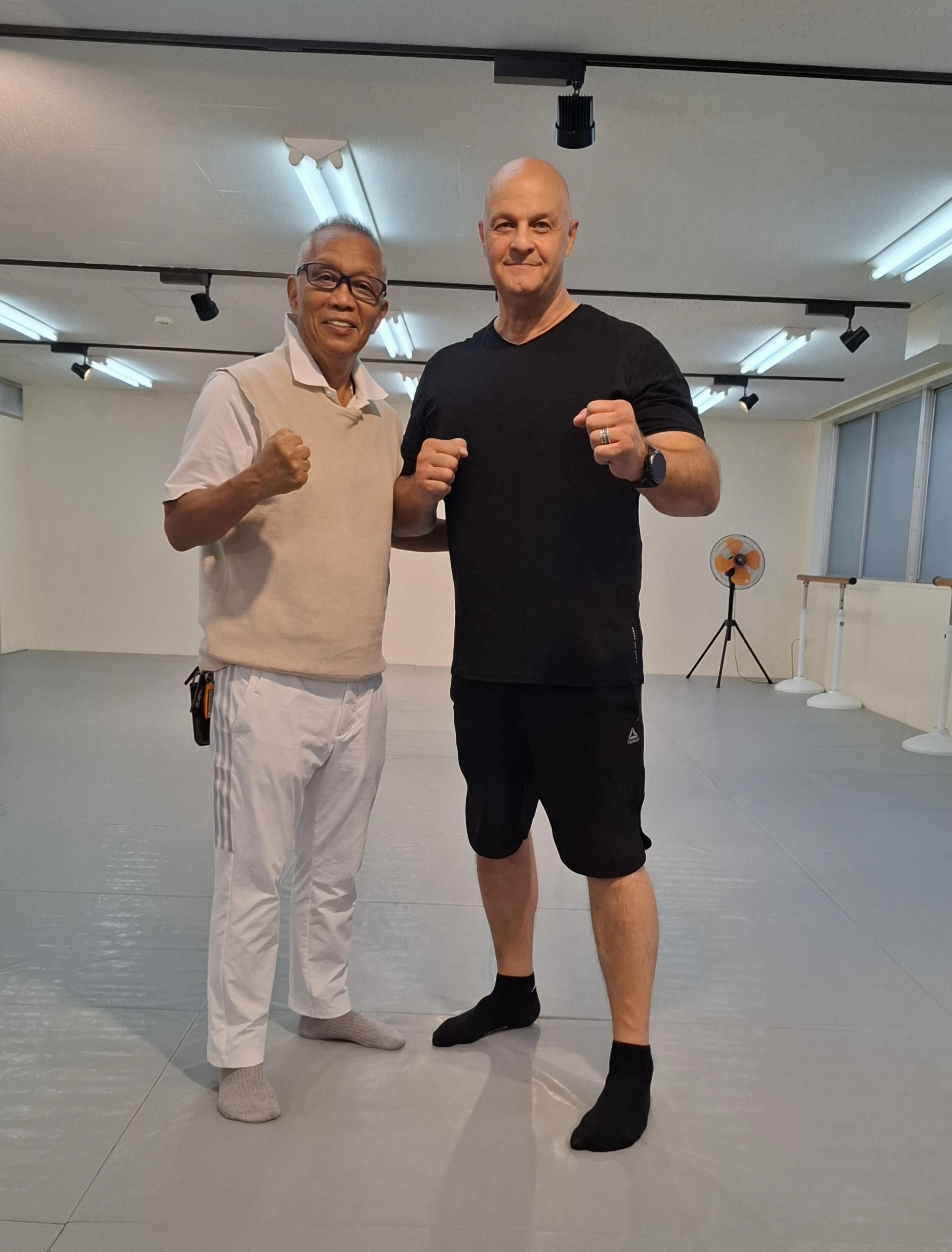
Kancho Ishii (founder of Seidokaikan and K-1) and Thorsten Domke in Osaka (2026)

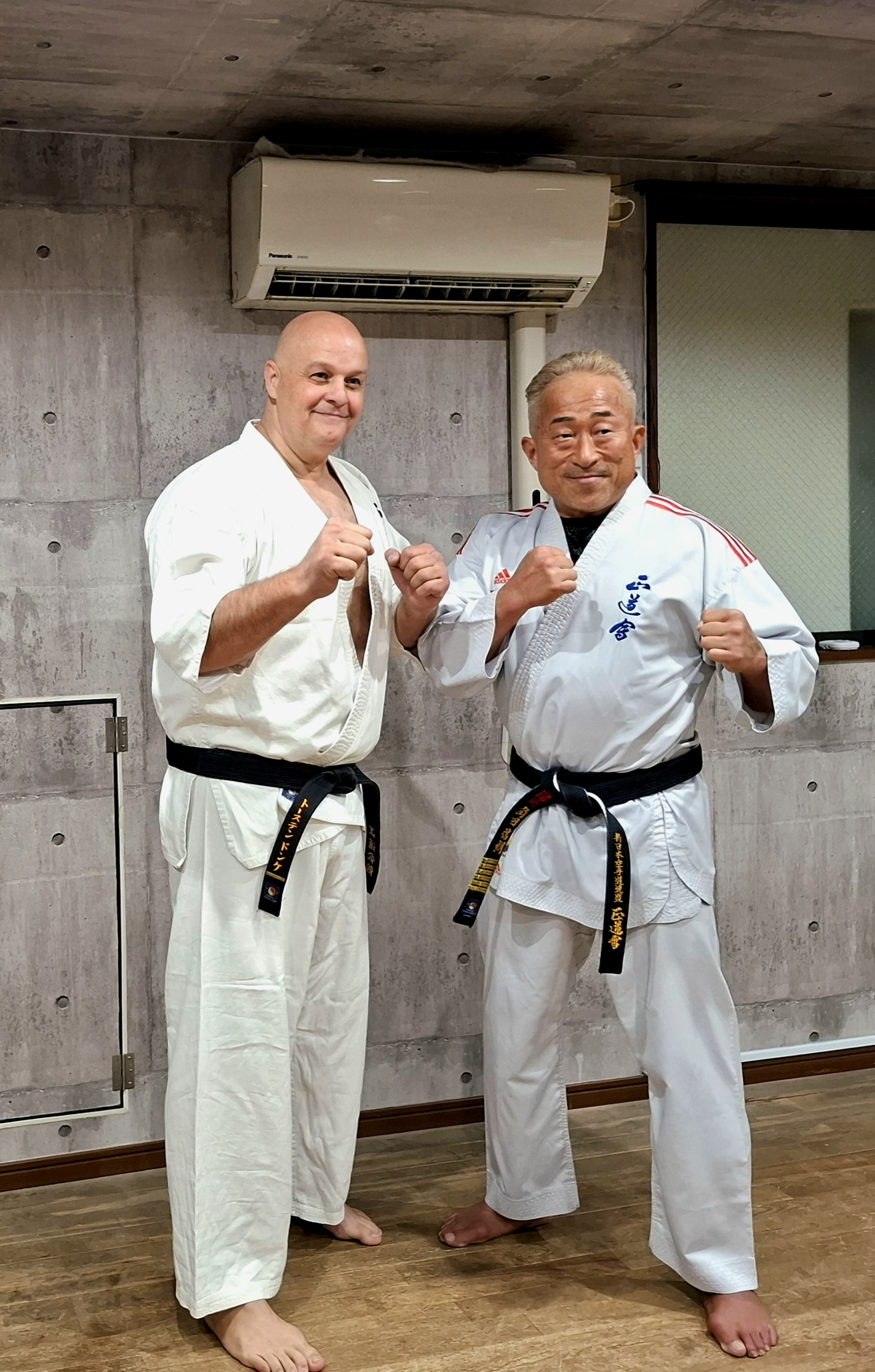
Thorsten Domke and Nobuaki Kakuda in 2025

Thorsten Domke (born 17. Dezember 1970 in Lucerne is a Swiss martial artist, three-time Swiss champion, European runner-up, and winner of the 2000 World Championship in Tokyo in Kyokushin, as well as an instructor and seminar leader. For several years, he trained alongside Andy Hug and Michael Thompson. As Andy Hug increasingly focused on Thai kickboxing and international K-1 competitions in the late 1990s, Domke decided in 1998 to return to the traditional style of Kyokushinkai karate. Early in his career, Domke completed an apprenticeship as a metal fabricator and later worked as a key account manager at various Swiss companies and organizations.

== Career ==
Thorsten Domke grew up in Stansstad with his brothers and parents. During his school and apprenticeship years, he practised various endurance sports, particularly triathlon, which laid the foundation for his later career in full-contact martial arts. At the age of 22, he began training in Kyokushinkai karate. In 1994, he transferred to the Seido Hombu Dojo in Lucerne, where he discovered the Seidokaikan style. With his instructors Andy Hug and Michael Thompson he developed special techniques including the Ushiro-Geri (back kick), Mawashi geri (low kick), and Ushiro-Mawashi-Geri (spinning back roundhouse kick). He played an active role in establishing the Hombu Swiss Seido in Horw. As Andy Hug increasingly focused on Thai kickboxing and international K-1 competitions in the late 1990s, Domke decided in 1998 to return to the traditional style of Kyokushinkai karate. Domke works as a seminar leader and technical expert of modern full-contact martial arts styles.

== Mastery Levels ==
Mastery Levels: Thorsten Domke holds a 6th dan in Kyokusinkaikan Karate, a 1st dan in Seidokaikan Karate, and has completed advanced training in Krav Maga (Amnon Maor).

== Competitions ==
=== 1994 ===
- 1st place in the Pilatus Cup Kyokushinkai tournament in Alpnach after four matches

=== 1995 ===
- 5th place in the “Best of Sixteen” tournament at Seidokaikan in Berlin (lost to Semmy Schilt)
- 16th place in the World Championship finals at the Seidokaikan in Osaka, after securing one of three spots organized by Andy Hug There, he trained alongside the world's best fighters, including Andy Hug, Nobuaki Kakuda, Michael Thompson, Felix Ntumazah, Taiei Kin, Toshiyuki Atokawa, and Akio Mori.

=== 1996 ===
- 1st place at the Swiss Seidokaikan Championship (middleweight)
- 5th place in Kyokushinkai in Valencia

=== 1997 ===
- 1st place at the Swiss Seidokaikan Championship
- Participation in the 1st Chur Fight Night at the Seidokaikan (middleweight)

=== 1998 ===
- 2nd place at the Copa Valencia Kyokushinkai tournament in Valencia
- 1st place at the Swiss Kyokushinkai Championship
- Participation in the Kyokushinkai British Open in London

=== 1999 ===
- European Kyokushinkai Vice Champion (Middleweight) in Budapest

=== 2000 ===
- 1st place at the Spanish Kyokushinkai Open in Barcelona, having knocked out all opponents
- World Champion in Kyokushinkai in Tokyo, the first European to achieve this feat

=== 2008 ===
- Winner of the Kyokushinkai Fight in Barcelona

== Quotations ==
Die Karate-Philosophie muss man in sich tragen – und leben!

You have to carry the philosophy of karate within you—and live by it!

— Thorsten Domke

Thorsten Domke, alumno y sparring de Andy Hug, es un competidor muy técnico, inteligente y fuerte. Rápido como un boxeador y fuerte como un karateka.

Thorsten Domke, a student and sparring partner of Andy Hug, is a technically gifted, intelligent, and powerful competitor. He is as fast as a boxer and as powerful as a karateka.

— Shihan Pedro Hidalgo

== Trivia ==
- Andy Hug's coach, Jean-Louis Romule, a 26-year-old former kickboxer from Martinique, died on the evening of January 21, 1996, due to a congenital heart defect at Hug's training center in Lucerne, in the arms of Thorsten Domke.
- Thorsten Domke appeared alongside Andy Hug and Michael Thompson on the September 12, 1996, episode of “Casa Nostra,” hosted by Kurt Aeschbacher.
- Thorsten Domke was named Athlete of the Year in the “Men’s” category at the 4th Central Switzerland Sports Gala, which was hosted by Beni Thurnheer.
