= Federal Office of Personnel =

Swiss government agency

- (in German) Eidgenössisches Personalamt (in French) Office fédéral du personnel (in Italian) Ufficio federale del personale

- Federal Office of Personnel in Bern (2026)

Agency overview
- Jurisdiction: Federal administration of Switzerland
- Headquarters: Bern
- Employees: 160
- Minister responsible: Karin Keller-Sutter, Federal Councillor
- Parent agency: Federal Department of Finance
- Website: epa.admin.ch

The Federal Office of Personnel (FOPER) (Note: German: Eidgenössisches Personalamt, EPA, French: Office fédéral du personnel, OPFER, Italian: Ufficio federale del personale, UFPER) is the federal office responsible for human resources management, personnel policy and personnel training for the Swiss Federal Administration. It is subordinated to the Federal Department of Finance.
