= Value added tax (Switzerland) =

Value added tax is an indirect tax

Value added tax (Note: German: MWST; French: taxe sur la valeur ajoutée, TVA; Italian: imposta sul valore aggiunto, IVA; Romansh: taglia sin la plivalur, TPV) is an indirect tax levied by the Confederation on the basis of Art. 130 of the Federal Constitution. As of 1 January 1995 it replaced the goods turnover tax (WUSt) levied until then. The VAT is structured as an all-phase tax with input tax deduction.

Since 1 January 2024 the rates are 8.1% standard rate, 2.6% reduced rate and 3.8% special rate for lodging services.

With the exception of the mail order provision (Art. 7 Para. 3 Let. b VAT Act), the partially revised Value Added Tax Act (VAT Act) and the partially revised Value Added Tax Ordinance entered into force on 1 January 2018.

== Tax system in general ==
Value added tax is structured as an all-phase tax with input tax deduction. If a taxable person provides a service to another taxable person, the former must pay the VAT on the service; the recipient can reclaim the tax paid as input tax from the Federal Tax Administration (FTA), but must also pay tax on his services to his customer. This ensures that systematically only the added value in a value chain is subject to tax.

Domestic consumption is to be taxed. Therefore, supplies within Switzerland are taxed by the taxpayers. Deliveries from abroad are invoiced without Swiss VAT, but import tax and any customs duties and surcharges are levied at customs. The import tax can be reclaimed by taxable persons in the same way as domestic input taxes. Supplies to foreign countries are also not to be taxed. This is achieved through an exemption for deliveries or by the place of performance being abroad.

In this context, the law distinguishes between domestic tax on services provided by domestic entrepreneurs, reference tax on services provided by foreign entrepreneurs to domestic entrepreneurs, and import tax on the import of goods into the country. The tax is levied on the import of goods into the country.

== Domestic tax ==
=== Taxable turnovers ===
All supplies made by taxable persons are subject to domestic tax, unless they are expressly exempted from tax:

- supplies of goods made for consideration in the country;
- services rendered within the country against payment.

=== Taxable persons ===
Both legal entities and natural persons or associations of persons can be taxable persons if they operate a business and are not exempt from tax. According to Art. 10 Para. 1 VAT Act, a person operates a business if he or she independently carries out a professional or commercial activity with the aim of generating income on a sustainable basis and appears to the outside world under his or her own name. It is not necessary to also want to make a profit.

One is exempt from tax liability if one does not exceed the turnover limit of CHF 100,000; however, as an entrepreneur, one can also voluntarily subject oneself to VAT. Upon application, several companies can also be treated jointly as one taxable person ("group taxation"). Special rules apply to foreign entrepreneurs and non-profit organizations as well as sports and cultural associations.

=== Delimitation of domestic and foreign territory ===
The term domestic used in the text of the law does not correspond to the national borders of the Swiss Confederation. Article 18 of the VAT Act defines domestic. The following are considered domestic:

- the territory of Switzerland;
- foreign territories in accordance with treaty agreements. These include the Principality of Liechtenstein and the German enclave of Büsingen am Hochrhein.
- An exception is the valley communities of Samnaun and Sampuor, which are excluded from the Swiss customs territory. However, the Federal Law on Value Added Tax has stated that this law is nevertheless applicable in the two valleys for services. The two valleys must compensate the federal government for the tax losses resulting from this provision. Savings resulting from the reduced collection effort will be adequately taken into account.

The law defines foreign countries as all territories that are not located within the political borders of the Swiss Confederation or for which one of the exception clauses expressly mentioned in the law applies (entrepôt, duty-free ports, treaty agreements).

=== Sales qualification ===
==== Shipments ====
According to Art. 3 VAT Act, a supply occurs when an item is sold. However, the rental of goods (e.g. a vehicle) also constitutes a supply, even if the goods are returned at the end of the rental period. Furthermore, the processing of buildings and the processing of objects (production) are treated as supplies. Processing does not necessarily require adding or adding components. Washing clothes, for example, also constitutes a supply. In addition to movable and immovable goods, refrigeration, heat, electricity, gas and the like are also considered to be goods. The term "supply" is thus defined much more broadly in the VAT Act than, for example, in the EU. This approach is partly due to historical reasons and corresponds to the practice of the former WUST (goods turnover tax).

Examples: Selling edibles, e.g., at the bakery, cleaning the car at the car wash, changing a seal on a water pipe, selling software on a floppy disk, harrowing or plowing the ground, ironing shirts, dog grooming services.

==== Services ====
According to Art. 3 of the VAT Act, all services that do not constitute deliveries are considered to be services. Explicitly mentioned are also sales of intangible assets as well as compensation for actions or their waiver or toleration of conditions. Thus, it can be stated that everything that cannot be recorded with a delivery falls under the facts of the service.

Examples: Consumption of coffee and croissants in a café, radio/TV reception subscription, installation of software via data telecommunication, analysis work, provision of personnel, transfer of a patent for further marketing, planning services of the architect for a new building, advertisement in a magazine, mediation of a transaction between two parties, waste disposal service.

=== Place of taxable turnover ===
Whether a service is taxable depends on the place where the service is performed. Only domestic supplies are subject to VAT. In order to determine the taxability of a service, it is therefore necessary to examine what type of service is involved.

==== Place of shipment ====
Art. 7 VAT Act determines the place of a supply. The place of supply is the place where:

- the good is located at the time of transfer of the power to dispose commercially of it, of its delivery or of its being made available for use or exploitation;
- transport or dispatch of the good to the customer or to a third party on his instructions begins.

This means that the rental of a car is taxable where the delivery of the car takes place. Similarly, supplies of construction work are taxable where the construction work is located. Thus, if a Swiss construction company builds a house in Vorarlberg for a Swiss customer, this turnover is not subject to Swiss VAT.

==== Place of the service ====
Art. 8 para. 1 VAT Act determines the place of a service. Unless the law provides for an exception, the place of residence or place of business of the recipient is deemed to be the place where the service is provided.

Art. 8 para. 2 VAT Act determines a different place of performance for the following services:

- for services provided to physically present natural persons: the place where the person providing the service has his registered office or a permanent establishment;
- for services provided by travel agencies and event organizers: the place where the person providing the service has the registered office of the economic activity;
- in the case of cultural, artistic, sporting, scientific, educational, entertainment or similar services: the place where these activities are actually carried out;
- for hospitality services: the place where the service is actually provided;
- in the case of passenger transport services: the place where the transport actually takes place, measured in terms of the distance covered;
- for services related to a real property (management or appraisal of the real property, services related to the acquisition or creation of rights in rem in the real property, and services related to the preparation or coordination of construction works such as architectural and engineering works): the place where the real property is located;
- for services in the field of international development cooperation and humanitarian aid: the place for which the service is intended.

Thus, if a marketing company provides advertising services for a German customer in Switzerland, the place of performance is deemed to be abroad, which means that the advertising service is invoiced without Swiss VAT.

== Reference tax ==
If a Swiss customer purchases a service from abroad (for example, software from a German server) or a supply that is not subject to import tax (for example, foreign personnel for work on the customer's own machines), this service does not physically cross the border. In order not to disadvantage domestic service providers, it must be ensured that the foreign service is also subject to tax. This is done in such a way that the domestic recipient of a service settles the purchase with the FTA (reverse charge procedure). Therefore, taxable persons must account for all purchases of affected services from abroad with the FTA (purchase tax), but may claim the input tax deduction. Non-taxable persons (for example private individuals) must report to the FTA if their purchases of such services exceed CHF 10,000 per year. The tax administration will then send them a corresponding invoice (ruling). However, this procedure only leads to a limited tax liability for these persons (without the right to deduct input tax).

== Import tax ==
Imports of goods into the Swiss customs area are also subject to VAT by customs. The taxable amount is normally the consideration for the goods, otherwise the market value (Art. 54 para. 1 VAT Act).

In general, all postal consignments that have not been dispatched from the Swiss customs territory are also subject to tax. For reasons of administrative economy, tax amounts up to 5 Swiss francs are not levied. This tax amount corresponds to an assessment basis of 62 Swiss francs at the VAT rate of 8.1% or 192 Swiss francs at the VAT rate of 2.6%. An exception to this rule is made for the importing of consignments marked as gifts, for which a limit of 100 francs in the value of the goods applies.

== Tax rates ==
The rates of value added tax are laid down in Art. 130 of the Federal Constitution. There, the Confederation is granted the right to levy value-added tax on supplies of goods and services, including own consumption, and on imports at a standard rate of no more than 6.5 percent and at a reduced rate of no less than 2.0 percent.

Based on Art. 196 No. 3 Sentence 2 Letter e of the Federal Constitution, the Confederation is permitted to levy a further 0.1 percentage points for the financing of large-scale railroad projects. The Confederation was also authorized, in the form of a federal law, to increase the standard rate by a maximum of one percentage point and the reduced rate by 0.3 percentage points for the financing of the development of the old-age structure for the AHV/IV.

Based on the defined basic features for the design of the Federal Law on Value Added Tax in the Federal Constitution, the standard rate (7.7%) was composed as follows:

- 7.6% to levy a standard rate for supplies of goods and services
- 0.1% for the financing of large-scale railroad projects (NRLA)

Until the end of 2017, additional VAT financing of the IV by 0.4 VAT percentage points applied and from 1 January 2018 VAT rates increased by 0.1 percentage points due to the financing of the railroad infrastructure expansion FABI. From then, the normal rate of 7.7%, the reduced rate of 2.5%, and the special rate of 3.7% applied.

The reduced rate (2.5%), which was levied on supplies and own consumption of some everyday or agricultural goods (conclusively regulated in Art. 25, para. 2 VAT Act), is composed as follows:

- 2.4% to levy a standard rate for supplies of goods and services
- 0.1% for the financing of large-scale rail projects (NRLA)

The following goods and services are taxed at the reduced rate (selection):

- food and tap water
- medicines
- feed and litter for animals, as well as seeds, seed tubers and the like
- fertilizers, pesticides
- printed matter, books

A reduced rate can be levied by the federal government for accommodation services provided by the Swiss hotel industry. This amounted to 3.7 percent. The law defines an accommodation service as the provision of accommodation including breakfast, even if this is charged separately.

On 1 January 2024 VAT rates increased.

=== Evolution of VAT rates ===
Date	Mutation	Normal rate	Reduced rate	Special rate for accommodation services
01.01.1995	Introduction of value added tax	6,5 % (+6,5 %)	2,0 % (+2,0 %)	–
01.10.1996	Introduction of the special rate for accommodation services	6,5 % (+0,0 %)	2,0 % (+0,0 %)	3,0 % (+3,0 %)
01.01.1999	Increase in favour of AHV and IV	7,5 % (+1,0 %)	2,3 % (+0,3 %)	3,5 % (+0,5 %)
01.01.2001	Increase for the financing of large-scale railroad projects (FinöV)	7,6 % (+0,1 %)	2,4 % (+0,1 %)	3,6 % (+0,1 %)
01.01.2011	Increase for the reorganization of the IV (limited until 31 December 2017).	8,0 % (+0,4 %)	2,5 % (+0,1 %)	3,8 % (+0,2 %)
01.01.2018	Increase for FABI, decrease due to expiry of increase in 2011	7,7 % (−0,3 %)	2,5 % (±0,0 %)	3,7 % (−0,1 %)
01.01.2024	Increase in favour of AHV	8,1 % (+0,4 %)	2,6 % (+0,1 %)	3,8 % (+0,1 %)
01.01.2030	Expiring FABI supplementary funding	8,0 % (−0,1 %)	2,5 % (−0,1 %)	3,7 % (−0,1 %)

== Tax liability ==
=== Registration obligation ===
Companies that become liable for domestic tax must register with the Federal Tax Administration in Bern within 30 days without being asked to do so (Art. 66 para. 1 VAT Act). If they do not already have one, they receive their own Enterprise Identification Number (UID) and are registered as taxable persons. The UID replaces the previous VAT number, which could continue to be used until the end of 2013.

=== Subjective exceptions ===
According to Art. 21 VAT Act, the activities of board members, etc. are to be considered as dependent gainful activity and are therefore not subject to VAT. Art. 25 VAT Act lists further subjective exemptions from the tax obligation. These are farmers, foresters and gardeners for the sale of their own primary products (without purchasing third-party products), livestock traders and milk collection centres.

=== Tax exempt turnover ===
Deliveries (and in some cases directly related services) to foreign countries are not subject to tax, but entitle to input tax deduction. These are therefore genuinely tax-exempt transactions. The tax-exempt transactions are listed exhaustively in Art. 23 VAT Act. Exempt from tax are:

- the supply of goods directly transported or dispatched abroad (not applicable to the transfer for use or enjoyment of means of transport);
- the transfer for use or enjoyment, namely renting and chartering, of rail and air vehicles, provided that they are used by the recipient of the supply mainly abroad;
- domestic deliveries of goods of foreign origin that were demonstrably under customs control;
- the other transport or dispatch of goods abroad not connected with an export delivery, namely the transfer of tools abroad;
- the transport or dispatch of goods across the border in connection with the export or import of goods and all other related services;
- the transportation of goods within the country and all other related services, if the goods are under customs control and are intended for export (goods in transit without customs clearance);
- supplies, modifications, repairs, maintenance, chartering and leasing of aircraft used by enterprises engaged in commercial air transport or chartering, whose turnover from international flights exceeds that from domestic air transport; supplies, leasing, repairs and maintenance of items installed in such aircraft or of items for their operation; supplies of items for the supply of such aircraft, as well as services intended for the immediate needs of such aircraft and their cargoes;
- the services of intermediaries acting expressly in their own name and for the account of others, if the intermediated turnover is either exempt under this article or is effected exclusively abroad; in the case of turnover both in the home country and abroad, pro rata exemption on the turnover abroad;
- services rendered by travel agencies on their own behalf, insofar as they make use of supplies and services of third parties which are effected by the latter abroad; in the case of turnover both within the country and abroad, pro rata exemption on the turnover abroad.

Further provisions in Art. 19:

In order to maintain competitive neutrality, the Federal Council may exempt carriage in international air and rail transport. It has made use of this in the Ordinance, in that in international air transport the entire route is abroad if the airport of departure or arrival is abroad. Direct export under paragraph 2(1) occurs when the subject matter of the supply is transported or dispatched abroad either by the taxable person himself or by his non-taxable customer, without the latter having previously put the subject matter into use within the country or having handed it over to a third party within the country as part of a supply transaction. The subject matter of the supply may have been worked on or processed by agents of the non-taxable recipient prior to export.

== Methodology of tax calculation and assessment ==
=== Input taxes ===
==== Material requirements ====
Anyone who makes taxable or tax-exempt sales is entitled to reclaim the input tax incurred on these expenses from the FTA (Art. 38 VAT Act).

- If the taxable person uses goods or services for a business-related purpose referred to in paragraph * above, the taxable person may deduct the following input taxes in its tax return, which must be substantiated: *
  - the tax invoiced to it by other taxable persons with the information referred to in Art. 37 for supplies of goods and services;
  - the tax declared by it for the purchase of services from companies established abroad;
  - the tax paid or payable by it on the importation of goods from the Federal Customs Administration, as well as the tax declared by it on the importation of goods (Art. 83).
- The following purposes entitle to deduction of input tax:
  - taxable supplies;
  - taxable services;
  - transactions for which taxation has been opted;
  - free gifts of up to CHF 300 per recipient per year and samples of goods for business purposes (Art. 9 para. 1 let. c), as well as work on goods used for own consumption in accordance with Art. 9 para. 2.
- The taxable person may also deduct the input tax listed in paragraph 1 if he uses the goods or services for activities referred to in Art. 19, paragraph 2, or for activities that would be taxable if he performed them domestically.
- The right to deduct input tax does not apply to transactions that are exempt from tax, to activities that are not considered to be transactions or to private activities, or to transactions carried out in the exercise of sovereign authority.
- Also excluded from the right to deduct input tax are 50 percent of the tax amounts on expenses for meals and beverages.
- If the taxable person has purchased agricultural, forestry, horticultural, livestock or milk products from non-taxable farmers, forestry, horticultural, livestock or milk collectors for purposes that entitle him to deduct input tax under paragraph 2, he may deduct as input tax 2.4 percent of the amount invoiced to him. Art. 37, paragraph 1, letters a-e and paragraph 3 are applicable.
- The right to deduction arises:
  - in the case of tax passed on by other taxable persons: at the end of the accounting period in which the taxable person received the invoice (accounting according to agreed charges) or in which he paid the invoice (accounting according to collected charges);
  - in the case of tax on the purchase of services from companies domiciled abroad: at the time when the taxable person settles this tax with the Federal Tax Administration;
  - for the tax on import under paragraph 1 letter c: at the end of the accounting period in which the customs declaration was accepted and the taxable person has the original import documents.
- Insofar as a taxable person receives donations that cannot be attributed to individual sales of the recipient as consideration, his input tax deduction is to be reduced proportionately. Likewise, its input tax deduction must be reduced proportionately if it receives subsidies or other contributions from public authorities. Refunds, contributions and subsidies in respect of supplies abroad whose transactions are exempt from tax under Art. 19, paragraph 2, number 1 shall not be regarded as subsidies or contributions from public authorities.

==== Formal requirements ====
In addition to this material requirement, the formal provisions according to Art. 37 VAT Act must also be fulfilled. Thus, input taxes may only be reclaimed if the receipts contain the following information:

- the name and address under which it is registered in the register of taxable persons or which it uses permissibly in business transactions, as well as the number under which it is registered in the register of taxable persons;
- the name and address of the recipient of the supply or service, as it may permissibly appear in business transactions;
- the date or period of the supply or service;
- The nature, subject matter and scope of the supply or service;
- the consideration for the supply or service;
- the tax rate and the amount of tax due from the remuneration.

If the remuneration includes the tax, it is sufficient to indicate the tax rate.

While the FTA initially reviewed the aforementioned requirements in a very formalistic manner, the situation has since been alleviated. In particular, for the address of the recipient, all common and usual (if applicable) company names are now accepted (Art. 15a VAT Act). Nevertheless, the service recipient is well advised to insist on formally correct receipts in order to avoid unpleasant offsets. If a receipt subsequently turns out not to be VAT-compliant, this can be partially corrected with form 1550 - available on the Internet at www.estv.admin.ch.

==== Own use ====
If items that were originally purchased for taxable or tax-exempt transactions are now used for other purposes or withdrawn, the input tax must be corrected again in accordance with Art. 31 VAT Act. This is done by means of a declaration of own consumption.

A classic example of own consumption is the private use of business vehicles. Here, according to the practice of the FTA, 9.6% (12 × 0.8% per month) of the purchase price of a vehicle is accounted for as own consumption. For a vehicle with a purchase price of CHF 50,000 (excluding VAT), the own consumption amounts to CHF 4,800 per year. The tax (8.00%) amounts to CHF 384.

The free gift of goods also triggers the own consumption tax. Excepted are, on the one hand, gifts of up to CHF 500 per year and recipient and, on the other hand, samples of goods.

=== Accounting methods ===
Value added tax is collected at the border by the Federal Customs Administration and domestically by the Federal Tax Administration.

== Income ==
Income

Year	Revenue mio. CHF
1995 1996 1997 1998 1999	8'857 11'958 12'477 13'255 15'060

Year	Revenue mio. CHF
2000 2001 2002 2003 2004	16'594 17'033 16'857 17'156 17'666

Year	Revenue mio. CHF
2005 2006 2007 2008 2009	18'119 19'018 19'684 20'512 19'889

Year	Revenue mio. CHF
2010 2011 2012 2013 2014	20'716 21'687 22'095 22'561 22'614

Year	Revenue mio. CHF
2015 2016 2017 2018 2019	22'454 22'457 22'901 ------- -------

== Historical ==
On 1 January 1995 the goods turnover tax was replaced by the value added tax in Switzerland. At that time, the reduced rate was 2% and the special rate 3%. The standard rate was 6.2%, which was increased to 6.5% by federal decree in order to restore the health of the federal finances.

Based on the Federal Decree of 20 March 1998 on the increase of VAT rates for AHV/IV and the Ordinance of 23 December 1999 on the increase of VAT rates for the financing of large-scale railroad projects, the tax rates were increased in order to secure the financing of NEAT and the future costs for AHV/IV.

Based on Art. 130 of the Swiss Federal Constitution, the Federal Council may increase the rates by a maximum of 1% to 7.5% if necessary. It has exercised this right with effect from 1 January 2001. Added to this is 0.1% for the financing of major rail projects, making a VAT rate of 7.6%.

The Federal Law of 2 September 1999 on Value Added Tax (Value Added Tax Act, VAT Act) entered into force on 1 December 2001, after the expiry of the referendum period, and replaced the previous Federal Council ordinance.

On 28 November 2004 the Swiss electorate voted 73.8% in favour of the federal resolution on a new financial order, which also included an amendment to the Federal Constitution. On the one hand, various detailed provisions on VAT were removed from the Federal Constitution, and on the other hand, the old version of Art. 196 allowed the levying of a federal tax only until 2006. The result of the adopted reorganization was thus a "de-cluttering" of the BV and a further temporary grant of authority to levy VAT and direct federal taxes now until 2020.

The Confederation levied direct taxes for the first time in 1916, and only for two years - because of the First World War. But over time, these exceptional taxes became more and more frequent. In 1958, they were enshrined in the Federal Constitution, but for a limited time. The vote of 4 March 2018 was about the ninth extension, which was accepted by the people and the cantons.

== Current developments ==
=== Politics ===
In Switzerland, 26 different exemptions have been introduced since the introduction of VAT in 1995. Federal Councilor Kaspar Villiger already complained about the ever-increasing number of exemptions.

His successor, Swiss Finance Minister Federal Councilor Hans-Rudolf Merz, went further and launched the idea of a simplified VAT in 2003. In the spirit of a "flat tax" he proposed that in the future there should be no exceptions in Switzerland and that the current VAT rate of 2.5% on everyday goods, 3.7% on accommodation services and the 7.7% on all other services should be set at a uniform rate in the range of 5% to 6%. The Federal Department of Finance formulates the characteristics of an "ideal VAT" as follows:

- It is still designed as a net all-phase tax with input tax deduction.
- It only burdens final consumption and is levied according to the destination principle.
- It has no exceptions.
- It is levied at a uniform rate.

Liberal advocates of a unified value-added tax argue that this would free companies from costly and cumbersome accrual and accounting problems. At the same time, the tax system would be simplified. In the political debate, however, this proposal seems to have little chance of being realized. Among other things, the standard rate of 5 to 6% would lead to an increase in the price of basic foodstuffs (currently taxed at 2.5%), which would primarily affect the poorer sections of the population.

In mid-February 2006, the Federal Council decided that the Value Added Tax Act should undergo a total revision. As an interim solution, Art. 45a VAT Act was introduced as of 1 July 2006. This is intended to ensure that the administration no longer confronts VAT payers with unobjective additional claims merely for formal reasons. However, how this "pragmatism article" is to be implemented was still completely unknown.

In mid-February 2007, the Federal Council published the details and sent them out for consultation:

- The first "module" is described as the total revision of the VAT Act (today with more than 50 measures), which are intended to facilitate everyday taxation and create transparency and legal certainty, including the extension of the balance tax rate method, which enables simplified accounting.
- The second "module" under discussion is the flat rate of 6 percent, which is to replace the current rates (7.6 percent, of 2.4 percent for everyday goods and the special rate of 3.6 percent for accommodation services). Alternatively, a third "module" with two rates was presented - the standard rate of 7.6 percent, unchanged, and a reduced rate of 3.4 percent for basic necessities, as before, and now also for health care and other services now exempt. In particular, the health and social services sector, with around 23,000 companies, would be newly subject to VAT. One variant of this "module" provides for the continued exclusion of healthcare and parts of the social sector from taxation. The services of banks and insurance companies would continue to be excluded.

At the end of June 2008, the Federal Council proposed a flat rate of 6.1 percent.

On 17 December 2021 the Federal Council and the Council of States approved the indefinite proportional increase of the value-added tax by 0.4 percentage points in favour of the AHV as part of the reform of the old-age and survivors' insurance (AHV) "Stabilization of the AHV (AHV 21)." The deadline for a referendum is 22 April 2022, after which a vote by the Swiss people must be held within one year, so that the increase in VAT rates can be implemented in 2023 at the earliest. The Federal Council and the Council of States approved the indefinite proportional increase of the value-added tax by 0.4 percentage points in favour of the AHV.

==== Regulation for 2011 until 2017 ====
On 27 September 2009 the Swiss people approved a temporary increase in the value-added tax from 2011 to 2017 to provide additional funding for disability insurance. The standard rate is thus 8% during this period, the reduced rate 2.5% and the special rate for accommodation services 3.8%.

==== Initiative to abolish the value added tax ====
In June 2011, the Green Liberal Party launched a popular initiative to abolish the value-added tax (energy tax instead of value-added tax). According to the text of the initiative, this should be replaced by an energy tax on non-renewable energy sources. The tax should be 'assessed per kilowatt-hour of primary energy', whereby different tax rates can be set for the individual energy sources according to their overall ecological balance. A number of other optional provisions in the initiative text leave room for the legislator to design the tax: There can be exceptions to full taxation, and embodied energy can also be taxed additively to avoid distortions of competition. A rebate is planned for exports. With regard to the level of the energy tax, after a start at the level of the previous value-added tax, a fixed link to the gross domestic product is planned so that the state quota does not fluctuate unpredictably; the tax is thus to be neutral in terms of the state quota. Up to about 20 percent of the proceeds will be used to benefit old-age pensions and to subsidize health insurance premiums for lower-income earners.

Thus, not the work and the added value, but the energy should be taxed. In addition to the main goal of an energy turnaround towards renewable energies, high administrative costs for the federal government (approx. CHF 200 million annually) and high administrative costs for the more than 300,000 SMEs (approx. CHF 1.3 billion annually) could be saved with this request. The intention of the initiators was to make the energy tax, which was justified by the nuclear phase-out after Fukushima and the need for climate policy action, fiscally neutral, i.e. not to additionally burden the citizens; the goal was a 'cost-neutral nuclear phase-out'. The Green Liberals intended to 'additionally exempt consumers and companies from value-added tax' with an economy-friendly steering system. The Green Liberals wanted the tax to be 'neutral'.

After the initiative was submitted on time in 2012, the Federal Council and the Council of States basically supported its thrust in terms of climate and energy policy: However, very high energy taxes would be necessary to finance public budgets - estimated at over 20 billion Swiss francs, about 3 Swiss francs per liter of gasoline - and they would far exceed what can be justified in terms of energy and climate policy. In addition, the tax substrate would be smaller, unlike with the value-added tax, because the energy tax would have a steering effect; the tax would then have to increase. The complete abolition of the VAT would be wrong. The very high energy tax would also have negative distributional effects, since households with lower incomes would be disproportionately burdened. In the Council of States, the position of the initiative was represented by Markus Stadler (GLP/UR), but after the rejection of a counter-proposal by a commission minority led by Luc Recordon (Green/VD) with an incentive tax and reimbursement of the proceeds to the population (29 to 12 votes), the Council of States in June (34 : 3) and the National Council of Switzerland (171 : 27) in September 2014 also decided to recommend that the people reject the popular initiative. The counter-proposal with energy steering taxes was rejected in the National Council by 110 votes to 79. The Federal Council wants to replace the current support system for the energy transition from 2021, admittedly, also by a "climate and energy steering system", a consultation draft without abolition of VAT will be available in 2015.

=== Economists ===
An abolition of the value-added tax has been proposed by the Fribourg economists Reiner Eichenberger and Mark Schelker (published, among others, in Weltwoche 7/04.).

They list the following five main advantages:

1. The abolition of the value-added tax relieves the burden on all taxpayers, especially those on low incomes.
2. Especially for labor-intensive service companies, the value-added tax is practically a wage tax. Its abolition would greatly increase demand for simpler work. It would thus be an effective means of combating unemployment and the progressive impoverishment of low-skilled workers.
3. The administrative burden of VAT collection, which has been heavy for the federal administration and in certain sectors of the economy, would be eliminated.
