= Federal Office for Buildings and Logistics =

Swiss government agency

- (in German) Bundesamt für Bauten und Logistik (in French) Office fédéral des constructions et de la logistique (in Italian) Ufficio federale delle costruzioni e della logistica

Agency overview
- Jurisdiction: Federal administration of Switzerland
- Headquarters: Bern
- Employees: 900
- Minister responsible: Karin Keller-Sutter, Federal Councillor
- Parent agency: Federal Department of Finance
- Website: bbl.admin.ch

The Federal Office for Buildings and Logistics (FOBL) (Note: German: Bundesamt für Bauten und Logistik, BBL, French: Office fédéral des constructions et de la logistique, OFCL, Italian: Ufficio federale delle costruzioni e della logistica, UFCL) is the federal office responsible for central procurement and for the construction, operation and management of the real estate of the Swiss Federal Administration including embassies overseas. It is also responsible for federal publications, and for the production of Swiss identity documents. It is subordinated to the Federal Department of Finance.

== History ==
The FOBL was founded in 1999 through the merger of the civilian units of the Federal Construction Office (with Armasuisse taking responsibility for the military units, and the ETH board taking responsibility for the buildings of the polytechnic schools), and the Federal Central Office for Printing and Materials, which were previously managed by the Federal Department of Home Affairs.

== Full-time positions since 2001 ==
Raw data

"Federal Finance Administration FFA: State financial statements".
"Federal Finance Administration FFA: Data portal".

== See also ==
- Collection Center of the Swiss National Museum
