= Central Compensation Office =

Swiss government agency

- (in German) Zentrale Ausgleichsstelle (in French) Centrale de compensation (in Italian) Ufficio centrale di compensazione

Agency overview
- Jurisdiction: Federal administration of Switzerland
- Headquarters: Geneva
- Employees: 850
- Parent agency: Federal Finance Administration
- Website: zas.admin.ch

The Central Compensation Office (CCO) (Note: German: Zentrale Ausgleichsstelle, ZAS, French: Centrale de compensation, CdC, Italian: Ufficio centrale di compensazione, UCC) is the federal office responsible for implementing body for first-pillar social security, which covers old-age and survivors' insurance (OASI), disability insurance (DI) and compensation for loss of earnings (APG).

It is based in Geneva, with approximately 850 employees. It is supervised by the Federal Finance Administration, which is subordinated to the Federal Department of Finance.

== Full-time positions since 2007 ==
Raw data

Source: "Federal Finance Administration FFA: Data portal".
