= Federal budget of Switzerland =

Budget of the Swiss federal government

The Swiss federal budget (German: schweizer Bundesbudget) refers to the annual revenue (money received) and expenditures (money spent) of the Swiss Confederation. As budget expenditures are issued on a yearly basis by the government, the federal council, and have to be approved by the parliament, they reflect the country's fiscal policy.

The budget principles are defined by the Swiss Constitution and have been restated most recently in the 1999 fiscal guidelines of the confederation.

In 2014 the federal budget of Switzerland was 66.353 billion Swiss francs, or 10.63% of the country's GDP.

Note that the Swiss federal budget only comprises 31.7% of Swiss public expenditure, the rest being managed by the cantons, the municipalities, and the social security system. The Swiss Federal Finance Administration reports that the broader, general government sector (central + subnational + social security) in Switzerland had 2022 revenues and expenditures of 251.8 billion & 245.0 billion Swiss francs (6.8 billion CHF surplus).

== General overview ==
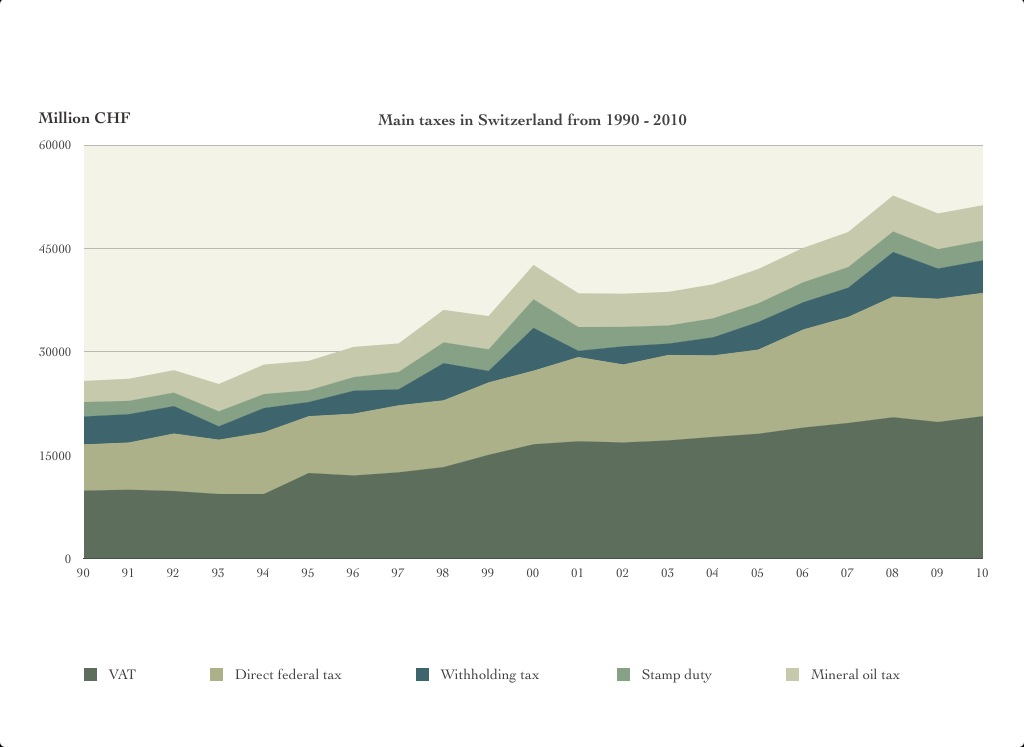
The development of five taxes between 1990 and 2010, which account for 80–85% of the annual revenue

As the federal system in Switzerland divides the nation into three levels of governance, confederation, cantons and municipalities, the federal budget refers solely to the revenues and expenditures at the national level. The regional (canton) budgets, as well as the budgets of the more than 2500 municipalities are not within the competence of the federal government or parliament. Their revenues and expenditures are therefore not counted as part of the federal budget, but they together amount to more than 60% of total public spending. However, the different budget levels are fiscally linked together. There are political instruments as for instance the "new fiscal harmonization"-law (Neuer Finanzausgleich), which regulate financial payments from the federal government to the cantons and municipalities as well as from the fiscally more to the fiscally less potent cantons.

Within these important frameworks many principles of distribution of money are regulated, as for example how different projects can be realised, using joint funds from municipalities, cantons and the confederation alike. In this sense, the different budget levels are fiscally interconnected, but politically separated from each other.

Although the right to decide upon budget expenditures ultimately resides with the parliament, these mechanisms of redistribution constrain its ability to exercise this right. Since these transfer expenditures are purpose bound by either legal or constitutional frameworks, they can not easily be changed and are therefore fixed in the short run. The amount of such fixed expenditures were at roughly 55% in 2010.

== Budget principles ==
In 1999, the Swiss government published its new fiscal guidelines which state the countries goals, principles and main instruments to achieve publicly beneficial fiscal policies. Challenges and necessary reforms to meet them are also conceptualised in these guidelines. Many of the proposed reforms are processes of which some have been realised in the meantime, as for example the above-mentioned new fiscal harmonisation law in 2008, and some are still under continued reform (i.e. the various social welfare programs). Generally, the federal budget has to function as the economical backbone of the government and allow it to realise its main goal, the welfare of the people. In order to achieve this overarching purpose, the federal council stated the three main goals of its fiscal policy:

- Goal of allocation: Resources have to be used and administered in a way that the resulting products are of the greatest possible use to the people. For this purpose a market oriented economy is the most efficient way of allocation. Therefore, for any given task market oriented solutions shall be sought.
- Goal of distribution: The distribution of market products amongst the people shall happen in a "socially fair" way. What counts as "fair" is part of a wide-ranging political discussion. The distributional goal of the federal budget has to respect and reflect the taken decisions and to amend the market oriented economy of the country by a "social dimension", thereby making it a "social market economy"
- Goal of stability: The federal budget shall be used in order to stabilise the economy. Therefore, the government shall strive to save resources in economically strong times, but stimulate the economy through investments in times of downturns.

Out of these goals the federal council has forged a list of budgetary principles including the principles of transparency, efficiency oriented investment, market freedom, public-private partnership, fair taxation, preferability of indirect taxes, balanced expenditures and more.

== Receipt categories ==
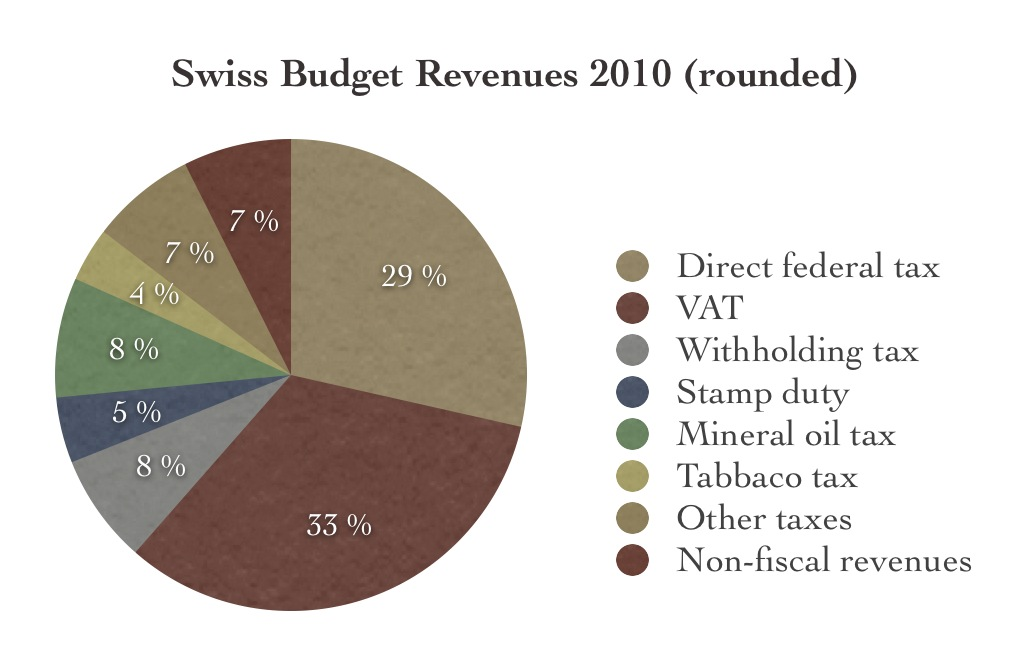
Switzerland's federal budget receipt categories in 2010 (rounded percentage)

The lion's share of the money the confederation has at its disposal comes from the federal taxes it collects. For the year 2010 92.6% of all the confederations income (a total of 62.833 billion CHF) were gained from tax revenues. The largest part of it, 32.9% came from the value-added tax (VAT). The second most important tax revenue in 2010 was the direct federal tax which contributed 28.5% of the whole budget. Additionally the withholding tax (7.5%), the mineral-oil tax (8.2%), the stamp duty (4.5%) and the tobacco tax (3.7%) as well as other taxes (7.2%) added to the total federal budget.

Over all, the revenue from these federal taxes in Switzerland is equal to approximately 10.5% of its GDP. Some of the non fiscal revenues of the federal budget are for example its share in the profits of the Swiss national bank (1.3%), revenues from different payments (2%) or revenues from investments (0.5%).

Since taxes are the main source for the budget, and because taxes fluctuate according to the yearly economical performance of a country, the revenue side of the federal budget is more difficult to predict than the expenditures. Revenue values in a newly constructed budget are mere expectations, constructed upon statistical models, whereas expenditures are the politically planned usage of money, and are therefore more easily predictable. In the case of Switzerland, especially the withholding tax prediction often turns out to be imprecise due to the tax's highly volatile nature. It can fluctuate in the range of several billion Swiss francs from year to year (e.g. from 5.3 billion CHF in 1998, to only 1.6 billion CHF in 1999). An analysis of forecasting errors between the years 2001 and 2010 revealed that generally federal revenues are being overestimated during times of recession. In the following periods of economical recovery they are usually underestimated.

== Expenditure categories ==
In the year 2010 the confederation spent a total of 59,266 billion Swiss francs (10.7% of GDP). The biggest part, 31.1% went to social welfare, followed by 17.1% that was spent for financial and tax purposes. Other expenditure includes 13.9% for the transport sector, 10.2% for education and research, 7.4% for national defence, 6.2% for agriculture and alimentation, and 4.4% for foreign relations.

Looking at past budgets, the expenditures of the Swiss Confederation have been growing from 7% of GDP in 1960 to 9.7% in 1990 and to 10.7% in 2010. The biggest change within the budget is happening in the sectors of social welfare and finance & tax. These two sectors have been growing from 35% in 1990 to 48.2% in 2010 and the Federal Department of Finance estimates that by 2015 they will account for more than half the federal budget expenditures. On the other side, during the same period, a significant reduction of expenditures has been occurring in the sectors of agriculture and national defence; from 26.5% in to 12.4% (estimation for the year 2015).

=== Example of budget ===
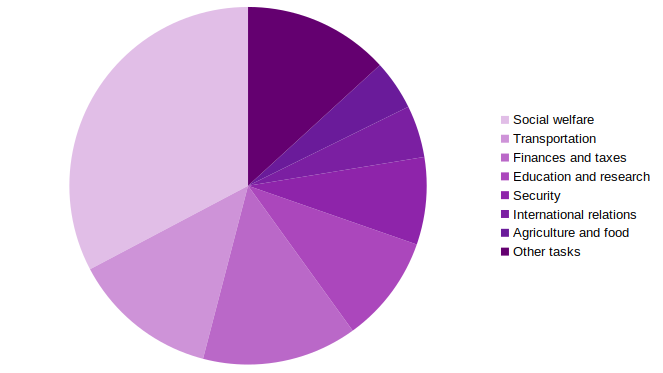
Pie chart of Switzerland government spending by sector for 2022

The budget for the 2026 fiscal year (also demonstrating the basic budget structure) can be found below (all values in billion CHF).

Description	Expenditures
Social welfare programmes	31.670
Finances and taxes	15.038
Transport and infrastructure	10.750
Education and research	9.001
Security	7.770
International relations	3.829
Agriculture and food	3.697
Other task areas	9.078
Total:	90.833

Looking at the federal budget in a different way professor R. Frey notes that "the [swiss] federal budget is to a considerable extent a transfer budget." What this means is that by looking at who uses the money (and not what it is being spent on) an overwhelming 74.6% (2010) of the federal budget is merely transferred to other institutions, as for example the Swiss cantons, municipalities and the various institutions of social welfare. In this view, the confederation uses merely 20.5% of its budget for own expenditures (personnel-, operating- and defence related expenditures). The reason for these low own costs are that in Switzerland the orderly implementation and control of national laws is often not part of the competences of the confederation but of the individual cantons. Exceptions are national defence, border control, foreign relations, etc. But other expensive posts such as schooling, police or public transportation are (mostly) organised and financed on the cantonal level.

== Issues and debates ==
The Debt Brake (Schuldenbremse)

Due to the development of budget expenditures in the 1990s, the Swiss parliament and subsequently the people, voted in favour of a new fiscal instrument to reduce government debt in 2001. The so-called debt brake was enacted in 2003 and reinforced the constitutional principle that expenditures have to be mainly financed by revenues and not through an increase in public debt. The mechanism of the debt brake works in a way that introduces a ceiling on spending that is being calculated on a yearly basis. There are adjustment punishments for exceeded budgets, which in turn will force public debt down in following years. Importantly all sorts of government expenditures are equally covered by the debt brake. The only exception to this rule are extraordinary spendings that have to be approved by both chambers of parliament. This exception is supposed to allow the government to react to emergency situations such as for example disaster relief or the 2008 UBS bailout.

Despite slow economic growth (even negative in 2009), the budgetary debt of Switzerland has declined from 130.3 billion CHF in 2005 to 110.5 billion CHF in 2010. That is a reduction of 15.2% of nominal debt.

== Notes and references ==
=== Bibliography ===
- Federal Council (1999). Finanzleitbild. Ziele, Grundsätze und Instrumente für die Finanzpolitik des Bundesrates (PDF). Archived from the original (PDF) on 22 May 2013.
- Federal Department of Finance (2012). Grundlagen der Haushaltführung des Bundes, Eidgenössische Finanzverwaltung EFD (PDF).
