= Federal Tax Administration =

Swiss government agency

- (in German) Eidgenössische Steuerverwaltung (in French) Administration Fédérale des Contributions (in Italian) Amministrazione federale delle contribuzioni

- Two buildings of the Federal Tax Administration in Bern (2026)

Agency overview
- Jurisdiction: Federal administration of Switzerland
- Headquarters: Bern
- Employees: 989 full-time positions(2026)
- Minister responsible: Karin Keller-Sutter, Federal Councillor
- Parent agency: Federal Department of Finance
- Website: estv.admin.ch

The Federal Tax Administration (FTA) (Note: German: Eidgenössische Steuerverwaltung, ESTV, French: Administration Fédérale des Contributions, AFC, Italian: Amministrazione federale delle contribuzioni, AFC) is the federal office responsible for federal revenue collection and the application of federal tax laws in the cantons. It is subordinated to the Federal Department of Finance.

== Tasks ==
The FTA collects various taxes and duties in Switzerland. These include:

- the value added tax (VAT)
- the federal direct tax (FDT)
- the withholding tax
- the stamp duty
- the military service substitute tax

Subdivisions of the FTA also take care of the application and enforcement of tax law, provide information on tax issues, further develop the tax system and help resolve international tax issues (e.g., double taxation agreements).

== Full-time positions since 2001 ==
Raw data

"Federal Finance Administration FFA: State financial statements".
"Federal Finance Administration FFA: Data portal".
