= Swiss Federal Pension Fund =

Pension fund for employees of the Swiss Federal Administration

PUBLICA Act
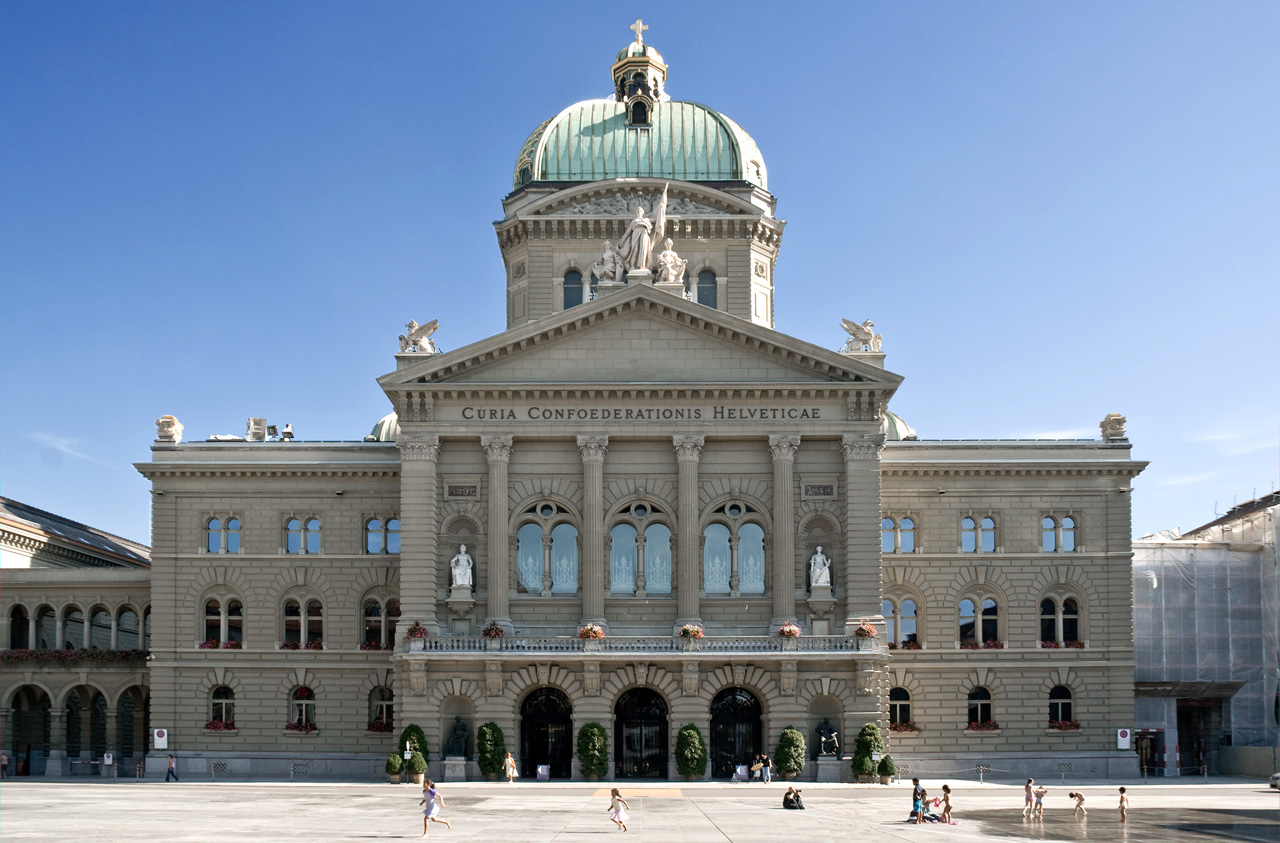

Federal Assembly of Switzerland
- Long title: Federal Act on the Federal Pension Fund (SR 172.222.1)
- Territorial extent: Switzerland
- Enacted by: Federal Assembly of Switzerland
- Enacted: 20 December 2006
- Commenced: 1 May 2007

Repeals
- Ordinance governing the Federal Pension Fund (1994)
- Status: Current legislation

Publica, Eigerstrasse 57, Bern (2026)

The Swiss Federal Pension Fund (PUBLICA) (Note: German: Pensionskasse des Bundes PUBLICA; French: Caisse fédérale de pensions PUBLICA; Italian: Cassa pensioni della Confederazione PUBLICA) is the pension fund of the employees of the Swiss federal administration, forming part of the second Pillar of the three-pillar Swiss pension system. It is open to employers affiliated with the Confederation or performing public tasks for the Confederation, a canton or a municipality. PUBLICA is established as a separate legal entity under the Federal Act on the Federal Pension Fund (PUBLICA Act) (Note: German: PUBLICA-Gesetz; French: Loi relative à PUBLICA, LPUBLICA; Italian: Legge su PUBLICA) and is administratively attached to the Federal Department of Finance.

== History ==
PUBLICA was established on 1 June 2003, replacing the former federal pension fund (PKB). The federal government assumed a CHF 12 billion shortfall to be financed over eight years. PUBLICA also inherited additional liabilities from the privatization of former federal enterprises. At launch, it served around 100,000 members, making it the largest autonomous pension fund in Switzerland.

By December 31, 2009, PUBLICA's financial position had recovered following the 2008 financial crisis. Its coverage ratio rose to 102.4%, up from 95.8% the year before, due to the gradual recovery of financial markets. The fund recorded a return of 10.13%, its best performance since its founding in 2003. Despite the gains, PUBLICA noted that its risk buffer remained thin at just over 2%, and improving risk-bearing capacity remained a priority.

As of 2011, PUBLICA was a collective pension institution consisting of 20 pension schemes, serving around 56,000 active insured persons and 45,000 pensioners, with total assets of CHF 32 billion. According to Swissinfo, despite pressure from declining stock markets, the performance of PUBLICA's portfolio was supported by broad diversification. Bond, real estate, and commodity investments were reported to have contributed positively. The coverage ratio on 12 August 2011 stood at 101.9 percent, compared to an estimated 83.2 percent average among other public-sector pension funds in Switzerland.

By 2021, PUBLICA covered around 66,800 insured persons and 42,000 pensioners. Its members included employees of the Federal Administration, the ETH Domain, decentralized federal companies, and around 60 other affiliated organizations. The fund managed CHF 44 billion in assets.

== See also ==
- Federal Department of Finance
