= Swiss Federal Audit Office =

Swiss government agency

- (in German) Eidgenössische Finanzkontrolle (in French) Contrôle fédéral des finances (in Italian) Controllo federale delle finanze (in Romansh) Controlla federala da finanzas

Agency overview
- Formed: 1877
- Jurisdiction: Federal administration of Switzerland
- Headquarters: Bern
- Employees: 130
- Minister responsible: Karin Keller-Sutter, Federal Councillor
- Parent agency: Federal Department of Finance
- Website: efk.admin.ch

The Swiss Federal Audit Office (SFAO) (Note: German: Eidgenössische Finanzkontrolle, EFK, French: Contrôle fédéral des finances, CDF, Italian: Controllo federale delle finanze, CDF, Romansh: Controlla federala da finanzas) is the supreme financial supervisory body of the Swiss Confederation. In this capacity, it assists Federal Assembly and the Federal Council. Its independence is guaranteed by the Federal Auditing Act.

== Description ==
SFAO is the supreme financial supervisory body in Switzerland, that is, a court of auditors for the control of public accounts. It assists the Federal Assembly and the Federal Council. Although it is administratively attached to the Federal Department of Finance, it is not hierarchically subordinate to it. It is independent and subject only to the Swiss Constitution and Swiss law.

The SFAO's role is to audit the financial management of the federal administration as well as certain semi-state and international organizations. The supervision of the Swiss National Bank and the Suva are explicitly excluded from the SFAO's mandate.

Since 2014, the SFAO has published its audit reports in a broad manner, which is an exception to the practice of other Swiss audit authorities. At the end of 2019, the number of audit and evaluation reports circulated amounted to 378 documents.

== History ==
The body was established in 1877 as the "Control Office" within the Finance Administration. It was renamed "Federal Audit Office" in 1882, when it received an explicit legal basis. The proposal to create a "Court of Audit" was rejected several times, and the SFAO's status and prerogatives gradually evolved.

At first, the SFAO was housed in the Federal Department of Finance. It moved with it to the Bernerhof in 1927.

It had about ten employees until 1914, before reaching a peak of 45 employees in 1917 in the context of the World War I. The number of employees then declined and reached a peak with the outbreak of the Second World War.

In 2017, the SFAO published a report criticizing the quality of the messages that the government submits to parliament with its draft acts, in particular a lack of impact analyses. As the report was published three days before a vote, the SFAO was criticized for interfering in the campaign and ended up apologizing and acknowledging a poor timing.

Information provided by the Swiss Federal Council during public votes is sometimes false, biased, or misleading, according to a 2026-report by the Swiss Federal Audit Office.

== Whistleblower ==
In 2017, after six years of experience, the SFAO set up an online platform for the anonymous exchange of suspected irregularities with employees, suppliers, taxpayers and anyone who wants to improve the efficiency of the administration and combat fraud and corruption. The SFAO is the official whistleblower's point of entry for the administration. However, federal employees are obliged to comply with Article 22a of the Federal Personnel Act (duty to report, right to report and protection).

In 2021, the SFAO received 402 reports, 228 of which were related to COVID-19.

== Full-time positions since 2001 ==
Raw data

"Federal Finance Administration FFA: State financial statements".
"Federal Finance Administration FFA: Data portal".
