= Federal Office for Customs and Border Security =

Swiss Federal Office for Customs and Border Security

- (in German) Bundesamt für Zoll und Grenzsicherheit (BAZG) (in French) Office fédéral de la douane et de la sécurité des frontières (OFDF) (in Italian) Ufficio Federale della dogana e della sicurezza dei confini (UDSC) (in Romansh) Uffizi federal de la duana e de la segirezza dals cunfins (UDSC)

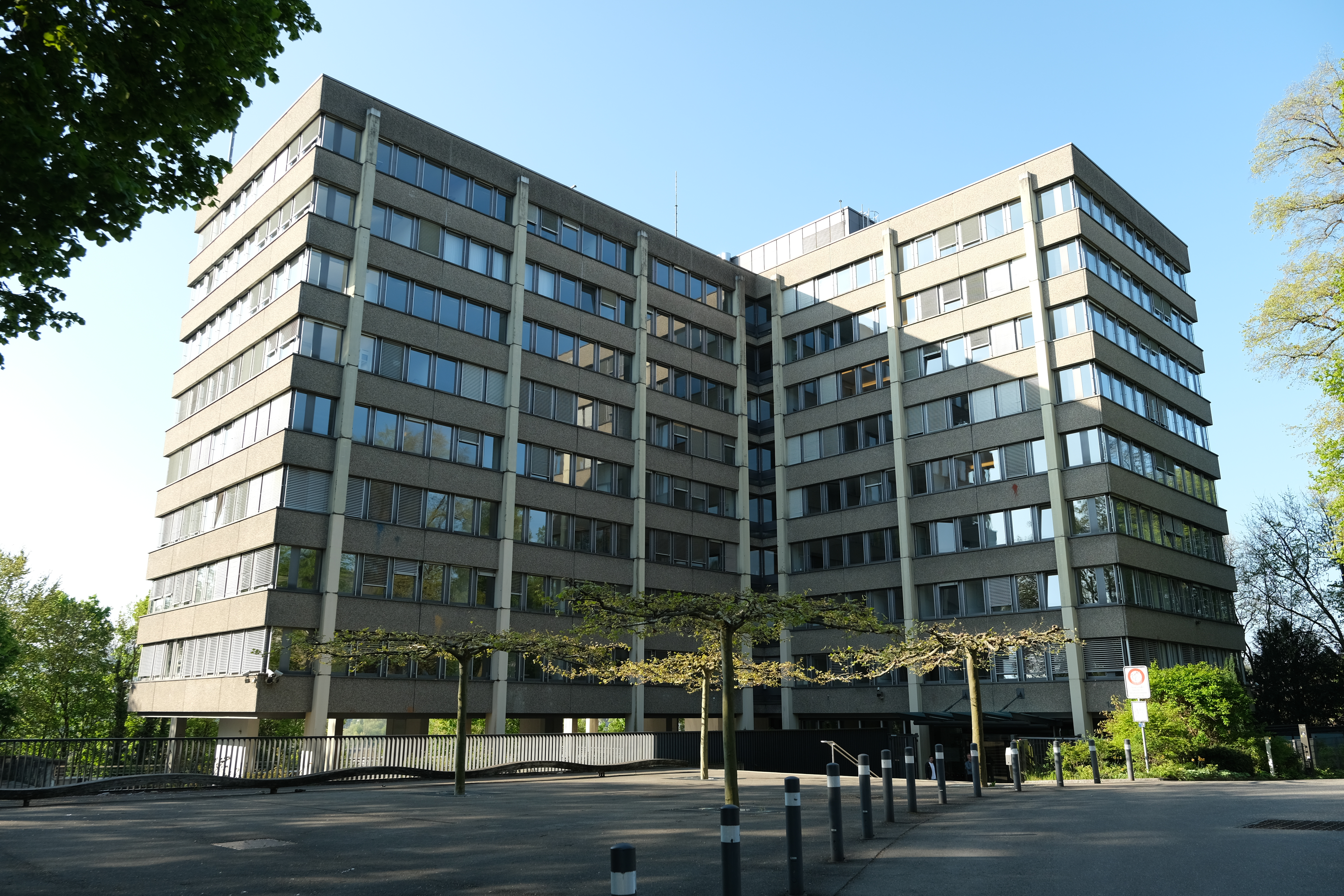
- Main building of the FOCBS in Bern

Agency overview
- Jurisdiction: Federal administration of Switzerland
- Headquarters: Bern
- Employees: About 4500
- Minister responsible: Karin Keller-Sutter, Federal Councillor
- Agency executives: Pascal Lüthi, Director; Marco Benz, Deputy Director, Head of Policy; Urs Bartenschlager, Vice Director, Head of Prosecution; Georges Dumont, Vice Director, Head of Risk Analysis and Analytics; Cédric Doleyres, Head of Operations; Bruno Wyssmüller, Interim Head of Planning and Steering, Head of Controlling; Birgitta Schweizer, Head of Support; Norbert Zurwerra, Head of Digital Services; Marie Jacot-Kuster, Head of Executive Staff
- Website: www.bazg.admin.ch/bazg/en/home.html

The Federal Office for Customs and Border Security (FOCBS) (German Bundesamt für Zoll und Grenzsicherheit (BAZG); French Office fédéral de la douane et de la sécurité des frontières (OFDF); Italian Ufficio Federale della dogana e della sicurezza dei confini (UDSC); Rhaeto-Romanic Uffizi federal de la duana e de la segirezza dals cunfins (UDSC)) is a federal agency of the Swiss Confederation. It is an office of the Federal Department of Finance.

Prior to 1 January 2022, it was known as the Federal Customs Administration.

== Tasks ==
Several thousand tones of goods cross the Swiss border every day. The FOCBS experts check whether the goods have been registered correctly, set taxes and duties, and ensure compliance with regulations to protect the population and the economy. Together with domestic and foreign partner authorities, the FOCBS also fulfills tasks in the area of security and migration in the border area, as well as in rail traffic and at airports.

== Organization and responsibilities ==
The headquarters of the Federal Office of Customs and Border Security is in Bern. The Swiss customs area is divided into six regions.

- Customs North: Basel-Stadt, Basel-Landschaft, Aargau
- Customs Northeast: Schaffhausen, Thurgau, Zurich, Zug, Schwyz, Lucerne, Obwalden, Nidwalden, Glarus
- Customs East: St. Gallen, Appenzell Innerrhoden, Appenzell Outerrhoden, Graubünden, Principality of Liechtenstein
- Customs South: Uri, Ticino
- Customs West: Geneva, Vaud, Valais
- Central Customs: Jura, Nauenberg, Bern, Freiburg, Solothurn

The Federal Office of Customs and Border Security is not only responsible for Switzerland but also for the German municipality and exclave of Büsingen am Hochrhein and the Principality of Liechtenstein. Until the end of 2019, the Italian municipality and exclave of Campione d'Italia was also a de facto Swiss customs area.

== Transformation ==
As part of the DaziT transformation program, the FOCBS will gradually develop further until 2026. In addition to process simplification and digitization, the legal basis will also be adjusted (total revision of the customs law). The previous professions of "customs specialist" and "border guard" will be combined in the new job profile of "customs and border security specialist", and work equipment and infrastructure will be geared towards greater flexibility and mobility. As part of this, the authority was renamed from Federal Customs Administration into its current name on 1 January 2022.

The reform efforts are sometimes sharply criticized. In particular, the planned expansion of powers, armament and uniforms were questioned.

== Full-time positions since 2001 ==
Raw data

"Federal Finance Administration FFA: State financial statements".
"Federal Finance Administration FFA: Data portal".

== See also ==
- Swiss Border Guard
- Swiss customs area
