= Federal administration of Switzerland =

Executive branch of the federal authorities of Switzerland

The logo of the Federal administration of Switzerland, in the four national languages

The federal administration of Switzerland is the ensemble of agencies that constitute, together with the Swiss Federal Council, the executive branch of the Swiss federal authorities. The administration is charged with executing federal law and preparing draft laws and policy for the Federal Council and the Federal Assembly.

The administration consists of seven federal departments and the Federal Chancellery. The departments are roughly equivalent to the ministries of other states, but their scope is generally broader. Each department consists of several federal offices, which are headed by a director, and of other agencies. The much smaller Federal Chancellery, headed by the Federal Chancellor, operates as an eighth department in most respects.

== Federal Council ==
The administration in its entirety is directed by the Swiss Federal Council, and the Federal Council and the administration are subject to parliamentary oversight by the Federal Assembly. Each member of the Federal Council is also, in his or her individual capacity, the head of one of the seven departments. The Federal Council has the sole authority to decide on the size and composition of the departments, and to make all executive decisions that are not delegated by law to an individual department, or to the Chancellery. The Council also decides which department its members are appointed to lead, although it is customary that Councillors choose their preferred department in order of seniority.

The absence of hierarchic leadership within the Council has caused the departments to acquire a very considerable autonomy, to the extent that the federal executive has been characterised as "seven co-existing departmental governments."

== Size ==
From 1954 to 1990, roughly two per cent of Switzerland's resident population were federal employees. This percentage has since declined due to army cutbacks and the partial privatisation of federal enterprises such as PTT (now Swisscom and Swiss Post). As of 2008, the Confederation employed some 102,000 people, all but 32,000 of which were working for federal enterprises such as the Post and the Swiss Federal Railways.

== Development ==
After the founding of the Swiss federal state in 1848, the Federal Council and its handful of officials took up residence in the Erlacherhof in Bern. The entire administrative staff consisted of 80 persons in 1849, while the postal service had 2,591 officials and the customs service 409. The first dedicated administrative building, now the western wing of the Bundeshaus, was completed in 1857.

The number of departments and Federal Councillors has been constitutionally fixed at seven since 1848. The number of the departments' subordinate entities, which are constituted by statute – generally as "federal offices" after the 1910s – has grown substantially in step with the expanding role of the state in the 20th century, even though some have been merged or abolished.

A 1964 government reform made the Federal Chancellery into the general staff unit of the Federal Council, and created General Secretariats as departmental staff units. A 1978 statute granted the title of secretary of state to the holders of two (later three) directoral posts whose functions require independent interaction with foreign authorities. Since the 1990s, New Public Management models have been experimentally introduced; twelve offices are now run with autonomous budgets.

== Location ==
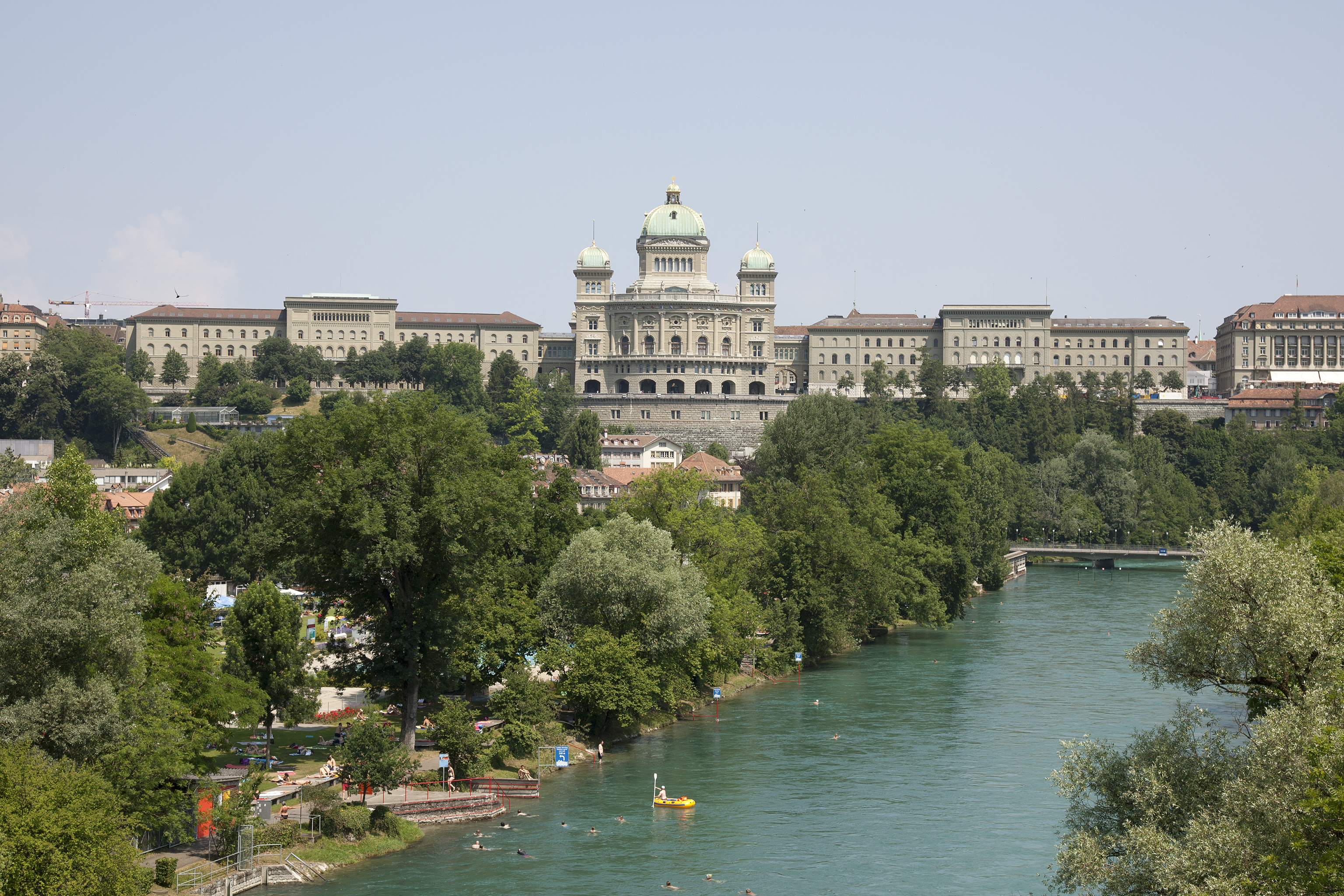
Governmental and administrative offices are located in the east and west wings of the Federal Palace of Switzerland, to either side of the central Parliament Building.

The seat of the federal authorities, including almost all of the administration, is Bern. The departments and offices are located in the east and west wings of the Bundeshaus and in numerous buildings in or close to the city center. In the 1990s, some offices were moved to other parts of the country, in part to aid economic development of these regions. Also, some federal authorities have field offices in other cities.

== Organisation and responsibilities ==
=== Federal Chancellery ===
The Swiss Federal Chancellery is the staff organisation of the Federal Council and the federal administration. As of 2024, it is headed by Federal Chancellor Viktor Rossi. It is composed of several sectors, the Federal Chancellery sector headed directly by the incumbent Chancellor, while the other two sectors are led by the Vice-Chancellors. The Federal Council sector was led by Rossi until his election as Chancellor, and has been led on an interim basis by Rossi's predecessor, Jörg De Bernardi. In July 2024, De Bernardi will be succeeded by Rachel Salzmann on a permanent basis. As of May 2024, the information and communications sector is led ad interim by Ursula Eggenberger, following the sudden death of Vice-Chancellor André Simonazzi.

For administrative purposes, the Federal Data Protection and Information Commissioner (FDPIC) is affiliated to the Chancellery. The Federal Data Protection and Information Commissioner is responsible for the supervision of federal authorities and private bodies with respect to data protection and freedom of information legislation.

=== Federal Department of Foreign Affairs ===
The Federal Department of Foreign Affairs (FDFA) is Switzerland's ministry of foreign affairs. As of 2019, it is headed by Ignazio Cassis (FDP/PRD). It is composed of the General Secretariat and of the State Secretariat, which in turn is composed of the following directorates and agencies:

- Directorate of Political Affairs: Led by the Secretary of State, responsible for coordinating Swiss foreign policy and administering Swiss foreign missions.
- Directorate of Corporate Management (DCM): Manages the Department's human and financial resources and provides legal advice.
- Directorate of Public International Law (DPIL): Responsible for the study and application of public international law.
- Swiss Agency for Development and Cooperation (SDC): Engages in development cooperation and provides humanitarian aid.
- Protocol section: Responsible for diplomatic protocol, ceremony and precedence.
- Integration office: Operated jointly with the FDEA and responsible for coordinating Switzerland's policy on Europe.
- Presence Switzerland: Responsible for promoting Switzerland abroad.

=== Federal Department of Home Affairs ===
The Federal Department of Home Affairs (FDHA) is Switzerland's ministry of the Interior. As of 2023, it is headed by Élisabeth Baume-Schneider (SP/PS). It is composed of the General Secretariat and the following federal offices:

- Federal Office for Gender Equality (FOGE): Responsible for gender equality matters.
- Federal Office of Culture (FOC): Responsible for national heritage preservation, archaeology, the federal art collections, the Swiss National Library, the Swiss National Museum and affiliated museums, as well as the support and promotion of Swiss culture.
- Swiss National Library: The national library of Switzerland.
- Swiss Federal Archives: The national archives of Switzerland.
- Swiss Meteorological Institute (MeteoSwiss): The national weather services.
- Federal Office of Public Health (FOPH): Responsible for public health at the federal level, including disease prevention, epidemiology, substance abuse, food safety, noise and radiation protection, regulation of chemicals and toxic products, stem cell research, bioterrorism and health and accident insurance.
- Federal Statistical Office (FSO): Compiles and publishes statistical information for use by the government, the economy and scientific research.
- Federal Social Insurance Office (FSIO): Regulates the Swiss social insurance and system, including old age and survivors' insurance, invalidity insurance, supplementary benefits, occupational pension funds, income compensation for people on national service and for women on maternity leave as well as family allowances in the agricultural sector.
- Federal Office for Food Safety and Veterinary Affairs (FSVO): responsible for ensuring food safety and protecting animal health and welfare

Additionally, the following independent authorities are affiliated to the FDHA for administrative purposes:

- Swiss Agency for Therapeutic Products (Swissmedic): Certification and supervisory authority for drugs and other medical products.
- Swiss National Library
- Swiss National Museum: the umbrella organisation for three museums – the National Museum in Zürich, the Prangins Castle and the Swiss National Museum in Schwyz, as well as the Collection Centre in Affoltern am Albis.
- Pro Helvetia foundation: promotes artistic creation and cultural exchanges in Switzerland.
- Occupational Pension Supervisory Commission (OPSC)

=== Federal Department of Justice and Police ===
The Federal Department of Justice and Police is Switzerland's ministry of justice. As of 2024, it is headed by Beat Jans (SP/PS). It is composed of the following offices and institutes:

- General Secretariat (GS-FDJP)
  - IT Service Centre (ISC-FDJP)
  - Post and Telecommunications Surveillance Service (PTSS)
- Federal Offices
  - State Secretariat for Migration (SEM): Responsible for matters relating to foreign nationals and asylum seekers.
  - Federal Office of Justice (FOI): Responsible for providing legal advice to the administration, preparing general legislation, supervising government registers and collaborating on international judicial assistance.
  - Federal Office of Police (fedpol): Responsible for intercantonal and international information, coordination and analysis in internal security matters. It also operates the domestic intelligence service (Service for Analysis and Prevention SAP), and the Federal Criminal Police (FCP), which investigates crimes subject to federal jurisdiction.
- Institutes
  - Federal Institute of Metrology (METAS): Provides calibration and accreditation services, supervises the use of measuring instruments and provides training in metrology.
  - Swiss Federal Institute of Intellectual Property (IPI): Registration authority for patents, trademarks and industrial design.
  - Swiss Institute of Comparative Law (SICL): Provides consultancy services on issues of comparative law.
- Commissions
  - Federal Gaming Board (FGB): Regulates casinos and enforces Swiss gambling law (except lotteries, which are regulated by the cantons).
  - National Commission for the Prevention of Torture
  - Federal Commission on Migration
  - Federal Commission for the Administration of Copyright and Related Rights
- Administratively assigned
  - Federal Audit Oversight Authority (FAOA)
  - Federal Commission for the Assessment of the Possibilities for the Treatment of Persons Interned for Life

=== Federal Department of Defence, Civil Protection and Sports ===
The Federal Department of Defence, Civil Protection and Sports (DDPS) is Switzerland's ministry of defence. As of 2025, is headed by Martin Pfister (CVP/PDC). It is composed of the following administrative units:

- General Secretariat
- Swiss Armed Forces
  - Land Forces
  - Air Force
  - Armed Forces Logistics Organisation
  - Armed Forces Command Support Organisation
- Federal Office for Civil Protection (FOCP)
  - Coordination of the civil protection services of the cantons and municipalities
  - National Emergency Operations Centre
  - Spiez Laboratory, responsible for weapons of mass destruction research and protection
- Federal Office of Sport: responsible for sport policy, the National Youth Sports Centre Tenero and the Youth and Sport organisation.
- Federal Office for Defence Procurement (armasuisse): Responsible for armaments procurement, technology and research
- Federal Office of Topography (Swisstopo): compiles and manages geographical reference data and maps
- Office of the Armed Forces Attorney General / Military Justice: The military prosecutor's office.
- Federal Intelligence Service (FIS): Switzerland's civil intelligence service.

=== Federal Department of Finance ===
The Federal Department of Finance is Switzerland's ministry of finance. As of 2023, it is headed by Karin Keller-Sutter (FDP/PRD). It is composed of the following offices:

- General Secretariat, including the Federal Strategy Unit for IT (FSUIT).
- Federal Finance Administration (FFA): Responsible for the budget, financial planning, financial policy, the federal treasury and financial equalisation between the Confederation and the cantons. Operates the federal mint.
- Federal Office of Personnel (FOPER): Responsible for human resources management, personnel policy and personnel training.
- Federal Tax Administration (FTA): Responsible for federal revenue collection and the application of federal tax laws in the cantons.
- Federal Customs Administration (FCA): Responsible for monitoring the import, export and transit of goods, collecting customs duties, traffic charges and taxes. Operates the Swiss Border Guard, which carries out border police duties.
- Swiss Alcohol Board (SAB): Regulates the alcohol market.
- Federal Office of Information Technology, Systems and Telecommunication (FOITT): Provides IT services for the federal administration.
- Federal Office for Buildings and Logistics (FBL): Responsible for property management, central procurement of non-durable goods, federal publications and the production of the Swiss passport.

The following independent authorities are affiliated to the FDF for administrative purposes:

- Swiss Federal Audit Office (SFAO): The federal government audit office. Examines accounting practices and verifies the proper and efficient use of resources by the administration, other public service institutions and subsidy recipients.
- Swiss Financial Market Supervisory Authority (FINMA): Regulates banks, insurances, securities dealers, investment funds and stock exchanges, as well as the disclosure of shareholding interests, public takeover bids and mortgage lenders.
- Federal Pension Fund (PUBLICA): Provides insurance coverage to employees of the federal administration, the other branches of the federal government and associated organisations.

=== Federal Department of Economic Affairs, Education and Research ===
The Federal Department of Economic Affairs, Education and Research (EAER) is Switzerland's ministry of the economy. As of 2019, it is headed by Guy Parmelin (SVP/UDC). It is composed of the following offices:

- General Secretariat, including the Federal Consumer Affairs Bureau FCAB (responsible for consumer affairs) and the Swiss civilian service agency (ZIVI).
- State Secretariat for Economic Affairs (SECO): Responsible for national and international economic policy, trade negotiations and labour policy.
- State Secretariat for Education, Research and Innovation (SERI).
- Federal Office for Agriculture (FOAG): Responsible for agricultural policy, for direct payments to Swiss farmers, and for Agroscope, center of excellence for agricultural research.
- Federal Office for National Economic Supply (FONES): Manages emergency supplies of essential goods and services.
- Federal Office for Housing (FOH): Responsible for housing policy.

The following independent agencies are administratively attached to the EAER:

- Price Supervisor: Price ombudsman and responsible for the supervision of regulated prices.
- Competition Commission: Swiss competition regulator.
- Swiss Federal Institute for Vocational Education and Training (SFIVET): Provides training for vocational education professionals.
- ETH Board, which itself manages the ETH Domain, a group of technical universities and research institutes. These include ETH Zurich (the Swiss Federal Institute of Technology in Zurich), the Swiss Federal Institute of Technology in Lausanne (EPFL), the Paul Scherrer Institute in Villigen, the Federal Institute for Forest, Snow and Landscape Research in Birmensdorf, the Federal Laboratory for Materials Testing and Research and the Federal Institute for Environmental Science and Technology in Dübendorf.

=== Federal Department of Environment, Transport, Energy and Communications ===
As of 2023, the Federal Department of Environment, Transport, Energy and Communications (DETEC) is headed by Albert Röstli. It is composed of the following offices:

- General Secretariat
- Federal Office for Spatial Development (ARE): Coordinates area planning between the federal agencies, the cantons and the municipalities.
- Federal Office for the Environment (FOEN): Responsible for matters of the environment, including the protection of plants and animals and the protection against noise, air pollution or natural hazards.
- Federal Office for Civil Aviation (FOCA): Regulates civil aviation.
- Federal Office of Communications (OFCOM): Regulates radio and TV stations, notably the Swiss Broadcasting Corporation.
- Federal Office of Energy (FOE): Responsible for the provision of electrical energy at the federal level, as well as for the supervision of dams.
- Federal Office of Transport (FOT): Responsible for public transport at the federal level, including the development of the federal rail network and navigation on the Rhine.
- Federal Roads Office (FEDRO): Responsible for the construction, maintenance and operation of the national highway network.

The following independent authorities are affiliated to the DETEC for administrative purposes:

- Swiss Transportation Safety Investigation Board (STSB, formerly Aircraft Accident Investigation Bureau and Investigation Bureau for Railway, Funicular and Boat Accidents).
- Federal Communications Commission (ComCom): Regulates the telecommunications market, awards service licences, rules on interconnection disputes and approves frequency and numbering plans.
- Federal Electricity Commission (ElCom): monitors electricity prices, rules as a judicial authority on disputes relating to network access and payment of cost-covering feed-in of electricity produced from renewable energy, monitors electricity supply security and regulates issues relating to international electricity transmission and trading.
- Federal Postal Services Commission (PostCom): Regulates the Swiss Post and Swiss postal market.
- Rail Transport Commission (RailCom): Arbitrates in disputes over access to the rail network and the calculation of fees for the use of infrastructure.
- Independent Complaints Authority for Radio and Television (ICA): Decides on complaints related to radio and television programmes.
- Safety Office (formerly known as the Civil Aviation Safety Office, CASO): supports the development of safety in land, sea and air transport, in the use, transport and distribution of energy, and for communications infrastructures
- Reporting Office for Just Culture in Civil Aviation (ROJCA): strengthens Just Culture through the protection of the information source of an occurrence reporting in Swiss Civil Aviation.
- Federal Inspectorate for Heavy Current Installations (ESTI): Responsible for inspecting low and heavy-current electrical installations.
- Swiss Federal Nuclear Safety Inspectorate (ENSI): Assesses and monitors security and radiation protection in Swiss nuclear installations.
- Federal Pipelines Inspectorate (ERI): Responsible for the planning, construction and operation of fuel pipeline systems in Switzerland and Liechtenstein.

== See also ==
- Government and Administration Organisation Act (Switzerland)
