= Federal Finance Administration =

Swiss government agency

- (in German) Eidgenössische Finanzverwaltung (in French) Administration fédérale des finances (in Italian) Amministrazione federale delle finanze

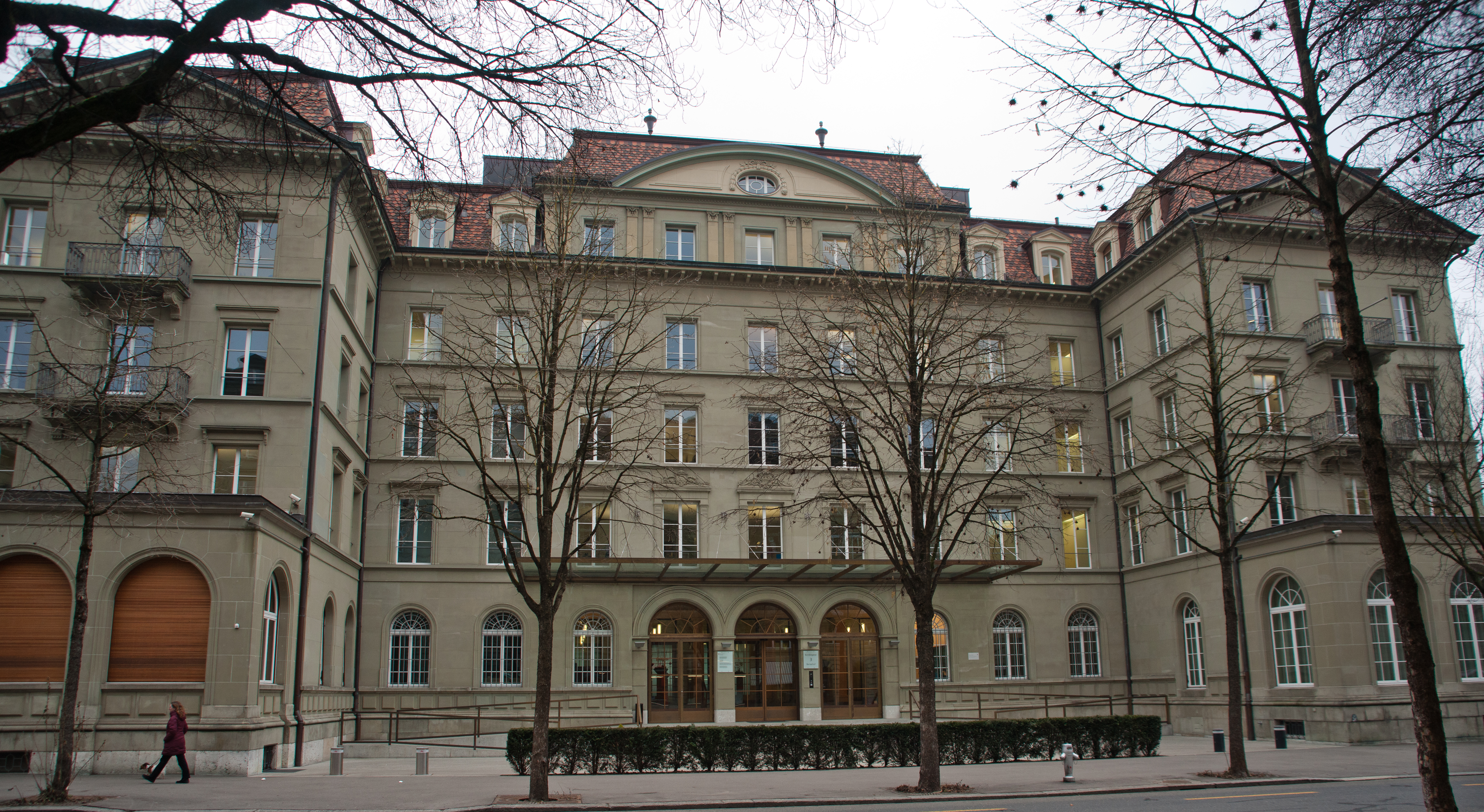

Agency overview
- Jurisdiction: Federal administration of Switzerland
- Headquarters: Bern
- Employees: 240
- Minister responsible: Karin Keller-Sutter, Federal Councillor
- Parent agency: Federal Department of Finance
- Website: www.efv.admin.ch

The Federal Finance Administration (FFA) (Note: German: Eidgenössische Finanzverwaltung, French: Administration fédérale des finances, Italian: Amministrazione federale delle finanze) is the Swiss federal office responsible for drawing up the Confederation's budget, financial plan and accounts, managing its treasury, and for the financial equalization between the Confederation and the cantons. It is subordinated to the Swiss Federal Department of Finance.

The FFA also supervises Swissmint (the official mint of the Confederation) and the Central Compensation Office (CCO) in Geneva (responsible for implementing the Swiss social security).
