= Alexander Zehnder =

Swiss microbiologist (born 1946)

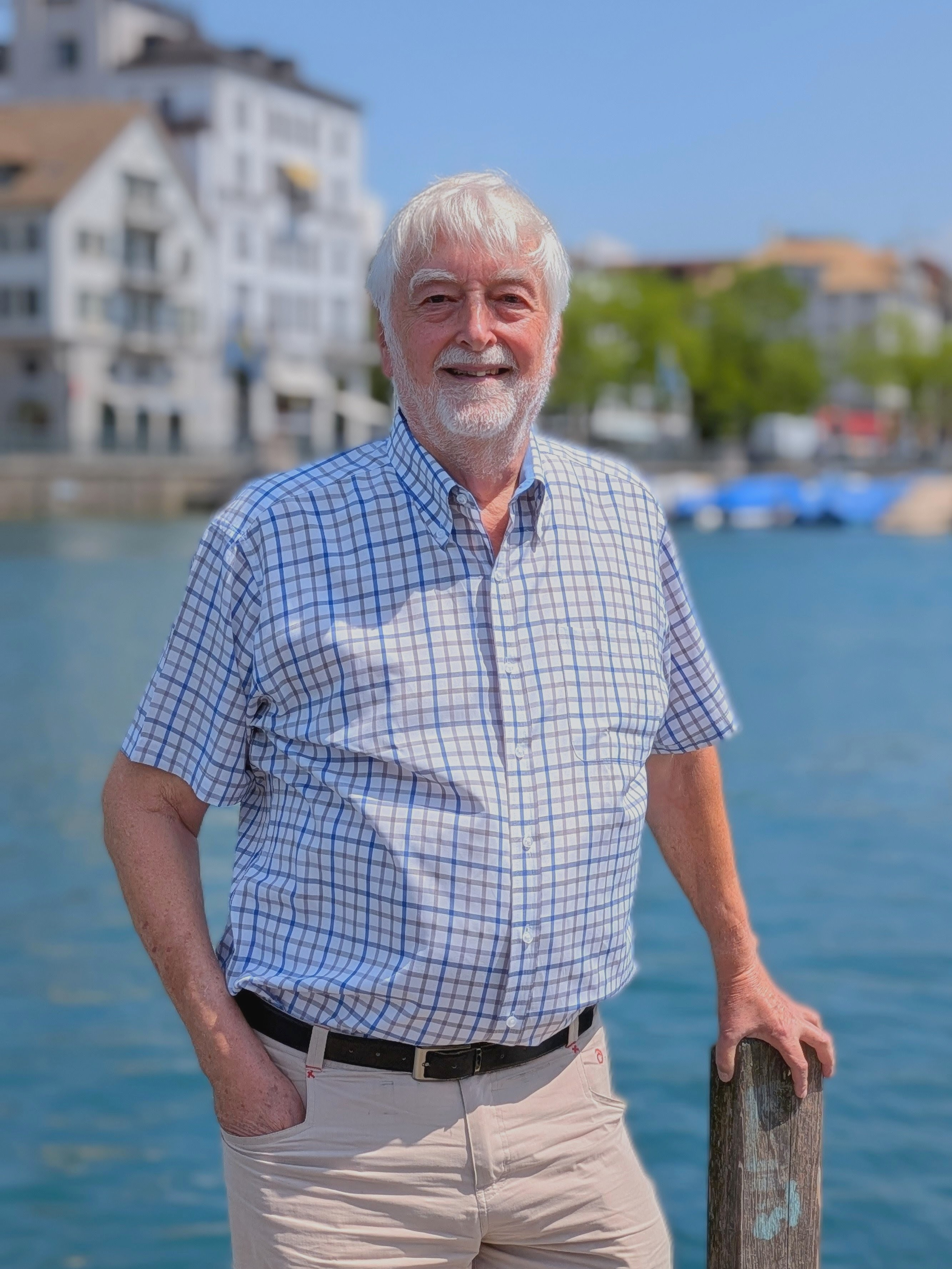
- Born: Alexander Jakob Boris Zehnder; 21 February 1946 (age 80); Goldach, Switzerland
- Occupation: Microbiologist
- Awards: Verdienstkreuz 1. Klasse (2010), Pingat Bakti Masyarakat (2019), Officer's Cross of the Order of Merit of Hungary (2025)

Academic background
- Education: ETH Zurich
- Thesis: (1976)

Academic work
- Institutions: Wageningen University & Research, ETH Zurich, Swiss Federal Institute of Aquatic Science and Technology

Alexander Jakob Boris Zehnder (born 21 February 1946), known informally as Sascha, is a Swiss microbiologist and environmental scientist. He spent most of his academic career as professor of microbiology at Wageningen University & Research (1983–1992) and later as professor of environmental biotechnology at ETH Zurich (1992–2004), where he simultaneously served as director of the Swiss Federal Institute of Aquatic Science and Technology (EAWAG). From July 2004 to December 2007, he served as President of the ETH Board, the governing body of the ETH Domain Switzerland's federal university and research system. He is known for his discovery of Methanothrix soehngenii, his virtual water research, his role as one of the founding figures of the 2000-watt society concept, and contributions to the development of the Dow Jones Sustainability Index.

== Early life and education ==
Zehnder was born on 21 February 1946 in Goldach, in the canton of St. Gallen, Switzerland. He studied natural sciences at ETH Zurich, completing his undergraduate degree in 1971.

Following his studies, Zehnder moved to Rabat, Morocco, where he worked as a consultant for the World Health Organization (WHO) until 1973. Returning to Switzerland, he pursued doctoral research in microbiology jointly at ETH Zurich and EAWAG, earning his PhD in 1976.

During his doctoral research, Zehnder discovered Methanothrix soehngenii, a methanogenic archaeon. The organism was formally described in 1982 in the journal Archives of Microbiology. Fellow microbiologist Willem Meindert de Vos later described it as "a major discovery" in anaerobic microbiology.

== Career ==
=== United States (1977–1982) ===
After completing his PhD, Zehnder worked as a research associate in the Department of Bacteriology at the University of Wisconsin–Madison with Thomas D. Brock from 1977 to 1979. He then served as an assistant professor in the Department of Civil Engineering at Stanford University, California, from 1979 to 1980. From 1980 to 1982, he returned to Switzerland as a lecturer at ETH Zurich and the University of Zurich, while also serving as a senior researcher at EAWAG.

=== Wageningen University & Research (1983–1992) ===
In 1983, Zehnder was appointed professor of microbiology and department chairman at Wageningen Agricultural University, Netherlands. During his tenure, research became increasingly focused on anaerobic and environmental microbiology, including studies on microbial phosphate removal and biofilm formation. A 1992 study by Jetten, Stams, and Zehnder in FEMS Microbiology Reviews found Methanothrix soehngenii to be the best-known methanogen capable of utilizing acetate at the lowest threshold concentration.

=== ETH Zurich and EAWAG (1992–2004) ===
In 1992, Zehnder took on the dual role of director of EAWAG and professor of environmental biotechnology at ETH Zurich, positions he held until 2004. Under his directorship, EAWAG became an independent institute within the ETH Domain and expanded its research profile in water quality, aquatic ecology, environmental engineering, and the degradation of pollutants.

During this period, Zehnder became one of the founding figures of the 2000-watt society concept — a vision aimed at reducing the average energy consumption per person in the developed world to 2,000 watts by 2050. The city of Zurich adopted this concept as a cornerstone of its long-term energy policy. His work also contributed to the development of the Dow Jones Sustainability Index, among the earliest global indices tracking the financial performance of sustainability-leading companies.

In the area of water policy, a 2003 study co-authored with Yang, Reichert, and Abbaspour in Environmental Science & Technology identified a quantitative water threshold beyond which countries become dependent on cereal imports. A 2002 paper in World Development demonstrated an inverse relationship between water availability and cereal imports in southern Mediterranean countries.

=== President of the ETH Board (2004–2007) ===
From July 2004 to December 2007, Zehnder served as President of the ETH Board, the governing body of the ETH Domain, which comprised ETH Zurich, EPFL, and four national research institutes — the Paul Scherrer Institute (PSI), EMPA, the Swiss Federal Institute for Forest, Snow and Landscape Research (WSL), and EAWAG — with a combined annual budget of over USD 2 billion at the time. During this period, he aimed to strengthen the international academic reputation of the ETH institutions. He formally retired in May 2008.

=== Alberta, Canada (2008–2017) ===
Following his retirement as President of the ETH Board, Zehnder served as Scientific Director of the Alberta Water Research Institute (AWRI) in Edmonton, Canada from 2008 to 2010. The institute was established to provide the scientific foundation for Alberta's "Water for Life" strategy. In this role, he set the scientific agenda for water research in the province, introduced the concept of virtual water to Alberta's policy discussions, and oversaw a multimillion-dollar research portfolio that funded projects at universities across Alberta.

In 2010, the Alberta government consolidated its research institutes into Alberta Innovates. Zehnder continued as Scientific Director of Water Resources within the Energy and Environment Solutions (AI-EES) division until 2017. Among his most significant contributions was providing scientific oversight for the Predicting Alberta's Water Future (PAWF) project, which produced a province-wide integrated hydrological model. He applied a framework balancing technology and innovation, laws and governance, and economics and financial incentives, and under his direction Alberta's water research adopted the Soil and Water Assessment Tool (SWAT) to map surface, groundwater, and soil moisture across more than 2,000 sub-basins in the province.

=== Nanyang Technological University, Singapore (2011–present) ===
Since 2011, Zehnder has served as a visiting professor at Nanyang Technological University (NTU) in Singapore, and subsequently as a member of its Board of Trustees. He leads the NTU Sustainable Earth Office (SEO), which coordinates the university's sustainability research and activities through the EcoCampus initiative. He chairs the Scientific Advisory Board of the Singapore Centre for Environmental Life Sciences Engineering (SCELSE), a Research Centre of Excellence that explores the role of microbial communities in urban and natural environments. He also serves on the International Advisory Board of NUS Cities and has been a member of The World Cities Summit Science of Cities Knowledge Council, Singapore.

Zehnder is a frequent speaker at the Singapore International Water Week (SIWW), advising on water policy, the water–energy–food nexus, and resilient urban infrastructure. He served as a member of the International Advisory Panel on Environment and Water Technology, Singapore. Through his consulting firm Triple Z Ltd, he provides advisory services on sustainable development and industrial water treatment, and has contributed to adapting 2000-watt society principles to Singapore's urban context.

He serves as a Steering Board Member of the Asia Carbon Institute (ACI), a Singapore-based non-profit focusing on voluntary carbon credits and technology-based climate solutions in Asia.

=== Hungarian Research Network (2023–present) ===
From 2023, Zehnder served as Chair of the Advisory Board of the Hungarian Research Network (HUN-REN) during a period of institutional reform. He led a comprehensive international review of the network's 18 research centres and institutes, assessing the competitiveness of Hungarian research at a global level.

His central recommendation was that HUN-REN should move away from a rigid public administrative structure and adopt a more flexible, independent model similar to world-class institutions such as the Max Planck Society or the ETH Domain. His reform strategy was built on three pillars: internationalisation, innovation, and impact. Following the formal restructuring of the network in early 2026, Zehnder became a founding member of the newly established International Scientific Advisory Board (ISAB).

== Research ==
Zehnder has published more than 250 peer-reviewed scientific papers and has supervised over 80 PhD students throughout his career. He is recognised as an ISI Highly Cited Scientist.

His research on virtual water trade — conducted at EAWAG with Hong Yang and others — has been published in Water Resources Research, Environmental Science & Technology, World Development, and Hydrology and Earth System Sciences. A 2007 review article by Yang and Zehnder in Water Resources Research is considered a key contribution to the virtual water literature.

His fields of expertise include water in both qualitative and quantitative aspects, the relationship between water and food security, and water scarcity in relation to climate change.

== Honours and awards ==
Zehnder was elected a member of the Royal Netherlands Academy of Arts and Sciences in 1990. In 1998, he received an honorary doctorate from the University Henri-Poincaré in Nancy, France. In 1999, he was elected a member of the Swiss Academy of Engineering Sciences and a foreign member of the Russian Academy of Sciences. In 2010, he received the Order of Merit of the Federal Republic of Germany, Cross of Merit 1st Class. Singapore awarded Zehnder the Pingat Bakti Masyarakat (Public Service Medal) in 2017. In 2019, he was elected a member of Academia Europaea. In July 2024, he received an honorary doctorate from Nanyang Technological University. In December 2025, President Tamás Sulyok of Hungary awarded Zehnder the Officer's Cross of the Order of Merit of Hungary for his contributions to Hungarian science and his role in the renewal of the HUN-REN network.
