= Günther Dissertori =

Italian physicist (1969-)

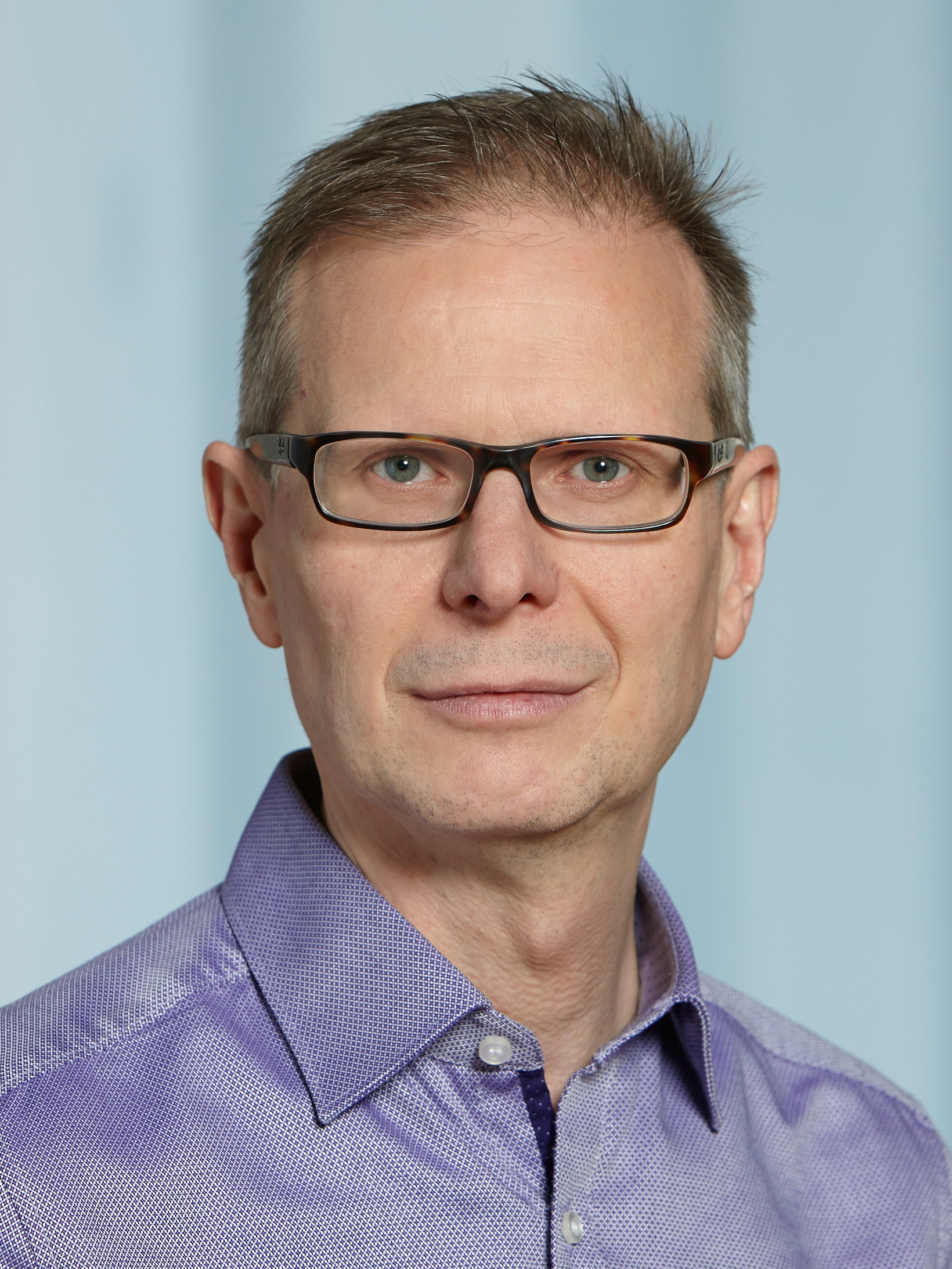
- Dissertori in 2019
- Born: November 24, 1969 (age 56); Meran, Italy
- Occupations: Physicist, Scientist, Educator
- Years active: 1997-present

Günther Dissertori (born 1969) is an Italian physicist, scientist, professor for particle physics and rector at ETH Zurich. At the beginning of 2027, he will become president of ETH Zurich succeeding Joël Mesot.

== Life ==
Günther Dissertori grew up in Algund, a village in South Tyrol, Italy. He studied physics at the University of Innsbruck and worked as a doctoral student at CERN in Geneva, where he began his research career. There, he worked with the ALEPH particle detector at the Large Electron–Positron Collider (LEP) on studies of strong interactions, which was the subject of his doctoral thesis in 1997. He continued working at CERN as CERN Fellow and then as member of its Research Staff. Together with ETH colleagues, Dissertori helped to set up the CMS experiment at the Large Hadron Collider (LHC) of CERN. These experiments allowed to prove the existence of the Higgs boson. With his group, Dissertori also developed new Positron emission tomography (PET) devices. A cost-efficient brain PET scanner resulted from this work.

In 2001, he started teaching as assistant professor at ETH Zurich. His promotion to full professor for particle physics occurred in 2007. Dissertori received the Golden Owl Award for best teaching, bestowed by his students, in 2005, 2009, 2015 and 2020. In addition, he was honored by the Credit Suisse Award for best teaching at ETH in 2013.

In February 2022, Günther Dissertori was elected as Rector of ETH Zurich.

== Selected publications ==
Author Günther Dissertori. ETH Library. Retrieved 2022-04-09.

== Memberships ==
- Fellow American Physical Society since 2016
