= ETH Zurich University Archives =

- Hochschularchiv der ETH Zürich
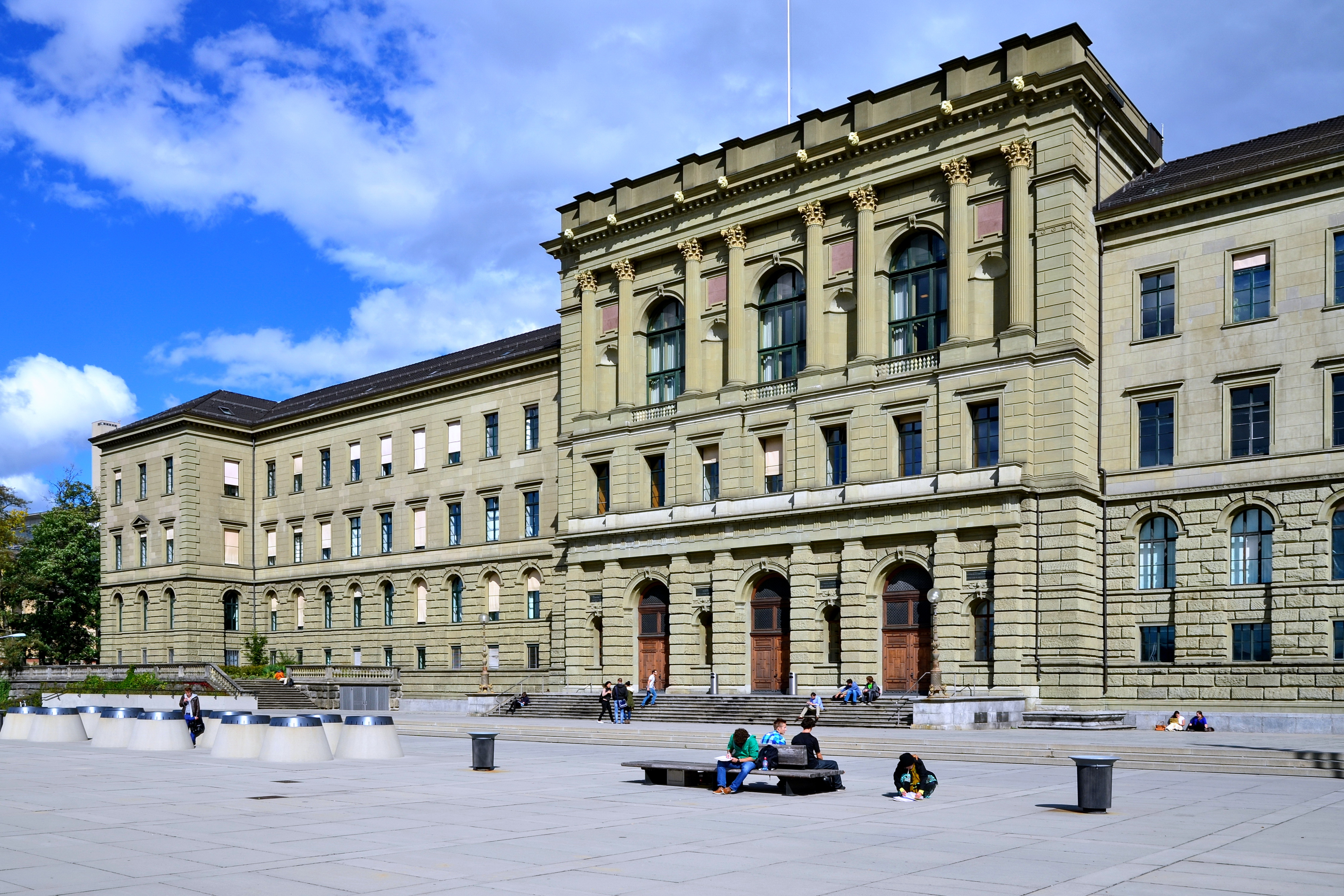
- The University Archives are located in the main building of ETH Zurich
- 47.37682377413173°N 8.54714168491619°E
- Location: Zurich, Switzerland
- Type: Scientific archive
- Established: 1999

Collection
- Size: about 4‘000 rm

Other information
- Website: ETH Zurich University Archive

The ETH Zurich University Archives are responsible for safeguarding, indexing and mediating documents belonging to ETH Zurich (founded in 1855) and the ETH Board. They also curate the private papers of scientists and societies with ties to ETH Zurich. Its holdings aid research on national and international academic, university and technical history. Biographical dossiers and other documents round off the archival holdings.

The ETH Zurich University Archives were founded based on the Swiss Federal Act on Archiving (BGA) of 1998:. Archival holdings from private personal papers, but also from ETH Zurich’s administration that had already been handed over in previous decades, were integrated in the University Archives.

== Content-related focuses ==
=== Institutional holdings ===
The institutional holdings stretch back to the foundation of the Federal Polytechnic School (now ETH Zurich) in 1855. For instance, the Historical School Board Archive (1854–1992) contains the minutes and files of ETH Zurich’s long-standing Executive Committee. These holdings also include the document archives of the ETH Board, the School Board’s successor (since 1993). From the subordinate units (from the departments and institutes to individual chairs), administrative documents, minutes of meetings, documents on research projects or congress reports that are of archival value are archived. Besides print documents, the ETH Zurich University Archives also archive digital data, such as historical websites in ETH Zurich’s Webarchive.

=== Private archives ===
The private archives available round off the institutional archival material. The individual holdings comprise documents such as lecture manuscripts and transcripts, unpublished manuscripts, field books and diaries, sketchbooks, architectural drawings and extensive academic correspondences. The private archives include engineers (e.g. Carl Culmann, Robert Maillart, Aurel Stodola), scientists (e.g. Albert Einstein documentation by Carl Seelig, Vladimir Prelog, Leopold Ružička, Rudolf Wolf), mathematicians (e.g. Paul Bernays, Heinz Hopf, Hermann Weyl, Eduard Stiefel, George Pólya) and even psychologists (e.g. C. G. Jung Collection). The archives of individual academic societies and associations with ties to ETH Zurich round off this group of holdings.

=== Holding additions ===
Theme-based holdings (e.g. Archives on the History of Atomic Energy in Switzerland) and Collection Material on University and Academic History constitute an additional focus.

== Searching / digital services ==
The archives offer the following online search options and access:

- Online searches in the archive’s indexing information (ongoing expansion)
- Access to digitized archival holdings (network platform, ongoing expansion)
- Access to the minutes of meetings of the Schweizerischer Schulrat (ETH Board) in full text
- Personal paper indexes: older search aids (PDFs) on selected personal papers
- Archival materials by and on Albert Einstein in a biographical context

== Building Exterior ==
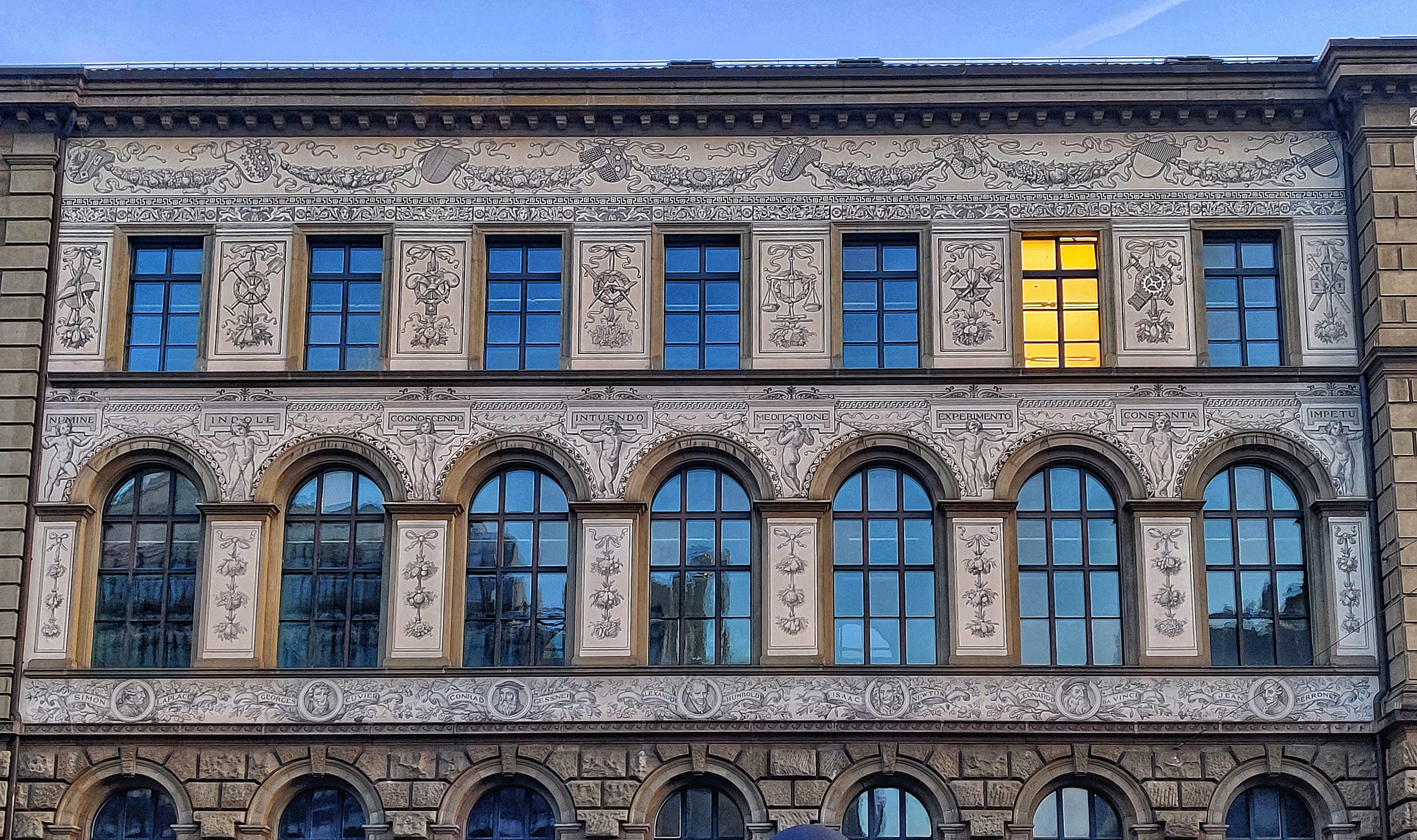

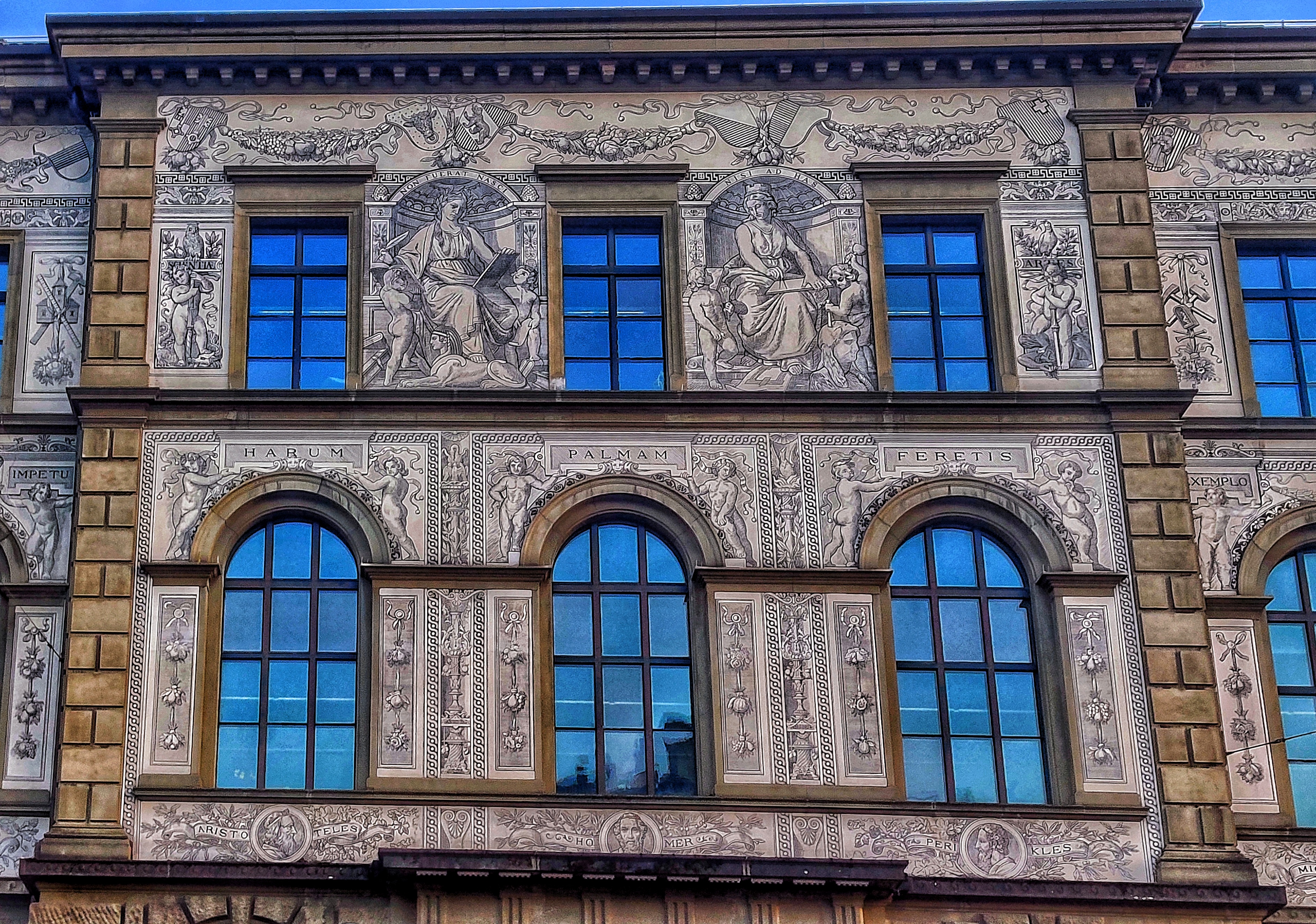

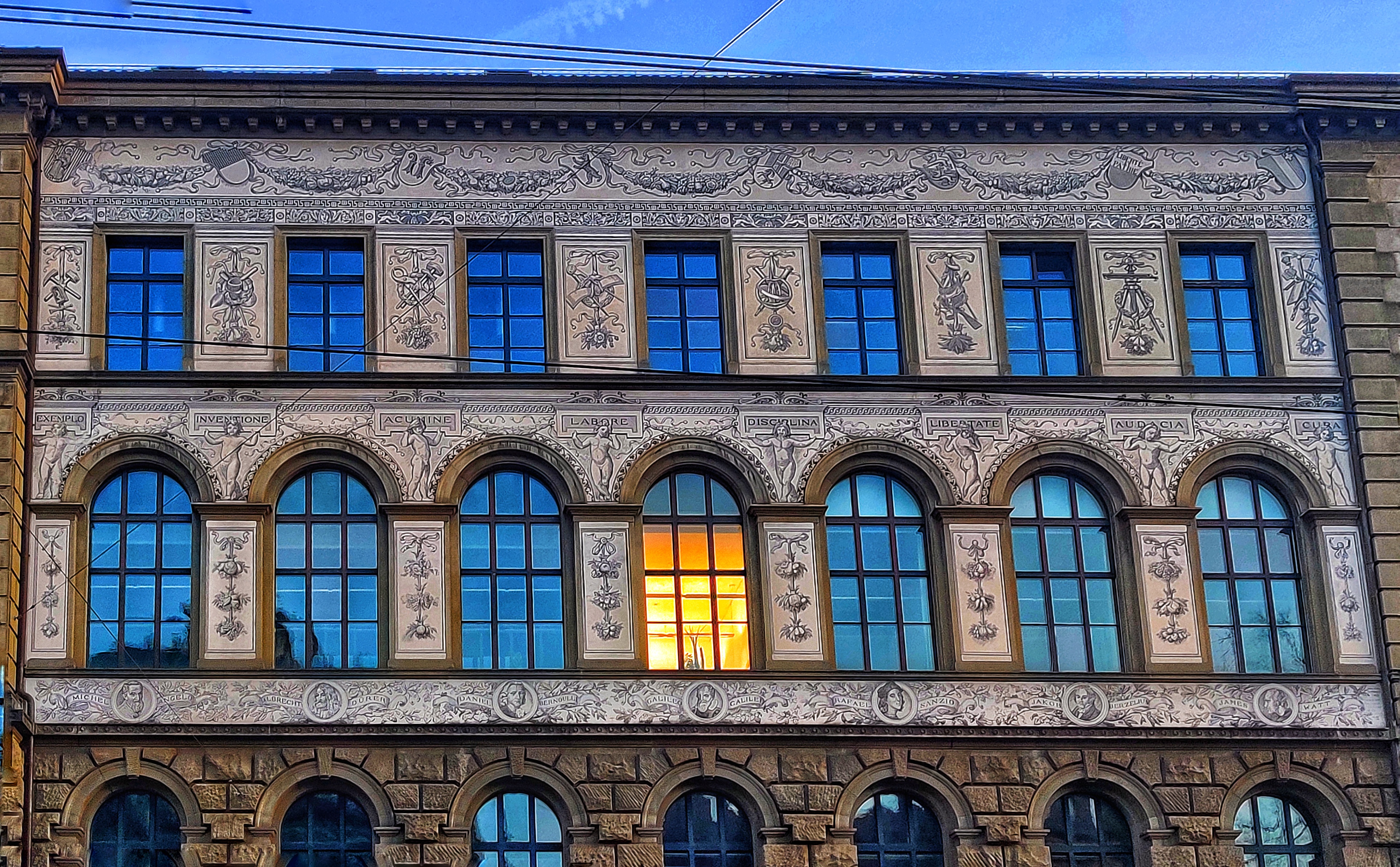
