= Swiss Electromagnetics Research and Engineering Centre =

Swiss Electromagnetics Research and Engineering Centre (SEREC)
- Founded: April 2007
- Number of Members: 300+
- Location: Zurich, Switzerland
- Website: http://www.serec.ethz.ch

The Swiss Electromagnetics Research and Engineering Centre (SEREC) is the sole organization for handling electromagnetic research and concerns in Switzerland.

The Swiss Electromagnetics Research and Engineering Centre, widely known throughout the electrical engineering community by its abbreviation serec, was founded in April 2007 by the Swiss Federal Institute of Technology in Zurich (ETH Zurich).

serec is a non-profit making interdisciplinary science network that, acting as a think tank, promotes electromagnetic (EM) research and development amongst academics, government and industry. It serves as a clearing house for distributing EM information.

Firmly based in the ETH Domain membership includes some 30 individual institutes of such technical universities as the Swiss Federal Institutes of Technology in Lausanne (EPFL) and Zurich (ETH Zurich), as well as many other engineering institutes at the leading universities of Switzerland. serec is recognized by 6 Offices of the Federal Government of Switzerland.

== Member organizations ==
Swiss Government Federal Offices:

- Swiss Federal Office for the Environment
- Federal Office for Civil Aviation of Switzerland
- Swiss Federal Office of Communications
- Swiss Federal Office of Energy
- Swiss Federal Office of Transport
- Swiss Federal Office of Metrology

University partners:

- Berne University of Applied Sciences, Department of Electrical and Communication Engineering:
  - Industrial Electronics
  - Telecommunications
- Swiss Federal Institute of Technology Zurich (ETH Zurich), Department of Information Technology & Electrical Engineering (D-ITET):
  - Biomedical Engineering (Biosenors & Bioelectronics) and (Magnetic Resonance)
  - Communication Technology (Communication Theory, Wireless Communications)
  - Electrical Power Transmission (High Voltage, Power Systems)
  - Electromagnetic Fields and Microwave Electronics (Computational Optics, Electromagnetics in Medicine & Biology, Terahertz Electronics)
  - Electronics (Electronics, High Speed Electronics & Photonics)
  - Integrated Systems (Analogue & Mixed Signal Design)
  - Power Electronics Systems
- Swiss Federal Institute of Technology Zurich (ETH Zurich), Department of Mathematics:
  - Seminar for Applied Mathematics
- Swiss Federal Institute of Technology Zurich (ETH Zurich), Department of Materials:
  - Crystallography, Functional Materials
  - Institute for Polymers
  - Multifunctional Materials
- Swiss Federal Institute of Technology Zurich (ETH Zurich), Department of Mechanical & Process Engineering:
  - Micro and Nanosystems
  - Robotics and Intelligent Systems
  - Centre of Economic Research
  - Technology and Innovation Management
- Swiss Federal Institute of Technology Zurich (ETH Zurich), Department of Physics:
  - Astronomy
  - Solid-State Physics
- Swiss Federal Laboratories for Materials Testing & Research (EMPA):
  - Information, Reliability & Simulation Technology (Electronics/Metrology)
  - Materials & Systems for the Protection & Wellbeing of the Body (Materials-Biology Interaction)
  - Information, Reliability & Simulation Technology (Technology & Society)
- University of Zurich
  - Functional Genomics Centre
- Swiss Research Foundation on Mobile Communication
- University of Applied Sciences of Western Switzerland, Business & Engineering School VD, Department of Information & Communication Technologies
- Lucerne University of Applied Sciences and Arts, Engineering & Architecture (Efficient Energy Systems)
- Zurich University of Applied Sciences (HSZ-T), Computational Electromagnetics and Applied R+D
- University of Applied Science Rapperswil, Department of Electrical Engineering, Communication Systems
- Swiss Federal Institute of Technology Lausanne (EPFL):
  - Industrial Electronics
  - Electromagnetics and Acoustics
  - Electric Power Systems
  - Electromagnetic Compatibility
- University of Applied Sciences of Southern Switzerland, Department of Technical Innovation (Telecommunication, Telematics & HF Systems)
- University of Adelaide, Australia, Department of RF & Electromagnetics
- University of Basle, Department of Physics & Astronomy (Nano-Electronics)
- University of Berne, Department of Applied Physics (Biomedical Photonics, Laser Physics, MM-wave & THz Optics, Microwave Physics, Quasi Optics)
- University of Duisburg-Essen, Germany, Department of Electrical & IT Engineering (General & Theoretical Electrical Engineering (ATE))
- University of Neuchâtel, Department of Microtechnology (Applied Optics, Electronics & Signal Processing)
- Zurich University of Applied Sciences/ZHAW, Department of Engineering (Competence Centre: Safety & Risk Prevention, Engineering, Digital Signalling, Sustainable Development) and Department of Research and Development
