= Conscientious objection in Switzerland =

Conscientious objection in Switzerland refers to the refusal to perform obligatory military service on grounds of conscience. The practice is grounded in article 18 of the Federal Constitution of Switzerland, inscribed in 1874, though conscientious objection has been documented in the Swiss Confederation since the Late Middle Ages. Until 1927, conscientious objection was treated as desertion and severely punished. Today, Switzerland recognizes both military and alternative civilian service as legitimate options for those called to serve.

== History ==
=== Early history ===
Conscientious objection emerged in Switzerland in the 16th century among the Anabaptists, who refused armed service on religious grounds. The phenomenon gained momentum in the late 19th century, with voices calling for its decriminalization through antimilitarist and pacifist movements. In 1903, a petition launched by reform advocates—which was rejected by the Federal Council—initiated political debate on introducing an alternative civilian service.

=== Legal framework (1927–1990) ===
The 1927 Military Criminal Code (article 81) distinguished conscientious objection from desertion for the first time but did not decriminalize it. A 1950 revision brought significant concessions for those refusing service on religious or serious moral grounds, including civil imprisonment and the abolition of dishonorable penalties.

During World War II and until the late 1950s, support for civilian service remained limited, with an average of only ten convictions annually for refusing service. However, the number of refusals began increasing in the early 1960s and accelerated significantly from the 1970s onward, reaching a peak in 1984 with 788 refusals to serve, of which 360 were based on conscience. Public concern about the issue grew accordingly.

The 1967 revision of the Military Penal Code broadened the recognition of conscientious objection by extending grounds beyond religious motives to include ethical ones. Prison sentences for "genuine objectors" were reduced, and exemptions from armed service were facilitated. Simultaneously, civil service advocates pursued constitutional reform. Two popular initiatives on the matter were rejected by voters in 1977 and 1984.

=== Legalization (1990–1996) ===
A third constitutional initiative prompted Parliament to undertake and approve in 1990 a revision of the Military Penal Code, known as the "Barras reform." This reform decriminalized the refusal of military service for reasons of conscience without abolishing the obligation to serve; objectors were instead required to perform civil work. As the reform left the assessment of motives to military tribunals, it was subject to a referendum but was accepted in 1991 by almost 56% of votes. The organization of civilian service was entrusted to the Federal Office of Industry, Crafts and Labor.

A petition launched in 1989 by socialist National Councillor Helmut Hubacher led to the constitutional inscription of civil service (revision of article 18, approved in 1992 by 82.5% of voters; article 59 of the 1999 Federal Constitution). While mandatory military service was maintained, the law provided for an alternative civil service for those demonstrating credibly, through a "conscience examination," that they could not reconcile military service with their conscience. The Civil Service Act and its implementing ordinance came into force in 1996, with the civil service body falling under the Federal Department of Economic Affairs, Education and Research.

=== Civil service ===
Between 2000 and 2008, approximately 1,200 to 2,000 men annually refused to serve. The conscience examination, deemed too complicated, was abolished in 2009 and replaced by "proof through action", requiring conscientious objectors to perform civilian service lasting one and a half times longer than military service. Between 2011 and 2017, the number of civilian service participants nonetheless increased from approximately 4,700 to 6,800. Not only future recruits but also many soldiers who had already completed basic training, as well as officers and specialists such as physicians, chose civilian service. The growing social acceptance of conscientious objection was reflected not only in the rise of civil service applications but also in the creation in 2019 of the Federal Office for Civilian Service (CIVI) to replace the previous executing body.

To counter the popularity of civilian service, centre-right political parties attempted from 2017 onward to modify the law. In its message of 20 February 2019, the Federal Council affirmed its intention to better enforce the principle that there is no free choice between military and civilian service. Civilian service was thus to be made less attractive, and stricter requirements regarding "proof through action" were proposed. Unexpectedly, this project failed during the final vote in the National Council on 19 June 2020.

Motions and initiatives to rehabilitate objectors who had been convicted in the past—including one by Socialist National Councillor Peter Vollmer (1998) and another by green National Councillor Lisa Mazzone (2018)—were rejected at the parliamentary level in 2000 and 2019 respectively.

== See also ==
- Military justice in Switzerland

== Bibliography ==
- Wyder, Theodor: Wehrpflicht und Militärdienstverweigerung. Entstehung, Gesetz, Arten und Sanktionen in der Schweizer Armee, 1988.
- Léonardis, Marie-Thérèse de: L'objection de conscience en droit public suisse. Contribution à l'étude du droit constitutionnel et du droit pénal militaire, 1990.
