= Polyball =

Annual dance

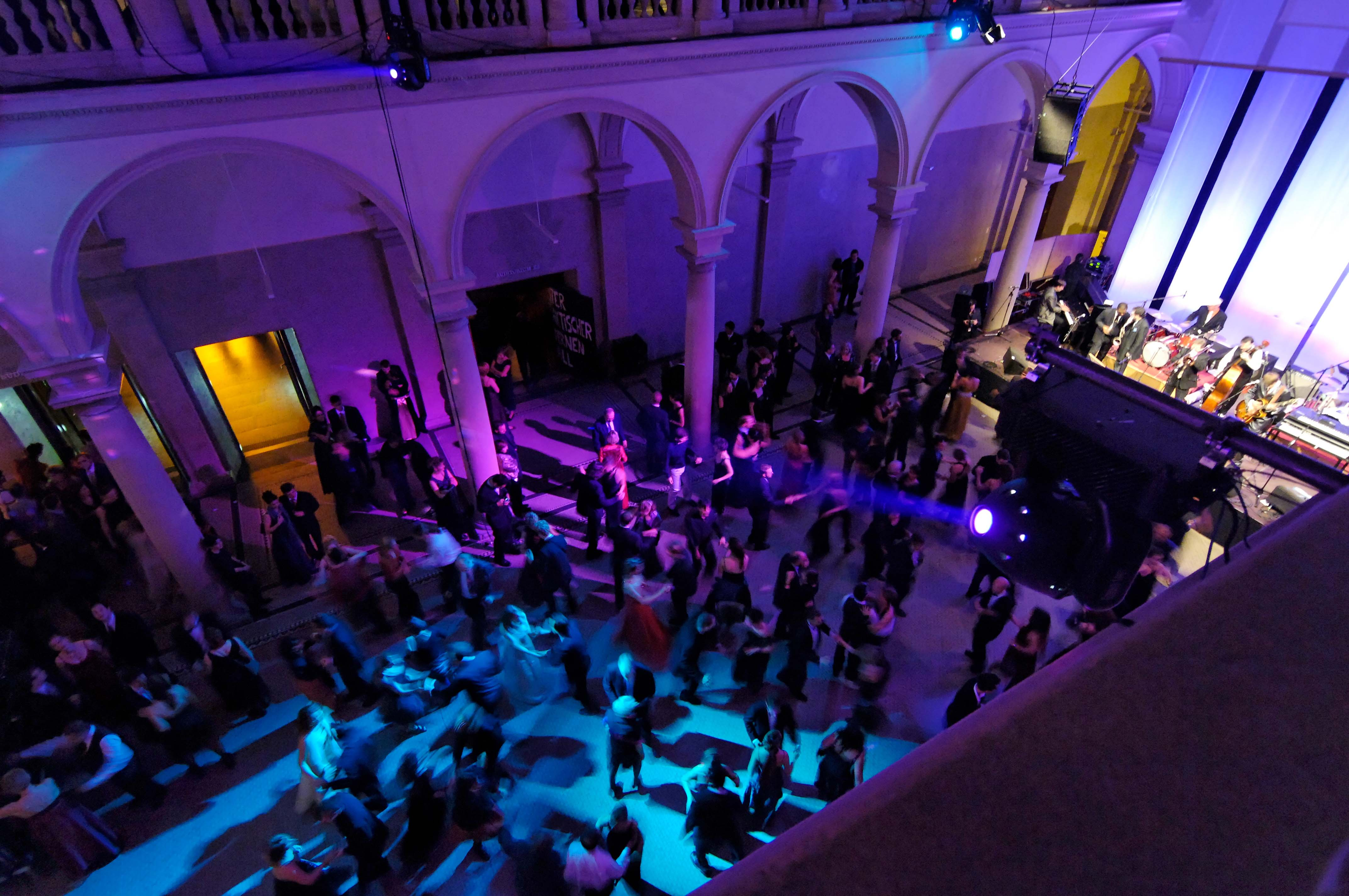
The ETH main hall during the Polyball (2005)

The Polyball is the most prestigious public event of the ETH Zurich. It has a long tradition since the 1880s and takes place annually at the end of November. The Polyball is the biggest decorated ball in Europe with approximately 9000 visitors and is a classic dance event.

== History ==
The exact year and the location of the first Polyball - then known as Akademie - is unknown. A general assumption is that the first ball took place in 1880. In 1929, the name changed from Akademie to Polyball. Since the 1940s each Polyball has its one theme with respective decorations of the ballrooms. Since its beginning in the Stadttheater Zürich (municipal theatre, now Zürich Opera House) the location has changed several times, such as Tonhalle Zürich, Grand Hotel Dolder, Zürcher Messegelände (Zürich fair areal) as well as the ETH main building, where it takes place today.

== The ball ==
The Polyball takes place within the main building of the ETH including the multifunctional hall. It starts at 19:00 on the last Saturday in November and ends at 05:00 on Sunday morning. The ball comprises 16 to 20 ballrooms decorated according to the ball theme. A variety of bands, from street performer to ballroom orchestra, entertain the dancers.

== Organisation ==
The Polyball is organized by the KOSTA foundation. It is an officially approved organisation of the VSETH and the University of Zurich (UZH) student societies. Students and former students of ETH, UZH and other colleges form the functional body of KOSTA. The planning and preparation of the ball takes place throughout the year. The decorations are created within 4 weeks in November by numerous students who in return earn their tickets for the Polyball. The decoration includes the interior as well as the exterior of the ETH main building.

== List of themes ==
- 2026 - Confoederatio Polytechnica
- 2025 - Von der Muse geküsst
- 2024 – Zwischen Göttern und Menschen
- 2023 – Paillettes Illuminées
- 2022 – Tanz im Tal der Könige
- 2019 – Chasing Northern Lights
- 2018 – Eine Nacht wie im Märchen
- 2017 – A Rather British Night
- 2016 – PolybAll – A Light Year in a Night
- 2015 – Weltenbummler
- 2014 – Tanz der Elemente
- 2013 – New York Nights
- 2012 – Scheherazade – 1000 Geschichten und eine Nacht
- 2011 – Auf der Suche nach Eldorado
- 2010 – Night out in the *20’s
- 2009 – Une Merveille
- 2008 – Winterwelt
- 2007 – Mit Säbel und Sextant
- 2006 – Die Stadt
- 2005 – Sternenwerfer
- 2004 – Ball-alaika
- 2003 – Kitsch as Kitsch can
- 2002 – Roma – Baci Antichi
- 2001 – Feuerball
- 2000 – Tanz der Sinne
- 1999 – Latente Talente
- 1998 – Versunkene Welten
- 1997 – Le palais dance
- 1996 – Das Experiment
- 1995 – Bal des Arts
- 1994 – Ballo Magico
- 1993 – Bal des Jeux
- 1992 – Metropolys
- 1991 – Time Machine
- 1990 – CH 90
- 1989 – Spaceball
- 1988 – Shakesbier
- 1987 – Vulcano Forte
- 1986 – Globetrotter
- 1985 – Polywood
- 1984 – Märliball
- 1983 – Polympia
- 1982 – Polyairball
- 1981 – Aquarius
- 1980 – Traumhochzeit hoch drei
- 1979 – Hannibal
- 1978 – Ali Baba
- 1977 – Goldrausch
- 1976 – Polyklinisches (cancelled)
- 1975 – Odyssee
- 1974 – Münchhausen
- 1973 – Walpurgisnacht
- 1972 – Gulliver
- 1971 – Contrast
- 1970 – Land in Sicht
- 1969 – Heureka
- 1968 – Time Out
- 1967 – Vivat Vamp
- 1966 – Arche Noah
- 1965 – Grieche sucht Griechin
- 1964 – Hans im Glück
- 1963 – Perpetuum mobile
- 1962 – Mit Lackschuh und Zylinder
- 1961 – Fata Morgana
- 1960 – Farbe!
- 1959 – Unterm Dach juhee
- 1958 – Latente magica
- 1957 – *1953 unknown
- 1952 – Spinnen am Abend
- 1951 – Polyball – Zauberball
- 1950 – *1949 unknown
- 1948 – Katzenjammer
- 1947 – Waldburgisnacht
- 1946 – Seid fröhlich, denn die Fröhlicheit schmückt Feste
- 1945 – Dämonenspuck
- 1944 – Aquarium
- 1943 – Fröhliche Wissenschaft
- 1942 – Skorpion
