= Federal Office for Housing =

Swiss government agency

- (in German) Bundesamt für Wohnungswesen, BWO (in French) Office fédéral du logement, OFL (in Italian) Ufficio federale delle abitazioni, UFAB

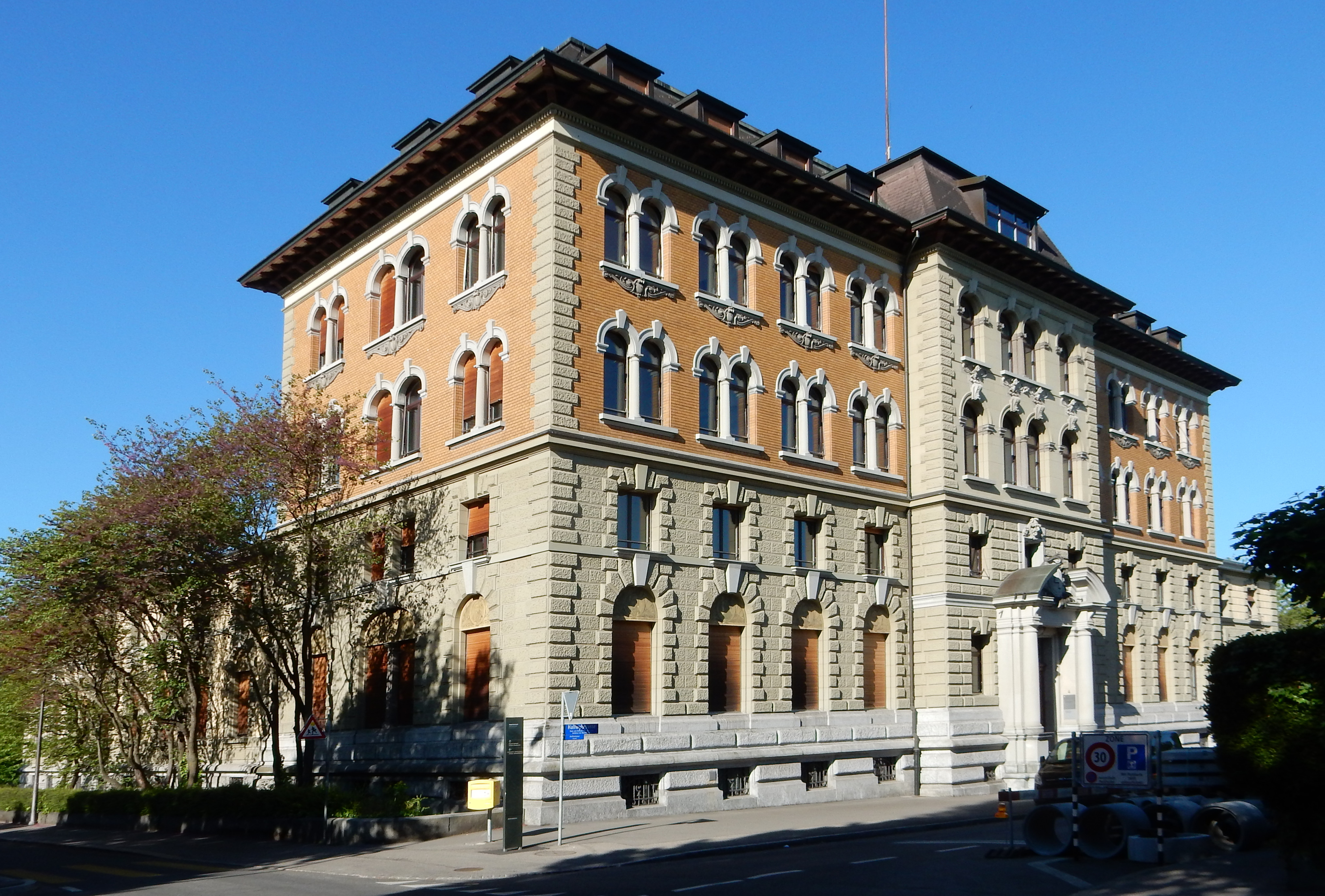
- The Federal Office for Housing, located at Hallwylstrasse 4 in Bern

Agency overview
- Jurisdiction: Federal administration of Switzerland
- Headquarters: Bern
- Minister responsible: Guy Parmelin, Federal Councillor
- Parent agency: Federal Department of Economic Affairs, Education and Research
- Website: bwo.admin.ch

The Federal Office for Housing (FOH) (Note: German: Bundesamt für Wohnungswesen, French: Office fédéral du logement, Italian: Ufficio federale delle abitazioni) is the Swiss federal office responsible for housing policy

The FOH is subordinated to the Federal Department of Economic Affairs, Education and Research, and is based in Bern. From 1995 to 2021 it was located in Grenchen.

The BWO is responsible for the enforcement of federal laws in the area of housing promotion and tenancy law. It develops decision-making bases for improving the supply of housing and the living environment as well as transparency in the housing market.

== Full-time positions since 2001 ==
Raw data

"Federal Finance Administration FFA: State financial statements".
"Federal Finance Administration FFA: Data portal".
