= Federal Office for Civilian Service =

Swiss government agency

- (in German) Bundesamt für Zivildienst (in French) Office fédéral du service civil (in Italian) Ufficio federale del servizio civile

Agency overview
- Formed: 1996 (as Executing Body); 2019 (as Federal Office)
- Jurisdiction: Federal administration of Switzerland
- Headquarters: Thun
- Employees: ~140
- Minister responsible: Guy Parmelin, Federal Councillor
- Parent agency: Federal Department of Economic Affairs, Education and Research
- Website: zivi.admin.ch

The Federal Office for Civilian Service (CIVI) (Note: German: Bundesamt für Zivildienst, ZIVI, French: Office fédéral du service civil, CIVI, Italian: Ufficio federale del servizio civile, CIVI) is the Swiss federal authority responsible for all matters regarding civilian service. It manages the admission of conscripts, the organization of assignments, and ensures the economic utility of the service.

The CIVI is subordinated to the Federal Department of Economic Affairs, Education and Research (EAER).

== Tasks and organisation ==
The CIVI primarily operates in three areas: deciding on admissions to civilian service, supervising and controlling conscripts during their service, and overseeing recognized deployment establishments (including the recognition of new ones).

The office employs approximately 140 people. While the central body is located in Thun, the office maintains regional centers in Aarau, Bellinzona, Lausanne, and Rüti, as well as a training center at the Schwarzsee.

== History ==
In Switzerland, popular initiatives to introduce a substitute civilian service were rejected by voters in 1977 and 1984. On May 17, 1992, 82.5% of voters approved a constitutional amendment allowing for substitute service for those with a conscientious objection to military service.

The Law on Civilian Service entered into force on October 1, 1996. Originally, admission required a personal hearing to demonstrate a conflict of conscience. Since April 1, 2009, a "proof by deed" system applies, where the willingness to perform civilian service that lasts 1.5 times longer than military service is considered sufficient proof of a conflict of conscience.

Originally managed by the Civilian Service Executing Body, the agency was elevated as a federal office in 2019.

== Full-time positions since 2007 ==
Raw data

Source: "Federal Finance Administration FFA: Data portal".

== See also ==
- Conscientious objection in Switzerland
