= Adolf Deucher =

Swiss politician (1831–1912)

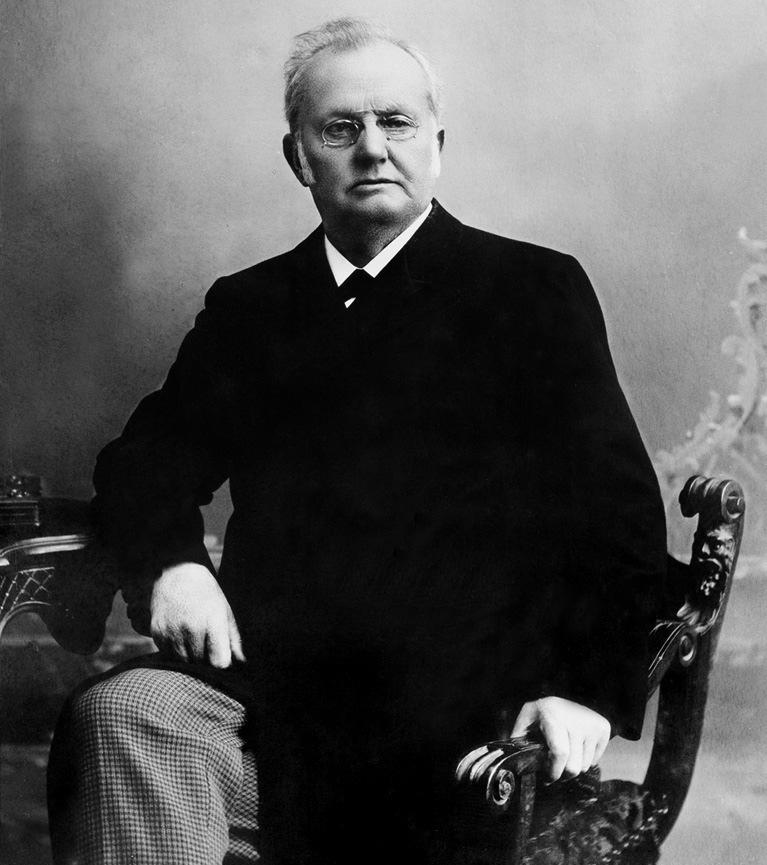
- Deucher in 1885

President of Switzerland
- In office 1 January 1909 – 31 December 1909
- Preceded by: Ernst Brenner
- Succeeded by: Robert Comtesse
- In office 1 January 1903 – 31 December 1903
- Preceded by: Josef Zemp
- Succeeded by: Robert Comtesse
- In office 1 January 1897 – 31 December 1897
- Preceded by: Adrien Lachenal
- Succeeded by: Eugène Ruffy
- In office 1 January 1886 – 31 December 1886
- Preceded by: Karl Schenk
- Succeeded by: Numa Droz

Swiss Federal Councillor
- In office 10 April 1883 – 10 July 1912
- Preceded by: Simeon Bavier
- Succeeded by: Edmund Schulthess

Personal details
- Born: 15 February 1831 Wipkingen, Zurich, Switzerland
- Died: 10 July 1912 (aged 81) Bern, Switzerland
- Party: Democratic Left

Adolf Deucher (15 February 1831 – 10 July 1912) was a Swiss politician who served as a federal councillor from 1883 to 1912, and a two-time member of the Swiss National Council. Pursuing centralist policies in a very federalist country, he was a main promoter of the 1868 revision of the Swiss constitution.

As a federal councillor, he improved conditions for workers (banning phosphorus in the match industry in 1898, revision of the factory law). He was also the guiding force behind the first national law on agriculture.

== Early career ==
He studied medicine at Heidelberg, Zurich, Prague, and Vienna. In 1855 he became a member of the Grand Council of Thurgau, and in 1868 he served as a member of the council established to formulate a new democratic constitution for Thurgau. From 1869 to 1873 he was a member of the National Council of Switzerland, and, three years after his re-election to that body became its president (1882).

== Later career ==
He was elected to the Swiss Federal Council on 10 April 1883 and died in office on 10 July 1912, aged 81. He was affiliated with the Democratic Left, which later developed into the Social-Political Group. During his office time, he held the following departments:

- Department of Justice and Police (1883)
- Department of Posts and Railways (1884)
- Department of Home Affairs (1885)
- Political Department (1886)
- Department of Trade and Agriculture (1887)
- Department of Industry and Agriculture (1888–1895)
- Department of Trade, Industry and Agriculture (1896)
- Political Department (1897)
- Department of Trade, Industry and Agriculture (1898–1902)
- Political Department (1903)
- Department of Trade, Industry and Agriculture (1904–1908)
- Political Department (1909)
- Department of Trade, Industry and Agriculture (1910–1912)

He was President of the Confederation four times in 1886, 1897, 1903 and 1909.

Political offices
Preceded by Karl Zyro	President of the National Council; 1882/1883	Succeeded by Simon Kaiser
Preceded by Simeon Bavier	Member of the Swiss Federal Council; 1883–1912	Succeeded by Edmund Schulthess
