= Swiss Federal University for Vocational Education and Training =

Swiss educational institution sponsored by the federal government

Swiss Federal University for Vocational Education and Training (SFUVET)
- Eidgenössische Hochschule für Berufsbildung (EHB) Haute école fédérale en formation professionnelle (HEFP) Scuola universitaria federale per la formazione professionale (SUFFP)
- Former name: Swiss Institute for Vocational Education
- Motto: Swiss excellence in vocational training
- Established: 1972; 54 years ago
- Budget: CHF 42.2 million
- President: SFIVET Council: Adrian Wüthrich; University Management: Barbara Fontanellaz
- Administrative staff: 226 (176 full-time positions)
- Students: 1840 (2019), plus around 11,500 further training courses
- Location: Zollikofen (Headquarters); Renens; Lugano, Switzerland
- Website: https://www.sfuvet.swiss/

The Swiss Federal University for Vocational Education and Training (SFUVET), previously the Swiss Federal Institute for Vocational Education and Training (SFIVET), is the central Swiss educational institution for vocational education and training. It functions under the auspices of the Confederation.

The SFUVET emerged from the Swiss Pedagogical Institute for Vocational Education (SPIVE), which was founded in 1972. Its tasks include the training and education of VET professionals, research into VET, the further development of professions, and support for international cooperation in VET. The institution has offices in Zollikofen, near Bern (headquarters), Lausanne, and Lugano, with additional sites in Olten and Zürich.

== University status ==
The Federal Act on the Swiss Federal Institute for Vocational Education and Training (SFUVET Act) of September 25, 2020 upgraded SFUVET to a university. The Federal Council passed the Act on June 18, 2021, which became effective on August 1, 2021. This also changed the formal name of the institution to the current one.

== Tasks ==
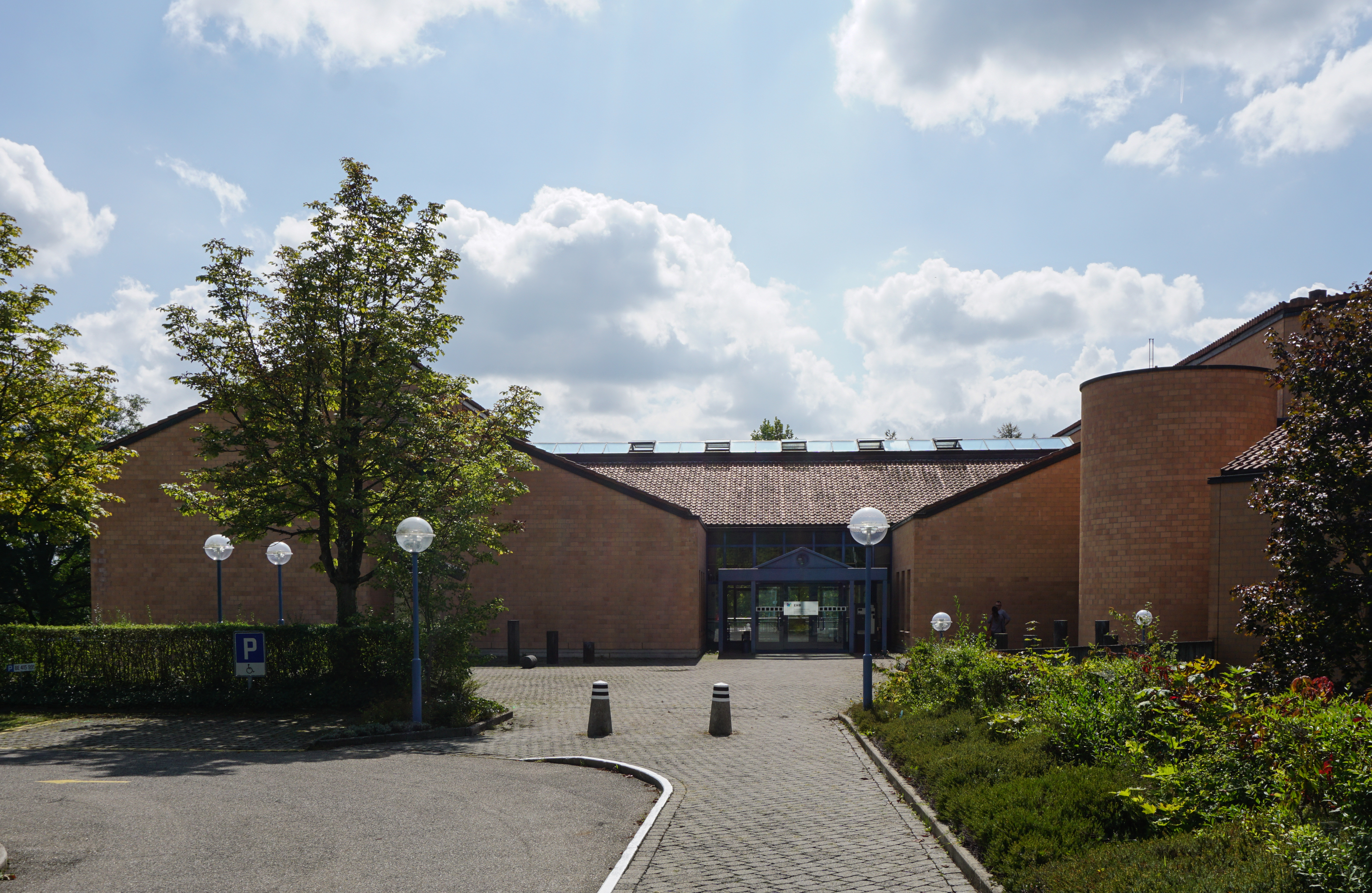
SFUVET site in Zollikofen

The Swiss Federal University for Vocational Education and Training provides services in the following areas:

- Training of vocational training managers;
- Further training for vocational training managers;
- Research and development in vocational training;
- Professional development.

SFUVET also carries out various tasks and research activities on behalf of the State Secretariat for Education, Research, and Innovation SERI. The agency actively supports projects related to digitalization and e-learning strategies. SFUVET is particularly involved in initiatives to enhance teaching staff's digital skills.

SFUVET has led various projects funded by the Swiss National Science Foundation (SNSF) and recently carried out the "At the heart of vocational training" project in the form of an interactive exhibition presented at various career and training fairs in French-speaking Switzerland.

The university follows the principle of “practice in the service of practice”, emphasizing a continuous connection to professional practice across all service areas.

The SFUVET holds a unique position as the sole educational institution in Switzerland with a mandate spanning four locations across three language regions. This distinctive reach ensures a standardized implementation of federal requirements. Serving as a crucial link between professional organizations, the 26 cantons, and numerous vocational schools and colleges, SFUVET plays an essential role as a national institution. It acts as a central point of contact for inquiries related to development projects and the education and training of vocational education and training (VET) professionals. The university has a network of partnerships with national and international partners in business and science. Their expertise in vocational education and training is in high demand globally for international projects, educational programs, conferences, and delegations.

The federal government is the owner of SFUVET. Like ETH Zurich, for example, SFUVET is affiliated with the Federal Department of Economic Affairs, Education and Research (EAER).

Art. 48 paragraph 2 of the Federal Act of 13 December 2002 on Vocational and Professional Education and Training (VPETA) stipulates that the Confederation manages the Institute at the university level and sets corresponding objectives.

In 2016, an assessment was conducted to determine the constitutional requirements for the legal basis and integration of SFUVET into Swiss higher education, as well as the need for an accreditation requirement. Consequently, the Federal Act on the Swiss Federal Institute for Vocational Education and Training (SFUVET Act), was developed to provide a legal foundation for SFUVET. SFUVET aimed to be accredited as a university of teacher education, and an application for accreditation was submitted to the Swiss Accreditation Council at the end of 2019. Accreditation was granted in the autumn of 2022.

== University management ==
=== SFUVET Council ===
The SFUVET Council serves as the strategic management body of SFUVET, consisting of nine members elected by the Federal Council. This council plays a pivotal role in shaping the strategic objectives for SFUVET's development, operating within the framework of its performance mandate. The Council's primary responsibilities include ensuring the fulfillment of the performance mandate and adherence to the budget. Adrian Wüthrich has held the position of President since 1 March 2020.

=== University management ===
The Executive Board of SFUVET is composed of the Director and the five national heads of division. Within the framework of the SFUVET Council's strategy, the Executive Board determines the objectives and organization of the University's education, continuing education, research, and development. The Director is held responsible by the SFUVET Council for the operational management of SFUVET and represents SFUVET externally. Barbara Fontanellaz has held the position of Director of SFUVET since March 1, 2020.

== The divisions of the SFUVET ==
=== Training ===
The Training division of SFUVET focuses on the core task of training both full-time and part-time teachers at various educational institutions, including vocational schools, commercial colleges, vocational baccalaureate schools, and higher-education technical colleges. Additionally, the division provides study programs tailored for vocational trainers, conducting these programs in inter-company courses, training workshops, and other locations conducive to professional practice. In the Fall of 2007, the division launched a unique academic qualification for university graduates throughout Switzerland: the Master of Science (MSc) in Vocational Education and Training.

With a total of 26 study programs recognized by the State Secretariat for Education, Research, and Innovation (SERI), SFUVET annually trains over 1700 teachers and vocational trainers in the three language regions of Switzerland.

The following degrees are offered:

- Diploma and certificate for vocational school teachers for vocational teaching;
- Diploma for vocational school teachers in basic commercial training and retail trade;
- Diploma for vocational school teachers for general education teaching;
- Diploma for lecturers at Universities of Applied Sciences;
- Diploma for teachers in the vocational baccalaureate program;
- Certificate for vocational trainers in inter-company courses and comparable third-learning venues;
- Certificate for vocational teachers;
- Certificate for teachers with a grammar school teaching qualification;
- EHB/SVEB/teaching diplomas;
- Bachelor of Science in Vocational Education and Training;
- Master of Science in Vocational Education and Training.

=== Continuing education ===
The tasks of the Continuing Education division include offering centralized courses aimed at enhancing the professional development of vocational education and training (VET) professionals. Additionally, the division develops and provides courses to foster growth and development of VET organizations, for development of VET managers, and to promote quality and innovation in VET.

To fulfill this mission, the range of services offered by the Continuing Education division includes:

- Further training courses;
- Continuing education courses with ECTS credits and certificate/diploma/Master's degree (CAS-DAS-MAS);
- Tailor-made, needs-oriented services and courses on-site or at SFUVET;
- Functional and development analyses in institutions;
- Introductory and job-specific courses for examination experts.

=== Research and development ===
The Research and Development (R&D) division develops the basis for various training courses, including initial and further education. This includes evaluations, efficiency tests, and projects related to skills assessment. These form the foundation for the future of vocational education and training.

The R&D division of SFUVET defines key VET topics and goals. The R&D staff investigate questions that can provide answers to the current challenges of VET practice. The knowledge gained from the research flows into teaching at SFUVET, and thus back into practice. Beneficiaries of the R&D division's work include students, VET teachers, and work and education policy organizations.

SFUVET's research activities are organized into three thematic research focuses, each with three research fields. The Swiss Observatory for Vocational Education and Training and the Evaluation Centre complement the R&D division's services.

The three main areas of research and development at SFUVET are:

- Teaching and learning in vocational training;
- Integration into vocational training and the labor market;
- Control of vocational training.

=== Centre for Professional Development ===
The Centre for Vocational Development supports basic and advanced vocational education and training. It offers services in occupational analysis and professional development, including describing necessary skills, defining educational objectives, organizing and scheduling training, and defining qualification procedures.

The Centre advises, monitors, and supports organizations in the workforce. It sponsors basic and higher vocational education and training throughout the stages of their professions. The Centre offers practice-oriented services to address the needs of workforce organizations or sponsors. Additionally, the Centre promotes professional competency across all learning venues.

== Magazine skilled ==
SFUVET has published Skilled magazine biannually since 2017. The publication showcases current trends in vocational education and training both in Switzerland and abroad. Through the magazine, SFUVET's goal is to facilitate the exchange of information and knowledge, as well as foster networking among all stakeholders in the field of vocational education and training.

== History of the institute ==
=== From SPIVE to SFUVET (1972–2007) ===
The Swiss Federal University for Vocational Education and Training (SFUVET) emerged from the Swiss Pedagogical Institute for Vocational Education (SPIVE), which was founded in Zollikofen in 1972. In 1975, a second location was opened in Lausanne for French-speaking Switzerland, and in 1991 a third location was opened in Lugano for Italian-speaking Switzerland.

The primary responsibilities of the SPIVE focused on the training and continuous education of teachers in the commercial and industrial sectors. This included both full-time and part-time teachers at vocational schools, as well as teachers with special functions in school management, practical counseling, or mediation.

The SPIVE collaborated with cantons and professional associations to conduct courses for instructors of master teacher and examination expert courses. The SPIVE executed research and development projects in vocational education and training, as well as created expert reports and studies.

In 2001, the Federal Office for Professional Education and Technology, now known as SERI (State Secretariat for Education, Research, and Innovation), tasked the SPIVE with training teachers in the commercial sector and educating experts in qualification procedures for basic vocational education.

On January 1, 2007, the SPIVE underwent a transformation and officially became the Swiss Federal Institute for Vocational Education and Training (SFIVET). This change was prompted by two significant reforms in the Swiss education system: the tertiarization of teacher training and reforms in vocational education and training. With these two reforms and the newly assigned tasks and competencies, the structures and organization of the Institute were also adapted and the services were re-positioned throughout Switzerland.

On August 1, 2021, the Swiss Federal Institute for Vocational Education and Training (SFIVET) was renamed the Swiss Federal University for Vocational Education and Training (SFUVET). This change was based on the implementation of the SFUVET Act in the same year.

In the following year, the institutional accreditation to SFUVET as a university of teacher education (which began in 2019) was granted.
