= Federal Office for National Economic Supply =

Swiss government agency

- (in German) Bundesamt für wirtschaftliche Landesversorgung, BWL (in French) Office fédéral pour l'approvisionnement économique du pays, OFAE (in Italian) Ufficio federale dell’approvvigionamento economico, UFAE

Agency overview
- Jurisdiction: Federal administration of Switzerland
- Headquarters: Bern
- Minister responsible: Guy Parmelin, Federal Councillor
- Parent agency: Federal Department of Economic Affairs, Education and Research
- Website: wbf.admin.ch

The Federal Office for National Economic Supply (FONES) (Note: German: Bundesamt für wirtschaftliche Landesversorgung, French: Office fédéral pour l'approvisionnement économique du pays, Italian: Ufficio federale dell’approvvigionamento economico) is the Swiss federal office responsible for national economic supply, working with the private sector to alleviate the effects of short-term shortages, notably by supervising compulsory stockpiling.

The FONES is subordinated to the Federal Department of Economic Affairs, Education and Research.

== Legal basis ==
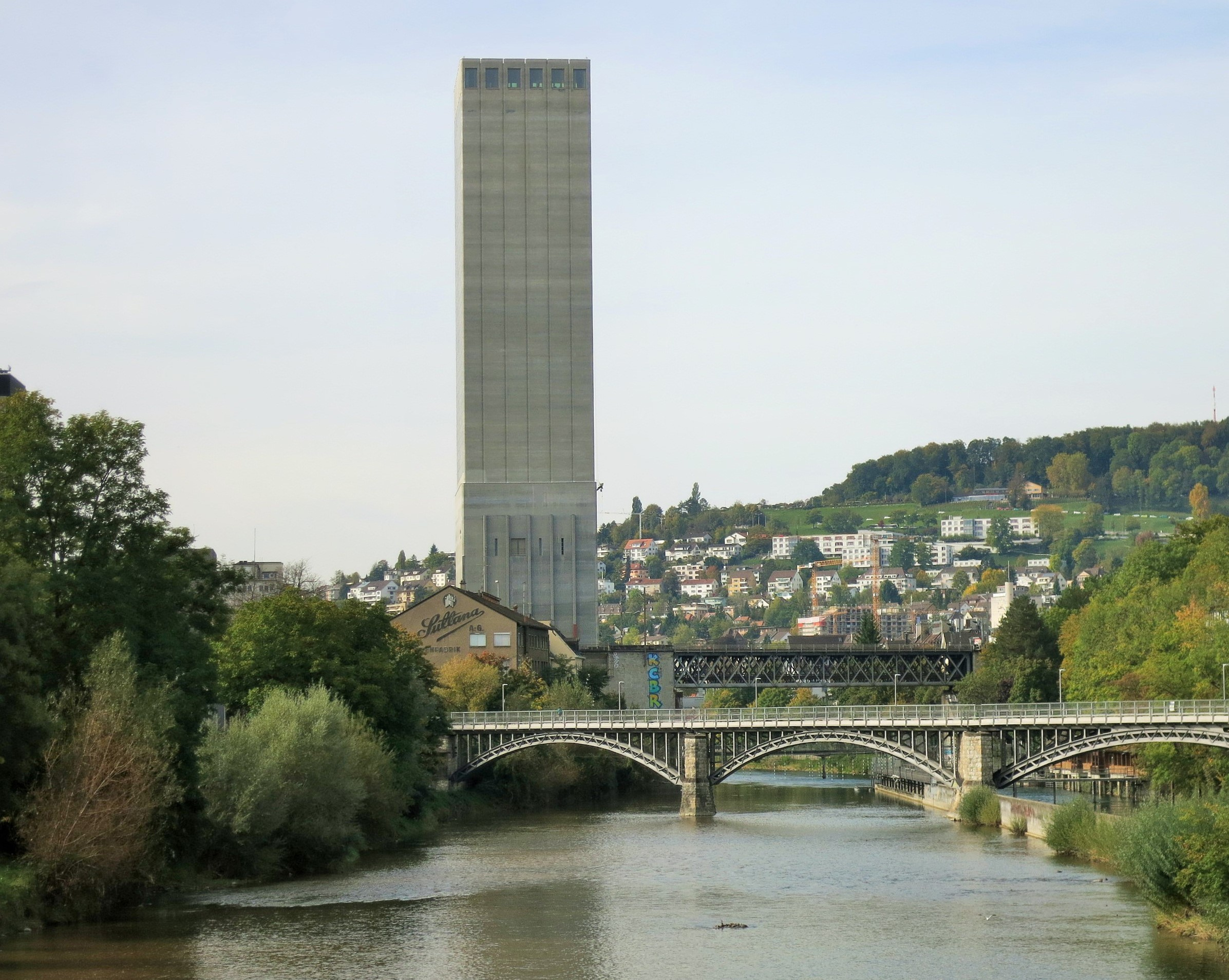
Silo storing grain in Zurich

The Swiss Constitution states:

The Confederation shall ensure that the country is supplied with essential goods and services in the event of the threat of politico-military strife or war, or of severe shortages that the economy cannot by itself counteract. It shall take precautionary measures to address these matters. In exercising its powers under this Article, it may if necessary depart from the principle of economic freedom.

— Swiss constitution, Art. 102 National economic supply

This provision is specified in the National Economic Supply Act.

== Means ==
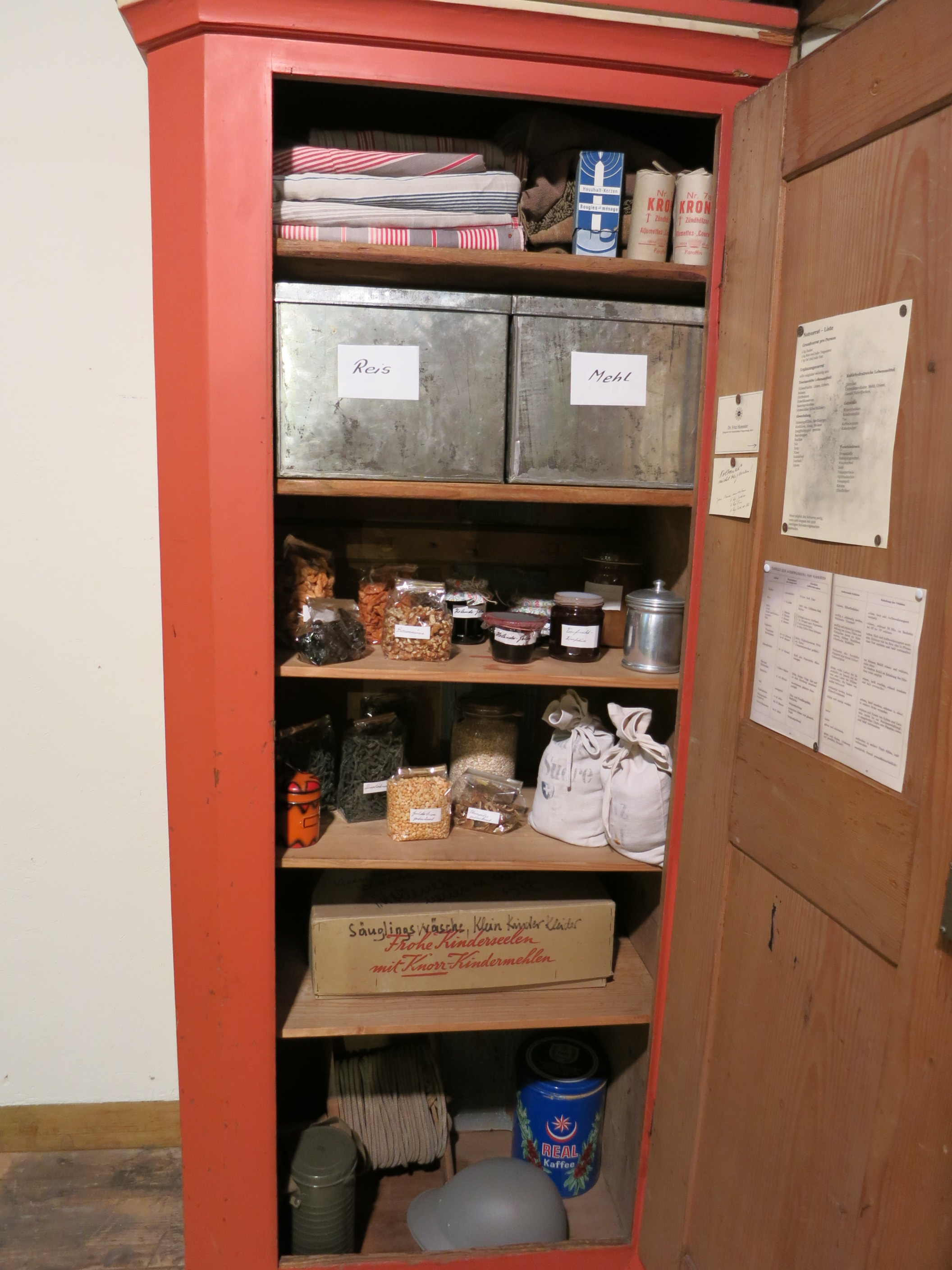
Emergency home reserves

The office imposes the stockpiling by about 300 concerned companies ("compulsory stockpiling" for a three to four month autonomy) of vital goods, such as food, medicines, oil or fertilisers. It can impose restrictions on consumption (rationing).

Since 1968, the office publishes a brochure providing advice to the population on emergency supplies. The office advises the population to store a week's worth of food and drinking water (as well as a few useful items such as a torch and hygiene items) in the household. In the 1990s, the recommendation was for a fortnight.

== Pandemics ==
In 2007, faced with the risk of an avian flu (H5N1) pandemic, the Federal Office of Public Health recommended that the population stockpiles fifty hygiene masks per person (to avoid a stockout in the event of a pandemic). The Confederation had set aside a reserve of one antiviral drug. The current "Swiss Influenza Pandemic Plan" (2018) still recommends that the population should have fifty hygiene masks per person as emergency household supplies.

In 2015–2016, a FONES survey of the cantons concluded that "the [mask] reserves in case of a pandemic are insufficient". In 2019, the FONES's "Strategic Stockpile Report 2019" states that in the event of a crisis due to the emergence of a new pathogen, the demand for masks would explode. However, it states that the mandatory stockpiling of hygiene masks and medical examination gloves has been removed. The report recommends maintaining stockpiles at 170,000 FFP masks, while noting that during the first 12 weeks of a pandemic wave, 750,000 protective masks would be needed.

In 2020, during the coronavirus pandemic, the Federal Office for National Economic Supply reminds that it had identified 170,000 FFP protective masks in reserve in the country (mandatory reserves that were then purchased by the army and made available to the cantons). The army also had around 7 million hygiene masks (which can also be supplied to the cantons). At the end of March 2020, the office announced that it would release reserves of painkillers and antibiotics, which were beginning to run out in hospitals.

== Full-time positions since 2001 ==
Raw data

"Federal Finance Administration FFA: State financial statements".
"Federal Finance Administration FFA: Data portal".
