= Federal Department of Economic Affairs, Education and Research =

Swiss government department

- (in German) Eidgenössisches Departement für Wirtschaft, Bildung und Forschung (in French) Département fédéral de l'économie, de la formation et de la recherche (in Italian) Dipartimento federale dell'economia, della formazione e della ricerca (in Romansh) Departament federal d'economia, furmaziun e retschertga

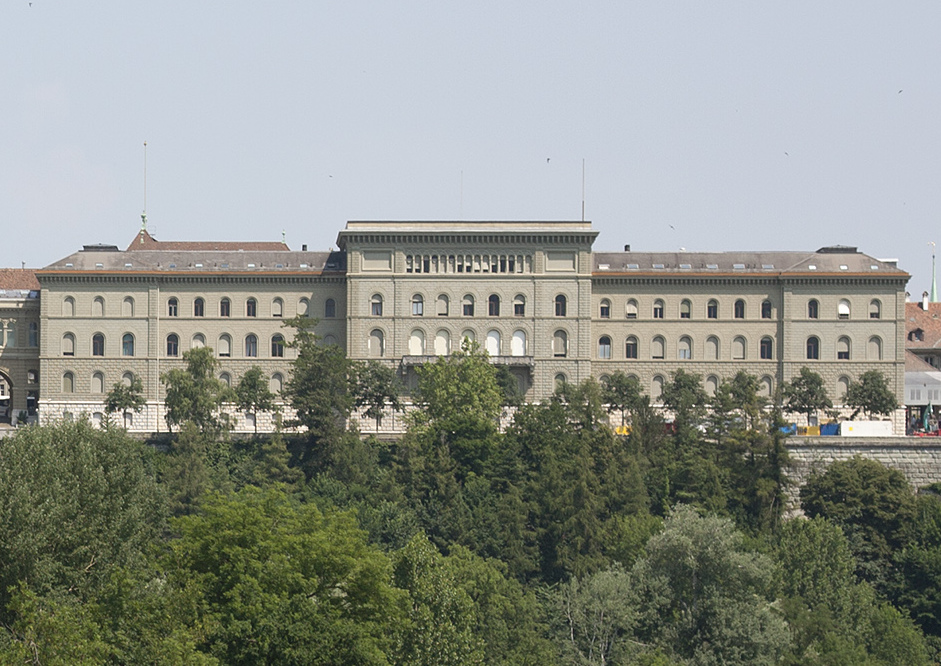
- The east wing of the Federal Palace of Switzerland

Agency overview
- Formed: 1848; 178 years ago
- Jurisdiction: Federal administration of Switzerland
- Headquarters: Federal Palace (east wing), Bern
- Employees: 1,919
- Annual budget: Expenditure: CHF 6.1 billion Revenue: CHF 271.8 million (2009)
- Minister responsible: Guy Parmelin, Federal Councillor
- Website: www.wbf.admin.ch

The Federal Department of Economic Affairs, Education and Research (EAER, German: Eidgenössisches Departement für Wirtschaft, Bildung und Forschung; French: Département fédéral de l'économie, de la formation et de la recherche; Italian: Dipartimento federale dell'economia, della formazione e della ricerca) is one of the seven departments of the federal government of Switzerland, headed by a member of the Swiss Federal Council.

The department was renamed from Federal Department of Economic Affairs (FDEA) effective on 1 January 2013 based on decisions taken by the Federal Council in 2011.

== Organisation ==
The department is composed of the following federal offices:

- Federal Office for Civilian Service (CIVI): Responsible for the civilian service
- State Secretariat for Economic Affairs (SECO): Responsible for national and international economic policy, trade negotiations and labour policy.
- State Secretariat for Education, Research and Innovation (SERI).
- Federal Office for Agriculture (FOAG): Responsible for agricultural policy, for direct payments to Swiss farmers, and for Agroscope, center of excellence for agricultural research.
- Federal Office for National Economic Supply (FONES): Manages emergency supplies of essential goods and services.
- Federal Office for Housing (FOH): Responsible for housing policy.

As well as the following agencies:

- Federal Consumer Affairs Bureau (FCAB)
- Price Supervision (PRS): Price ombudsman and responsible for the supervision of regulated prices.
- Information Service Center (WBF ISCeco)
- Competition Commission (COMCO), the Swiss competition regulator.
- Innosuisse - Swiss Innovation Agency
- Swiss Federal Institute for Vocational Education and Training (SFIVET): Provides training for vocational education professionals.
- ETH Board, which itself manages the ETH Domain, a group of technical universities and research institutes. These include the Swiss Federal Institute of Technology in Zurich (ETH Zurich), the Swiss Federal Institute of Technology in Lausanne (EPFL), the Paul Scherrer Institute in Villigen, the Federal Institute for Forest, Snow and Landscape Research in Birmensdorf, the Federal Laboratory for Materials Testing and Research and the Federal Institute for Environmental Science and Technology in Dübendorf.

=== Former offices ===
The Federal Veterinary office (FVO) was merged in 2014 into the Federal Office for Food Safety and Veterinary Affairs, subordinated to the Federal Department of Home Affairs. The FVO was responsible for animal welfare and health, the safety of food of animal origin and the implementation of the CITES convention.

== Names of the department ==
- 1848–1872: Department of Trade and Customs
- 1873–1878: Department of Railway and Trade
- 1879–1887: Department of Trade and Agriculture
- 1888–1895: Department of Industry and Agriculture
- 1896–1914: Department of Trade, Industry and Agriculture
- 1915–1978: Department of Economic Affairs
- 1979–2012: Federal Department of Economic Affairs
- 2013–present: Federal Department of Economic Affairs, Education and Research

== List of heads of the department ==
- 1848–1853: Friedrich Frey-Herosé
- 1854 only: Wilhelm Matthias Naeff
- 1855 only: Josef Munzinger
- 1855–1856: Constant Fornerod
- 1857 only: Melchior Josef Martin Knüsel
- 1858 only: Constant Fornerod
- 1859–1860: Melchior Josef Martin Knüsel
- 1861–1866: Friedrich Frey-Herosé
- 1867–1873: Wilhelm Matthias Naeff
- 1873–1874: Johann Jakob Scherer
- 1875–1877: Karl Schenk
- 1878 only: Joachim Heer
- 1879–1880: Numa Droz
- 1881 only: Louis Ruchonnet
- 1882–1886: Numa Droz
- 1887–1896: Adolf Deucher
- 1897 only: Adrien Lachenal
- 1898–1902: Adolf Deucher
- 1903 only: Ludwig Forrer
- 1904–1908: Adolf Deucher
- 1909 only: Josef Anton Schobinger
- 1910–1912: Adolf Deucher
- 1912–1934: Edmund Schulthess
- 1934–1940: Hermann Obrecht
- 1940–1947: Walther Stampfli
- 1948–1954: Rodolphe Rubattel
- 1955–1959: Thomas Holenstein
- 1960–1961: Friedrich Traugott Wahlen
- 1961–1969: Hans Schaffner
- 1970–1978: Ernst Brugger
- 1978–1982: Fritz Honegger
- 1983–1986: Kurt Furgler
- 1987–1998: Jean-Pascal Delamuraz
- 1998–2002: Pascal Couchepin
- 2003–2006: Joseph Deiss
- 2006–2010: Doris Leuthard
- 2010–2018: Johann Schneider-Ammann
- Since 2019: Guy Parmelin

== Full-time positions since 2001 ==
Raw data

"Federal Finance Administration FFA: State financial statements".
"Federal Finance Administration FFA: Data portal".

== See also ==
- Swiss University Conference
- Swiss Federal Institute for Vocational Education and Training
