= Joël Mesot =

Swiss physicist and academic

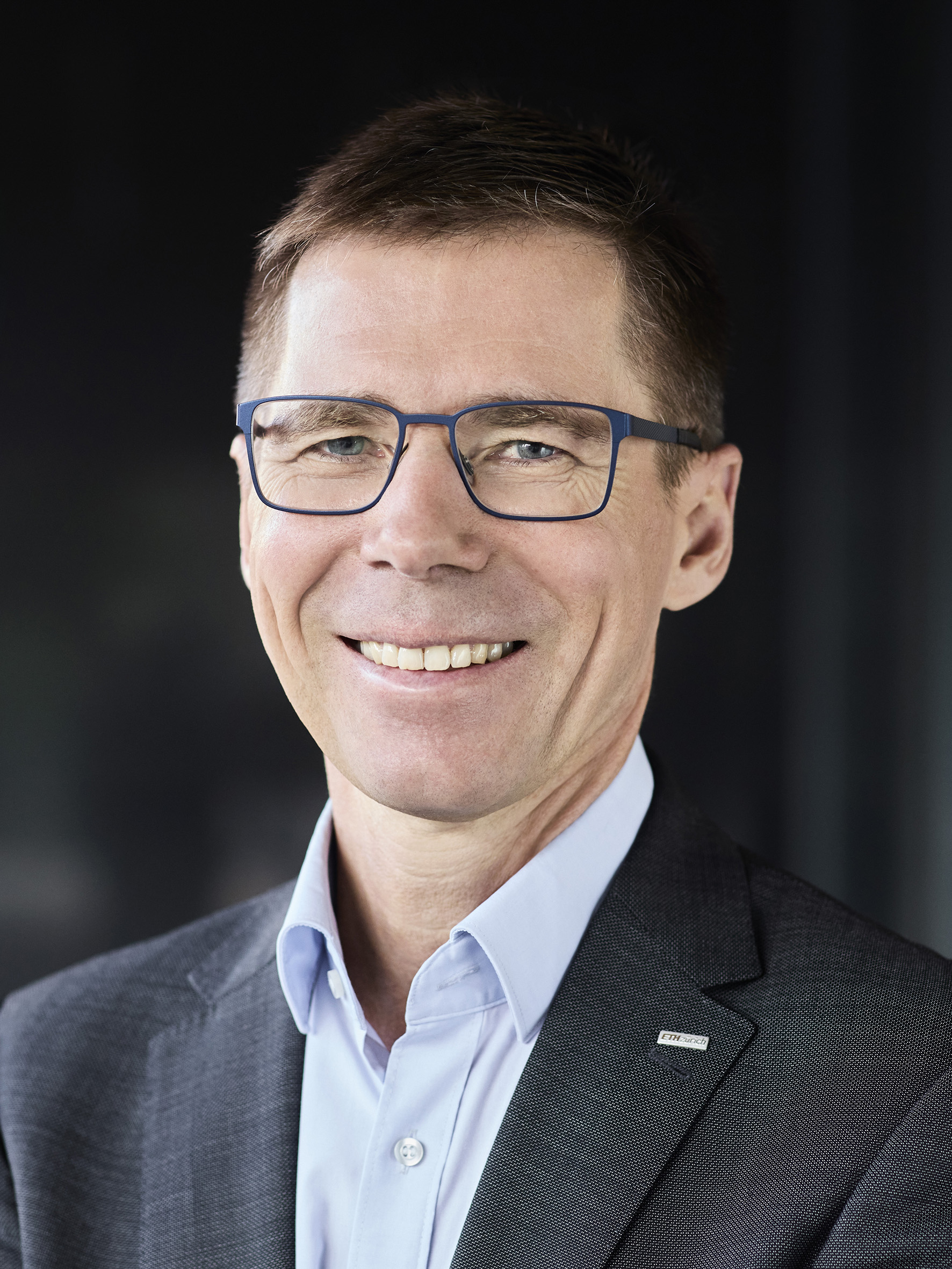
- Mesot in 2021
- Born: 31 August 1964 (age 61); Geneva, Switzerland
- Education: ETH Zurich (MSc, PhD)
- Known for: Angle-resolved photoemission spectroscopy
- Awards: IBM Prize Swiss Physical Society (1995); Latsis Prize ETH Zurich (2002)
- Scientific career
- Fields: physics
- Institutions: ETH Zurich; Institut Laue–Langevin; Argonne National Laboratory; Paul Scherrer Institute; EPF Lausanne
- Doctoral advisor: Albert Furrer

Joël François Mesot (born 31 August 1964) is a Swiss physicist and academic. He is currently the President of the Swiss Federal Institute of Technology in Zurich, also known as ETH Zurich.

== Biography ==
Mesot was born in Geneva, Switzerland, where he grew up. He studied physics at the ETH Zurich from 1984 to 1989, followed by doctoral studies at the same university as well as at the Institut Laue-Langevin, Grenoble in France. In 1992, he was awarded a PhD in physics (Dr. sc. nat.) from the ETH Zurich with a thesis on high-temperature superconductors supervised by Albert Furrer. Thereafter he joined the Paul Scherrer Institute (PSI) as a researcher in the field of neutron scattering. He continued his research at the Argonne National Laboratory in Chicago to perform angle-resolved photoemission spectroscopy (ARPES) experiments. In 1999, he returned to the PSI, where he was responsible for the laboratory investigating neutron scattering. He became chair of the PSI Research Commission in 2007. In August 2008, he was promoted to head the entire operations at PSI as its director. At the same time, he was named full professor at the ETH Zurich as well as at the EPF Lausanne. He is a member of the ETH Board, also known as the Board of the Swiss Federal Institutes of Technology, since 2010. Mesot is a trustee of the Marcel Benoist Prize committee. Since January 2019, he is President of the ETH Zurich and, in 2022, was confirmed for a second term by the Swiss Federal Council (2023–2026). Mesot is the first President of the ETH Zurich coming from the French speaking part of Switzerland. He is fluent in French, German and English.

Mesot is vice chair of the board of trustees at the ETH Foundation. As president of the ETH Zurich, he is a member of Swissuniversities and the Swiss Innovation Park. In addition, he is part of international boards, such as the Governing Board of the Campus for Research Excellence and Technological Enterprise (CREATE) in Singapore.

Mesot is a member of the Executive Advisory Board of the World.Minds Foundation.

== Impact on ETH Zurich ==
As president, Mesot, alongside the other seven executive board members, is responsible for all legal and political matters of the ETH Zurich.

Mesot established "rETHink" as a means to improve the university from an organisational point of view. Furthermore, he strengthened the bonds between the ETH Zurich and the French-speaking part of Switzerland, for example by establishing a shared master programme "cyber security" of the ETH Zurich and its sister school the EPF Lausanne. Under his leadership, the new ETH AI Center and Centre for the Origin and Prevalence of Life (COPL) were established in 2020 and 2022, respectively. In collaboration with the Dieter Schwarz Foundation, an additional research center in Heilbronn and the establishment of 20 new professorships over the coming 30 years is planned.

In 2023, Mesot established the "Coalition for Green Energy and Storage", a partnership between ETH Zurich, EPFL, and Swiss businesses to establish and produce new environment-friendly technologies.

== Awards ==
- 1995: IBM prize of the Swiss Physical Society (SPG) for Outstanding Work in Neutron Spectroscopic Studies of the Crystal Field in High-Tc Superconductors.
- 2002: Latsis prize of the ETH Zurich for his outstanding contribution to the investigation of high-temperature superconductors by neutron scattering and angle resolved photoemission spectroscopy.

== Publications (Selection) ==
Mesot is author of over 250 published works and a book on strongly correlated materials.

- J. Mesot et al.: Neutron Spectroscopic Evidence for Cluster Formation and Percolative Superconductivity in ErBa2Cu3Ox. In: PRL 70 (1993), S. 865.
- J. C. Campuzano, J. Mesot, et al.: Electronic spectra and their relation to the (pi,pi) collective mode in high-T-c superconductors. In: PRL 83 (1999), S. 3709.
- J. Mesot, et al.: . In: . Band 83, Nr. 4, 26. Juli 1999, S. 840–843, doi:10.1103/PhysRevLett.83.840.
- A. Furrer, J. Mesot, T. Strässle: . In: . Band 04. World Scientific, 2009, ISBN 978-981-02-4830-7, doi:10.1142/4870.
- J. Chang, J. Mesot, et al.: . In: . Band 8, Nr. 12, Dezember 2012, S. 871–876, doi:10.1038/nphys2456.
- B. Q. Lv, J. Mesot, et al.: . In: . Band 11, Nr. 9, September 2015, S. 724–727, doi:10.1038/nphys3426.
- J. Mesot: . In: Ana Mari Cauce, Yves Flückiger, Bert van der Zwaan (Hrsg.): . Association Glion Colloquium, Geneva 2022, ISBN 978-2-940723-11-9, S. 175–186.
