= Archives of Microbiology =

- Discipline: Microbiology
- Language: English
- Edited by: Yusuf Akhtar

Publication details
- Former name: Archiv für Mikrobiologie
- History: 1930–present
- Publisher: Springer Berlin Heidelberg (Germany)
- Frequency: 10/year
- Open access: Hybrid
- Impact factor: 3.4 (2025)

Standard abbreviations
- ISO 4: Arch. Microbiol.

Indexing
- CODEN: AMICCW
- ISSN: 0302-8933 (print); 1432-072X (web)
- LCCN: 74642625
- OCLC no.: 2239811

Links
- Journal homepage; Online access

Archives of Microbiology (formerly Archiv für Mikrobiologie ISSN 0003-9276) is a peer-reviewed scientific journal of microbiology established in 1930. It is edited by Yusuf Akhter, and published by Springer Berlin Heidelberg ten times per year.

== Abstracting and indexing ==
According to the Journal Citation Reports, the journal has a 2025 impact factor of 3.4. The journal is abstracted and indexing in the following databases:

- Academic OneFile
- Academic Search
- AGRICOLA
- Aquatic Sciences and Fisheries Abstracts
- Biological Abstracts
- BIOSIS
- CAB Abstracts
- CAB International
- Chemical Abstracts Service
- ChemWeb
- CSA
- CSA Environmental Sciences
- Current Contents/Life Sciences
- EBSCO
- Elsevier Biobase
- EMBASE
- EMBiology
- Environment Index
- Food Science and Technology Abstracts
- Gale
- GeoRef
- Global Health
- Health Reference Center Academic
- INIS Atomindex
- International Bibliography of Book Reviews
- International Bibliography of Periodical Literature
- Journal Citation Reports/Science Edition
- PubMed/Medline
- ReadCube
- Referativnyi Zhurnal (VINITI)
- SCImago
- Science Citation Index
- Science Citation Index Expanded (SciSearch)
- SCOPUS
- Summon by ProQuest
- Vitis - Viticulture and Enology Abstracts
