= ETH Board =

The Board of the Swiss Federal Institutes of Technology (ETH Board, German: Rat der Eidgenössischen Technischen Hochschulen, French: Conseil des écoles polytechniques fédérales) is the strategic unit elected by the Swiss Federal Council to manage the Swiss Federal Institutes of Technology Domain (ETH Domain).

It determines the domain's strategic direction and allocates the funding provided by the Swiss Confederation to the six institutions. It secures the necessary executive management capacity, nominates the six institutions' presidents and directors for election by the Federal Council and appoints professors for both Swiss Federal Institutes of Technology: the ETHZ and the EPFL.

In pursuit of its vision, the ETH Board dedicates its energies to promoting the excellence of the ETH Domain, addressing both internal and external issues, and to fostering its international reputation. It also encourages dialogue between students, lecturers, researchers, society at large, the business world and government.

The ETH board and ETH Domain are administratively attached to the Federal Department of Economic Affairs, Education and Research.

== See also ==
- Science and technology in Switzerland
