= ETH Zurich =

Public research university in Zurich

- Eidgenössische Technische Hochschule Zürich
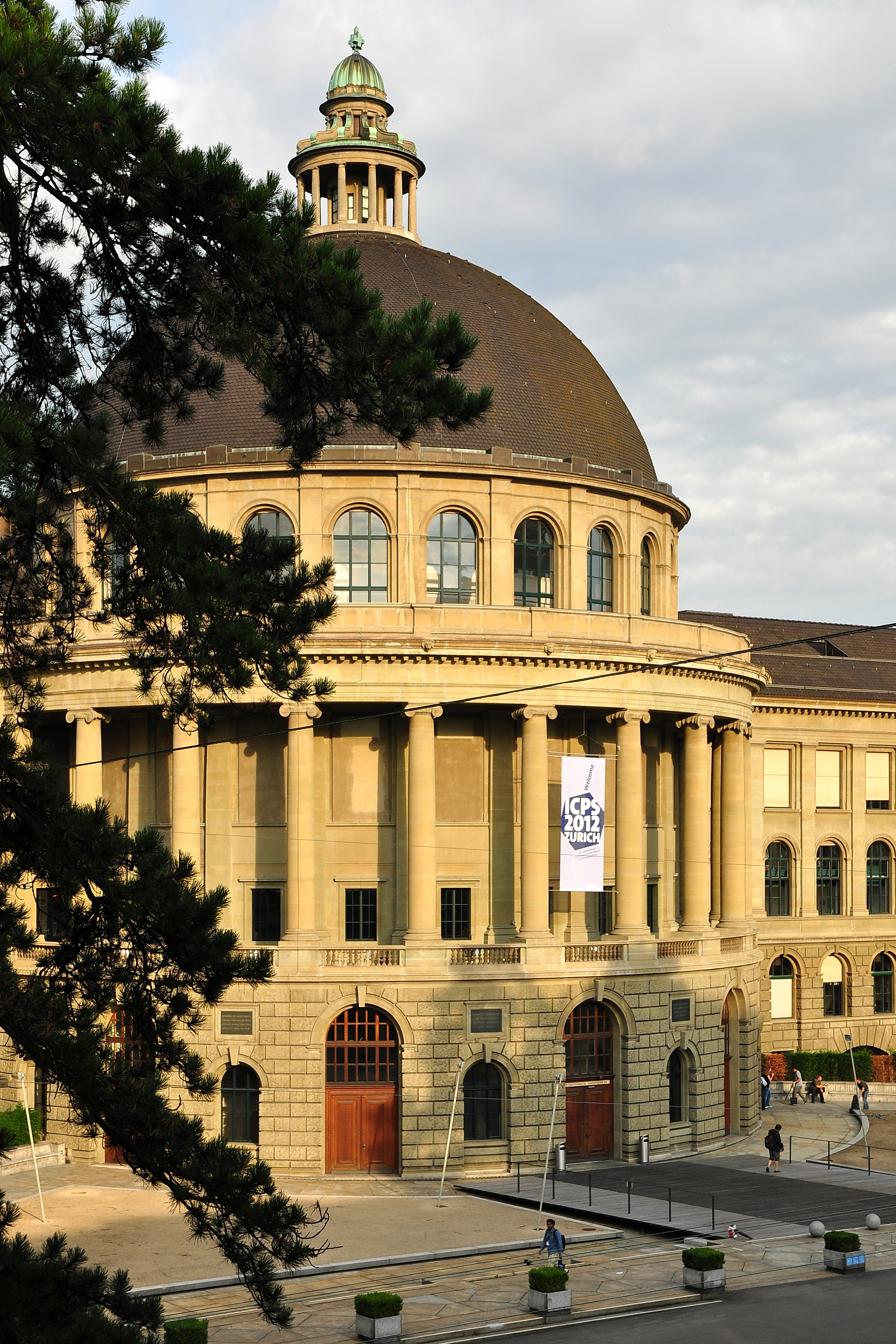
- ETH Zurich main building
- Other names: Swiss Federal Institute of Technology in Zurich, German: Polytechnikum, poly (polytechnic) (colloquially)
- Former name: Federal Polytechnic School (Eidgenössische polytechnische Schule) (1855–1911)
- Type: Public
- Established: February 7, 1854; 172 years ago
- Affiliations: CESAER, ENHANCE Alliance, EUA, IARU, IDEA League, LERU
- Budget: CHF 2.051 billion (2025)
- President: Joël Mesot
- Rector: Günther Dissertori
- Academic staff: 6,634 (including doctoral students, excluding 516 professors of all ranks) (full-time equivalents end of 2025)
- Administrative staff: 3,431 (full-time equivalents end of 2025)
- Students: 26,942 (headcount 2025)
- Undergraduates: 11,520
- Postgraduates: 10,144
- Doctoral students: 4,266
- Other students: 1,012
- Location: Rämistrasse 101, Zurich, Switzerland; 47°22′35″N 8°32′53″E
- Campus: Urban
- Language: German, English (Masters and upwards, some Bachelors)
- Colors: Black and white
- Website: ethz.ch

ETH Zurich (German: Eidgenössische Technische Hochschule Zürich; English: Swiss Federal Institute of Technology Zurich) is a public university in Zurich, Switzerland. Founded by the Swiss federal government in 1854, the university primarily teaches and conducts research in science, technology, engineering, and mathematics (STEM). ETH Zurich is widely regarded as one of the world's leading universities, particularly in the sciences, and consistently ranks among the top universities worldwide.

Like its sister institution École Polytechnique Fédérale de Lausanne (EPFL), ETH Zurich is part of the Swiss Federal Institutes of Technology Domain, a consortium of universities and research institutes under the Swiss Federal Department of Economic Affairs, Education and Research. As of 2025, ETH Zurich enrolled 26,942 students, of whom 4,266 were pursuing doctoral degrees.

Students, faculty, and researchers affiliated with ETH Zurich include 22 Nobel laureates, including Albert Einstein; 2 Fields Medalists; 3 Pritzker Prize winners; and 1 Turing Award recipient. It is a founding member of the IDEA League and the International Alliance of Research Universities (IARU), as well as a member of CESAER, the League of European Research Universities (LERU), and the ENHANCE Alliance.

Location: ETH Zurich, Switzerland

== History ==
ETH Zurich was founded on 7 February 1854 by the Swiss Confederation and began giving its first lectures on 16 October 1855 as a polytechnic institute (eidgenössische polytechnische Schule) at various sites throughout the city of Zurich. It initially consisted of six faculties: architecture, civil engineering, mechanical engineering, chemistry, forestry, and an integrated department for mathematics, natural sciences, literature, and social and political sciences.

Locally, it is still known as Polytechnikum or simply Poly, derived from the original name eidgenössische polytechnische Schule, which translates to "federal polytechnic school".

ETH Zurich is a federal institute under direct administration by the Swiss government. The creation of a new federal university was heavily disputed at the time; liberals advocated for a "federal university," while conservatives wanted universities to remain under cantonal control, fearing an increase in liberal political power. Initially, ETH was co-located in the buildings of the University of Zurich.

From 1905 to 1908, under the presidency of Jérôme Franel, ETH Zurich restructured its course programs to those of a university and was granted the right to award doctorates. The first doctorates were awarded in 1909. In 1911, the institution received its current name, Eidgenössische Technische Hochschule. Another reorganization in 1924 structured the university into 12 departments. Today, it has 16 departments.

ETH Zurich, along with EPFL and four associated research institutes, forms the "ETH Domain" to collaborate on scientific projects.

== Campus ==
ETH Zurich has two campuses, namely Zentrum and Hönggerberg; since 2007, ETH Zurich is also present in Basel with one department. The Zentrum campus grew around the main building, which was constructed 1858–1864.

=== Zentrum campus ===
The Zentrum campus consists of various buildings and institutions throughout the city of Zurich.

The Zentrum campus houses the:

- Department of Mathematics (D-MATH)
- Department of Computer Science (D-INFK)
- Department of Humanities, Social and Political Sciences (D-GESS)
- Department of Information Technology and Electrical Engineering (D-ITET)
- Department of Mechanical and Process Engineering (D-MAVT)
- Department of Environmental Systems Science (D-USYS)
- Department of Earth and Planetary Sciences (D-EAPS)
- Department of Management, Technology, and Economics (D-MTEC)
- Department of Health Sciences and Technology (D-HEST)

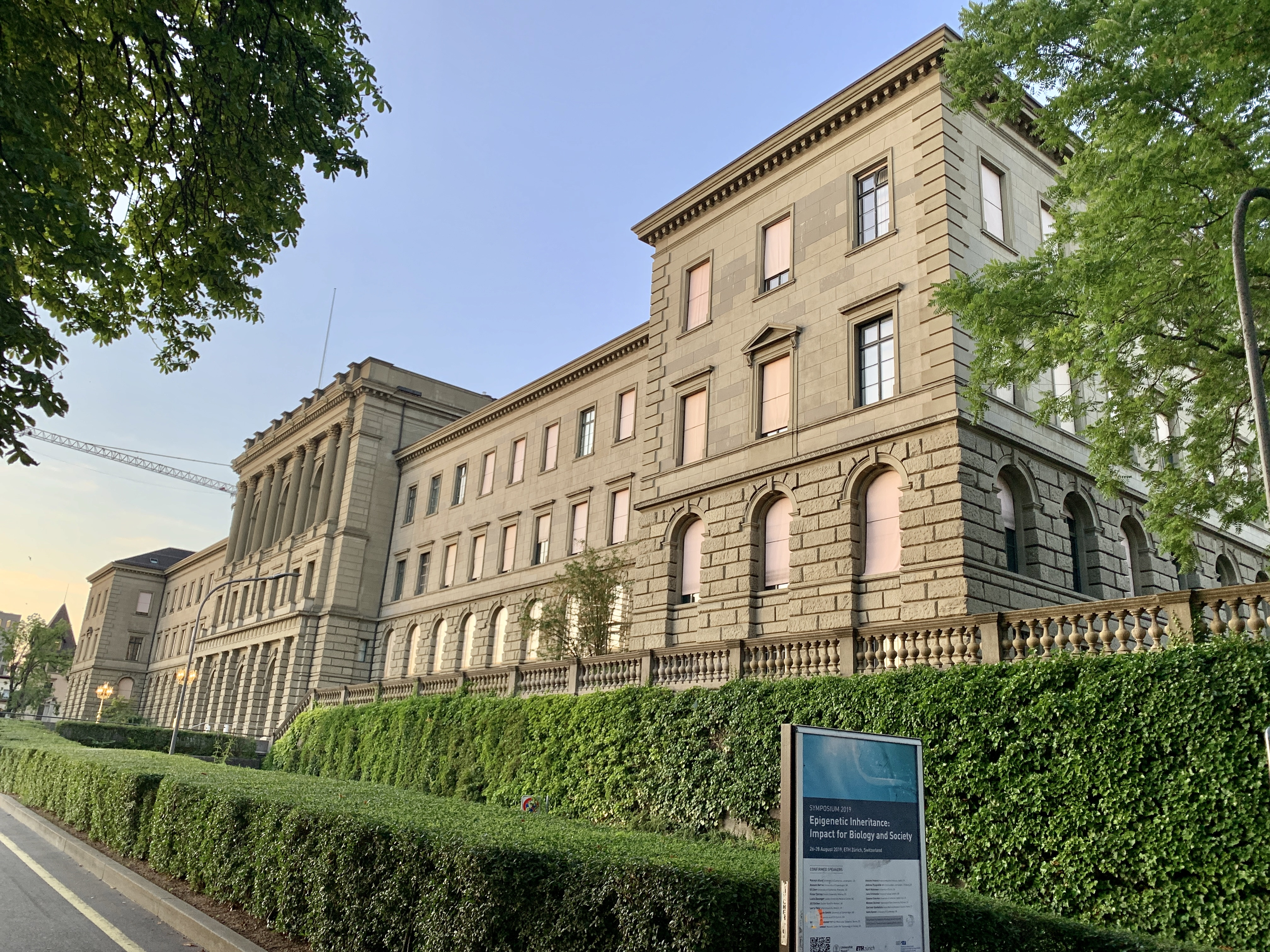
View onto the main building from the Polyterrasse

The main building of ETH Zurich was built from 1858 to 1864 under Gustav Zeuner; the architect, however, was Gottfried Semper, who was a professor of architecture at ETH Zurich at the time and one of the most important architectural writers and theorists of the age. Semper worked in a neoclassical style that was unique to him; and the namesake and architect of the Semperoper in Dresden. It emphasized bold and clear massings with a detailing, such as the rusticated ground level and giant order above, that derived in part from the work of Andrea Palladio and Donato Bramante. During the construction of the University of Zurich, the south wing of the building was allocated to the University until its own new main building was constructed (1912–1914). At about the same time, Semper's ETH Zurich building was enlarged and received its cupola.

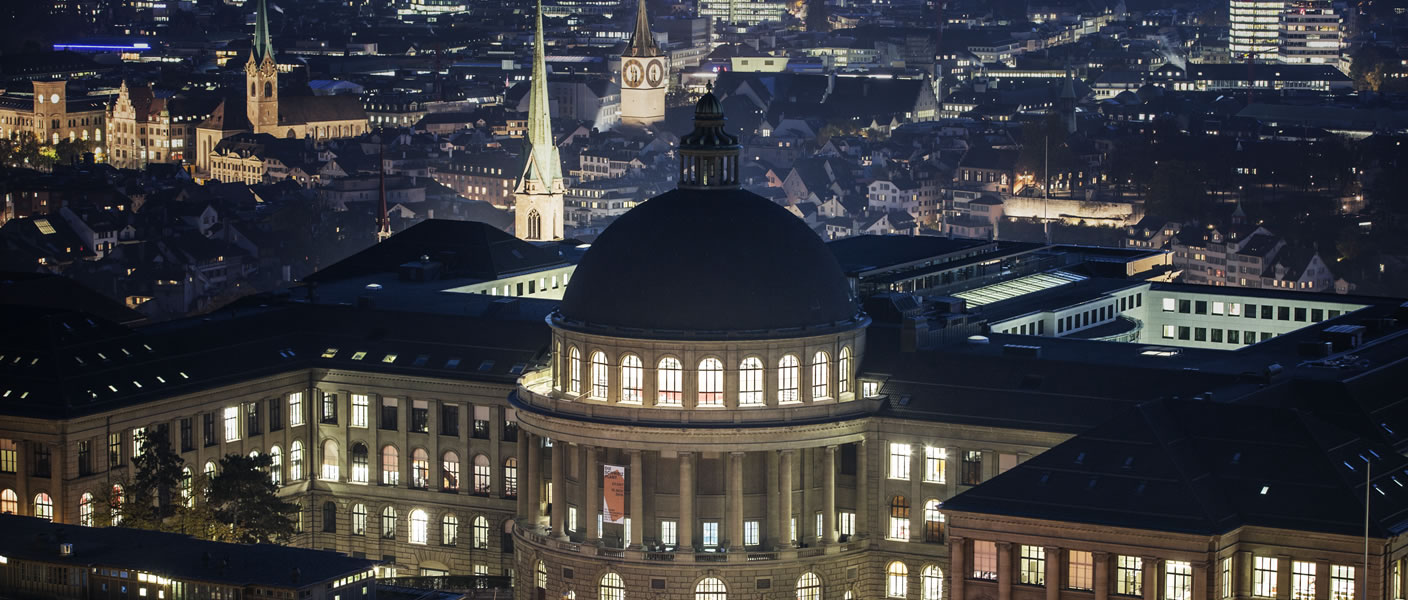
ETH Zurich's main building at night

The main building stands directly across the street from the University Hospital of Zurich and, right alongside the main building of the University of Zurich.

=== Hönggerberg campus ===
The Hönggerberg campus is a more classical university campus, consisting mainly of university buildings and student accommodation.

The Hönggerberg campus houses the:

- Department of Architecture (D-ARCH)
- Department of Civil, Environmental and Geomatic Engineering (D-BAUG)
- Department of Materials (D-MATL)
- Department of Biology (D-BIOL)
- Department of Chemistry and Applied Biosciences (D-CHAB)
- Department of Physics (D-PHYS)

There is also an ASVZ sports centre which is accessible to all students and faculty, and includes a gym, beach volleyball court, football field, and martial-arts rooms. In 2005, ETH Zurich's 150th anniversary, an extensive project called "Science City" for the Hönggerberg Campus was started with the goal to transform the campus into an attractive district based on the principle of sustainability.

=== Basel location ===
The Department of Biosystems Science and Engineering (D-BSSE) is located on Campus Schällemätteli in close vicinity to the University of Basel, the University Hospital and the Children's Hospital, and several other research institutions as well as major players in the chemical and pharmaceutical industries. The concentration of life science institutions in this area of Europe, and Basel's tri-national reach, motivated ETH Zurich to establish a satellite campus in Basel in 2007. A train ride of 55 minutes connects the location in Basel with Zurich.

== Research and education ==
Undergraduate education at ETH Zurich is marked by the distinctive Basisprüfungen ("base examinations"), intensive first-year examination blocks, typically encompassing foundational subjects in mathematics, physics, and engineering disciplines. These exams serve both as a filter and as preparation for advanced, research-oriented coursework. Students must pass these examinations within two attempts, with failure rates in mathematics-intensive programmes often reaching between 50% and 60%. Doctoral education at ETH emphasizes hands-on research experience, where PhD candidates are hired directly as paid employees in professors' laboratories, conducting independent research and actively contributing to teaching. Many departments further structure doctoral training through thematic graduate schools, promoting collaborative research with multiple advisers and international cooperation, notably with the University of Zurich.

Its research is especially focused on the STEM areas and ETH hosts several research hubs.

In 2026, ETH Zurich entered a ten-year partnership with IBM focused on artificial intelligence and quantum computing research.

=== ETH AI Center ===
The ETH AI Center is ETH Zurich's central hub for artificial intelligence research. It is an active member of the European Laboratory for Learning and Intelligent Systems (ELLIS), hosting the ELLIS unit in Zurich and offering ELLIS PhD fellowships. The center comprises 1,500 researchers across 16 departments. Through the Max Planck ETH Center for Learning Systems (CLS), it cooperates closely with the Max Planck Institute for Intelligent Systems, jointly funding research and supervising doctoral students. It also hosts recurring events, such as the AI+X Summit, the Zurich AI Festival, and AI House Davos.

The center leads projects of national scope, including the Swiss AI Initiative – launched in 2023 as an open-source effort for AI foundation models – operating under the Swiss National AI Institute (SNAI), a joint body of ETH Zurich and EPFL. The center also runs Apertus, an open multilingual language model trained on 15 trillion tokens across over 1,000 languages, among them Swiss German and Romansh.

=== Swiss National Supercomputing Center ===
The Swiss National Supercomputing Center is an autonomous organizational unit of the ETH Zurich. It is a national facility based in Lugano-Cornaredo, offering high-performance computing services for Swiss-based scientists. In 2024 it deployed the Alps Supercomputer, existing of over 10,000 H100 Nvidia GPUs, making it one of the largest academic supercomputers in the world.

=== ETH Laboratory of Ion Beam Physics ===
The ETH Laboratory of Ion Beam Physics (LIB) is a physics laboratory located in Science City. It specializes in accelerator mass spectrometry (AMS) and the use of ion beam based techniques with applications in archeology, earth sciences, life sciences, material sciences and fundamental physics.

=== Spin-offs ===
ETH Zurich promotes technology and knowledge transfer through an entrepreneurial ecosystem to foster spin-offs and start-ups. As of 2022, 527 ETH Zurich spin-off companies had been created.

=== Global Initiatives ===
==== Singapore-ETH Centre ====
The Singapore-ETH Centre was established in 2010 by ETH Zurich and Singapore's National Research Foundation (NRF). It develops practical solutions to challenges on urban sustainability, resilience, liveability and health. This research hub brings together over 250 researchers worldwide working on the selected topics.

==== ETH Zurich Campus Heilbronn ====
A teaching and research center for responsible digital transformation is established on the educational campus of the Dieter Schwarz Foundation in Heilbronn, Germany. Activities are planned in areas such as artificial intelligence and cybersecurity. This center will be operated in the form of a non-profit limited liability company under German law and started operation at the beginning of 2025.

== Rankings and reputation ==
University rankings

Global – Overall
- ARWU World: 19 (2026)
- QS World: 8 (2026)
- THE World: 11 (2026)

Regional – Overall
- QS Europe: 2 (2026)
- THE Europe: 4 (2026)

Historically, ETH Zurich has achieved its reputation particularly in the fields of chemistry, mathematics, physics and computer science. There are 22 Nobel laureates who are associated with ETH Zurich, the most recent of whom is Didier Queloz, awarded the Nobel Prize in Physics in 2019. Albert Einstein is perhaps its most famous alumnus.

ETH Zurich is ranked 8th worldwide (first in Switzerland) in the QS World University Rankings 2026, 11th worldwide (first in Switzerland) in the Times Higher Education World University Rankings 2026, and 22nd worldwide in the Academic Ranking of World Universities 2025. ETH Zurich ranked 2nd in Europe in the 2026 QS Europe rankings. In the 2023 Nature Index of academic institutions, ETH Zurich ranked 20th worldwide and first in Switzerland.

In the 2026 QS Word University Rankings by subject, ETH Zurich was ranked third worldwide in engineering and technology. In 2024, it ranked first worldwide in the earth and marine sciences, geology, and geophysics. In the 2024 THE World University Rankings by subject, it was the top Swiss university in all ranked subjects. In the 2023 ARWU Subject Ranking, the university was ranked within the top 10 worldwide in civil engineering, water resources, environmental engineering, automation, mathematics, earth sciences, and ecology.

== Student life ==
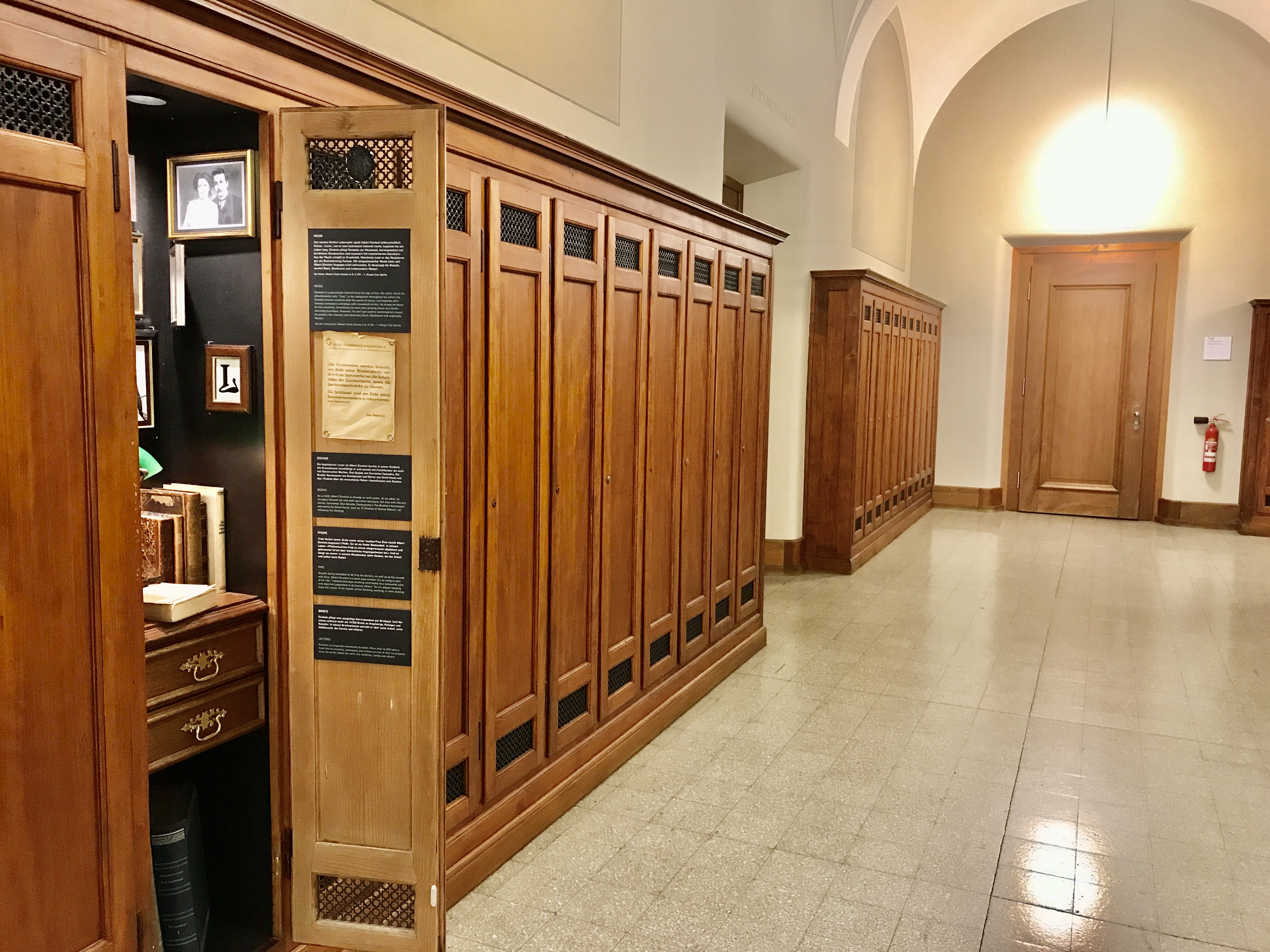
Albert Einstein's former student locker at ETH Zurich

=== Tuition and financial assistance ===
Being a public university, the subsidized (by Swiss federal tax) tuition fees are CHF 730 per semester. Since autumn 2025, tuition fees for foreign students have been tripled to CHF 2190 per semester. Both merit and need based scholarships are also available.

=== Student associations ===
ETH Zurich has well over 100 student associations. Most notable is the VSETH (Verband der Studierenden an der ETH) which forms the umbrella organization of all field of study specific student associations and comprises a large variety of committees such as the Student Sustainability Committee and the ETH Model United Nations. The associations regularly organize events with varying size and popularity. Events of the neighboring University of Zurich are well-attended by ETH Zurich students and vice versa.

The largest career fair on campus is the Polymesse which is organized by students in the Forum und Contact committee of VSETH. Many student associations however organize career fairs specifically for the students in their departments. The VSETH is also the official representation of the student body towards the school and has been working with ETH on various projects with the aim of improving the students' experience at ETH. The representation towards the various departments is handled by the respective student associations.

ETH Juniors is another student organization. It forms a bridge between industry and ETH Zurich and offers many services for students and companies alike as a student-led consulting group.

=== Sports ===
The Academic Sports Association of Zurich (ASVZ) offers more than 120 sports. The biggest annual sports event is the SOLA-Stafette (SOLA relay race) which consists of 14 sections over a total distance of 140 kilometres (87 mi).

=== Student Project House ===
In 2017, ETH Zurich board approved the creation of a "Student Project House" to encourage student projects and foster innovation. A test consisting of a "makerspace" and co-working space was established on the Hönggerberg campus, followed by a 6-story space near the ETH Zurich main building. Both locations function as a unified entity for the purpose of qualifications, staffing and decision making. While both makerspaces offer similar tools, the central one is significantly larger and also hosts a rentable auditorium, intended for pitching projects to faculty to gain funding, and a bar.

Both makerspaces include workspaces for wood- and metalworking, electronics fabrication, as well as an array of 3D-printers for students to use at a little over material cost. Both also feature a shop for students to buy items such as resistors in lower quantities than ordinarily, while passing down the savings of bulk purchases. The makerspaces are managed and staffed entirely by students. A new space is expected to open on the Hönggerberg campus in 2024.

=== Engineering competitions ===
The Swiss Academic Spaceflight Initiative (ARIS) (German: Akademische Raumfahrt Initiative Schweiz) is an organisation at ETH Zurich that focuses on the development of space related technologies. The most prominent area of research is in the development of a sounding rocket that is flown yearly at the Spaceport America Cup. The AMZ – Academic Motorsports Association (German: Akademischer Motorsportverein Zürich) is the ETH Zurich's Formula Student team. Swissloop is ETH Zurich's newest competition team that is working on the development of a hyperloop system.

== Traditions ==
The Polyball, which is the biggest decorated ball in Europe, takes places annually in the main building of ETH and is organized by students and former students in the KOSTA foundation. It has been taking place since the 1880s.

The amicable rivalry between ETH Zurich and its neighbor, the University of Zurich, has been cultivated since 1951 (Uni-Poly). There has been an annual rowing match between teams from the two institutions on the river Limmat.

There are many regular symposia and conferences at ETH Zurich, most notably the annual Wolfgang Pauli Lectures, in honor of former ETH Zurich Professor Wolfgang Pauli. Distinct lecturers, among them 24 Nobel laureates, have held lectures of the various fields of natural sciences at this conference since 1962.

== Notable alumni and faculty ==
ETH Zurich has produced and attracted many famous scientists, including Albert Einstein and John von Neumann. More than twenty two Nobel laureates have either studied at ETH Zurich or were awarded the Nobel Prize for their work achieved at ETH Zurich. Other alumni include scientists who were distinguished with the highest accolades such as the Fields Medal, Pritzker Prize and Turing Award, among other distinctions in their respective fields. Academic achievements aside, ETH Zurich has been alma mater to many Olympic medalists and world champions.

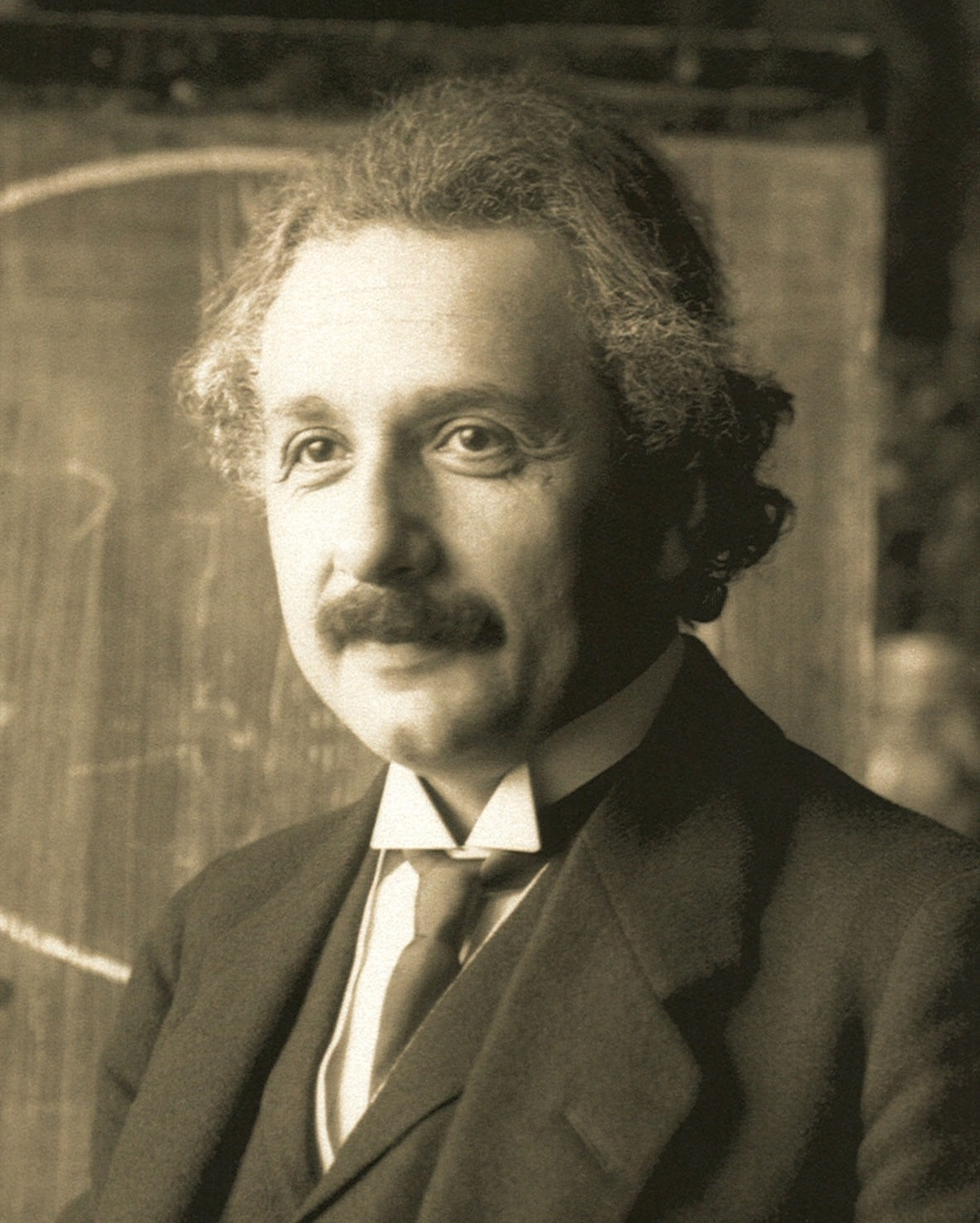
Albert Einstein, 1921 Nobel Prize in Physics for the photoelectric effect

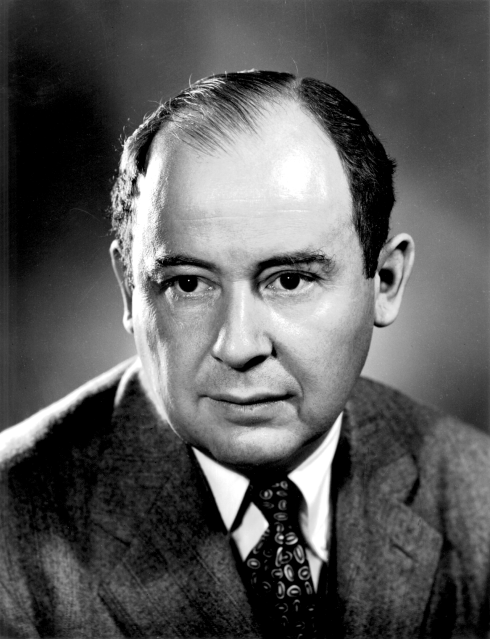
John von Neumann, polymath - pioneer in computing, quantum physics and game theory

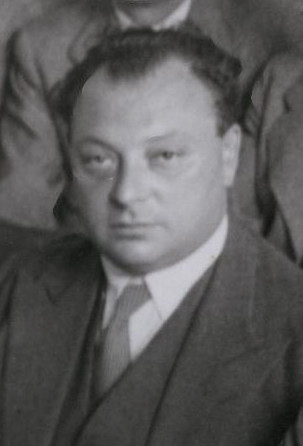
Wolfgang Pauli, 1945 Nobel Prize in Physics for the Pauli-Exclusion principle

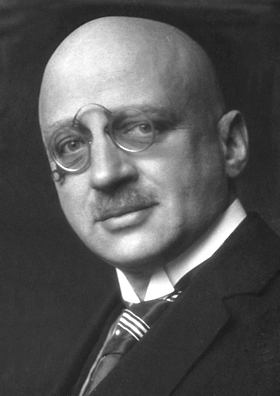
Fritz Haber, 1918 Nobel Prize in Chemistry for the Haber-Bosch Process

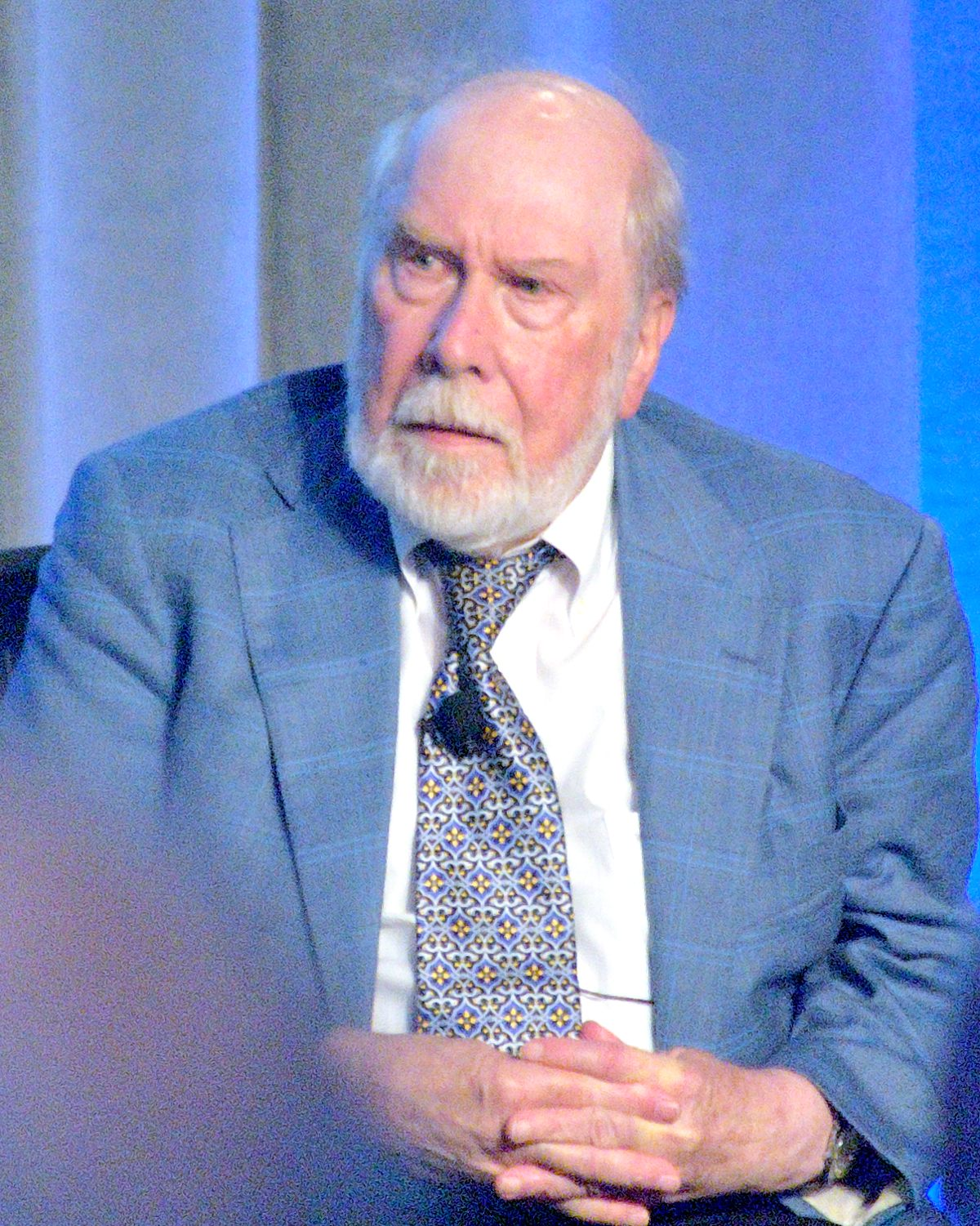
Niklaus Wirth, 1984 Turing Award winner for the programming language Pascal

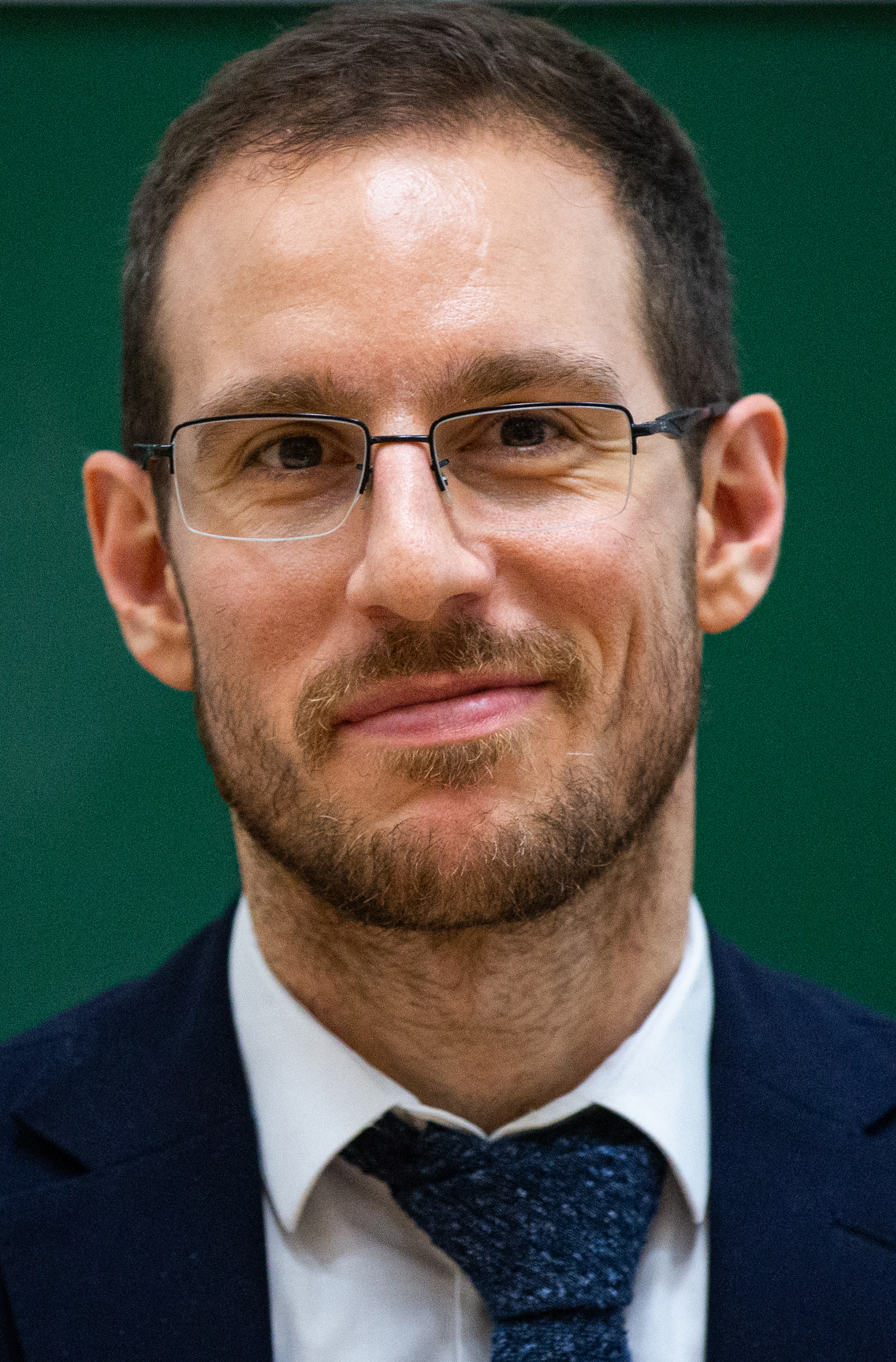
Alessio Figalli, 2018 Fields Medal for his work on partial differential equations

== Related organizations ==
=== Collegium Helveticum ===
The Collegium Helveticum is an Institute for Advanced Study. It is jointly supported and operated by the ETH Zurich, the University of Zurich and the Zurich University of the Arts. It is dedicated to transdisciplinary research and acts as a think tank as well. Fellows are elected for five years to work together on a particular subject. For the period 2016–2020, the research focus is on digital societies.

=== ETH Zurich Foundation ===
The ETH Zurich Foundation (de:ETH Zürich Foundation) is a legal entity on its own (a Swiss non-profit foundation) and as such not part of the ETH Zurich. Its purpose is to raise funds to support chosen institutes, projects, faculty and students at the ETH Zurich. It receives charitable donations from companies, foundations and private individuals. The associated organization ETH Foundation USA raises awareness in the USA specifically. It can be compared with university endowments in the US. However, the ETH Zurich is a public university so that the funds of this foundation are much smaller than at comparable private universities. Examples of funded teaching and research are:

- New institutes such as the Wyss Translational Center Zurich
- Additional professorships
- Rössler Prize
- Pioneer fellowships
- Excellence scholarships

=== Military Academy ===
The Military Academy is an institution for the education, training and development of career officers of the Swiss Armed Forces. The scientific part of this organization is attached to the ETH Zurich, while other parts such as training and an assessment center are under the direct management of the defense sector of the Swiss Federal Government.

=== ETH Alumni Association ===
The ETH Alumni Association has been in existence since 1889. It has around 35,000 members. Membership is primarily open to former students, though academic faculty and post-docs are also eligible to join as members. After the collapse of Credit Suisse in 2025 the association took over sponsorship of the Award for Best Teaching.

== See also ==
- EPFL
- Laboratory for Energy Conversion
- List of universities in Switzerland
- List of largest universities by enrollment in Switzerland
- List of forestry universities and colleges
- Science and technology in Switzerland
- Swiss Electromagnetics Research and Engineering Centre
- ETH Zurich University Archives
- Swiss Federal Institute for Vocational Education and Training
