= ETH Domain =

Union of Swiss University

The Domain of the Swiss Federal Institutes of Technology (ETH Domain, German: ETH-Bereich, French: Domaine des Écoles polytechniques fédérales) is a union of Swiss governmental universities and research institutions. It primarily consists of the following institutions:

Federal institutes of technology

- Swiss Federal Institute of Technology in Zurich (ETHZ)
- Swiss Federal Institute of Technology in Lausanne (EPFL)

Federal research institutes

- Paul Scherrer Institute (PSI)
- Swiss Federal Laboratories for Materials Science and Technology (Empa)
- Swiss Federal Institute of Aquatic Science and Technology (Eawag)
- Swiss Federal Institute for Forest, Snow and Landscape Research (WSL)

Competence centers

- CCEM (Energy & Mobility)
- CCES (Environment & Sustainability)
- CCMX (Materials Science & Technology)
- NCCBI (Biomedical Imaging)

== ETH Board ==
The ETH Domain is governed by the strategic unit Board of the Swiss Federal Institutes of Technology (ETH Board).

== See also ==
- Science and technology in Switzerland
- List of institutions using the term "institute of technology" or "polytechnic"
