= Health Insurance Act: standardised financing of benefits =

Health Insurance Act: Standardised Financing of Benefits
| November 24, 2024 |
- Amendment to the Federal Health Insurance Act (Standardised Financing of Benefits)

Results
| Choice | Votes | % |
|---|---|---|
| Yes | 53.3 | 53.30% |
| No | 46.7 | 46.70% |

The Health Insurance Act: Standardised Financing of Benefits (Note: German: Volksabstimmung zur Änderung des Bundesgesetzes über die Krankenversicherung (KVG) (Einheitliche Finanzierung der Leistungen); French: Votation populaire concernant la modification de la loi fédérale sur l’assurance-maladie (LAMal) (financement uniforme des prestations); Italian: Votazione popolare sulla modifica della legge federale sull’assicurazione malattie (LAMal) (Finanziamento uniforme delle prestazioni)) was a Swiss referendum held on 24 November 2024 to amend the Federal Health Insurance Act (KVG/LAMal) to introduce uniform financing for outpatient, inpatient, and long-term care services under compulsory health insurance. The referendum was approved by 53.3% of voters, enabling the Federal Council to implement uniform financing in two phases starting 1 January 2028, shifting some financial burden from premiums to cantonal taxes to potentially ease premium increases.

== Background ==
Switzerland’s compulsory health insurance (OKP) system finances healthcare services differently depending on the type of care. Inpatient hospital treatments (with overnight stays) are funded with at least 55% of costs covered by cantons through taxes, while outpatient treatments (e.g., doctor visits or same-day hospital procedures) are fully funded by health insurance premiums. Long-term care, whether at home or in nursing homes, is financed by a mix of patient contributions, insurance premiums, and cantonal subsidies. This fragmented system created incentives for inpatient over outpatient care, as insurers bore a lower cost share for hospital stays, contributing to rising healthcare costs and premiums.

The amendment proposed a uniform funding model where cantons contribute at least 26.9% and insurers up to 73.1% of net costs (after patient co-pays) for all OKP services, regardless of care type. The reform aimed to eliminate financial incentives favoring inpatient care, promote outpatient treatments, and improve care coordination to reduce unnecessary treatments and costs. The government estimates it will save approximately CHF 2bn per year in premiums.

The proposal was debated in Parliament for 14 years, starting in 2009, and was adopted on 22 December 2023. A referendum was triggered by the Swiss Union of Public Service Personnel (VPOD), supported by the Swiss Trade Union Federation, who argued the reform gave too much power to insurance companies and could compromise care quality, particularly in nursing homes.

== Campaign ==
Proponents, including the Federal Council, Parliament, most political parties, and healthcare organizations (e.g., hospitals, Spitex, and insurers), argued that EFAS would reduce inefficiencies, such as duplicate tests or unnecessary hospitalizations, potentially saving up to CHF 440 million annually. They emphasized that uniform financing would encourage cost-effective outpatient care and relieve premium payers by shifting some costs to cantonal taxes starting in 2028.

Opponents, led by VPOD under the slogan “Stop EFAS,” claimed the reform would increase insurance companies’ influence, as they would manage billions in tax funds alongside premiums. They argued this could prioritize profits over patient needs, particularly in long-term care, and lead to higher premiums and worse working conditions for care staff.

== Results ==
The referendum passed with 53.3% voting in favor. The results by canton are detailed below:

Official results of the referendum
| Canton | Yes (%) | No (%) | Turnout (%) |
|---|---|---|---|
| Aargau | 60.3 | 39.7 | 40.8 |
| Appenzell Ausserrhoden | 62.4 | 37.6 | 46.4 |
| Appenzell Innerrhoden | 61.1 | 38.9 | 39.4 |
| Basel-Landschaft | 57.8 | 42.2 | 44.4 |
| Basel-Stadt | 52.7 | 47.3 | 54.2 |
| Bern | 53.4 | 46.6 | 45.5 |
| Fribourg | 43.4 | 56.6 | 40.7 |
| Geneva | 34.5 | 65.5 | 46.8 |
| Glarus | 58.2 | 41.8 | 36.7 |
| Graubünden | 59.5 | 40.5 | 39.8 |
| Jura | 36.9 | 63.1 | 39.8 |
| Lucerne | 61.1 | 38.9 | 44.5 |
| Neuchâtel | 34.4 | 65.6 | 39.9 |
| Nidwalden | 62.5 | 37.5 | 46.1 |
| Obwalden | 62.1 | 37.9 | 44.1 |
| Schaffhausen | 60.9 | 39.1 | 63.9 |
| Schwyz | 61.1 | 38.9 | 46.3 |
| Solothurn | 55.3 | 44.7 | 42.1 |
| St. Gallen | 64.3 | 35.7 | 44.6 |
| Thurgau | 60.5 | 39.5 | 42.3 |
| Ticino | 50.5 | 49.5 | 40.9 |
| Uri | 60.3 | 39.7 | 49.6 |
| Valais | 46.5 | 53.5 | 41.6 |
| Vaud | 37.7 | 62.3 | 47.4 |
| Zug | 62.8 | 37.2 | 51.7 |
| Zürich | 57.7 | 42.3 | 47.3 |
| Total | 53.3 | 46.7 | 44.9 |

== See also ==
- Healthcare in Switzerland
- 2024 Swiss Referendums
- List of Swiss federal referendums
- Voting in Switzerland
