= 2024 Swiss referendums =

- 3 March 2024

Initiative for a 13th OASI pension payment
For	58%
Against	42%

Pensions Initiative (retirement age)
For	25%
Against	75%

Maps
- Results by canton Yes 50–60% 60–70% 70–80% 80–90% No 50–60% 60–70% 80–90%

Several referendums were held in Switzerland during 2024. National votes were held on 3 March, 9 June, and 22 September, and others were held on 24 November.

== March referendums ==
Two national referendums were held on 3 March 2024. Both were related to the pension system.

- The "Initiative for a 13th OASI pension payment", proposed to add a 13th month of pension.
- The "Pensions Initiative (retirement age)" aimed to increase the retirement age this year, and raise it automatically every year.

The Swiss government recommended voters to reject both referendums, however polls showed voters were likely to accept the first initiative and reject the second, which was also the final result.

=== Results ===
Question	For			Against			Invalid/ blank	Total votes	Registered voters	Turnout	Outcome
Question	Votes	%	Cantons	Votes	%	Cantons	Invalid/ blank	Total votes	Registered voters	Turnout	Outcome
Initiative for a 13th OASI pension payment	1,884,096	58.25	14 2/2	1,350,325	41.75	6 4/2	28,758	3,263,179	5,591,446	58.36	Approved
Pensions Initiative (retirement age)	808,578	25.25	0	2,393,930	74.75	20 6/2	47,547	3,250,055	5,591,446	58.13	Rejected
Source: Federal Chancellery

== June referendums ==
Four referendum votes were held on 9 June 2024; two were regarding health insurance premiums, one regarding vaccinations, and one against a recent law concerning sustainable energy.

=== Results ===
Question	For			Against			Invalid/ blank	Total votes	Registered voters	Turnout	Outcome
Question	Votes	%	Cantons	Votes	%	Cantons	Invalid/ blank	Total votes	Registered voters	Turnout	Outcome
Premium Relief Initiative	1,117,095	44.53	7 1/2	1,391,645	55.47	13 5/2	36,415	2,545,155	5,599,464	45.45	Rejected
Cost-Brake Initiative	927,386	37.23	5 0/2	1,563,769	62.77	15 6/2	51,273	2,542,428	5,599,464	45.40	Rejected
Initiative for Freedom and Physical Integrity	655,106	26.27	0 0/2	1,838,740	73.73	20 6/2	46,842	2,540,688	5,599,464	45.37	Rejected
Federal Act on Secure Electricity Supply from Renewable Energy Sources	1,717,607	68.72	–	781,811	31.28	–	44,008	2,543,426	5,599,464	45.42	Approved
Source: Federal Chancellery

== September referendums ==
Two national referendums were held on 22 September 2024 to vote on a reform of occupational pension schemes and a biodiversity initiative.

The reform of occupational pension schemes was supported by the government and opposed by the left-wing parties and trade unions. The biodiversity initiative had been tabled by nature and environmental protection associations, and opposed by a broad alliance of the main right-wing and centrist parties, farming circles and economic organisations.

Both referendums were rejected by voters.

=== Results ===
Question	For			Against			Invalid/ blank	Total votes	Registered voters	Turnout	Outcome
Question	Votes	%	Cantons	Votes	%	Cantons	Invalid/ blank	Total votes	Registered voters	Turnout	Outcome
Biodiversity Initiative	926,059	36.96	1 1/2	1,579,467	63.04	19 5/2	30,435	2,535,961	5,611,289	45.19	Rejected
Occupational Pension Reform	810,569	32.87	–	1,655,513	67.13	–	61,464	2,527,546	5,611,289	45.04	Rejected
Source: Federal Chancellery

== November referendums ==
Four referendums took place on 24 November, including one on three new motorways and tunnel expansions, one on changes to rental contracts, one on a decision by parliament to fix rates at which cantons can fund healthcare. A referendum was also held in Basel-Stadt whether to approve the grant of 34.96 million Swiss francs ($39.5 million) by cantonal authorities for the hosting of the Eurovision Song Contest 2025 in Basel.

Results showed negative results for additional road infrastructure and rent changes, while approving changes to healthcare funding. The Eurovision expenditure referendum in Basel also passed with 66.6% of voters in favour.

Question	For		Against		Invalid/ blank	Total votes	Registered voters	Turnout	Outcome
Question	Votes	%	Votes	%	Invalid/ blank	Total votes	Registered voters	Turnout	Outcome
Expansion programme for the national highways	1,181,560	47.30	1,316,505	52.70	32,205	2,530,270	5,615,207	45.06	Rejected
Tenancy Law: Subletting	1,196,643	48.42	1,274,818	51.58	49,968	2,521,429	5,615,207	44.90	Rejected
Tenancy Law: Termination to permit personal use	1,141,693	46.17	1,331,134	53.83	49,183	2,522,010	5,615,207	44.91	Rejected
Health Insurance Act: Standardised financing of benefits	1,302,687	53.31	1,140,884	46.69	77,010	2,520,581	5,615,207	44.89	Approved
Source: Federal Chancellery

== See also ==
- Swiss referendums by year:
  - 2023
  - 2024
  - 2025
