= Taxation in Switzerland =

Taxes in Switzerland are levied by the Swiss Confederation, the cantons and the municipalities.

== Legal framework ==
=== Fiscal sovereignty ===
Switzerland is a federal republic in which the sovereignty of the constituent states (the cantons) is limited by the enumerated powers delegated to the federal state (the Confederation) through the federal constitution. Consequently, the original authority to levy taxes is vested in the individual cantons of Switzerland through their constitutions. Within the bounds of the authority delegated to them by cantonal law, the municipalities may also levy taxes. The extent of that authority varies from canton to canton. While the formal framework of the most important cantonal direct taxes has been harmonised through the 1990 Federal Tax Harmonisation Law, the cantons (and, as the case may be, the municipalities) remain free to set their tax rates or establish new taxes, except on tax objects already taxed under federal law.

Since World War II, the federal constitution authorizes the Confederation to levy a number of taxes, the most significant of which are an income tax, a withholding tax and a value added tax. However, Switzerland is unique among modern sovereign states in that the authority to levy these taxes is limited in duration and extent. The Constitution imposes an upper limit on the federal tax rates and causes the federal authority to levy taxes to expire in 2035. A renewal of that authority requires a constitutional amendment, which must be approved in a popular referendum by both a majority of the popular vote and the cantons. If that renewal is not approved at the polls (as it has been six times since 1958), the Confederation itself will conceivably dissolve for lack of funds. All attempts to remove this limitation by amending the constitution to provide for a permanent federal authority to levy taxes have been rejected in Parliament or – no less than five times – by popular vote, most recently in 1991.

=== Constitutional limits to taxation ===
The federal constitution imposes certain limits on taxation at the federal, cantonal and municipal levels. To begin with, it provides that no tax may be levied except where provided for by federal, cantonal or municipal statute. Because statutes can at all levels be made subject to a popular referendum, Swiss tax rates are in practice set directly by the voters through instruments of direct democracy.

The constitution mandates that taxation must be general and equal in nature, and it must be proportionate to one's ability to pay. The Federal Supreme Court has interpreted this as prohibiting a regressive tax, although flat rate taxes (as instituted in several cantons) are held to be constitutional by tax law scholars. Moreover, double taxation by several cantons is constitutionally prohibited, as is a confiscatory rate of taxation.

== Direct taxes on natural persons ==
Total tax revenue as a percentage of GDP for Switzerland over the past several decades compared to other highly developed states

All people resident in Switzerland are liable for the taxation of their worldwide income and assets, except on the income and wealth from foreign business or real estate, or where tax treaties limit double taxation. For tax purposes, residence tax may arise if a person stays in Switzerland for 30 days, or for 90 days if he/she does not work. Moreover, non-residents are also taxed on certain Swiss assets or on the income from certain Swiss sources, such as from real estate, permanent business establishments or pensions. The income and assets of spouses are pooled and taxed jointly, but at a lower rate to offset the effects of tax progression. Generally, Switzerland offers "an advantageous tax system" (as per Lindemannlaw consultants).

=== Income tax ===
Either a progressive or proportional income tax is levied by the Confederation and by the cantons on the income of natural persons. The income tax is imposed as a payroll tax on foreign workers without a permanent residence (C) permit, and in the form of a withholding tax on certain transient persons, such as foreign musicians performing in Switzerland.

Taxable income includes all funds accruing to a person from all sources, in principle without deduction of losses or expenses, and including the rental value of a house lived in by its owner. However, capital gains on private property (such as profits from the sale of shares) are tax-free, except where the cantons levy a tax on real estate capital gains. Certain expenses are also deductible. These include social security or pension fund payments, expenses related to the gain of income (such as employment expenses and maintenance costs of real estate) and alimonies. Gifts and inheritances are also exempt from the income tax, but are subject to separate cantonal taxes.

Non-working foreigners resident in Switzerland may choose to pay a lump-sum tax instead of the normal income tax. The tax, which is generally much lower than the normal income tax, is nominally levied on the taxpayer's living expenses, but in practice (which varies from canton to canton), it is common to use five times or seven times the rent paid by the taxpayer as a basis for the lump-sum taxation.

In 2011, the federal income tax varied from a bracket of 1% (for single tax payers) and 0.77% (for married taxpayers) to the maximum rate of 11.5%. Individuals earning below 13,600 and couples earning below 27,000 Swiss francs were exempt. On cantonal level, tax rates vary heavily, Obwalden adapted a 1.8% flat tax on all personal income following a cantonal referendum in 2007. In most cantons, the rate is proportional with a maximum rate of 6.5% in Bern, whereas in Zurich it was 13% and in Geneva 17.58-.76% (depending upon taxes as single or jointly).

=== Wealth tax ===
A proportional wealth tax of around 0.3 %to 0.5% is levied by the cantons on the net worth of natural persons. The tax is levied on the value of all assets (such as real estate, shares or funds) after the deduction of any debts.

In November 2025, Swiss voters rejected a proposal to tax inheritances and gifts of more than 50 million Swiss Francs at 50%.

=== Church tax ===
Most cantons levy a church tax (Kirchensteuer / impôt ecclésiastique / imposta di culto) on the registered members of the religious communities they recognise under public law, collected through the cantonal tax system. The recognised bodies are usually the Roman Catholic Church and the Evangelical Reformed Church, and in a number of cantons also the Christian Catholic (Old Catholic) Church and the Jewish communities; recognition has generally not been extended to other faiths.

The tax is levied only on members of the recognised communities; a person of no religious affiliation does not pay it. It is assessed as a proportion of the cantonal or income tax and varies by canton and denomination—in Bern, for example, it is about 20.7 per cent of the income tax for Catholics and 18.4 per cent for Protestants. Payment is voluntary in Ticino, Neuchâtel, and Geneva, while the canton of Vaud levies no church tax and instead meets church costs from general taxation. In most cantons legal entities are also liable, though several—including Basel-Stadt, Schaffhausen, Appenzell Ausserrhoden, Aargau, and Geneva—exempt them; the taxation of companies has been politically contested.

=== Taxes by canton ===
Total federal, cantonal, municipal and church taxes in the cantonal capital for various gross incomes, in CHF (2014)
	Income of a single person							Income of a married couple with 2 children						
Cantons	20,000	40,000	60,000	80,000	100,000	200,000	500,000	20,000	40,000	60,000	80,000	100,000	200,000	500,000
Zurich	477	2,149	4,577	7,629	11,018	31,411	108,877	48	85	1,092	2,791	4,882	20,624	90,318
Berne	511	3,847	7,567	11,369	15,483	39,496	120,369	0	0	1,756	5,336	8,517	28,806	106,809
Lucerne	278	3,025	6,170	9,370	12,552	29,586	87,002	50	50	1,319	3,634	6,331	22,204	79,707
Uri	266	2,944	5,367	8,001	10,589	23,817	64,149	100	100	1,545	4,193	6,752	19,303	59,634
Schwyz	545	1,952	3,862	6,120	8,583	21,211	57,276	0	54	1,125	2,619	4,024	15,761	53,702
Obwald	340	2,596	5,042	7,502	9,907	22,029	58,451	0	0	1,604	4,199	6,523	18,578	54,999
Nidwald	361	2,530	5,137	7,905	10,709	25,455	65,696	50	50	812	2,756	5,196	19,159	62,707
Glaris	581	2,837	5,572	8,874	12,164	30,297	94,726	0	357	2,361	4,390	6,793	23,237	81,708
Zoug	148	1,049	2,197	3,586	5,729	19,488	51,434	0	0	0	359	1,059	6,943	45,645
Friburg	601	3,372	6,893	10,986	15,443	40,909	111,188	0	124	1,406	3,633	6,242	27,191	105,740
Soleure	803	3,707	7,479	11,546	15,770	39,274	108,967	80	375	2,921	5,364	8,672	29,143	101,170
Basle-City	0	2,770	7,034	11,322	15,586	37,075	110,510	0	0	0	2,987	7,251	28,739	93,319
Basle-Country	0	2,617	6,498	10,917	15,667	41,732	124,296	0	0	0	2,534	6,180	28,722	107,828
Schaffhouse	569	2,970	6,180	9,961	14,150	36,512	97,717	60	90	1,863	4,280	6,645	25,079	93,525
Appenzell Outer-Rhodes	697	3,161	6,249	9,809	13,503	33,396	89,536	0	409	2,739	5,075	7,664	26,582	86,494
Appenzell Inner-Rhodes	629	2,601	4,993	7,525	10,308	24,883	64,824	0	480	1,670	3,155	5,392	19,336	62,455
St Gall	376	3,141	7,102	11,475	16,116	39,961	106,857	0	0	1,015	3,622	6,531	28,108	99,717
Grisons	22	2,251	5,403	8,962	12,585	32,274	93,439	0	0	390	2,691	5,204	22,378	82,271
Argovia	0	2,375	5,722	9,283	13,004	32,960	98,249	0	122	1,283	3,237	5,839	23,388	85,035
Thurgovia	179	2,807	6,043	9,344	12,704	31,388	91,205	0	0	683	3,109	5,747	22,647	80,293
Tessin	307	1,998	5,295	9,065	13,138	35,748	110,578	40	40	721	1,841	4,189	24,016	99,484
Vaud	0	2,020	7,713	11,754	16,027	41,897	131,490	0	0	630	3,930	9,068	27,754	110,347
Valais	34	2,757	5,718	9,572	13,876	40,477	111,349	34	34	477	2,362	4,104	22,601	94,233
Neuchâtel	474	3,631	7,944	12,388	17,002	43,531	116,508	0	350	2,447	6,270	9,516	32,577	111,752
Geneva	25	1,969	5,788	10,398	15,103	39,708	123,070	25	25	25	348	3,093	24,145	98,891
Jura	479	3,380	7,175	11,817	16,441	42,682	125,006	0	0	1,616	4,710	8,593	30,506	110,001
Federal taxes only	0	133	432	936	1,838	9,976	45,268	0	0	0	0	87	6,002	40,842

== Corporate taxation ==
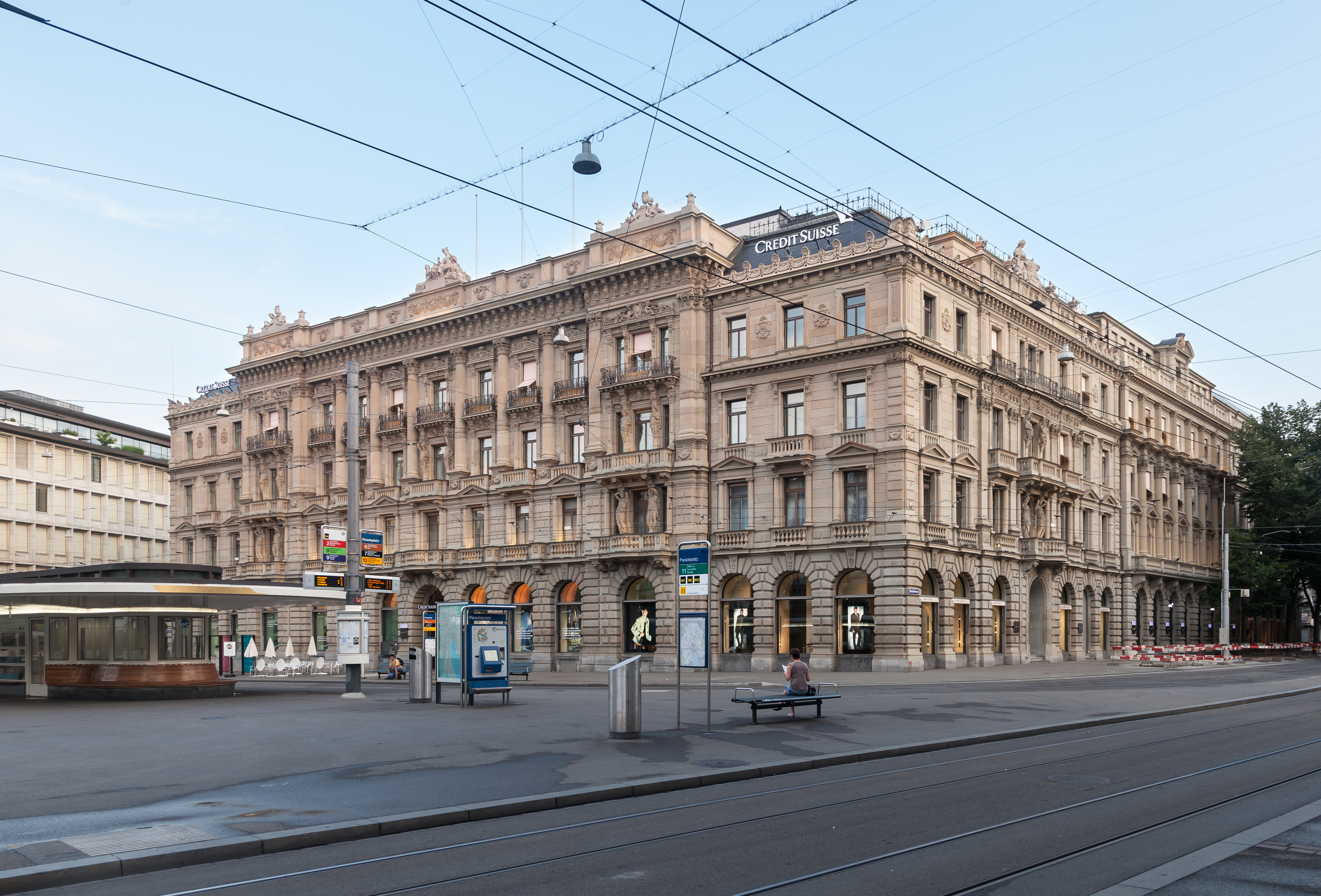
Swiss corporations are subject to composite taxes. Pictured: Credit Suisse

Switzerland has a "classical" corporate tax system in which a corporation and its owners or shareholders are taxed individually, causing economic double taxation. All legal persons are subject to the taxation of their profit and capital, with the exception of charitable organisations. Tax liability arises if either the legal seat or the effective management of a corporation is in Switzerland. To the extent non-resident companies have Swiss sources of income, such as business establishments or real estate, they are also liable for taxation. Conversely, as a unilateral measure to limit double taxation, profits from foreign business establishments or real estate are exempted from taxation.

=== Profit tax ===
A proportional or progressive tax is levied by the Confederation (at a flat rate of 8.5%) and the cantons (at varying rates) on corporate profits. The tax is based on the net profit as accounted for in the corporate income statement, as adjusted for tax purposes. For instance, expenditures that have no business reason such as excessive depreciations, accruals or reserves, as well as disguised dividends are taxed as profits.

A number of provisions limit the double taxation of profits at the corporate level and contribute to Switzerland's tax haven status. To begin with, a "participation exemption" is granted to companies who hold 20 percent or more of the shares of other companies; the amount of tax due on the corresponding profit is reduced in proportion to the percentage of shares held. At the cantonal level only, a "holding privilege" applies to pure holding companies. They are exempt from the cantonal corporate profit tax. Moreover, cantonal law confers a "domicile privilege" on companies who are only administered in Switzerland, but whose business is conducted abroad; including shell corporations. The cantons tax only around 10 percent of the worldwide profits of such companies.

=== Capital tax ===
A proportional tax is levied by the cantons (at varying rates) on the Eigenkapital (ownership equity) of companies. Thinly capitalised companies are taxed, moreover, on the liabilities that function as equity. This also means that debts paid on such liabilities cannot be deducted for purposes of the profit tax, and are subject to the federal withholding tax.

Furthermore, many Cantons levy minimum taxes on capital or a general minimum tax, which means that small companies and non-profitable companies have to pay more taxes percentagewise than larger companies. Cantonal legislators try this way to cover the costs associated with auditing these small companies.

=== Global minimum corporate tax rate ===
Started in 2023, about 200 companies with headquarters in the country and a several thousand subsidiaries of foreign companies would pay the global minimum corporate tax rate. The new rule applies to companies with at least €750 million in annual turnover, which is said to represent only about 1% of the companies based in Switzerland. These rules do not do away with some special regimes in Switzerland that benefit holding companies including tax relief on dividends and capital gains.

== Other federal taxes ==
=== Value added tax ===
The value added tax (VAT; Mehrwertsteuer / Taxe sur la valeur ajoutée / Imposta sul valore aggiunto) is one of the Confederation's principal sources of funding. It is levied at a rate of 8.1 percent on most commercial exchanges of goods and services. Certain exchanges are subject to a reduced VAT of 2.6 percent:

- Foodstuffs (except alcoholic beverages)
- Cattle, poultry, fish
- Seeds, living plants, cut flowers
- Grains
- Animal feed and fertilizer
- Medications
- Newspapers, magazines, books and other printed products without advertising character of the kinds to be stipulated by the Federal Council
- Services of radio and television companies (exception: the normal rate applies for services of a commercial nature)

A special rate of 3.8% is in use in the hotel industry. Yet other exchanges, including those of medical, educational and cultural services, are tax-exempt; as are goods delivered and services provided abroad. The party providing the service or delivering the goods is liable for the payment of the VAT, but the tax is usually passed on to the customer as part of the price.

In 2014 total revenue from VAT was nearly CHF 11 billion (short scale) on CHF 866 billion of taxable sales. In 2013 the revenue and sales were CHF 10.3 billion and 858 billion respectively.

=== Federal withholding tax ===
The federal withholding tax (Verrechnungssteuer / impôt anticipé / Imposta preventiva) is levied on certain forms of income, most notably dividend payments, interest on bank loans and bonds, liquidation proceeds, lottery winnings and payments by life insurances and private pension funds. The debtor of such payments is liable for the payment of the tax; they must pay the creditor only the net amount. The tax rate is 35% for moveable capital revenue and for lottery winnings of 1 million francs or more, 15% for life annuities and pensions and 8% for other insurance benefits.

With respect to creditors resident in Switzerland, the withholding tax is only a means of securing the payment of the income or profit tax, from which the creditor may then deduct the amount already withheld, or request its refund. The same applies to foreign creditors to the extent that a tax treaty provides for it. Other foreign creditors are not eligible for a refund; with respect to them, the withholding tax is a genuine tax.

=== Stamp duties ===
Stamp duties are a group of federal taxes levied on certain commercial transactions. The name is an anachronism and dates back to the time when such taxes were administered with physical stamps. The issue tax (Emissionssteuer / Tassa di emissione) is levied on the issue of certain securities such as shares and bonds. Exceptions are made, inter alia, for securities issued in the course of a commercial reorganization, and the first million CHF of funds raised are in effect exempt from taxation. The tax amounts to one percent of the funds raised and is payable by the issuer. The trade in shell corporations (Mantelhandel) is also subject to the issue tax.

The transfer tax (Umsatzsteuer / Imposta sulla cifra d'affari) is levied on the trade in certain securities by certain qualified traders (Effektenhändler; mostly stockbrokers and large holding companies). The tax amounts to 0.15 or 0.3 percent depending on whether Swiss or foreign securities are traded. Finally, an insurance premiums tax of 5 or 2.5 percent is levied on certain insurance premiums.

=== Custom duties ===
The Confederation can levy customs duties and other duties on the cross-border movement of goods entering the Swiss Customs Area. The rates are almost exclusively based on weight (e.g. CHF X per 100 kg gross). The revenue from customs duties goes into the federal coffers and amounted to approximately CHF 1.13 billion in 2016.

=== Casino tax ===
After the removal of the casino ban from the Constitution in 1993, the Confederation received the power to collect a special tax on the revenue of casinos. The tax may not exceed 80% of the gross gaming revenue and is assigned to the AHV/IV fund.

==== Tax scales ====
Grand casinos holding a type A concession: unlimited bets, unrestricted number of table games and slot machines. Currently, 8 Grand casinos are in operation. The basic tax rate is 40 percent for the first CHF 10 million of gross gaming revenue. For each additional million, the tax rate is increased by 0.5 percent until it reaches the maximum rate of 80 percent.

Casinos holding a type B concession: limited bets, limited selection of table games and limited number of slot machines. Currently, 13 casinos are in operation. The basic tax rate is 40 percent for the first CHF 10 million of gross gaming revenue. For each additional million, the tax rate is increased by 0.5 percent until it reaches the maximum rate of 80 percent.

=== Special consumption taxes ===
The Confederation levies special consumption taxes on the importation or manufacture of tobacco, beer, mineral oil, automobiles and spirits.

=== Military service exemption tax ===
Every Swiss man is required to perform military service (Art. 59 para. 1 Cst). Anyone who, for whatever reason, fails (in whole or in part) to fulfil this duty personally by doing military or civilian service has to pay military service exemption tax.

The exemption tax amounts to CHF 3 per CHF 100 of income liable to tax, but no less than CHF 400. However, it is reduced according to the total number of service days performed by the end of the relevant year. The reduction is one tenth for 50 to 99 military service days (75 to 149 civilian service days), plus another tenth for each set of 50 additional military service days (75 civilian service days) or fractions thereof.

The exemption tax assessment is carried out annually, generally in the year following the relevant year. Only those who have performed the total number of mandatory service days are entitled to a refund of the exemption tax(es) paid. The revenue from military service exemption tax amounted to approximately CHF 174 million in 2016.

== Other cantonal taxes ==
In addition to the taxes mentioned above, the cantons are free to introduce others. Several cantons levy an inheritance tax (Erbschaftssteuer / Imposta di successione) and a gift tax (Schenkungssteuer / Imposta di donazione), although there is a trend towards abolishing those. Moreover, the cantons are required by federal law to levy a tax on the profit from the sale of real estate (Grundstückgewinnsteuer / impôt sur les gains immobiliers / Imposta sugli utili immobiliari). Most also levy a tax on the value of the property sold (Handänderungssteuer / impôt sur les mutations / Tassa di mutazione) so as to discourage speculation in real estate. Taxes are also frequently levied on the ownership of dogs and motor vehicles, on lotteries, on the sale of tickets to public entertainments, or on overnight stays in certain tourist destinations.

=== Casino tax ===
The Confederation levies a tax on gross gaming revenue (the difference between player stakes and payouts) to fund the old-age, survivors', and disability insurance systems. For land-based operations, the base rate is 40% on gross gaming revenue up to 10 million francs, then progressively increases by 0.5% per additional million francs to a maximum of 80%. For online casino games, the base rate is 20% on revenue up to 3 million francs, rising in five steps to a maximum of 80%.

== Tax rates and statistics ==
In 2016, some CHF 183 billion in taxes were levied in Switzerland, of which 65.5 billion was levied by the Confederation, 46 billion by the cantons, 28 billion by the municipalities and 45 billion in form of social security contributions. The overall fiscal rate was 27.8 percent of GDP in 2016. The effective individual tax rate is subject to considerable variation depending on the canton and municipality of residence. For instance, companies subject to ordinary taxation paid between 13 and 25 percent of income tax in 2006, and the maximum individual tax rates in major cities ranged between 12.3 percent in the Canton of Zug and 32.3 percent in the Canton of Jura.

== Tax evasion ==
Depending on the nature of the tax at issue, criminal offences related to the nonpayment of taxes are regulated in substantially different ways by cantonal and federal statutes. The statutes distinguish, however, between tax evasion and tax fraud. The former is classed as a misdemeanour (Übertretung / contravention) and is punishable by a fine of 33% to 300% of the amount of tax evaded. Tax fraud occurs if a tax evasion is committed by using falsified documents for deceptive purposes, a crime (Vergehen / crime) punishable by additional imprisonment of up to three years or an additional fine of up to 30,000 CHF.

Tax evasion in Switzerland was estimated at CHF 66 billion according to a study in 2023. The Convention on Mutual Administrative Assistance in Tax Matters, FATCA and the related amnesty has also encouraged 3% of tax payers to report undeclared funds to the tax authorities, according to the same report.

== See also ==
- Social security in Switzerland
- Value added tax (Switzerland)

== Bibliography ==
- Amonn, Toni (2008). Repetitorium zum Steuerrecht (in German) (3rd. ed.). Berne: Haupt. ISBN 978-3-258-07124-4.
- Locher, Peter; Blumenstein, Ernst (2002). System des schweizerischen Steuerrechts (in German) (6th. ed.). Zürich: Schulthess. ISBN 3-7255-4342-9.
- Mäusli-Allenspach, Peter; Oertli, Mathias (2006). Das schweizerische Steuerrecht: Ein Grundriss mit Beispielen (in German) (4th. ed.). Berne: Cosmos. ISBN 3-85621-171-3.
- Linder, Wolf (2005). Schweizerische Demokratie: Institutionen, Prozesse, Perspektiven (in German) (2nd. ed.). Berne: Haupt. ISBN 978-3-258-06842-8.
