= Social assistance in Switzerland =

Social assistance in Switzerland is the final tier of the Swiss social security system. It acts as a non-contributory, needs-based safety net designed to guarantee a "dignified existence" to any person residing in the country who is unable to support themselves. While the right to assistance in emergencies is enshrined in the Swiss Federal Constitution (Art. 12), the actual implementation, regulation, and funding of social assistance remain primarily the responsibility of the 26 cantons and their respective municipalities.

The system distinguishes between social assistance in a broader sense—which includes upstream benefits like supplementary AHV/IV payments, premium reductions for health insurance, and housing allowances—and social assistance in the narrower sense. The latter refers to the ultimate "bottom" safety net provided when all other private and social insurance resources have been exhausted.

To ensure a level of national consistency despite the decentralized legal structure, most cantons follow the non-binding guidelines issued by the Swiss Conference of Welfare Organisations (SKOS). These guidelines define the "social subsistence level" and set the standards for calculating basic needs, housing costs, and medical care, while increasingly focusing on "workfare" measures aimed at social and professional reintegration.

== Social assistance in the narrower and broader sense ==
Social assistance in the broader sense includes all needs-based benefits as well as social assistance in the narrower sense. Benefits that precede social assistance in the narrower sense are geared to specific risks. Anyone who gets into financial difficulties due to a certain life situation is entitled to it. The upstream required services are diverse and differ depending on the canton. There are basically three groups of required services:

- Benefits that guarantee access to basic state care (training grants, reduced premiums for compulsory health insurance, etc.)
- Benefits that are paid in addition to insufficient or exhausted social security benefits (supplementary benefits for old-age and disability insurance, unemployment benefits, family allowances, etc.)
- Benefits that come into play as a result of a lack of private security (alimony assistance, housing allowances, etc.)

Social assistance in the narrower sense comes into play when a household cannot secure its livelihood despite these benefits. It is a social benefit under public law that has the function of a minimum level of security in the bottom safety net in the social security system. It secures the existence of people in need, promotes their economic and personal independence and supports their social and professional integration. Social assistance makes an active contribution to the prevention of poverty and thus to social peace in Switzerland. The financial benefits of social assistance are based on individual needs and are only paid out if one's own funds are not sufficient and all other assistance is not available or is not available in time. In addition to economic help, social assistance provides personal support within the framework of social counselling. Social assistance is a central pillar of the social security system in Switzerland. It is regulated by law by the cantons and financed from public funds. The cantons are guided by the SKOS guidelines when designing the support services. The public Social assistance is supplemented by private social assistance from aid organizations and other organizations.

The following explanations relate to social assistance in the narrower sense.

== Legal basis ==
=== Federal level ===
==== Fundamental right to help in emergencies (Art. 12 BV) ====
The Swiss Federal Constitution guarantees every person residing in Switzerland the right to help in emergencies. Article 12 BV reads: "Anyone who gets into trouble and is not able to take care of themselves has the right to help and care and to the means that are essential for a dignified existence." The entitlement to secure subsistence laid down in this article forms the most important basis for social assistance at the federal level. However, no statement is made as to what means are necessary for a decent existence. So no subsistence level is justified.

==== Article 115 BV and Competence Act (ZUG) ====
Article 115 of the Federal Constitution is a competence norm that states that the cantons are responsible for supporting those in need. The cantons are constitutionally obliged to regulate and implement social assistance. However, Article 115 also states that the Confederation can regulate responsibility and exceptions. He regulated this in the Competence Act (ZUG) of 1977. The ZUG deals with social assistance law and essentially regulates the obligation to reimburse costs between the cantons (with regard to support residence, canton of residence, home canton, etc.). Furthermore, the responsibility for Swiss nationals with permanent residence abroad, foreigners, refugees or stateless persons is also recorded in the ZUG. In December 2012, the Swiss Parliament decided to amend the jurisdiction law so that the reimbursement obligation of the home canton is abolished.

==== Legislation on social assistance to Swiss nationals abroad ====
The law on social assistance and loans to Swiss nationals abroad is based on Art. 40 of the Federal Constitution and regulates the entitlement to social assistance for people who are resident abroad, have been there for more than three months or have been abroad after at least three years return to Switzerland and are dependent on support.

==== Social assistance to foreigners ====
Foreigners from the European Union and EFTA can only receive social assistance if they have a valid residence permit and have worked in Switzerland for at least one year. In June 2017, the Federal Council dealt with the issue of stricter restrictions on access to social assistance for people who are not citizens of EU or EFTA countries.

==== Legal basis from the asylum area ====
If asylum seekers, temporarily admitted persons, those in need of protection and refugees (during the first 5 or 7 years of residence) or persons with a legally binding expulsion decision are dependent on social assistance benefits, the cantons and municipalities are responsible for paying out the benefits, but the costs will be incurred taken over by the federal government. This also gives the federal government the opportunity to enforce provisions on the payment of social assistance benefits for these groups of people.

=== Cantonal level ===
Each canton has a cantonal social welfare law that has been passed by the respective parliament. The details are regulated by a social assistance regulation. This is issued by the cantonal government. As a result, social welfare law varies from canton to canton. All cantons are based on one or otherwise follow the guidelines of the Swiss Conference for Social Welfare (SKOS).

==== SKOS guidelines ====
The Swiss Conference for Social Welfare (SKOS) is a private-law association and professional association on whose board the cantonal social welfare offices, cities, municipalities and regions as well as private social welfare organizations are represented. The cantons, federal offices, cities, municipalities and private organizations are members of the SKOS.

The SKOS issues guidelines for the calculation method and for determining the individual support budget receipt of social assistance benefits. These are composed of the basic need for subsistence, the housing costs and the basic medical care as well as the situation-related benefits. With the help of an allowance system, special account is taken of the personal integration efforts and the individual life situation. The guidelines also provide information on the crediting of income and assets, on dealing with financial claims against third parties, on the rights and obligations of those receiving social assistance and on conditions, possible sanctions and measures for integration. These guidelines are advisory in nature. They only become legally binding when they are included in cantonal legislation, municipal legislation or case law. Today, however, all cantons follow the SKOS guidelines to varying degrees.

The guidelines are prepared by practitioners. The "Guidelines and Practical Aid (RIP)" commission includes over twenty experts from the field of social assistance and management of social services in larger and smaller communities, cities and in German- and French-speaking Switzerland. Changes in directives are also supported by the “Legal Issues” commission from a legal point of view and the “Social Policy and Social Assistance” commission from a socio-political perspective. The guidelines are adopted by the board of SKOS and the board of the Swiss Conference of Cantonal Social Directors (SODK). Through this mechanism for determining or revising the guidelines ensures that the guidelines are broadly supported.

== Organization of social assistance ==
Responsibility and implementation of social assistance are organized very differently depending on the canton or municipality. It can be organized on a cantonal, regional or municipal level. With the creation of specialized social services at cantonal or regional level or in large municipalities and cities, the professionalization of social assistance will be strengthened. These social services provide material and personal help in emergencies. It can be assumed that today 80–90% of all people in Switzerland live in the catchment area of such a social service.

The social welfare authority also handles appeals against decisions. In the second instance, a cantonal supervisory authority usually deals with it. As a last step, appealing persons can also go to the competent courts.

== Numbers ==
Across Switzerland, 261,983 people received social assistance benefits in 2014. That is 3.2% of the Swiss population. Between 2009 and 2014, the social assistance rate hardly changed. But there are big differences between the cantons. Urban cantons have a higher social assistance rate than rural areas. Young adults, people with a low level of education, single parents and foreigners are particularly dependent on social assistance.

Social assistance rate by age group (2014):

- 00–17 years, 5.2%
- 18–25 years, 3.9%
- 26–35 years, 3.9%
- 36–45 years, 3.6%
- 46–55 years, 3.3%
- 56–64 years, 2.7%
- 65–79 years, 0.2%
- 80+ years, 0.3%

Social assistance rate by nationality (2014):

- Swiss, 2.2%
- Foreigners, 6.3%

Support units by household structure (2014):

- 65.5% of all cases are single-person cases
- 18.6% of all cases concern single parents
- 10.5% of all cases involve couples with children
- 5.3% of all cases involve couples without children

44.2% of all social welfare recipients have no professional training (2014).

For 53.5% of all social assistance dossiers, social assistance was the only source of income. In 27.5% of cases, social assistance had to supplement earned income. If the employment percentage was 90% or more, one speaks of working poor.

== History ==
=== Middle Ages ===
In the Middle Ages, social welfare, then known as welfare for the poor, was a matter for the churches, which distributed alms to the needy. Religious orders ran simple hospitals and hospices where the poor were treated free of charge. In the late Middle Ages, the villages and towns themselves began to maintain such poorhouses.

=== 16th to 19th centuries ===
In 1551, the Diet of the Old Confederation decided that each community or parish should pay for its own poor. This also corresponded to the development in England and France: the poor should stay where they are. It was also felt that the poor should be helped where their needs are known - where they live. If a Swiss was "poor", i.e. in need of support, the home community had to pay for him.

The Diet decided in 1681 that the place of origin of a poor person should pay for their support. This often shifted responsibility for the poor, itinerant and homeless, and in some communities these marginalized groups made up as much as 10% of the population.

The notorious shortage of money only changed in the 18th century, when the communities opened funds from donations and fines in order to have liquid funds available for the poor. At the same time, the principle was often applied that the relatives of those in need had to pay for their support.

The regulation with the place of origin sometimes led to a certain discrimination, since one cannot lose one's place of origin. Acquiring a second or third place of residence was and is only possible through expensive naturalization at the new place of residence. Attempts were sometimes made to stem the increase in the poor with marriage bans, which ended with the constitution of 1874, which prohibited people from being differentiated according to their social situation. However, until the end of the 19th century, welfare dependents received money to emigrate to America. In return, the poor man was declared homeless, so that no Swiss community had to pay for him.

In the second half of the 19th century, the first cantons began to create laws on welfare benefits; In 1920, such regulations finally existed in all Swiss cantons. A decisive change began in 1857, when the Canton of Berne decided that the local municipality, and not the home town, would be responsible for supporting the poor, although at that time 59% of the people still lived in the home town. By 1939, all cantons adopted the place of residence regulation. The home town only has to pay for the subsistence level for people who are obviously homeless and in need.

=== 20th century ===
After the First World War, special training courses were created to train the first social workers. They ran homes for orphans and the handicapped. In 1948, the AHV was introduced, which, together with the IV and the EO, takes over part of the previous welfare for the poor.

== Basic principles of social assistance ==
- Safeguarding human dignity: Social assistance is rooted in the constitutionally protected right to a dignified existence. Its main task is to provide the needy individual with the bare necessities of life and to free them from their specific need in the long term.
- Subsidiarity: Social assistance is granted when the needy are unable to help themselves and when third-party help is not available or not available in time. The person in need of help has the right to a comprehensive assessment of their personal and social situation.
- Individualisation: Social assistance benefits are adjusted to the individual case. Supported persons are not better off materially than unsupported persons who live in modest economic circumstances. The ultimate goal is to ensure the autonomy of those affected with the best possible integration into the professional and social environment.
- Performance and consideration: The granting of social assistance is linked to the cooperation of those seeking help. Efforts in gainful employment or community service are recognized by granting an allowance or allowance.
- Final principle: Social assistance is paid regardless of a reason that led to poverty. The Dictionary of Social Policy defines it this way:

If a service is provided because a need has arisen, one speaks of finality. The reasons that led to this need are irrelevant. The classic final systems include public and private social assistance. Among the social insurances, AHV, IV, EL and occupational pensions are among the final systems. Although they are linked to a specific risk (old age, death, disability), they do not differentiate according to its cause (accident or illness).

— SocialInfo, the dictionary of social policy

== Benefits ==
Social assistance is a need benefit. This means that it is clarified on a case-by-case basis whether a person or household is able to cover its expenses with the funds available. If this is not the case, the household receives social assistance. In the case of shared accommodation, where there is not necessarily a mutual obligation to support, the situations are considered separately. Social assistance provides economic support and, as part of social counseling, personal, i.e. advisory help.

=== Economic social assistance ===
==== Calculation of needs/expenses allowed ====
A household is entitled to an allowance for basic needs. Housing costs for adequate housing and healthcare are paid for separately. There may also be other situational benefits for expenses such as extra family childcare, professional expenses, etc.

According to SKOS guidelines (new amounts from 2022), the allowance for basic needs (CHF (~$1.08)) is:

- 1 person CHF 1,006
- 2 people CHF 1,539
- 3 people CHF 1,871
- 4 people CHF 2,153
- 5 people CHF 2,435
- per additional person CHF 204

The following items of expenditure are to be paid from the basic requirement:

- Food, beverages and tobacco products
- Clothing and shoes
- Energy consumption (electricity, gas, etc.) without additional housing costs
- Ongoing housekeeping (cleaning/maintenance of clothes and apartment) incl
- Small household items
- Health care without deductibles and deductibles (e.g. self-bought medication)
- Transport expenses including half-fare travelcard (local public transport, bike/moped maintenance)
- Messaging (e.g. telephone, mail)
- Entertainment and education (e.g. radio/TV concession, sports, toys, newspapers, books, school fees, cinema, keeping pets)
- Personal care (e.g. hairdresser, toiletries)
- Personal equipment (e.g. writing material)
- Other (e.g. club fees, small gifts, drinks and food taken outside)

Social assistance only pays support for current expenses. Social assistance does not finance the ownership, maintenance and use of cars unless they are used to maintain employment or are necessary for health reasons, such as in the case of mobility problems. Social assistance also does not restructure debt.

In the case of medical treatment, social welfare pays the annual deductible and the deductible from the health insurance company. Uncovered but essential treatment costs are also paid. Dental treatments must be simple, economical and practical. To be on the safe side, a cost estimate must be sent to the competent authority, if possible by registered mail, before the welfare recipient consents to treatment. The authority can have this checked for plausibility by a medical officer who is obliged to maintain medical confidentiality towards the authority, but must bear the costs incurred if the examination ordered by the authority's medical officer was carried out unjustifiably.

Additional expenses for holidays are not paid by social security. Recipients of social assistance can, however, use the support money made available to them relatively autonomously and, to a limited extent, can also make smaller excursions while forgoing other expenses. In special cases, the social service can ask private foundations for contributions to recreational trips.

Further information about what is covered by social assistance and what is not can be found on the SKOS homepage.

==== Crediting of income and assets ====
On the income side of the needs calculation, all available funds are taken into account, i.e. income from work, other social benefits and assets.

An income allowance is granted on the income from work, i.e. part of the income is not taken into account. This amount varies from canton to canton. As a rule, the exempt amount is between 200 and 600 francs.

The assets are to be used up to an asset allowance. This is CHF 4,000 for individuals, CHF 8,000 for couples and CHF 2,000 for one child. Valuables that cannot be dispensed with, real estate, expensive cars and the like must be sold in order to be able to live on one's own capital for as long as possible. Financial claims against third parties (daily allowances, alimony, etc.) must be claimed by the recipient of social assistance.

If there is an entitlement to social assistance, relatives' support can be requested from relatives in ascending and descending relationships. Siblings are not subject to support, but spouses are. Support for relatives is regulated in Articles 328 and 329 of the Civil Code (ZGB). Since the revision of the SKOS guidelines in December 2008, a higher standard of living for the relatives has been a prerequisite for this claim – based on a federal court decision. The SKOS recommends an income limit of CHF 10,000 per month for individuals and CHF 15,000 for married couples. The asset allowance is recommended at CHF 250,000 or CHF 500,000. Relative support is applied very differently in the cantons.

=== Personal social assistance ===
The aim of social counseling is to work with people who are threatened or affected by temporary or permanent social exclusion to regain access to the various functional systems of society. With methods such as the empowerment approach, social work attempts to enable those on social assistance to lead as self-determined a life as possible. The social workers proceed in a resource-oriented manner and see their clients as autonomous, reflective people. professional integration in the foreground, but great attention should also be paid to social or societal integration, because in this way, in addition to protecting human dignity, consequential damage for those affected and the public sector can be limited. And it is not uncommon for social integration to be the first step towards professional integration.

Today's social assistance is an activating one. By means of offers and incentives, social assistance recipients are to be motivated to work and integrate. The SKOS guidelines provide incentives for employed people receiving social assistance or for those who are particularly concerned about their professional and social integration. If people on social assistance take up gainful employment or extend their current professional activity, they receive an income allowance on their wage income > The integration allowances are also available for non-employed people who provide benefits for professional and social integration.

== Rights and obligations of social assistance recipients ==
Social assistance recipients have rights and obligations that can be derived from the objectives and basic principles of social assistance.

The person concerned has the right that their civil legal capacity and capacity to act is not restricted. The supported person also has a right to be heard and to inspect files. Furthermore, the decisions of the social welfare bodies must be made in writing and justified. Ultimately, those affected have the right to be given the opportunity to improve their situation independently.

One of the obligations of those receiving social assistance is to provide truthful information about their income, assets and family circumstances when clarifying their need. Any changes in financial and personal circumstances must be reported. If possible, people on social assistance must also contribute to alleviating their hardship. This includes in particular the obligation to look for or take up reasonable employment and to participate in social and professional integration measures as well as the obligation to assert third-party claims.

=== Sanctions ===
If these obligations are culpably violated, the basic requirement for subsistence can be reduced or canceled by a maximum of 30 percent as well as allowances for benefits (income allowance and integration allowances). Reductions must be proportionate and be made in a contestable form.

In practice, many bureaucratic hurdles can block access to social assistance for people living in poverty, especially for people with chronic illness and/or mental health problems. In the case of the latter, it is not uncommon for sexual exploitation or drug use or both to be a major contributory cause. The fulfillment of official requirements requires a minimal ability on the part of those affected to be able to fulfill them. If this is not the case, their destiny turns in a fateful downward spiral. These people need intensive support in order to get out again.

=== Reimbursement of service ===
When it comes to the reimbursement of social assistance benefits, a distinction must be made between benefits received legally and benefits received illegally.

If the financial situation of (former) recipients of social assistance improves significantly, lawfully received social assistance benefits can be reclaimed from the public sector. To what extent and to what extent such reimbursements are requested depends heavily on cantonal legislation.

If someone has received welfare benefits illegally or has not used them correctly, they must also repay them. In particular, if someone works and earns money while receiving social assistance, they must declare this income to the social welfare authority; so the services can be adjusted. Anyone who fraudulently fails to comply with these obligations risks being reported for fraud.

==== Acknowledgment of debt ====
Even if a formerly needy person has not accumulated wealth to pay back social security benefits, but is just making ends meet, complaints are increasing that some municipalities are starting to do so - increasingly in the canton of St. Gallen - so-called debt acknowledgment to have it signed so that a municipality can initiate the operation more easily. This is contrary to the intention of the legislature, which stipulates that people who have been supported once should not be burdened with lifelong debts to the relevant authority. It is advised not to sign such acknowledgments of debt and to file a legal proposal if a debt enforcement procedure is initiated.

With an acknowledgment of debt, a municipality aims to interrupt the maximum 15-year reimbursement obligation recognized in most cantons and thus start it all over again.

=== Work fare ===
In order to counteract the paradigm shift to Welfare-to-work (Workfare) in Switzerland too, since the revision of the SKOS guidelines in 2005 at the latest in Switzerland too, «material security in the event of imminent poverty has been systematically linked to the condition that On the part of those receiving social benefits, so-called consideration is provided wherever possible, i.e. somehow defined work has to be done.

==== Social firms ====
Recipients are obliged to participate in workfare programs regardless of their employable state of health. These (relatively simple) activities often include a. the utilization of raw materials (e.g. computer parts), sewing orders, housekeeping (laundry and kitchen), office work (such as administration of that company, artificial reproduction of customer orders) or IT tasks (for further training) or customer orders. Social welfare recipients are — like generally unemployment benefit recipients and IV benefit recipients — depending on their physical and mental condition such work in appropriate workshops, offices or internal staff restaurants in state institutions (as a "second job market" not for profit) or under private law (usually profit-oriented as companies operating in the «primary labor market) organized "social companies". Such a social company usually includes training when looking for a job and career advice.

== See also ==
- Social security in Switzerland

== Sources ==
- Anne-Lise Head-King, Thierry Christ: "Caring" in German, French and Italian in the online Historical Dictionary of Switzerland., October 18, 2005 version

== Literature ==
- Ruedi Epple, Eva Schär: "Founders, Cities, States." Seismo Verlag, Zurich 2010, ISBN 978-3-03777-088-7.
- Gisela Hauss, Béatrice Ziegler: "Help, educate, manage." Seismo Verlag, Zurich 2010, ISBN 978-3-03777-078-8.
- Peter Neuenschwander, Oliver Hümbelin, Marc Kalbermatter, Rosmarie Ruder: The hard walk to social service. Seismo Verlag, Zurich 2012, ISBN 978-3-03777-124-2.
- Claudia Hänzi: The guidelines of the Swiss Conference for Social Welfare. Helbling Lichtenhahn Verlag, Basel 2011, ISBN 978-3-7190-3086-5.
- Robert Fluder, Jürgen Stremlow: Poverty and need. Challenges for municipal social services. Berne: Haupt Verlag, 1999.
- Andreas Huwiler: Design of social assistance. Edition Soziothek, Bern 2008, ISBN 978-3-03796-408-8 (PDF file) free of charge http://www.soziothek.ch/ausgestaltung-der-sozialhilfe
- Guido Wizent: The need for social assistance. A handbook, Zurich/ St. Gallen 2014.
- Guido Wizent: Social Welfare Law, Zurich/St. Gallen 2020
