= Federal Social Insurance Office =

Swiss government agency

- (in German) Bundesamt für Sozialversicherungen (in French) Office fédéral des assurances sociales (in Italian) Ufficio federale delle assicurazioni sociali

Agency overview
- Jurisdiction: Federal administration of Switzerland
- Headquarters: Bern
- Employees: 340
- Minister responsible: Alain Berset, Federal Councillor
- Parent agency: Federal Department of Home Affairs
- Website: bsv.admin.ch

The Federal Social Insurance Office (FSIO) (Note: German: Bundesamt für Sozialversicherungen, BSV, French: Office fédéral des assurances sociales, OFAS, Italian: Ufficio federale delle assicurazioni sociali, UFAS) is the federal office responsible for social insurance in Switzerland. It is subordinated to the Federal Department of Home Affairs.

It regulates the Swiss social insurance and system, including old age and survivors' insurance, invalidity insurance, supplementary benefits, occupational pension funds, income compensation for people on national service and for women on maternity leave as well as family allowances in the agricultural sector.

== Health insurance premium index ==
The Health insurance premium index is compiled by the Federal Social Insurance Office (for the basic health insurance) and by the Federal Statistical Office (for the field of supplementary insurances). It aggregates data on the evolution of premiums for compulsory and complementary health insurance and is the weighted average of the two sub-indices. By means of the Health insurance premium index, the effects of the evolution of premiums on the growth of households' disposable income can be calculated.

The legal basis of the Health Insurance Premium Index is the Federal Statistics Act of 9 October 1992 (BStatG) and the Ordinance of 30 June 1993 on the Conduct of Statistical Surveys by the Confederation. The Health insurance premium index is calculated based on an online (email) sample survey. For the basic health insurance a full survey is conducted and for the supplementary insurance the biggest providers, which account for about 70% of the total market, are surveyed. Participation in the survey is compulsory. The survey covers health insurance premiums for the basic and supplementary insurance areas. The annual premium for new basic insurance policies and the supplementary hospital insurances are covered by canton and age category. The Health insurance premium index has been compiled every year from October to November since 1999.

== Full-time positions since 2001 ==
Raw data

"Federal Finance Administration FFA: State financial statements".
"Federal Finance Administration FFA: Data portal".

== See also ==
Old-age and survivors insurance in Switzerland
