= Pension system in Switzerland =

Overview of pensions in Switzerland

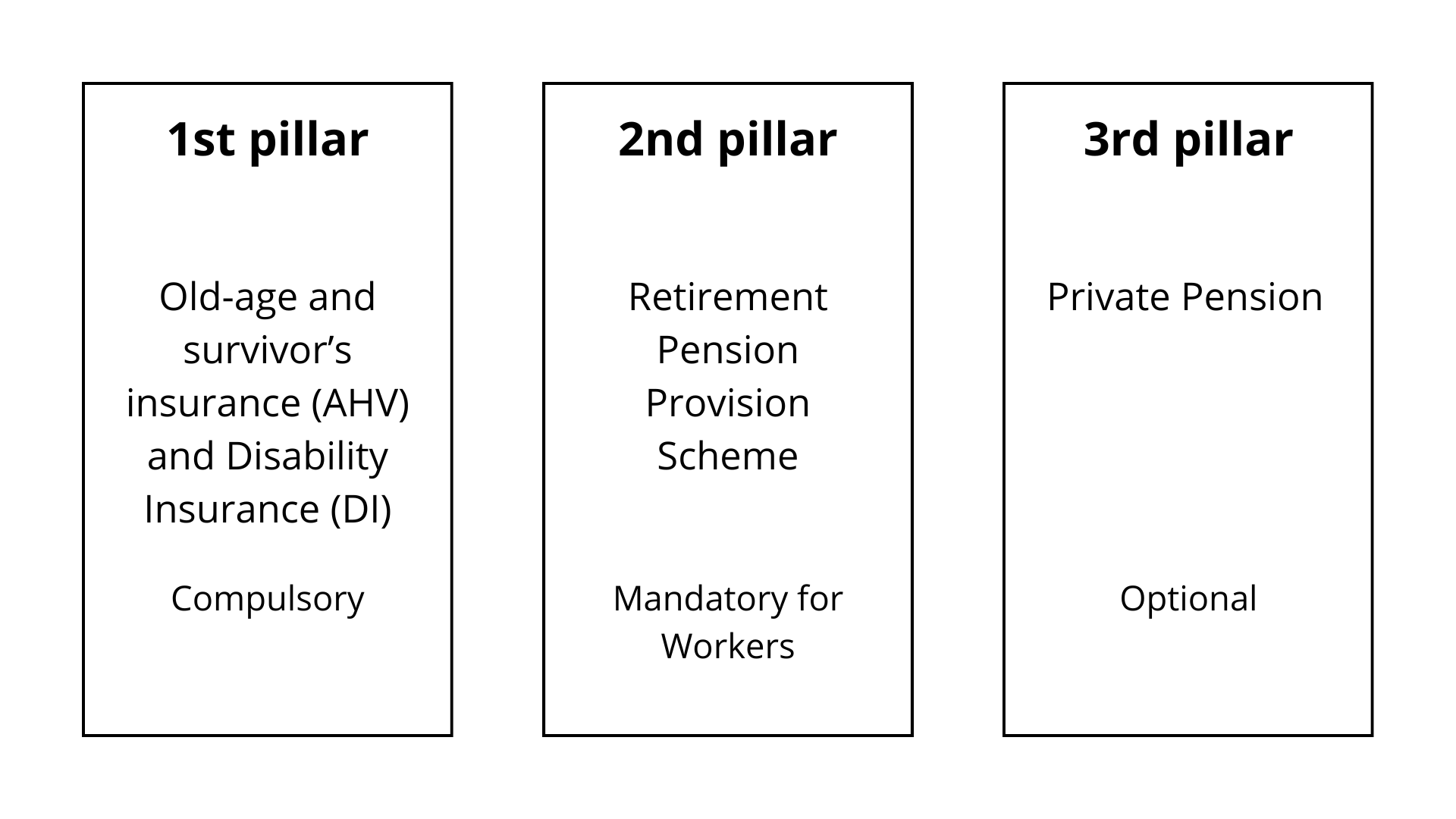
The three pillars of the Swiss pension system: 1. State pension : old-age and survivors insurance (OASI) and disability insurance (DI); 3. Occupational pension (pension funds); 3. Private pension (banks).

The Swiss pension system rests on three pillars:

1. the state-run pension scheme for the aged, orphans, and surviving spouses (old-age and survivors insurance);
2. the pension funds run by investment foundations, which are tied to employers (occupational benefit plans);
3. voluntary, private investments.

== Overview ==
Pillar	How is it financed?	How is it paid out?	Requirements for payouts	Payouts in case of premature death?
1st	Pay-as-you-go system: By all people working and/or living in Switzerland, plus VAT and other taxes (e.g. tobacco and gambling)	Monthly annuity	Reaching the legal age of pension, but may be anticipated or postponed by five years	Only for widows, widowers, and orphans
2nd	Pension fund. Compulsory contributions by employees and employers, and voluntary contributions by self-employed persons	Monthly annuity	As above^{†}	Depends on the pension fund: None; pension for widows, widowers, and orphans; life insurance in case of premature death; full payout to legal heirs
3rd	Pension fund or endowment policy insurance with tax benefits. Voluntary contributions by all people with an income	One-time payout	As above^{†}	Full payout to legal heirs, or according to the insurance policy

^{†}Funds paid into the 2nd and 3rd pillar may be paid out before without retiring when certain criteria are met.

== First pillar ==
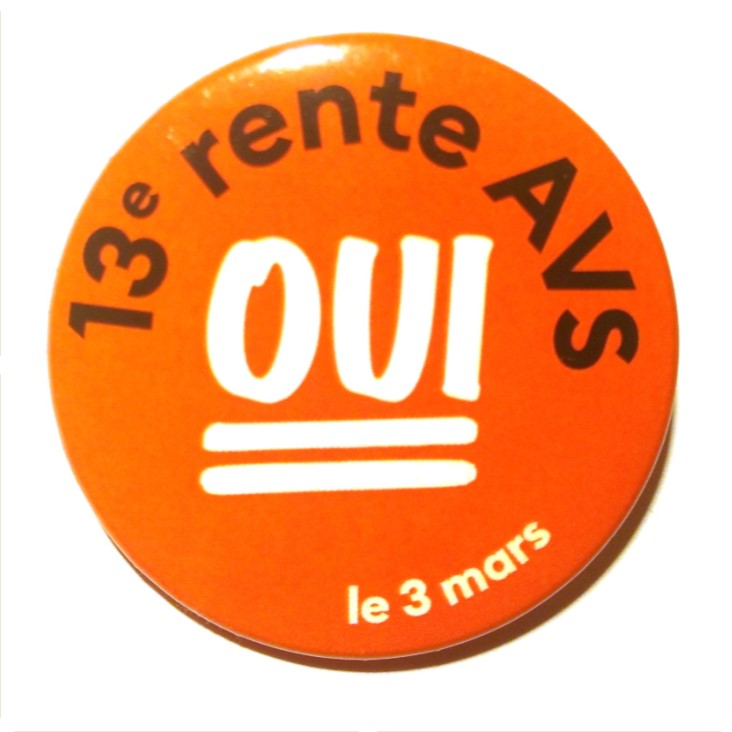
Button of the Swiss initiative for a 13th monthly pension payment

The basic pension insurance is the old-age and survivor's insurance (OASI). It is known as Alters- und Hinterlassenenversicherung (AHV) in German, Assurance vieillesse et survivants (AVS) in French, and Assicurazione vecchiaia, superstiti e invalidità (AVS) in Italian.

According to article 112 of the Swiss federal Constitution, the first pillar should cover basic living expenses adequately. It is a PAYGO system, financed by contributions from employees and employers (4.2% of the employee's income each), from the self-employed (7.8% of their income), and from the people not engaged in paid employment (between 392 and 19600 CHF a year in 2013). The authorities also contribute via direct funding, VAT, and revenues from tax on gambling clubs. People's contributions are collected and benefits are distributed by different bodies, some managed by the cantonal or federal authorities, some managed by union of employers, like the Fédération des Entreprises Romandes Genève.

The first pillar provides old age pensions as well as benefits for widowers and orphans.

The ordinary age of retirement is 65 years for men, 64 for women. It can be anticipated or postponed, with anticipation leading to decreased annuities, and postponement to increased annuities.

=== Payouts ===
While money paid into the first pillar does not have an upper limit (as it is a percentage of the income), the payout is determined by the number of years worked in Switzerland, and the average income. A correction factor takes inflation into account. For a full pension (which is between 1175 and 2350 CHF per month), it is required that the insured person pays into the 1st pillar every year from age 20 to 65 (or 64 for females). Each year spent abroad will reduce the pension by about 2.3 percent. To enjoy the maximum pension (which is 2350 CHF/month), the insured person must have earned, on average, at least 84,600 CHF per year.

The federal constitution stipulates that the 1st pillar must meet the basic needs of the insured people. Because of the rise in living costs, in 1966 the federal parliament enacted additional pension payments. They are flexible and cover actual costs (e.g. health insurance, nursing home costs).

Anticipating the retirement will reduce the monthly pension, while continuing to work will increase it:

-2 years	-13.6%
-1 year	-6.8%
retirement at the legal pension age	+0%
+1 year	+5.2%
+5 years	+33%

== Second pillar ==
The occupational pension scheme is known as Berufliche Vorsorge in German, Prévoyance professionnelle in French, and Previdenza professionale in Italian. In daily life, it is more often referred to as “the second pillar” (German: die Zweite Säule, French: le deuxième pilier, Italian: il secondo pilastro).

According to article 113 of the Swiss federal Constitution, “the occupational pension scheme, together with the Old-age, Survivors' and Invalidity Insurance, enables the insured person to maintain his or her previous lifestyle in an appropriate manner”.

It is a funded pension plan. It is compulsory for employees and is financed by both employees and employers. The sum of the contributions of the employer should be at least equal to the sum of the contributions of his employees.

It is also opened to the self-employed on a voluntary basis. The contributions differ according to the regulations of the institutions providing it. Pension funds are organised as foundations, which then invest in real estate, government bonds, and company shares. They can be created by authorities or private corporations for their own personnel, by private companies, like insurance companies, and be opened to any company, or by trade unions, professional associations, or unions of employers, like the Fédération des Entreprises Romandes Genève, for their members.

The second pillar offers old age pensions. Some of the pension funds also provide benefits in case of disability and to the next of kin in case of premature death. The funds in the second pillar can be used before retirement to buy a principal home, to start an independent activity, or when leaving Switzerland permanently. When changing employment, funds are transferred to the pension fund of the new employer. When unemployed, the funds are transferred into a savings account (so-called Freizügigkeitskonto in German, compte de libre-passage in French, and conto di libero passaggio in Italian). When the person resumes working, the savings can be transferred into the pension fund of the new employer.

== Third pillar ==
The third pillar consists of private pension schemes provided by the private sector. They are optional and financed entirely by the insured person. So-called 3a schemes lead to less taxation and are regulated, while 3b are unregulated, and do not have any benefits regarding taxation.

=== 3a ===
There are two schemes of pensions:

- insurances: An insurance contract is formed between an insurance and the insured person. The product depends on the insurance; but the schemes often offer, in addition to a guaranteed capital when retiring:
  - life insurance
  - disability pension (additional to state disability pension)
  - coverage of regular deposits into pillars 2 and 3 in case of disability
- savings accounts or investment fund accounts: The person can, within some limits, freely choose the amount of money to be paid into the scheme. They are either savings accounts, or investment funds.

Currently (2024), each employed person can pay up to 7056 CHF into 3a schemes every year. Freelance workers (who do not have to pay into the 2nd pillar) can invest up to 20% of their yearly income, but not more than 34128 CHF in a single year. It is legal to invest in several 3a schemes at the same time. In any case, the amount paid into all 3a schemes cannot exceed the yearly gross income.

Because both schemes lead to reduced income and property taxes, the funds can, similar to those of pillar 2, only be paid out in very limited circumstances:

- five years before the legal age of pension (which is 65 years for males, and 64 for females); so the pension will be paid out at age 60/59 at the earliest.
- leaving Switzerland permanently
- repayment of existing mortgages
- buying property which is used by the insured person himself
- starting a business/founding an enterprise
- disability
- death

As the 3a funds can only be dissolved at once (and not as a yearly or monthly annuity), it is advised to open several 3a schemes whose funds can be used independently, step by step, as financial needs arise. And then, funds in 3a accounts can not be split, but only transferred as a whole to another 3a account.

If the insured person continues working beyond the age of pension, he or she can invest into the 3rd pillar up to the age of 70 or 69, respectively. After that age, the funds will be paid out compulsorily.

=== 3b ===
Officially, 3b schemes do not exist, but in banking/investment parlance, any investments which are intended to fund retirement are called "3b scheme". They do not offer any taxation benefits, and are not regulated in the way 3a investments are.

== Issues ==
=== Unemployment and social welfare ===
Persons receiving unemployment benefits still have to pay into the 1st pillar. When unemployment pay has run out, and the person is supported with social welfare payments, he or she is required to dissolve pension funds and retire early (if possible due to age constraints), even if it leads to massive and life-long cuts in 1st pillar pensions. These cuts then may have to be recouped by state-funded Ergänzungsleistungen (prestations complémentaires) in order to guarantee a life in dignity.

=== Living abroad ===
1st pillar funds will be paid as usual, in monthly annuities, to people retiring in a foreign country. There is no adjustment for differing standards of life or purchasing power – so somebody retiring to Thailand, for example, will receive the same amount in Swiss francs as he would retire in Switzerland.

2nd and 3rd pillar funds will be paid out at once upon leaving Switzerland. This has led to issues with people using up their funds abroad, and then receiving the above-mentioned Ergänzungsleistungen upon returning to Switzerland. In comparison, somebody staying in Switzerland usually cannot receive his 2nd/3rd pillar funds, and when he enters the retirement age, he is required to use up his own funds before requesting Ergänzungsleistungen. To be eligible for Ergänzungsleistungen benefits, one needs to be a legal resident of Switzerland, and needs to have paid into the 1st pillar for single year.

=== Demographic change and future evolution ===
At the time, due to the Baby boom generation entering the pension age and the risen life expectancy, financing 1st pillar pensions is a problem. In the current workforce, there are fears their 1st pillar pensions will not suffice to retire while keeping their standard of life.

The number of pensioners is increasing and the investment earnings is shrinking. As life expectancy rises, pensioners are drawing their pensions for longer and longer.

The Federal authorities have put forward a global reform scheme (called Prévoyance 2020 in French, Altervorsorge 2020 in German and Previdenza per la vecchiaia in Italian) encompassing the first and the second pillar. It aims at consolidating the system as well as at making the retirement age more flexible. The federal authorities propose to

- Raise the reference retirement age for women to 65;
- Allow for more flexibility in the age at which one can retire;
- Ensure additional funding through the VAT and federal-state funding;
- Lower the rate with which the capital accumulated by a person in his second pillar is transformed into a pension (i.e. one would get a lower pension for the same capital);
- Take corrective measures to ensure that pensions of the second pillar don't shrink;
- Raise the 1st pillar monthly payments by 70 CHF.

The project had been accepted by a narrow margin at the parliament, but eventually failed to be approved after a citizen referendum held on September 24, 2017 rejected it.

== International comparison ==
The Swiss pension system was ranked fifth best in the world in a study released by the University of Melbourne and Mercer in 2014, after the Danish, the Dutch, the Australian and the Swedish ones. Yet, its rankings has steadiliy declined in diverse rankings, these last years, for lack of ambitious reforms. It is 23rd out of 70 in the Global Pension Report 2020" published by Allianz

== See also ==
- Social security in Switzerland
- Old-age and survivors insurance in Switzerland
