= Federal Office for Food Safety and Veterinary Affairs =

Swiss government agency

- (in German) Bundesamt für Lebensmittelsicherheit und Veterinärwesen (in French) Office fédéral de la sécurité alimentaire et des affaires vétérinaires (in Italian) Ufficio federale della sicurezza alimentare e di veterinaria

Agency overview
- Jurisdiction: Federal administration of Switzerland
- Headquarters: Bern
- Employees: 250
- Minister responsible: Alain Berset, Federal Councillor
- Parent agency: Federal Department of Home Affairs
- Website: blv.admin.ch

The Federal Office for Food Safety and Veterinary Affairs (FSVO) (Note: German: Bundesamt für Lebensmittelsicherheit und Veterinärwesen, BLV, French: Office fédéral de la sécurité alimentaire et des affaires vétérinaires, OSAV, Italian: Ufficio federale della sicurezza alimentare e di veterinaria, USAV) is the federal office responsible for ensuring food safety and protecting animal health and welfare in Switzerland. It is subordinated to the Federal Department of Home Affairs.

It was created in 2014 as a merger between the Federal Veterinary Office and the Food Safety division of the Federal Office of Public Health.

== Full-time positions since 2014 ==
Raw data

Source: "Federal Finance Administration FFA: Data portal".
