= Federal Department of Home Affairs =

Swiss government department

- (in German) Eidgenössisches Departement des Innern (in French) Département fédéral de l'intérieur (in Italian) Dipartimento federale dell'interno (in Romansh) Departament federal da l'intern

Agency overview
- Formed: 1848; 178 years ago
- Jurisdiction: Federal administration of Switzerland
- Headquarters: Bern
- Employees: 2,809
- Annual budget: Expenditure: CHF 17.5 billion Revenue: CHF 130.9 million (2009)
- Minister responsible: Élisabeth Baume-Schneider, Federal Councillor
- Child agencies: Federal Office for Gender Equality; Federal Office of Culture; Swiss Federal Archives; MeteoSwiss; Federal Office of Public Health; Federal Statistical Office; Federal Social Insurance Office; Federal Office for Food Safety and Veterinary Affairs; Swiss National Library; Swissmedic; Swiss National Museum; Pro Helvetia; Occupational Pension Supervisory Commission
- Website: www.edi.admin.ch

The Federal Department of Home Affairs (FDHA, German: Eidgenössisches Departement des Innern, French: Département fédéral de l'intérieur, Italian: Dipartimento federale dell'interno, Romansh: Departament federal da l'intern) is a department of the federal administration of Switzerland. Since 2024, it is headed by Federal Councillor Élisabeth Baume-Schneider.

== Official names ==
- 1848: Department of Home Affairs
- 1979: Federal Department of Home Affairs

== Organisation ==
Like the other federal departments, the FDHA is composed of a General Secretariat, several Federal Offices, and a number of other and affiliated administrative entities.

=== General Secretariat ===
The General Secretariat is responsible for planning, coordination and controlling, and coordinates the decision-making process between the federal offices and the Head of Department. It provides consultancy services for the entire department. Its legal service is also responsible for supervising charitable foundations. The Federal Commission against Racism, the Service for Combating Racism and the Office for the Equality of People with Disabilities are also affiliated to the General Secretariat. It has a staff of 62, annual revenues of CHF 1 million and annual expenditures of CHF 36 million.

=== Federal Offices ===
==== Federal Office for Gender Equality ====
The FOGE's main concern are equal rights in the workplace and at home. For 2008, the FOGE declares its priorities to be equal pay, prevention of sexual harassment in the workplace, striking a balance between the requirements of professional and family life and prevention of domestic violence. The Secretariat of the Federal Commission for Women’s Issues is also affiliated to this office. As of 2023, the FOGE is led by Director Sylvie Durrer, with a staff of 18 full-time equivalents.

==== Federal Office of Culture ====
The Federal Office of Culture is active in the areas of cultural promotion and awareness, cultural heritage and the conservation of historic buildings and monuments. It looks after the federal art collection, operates the Swiss National Library with the Swiss Literary Archives and the Graphic Collection, the National Museums and the Confederation’s valuable collections. The FOC also supports the arts, design and film-making and promotes the concerns of linguistic and cultural minorities. It is the contact point for queries regarding looted art and the transfer of cultural goods. As of 2008, the FOC is led by Director Jean-Frédéric Jauslin. It has a staff of 220, annual revenues of CHF 4 million and annual expenditures of CHF 202 million.

==== Swiss Federal Archives ====
The Swiss Federal Archives are charged with evaluating, safeguarding, cataloguing and raising public awareness of the Confederation’s official documents, which amount to 11.4 terabytes of information as of 2008, or to a bookshelf over 50 kilometres long. The inventory includes original documents such as the Swiss Constitution, deeds, photos, films, recordings and databases. As of 2008, the SFA are led by Director Andreas Kellerhals. They have a staff of 47, no revenues and annual expenditures of CHF 16 million.

==== Federal Office of Meteorology and Climatology ====
MeteoSwiss issues weather forecasts and warnings in the event of bad weather conditions. It gives information on the dangers to disaster protection units, the media and the general public. MeteoSwiss also operates telemetry ground stations, rainfall radars and remote sensing instruments at over 700 locations. Weather models use this data to calculate forecasts up to ten days in advance. As a federal office with an autonomous budget ("FLAG office"), MeteoSwiss sells customised forecasts to businesses and private individuals. As of 2008, MeteoSwiss is led by Director Daniel K. Keuerleber-Burk. It has a staff of 273, annual revenues of CHF 36 million and annual expenditures of CHF 79 million.

==== Federal Office of Public Health ====
The stated aim of the Federal Office of Public Health is to promote and maintain the health of all people living in Switzerland. It seeks to increase awareness of health-related matters so that people can take responsibility for their own health. It also aims at a general improvement in people’s health through disease prevention and health protection campaigns and by curing illnesses and alleviating suffering caused by disease and accidents. The FOPH is charged with tackling issues such as epidemiology and infectious diseases, substance abuse and drug prevention, food safety, noise and radiation protection, assessment and monitoring of chemicals and toxic products, stem cell research and bioterrorism, and health and accident insurance. The FOPH is led by Director Pascal Strupler. It has a staff of 581 and has an annual budget of CHF 207 million.

==== Federal Statistical Office ====
The Federal Statistical Office collects and publishes statistical information on the situation and trends in Switzerland in many different areas of life. It produces publications such as the Statistical Yearbook and the Pocket Statistics, as well as making information available through an internet portal. Since 2009, the FSO is led by Director Jürg Marti. It has a staff of 509, annual revenues of CHF 1 million and annual expenditures of CHF 142 million.

==== Federal Social Insurance Office ====
The Confederation spends around one quarter of the federal budget on social welfare. In the 2000s this amounted to between CHF 13 and 14 billion. The FSIO is charged with ensuring the reliability of this social insurance system within its areas of responsibility: old age and survivors’ insurance (AHV), invalidity insurance (IV), supplementary benefits, occupational pension funds, compensation for loss of earnings for people on national service and women on maternity leave, and family allowances in the agricultural sector. As of 2008, the FSIO is led by Director Yves Rossier. It has a staff of 243, annual revenues of CHF 475 million and annual expenditures of CHF 11,921 million.

==== Federal Office for Food Safety and Veterinary Affairs ====
The Federal Food Safety and Veterinary Office (FSVO) was created in 2014 as a merger between the Federal Veterinary Office and the Food Safety division of the Federal Office of Public Health.

It is responsible for ensuring food safety "from the stable to the plate", as well as protecting animal health and welfare.

=== Administratively attached entities ===
==== Swiss National Library ====
The Swiss National Library’s task is to collect, preserve, catalogue and make available all printed and electronic publications relating to Switzerland. In addition, the NL also houses a series of special collections, the most important being the Swiss Literary Archives and the Graphic Collection. The Dürrenmatt Centre in Neuchâtel is also part of the Swiss National Library. As of 2008, the NL is led by Director Marie-Christine Doffey. It has a staff of 126, no revenues and annual expenditures of CHF 34 million.

==== Swiss Agency for Therapeutic Products Swissmedic ====
Swissmedic is the central Swiss supervisory authority for drugs and other therapeutic products. It is an independent public institution, governed by an Agency Council elected by the Federal Council and administratively affiliated to the FDHA. As of 2008, Swissmedic is led by Director Jürg Schnetzer. It has a staff of 284, annual revenues of CHF 71.5 million and annual expenditures of CHF 67 million.

==== Swiss National Museum ====
The Swiss National Museum is the umbrella organisation for three museums - the National Museum in Zurich, the Prangins Castle and the Swiss National Museum in Schwyz, as well as the Collection Centre in Affoltern am Albis.

==== Pro Helvetia foundation ====
Promotes artistic creation and cultural exchanges in Switzerland.

==== Occupational Pension Supervisory Commission (OPSC) ====
Independent decision-making commission ensuring "the application of consistent supervisory practices within the occupational benefits system" and overseeing "the eight regional authorities responsible for direct supervision".

=== Former entities ===
The previously existing State Secretariat for Education and Research (SER) was merged with Federal Office for Professional Education and Technology (OPET, part of the Federal Department of Economic Affairs) on 20 December 2012, and formed State Secretariat for Education, Research and Innovation (SERI), that began its activities on 1 January 2013 as a part of Federal Department of Economic Affairs, Education and Research.

== List of heads of department ==
Years	Member of the Swiss Federal Council
1848–1857	Stefano Franscini
1857–1863	Giovanni Battista Pioda
1864	Karl Schenk
1865	Jakob Dubs
1866–1870	Karl Schenk
1871–1872	Jakob Dubs
1872–1873	Karl Schenk
1874–1875	Melchior Josef Martin Knüsel
1876–1878	Numa Droz
1879–1884	Karl Schenk
1885	Adolf Deucher
1886–1895	Karl Schenk
1895–1897	Eugène Ruffy
1898–1899	Adrien Lachenal
1900–1903	Marc-Émile Ruchet
1904–1905	Ludwig Forrer
1906–1910	Marc-Émile Ruchet
1911	Josef Anton Schobinger

Years	Member of the Swiss Federal Council
1912	Marc-Émile Ruchet
1912	Camille Decoppet
1913	Louis Perrier
1913–1917	Felix Calonder
1918–1919	Gustave Ador
1920–1928	Ernest Chuard
1929	Marcel Pilet-Golaz
1930–1934	Albert Meyer
1934–1959	Philipp Etter
1960–1973	Hans-Peter Tschudi
1974–1982	Hans Hürlimann
1983–1986	Alphons Egli
1987–1993	Flavio Cotti
1994–2002	Ruth Dreifuss
2003–2009	Pascal Couchepin
2009–2011	Didier Burkhalter
2012–2023	Alain Berset
2024–present	Élisabeth Baume-Schneider

== Full-time positions since 2001 ==
Raw data

"Federal Finance Administration FFA: State financial statements".
"Federal Finance Administration FFA: Data portal".

== See also ==
- Social security in Switzerland
- Federal administration of Switzerland
