= Fédération des Entreprises Romandes Genève =

Fédération des Entreprises Romandes Genève (FER Genève)
- Formation: 1929
- Type: Union of employers
- Headquarters: 98, rue de Saint-Jean, 1201 Genève
- Location: Geneva, Switzerland
- President: Ivan Slatkine
- Key people: Arnaud Burgin General Director

The Fédération des Entreprises Romandes Genève (FER Genève) is a Swiss (Romand designates Swiss cantons where people speak French) employer's organization based in Geneva, Switzerland. It groups 28,000 members, including multinational corporations as well as 9,000 independent workers and 80 trade associations. It is involved in negotiations with the trade unions, political lobbying and the provision of services and business networking opportunities for its members.

It publishes a bimonthly newspaper, Entreprise romande.

The FER Genève operates two institutions active in the Swiss pension system: CIAM-AVS (active in the first pillar of the system) and the CIEPP (active in the second pillar).

== Management ==
Philippe Fleury is the Director and Ivan Slatkine the President.

== Sources ==
- Pierre Cormon, Histoire de la FER Genève, Editions de la Fédération des Entreprises Romande Genève, 2023, ISBN 978-2-940087-53-2
