= Johann Hirter =

Swiss politician

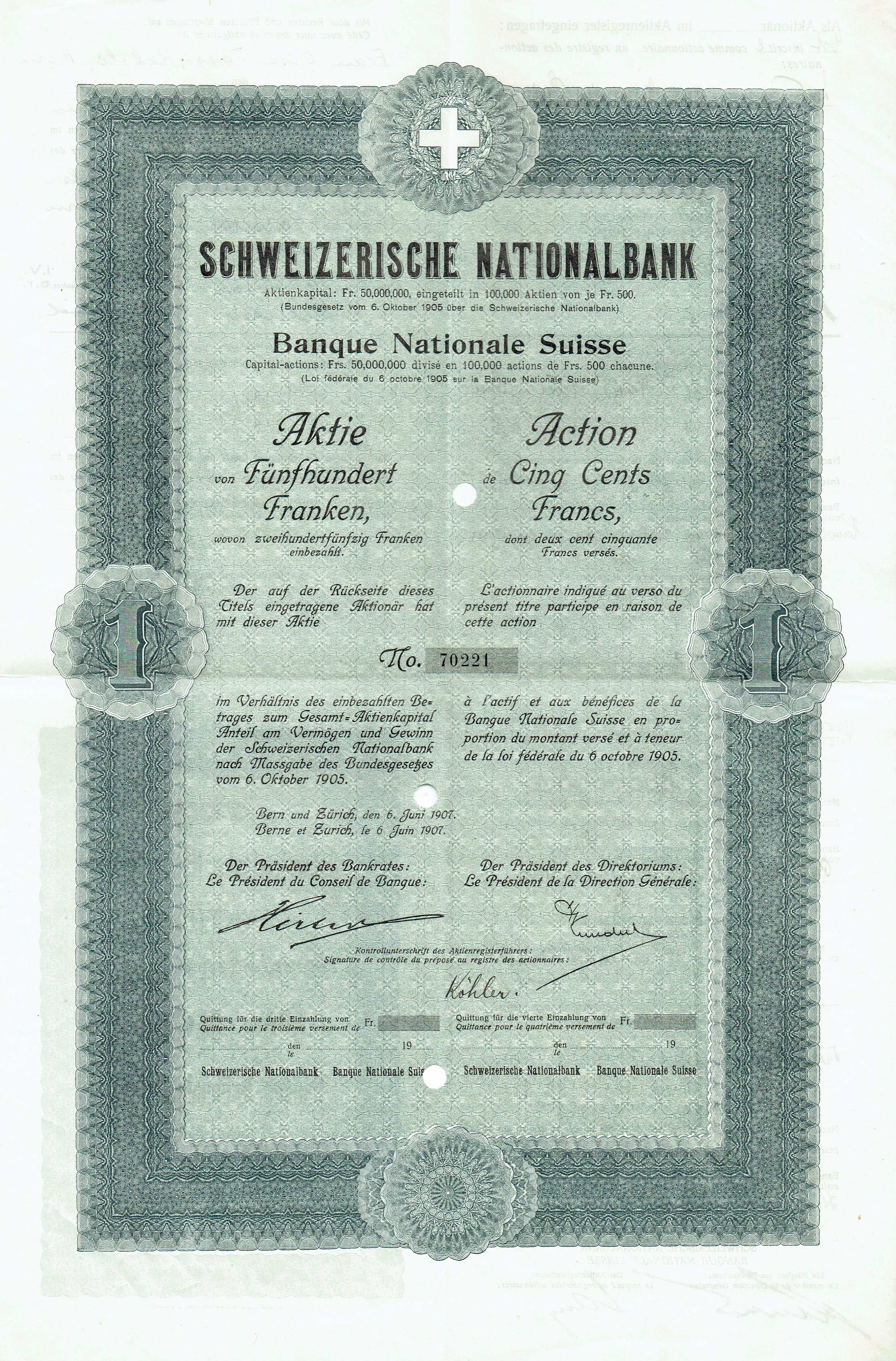
Share of the Swiss National Bank, issued 6. June 1907; signed by Johann Hirter as president of the Bank Council

Johann Daniel Hirter (5 May 1855, in Bern – 4 October 1926) was a Swiss politician and President of the Swiss National Council (1905/06). From 1906 to 1923, he presided over the Bank Council of the Swiss National Bank.

Preceded by Josef Anton Schobinger	President of the National Council; 1905/1906	Succeeded by Camille Decoppet
