= Social security in Switzerland =

The social security in Switzerland (in German Sozialversicherungen) includes several public and private insurance plans to assist the welfare of the population.

== Constitutional principles ==
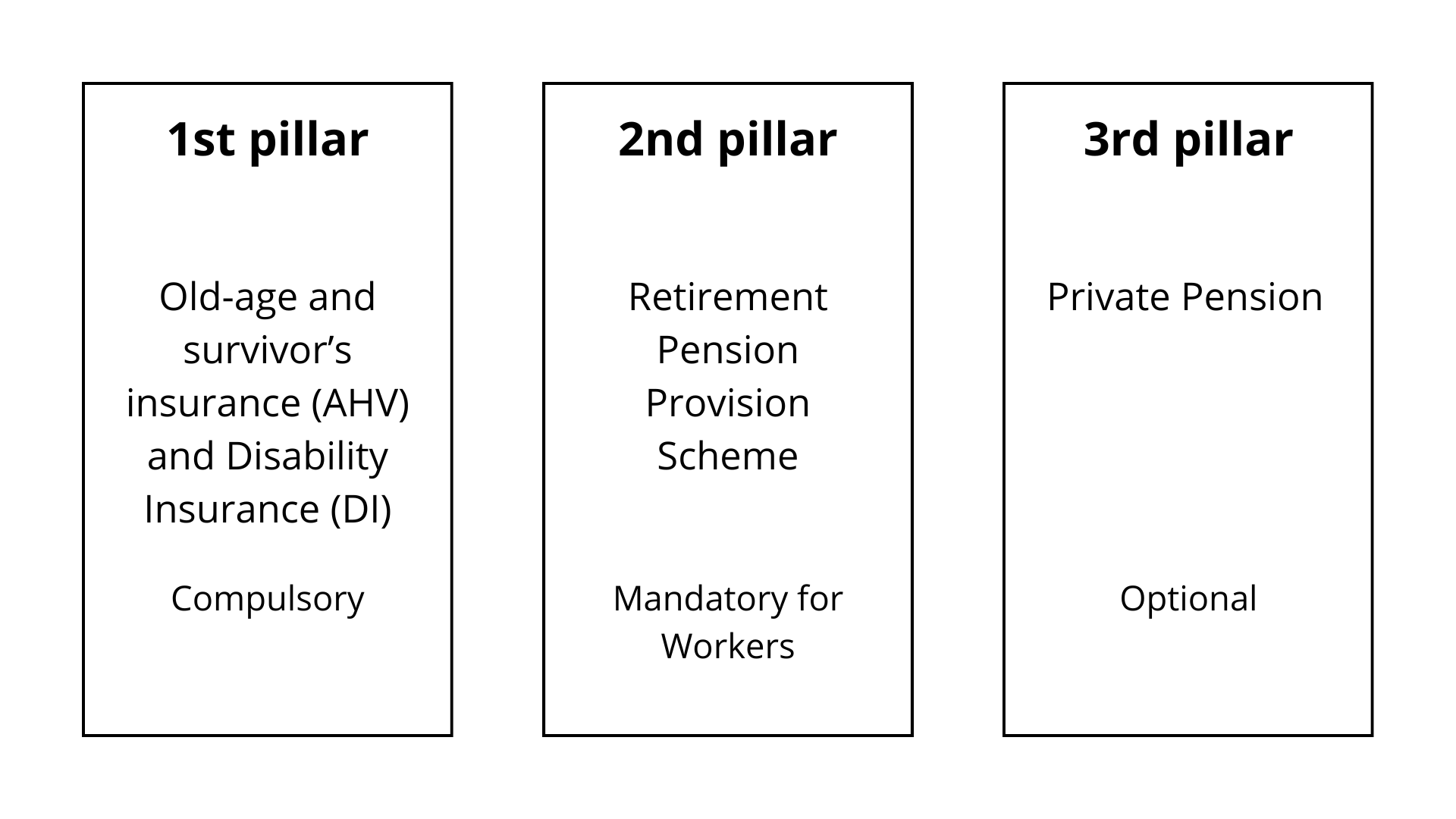
The three pillars of the Swiss pension system: 1. State pension : old-age and survivors insurance (OASI) and disability insurance (DI); 3. Occupational pension (pension funds); 3. Private pension (banks).

The basic principles of social insurance are found in Articles 111 to 114 and Articles 116 and 117 of the Swiss Federal Constitution.

Article 111 defines the so-called "three-pillar principle", which regulates the structure of retirement, survivors', and disability benefits. Article 112 provides the basis for the old-age, survivors', and disability insurance, in Article 113 that of occupational pensions. Article 114 regulates the basis of the unemployment insurance; provisions for family allowances and maternity insurance are laid down in Article 116. Finally, in Article 117 sickness and accident insurance is regulated by constitutional law.

The old-age and survivors' insurance (Alters- und Hinterlassenenversicherung - AHV), together with the disability insurance (Invalidenversicherung - IV) and supplementary benefits, forms the first (state) pillar of the Swiss three-pillar system and serves to adequately safeguard the need for subsistence.

== Financing ==
Social insurance is mostly financed by direct deductions from individual wages. The contributions are based on an individual's income. They are carried "on a parity basis," half by employers and half by employees. The only exception is health insurance, where income-independent head premiums are paid. In addition, there are also contributions from the public sector, for example old age pensions and disability pensions are financed by 5% from tobacco tax.

A significant share of domestic work in Switzerland is performed undeclared, leaving many workers, predominantly women, without old-age insurance (AHV/AVS) coverage for that income. According to an analysis by the Swiss compliance platform Clino, undeclared household work results in roughly CHF 141 million in uncollected AHV contributions each year.

== Individual types of social security ==
Social security insurance was introduced in Switzerland in 1948.

Social security services in Switzerland includes:

- Unemployment insurance (German: Arbeitslosenversicherung, ALV; French: Assurance-chômage, AC; Italian: Assicurazione contro la disoccupazione, AD), normally directly deducted from salary if resident is employed
- Income compensations (German: Erwerbsersatzordnung, EO; French: allocations pour perte de gain, APG)
- Family allowances (German: Familienzulagen, French: allocations familiales)
- Disability insurance (German: Invalidenversicherung, IV; French: Assurance-invalidité, AI; Italian: Assicurazione Invalidità, AI) normally directly deducted from salary if resident is employed
- Accident insurance (German: Unfallversicherung, French: assurance-accidents)
- Health insurance (German: Krankenversicherung; Italian: Assicurazione malattia) - compulsory for nearly all residents
- Pension funds
  - First pillar: state insurance (German: Alters- und Hinterlassenenversicherung, AHV; French: Assurance-vieillesse et survivants, AVS)
  - Second pillar: professional insurance (German: Berufliche Vorsorge, French: prévoyance professionnelle)
  - third pillar: personal insurance (German: 3. Säule, French: 3ème pilier)
- Social assistance (German: Sozialhilfe; French: aide sociale; Italian: assistenza sociale)
- Additional services

== See also ==
- Public Welfare Policy in Switzerland
- Pension system in Switzerland
- Taxation in Switzerland
- Federal Department of Home Affairs
- Old-age and survivors insurance in Switzerland
