= Josef Anton Schobinger =

Swiss politician (1849–1911)

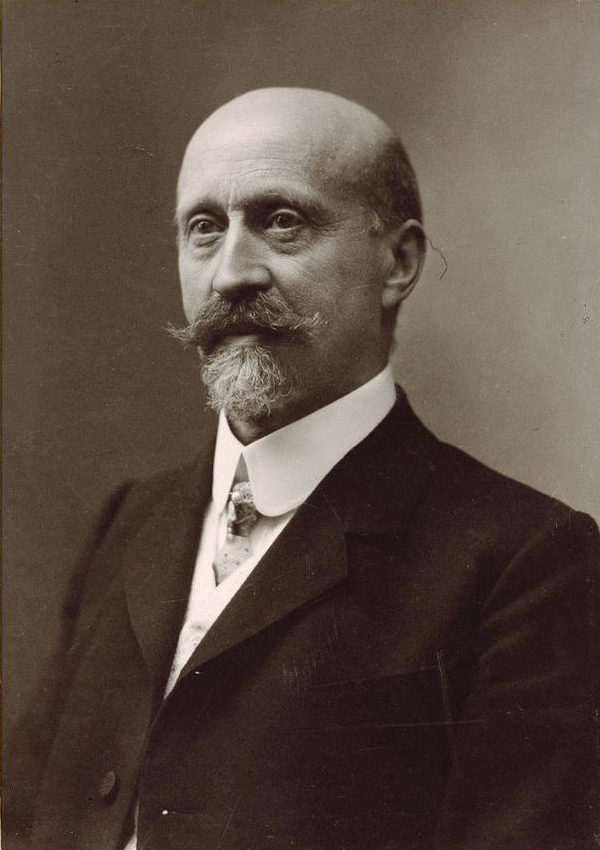
Josef Anton Schobinger

Josef Anton Schobinger (30 January 1849, in Lucerne – 27 November 1911) was a Swiss politician and member of the Swiss Federal Council (1908–1911).

He was elected to the Federal Council of Switzerland on 17 June 1908, and died in office on 27 November 1911. He was affiliated with the Christian Democratic People's Party of Switzerland.

While in office he held positions in the following departments:

- Department of Justice and Police (1908)
- Department of Trade, Industry and Agriculture (1909)
- Department of Finance (1910)
- Department of Home Affairs (1911)

Preceded by Louis Martin	President of the National Council; 1904/1905	Succeeded by Johann Hirter
Preceded by Josef Zemp	Member of the Swiss Federal Council; 1908–1911	Succeeded by Giuseppe Motta
