= Louis Martin (Swiss politician) =

Swiss politician

Louis-Alexandre Martin (7 April 1838 – 15 October 1913) was a Swiss politician and President of the Swiss National Council (1903/1904).

Preceded by Konrad Zschokke	President of the National Council; 1903/1904	Succeeded by Josef Anton Schobinger
