= Camille Decoppet =

Swiss politician (1862-1925)

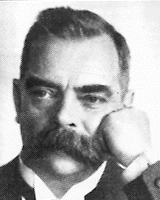

President of Switzerland
- In office 1 January 1916 – 31 December 1916
- Preceded by: Giuseppe Motta
- Succeeded by: Edmund Schulthess

Swiss Federal Councillor
- In office 17 July 1912 – 31 December 1919
- Department: Home Affairs (1912); Justice and Police (1913); Military (1914–1919)
- Preceded by: Marc-Emile Ruchet
- Succeeded by: Ernest Chuard

Personal details
- Born: 4 June 1862 Suscévaz, Vaud, Switzerland
- Died: 14 January 1925 (aged 62) Bern, Bern, Switzerland
- Party: Free Democratic Party

Camille Decoppet (French pronunciation: [kamij dəkɔpɛ]; 4 June 1862 – 14 January 1925) was a Swiss politician from Yverdon-les-Bains, Vaud who was a Federal Councillor from 1912 to 1919 and served as President of Switzerland in 1916.

== Biography ==
Decoppet grew up as the son of Henri-François, an innkeeper, and Philippine Alary. He was the brother of Maurice Decoppet, a later forestry expert who managed the Swiss supply of firewood, construction wood and peat during the First World War, and the cousin of Lucien Decoppet, a lawyer, banker and politician.

In 1888, Decoppet passed the bar exam, and practiced law for two years. From 1890 till 1896, he acted as a state prosecutor, followed by a tenure as a substitute judge at the Federal Supreme Court until 1912.

=== Politics ===
Decoppet held the following political offices:

- 1898–1901: member of the legislative council of Lausanne
- 1897–1900: member of the legislative council of Vaud
- 1899–1912: member of the National Council
- 1900–1912: member of the executive council of Vaud, responsible for education and culture.

On 17 July 1912, he was elected to the Federal Council with a stellar result, and resigned from the office on 31 December 1919. He was affiliated with the Free Democratic Party.

During his office time he held the following departments:

- Department of Home Affairs (1912)
- Department of Justice and Police (1913)
- Military Department (1914–1919)

He was President of the Confederation in 1916.

Political offices
Preceded by Johann Hirter	President of the National Council; 1906–1907	Succeeded by Paul Speiser
Preceded by Marc-Émile Ruchet	Member of the Swiss Federal Council; 1912–1919	Succeeded by Ernest Chuard
