= 2024 referendum on the Expansion programme for the national highways =

Swiss referendum on national highway expansions

The Swiss referendum on the National Highways Expansion Plan happened on November 24, 2024. It was about a federal resolution from September 29, 2023, to expand parts of Switzerland's national highways. The plan focused on upgrading six sections of the highway network. But, because some folks launched an optional referendum against it, the issue went to a public vote, and 52.7% of voters said no.

== Proposal Details ==
The resolution from September 29, 2023, was all about fixing traffic bottlenecks in six key sections of Switzerland's national highway system.

- Bern Region: The Bern–Wankdorf–Schönbühl section of the A1 was to be expanded to eight lanes, and the Schönbühl–Kirchberg section to six lanes.
- City of St. Gallen: Construction of a third tube for the Rosenberg Tunnel on the A1.
- City of Basel: Construction of a Rhine tunnel to relieve the eastern bypass of the A2.
- City of Schaffhausen: Construction of a second tube for the Fäsenstaub Tunnel on the A4.
- Lake Geneva Region: Expansion to six lanes of the Le Vengeron (near Geneva)–Coppet–Nyon section of the A1.

The projects needed about 0.53 square kilometres (0.20 square miles) (530,000 square meters) of land.

The estimated cost for these projects was 4.9 billion Swiss francs, covered by the National Highways and Urban Transport Fund. This fund gets its money mainly from motorized traffic through the fuel tax surcharge, the highway vignette, and the automobile tax so that these projects would not directly impact the federal budget.

A 2021 study from the Federal Office for Spatial Development pegged external costs from private motorized transport (e.g., environmental damage, accidents, and health issues) at 21.6 billion Swiss francs.

== Development of the Federal Resolution ==
On February 22, 2023, the Federal Council sent its dispatch with the draft federal resolution for the 2023 National Highways Expansion Plan to the Federal Assembly of Switzerland.

The National Council took up the proposal on May 30, 2023. Some minority groups in the Transport and Telecommunications Committee (TTC) wanted to send the draft back to the Federal Council, asking for revisions to better align with federal environmental, climate, and energy goals, but this idea was shot down in a 106-to-85 vote. At the TTC's urging, the National Council tweaked the draft to include expanding the Vengeron - Coppet - Nyon section of the A1. The Council of States backed the National Council’s decisions on September 20, 2023, and both chambers gave their final approval on September 29, 2023. In the National Council, the vote was 107 in favor, 87 against, with 1 abstention. The Council of States passed it with 33 in favor, 6 against, and 5 abstentions. The Swiss People's Party and FDP factions in the National Council were all-in for the proposal, and the Centre Party mostly supported it (with just 3 votes against). Meanwhile, the Social Democratic, Green, and Green Liberal Parties were united in voting against it (except for one abstention).

== Facultative Referendum ==
The Swiss Association for Transport and Environment (VCS-ATE-ATA) launched a referendum to challenge the federal resolution. On January 22, 2024, the Federal Chancellery confirmed that the referendum pulled through, gathering 65,377 valid signatures.

== Arguments For and Against ==
=== Arguments in Favor ===
The parliamentary majority and the Federal Council made the case that people and goods need a reliable road network to keep moving. With traffic on the rise, national highways are getting clogged at multiple spots. In 2023, traffic jams racked up over 48,000 hours, leading to major time and money losses. Congestion also pushes traffic into cities, villages, and neighborhoods, raising the risk of accidents. Three of the six projects focus on adding tunnel tubes, which would make it easier to maintain existing tunnels without rerouting traffic.

The supporting committee pegged the yearly cost of traffic jams at 1.2 billion Swiss francs. Heavy congestion also ramps up CO2 emissions, so easing these bottlenecks could give the climate a break.

=== Arguments Against ===
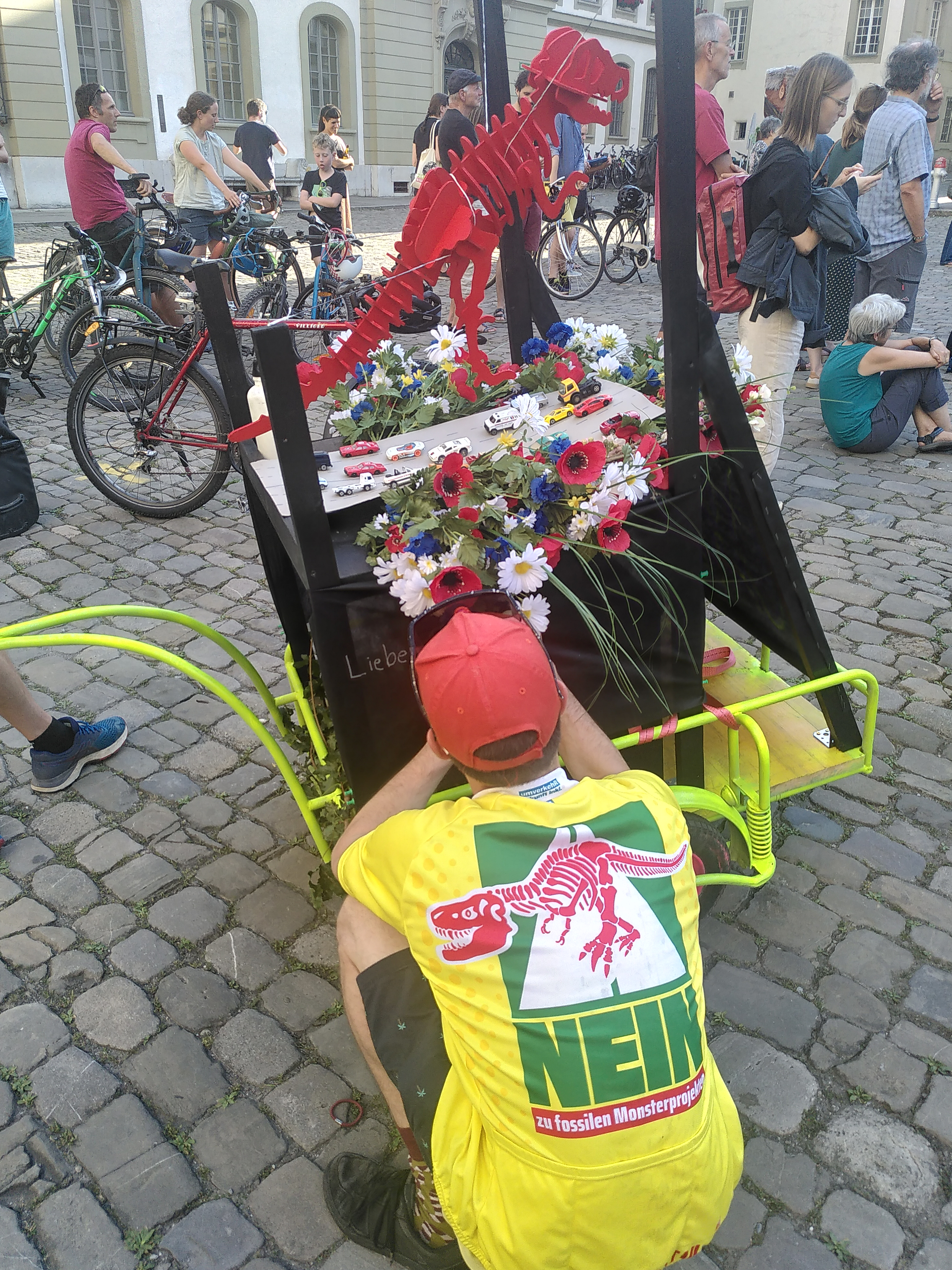
Demonstration against highway expansion on August 23, 2024, in Bern

The referendum committee argued that expanding highways would not fix traffic issues but would actually make them worse. Wider roads might ease things for a bit, but extra lanes just draw more cars, leading to fresh traffic jams. More traffic puts a heavier load on neighborhoods, villages, and cities, where most car trips start and end. Long-term construction messes with traffic flow, and expansion ramps up noise and air pollution, sticking the public with big costs. Plus, valuable natural and cultural land would be lost, paving the way for urban sprawl and more concrete. Instead, they pushed for prioritizing public transport and cycling.

== Campaign Financing ==
Since 2024, campaign financing must be disclosed, with the Swiss Federal Audit Office publishing the declared budgets by October 25, 2024, at the latest.

	Support (CHF)	Opposition (CHF)
SME and Trade Association Canton Zurich	90,000	
Cross-Party Committee “Yes to Securing National Highways SG/TG”	252,500	
National Committee “Yes to Securing National Highways”	3,922,770	
Oui à la troisième voie – Assurer le futur des routes nationales	350,774	
Greenpeace		70,000
Green Party of Switzerland		105,000
Social Democratic Party of Switzerland		307,000
umverkehR		500,000
Swiss Transport Club (VCS)		1,759,750
Total	4,616,044	2,741,750

As of: November 24, 2024

== Referendum ==
=== Referendum Question ===
Do you accept the federal resolution of September 29, 2023, on the 2023 National Highways Expansion Plan?

=== Campaign Positions ===
In favor:

- Parties: FDP, The Centre, SVP
- Associations and organizations: Economiesuisse, Swiss Trade Association, Touring Club Switzerland

Against:

- Parties: EVP, GLP, Green Party, SP
- Associations and organizations: Swiss Transport Club, WWF Switzerland, Pro Natura, Greenpeace, Alpine Initiative, Small Farmers' Association

=== Referendum Results ===
The federal resolution was rejected by 52.7% of voters. Opposition majorities were recorded in all six French-speaking cantons, Ticino, and in German-speaking cantons with larger cities (Zurich, Bern, Lucerne, Basel-Stadt) and mountainous cantons (Uri, Obwalden, Glarus, and Graubünden). Support was stronger in rural and smaller urban areas of German-speaking Switzerland (cantons Schwyz, Nidwalden, Zug, Solothurn, Basel-Landschaft, Schaffhausen, Appenzell Ausserrhoden, Appenzell Innerrhoden, St. Gallen, Aargau, Thurgau), though the cities of Schaffhausen and St. Gallen, directly affected by the projects, voted against.

A post-referendum survey revealed a significant gender gap: 61% of women but only 44% of men voted against the proposal.
