= Spitex =

Out-of-hospital care services in Switzerland

Spitex is a Swiss term, coined in the 1960s, for health and social care services provided outside hospitals. It is a short form of the German Spitalexterne Kranken- und Gesundheitspflege (out-of-hospital nursing and health care). The umbrella association Spitex Verband Schweiz, formed in 1995, groups the non-profit cantonal associations, while profit-oriented home care providers also use the term.

== Scope ==
The term covers all outpatient and semi-outpatient services of the health and social systems, such as community nursing (Gemeindekrankenpflege), home care and family help (Hauspflege und Familienhilfe), household help and other services, among them lay services, occupational therapy and physiotherapy, the services of family doctors or midwives, advice for mothers (Mütterberatung) and social work. The main tasks of Spitex shifted from the care of women after childbirth and from family help to the care of the elderly and the chronically ill.

== Organizations ==
The umbrella association Spitex Verband Schweiz, formed in 1995, is a federation of the non-profit cantonal associations, to which the local organizations in the municipalities belong. There are also profit-oriented home care organizations that use the term Spitex. The Association Spitex privée Suisse was founded in 2005 to represent the interests of the private providers.

== Bibliography ==
- P. Eschmann et al. (eds.), Ambulante Krankenpflege, Spitex-Handbuch, 1990 (2nd ed. 1996)
