= Old-age and survivors insurance in Switzerland =

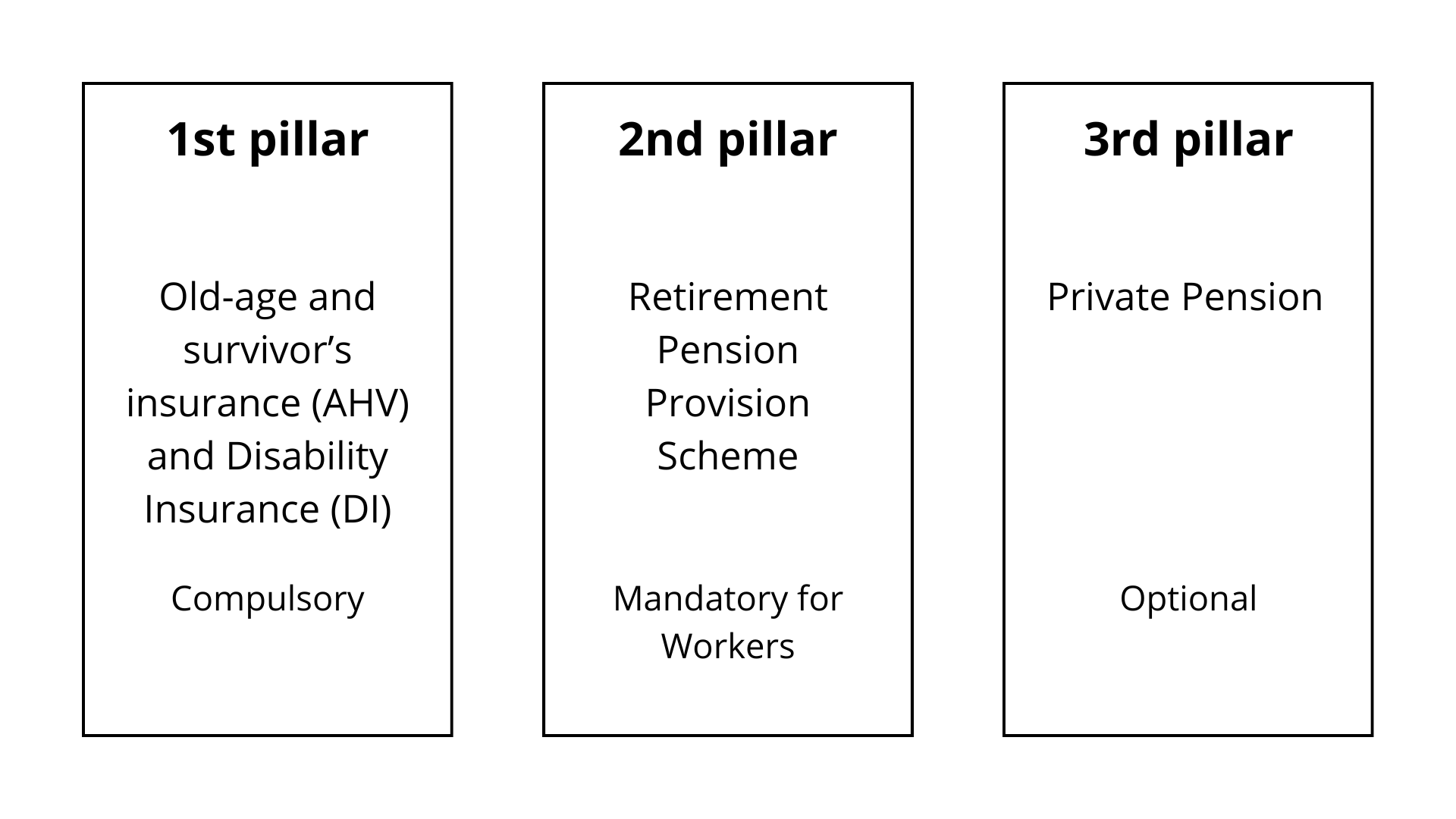
The three pillars of the Swiss pension system: 1. State pension : old-age and survivors insurance (OASI) and disability insurance (DI); 3. Occupational pension (pension funds); 3. Private pension (banks).

Old-age and survivors insurance (OASI, French: AVS German: AHV) constitutes one of the main social security schemes in Switzerland.

The federal law on OASI was passed on December 20, 1946, and approved by popular vote on July 6, 1947, by almost 80% of the votes. It was subsequently harmonized and coordinated with the federal law on disability insurance adopted in 1959. A series of ordinances, the most important being the regulation on old-age and survivors insurance, specifies this.

From the January 1, 1948, date of its entry into force, this legislation underwent numerous modifications. Until 1974, the evolution of the OASI was a fairly accurate reflection of the post-war economic boom. Between 1975 and 2008, the OASI was subject to ten actual revisions and three minor legislative revisions. An 11th revision is under discussion in 2009.

This is a pay-as-you-go pension system, the law on occupational pensions (2nd pillar) being a funded pension system. The OASI also allows for a (partial) redistribution of wealth. According to the Federal Social Insurance Office, the OASI is “the most important branch of the Swiss social insurance system”.

== Mandatory contribution ==
All people carrying out gainful activity in Switzerland are required to contribute, as well as, under certain conditions, people working abroad on behalf of an employer in Switzerland. Since January 1, 1997, date of entry into force of the last (10th) revision of the OASI, widows and married women without gainful activity are now subject to the obligation to contribute. However, the contributions of a married woman without gainful activity are considered to be paid if the husband is in gainful activity and has paid at least double the minimum contribution. This rule is independent of sex: the husband without gainful activity of a woman who exercises gainful activity also does not pay a contribution if his wife has paid at least double the minimum contribution. Contributions are not capped and represent 8.7% of income for employees (paid equally between the employee and the employer) and 8.1% for the self-employed. People domiciled in Switzerland, but not engaged in gainful activity, are also required to pay contributions based on assets and income acquired in the form of an annuity. The minimum contribution for non-active people is between CHF 478 and CHF 23,900 per year.

== History of the OASI ==
=== Before the introduction of the OASI ===
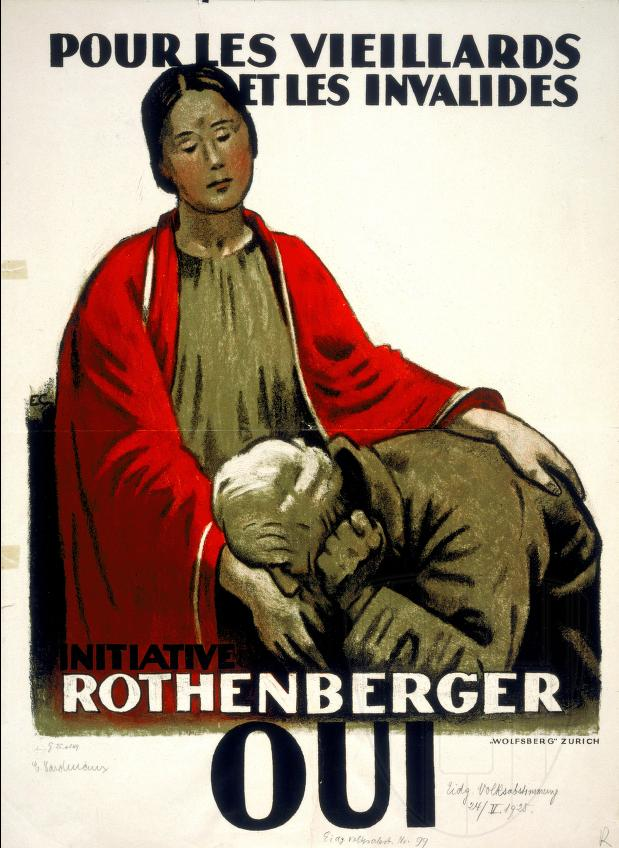
Poster for the Rothenberger initiative, which was rejected in May 1925. In December of the same year, the Federal Council's (constitutional) OASI project was accepted by popular vote. The law was adopted in 1947 and has been in force since 1948.

Until the 19th century, it generally fell to families, charities and churches to care for elderly people unable to work. There was also a rudimentary system of public assistance for the needy, although the rules were often restrictive. Between 1883 and 1889, Otto von Bismarck established social insurance (sickness, accidents, disability and old age) in Germany. At the same time, voices were raised in Switzerland to demand the establishment of social measures making it possible, in particular, to fight against the glaring poverty of working families. In 1890 the first constitutional basis for health and accident insurance was thus created. However, it took more than twenty years (1912) for a law to be accepted by the people and for this assurance to become reality.

The introduction of old-age and survivors insurance was among the demands of the 1918 general strike.

The constitutional basis of the OASI was created in 1925; a first project, however, was rejected by the people in 1931. During the Second World War (1939–1945), the Federal Council took advantage of its extraordinary powers to promote the development of social insurance. This is how he created the allowance schemes for loss of salary and earnings intended for the military – which today have become allowances for loss of earnings –, the organization and method of financing of which served as the basis for the OASI. On July 6, 1947, during a second vote, the federal law on old-age and survivors insurance (LAVS in French) was widely accepted by the people. It came into force on January 1st of the following year.

=== Since the establishment of the OASI (criar referencias) ===
Since 1948, the LAVS has been revised ten times. Originally, the maximum pension was 40 francs, which would currently be equivalent, taking inflation into account, to 183 francs.

The minimum pension today amounts to 1,175 francs. During the 7th revision of the OASI (1969), the amount of pensions was increased to 220 francs. During the 8th revision (1973), pensions were increased by 80% and, two years later, by another 25%. Combined with additional benefits, introduced in 1966, the OASI pension guarantees the minimum subsistence level, in accordance with the aim enshrined in the Constitution. Since the 9th revision of the OASI, pensions are regularly adapted to inflation and price changes. In 1997, the 10th revision introduced the individual pension system, as well as income splitting. Each person thus receives their own pension, whatever their marital status, and the income received during the period of marriage is divided by two and allocated to both spouses. The measure constitutes a big step forward, particularly for divorced women. In addition, bonuses for educational and assistance tasks have been introduced. They supplement the pension-forming income of people who take care of a child under 16 years old. The improvements did not only concern old age insurance, since a widower's pension was also introduced.

Despite a recognized need for reform, the legal bases of the OASI have not been adapted since 1997. Several projects as well as popular initiatives have failed before the people, the last time on September 24, 2017, date of rejection of the 2020 Old Age Insurance reform, which provided for adaptations to both the OASI and occupational pensions. Preparatory work for a new reform of old age provision is underway. The retirement age for men has remained 65, unchanged since 1948. That for women, on the other hand, has been modified several times; originally, it was also set at 65 years, but a couple's pension was paid from the moment the man was 65 and his wife 60. The retirement age for women was lowered to 63 in 1957, and to 62 years in 1964. In 1979, the threshold age giving entitlement to a couple's pension was raised for women to 62 years as part of the consolidation plan provided for by the 9th revision of the AVS. The 10th revision raised the retirement age for women in two stages to 63 (in 2001), then to 64 (in 2005) ^{.} It also made possible the early receipt of an annuity.

In the second version of the draft 11th revision of the OASI, the Federal Council proposed to Parliament to increase the retirement age for women to 65 and to encourage early retirement for people of modest means through financial support. Parliament rejected this revision in October 2010. The theme of retirement age was taken up during the 2020 Old Age Insurance reform, which planned to set the reference age at 65 for both women and men, with the time of retirement being freely variable. chosen between 62 and 70 years old.

Contributions levied on salaries to finance the OASI increased from 4 to 8.4% between 1969 and 1975. As for contributions from the self-employed, they increased from 4.6 to 7.8% between 1969 and 1979. Since then, contribution rates remained unchanged. The Confederation's contribution has gradually increased and since 2008 has amounted to 19.55% of insurance expenditure. VAT was increased by one point in 1999, the amount thus collected being allocated to OASI.

== Services ==
The OASI grants old age pensions, widow's and widower's pensions. Since January 1, 1997, husband and wife now each receive their pension. This is set according to the duration of contributions of each spouse and their income, in application of splitting . This means that half of the income obtained during the marriage by both the husband and the wife is recorded in the account of the other spouse. Added to this are bonuses for educational tasks or assistance tasks assigned to family members who look after children or take care of impotent parents.

For a full contribution period (scale 44), the amount of the AVS pension, in 2018, is a minimum of 1,175 Swiss francs per month, and that of the maximum pension, 2,350 Swiss francs per month. The maximum amount - two pensions - for a couple, on the other hand, is 3,525 Swiss francs.

The Federal Department of Finance has made available a pension calculator (ESCAL) for people who are wondering about the future pension they will receive upon retirement, on their website. This website complements the compensation funds which can provide information on retirement-related issues at any time, regardless of the age of the applicant. However, these estimates on this website are based on hypothetical elements, the calculations of which imply that the amounts announced are indicative. The amounts indicated therefore have no legal value and do not bind the Swiss Compensation Fund. To know precisely the pension that a retiree will receive, the future retiree will have to wait until he has almost reached retirement age, and until he has provided all the necessary documents to his compensation fund so that it can calculate your future pension.

== Opening of the right to a pension ==
The right to a pension begins on the 1st day of the month following the month in which the insured person reached retirement age. People must register with the compensation funds to be entitled to their pension. This request must nevertheless be made several months in advance, to allow the pension to be calculated.

=== Retirement age (reference age) ===
For men, the retirement age is 65.

The retirement age for women increases from 63 in 2001 to 64 in 2005 . It will be raised from 64 to 65 years in four stages. With the reform coming into force on January 1 ^{,} 2024, the reference age of women will increase for the first time by three months on January 1, 2025^{.} This first stage will concern women born in 1961. The following stages will concern reference age at 64 years and six months for women born in 1962, then at 64 years and nine months for those born in 1963 and finally at 65 years for those born in 1964. From the start of 2028, the reference age will therefore be 65 years for all insured persons. The step-by-step increase in the reference age applies by analogy to occupational pensions.

Reference age for women aged 64 to 65
year of birth	Reference age (entry into force in 2025)
1961	64 years + 3 months
1962	64 years + 6 months
1963	64 years + 9 months
from 1964	65 years

Two compensation measures for women of the transitional generation (from 1961 to 1969) are planned. The first is a lifetime supplement. Women of the transitional generation who decide not to bring forward their retirement pension will receive a monthly OASI pension supplement for life, which corresponds to the percentage of a basic supplement. The second measure is preferential rates in case of anticipation of the annuity. Women belonging to the transitional generation will have the possibility of retiring from the age of 62. In this case, women with low income levels will benefit from more favorable reduction rates than those with higher incomes.

This increase in the retirement age for women follows the vote of September 25, 2022. The people and the cantons accepted the OASI reform 21. As for men, retirement will be made more flexible and VAT will increase slightly.

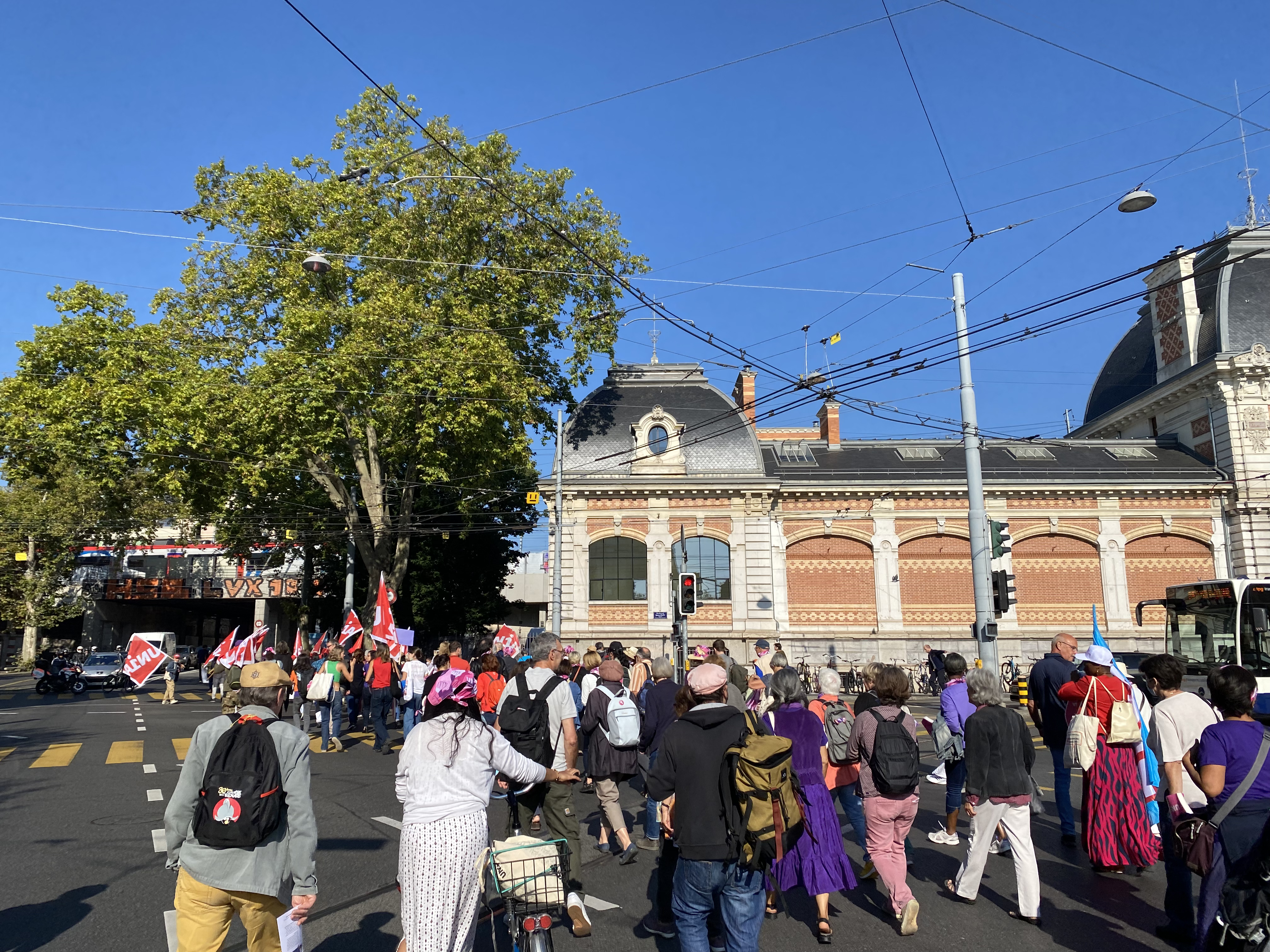
Start of the march against raising the retirement age in Geneva on 18 September 2021

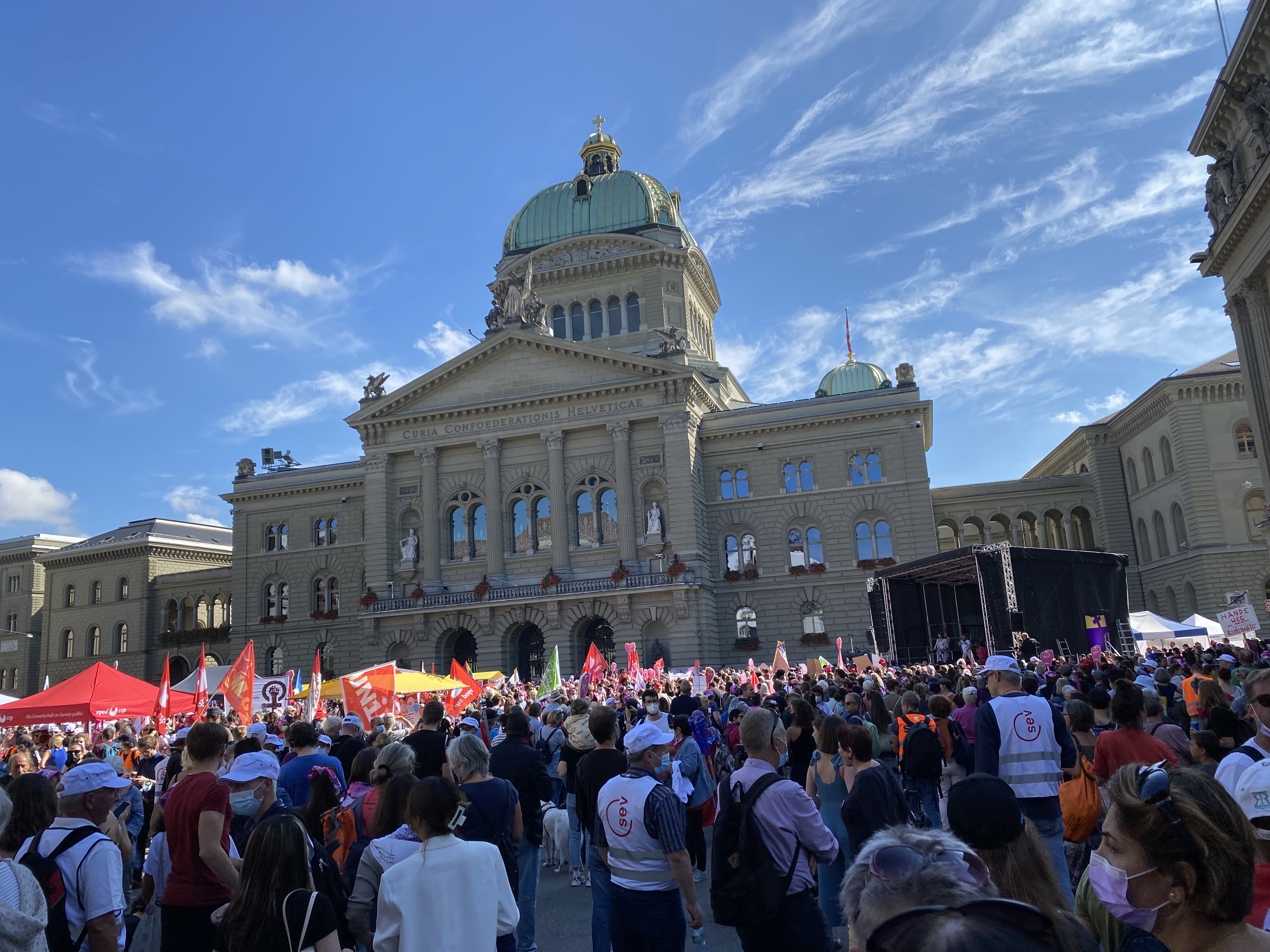
March against the reform of the AVS at 65 in Bern, Switzerland on 18 September 2021

After the successive failures of pension reform – eleventh revision 2004 then in 2010, eleventh revision bis (2010), project to reduce the conversion rate of the second pillar in 2010 and “Old age provision 2020” in 2017 –, Federal Councilor Alain Berset presents another project, entitled “AVS 21”. The project is accepted by the two federal chambers - National Council and Council of States, the latter approving the principle of a retirement age of 65 by 31 votes against 13 in March 2021 -, but is the subject of a request for referendum, filed on March 25, 2022.

An initiative filed on July 18, 2021by the young PLR with 107,000 signatures proposes at the same time to raise the retirement age to improve the financing of the OASI, by harmonizing the retirement ages of men and women at 66 years. Entitled “For secure and lasting old age provision”, the initiative was criticized by the youth sections of the PBD, PDC, PEV, PVL and UDC parties, who considered that it called into question an old agreement.

On September 18, 2021, demonstrations are organized across the country by Swiss trade union organizations. Feminist associations and the USS highlight the current inequalities in the retirement system, with women receiving 37% less on average than men. The demonstration brought together 15,000 people in Bern.

=== Flexible retirement age ===
All insured persons can, if they wish, receive their pension before the ordinary retirement age. In return, a reduction in their pension is applied. Advance payment can be requested for a maximum of one or two years. It is also possible to postpone the pension for people who wish to continue professional activity beyond the ordinary retirement age.

== Evolution of the OASI ==
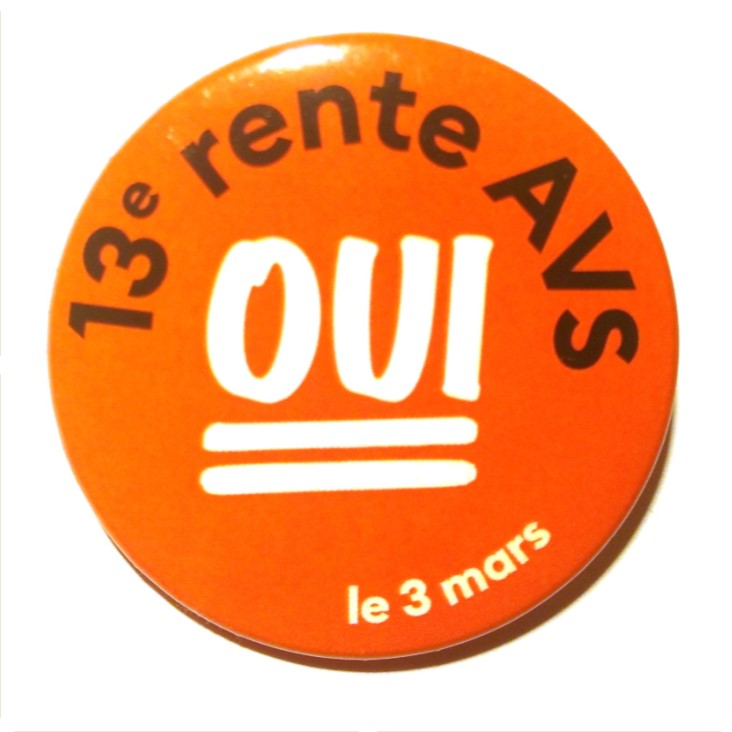
Badge for the federal popular initiative for a 13th AHV pension, approved in a referendum on 3 March 2024.

In 2017, the Swiss Socialist Party proposed to parliament the creation of a sovereign fund which would supply the old-age and survivors insurance pension fund.

The USS and the Green and Socialist parties denounce the financing of retirement falling to women, and the USS has proposed an initiative for a 13th OASI pension (based on the 13th salary model). During the federal votes of March 2024, the initiative was accepted by a double majority (of the people and the cantons).

== See also ==
- Social security in Switzerland
- Pension system in Switzerland
- Federal Social Insurance Office
