= Competition Commission =

Competition Commission may refer to:

- Bangladesh Competition Commission
- Competition Commission (Hong Kong)
- Competition Commission of India
- Competition and Consumer Protection Commission, Ireland
- Comisión Federal de Competencia Económica, Mexico
- Competition Commission of Pakistan
- Philippine Competition Commission
- Competition Commission (South Africa)
- Competition Commission of Switzerland
- Trade Competition Commission, Thailand
- Competition Commission (United Kingdom)

== See also ==
- Competition regulator
