= FTC =

FTC may refer to:

== Commerce ==
- Fair Trade Commission (disambiguation)
- Federal Trade Commission, an American antitrust and consumer protection agency
- FTC Kaplan, or Financial Training Company, a former name of Kaplan Financial Ltd, a financial training institution in the United Kingdom

== Entertainment ==
- Fashion Television Channel, a Canadian television channel

== Science, mathematics, and technology ==
- Emtricitabine, an antiretroviral drug used to treat HIV, commonly abbreviated as FTC (from (−)-2′,3′-dideoxy-5-fluoro-3′-thiacytidine) in medical literature
- Fault-tolerant computer system
- FIRST Tech Challenge, a robotics competition for students
- Follicular thyroid cancer, a type of cancer
- Fundamental theorem of calculus, a mathematical theorem
- Fusion Technology Center, a research organisation in South Korea

== Other uses ==
- Fairfield Transportation Center
- Federal Transfer Center, Oklahoma City, part of the United States Federal Bureau of Prisons
- Ferencvárosi TC, a Hungarian sports club
- Free the Children, an international children's rights and development organization
- Free Tibet Campaign, a British human rights organizations
- RAF Flying Training Command, within the United Kingdom Royal Air Force
