= Military justice in Switzerland =

Specialized judicial authority for military criminal matters in Switzerland

Swiss Military Justice
- Founded: 1928
- Type: Judicial authority
- Headquarters: Switzerland
- Website: oa.admin.ch

Military Criminal Code (CPM)
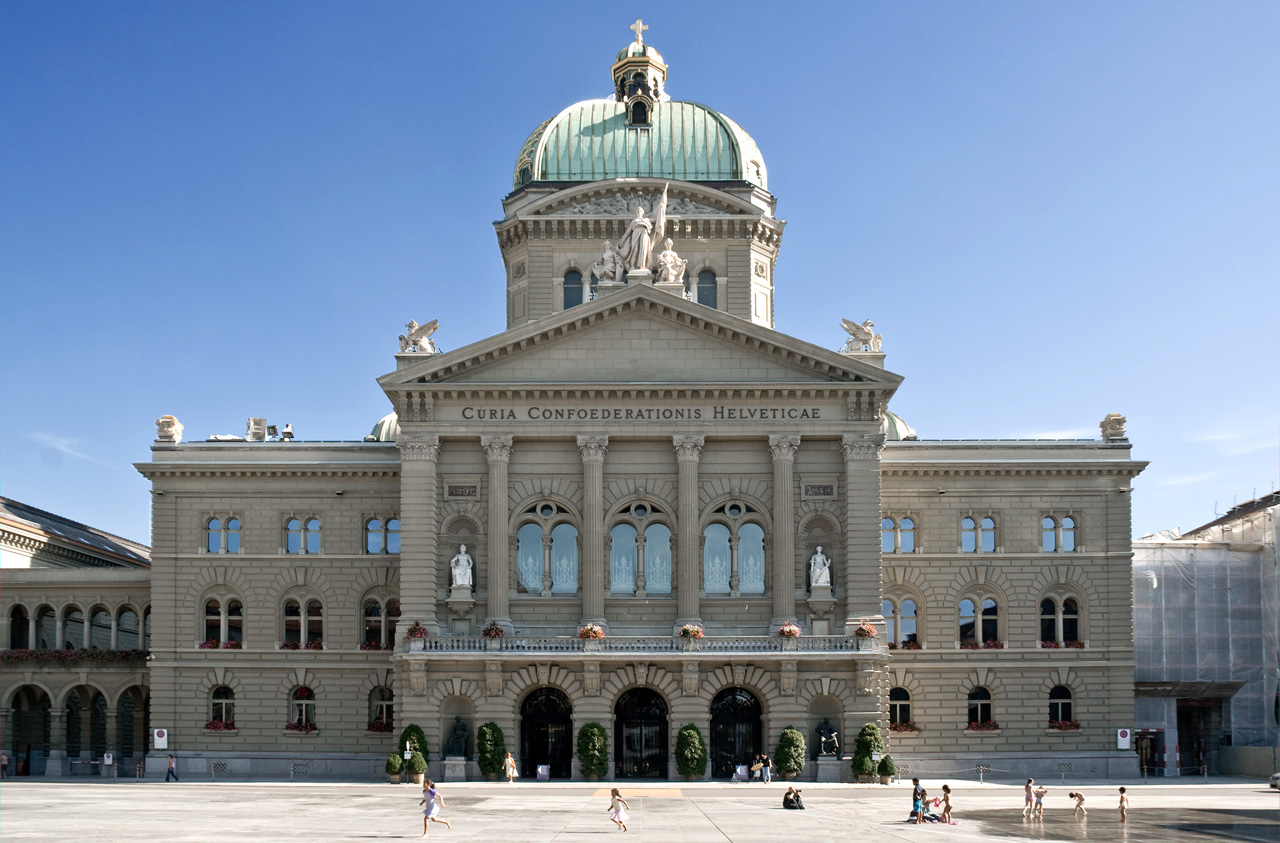

Federal Assembly of Switzerland
- Long title: Military Criminal Code (SR 321.0)
- Territorial extent: Switzerland
- Enacted by: Federal Assembly of Switzerland
- Enacted: 13 June 1927
- Commenced: 1 January 1928
- Status: Current legislation

Swiss Military Justice is the specialized judicial authority responsible for the prosecution and adjudication of military criminal matters in Switzerland. It handles approximately 2,000 criminal proceedings annually.

It is governed by the Military Criminal Code, (Note: German: Militärstrafgesetz, MStG; French: Code pénal militaire, CPM; Italian: Codice penale militare) enacted on 13 June 1927.

== History ==
=== Medieval and early modern origins ===
The foundations of Swiss military justice are rooted in the medieval period. The Covenant of Sempach of 1393 established early principles governing military discipline and penal jurisdiction, establishing that the law of a soldier's place of origin applied to infractions committed during campaigns, with the troops themselves holding judicial authority. By the 16th century, a military court composed of military personnel and presided over by a supreme field judge (Feldgerichtsherre) had been established, with a single individual combining the functions of investigating judge and public accuser, titles evolving to profos (from the French prévôt) and later auditor.

=== Mercenary service and codification ===
During the era of Swiss mercenary service abroad, regiments serving foreign sovereigns could not be subjected to the penal jurisdiction of the sovereigns employing them. To address the practical difficulties this created, officers were provided with a Swiss military code (Schweitzerisches Kriegs-Recht) beginning in 1704, which included provisions describing military offenses, penalties, and procedure. In 1734 and 1756, Latin translations of the Carolina (1532), the criminal code of Charles V, were adopted under the influence of legally trained auditors and subsequently served as the basis for military jurisprudence across all Swiss troops in foreign service. The uniformity achieved through mercenary service thus established the foundation for a unified military penal system.

=== Modern establishment ===
During the Helvetic Republic, the first comprehensive military penal provisions applicable to domestic armies were introduced. After several brief codification attempts, the Diet adopted in 1838 a law on penal justice applicable to federal troops, establishing a military justice staff under the command of the chief auditor composed of legally trained officers, the ancestor of the present military justice auxiliary service.

Following the 1848 Constitution, the Federal Assembly enacted a penal law for federal troops featuring jury courts, though it was excessively complicated. In 1889, the Federal Assembly approved the organization of military penal justice, a reform prepared by future Federal Councillor Eduard Müller that remained in effect with modifications through both world wars.

=== 20th century development ===
The Military Criminal Code (Note: German: Militärstrafgesetz, MStG; French: Code pénal militaire, CPM; Italian: Codice penale militare) was enacted on June 13, 1927, entering into force on January 1, 1928. Drafted by Ernst Hafter on behalf of the Federal Council, the code was substantially similar to the civilian Swiss Penal Code of 1942 but included provisions specific to military circumstances. Until 1992, the code authorized capital punishment for treason during wartime. This penalty was carried out several times by divisional courts between 1939 and 1945, though execution required confirmation by the military court of cassation and denial of clemency by the Federal Assembly.

A new military criminal procedure entered into force in 1980, reducing the number of divisional judges and creating an intermediate appellate level, the military appellate court. It also extended military court of cassation access to non-commissioned officers and soldiers, previously limited to officers. Beginning in the 1990s, Swiss military justice began prosecuting violations of international humanitarian law. In 2004, divisional courts were renamed military courts of first instance.

The 2018 reorganization of military justice and the 2019 reform of victim rights in military proceedings strengthened structural independence of prosecution authorities and significantly expanded rights for victims in military proceedings, harmonizing the military and ordinary systems. Civilian participation in military proceedings has increased, particularly in cases involving traffic accidents, accidents during military exercises, physical altercations, and property damage.

== Structure and organization ==
Swiss military justice operates according to a militia model. Members of military justice bodies are militia members, but the organization itself functions independently from the military command structure, with its independence guaranteed by law.

=== Authority composition ===
Military justice comprises both prosecution and judicial authorities organized in three linguistic regions. Each region operates:

- Investigation judges (Note: German: Untersuchungsrichter; French: juges d'instruction; Italian: Giudici istruttori) and auditors
- Military courts (first instance)
- Military appellate courts (second instance)
- Military court of cassation (supreme instance)

The three regions are organized by language: the francophone region (Region 1), germanophone region (Region 2), and italophone region (Region 3). The chief auditor, serving as head of military justice, oversees the directors of investigation judges and public prosecutors and exercises certain procedural functions.

=== Dual-tier prosecution model ===
The Swiss military justice system relies on an investigating judge, independent of both the parties and prosecution, and a public prosecutor auditor. Unlike common law systems, military unit commanders are limited to discovery and reporting of punishable acts; they do not participate in investigations, prosecution, or trial, except for their disciplinary authority.

== Jurisdiction and scope ==
Military justice applies to members of the Swiss armed forces when on active duty, military personnel in particular circumstances outside of service, and in certain cases, civilians collaborating closely with military institutions or participating in infractions affecting military interests. During wartime, the scope expands significantly to cover any person committing military infractions.

Approximately 95 percent of military justice proceedings concern strictly military offenses. Non-military offenses committed by individuals subject to military law remain within ordinary civilian jurisdiction, except where they relate to military status or duty obligations.

Approximately 70 percent of military proceedings concern violations of the duty to serve.

== Penal framework ==
The Military Criminal Code distinguishes between crimes (infractions subject to imprisonment exceeding three years) and misdemeanors (infractions subject to imprisonment not exceeding three years or fines). The code encompasses categories including insubordination, abuse of authority conferring military status, violations of service duties, failure to fulfill military service obligations, infractions against national defense, and violations of international humanitarian law.

Penalties include fines, imprisonment, degradation (for military personnel), exclusion from the military, and in specific circumstances, deportation for foreigners. The code further provides for disciplinary sanctions distinct from criminal penalties, administered by unit commanders.

== Criticism and debate ==
The existence of military justice as an exception to ordinary judicial processes has been periodically contested. In 1990, a task force on military reform proposed replacing military courts with civilian penal courts at the cantonal level, a recommendation renewed in subsequent parliamentary initiatives. Most recently, in 2004, Councillor Josef Lang submitted a parliamentary initiative to abolish military justice and transfer its functions to civilian courts, arguing that the specialized judiciary had become anachronistic in a society increasingly sensitive to the rule of law.

The Federal Council and parliamentary majorities have consistently rejected abolition proposals, arguing that military courts constitute specialized tribunals comparable to labor courts or small claims courts, with expertise necessary to adjudicate matters specific to military operations. They emphasized that military procedures operate under shorter timeframes than civilian courts, are comparatively inexpensive given that military judges receive only militia compensation, and provide enhanced protections for the accused beyond those in ordinary procedure, including guaranteed legal counsel at no cost and the right to be heard in one's language.

A minority has contended that the military judiciary lacks democratic legitimacy, being appointed rather than elected, and that civilian courts could equally address military matters with appropriate expert consultation, as they do in countries such as France and Germany, which have abolished military justice systems.

== Bibliography ==
- Godel, Thierry; Bloque, Nicolas (2024). "Petit commentaire de la Procédure pénale militaire". UniDistance Suisse.
- Krafft, E. (1918). Justice militaire
- Haefliger, A. (1959). Kommentar zur Militärstrafgerichtsordnung
- Marti, H. (1965). Militärgerichtsbarkeit
- Steiner, B. (1983). Die eidgenössische Militärjustiz unter General Dufour im Sonderbundskrieg 1847/48
- La justice militaire suisse (1989)
