= Turkish Competition Authority =

Turkish Competition Authority Turkish: Rekabet Kurumu

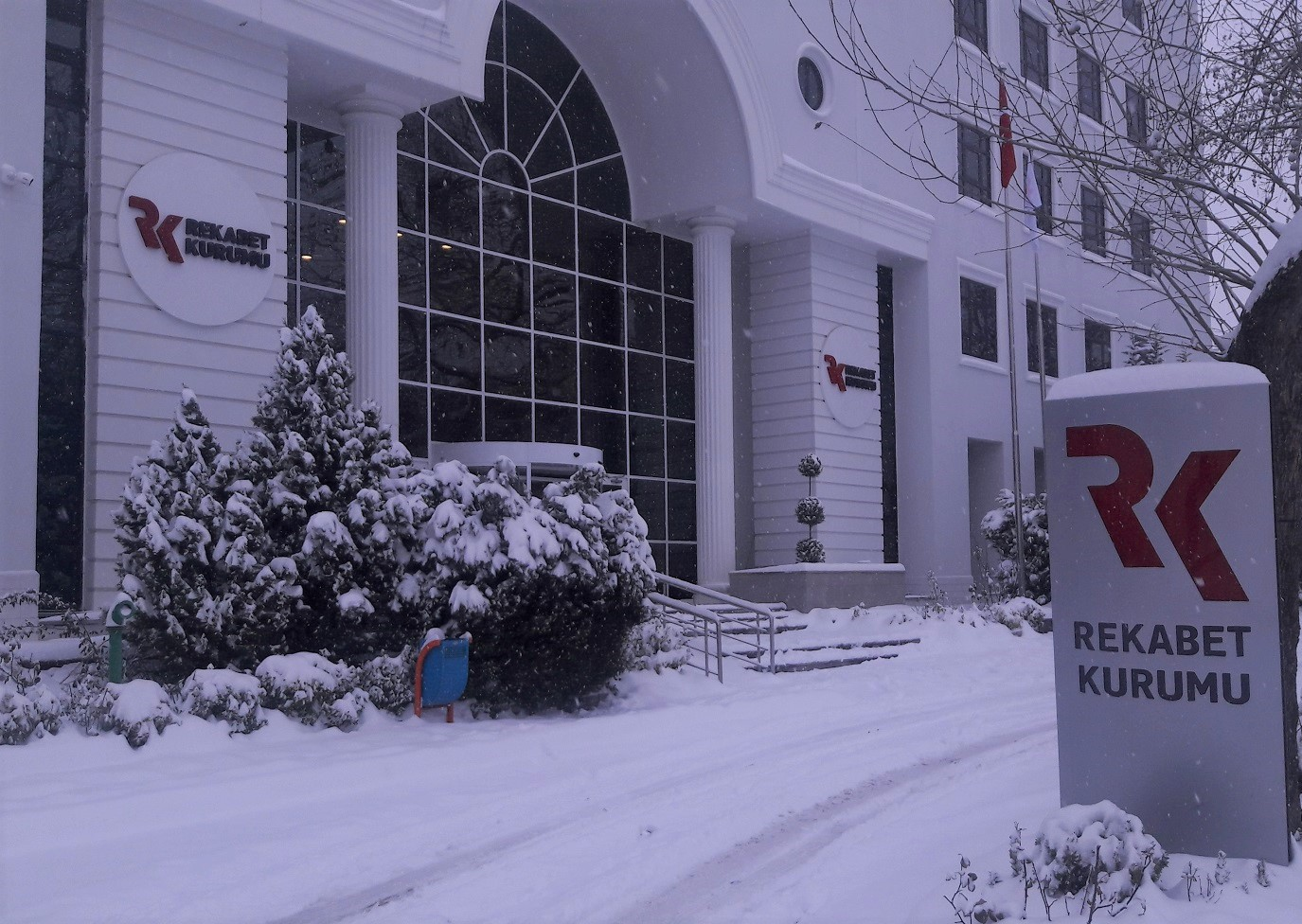
- Headquarters of Turkish Competition Authority in Ankara.

Agency overview
- Formed: December 13, 1994
- Type: Competition regulator
- Jurisdiction: Turkey
- Headquarters: Bilkent Plaza, B3 Blok, Çankaya, Ankara, Turkey
- Employees: 372
- Parent department: Ministry of Trade
- Website: rekabet.gov.tr

The Turkish Competition Authority (Turkish: Rekabet Kurumu, RK) is the competition regulator in Turkey. It is a government organization in Republic of Turkey Türkiye [ˈtyɾcije] which prevents any threats to the competitive process in the markets for goods and services through the use of the powers granted by law. Ensuring the fair allocation of resources and increasing social welfare by the protection of the competitive process constitutes the basic foundation of the mission of the Competition Authority.

== See also ==
- International Competition Network
