= Esther Koimett =

Kenyan investment banker (born 1957)

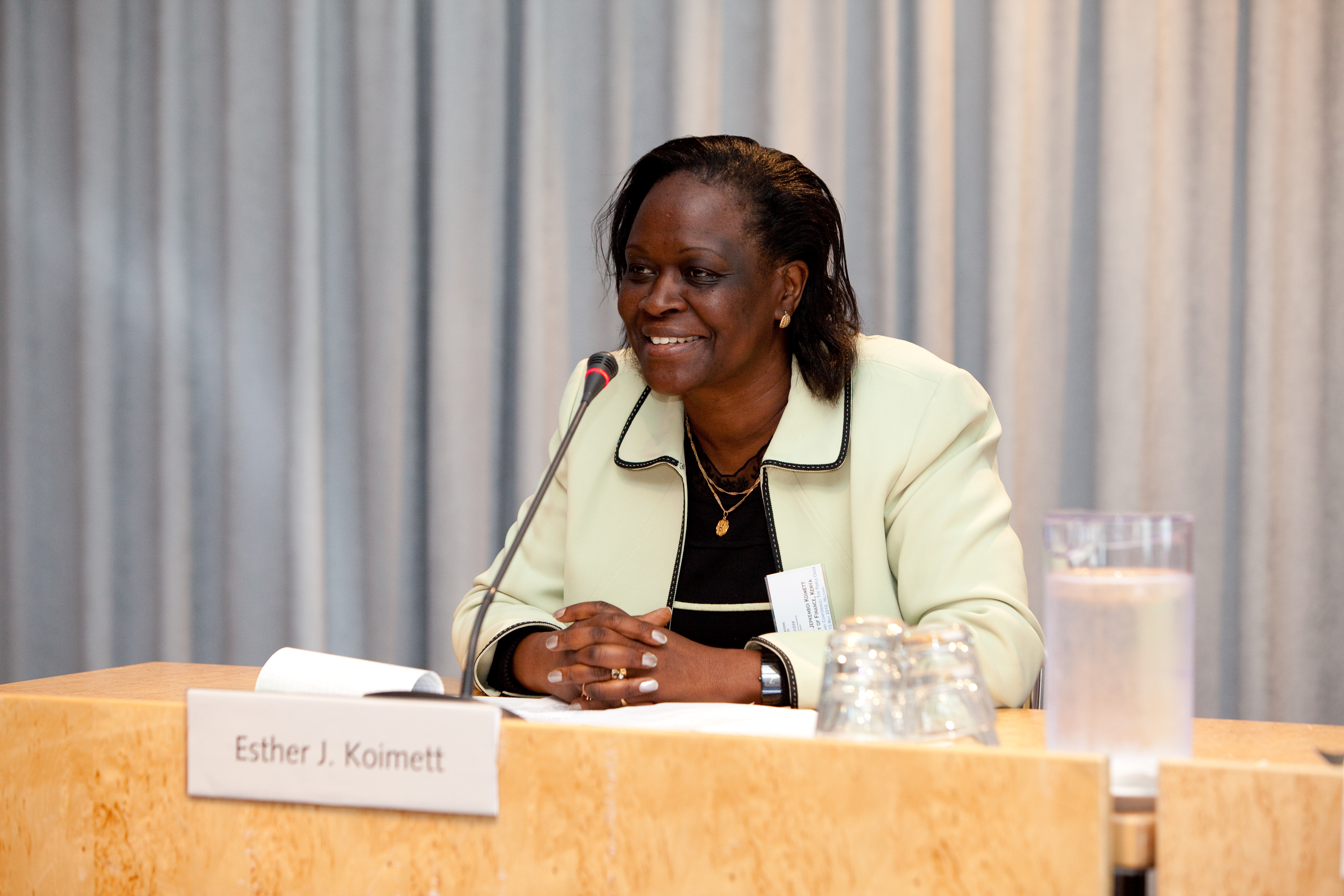
- Koimett in 2010
- Born: 1957 (age 68–69); Kenya
- Education: BCom; MBA
- Alma mater: University of Nairobi
- Occupation: Business executive
- Years active: 1980–present
- Employers: AAR Insurance Kenya; M-Pesa Holdings Co Ltd
- Title: CBS
- Children: 4
- Father: Nicholas Biwott

Esther Koimett is a Kenyan former public servant whose career has spanned investment promotion, banking, privatization, public enterprise, and public policy. She left public office in 2022 after serving as Principal Secretary Broadcasting and Telecommunication, Ministry of ICT, Innovation and Youth Affairs.

== Background and education ==
Koimett was born in Kenya circa 1967. She is the eldest child of Elizabeth Kattar and the late Cabinet Minister Nicholas Biwott. She holds a Bachelor of Commerce (BCom) degree and a Master of Business Administration (MBA) degree, both from the University of Nairobi.

== Career ==
Koimett has served as the principal secretary of the State Department of Broadcasting and Telecommunication, Ministry of ICT, Innovation and Youth Affairs since her appointment by former president Uhuru Kenyatta in January 2020. Prior to her appointment in the ICT docket, Koimett served as the principal secretary of the State Department for Transport, Ministry of Transport, Infrastructure, Housing, Urban Development & Public Works since her appointment in August 2018.

Koimett has also worked as the director general of Public Investment and Portfolio Management at the National Treasury. She served as the managing director and chief executive officer of the Kenya Post Office Savings Bank.

She has been instrumental in supporting the development of various notable policies in Kenya that include the amendment of the National ICT Policy Guidelines to spur and support the growth of business process outsourcing companies in Kenya. She was instrumental in the drafting of the Privatization Bill which was enacted into law in 2005.

== Work experience ==
Koimett has worked in public service for over 25 years. She has worked as the permanent secretary in the Ministry of Tourism and Information and as the managing director of Kenya Post Office Savings Bank. For at least 18 of those years, she was involved in investment promotion, public enterprise reform, and privatization.

She has been responsible for the divestiture of parastatal companies, either through the selection of a "strategic investor" or through the flotation of an IPO on the Nairobi Stock Exchange. Some of the companies privatized through this process include Kenya Reinsurance Corporation, Tourism Promotion Services, Kenya Railways Corporation, Kenya Airways, Kenya Commercial Bank Group, Housing Finance Group of Kenya, Mumias Sugar Company Limited, Kenya Electricity Generating Company and Safaricom.

As principal secretary of the State Department of Broadcasting and Telecommunications, she oversees all the state corporations under the Department, namely:

- Competition Authority of Kenya
- Postal Corporation of Kenya
- Kenya Broadcasting Corporation
- Media Council of Kenya
- Kenya Film Classification Board
- Kenya Film Commission
- Kenya Institute of Mass Communications
- Kenya Year Book Board

As PS, Transport, she was in charge of overseeing Kenya Airways and all the state corporations under the department, namely:

- Kenya Ports Authority
- Kenya Railways Corporation
- LAPSSET Corridor
- Kenya Airports Authority
- Kenya Civil Aviation Authority
- Kenya Ferry Services

== Other considerations ==
She has been a member of the boards of Kenya Railways Corporation, Telkom Kenya, Mumias Sugar Company Limited, Nairobi Stock Exchange, Safaricom, and the African Trade Insurance Agency (ATI).

== Personal life ==
Koimett is married with four children.
