= Competition regulator =

Government bodies enforcing fair competition

A competition regulator is the institution that oversees the functioning of markets. It identifies and corrects practices causing market impediments and distortions through competition law (also known as antitrust law). In general it is a government agency, typically a statutory authority, sometimes called an economic regulator, that regulates and enforces competition laws and may sometimes also enforce consumer protection laws. In addition to such agencies, there is often another body responsible for formulating competition policy.

Many nations implement competition laws, and there is general agreement on acceptable standards of behaviour. The degree to which countries enforce their competition policy varies substantially.

Competition regulators may also regulate certain aspects of mergers and acquisitions and business alliances and regulate or prohibit cartels and monopolies. Other government agencies may have responsibilities in relation to aspects of competition law that affect companies (e.g., the registrar of companies).

Regulators may form supranational or international alliances like the ECN (European Competition Network), the ICN (International Competition Network), and the OECD (Organisation for Economic Co-operation and Development).

== List of trade blocs and multinational regulators ==
Flag	Trade bloc	Regulating organization	ECA	ICN	OECD	Website	Language
	Common Market for Eastern and Southern Africa	COMESA Competition Commission					English
	Communidad Andina (Andean Community of Nations)						Spanish
(East African Community)	East African Community	East African Community Competition Authority					English
(ECOWAS)	ECOWAS	ECOWAS Regional Competition Authority					English, French, Portuguese
(Europe)	European Union /European Economic Area	European Commission – Directorate-General for Competition					See: Official languages of the European Union
	European Economic Area: Iceland, Norway, Liechtenstein (EFTA members)	EFTA Surveillance Authority					English

== List of national regulators ==
Flag	Country	Name	ECA	ICN	OECD	Website	Language
(Albania)	Albania	Competition Authority					Albanian, English
(Algeria)	Algeria	The Algerian National Competition Council					Arabic, French
(Argentina)	Argentina	Comision Nacional de Defensa de la Competencia					Spanish
(Armenia)	Armenia	State Commission for the Protection of Economic Competition of Armenia					Armenian, English
(Australia)	Australia	Australian Competition & Consumer Commission					English
(Austria)	Austria	Wettbewerbsbehörde im BMwA					German, English
(Azerbaijan)	Azerbaijan	State Service for Antimonopoly and Consumer Market Control					Azerbaijani, English
(Bangladesh)	Bangladesh	Bangladesh Competition Commission					Bangla, English
(Barbados)	Barbados	Fair Trading Commission					English
(Belgium)	Belgium	Raad voor de Mededinging/Conseil de la concurrence					French/Dutch
(Brazil)	Brazil	Administrative Council for Economic Defense					Portuguese
(Bulgaria)	Bulgaria	Commission for Protection of Competition					Bulgarian/English
(Canada)	Canada	Competition Bureau/Bureau de la concurrence				,	English/French
(Chile)	Chile	Tribunal de Defensa de la Libre Competencia -National Economic Prosecutor's Office					Spanish
(China)	China	State Administration for Market Regulation					Chinese
(Colombia)	Colombia	Superintendency of Industry and Commerce					Spanish
(Croatia)	Croatia	Croatian Competition Agency					Croatian, English
(Curaçao)	Curaçao	Fair Trade Authority Curaçao		X		[@]	English, Dutch, Papiamentu
(Cyprus)	Cyprus	Commission for the Protection of Competition					Greek, English
(Czech Republic)	Czech Republic	Office for the Protection of Competition					Czech, English
(Denmark)	Denmark	Konkurrencestyrelsen					Danish, English
(El Salvador)	El Salvador	Superintendencia de Competencia					Spanish
(Estonia)	Estonia	Konkurentsiamet (Estonian Competition Authority)					Estonian, English
(Finland)	Finland	Finnish Competition and Consumer Authority (Kilpailuvirasto)					Finnish, Swedish, English
(France)	France	Autorité de la concurrence					French
(Georgia (country))	Georgia	Competition Agency					Georgian, English
(Germany)	Germany	Bundeskartellamt					German
(Greece)	Greece	Hellenic Competition Commission					Greek, English
(Hong Kong)	Hong Kong	Competition Commission					Cantonese/English
(Hungary)	Hungary	Office of Economic Competition (Gazdasági Versenyhivatal)					Hungarian, English
(India)	India	Competition Commission of India					English
(Indonesia)	Indonesia	Commission for Supervision of Business Competition, (Komisi Pengawas Persaingan Usaha),					Indonesian, English
(Republic of Ireland)	Ireland	Competition and Consumer Protection Commission					English, Irish
(Iceland)	Iceland	Icelandic Competition Authority					Icelandic, English
(Iran)	Iran	National Iranian Competition Center (NICC)					Persian
(Israel)	Israel	Israel Anti-trust Authority					Hebrew, English
(Italy)	Italy	Autorità Garante della Concorrenza e del Mercato (AGCM)					Italian, English
(Japan)	Japan	Japan Fair Trade Commission (JFTC)					Japanese, English
(Jersey)	Jersey	Jersey Competition Regulatory Authority (JCRA)					English
(Jordan)	Jordan	Competition Directorate at the Ministry of Industry and Trade					Arabic, English
(Kazakhstan)	Kazakhstan	Agency of the Republic of Kazakhstan for Regulation of Natural Monopolies and Agency of the Republic of Kazakhstan for Competition Protection (Antimonopoly Agency)					Kazakh, English
(Kenya)	Kenya	Competition Authority of Kenya					English
(Kosovo)	Kosovo	Kosovo Competition Commission					English, Albanian, Serbian
(Latvia)	Latvia	Competition Council of Latvia (Konkurences padome)					Latvian, English
(Liechtenstein)	Liechtenstein	Office of National Economy (Amt für Volkswirtschaft)					German
(Lithuania)	Lithuania	Competition Council (Konkurencijos taryba)					Lithuanian, English
(Luxembourg)	Luxembourg	Conseil de la concurrence - Inspection de la Concurrence					French
(Malaysia)	Malaysia	Malaysia Competition Commission					English
(Malta)	Malta	Malta Competition and Consumer Affairs Authority					English
(Mexico)	Mexico	Mexican Federal Competition Commission					Spanish, English
(Morocco)	Morocco	Competition Council of Morocco					Arabic, French
(Moldova)	Republic of Moldova	Consiliul Concurenței (Competition Council)					Romanian, English
(Netherlands)	Netherlands	Autoriteit Consument & Markt					Dutch, English
(New Zealand)	New Zealand	Ministry of Commerce: Competition and Enterprise Branch and New Zealand Commerce Commission					English, Māori
(Nigeria)	Nigeria	Federal Competition and Consumer Protection Commission					English
(North Macedonia)	North Macedonia	Commission for Protection of Competition (Комисијата за заштита на конкуренцијата)					Macedonian, English
(Norway)	Norway	Konkurransetilsynet					Norwegian, English
(Pakistan)	Pakistan	Competition Commission of Pakistan					Urdu
(Peru)	Peru	Free Competition Commission					Spanish
(Philippines)	Philippines	Philippine Competition Commission					English
(Poland)	Poland	Office for Competition and Consumer Protection (Urząd Ochrony Konkurencji i Konsumentów)					Polish, English
(Portugal)	Portugal	Autoridade da Concorrência					English, Portuguese
(Romania)	Romania	Consiliul Concurenței (Competition Council)					Romanian, English
(Russia)	Russia	Federal Antimonopoly Service of Russia					Russian, English
(Singapore)	Singapore	Competition and Consumer Commission of Singapore					English
(Slovakia)	Slovakia	Antimonopoly Office					Slovak, English
(Slovenia)	Slovenia	Slovenian Competition Protection Agency					Slovenian, English
(South Africa)	South Africa	Competition Commission, South African Competition Tribunal					English
(South Korea)	South Korea	Fair Trade Commission					Korean, English
(Spain)	Spain	Comisión Nacional de la Competencia (CNC) before September 2007 Tribunal de Defensa de la Competencia (TDC)					Spanish
(Sweden)	Sweden	Konkurrensverket					Swedish, English
(Switzerland)	Switzerland	The Competition Council and Competition Commission (COMCO)					German, French, Italian
(Taiwan)	Taiwan	Fair Trade Commission					Mandarin, English
(Thailand)	Thailand	Trade Competition Commission					Thai, English
(Turkey)	Turkey	Rekabet Kurumu					Turkish, English
(Ukraine)	Ukraine	Anti-Monopoly Committee					Ukrainian, English
(United Kingdom)	United Kingdom	Competition and Markets Authority					English
(United States)	United States	Federal Trade Commission & United States Department of Justice Antitrust Division					English
(Venezuela)	Venezuela	Pro-Competencia					Spanish

== See also ==
- Consumer protection
- Transparency (market)
- Transparency (humanities)
