= Bidding =

Offer to set a price tag

Bidding is an offer (often competitive) to set a price tag by an individual or business for a product or service or a demand that something be done. Bidding is used to determine the cost or value of something.

Bidding can be performed by a person under influence of a product or service based on the context of the situation. In the context of auctions, financial transactions on international markets, or real estate, the price offer a business or individual is willing to pay is called a bid. In the context of corporate or government procurement initiatives. in Business and Law school students actively bid for high demand elective courses that have a maximum seat capacity though a course bidding process using pre allocated bidding points or e-bidding currency on course bidding systems. The price offer a business or individual is willing to sell is also called a bid. The term "bidding" is also used when placing a bet in card games. Bidding is used by various economic niches for determining the demand and hence the value of the article or property, in today's world of advanced technology, the Internet is a favoured platform for providing bidding facilities; it is a natural way of determining the price of a good in a free market economy.

Many similar terms that may or may not use the similar concept have been evolved in the recent past in connection to bidding, such as reverse auction, social bidding, or many other game-class ideas that promote themselves as bidding.

== Course bidding ==
Academic bidding is an online process that allows a student to select seats in courses or electives that have a seat availability constraint and a maximum cap enforced for each elective course.

The process of academic elective course bidding is extensively followed at some of the Top 100 Ranking business schools and law schools. Wherein students receive bid points (mostly uniformly or bid points are calculated on the basis of their CGPA), students may utilize these bid points to select courses and place winning bids on an online course bidding software platform during the bidding activities.

The process of bidding varies between different educational institutions, but overall the idea of winning places through an auction remains the same.

There are two main types of academic bidding

In a Closed Course bidding process students can allocate a calculated number of bidding points based on insights from historical winning bid averages. The student can then know whether his/her bid is successful only after the bidding round is complete.

The allocation of available bid points in closed bidding points thus may not be very efficient. But it allows students to place bids and participate in a bid process that has an extended time duration of a couple of hours to days.

In an Open Course bidding process, students are given insights about the exact winning bid required to win a seat at that particular moment in real-time. So they have the option to change/adjust bid points whenever necessary before a bidding round duration is complete. Hence students would be able to adjust winning bid points across high-demand courses and low-demand courses and successfully win a portfolio of courses. The bidding round durations in this case can be shorter durations from 15 minutes to 45 minutes.

The typical process sequence of conducting the course bidding activity using course bidding software includes the following rounds:

1. Course Bidding Round-1(Open / Closed bidding process)
2. Confirmation Round-1(Informs students on successful bids and of the winning courses )
3. Course Bidding Round-2 and Confirmation Round-2 (Allows students to bid for elective seats left after the bidding round - 1 and confirmation (Result Declaration) round round - 1 )
4. Waitlist Generation Round (Allows students to be on the waitlist for high-demand elective courses that they haven’t won using their leftover bids in Bidding round 1 and 2)
5. Add Drop Rounds (Allows performing final changes to students winning list, the student may drop some elective courses they won, the seats available in high demand courses may be given to students in waitlist order for that high demand course)

Note the Waitlist Generation might use a closed bidding process to rank students in the waitlist. The Add-Drop rounds allow efficient allocation of seats left after a bidding process.

== Online bidding ==
Bidding performs in two ways online: unique bidding and dynamic bidding.

Unique bidding: In this case, bidders place bids that are global unique bids which means that for the bid to be eligible, no other person can place the bid in this amount and the biddings are usually secret. There are two variants of this type of bidding : highest unique bidding and lowest unique bidding.

Dynamic bidding: This is a type of bidding where one user can set his bid for the product. Whether the user is present or not for the bidding, the bidding will automatically increase up to his defined amount. After reaching his bid value, the bidding stops from his side.

== Timed bidding ==
Timed bidding auctions allow users to bid at any time during a defined time period, simply by entering a maximum bid. Timed auctions take place without an auctioneer calling the sale, so bidders don't have to wait for a lot to be called. This means that a bidder doesn't have to keep his eye on a live auction at a specific time.

By entering a maximum bid, a user is indicating the highest he is willing to pay for a lot. An automated bidding service will bid on his behalf to ensure that he meets the reserve price, or that he always stays in the lead, up to his maximum bid. If someone else has placed a bid that is higher than the maximum bid, the will be notified, allowing he to change the maximum bid and stay in the auction. At the end of the auction, whoever's maximum bid is the most wins the lot.

Live bidding is a traditional room-based auction. These can be broadcast via a website where viewers can hear live audio and see live video feeds. The idea is that a bidder places their bid over the Internet in real-time. Effectively it is like being at a real auction, in the comfort of the home. Timed bidding, on the other hand, is a separate auction altogether, which allows bidders to participate without the need to see or hear the live event. It is another way of bidding, that is more convenient to the bidder.

== Bidding in procurement initiatives ==
Most large organizations have formal procurement organizations that acquire goods and services on their behalf. Procurement is a component of the broader concept of sourcing and acquisition. Procurement professionals increasingly realize that their make-buy supplier decisions fall along a continuum, from buying simple transactions to buying more complex and strategic goods and services (e.g. large scale outsourcing efforts). It is important for procurement professionals to use the appropriate sourcing model. There are seven models along the sourcing/bidding continuum: basic provider, approved provider, preferred provider, performance-based/managed services model, vested business model, shared services model and equity partnerships.

1. Basic provider: This transactional model is generally the best for low-value items with abundant supply and little complexity. The primary purpose is to gain access to goods at the lowest cost.
2. Approved provider: Second case of transactional model in which goods and services are provided by prequalified suppliers who meet certain criteria. To reach this status, suppliers often offer some advantages. Companies tend to shift to this model from the basic provider model when they seek for cooperation with fewer suppliers.
3. Preferred provider: Relational model that is suited for spend categories with an increased opportunity for meeting business objectives, therefore allowing to focus on strategy.
4. Performance-based/managed services model: These models combine a relational model with an output-based economic model. The widest usage is in the aerospace and defense industries.
5. Vested business model: A business model and mindset for creating highly collaborative business relationships. It is used to ensure getting the best absolute value through a transparent relationship with the possibilities for innovation.
6. Shared services model: Suited for large organizations with multiple business locations and units where there is opportunity to standardize and consolidate workscope.
7. Equity partnerships: This is a very formal contract approach due to the ownership structure. Setting up an equity partnership can be a very complicated and costly process.

== Bid construction problem ==
The Bid Construction Problem (BCP) or the Bid Generation Problem (BGP) is an NP-hard combinatorial optimization problem addressed by the bidder in order to determine items it is interested to bid on and the prices asked for acquiring these items. In transportation services procurement auctions, the BCP is addressed by the carrier to determine the set of profitable auctioned transportation contracts to bid on and their bidding prices. We distinguish two forms of the BCP depending in the nature of its parameters: deterministic vs stochastic.

== Bidding off the wall ==
Bidding off the wall, or taking bids from the chandelier, as it is sometime known, is where the auctioneer bids on behalf of the vendor.

This is allowed by law in some countries and states, and the auctioneer is allowed to bid on behalf of the vendor up to, but not including, the reserve price. In some cases, this may be extremely helpful for bidders because the reserve needs to be met.

For an example, suppose a property is coming up for auction and there is only one person interested in bidding for it in the room. The reserve has been set at $100,000, and this bidder is happy to buy it at $120,000. The bidding starts at $80,000. Without the auctioneer bidding on behalf of the vendor, it would never progress beyond that amount. However, because the auctioneer will take bids or generate bids of $85,000, the bidder then goes to $90,000 etc. If the bidder wants to, he may bid $100,000 and secure the property on the reserve price.

The result is that the vendor has sold the property at reserve and the purchaser has bought the property on the reserve price at less than he was prepared to pay. Without the auctioneer taking bids off the wall, this would never have happened.

All professional auctioneers do this with all types of auctions, including motor vehicles. As long as they are pushing it up towards the reserve price, then it is not an issue. If you don't want to bid at the price the auctioneer is asking, don't bid. If the goods don't meet the reserve and no-one but you wants to buy, then if the auctioneer didn't bid off the wall to meet the required price, the goods wouldn't be sold anyway.

== Joint bidding ==
Joint bidding, appearing in procurement tendering and auctions, is the practice of two or more similar firms submitting a single bid. Bidding consortia among potential competitors are the most common in public and private procurement and were used by some oil companies in U.S. auctions for offshore leases. Bidding consortia allow firms to get resources needed to formulate a valid bid. They may share information about the likely value of the contract based on forecasts or surveys, jointly bear fixed costs, or combine production facilities. In Europe, the regulation of joint bidding in procurement varies across countries. Mergers and joint ventures typically lead to a fewer number of competitors, thus resulting in higher prices for consumers.

== Issues and controversies ==
=== Bid rigging ===
Bid rigging is a form of collusion among firms intended to raise prices or lower the quality of goods or services offered in public tenders. In spite of it being illegal, this practice costs governments and taxpayers large sums of money. That is why the fight against bid rigging is a top priority in many countries. To detect bid rigging, national competition authorities rely on leniency programs. To reduce the dependency on the external sources, COMCO (Swiss Competition Commission) decided to initiate a long-term project in 2008 to develop a statistical screening tool.

This product was supposed to have the following properties: modest data requirements, simplicity, flexibility, reliable results. There are two possible approaches in general: structural methods for the empirical identification of markets prone to collusion and behavioral methods to analyze the concrete behavior of firms in specific markets. In the case of behavioral methods, a number of statistical markers are watched. The markers divide into price- and quantity-related markers.

The price-related markers use the information in the structure of the winning and losing bids to identify suspect bidding behavior. The quantity-related markers are meant to identify collusive behavior from developments in the market shares that seem not to be compatible with competitive markets. An example of a price-related marker is so called variance screen. Empirical papers show evidence that the price variability is lower in a collusive environment.

Markers are relatively easily applied even when only little information is known. On the other hand, there exist more complicated econometric detection methods which require firm-specific data.
