= Autoridade da Concorrência =

The Autoridade da Concorrência (AdC) is the Portuguese name for the country's competition regulator, an organisation established to ensure the enforcement of competition law in Portugal.

== History ==
It was launched in 2003, as an independent authority. Such independence is provided for in the Competition Law, and in its by-laws. The Authority must not accept guidance from the public, nor the private sectors.

== Leadership ==
The Authority's Presidents have been: Abel Mateus (2003–2008), Manuel Sebastião (2008–2013), António Ferreira Gomes (2013–2016), Margarida Matos Rosa (2016–2023), Nuno Cunha Rodrigues (2023- ).

== Membership ==
The AdC is a member of the European Competition Network, of the International Competition Network, of the Lusophone Competition Network and of the OECD's Competition Committee's Bureau.

== Notable cases ==
In 2017, AdC ruled to fine the Portugal's largest company, the utility EDP Group, 28.7 million euros ($31.54 million) and retailer Sonae 9.6 million euros for an illegal non-competition pact between their subsidiaries; under a 2012 agreement, Sonae had committed itself to not competing against EDP in electricity trading in Portugal for two years.

In 2019, AdC fined four insurance companies a total of 54 million euros ($59.6 million) for "cartel practices", with the biggest fines imposed on the local branch of Zurich Insurance Group and Portuguese insurer Lusitania.

Also in 2019, AdC fined 14 banks a total of 225 million euros ($248.6 million) for concerted practices of exchanging sensitive commercial information on credit products. The fines were imposed on Portugal's biggest bank at the time, Caixa Geral de Depósitos, as well as Millennium BCP, Banco Bilbao Vizcaya Argentaria BBVA, Banco BIC Português, Banco Português de Investimento (BPI), Banco Espírito Santo, BANIF, Barclays, Caixa de Credito Agricola, Banco Montepio, Banco Santander, Deutsche Bank and Unión de Créditos Inmobiliarios (UCI). In 2024, banks suffered a setback in appealing against their share of a €225 million cartel fine, after the EU's top court said the AdC was entitled to decide not to assess the impact of the information exchange (a by object infringement).

In 2020, AdC imposed fines worth a total 304 million euros on six supermarket chains, including retailers Sonae and Jerónimo Martins, and two beverage suppliers for illegally fixing prices between 2008 and 2017.

Also in 2020, the AdC fined Altice Portugal and Nowo in €84 million for fixing prices (i.e. setting a cartel). The sanction was later confirmed by both the Competition Tribunal and the Appeals Tribunal.

In 2024, the AdC issued €48 million in fines after concluding that the major laboratories in Portugal (Germano de Sousa, Redelab (part of Unilabs), Joaquim Chaves, Jorge Leitão Santos and Labeto laboratories, with the national association of laboratories equally found complicit) acted in a cartel by fixing prices, and agreeing to share the lab tests market, "especially during the pandemic, and with tests for Covid-19".

Also in 2024, the AdC fined SIBS in circa €14 million for abuse of dominant position in the payments' sector, effectively blocking competition.

A summary of recent cases was published by Global Competition Review in 2022.

== Ranking ==
During a 2016 to 2023 tenure, its then President, Margarida Matos Rosa, successfully led the Authority to the top 8 of antitrust enforcers, leaping from the top 40 in 2016.

== See also ==
- Competition law
- Competition policy
- Competition regulator
- Consumer protection
