= Fair Trade Commission =

Fair Trade Commission may refer to:

- Fair Trade Commission (Taiwan), a government agency of the Republic of China
- Fair Trade Commission (Japan)
- Fair Trade Commission (South Korea)
- Fair Trading Commission, a government agency of Barbados
