= National Commission for Competition Defense =

Argentina regulatory agency

National Commission for the Defense of Competition
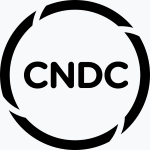

Agency overview
- Formed: August 1, 1980; 46 years ago
- Jurisdiction: Argentina
- Headquarters: Buenos Aires
- Employees: 91 (2020)
- Annual budget: 65.4 million pesos (2020)
- Agency executive: Alexis Pirchio, President
- Parent department: Ministry of Productive Development
- Website: www.argentina.gob.ar/defensadelacompetencia

The National Commission for Competition Defense (Spanish: Comisión Nacional de Defensa de la Competencia, CNDC) is the chief competition regulatory agency in Argentina. The CNDC operates within the Ministry of Productive Development and is tasked with curbing anti-competitive behavior in the Argentinian economy.

== History ==
The CNDC was established on August 1, 1980 in Law 22,262, where it was developed to function similar to European competition law as articulated in the Treaty of Rome. Under Law 22,262, violations of Argentine competition law constituted a criminal offense subject to scrutiny by a criminal court. During the 1990s, economic liberals argued that Law 22,262 was antiquated, and pushed for the adoption of the Argentine Competition Law (Law 25,156, ACL).

The ACL was adopted in 1994 and removed the possibility of criminal charges against violators of competition law. Instead, it created a new body, the National Tribunal for the Defence of Competition (Spanish: Tribunal de Defensa de la Competencia, TDC) to oversee punish competition law violations. As of 2020, the last time the CNDC blocked a merger was 2007, thirteen years prior.

=== Future ===
In 2018, legislation was enacted to create a new body to replace the CNDC, the National Competition Authority (Spanish: Autoridad Nacional de Competencia, NCA). However, as of 2021, this body has not come into effect.

== Functions ==
The CNDC is responsible for the "defense of competition against all forms of market distortion" as articulated in Article 42 of the Constitution. The CNDC advocates for consumer welfare under the logic that a competitive market economy leads to a high quality of goods and services and innovation. The CNDC is responsible for analyzing potential violations of competition law in certain markets and carrying out subsequent enforcement actions to curb anti-competitive behavior.

== Membership ==
The CNDC is made up of an agency president and four members. The members serve four year terms, subject to renewal. In addition to these officials, the CNDC also employs 91 personnel, including 40 attorneys and 25 economists. As of 2020, the agency's annual budget amounts to around 65.4 million pesos.

Rodrigo Luchinsky, a former law professor at the University of Buenos Aires who previously served as Undersecretary of Security under President Cristina Fernández de Kirchner, became president of the agency in 2020. In 2023, economist Alexis Pirchio was chosen by President Javier Milei to lead the agency.
