= European Competition Network =

== What is ==
The European Competition Network (ECN) consists of the 27 competition authorities within the European Union and the DG Competition of the European Commission.

== Relevant law ==
Council Regulation 1/2003 replaced the centralised notification and authorisation system with a decentralised system that is based on the parallel competence of the Commission and the national competition authorities and national courts of the Member States to enforce EU antitrust rules. It has created the European Competition Network (ECN), a forum for cooperation and coordination between the EU competition authorities (i.e. the Commission and the national competition authorities) on enforcement work and the basis for the creation and maintenance of a common competition enforcement culture in the EU.

Since 2004, the Commission and national competition authorities have adopted approximately 1500 decisions, investigating a broad range of cases in all sectors of the economy. From 2004 till 2021, more than 90% of the decisions that applied EU antitrust rules were taken by national competition authorities. Thus, it's essential that national competition authorities operate independently and have the powers to apply the EU antitrust rules effectively.

Regulation 1/2003 is the foundation for its creation and in Article 11 and 12 sets out the principles according to which the national competition authorities and the Commission can exchange information. According to Article 33 I b) 1/2003 the Commission is allowed to set out additional rules. The Commission did this by publishing the Notice on Cooperation within the Network of Competition Authorities.

Many favour ever more uniformity in the interpretation and application of EU competition norms and the procedures to enforce them under this system. However, when there are such differences in many Member States' policy preferences and given the benefits of experimentation, in 2020 one might ask whether more diversity (within limits) might not produce a more efficient, effective and legitimate competition regime.

== Member Authorities ==
The following national competition authorities, together with the European Commission's DG Competition, make up the ECN:

- Austria: Bundeswettbewerbsbehörde
- Belgium: Autorité Belge de la Concurrence
- Bulgaria: Комисия за Защита на Конкуренцията
- Croatia: Agencija za zaštitu tržišnog natjecanja (AZTN)
- Cyprus: Επιτροπή Προστασίας Ανταγωνισμού
- Czech Republic: Úřad pro ochranu hospodářské soutěže
- Denmark: Konkurrence- og Forbrugerstyrelsen
- Estonia: Konkurentsiamet
- Finland: Kilpailuvirasto
- France: [www.autoritedelaconcurrence.fr/en Autorité de la concurrence]
- Germany: Bundeskartellamt
- Greece: Hellenic Competition Commission
- Hungary: Gazdasági Versenyhivatal
- Ireland: Competition and Consumer Protection Commission
- Italy: Autorità Garante della Concorrenza e del Mercato
- Latvia: Konkurences padome
- Lithuania: Konkurencijos taryba
- Luxembourg: Conseil de la concurrence
- Malta: Malta Competition and Consumer Affairs Authority
- Netherlands: Authority for Consumers & Markets (ACM)
- Poland: Urzęd Ochrony Konkurencji i Konsumentów
- Portugal: Autoridade da Concorrência
- Romania: Consiliul Concurentei
- Slovakia: Protimonopolný úrad
- Slovenia: Urad Republike Slovenije za varstvo konkurence
- Spain: Tribunal de Defensa de la Competencia
- Sweden: Konkurrensverket

== Relevant articles and books ==
Regulation 1/2003 and EU Antitrust Enforcement: A Systematic Guide. In Regulation 1/2003 and EU Antitrust Enforcement: a Systematic Guide, (Dekeyser, Gauer, Laitenberger, Wahl, Wils and Prete eds.), Wolters Kluwer. Contributors: A. Scordamaglia-Tousis, A. La Pergola, C. Ritter & G.C. Rizza, L. Prete & M. Scholz, J. Holzwarth & T. Woolfson, E. Arsenidou, G. Meeßen, E. Barbier de la Serre, B. Lasserre, I. Pereira Alves, A. Bogdanov, K. Dekeyser & E. Van Ginderachter, C. Emin & M. Kadar, K. Strouvali & A. Vernet, F. Kaiser & S. Szekely, A. De Moncuit, M. Jaspers & C. Moriarty, J.P. Christienne, M. Kellerbauer, J. Jourdan, O. Guersent, S. Albaek & P. Régibeau, W. Wils, K. Lenaerts, M. van der Woude, I. de Silva, M. Matos Rosa, A. Mundt & A. Palacios Prieto, F. Jenny, E. De Smijter, P.A. Brink, R. Whish, P. Ibáñez Colomo, B.E. Hawk, L. Ortiz Blanco & A. Lamadrid, I. Daems, J. Padilla, A. Reyna & V. Turner

== See also ==
- European competition law
