= Militia System =

Organizational principle in Switzerland

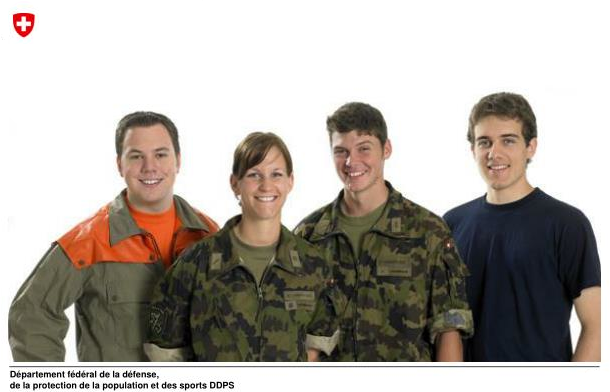
Various types of militia commitment (civil protection, army, other)

The militia system, also known as the militia principle, is a common organizational principle in Swiss public life. In the Swiss model of society, the militia system forms a central pillar alongside direct democracy, federalism and concordance.

In practice, it encompasses political and military affairs, and extends to other areas of general interest, such as communal tasks or disaster management.

== Notion ==
The militia principle is based on the republican idea that capable citizens should take on public duties and tasks in an extra-professional and honorary capacity (ehrenamtlich). Militia involvement thus constitutes temporary, part-time or voluntary service to the community.

From the perspective of the democratic ideal, popular sovereignty thus encompasses not only participation in decision-making on public affairs (self-determination), but also in their execution (self-management).

=== Legal basis ===
The militia principle is a maxim of public organization which, like the principle of democracy, is not exhaustively codified. It is a constitutive principle of the state (staatstragendes Prinzip).

At federal and constitutional level, however, the militia principle is derived from the principle of subsidiarity (art. 5a of the Federal Constitution), from the call for individual and social responsibility (art. 6 Federal Constitution), and is explicitly enshrined in the organization of the army in art. 58 para. 1 Federal Constitution.

=== Distinction from voluntary work ===
Militia activity differs from voluntary activity mainly in its degree of institutionalization: militia activity is always carried out in a field recognized by law as being of public interest, and in a special legal relationship with the public community.

In practice, however, there are many overlaps between voluntary and militia activity.

== Origins of the militia system ==
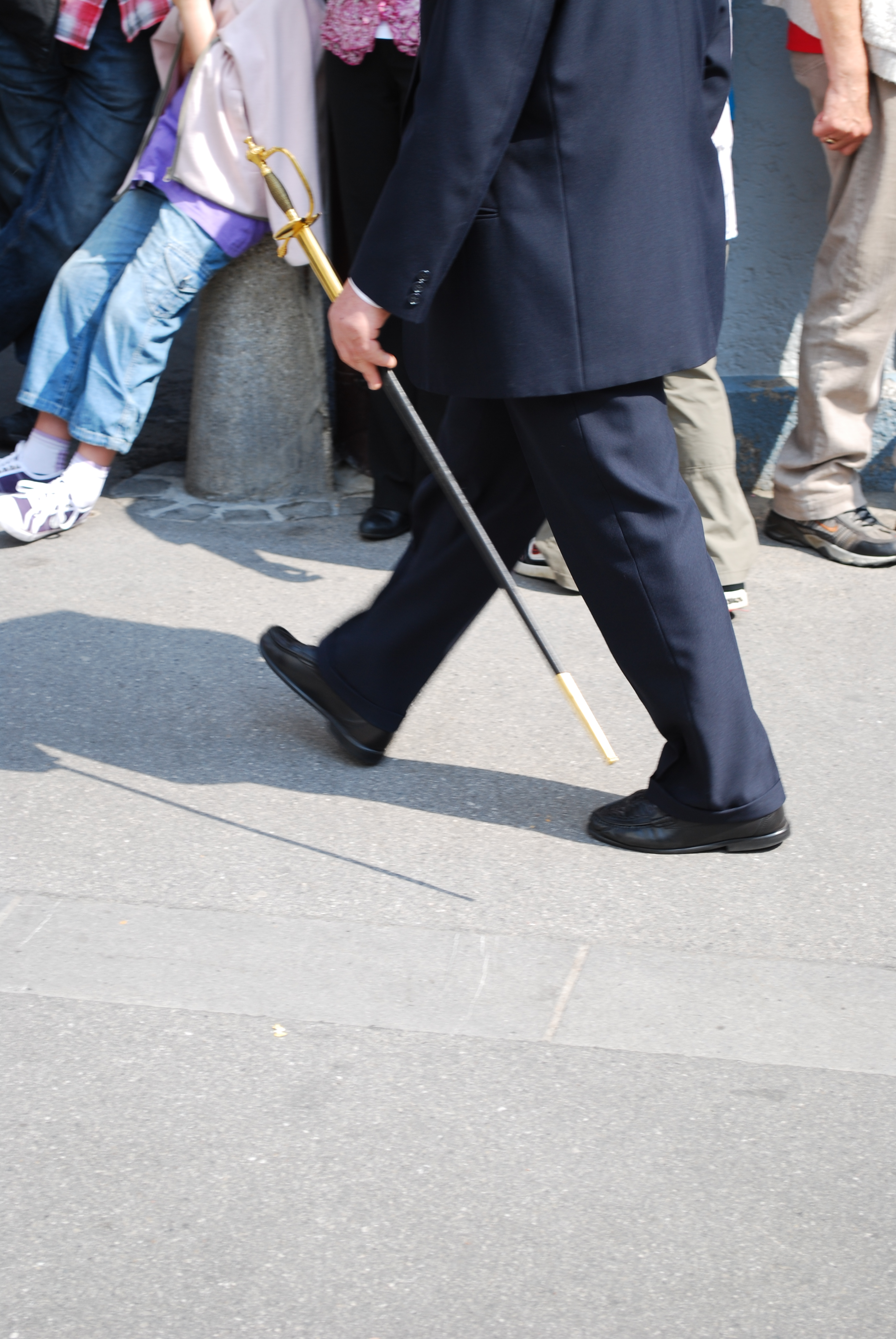
Country parish saber as a symbol of military capability: "Citoyen-soldat" (Citizen-soldier)

The term "militia" derives from the Latin root militia (domain of war, military service).

Historically, the militia principle is based on the idea of the citizen-soldier, which originated in Antiquity and was reappropriated in modern times, particularly during the French Revolution.

In Athenian democracy and the early Roman Republic, the term was also used to designate the exercise of civil office. Free landowners, who were able to defend themselves independently, pooled their efforts and responsibilities in the people's assembly to guarantee the sovereignty of their lands.

Expansion into the political realm took place during the Ancien Régime period. The right to participate in community decisions went hand in hand with the duty to defend it.

In Switzerland, militia spirit, as individual responsibility towards the group, was a long-standing tradition, introduced to the population of rural communities and confederal regions in the late Middle Ages, as witnessed by the Federal Charter of 1291. At that time, mutual aid was widespread in the form of various cooperative organizations, and echoed the Christian duty of assistance (Caritas).

Swiss Enlightenment pioneers (e.g. Béat Louis de Muralt, Isaac Iselin) established that courage, frugality, mutual aid, confidence in one's own judgment and rejection of worldly artifice were essential republican values for building a national consciousness and a communalist state structure in Switzerland. As early as 1830, the militia system was enshrined in the cantonal constitutions, particularly in favor of the communes and their autonomy.

== Application of the militia principle ==
In organizational terms, the militia principle is implemented through voluntary service on the one hand, and the obligation to serve (Dienstpflicht) on the other.

According to the Federal Court, the militia principle could not be implemented without general conscription, and the obligation to serve is therefore the necessary complement to the militia principle.

=== Volunteer militia ===
Voluntary militia activities are numerous in Swiss public life, reflecting their essential role in the federalist model of direct democracy.

==== Political authorities ====
At cantonal and communal level, militiamen and women form the legislative body, sometimes even the executive authority in smaller communes.

At federal level, the Federal Assembly is also known as the "militia parliament". In practice, however, this assertion is undermined.

Most members of the Federal Assembly, i.e. Switzerland's two legislative chambers (National Council and Council of States), have a job in addition to their parliamentary activity, as do members of parliament at cantonal and communal level. However, recent studies show that only just over 10% of National Council members devote less than a third of their working time to a parliamentary mandate, and can therefore be described as "parliamentary militiamen" in the strict sense. This category has now de facto disappeared completely in the Council of States: the majority of members devote more than two-thirds of their working time to a parliamentary mandate. Federal legislative power is therefore a mixture of militia activity and professional politics.

==== Administrative authorities ====
The Competition Commission (COMCO) is a federal militia authority, responsible for the enforcement of Swiss competition law, and consists of a college of twelve people, acting on a militia basis.

==== Community life ====
In the communes, and more so in the smaller ones, most official offices (school maintenance, social services, audit commission, civil engineering and works commission, building commission, property commission, culture commission, landscaping concept commission, electoral office, etc.) are carried out by militia authorities. In 2019, there were around 100,000 people directly involved in local political life, i.e. almost 1 in 50 eligible voters.

=== Mandatory militia ===
==== On the federal level ====
Mandatory militia refers to the male military service obligation (art. 58 para. 1 in conjunction with art. 59 para. 1 of the Federal Constitution) and, by extension, to the alternative services to military service, i.e. civil service (for conscripts who are fit for the army but conscientious objectors) and civil protection (for conscripts who are unfit for the army).

The Swiss army is made up of soldiers and officers with civilian occupations who are called up for military service on a weekly basis or in block for a certain number of years. Switzerland does not have a standing army in peacetime, as troops are mainly called up for training purposes.

==== At cantonal and municipal level ====
Militia activities are compulsory in Swiss cantons and municipalities, for example:

- fire departments and fire service activities in Canton Zug, Canton St. Gallen, Canton Lucerne, Canton Thurgau, Canton Jura, Canton Fribourg, etc.
- communal chores in the Commune of Auborangess (FR).

In such cases, the obligation to serve generally extends to all residents of a certain age group, whether male or female, Swiss or foreign.

== Difficulties ==
Militia activity remains important in Switzerland. However, there are many shortcomings in terms of both quantity and quality, for example among volunteer firefighters or in communal mandates.

Voluntary, extra-professional and honorary responsibility for public tasks and duties is generally not, or only partially, remunerated. Where militia activity is replaced by professionalization (external evaluation of schools, child and adult protection authorities, etc.), costs are several times higher and social acceptance is lower, because the militia is rooted in the population.

Municipal mergers also have a negative impact on militia involvement, as people feel less attached to the new, larger communities, and therefore feel less responsible for them.

=== Proposed solutions ===
==== Militia work year ====
The Association of Swiss Communes is determined to strengthen the militia system so that it remains sustainable, because the political system in Switzerland lives, at every level, on the participation and commitment of its citizens: it declared 2019 the "Year of Militia Work". To this end, platforms were created to provide and receive impetus, in a transdisciplinary and participatory approach.

==== Citizen service ====
On April 26, 2022, a federal popular initiative was launched by the association servicecitoyen.ch with a view to introducing citizen service, i.e. an obligation to serve in the army, civil protection or civilian service for any person of nationality, to replace the military and male obligation to serve. The aim of this project was to further develop the militia system and revitalize its spirit, beyond military service.

== See also ==
- Swiss Civilian Service
- Politics of Switzerland

=== In general ===
- Home guard
- Civil defense
- Paramilitary
