= Fair Trading Commission =

Agency overview
- Formed: 2 January 2001
- Preceding agency: Public Utilities Board
- Jurisdiction: Barbados
- Headquarters: Good Hope, Green Hill Saint Michael, Barbados
- Agency executives: Tammy Bryan, Chairperson; Donley Carrington, Deputy Chairperson
- Parent agency: Ministry of Energy and Business Development
- Website: Fair Trading Commission

The Fair Trading Commission (FTC) is a Barbadian independent government agency under the Ministry of Energy and Business Development. It is responsible for competition policy, trade practices, formulating fair trade policy, laws, regulations and investigating activities restricting competition, such as monopolies, mergers, collusions, and other unfair trade practices on the part of enterprises. It also determines principles, rates and standards of service for regulated service providers.

== History ==
In 1955, the Public Utilities Board was established within Barbados to help regulate various public utilities. However, by the turn of the century, it was determined that there was a need for a regulatory body with a wider mandate to help regulate areas such as business competition and consumers rights in general.

The Fair Trading Commission Act was passed on 31 December 2001 by the Owen Arthur administration to address these new requirements. The act came into force on 2 January 2001, replacing the Public Utilities Board with the Fair Trading Commission.

== Primary Duties ==
- Determining principles, rates and standards of service for regulated service providers;
- Monitoring general business conduct
- Investigating possible breaches of the Acts administered by the FTC.
- Educating and informing businesses and consumers about the requirements of these Acts.
- Taking enforcement action when needed

== Chairpersons ==
- Jefferson Cumberbatch (2015–2018)
- Tammy Bryan (2018–present)

== See also ==
- Economy of Barbados
- Competition regulator
