= Competition Commission (Hong Kong) =

Hong Kong statutory organisation

- 競爭事務委員會

Competition regulator overview
- Formed: 14 June 2012; 14 years ago
- Jurisdiction: Hong Kong
- Headquarters: 19/F, South Island Place, 8 Wong Chuk Hang Road, Wong Chuk Hang, Hong Kong
- Competition regulator executives: JAT Sew-tong, Chairman; Rasul Butt, Chief Executive Officer; Patrick Kwok, PDSM, Executive Director (Operations); Gary Shiu, Executive Director (Policy & Advocacy); Lester Lee, Executive Director (Legal Services)
- Website: Competition Commission

Competition Commission
- Traditional Chinese: 競爭事務委員會（競委會）
- Simplified Chinese: 竞争事务委员会（竞委会）
Transcriptions
Standard Mandarin
- Hanyu Pinyin: Jìngzhēng shìwù wěiyuánhuì (jìng wěi huì)

The Competition Commission is the independent statutory body charged with regulating competition in Hong Kong. It was established under the Competition Ordinance (Cap. 619), enacted in June 2012, which aims to prohibit conduct that prevents, restricts or distorts competition, and to prohibit mergers that substantially lessen competition in Hong Kong.

The headquarters is located in Wong Chuk Hang, Hong Kong.

== Responsibilities ==
The Competition Commission is responsible for the following:

- To investigate conduct that may contravene the competition rules of the Ordinance and enforce the provisions of the Ordinance;
- To promote public understanding of the value of competition and how the Ordinance promotes competition;
- To promote the adoption by undertakings carrying on business in Hong Kong of appropriate internal controls and risk management systems and to ensure their compliance with the Ordinance;
- To advise the Government on competition matters in Hong Kong and outside Hong Kong;
- To conduct market studies into matters affecting competition in markets in Hong Kong; and
- To promote research into and the development of skills in relation to the legal, economic and policy aspects of competition law in Hong Kong.

== History ==
On September 3, 2014, Dr. Stanley Wong was appointed the Chief Executive of the Competition Commission. He had previous experience working was a lawyer in Canada, and advised on all aspects of competition law including cartels, anti-competitive unilateral conduct, mergers and private actions. He also served as a counsel before the Supreme Court of Canada, appellate and trial courts and the Canadian Competition Tribunal.

On July 17, 2015, the Competition Ordinance (Cap. 619) was revised and set to take effect on December 14, 2015. It expanded to prohibit anti-competitive behavior of small and medium-sized enterprises to maintain and improve the competitive environment.

On November 2, 2015, the Competition Commission issued a practical toolkit - "How to comply with the Competition Ordinance" to assist the business community, especially small and medium enterprises (SMEs), to review their business practices.

On November 19, 2015, the Commission published two documents, "Enforcement Policy" and "Leniency Policy for Undertakings Engaging in Cartel Conduct (Cartel Leniency Policy)" to provide further details of how the Commission intends to carry out its enforcement function under the Competition Ordinance (Ordinance).

On December 14, 2015, the amendments to the Competition Ordinance (Cap. 619) came into effect.

== Cases ==
The Competition Commission has taken legal action against companies engaging in anti-competitive behaviour.

The Competition Commission's first case since the full implementation of the Competition Ordinance (Cap. 619) in 2015 was in 2018. The commission took five information technology companies to the tribunal for alleged bid rigging involving a tender issued by a social services organisation.

In 2020, the Competition Commission launched proceedings against an IT company over accusations that they colluded with another business when bidding for a project at Ocean Park. In the same year, the commission handed out its first penalties by fining 10 contractors for “serious anticompetitive conduct” through market sharing and fixing prices for home renovations on a public housing estate. Tribunal president Godfrey Lam said the 10 firms restricted competition and ordered each to pay between HK$132,000 and HK$740,000 to government.

In 2021, the Competition Commission took two cleaning companies to a tribunal over allegations they colluded during tendering when bidding for HK$180 million (US$23 million) worth of service contracts to clean public housing estates.

== See also ==
- Economy of Hong Kong
- Competition regulator
- Competition law
