= Competition Authority of Kenya =

Kenyan Regulator

Authority overview
- Formed: 1 August 2011
- Preceding Authority: Monopolies and Prices Commission
- Type: Statutory body
- Jurisdiction: Kenya
- Headquarters: CBK Pension Towers, 15th Floor, Harambee Avenue, Nairobi
- Authority executives: Shaka Kariuki (Chairman); David Kibet Kemei (Director General)
- Parent department: Ministry of Finance (Kenya)
- Website: cak.go.ke

The Competition Authority of Kenya is the principal competition regulator and consumer protection enforcement agency in Kenya. It is an independent parastatal whose parent ministry is the Ministry of Finance (Kenya).

== History ==
The Competition Authority was established on 1 August 2011, when Kenya's Competition Act 2010 came into force. The Competition Act replaced the Restrictive Trade Practices, Monopolies and Price Control Act of 1989, Cap 504. The Competition Act has since been chaptered as Cap 504 of the Laws of Kenya.

== Responsibilities ==
- Consumer protection
- Control of mergers and acquisitions
- Deterring anti-competitive practices
- Sanctioning and preventing abuse of buyer power
