= Covenant of Sempach =

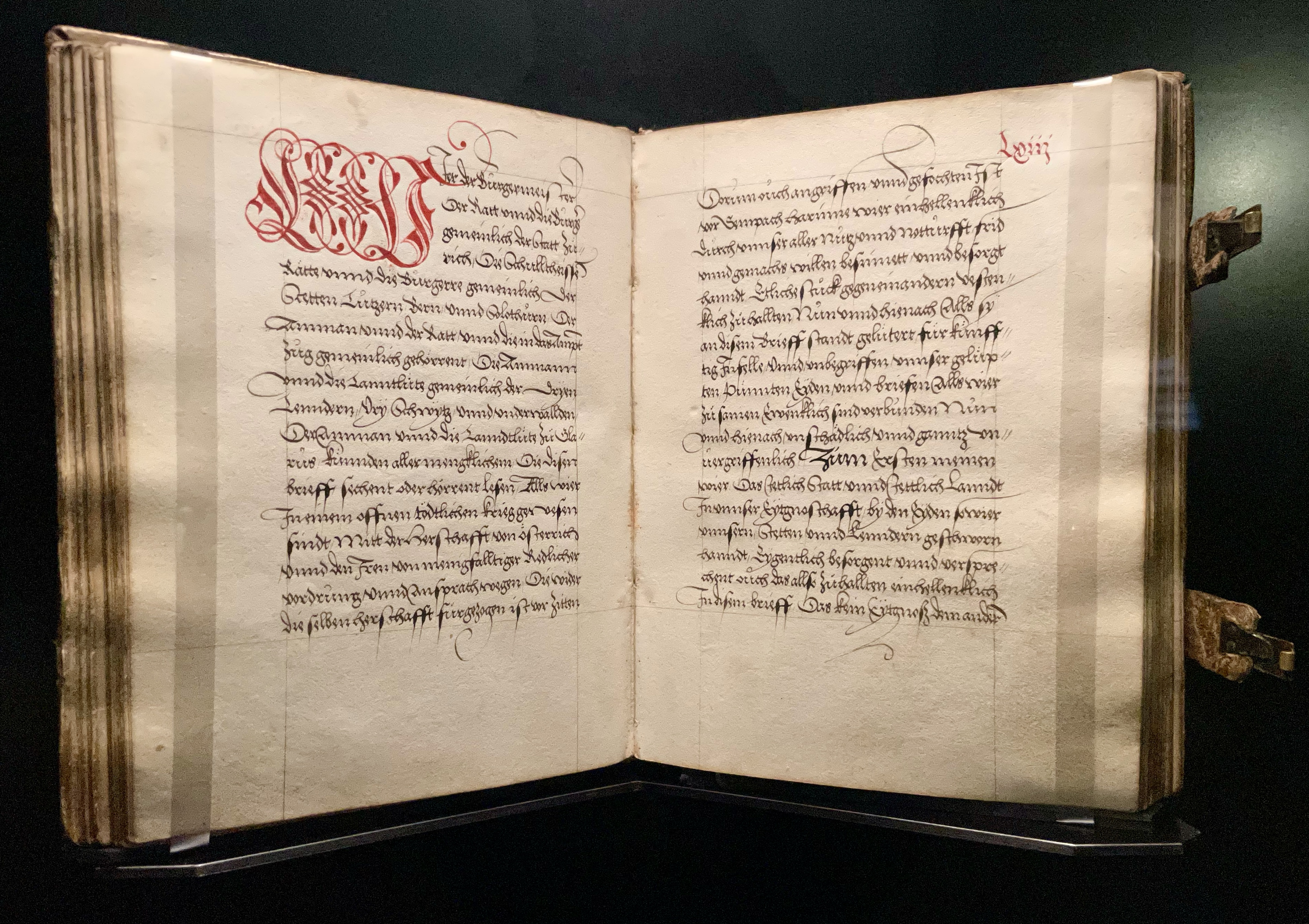
- Type: Confederate military and political agreement
- Context: Response to the Battle of Sempach (1386)
- Signed: 10 July 1393
- Location: Switzerland
- Replaced by: Peace of Twenty Years (1394)
- Signatories: Zurich, Lucerne, Berne, Solothurn, Zug, Uri, Schwyz, Unterwald, and Glarus
- Language: Middle High German, Middle French

The Covenant of Sempach was an agreement concluded on 10 July 1393 between the cantons of Zurich, Lucerne, Berne, Solothurn, Zug, Uri, Schwyz, Unterwald, and Glarus.

== Background ==
The covenant was agreed upon in response to the war of Sempach of 1386. Following the death of Leopold III at the Battle of Sempach, his brother Albert III, Duke of Austria took leadership of the House of Habsburg and sought to reduce tensions with the Confederates. Peace treaties signed in 1387 and 1389 helped ease the conflict between the Habsburgs and the Swiss Confederates.

The agreement became necessary after Zurich concluded a separate alliance with Austria on 4 July 1393. In response, other cantons, supported by popular sentiment in Zurich, orchestrated a coup known as the Schöno affair, in which the pro-Austrian burgomaster Rudolf Schön was deposed. The new authorities brought Zurich back into alignment with the Confederates and renounced the Austrian alliance.

== Terms and provisions ==
In exchange for Zurich's return to the Confederate fold, the signatories agreed to adopt more disciplined conduct on the battlefield in both private feuds and public wars. The covenant prohibited all recourse to violence between Confederates and guaranteed merchant safety.

The agreement established several specific requirements. Military assistance could only be requested for justified military campaigns presented by responsible authorities (Landsgemeinde or Council). During joint military expeditions, peace was to reign among participants. Deserters and marauders were to be tried, and plunder was permitted only after victory was assured, with churches, monasteries, and women to be spared. The division of booty was to be managed by captains.

These provisions reflected the harsh realities of warfare in the late 14th century.

== Aftermath ==
Following the conclusion of the covenant, renewed negotiations between the Confederates and Austria became possible. This led to the "Peace of Twenty Years" (1394), in which Zurich played a decisive role as guarantor of the proper conduct of the Central Swiss cantons.

== Bibliography ==
- Stettler, B., "Der Sempacher Brief von 1393 - ein verkanntes Dokument aus der älteren Schweizergeschichte", RSH, vol. 35, 1985, pp. 1–20
