= Margarida Matos Rosa =

Portuguese economist and leader

Margarida Matos Rosa is a Portuguese economist. She led the Portuguese Competition Authority between 2016 and 2023.

== Education ==
Matos Rosa graduated in economics at the University of Louvain, and in public and international affairs at Princeton University. She was a Fulbright scholar at MIT.

== Career ==
Matos Rosa was president of the Board of the Portuguese Competition Authority between 2016 and 2023.

She has, since then, been a Governing Board member at the Association of Princeton Graduate Alumni, where she oversees its Lifelong Learning Initiative, Regional Engagement, and Governance. She advises and consults in the fields of economic policy, financial affairs, antitrust enforcement, and the European Union’s integration through its Single Market. She has taught in academia on the topic of the European digital regulation, as well as on antitrust policy and enforcement.

Prior to these roles, she worked for the Portuguese Securities Market Commission, heading the investment management department. Matos Rosa also has wide experience in the financial private sector (BNP Paribas, Santander Investment and UBS Bank) in the areas of economic research, investment banking and investment management.

== Achievements ==
During her tenure, the Autoridade da Concorrência (or AdC, the authority's designation in Portuguese) raised its profile both domestically and internationally. Her leadership raised the AdC's to one of the top eight antitrust authorities worldwide. Simultaneously, Margarida Matos Rosa was designated Vice-President of the International Competition Network (ICN), responsible for economic growth and inflation issues.

Her role is seen as the most effective of the history of the Authority, which was launched in 2003, by experts in the antitrust field. She was compared in Portugal to Margrethe Vestager, former Vice-President of the European Commission.

She was, during her term, considered one of the top 38 most powerful people in Portugal. In 2021, she was ranked #11 most influential woman in Portugal

== Publications ==
=== Book chapters ===
- Matos Rosa, M. (2023), The EU competition procedures from the perspective of national competition authorities. In Regulation 1/2003 and EU Antitrust Enforcement: a Systematic Guide, (Dekeyser, Gauer, Laitenberger, Wahl, Wils and Prete eds.), Wolters Kluwer.
- Matos Rosa, M. (2022), Anticompetitive Practices in the Financial Sector, in Competition Case Law Digest: a synthesis of EU, US and national leading cases (Jenny and Charbit eds.) Concurrences.
- Matos Rosa, M. (2020), The Portuguese legislative framework regarding remedies: overview. Chapter 13 in Remedies in EU Competition Law: Substance, Process and Policy (Gérard and Komninos eds). Wolters Kluwer.
- Matos Rosa, M. (2020), The ICN at 20: Looking ahead, in ICN@20 (Lugard and Anderson eds.). At: http://internationalcompetitionnetwork.org/wp-content/uploads/2022/03/20Anni-AdC.pdf
- Matos Rosa, M. (2019), Los efectos de red potenciados por el big data: desafíos para la política de competencia, in Desafíos de la Libre Competencia em Iberoamérica (ed. Ana Montoya), Legal Publishing Chile.
- Matos Rosa, M. (2018), Foreword, in Vertical Agreements in EU Competition Law (Wijckmans, Tuytschaever, Anastácio and Whyte eds).
- Matos Rosa, M. (2018), Foreword, in Lei da Concorrência – Comentário Conimbricense (Porto, Cruz Vilaça, Cunha, Gorjão-Henriques, Anastácio eds). Almedina.

=== Journals ===
- Matos Rosa, M. (2024), Enforcement in Digital Markets, in European Regulatory Transformation - DMA, DSA, and beyond, Journal of Antitrust Enforcement. Oxford University Press.
- Matos Rosa, M. (2024), International antitrust enforcement: the case for more, Journal of European Competition Law and Practice, Oxford University Press.
- Matos Rosa, M. (2023), Industrial policy, in Global Dictionary of Competition Law, Concurrences: https://www.concurrences.com/en/dictionary/industrial-policy
- Matos Rosa, M. (2022), Benefícios da Concorrência na Contratação Pública, in Revista do Tribunal de Contas, nº 4. https://revista.tcontas.pt/edicoes/rtc_2022_04/estudo-01.html
- Matos Rosa, M. (2021), Anticompetitive practices in the financial sector: An overview of EU and national case law, Concurrences. Available at : https://www.concurrences.com/en/bulletin/special-issues/anticompetitive-practices-in-the-financial-sector/anticompetitive-practices-in-the-financial-sector-an-overview-of-eu-and-en
- Matos Rosa, M. (2020), Agency Insight from Portugal’s Autoridade da Concorrência, Journal of Antitrust Enforcement, Oxford University Press. At: https://academic.oup.com/antitrust/article/8/2/233/5836003
- Matos Rosa, M. (2020), EU Competition Law: on the Evolutionary Path, Journal of European Competition Law and Practice, Oxford University Press. At: https://academic.oup.com/jeclap/article-abstract/11/8/404/5920691?redirectedFrom=fulltext
- Matos Rosa, M. (2019), Achieving Competition within Industrial Policy, Journal of European Competition Law and Practice, Oxford University Press. At: https://academic.oup.com/jeclap/article/10/8/451/5539286
- Matos Rosa, M. (2018), Achieving Competition in the Financial Sector, Journal of European Competition Law and Practice, Vol. 9, No. 7, Oxford University Press. At: https://academic.oup.com/jeclap/article/9/7/421/5073306?login=false
- Matos Rosa, M. (2000), Grèce: Aux portes de l'euro, Problèmes économiques n° 2665 2000, 17 mai p. 26-30. At: https://documentation.insp.gouv.fr/doc/SYRACUSE/187350#enrichissements
- Matos Rosa, M. (2000), La dynamique ibérique, in Conjoncture Paribas, pp. 46-48.
- Matos Rosa, M. (1999), Bulletin de santé de l’euro : l’optimisme des premiers résultats, Conjoncture Paribas, pp. 10-20.

=== Institutional publications ===
- Matos Rosa, M. (2023). Merger control: recent developments in Portugal, GVH-OECD Regional Centre for Competition. Review No. 22, October 2023. https://www.oecd.org/content/dam/oecd/en/networks/regional-centre-for-competition-in-eastern-europe-and-central-asia/oecd-gvh-centre-newsletter-jan-2025.pdf/_jcr_content/renditions/original./oecd-gvh-centre-newsletter-jan-2025.pdf
- Matos Rosa et al (2014), Securities Markets Risk Outlook. IOSCO. At: https://www.iosco.org/library/pubdocs/pdf/IOSCOPD453.pdf
- Matos Rosa et al (2013), Securities Markets Risk Outlook. IOSCO. At: https://www.iosco.org/library/pubdocs/pdf/IOSCOPD426.pdf
- Matos Rosa et al (2011), Mitigating Systemic Risk: a Role for Securities Regulators. Discussion paper, IOSCO. At: https://www.iosco.org/library/pubdocs/pdf/IOSCOPD347.pdf
- Matos Rosa et al (2011), Report on Trading of OTC Derivatives. IOSCO. At: https://www.iosco.org/library/pubdocs/pdf/IOSCOPD345.pdf

=== Interviews ===
- O FEPiano (2023), A defesa da concorrência. Entrevista a Margarida Matos Rosa, FEPiano nº 49 (Agosto). Faculdade de Economia da Universidade do Porto. https://www.fink.pt/entrevistas/entrevista-a-margarida-matos-rosa/
- Concurrences (2023): Margarida Matos Rosa. Overview of a vigorous term at the AdC and some thoughts on trending competition topics. At: https://www.concurrences.com/en/review/issues/no-1-2023/interview/margarida-matos-rosa-portuguese-competition-authority-overview-of-a-vigorous
- Global Competition Review (2023): Margarida Matos Rosa: the exit interview. At: https://globalcompetitionreview.com/article/margarida-matos-rosa-the-exit-interview
- LTE Magazine (2020): https://lte.ma/lentretien-de-lte-magazine-avec-mme-margarida-matos-rosa/
