= Kaplan Financial =

Kaplan Financial Ltd
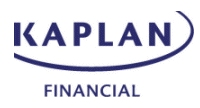
- Company type: Private
- Industry: Education
- Founded: 1958
- Headquarters: Ground Floor, Palace House, 3 Cathedral Street, London, SE1 9DE; England
- Key people: Peter Houillon, CEO
- Parent: Kaplan, Inc.
- Website: Kaplan Financial.co.uk

Kaplan Financial Ltd is a British company providing training in accountancy and financial services. It was founded in 1958. Kaplan Financial is part of Kaplan, Inc., a subsidiary of Graham Holdings Company. Kaplan Financial has more than 48,000 students a year, both in the UK and overseas. It offers courses in 28 training centres throughout the UK as well as home study and online learning.

Kaplan Financial prepares students for professional accountancy and tax exams including the AAT, ACA, ACCA, and CIMA, and investment qualifications such as CFA, CAIA, FRM, IAQ, IMC and SII. Kaplan Financial also offers a range of postgraduate courses including MBA, MA and MSc, as well as management and personnel qualifications.

== History ==
Kaplan Financial Ltd. Borough High Street Building London.

Kaplan Financial was formerly known as the Financial Training Company, then as FTC Kaplan after its acquisition in February 2003 by Kaplan, Inc., a global provider of education and training services. FTC also produced exam-focussed study materials, test prep and courses for the American Academy of Financial Management, AAT, ACCA and CIMA that were also used widely in other training institutions in the public and private sectors. These materials are now produced by Kaplan Publishing, another company in the Kaplan group.

=== Acquisitions ===
Major acquisitions in the last decade include:

- 2003—UK Accountancy Tuition Centres Ltd (ATC), provider of accountancy and professional training in the UK
- 2003—Emile Woolf Colleges Ltd., provider of CIMA and ACCA training
- 2003—AT Foulks Lynch Ltd., publisher of accountancy training materials for ACCA, CIMA, AAT and CAT syllabi
- 2003—Portman College of Management, a Newcastle-based professional school offering management training programmes
- 2008—Hawksmere Limited, a London-based training and conference provider
- 2009—West of England Language Services Limited (WELS), an international group of English language schools located in the United States, Australia, and the UK

=== Awards ===
In July 2009 Kaplan Financial was the first ACCA distance learning provider to be awarded Platinum status by the ACCA (Association of Chartered Certified Accountants). This is the highest status awarded to a tuition provider.

=== Knowledge Bank ===
In November 2012, Kaplan Financial launched the Kaplan Financial Knowledge Bank, a reference site providing free access to accountancy information.

=== Training Locations ===
As of 2018, Kaplan Financial has 23 training centres located up and down the UK as well as Distance Learning, Live Online, OnDemand products. These are:

- Birmingham
- Bristol
- Cambridge,
- Cardiff - ICAEW Courses only
- Crawley - ICAEW Courses only
- Glasgow
- Grimsby
- Hull
- Ipswich
- Isle of Man
- Leeds
- Leicester
- Liverpool
- London Borough High Street
- London Islington
- Manchester
- Milton Keynes
- Newcastle
- Norwich
- Nottingham
- Reading
- Sheffield
- Southampton
