= Fusion Technology Center =

Research building in Seoul, South Korea

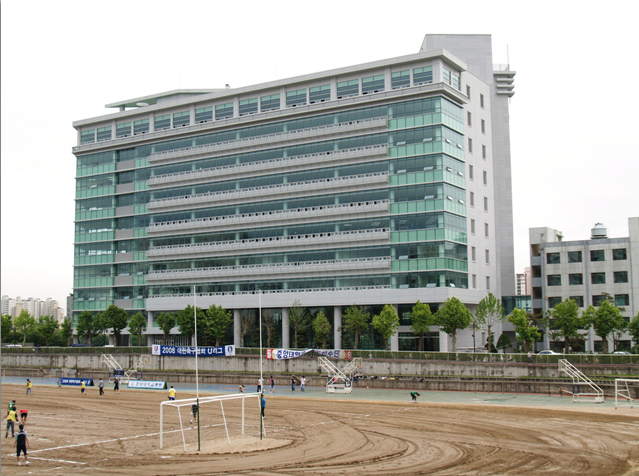
Fusion Technology Center

Fusion Technology Center (FTC; Korean: 퓨전테크놀로지센터) is a building for research on "fusion technologies" in South Korea. It was constructed under the sponsorship of the city of Seoul and Hanyang University. The headquarters of Asian Research Network is in this center. In January 2009, Taro Aso, the former Prime Minister of Japan visited this building to encourage researchers.

== Building ==
It was constructed for research institutes and education with 13 floors : B2~11F. The features of this building are focused on research. There are spaces for a research group office, seminar rooms, and experimental equipment. Also, this building is connected to the Annex of Engineering Center of Hanyang University with a sky bridge. A Clean room for special devices is located on 2F. The building is located in the Hanyang University Seoul campus, South Korea.

== Notable research institutes in FTC ==
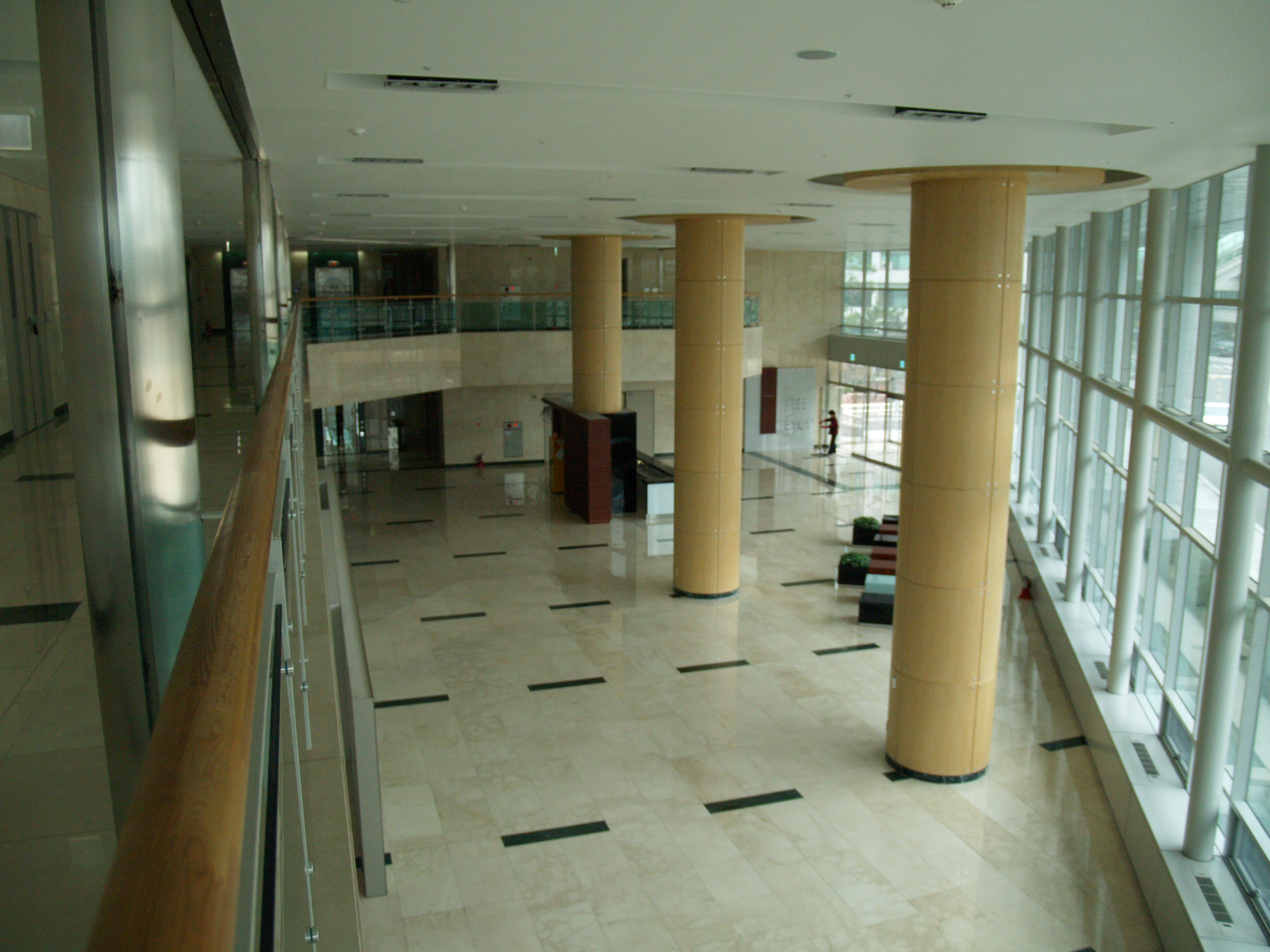
Inside of FTC

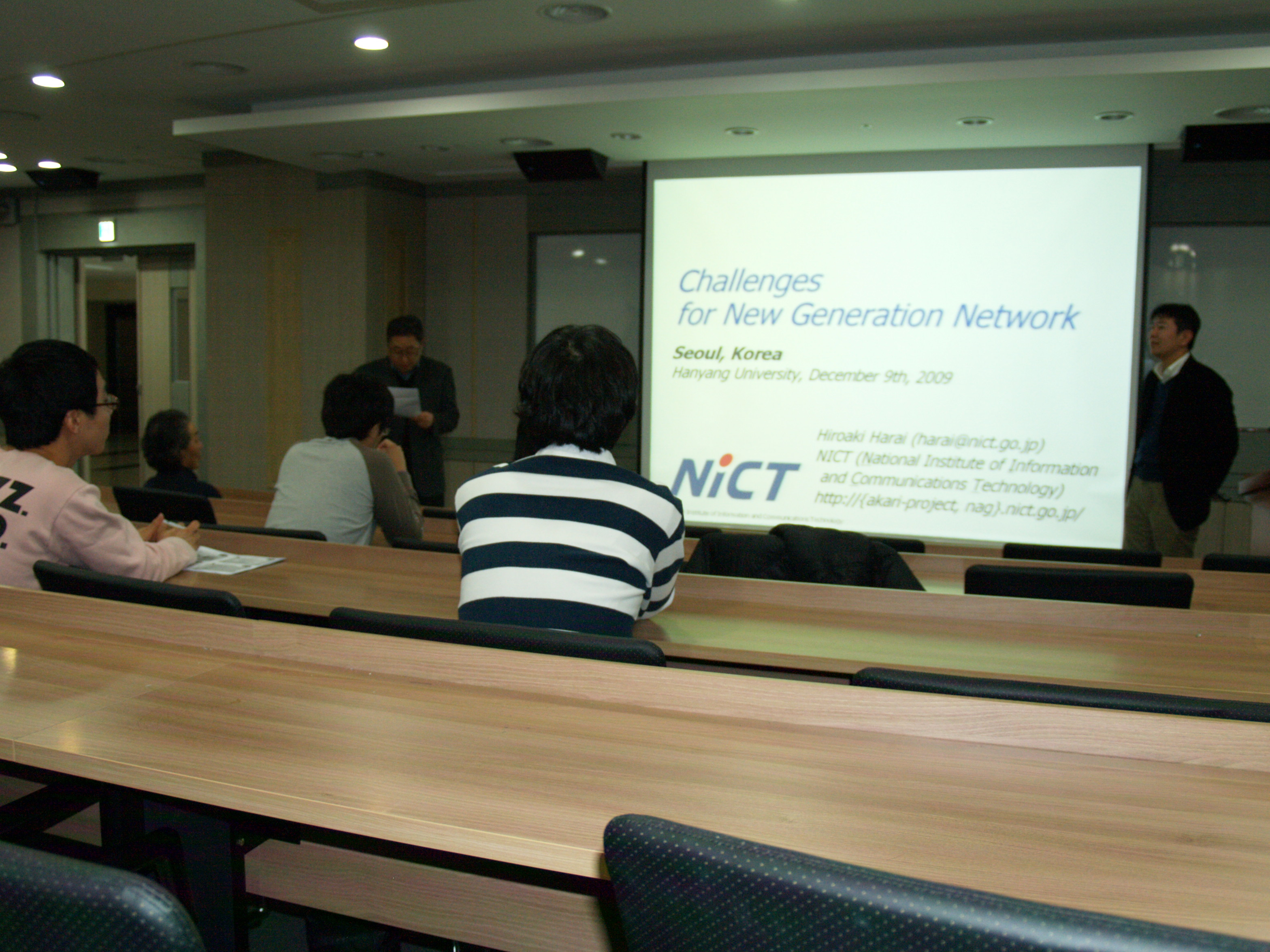
Seminar by a researcher from NICT in FTC room

- Asian Research Network
  - RIKEN
- Semiconductor research organization
  - Samsung Electronics
  - Hynix
- Specialized Research Lab of DAPA Korea (Defense Acquisition Program Administration)
- Institute of Nano Science & Technology(INST) – UT-Dallas/Texas Fusion Center

and there are many research institutes and laboratories.

=== Next generation Memory Education-Research-Industry Co-research Center ===
In 2009, this center was founded by Samsung Electronics and Hynix. Research field is STT-MRAM(Spin Transfer Torque – Magnetic Random Access Memory), one of the powerful candidate for next generation non-volatile memory. It has 300mm scale semiconductor manufacturing devices, which is the second constructed in worldwide university.

== See also ==
- Seoul
- Hanyang University
- Nanotechnology
- Biotechnology
