= International Competition Network =

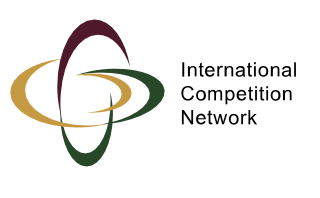
International Competition Network logo

The International Competition Network (ICN) provides competition authorities with a specialized yet informal venue for maintaining regular contacts and addressing practical competition concerns. It seeks to facilitate cooperation between competition law authorities globally. It was established in 2001 after the publication of a Final Report of the International Competition Policy Advisory Committee to the US Attorney General and Assistant Attorney General for Antitrust (or the ICPAC report, for short). Competition law experts in the US recommended that increased collaboration with overseas authorities could contribute to the coordination of enforcement and sharing of information on competition policy globally. It comprised 132 member states from 120 competition jurisdictions exclusively devoted to international competition enforcement. Its mission is to advance procedural and substantive convergence and facilitate cooperation.

The ICN member agencies produce work products based on consensus in project-oriented working groups. These groups are open to the participation of representatives from the business sector, consumer groups, academics, and the legal and economic professions as non-governmental advisers (NGAs). Members and NGAs convene at annual conferences, workshops and virtual events.

== History ==
The ICN was launched on October 25, 2001 by antitrust officials from 14 jurisdictions – Australia, Canada, the EU, France, Germany, Israel, Italy, Japan, Korea, Mexico, South Africa, the UK, the US, and Zambia. Recognizing the implications of increasing economic globalization, the concept of the ICN came from discussions and recommendations in particular in North America and Europe to facilitate meaningful international cooperation for competition law and policy.

== Membership ==
The members of the ICN represent national and multinational competition authorities.

In 2022, the ICN comprised more than 140 authorities from about 130 jurisdictions.

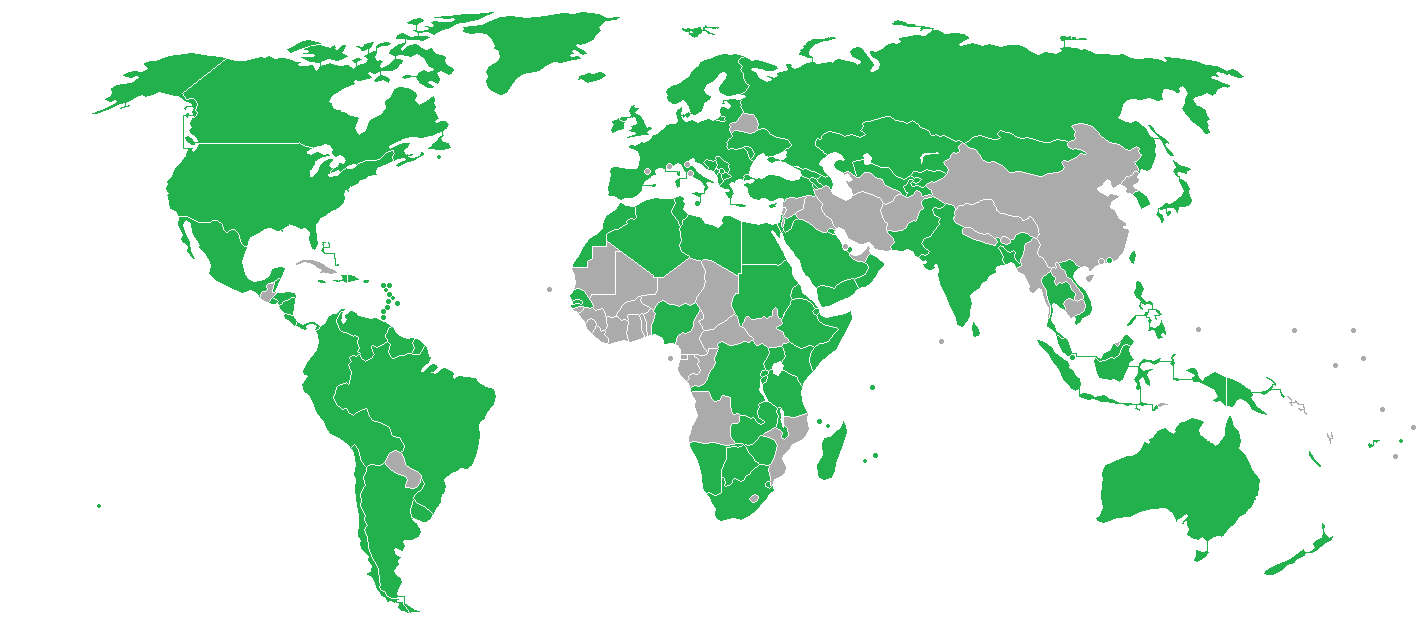
Countries with a competition law authority participating in the International Competition Network

== Leadership ==
The ICN is currently chaired by Andrea Marván, the third Mexican chair of a competition authority to lead the ICN. She succeeded Andreas Mundt of Germany. From 2023 to 2024, Lina Khan, the chairwoman of the U.S. Federal Trade Commission, was chosen to serve as the ICN's vice chair, succeeding to Margarida Matos Rosa, President of the Autoridade da Concorrência (Portugal). Matos Rosa was vice-chair of the ICN for Economic Growth and Recovery from 2022 to 2023.

=== Former chairs and vice-chairs ===
2002-2003: Konrad von Finckenstein (Competition Bureau, Canada)

2004: Fernando Sánchez Ugarte (Mexico)

2005-2006: Ulf Böge (BKA, Germany)

2007-2008: Sheridan Scott (Competition Bureau, Canada)

2009: David Lewis (Competition Commission, South Africa)

2010-2011: John Fingleton (Ofcom, UK)

2012: Eduardo Pérez Motta (COFECE, Mexico)

2013-2025: Andreas Mundt (Bundeskartellamt, Germany). Vice-chairs: Margarida Matos Rosa (Autoridade da Concorrência, 2022–23) and Lina Khan (FTC, 2023–24)

2025-today: Andrea Marván (COFECE, Mexico)

== Annual conference ==
Its first annual conference was held in Naples, Italy in September 2002, with representatives from 59 countries and NGAs. The second conference was in June 2003 in Merida, Mexico. During the conference, working groups review the work achieved in the year in different policy areas, such as mergers or anti-cartel enforcement. Other more recent annual conferences include: Singapore in 2016, Porto in 2017, New Delhi in 2018.
