= Competition Commission of Switzerland =

Swiss government agency

Competition Commission
- (in German) Wettbewerbskommission (in French) Commission de la concurrence (in Italian) Commissione della concorrenza

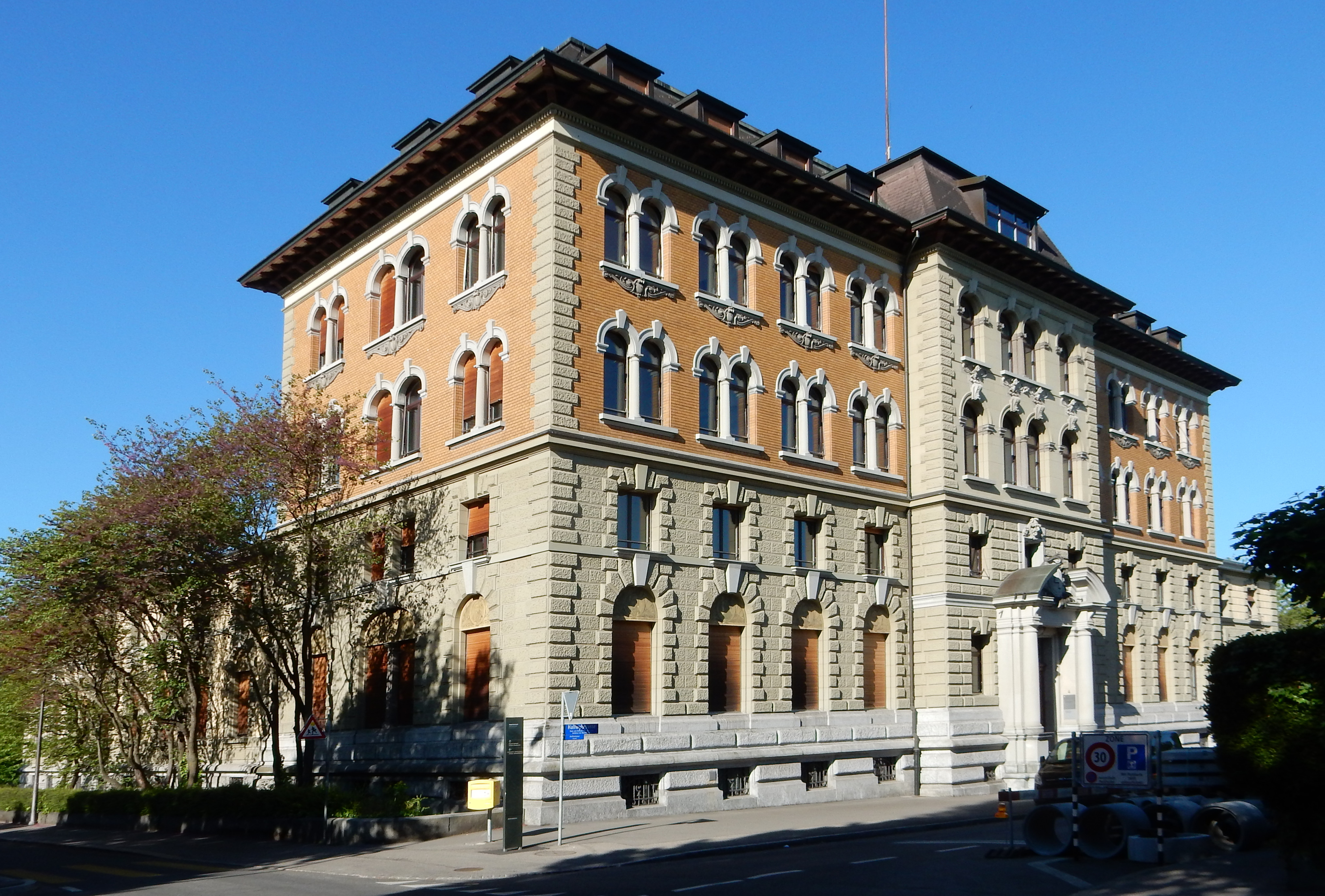
- Bern headquarters

Agency overview
- Formed: 1996
- Jurisdiction: Federal administration of Switzerland
- Headquarters: Bern
- Employees: 70
- Minister responsible: Guy Parmelin, Federal Councillor
- Parent agency: Federal Department of Economic Affairs, Education and Research
- Website: weko.admin.ch

The Competition Commission (COMCO) (Note: German: Wettbewerbskommission, WEKO, French: Commission de la concurrence, COMCO, Italian: Commissione della concorrenza, COMCO) is the Swiss competition regulator. Created in 1995, the commission is subordinated to the Federal Department of Economic Affairs, Education and Research but operates independently.

It is responsible for the enforcement of Swiss competition law (in particular cartel law). It is made up of twelve members (on a militia basis) and will employ around seventy people in 2023.

== Composition and organization ==
=== Members of the Commission ===
The members of COMCO are appointed by the Federal Council. It is composed of eleven to fifteen members. The Cartel Act stipulates that the majority of COMCO members must be independent experts. However, some members may be representatives of umbrella organizations.

The members hold a militia position, i.e. it is not a full-time post, but the members carry out another activity in parallel (e.g. university lecturer). Commission members must, however, declare their interests. The umbrella organisations represented on the Commission in 2023 were the Swiss Trade Union Federation, the Swiss Farmers' Union and Economiesuisse.

==== Independence ====
The commission is administratively attached to the Federal Department of Economic Affairs, Education and Research but carries out its activities independently, so that it is not bound by directives issued by the Federal Administration. This independence is important for the role of the COMCO because the State is often the subject of proceedings before the commission (as the owner, operator or regulator of a market, for example in the case of Swisscom, which is majority-owned by the Confederation). However, according to experts in this field quoted by the Tages-Anzeiger in 2018, political pressure can be felt when the COMCO tackles major dossiers that are considered sensitive.

In 2005, the OECD recommended that Switzerland guarantee effective independence for the COMCO; in particular, it criticised the presence of representatives of the main trade associations on its board.

== Full-time positions since 2001 ==
Raw data

"Federal Finance Administration FFA: State financial statements".
"Federal Finance Administration FFA: Data portal".
