= Comisión Federal de Competencia Económica =

Competition regulator of Mexican government

Mexican Federal Competition Commission
- Comisión Federal de Competencia Económica (Cofece)
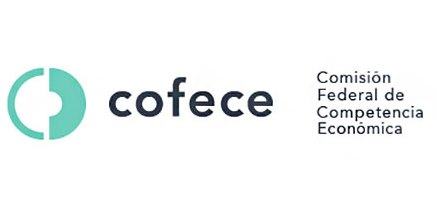

Commission overview
- Jurisdiction: Federal government of Mexico
- Headquarters: Av. Revolución 725, Col. Santa María Nonoalco, Alcaldía Benito Juárez, Ciudad de México, C. P. 03700,
- Commission executive: Andrea Marván Saltiel, Chair
- Website: Comisión Federal de Competencia Económica (Cofece) (in English)

The Federal Economic Competition Commission (Spanish: Comisión Federal de Competencia Económica, COFECE) is a Mexican government agency responsible for regulating anti-competitive behavior. The commission is a five-member body and is a constituent agency of the Secretariat of Economy.

== History ==
The commission was established in 1993. The agency was known as the Federal Competition Commission (Spanish: Comisión Federal de Competencia, CFC) prior to 2013. Under Article 28 of the Mexican Constitution, it is responsible for:

"...overseeing, promoting and guaranteeing competition and market access in Mexico for the efficient functioning of markets to the benefit of consumers and implementation of the Federal Economic Competition Law (LFCE)".

The mission of COFECE is to "protect the process of competition and free access to markets, through the prevention and elimination of monopolistic practices and other restrictions to market efficiency, in order to contribute to societal welfare."

=== Notable activities ===
In 2018, COFECE blocked Walmart from acquiring five stores from Soriana.

== Powers ==
Functions of COFECE include approval of mergers and acquisitions, investigating and penalizing monopolistic conduct, authorizing business activities in regulated sectors, and advocacy for competition in the marketplace. Article 28 of Mexico's constitution prohibits monopolies, but a more complete competition policy was set out in the LFCE (1993).

== Leadership ==
The commission is headed by five commissioners appointed by the President of Mexico, each of whom serves 10-year terms; one of the five members serves as president of the commission. Additionally, COFECE employs 175 other people, including 41 support staff. The current chair of the agency is commissioner Andrea Marván Saltiel, who was appointed in May 2023.
