= Bangladesh Competition Commission =

Government statutory body

- Formation: 17 December 2012
- Headquarters: Red Crescent Borak Tower (Level-4), 37/3/A, Old Elephant Road (Eskaton Garden), Ramna, haka-1000, Bangladesh.
- Region served: Whole Bangladesh
- Official language: Bengali
- Chairperson: A H M Ahsan
- Website: Bangladesh Competition Commission

Bangladesh Competition Commission (Bengali: বাংলাদেশ প্রতিযোগিতা কমিশন) is a Bangladesh government statutory body responsible for encouraging competition in the market. A H M Ahsan, Chairperson of Bangladesh Competition Commission.

== History ==
Bangladesh Competition Commission was established on 17 December 2012 as per provision of The Competition Act, 2012 in the Parliament of Bangladesh. The Act repealed and replaced the Monopolies and Restrictive Trade Practices Ordinance, 1970. The purpose of the commission is to prevent, control and eradicate collusion, monopoly and oligopoly, combination or abuse of dominant position or activities adverse to the competition. The commission consists of a chairperson and not more than 4 (four) members. Among them at least 3 persons will make a quorum. It is responsible for compliance of the Competition Act, 2012.
