= North Korea at the FIFA World Cup =

International football delegation

North Korea qualified and participated in the 1966 and 2010 FIFA World Cup.

In 1966, North Korea finished second in its group, after competing against the Soviet Union, Chile, and Italy. North Korea progressed to the second round, thus making them the first Asian country to have qualified past the first round. However, they lost to Portugal in the quarter-finals. Seven players were consistently fielded during these matches.

North Korea was the lowest-ranking team to qualify for the 2010 World Cup and did not pass the group stage after losing in all three group matches.

North Korea had four top goalscorers in 1966, and only one goalscorer in the 2010 World Cup.

Prior to North Korea's debut in 1966, the Korean Empire had entered qualification for the FIFA World Cup in 1930, 1934, and 1938 as part of Japan because Korea was occupied by Japan at that time. In later years, North Korea either withdrew (1970 and 1978), or did not enter or qualify for the World Cup.

== Summary ==
=== 1966 in England ===
After South Africa being disqualified and South Korea having withdrawn due to logistical reasons, North Korea had to compete in a play-off match against Australia in order to qualify, which they won 9–2 on aggregate.

In the third and decisive group match, North Korea beat title contenders Italy 1–0, eliminating them from the competition and advancing to the second stage. No team from Asia had ever progressed from the first round before, and the feat would not be repeated until 1994, when Saudi Arabia reached the Round of 16.

In the quarter-final against Portugal, North Korea managed to lead 3–0 after 25 minutes, but the game was turned around with a final score of 3–5, with Portuguese star player Eusébio scoring four goals.

=== 2010 in South Africa ===
With a final pre-tournament FIFA ranking of 105th in the world, North Korea was the lowest-ranked team to qualify for the World Cup since the rankings began in 1993.

2010 was North Korea's first appearance at the World Cup since 1966. The draw placed North Korea in Group G. They played their first match against five-time winners Brazil on 15 June. Despite their best efforts, they were outmatched and lost 1–2. In their next game against Portugal on 21 June, they were defeated 0–7. Despite starting well (as against Brazil), their defensive and well-organized approach unraveled after Portugal scored on them. The Koreans lost their final match against Ivory Coast 0–3 on 25 June. Having lost all three group matches, they were knocked out, finishing at the bottom of Group G. It was reported that the apparent North Korean football fans were actually Chinese people who bought tickets reserved for North Korean government officials. North Korea subsequently denied the report and claimed that the Chinese were small in number and that the government had permitted their travel.

== Record at the FIFA World Cup ==
Year	Round	Position	Pld	W	D	L	GF	GA
(Uruguay) 1930	Occupied by Japan							
(Italy) 1934	Occupied by Japan							
(France) 1938	Occupied by Japan							
(Brazil) 1950	Did not enter							
(Switzerland) 1954	Did not enter							
(Sweden) 1958	Did not enter							
(Chile) 1962	Did not enter							
(England) 1966	Quarter-finals	8th	4	1	1	2	5	9
(Mexico) 1970	Withdrew							
(West Germany) 1974	Did not qualify							
(Argentina) 1978	Withdrew							
(Spain) 1982	Did not qualify							
(Mexico) 1986	Did not qualify							
(Italy) 1990	Did not qualify							
(United States) 1994	Did not qualify							
(France) 1998	Did not enter							
(South Korea) (Japan) 2002	Did not enter							
(Germany) 2006	Did not qualify							
(South Africa) 2010	Group stage	32nd	3	0	0	3	1	12
(Brazil) 2014	Did not qualify							
(Russia) 2018	Did not qualify							
(Qatar) 2022	Withdrew							
(Canada) (Mexico) (United States) 2026	Did not qualify							
(Morocco) (Portugal) (Spain) 2030	To be determined							
(Saudi Arabia) 2034	To be determined							
Total	Quarter-finals	2/25	7	1	1	5	6	21

*Draws include knockout matches decided via penalty shoot-out

=== By match ===
World Cup	Round	Opponent	Score	Result	Venue	Scorers
1966	Group 4	Soviet Union	0–3	L	Middlesbrough	—
1966	Group 4	Chile	1–1	D	Middlesbrough	Pak S.Z.
1966	Group 4	Italy	1–0	W	Middlesbrough	Pak D.I.
1966	Quarter-finals	Portugal	3–5	L	Liverpool	Pak S.Z., Li D.W., Yang S.K.
2010	Group G	Brazil	1–2	L	Johannesburg	Ji Y.N.
2010	Group G	Portugal	0–7	L	Cape Town	—
2010	Group G	Ivory Coast	0–3	L	Nelspruit	—

== England 1966 ==
=== Group 4 ===
Team	Pld	W	D	L	GF	GA	GAv	Pts
Soviet Union	3	3	0	0	6	1	6.00	6
North Korea	3	1	1	1	2	4	0.50	3
Italy	3	1	0	2	2	2	1.00	2
Chile	3	0	1	2	2	5	0.40	1

12 July 1966
19:30 BST

Soviet Union	3–0	North Korea
Malofeyev 31', 88'; Banishevskiy 33'	Report

Ayresome Park, Middlesbrough
Attendance: 22,000
Referee: Juan Gardeazábal Garay (Spain)

15 July 1966
19:30 BST

Chile	1–1	North Korea
Marcos 26' (pen.)	Report	Pak Seung-zin 88'

Ayresome Park, Middlesbrough
Attendance: 16,000
Referee: Ali Kandil (United Arab Republic)

19 July 1966
19:30 BST

North Korea	1–0	Italy
Pak Doo-ik 42'	Report

Ayresome Park, Middlesbrough
Attendance: 18,000
Referee: Pierre Schwinte (France)

=== Quarter-finals ===
23 July 1966
15:00 BST

Portugal	5–3	North Korea
Eusébio 27', 43' (pen.), 56', 59' (pen.); José Augusto 80'	Report	Pak Seung-zin 1'; Li Dong-woon 22'; Yang Seung-kook 25'

Goodison Park, Liverpool
Attendance: 51,780
Referee: Menachem Ashkenazi (Israel)

== South Africa 2010 ==
=== Group G ===
Pos	Team	Pld	W	D	L	GF	GA	GD	Pts	Qualification
1	Brazil	3	2	1	0	5	2	+3	7	Advance to knockout stage
2	Portugal	3	1	2	0	7	0	+7	5	Advance to knockout stage
3	Ivory Coast	3	1	1	1	4	3	+1	4	
4	North Korea	3	0	0	3	1	12	−11	0	

Source: FIFA
Rules for classification: Tie-breaking criteria
15 June 2010
20:30

Brazil	2–1	North Korea
Maicon 55'; Elano 72'	Report	Ji Yun-nam 89'

Ellis Park Stadium, Johannesburg
Attendance: 54,331
Referee: Viktor Kassai (Hungary)

21 June 2010
13:30

Portugal	7–0	North Korea
Meireles 29'; Simão 53'; Almeida 56'; Tiago 60', 89'; Liédson 81'; Ronaldo 87'	Report

Cape Town Stadium, Cape Town
Attendance: 63,644
Referee: Pablo Pozo (Chile)

25 June 2010
16:00

North Korea	0–3	Ivory Coast
	Report	Y. Touré 14'; Romaric 20'; Kalou 82'

Mbombela Stadium, Nelspruit
Attendance: 34,763
Referee: Alberto Undiano Mallenco (Spain)

== Player records ==
=== Most appearances ===
Seven players were fielded in all four of North Korea's matches in 1966, making them record World Cup players for their country.

Rank	Player	Matches
1	Han Bong-Zin	4
1	Im Seung-Hwi	4
1	Li Chan-myung	4
1	Lim Zoong-Sun	4
1	Pak Doo-Ik	4
1	Pak Seung-Zin	4
1	Shin Yung-Kyoo	4

=== Goalscorers ===
On 16 July 1966, Pak Seung-zin made history by scoring North Korea's first-ever FIFA World Cup goal, coming in the 88th minute of their second match against Chile in Middlesbrough.

Rank	Player	Goals	World Cups
1	Pak Seung-Zin	2	1966
2	Pak Doo-Ik	1	1966
2	Lee Dong-Woon	1	1966
2	Yang Sung-Kook	1	1966
2	Ji Yun-Nam	1	2010

== See also ==
- Asian nations at the FIFA World Cup
- North Korea at the AFC Asian Cup

== Head-to-head record ==
Opponent	Pld	W	D	L	GF	GA	GD	Win %
Brazil	1	0	0	1	1	2	−1	0.00
Chile	1	0	1	0	1	1	+0	0.00
Italy	1	1	0	0	1	0	+1	100.00
Ivory Coast	1	0	0	1	0	3	−3	0.00
Portugal	2	0	0	2	3	12	−9	0.00
Soviet Union	1	0	0	1	0	3	−3	0.00
Total	7	1	1	5	6	21	−15	14.29
