= 1966 FIFA World Cup Group 4 =

Football tournament group stage

Group 4 of the 1966 FIFA World Cup consisted of Chile, Soviet Union, Italy, and North Korea. Play began on 12 July 1966 and concluded on 20 July 1966. Soviet Union won the group and North Korea finished as runners-up on their World Cup debut, and both advanced to the quarter-finals. Italy and Chile failed to advance.

== Standings ==
Pos	Team	Pld	W	D	L	GF	GA	GR	Pts	Qualification
1	Soviet Union	3	3	0	0	6	1	6.000	6	Advance to knockout stage
2	North Korea	3	1	1	1	2	4	0.500	3	Advance to knockout stage
3	Italy	3	1	0	2	2	2	1.000	2	
4	Chile	3	0	1	2	2	5	0.400	1	

Source: FIFA

== Matches ==
=== Soviet Union vs North Korea ===
12 July 1966
19:30 BST

Soviet Union	3–0	North Korea
Malofeyev 31', 88'; Banishevskiy 33'

Ayresome Park, Middlesbrough
Attendance: 23,006
Referee: Juan Gardeazábal Garay (Spain)

Soviet Union
North Korea

GK	21	Anzor Kavazashvili
RB	4	Vladimir Ponomaryov
CB	6	Albert Shesternyov (c)
CB	7	Murtaz Khurtsilava
LB	3	Leonīds Ostrovskis
RH	8	Yozhef Sabo
LH	14	Giorgi Sichinava
OR	11	Igor Chislenko
CF	18	Anatoliy Banishevskiy
CF	19	Eduard Malofeyev
OL	15	Galimzyan Khusainov	(yellow card) 77'
Manager:
Nikolai Morozov

GK	1	Li Chan-myung
RB	2	Pak Li-sup
CB	3	Shin Yung-kyoo
CB	5	Lim Zoong-sun
LB	4	Kang Bong-chil
RH	8	Pak Seung-zin (c)
CH	7	Pak Doo-ik
LH	6	Im Shung-hwi
RF	11	Han Bong-zin
CF	10	Kang Ryong-woon
LF	12	Kim Seung-il
Manager:
Myung Rye-hyun

=== Italy vs Chile ===
13 July 1966
19:30 BST

Italy	2–0	Chile
Mazzola 8'; Barison 88'

Roker Park, Sunderland
Attendance: 27,199
Referee: Gottfried Dienst (Switzerland)

Italy
Chile

GK	1	Enrico Albertosi
SW	22	Sandro Salvadore (c)
RB	5	Tarcisio Burgnich
CB	21	Roberto Rosato
LB	6	Giacinto Facchetti
CM	4	Giacomo Bulgarelli
CM	13	Giovanni Lodetti
AM	19	Gianni Rivera
OR	17	Marino Perani
CF	14	Sandro Mazzola
OL	3	Paolo Barison
Manager:
Edmondo Fabbri

GK	13	Juan Olivares
RB	6	Luis Eyzaguirre
CB	4	Humberto Cruz
CB	7	Elías Figueroa
LB	21	Hugo Villanueva
RH	12	Rubén Marcos
LH	14	Ignacio Prieto
OR	1	Pedro Araya Toro
CF	8	Alberto Fouilloux
CF	18	Armando Tobar
OL	17	Leonel Sánchez (c)
Manager:
Luis Álamos

=== Chile vs North Korea ===
15 July 1966
19:30 BST

Chile	1–1	North Korea
Marcos 26' (pen.)		Pak Seung-zin 88'

Ayresome Park, Middlesbrough
Attendance: 13,792
Referee: Ali Kandil (United Arab Republic)

Chile
North Korea

GK	13	Juan Olivares
RB	20	Aldo Valentini
CB	4	Humberto Cruz
CB	7	Elías Figueroa
LB	21	Hugo Villanueva
RH	12	Rubén Marcos	(yellow card) 17'
LH	14	Ignacio Prieto
OR	1	Pedro Araya Toro
CF	8	Alberto Fouilloux
CF	11	Honorino Landa
OL	17	Leonel Sánchez (c)
Manager:
Luis Álamos

GK	1	Li Chan-myung
RB	2	Pak Li-sup
CB	3	Shin Yung-kyoo
CB	5	Lim Zoong-sun
LB	13	Oh Yoon-kyung
RH	8	Pak Seung-zin (c)
CH	7	Pak Doo-ik
LH	6	Im Shung-hwi
RF	11	Han Bong-zin
CF	16	Li Dong-woon
LF	12	Kim Seung-il
Manager:
Myung Rye-hyun

=== Soviet Union vs Italy ===
16 July 1966
15:00 BST

Soviet Union	1–0	Italy
Chislenko 57'

Roker Park, Sunderland
Attendance: 27,793
Referee: Rudolf Kreitlein (West Germany)

Soviet Union
Italy

GK	1	Lev Yashin
RB	4	Vladimir Ponomaryov
CB	6	Albert Shesternyov (c)
CB	7	Murtaz Khurtsilava
LB	10	Vasiliy Danilov
RH	8	Yozhef Sabo	(yellow card) 77'
LH	12	Valery Voronin
OR	11	Igor Chislenko
CF	19	Eduard Malofeyev
CF	18	Anatoliy Banishevskiy
OL	15	Galimzyan Khusainov
Manager:
Nikolai Morozov

GK	1	Enrico Albertosi
SW	22	Sandro Salvadore (c)
RB	5	Tarcisio Burgnich
CB	21	Roberto Rosato
LB	6	Giacinto Facchetti
RH	13	Giovanni Lodetti
CH	4	Giacomo Bulgarelli
LH	12	Gianfranco Leoncini
OR	15	Gigi Meroni
CF	14	Sandro Mazzola
OL	16	Ezio Pascutti
Manager:
Edmondo Fabbri

=== North Korea vs Italy ===
19 July 1966
19:30 BST

North Korea	1–0	Italy
Pak Doo-ik 42'

Ayresome Park, Middlesbrough
Attendance: 17,829
Referee: Pierre Schwinte (France)

North Korea
Italy

GK	1	Li Chan-myung
RB	5	Lim Zoong-sun
CB	3	Shin Yung-kyoo
CB	14	Ha Jung-won
LB	13	Oh Yoon-kyung
RH	8	Pak Seung-zin (c)
CH	7	Pak Doo-ik
LH	6	Im Shung-hwi
RF	11	Han Bong-zin
CF	17	Kim Bong-hwan
LF	15	Yang Song-guk
Manager:
Myung Rye-hyun

GK	1	Enrico Albertosi
SW	9	Francesco Janich
RB	11	Spartaco Landini
CB	8	Aristide Guarneri
LB	6	Giacinto Facchetti
RH	4	Giacomo Bulgarelli (c)
LH	7	Romano Fogli
OR	17	Marino Perani
CF	14	Sandro Mazzola
CF	3	Paolo Barison
OL	19	Gianni Rivera
Manager:
Edmondo Fabbri

=== Soviet Union vs Chile ===
20 July 1966
19:30 BST

Soviet Union	2–1	Chile
Porkuyan 28', 85'		Marcos 32'

Roker Park, Sunderland
Attendance: 16,027
Referee: John Adair (Northern Ireland)

Soviet Union
Chile

GK	21	Anzor Kavazashvili
RB	9	Viktor Getmanov
CB	6	Albert Shesternyov (c)
CB	13	Alexey Korneyev
LB	3	Leonīds Ostrovskis
RH	12	Valery Voronin
LH	5	Valentin Afonin
OR	16	Slava Metreveli
CF	2	Viktor Serebryanikov
CF	20	Eduard Markarov
OL	17	Valeriy Porkujan
Manager:
Nikolai Morozov

GK	13	Juan Olivares
RB	20	Aldo Valentini
CB	4	Humberto Cruz
CB	7	Elías Figueroa
LB	21	Hugo Villanueva
RH	12	Rubén Marcos
LH	14	Ignacio Prieto
OR	1	Pedro Araya Toro
CF	11	Honorino Landa
CF	22	Guillermo Yávar
OL	17	Leonel Sánchez (c)
Manager:
Luis Álamos

== See also ==
- Chile at the FIFA World Cup
- Italy at the FIFA World Cup
- North Korea at the FIFA World Cup
- Soviet Union at the FIFA World Cup
