= North Korea national football team results (1956–1979) =

This article provides details of international football games played by the North Korea national football team from 1956 to 1979.

== International matches ==
=== 1956 ===
7 October 1956 Friendship Tournament	China	0–1	North Korea	Beijing, China
		Report		Stadium: Xiannongtan Stadium

10 October 1956 Friendship Tournament	North Korea	3–0	North Vietnam	Beijing, China
		Report		Stadium: Xiannongtan Stadium

=== 1958 ===
September Friendly	Mongolia	0–1	North Korea	Ulaanbaatar, Mongolia
		Report		Stadium: National Sports Stadium

=== 1959 ===
22 October 1959 Friendship Tournament	North Korea	5–0	North Vietnam	Pyongyang, North Korea
		Report

25 October 1959 Friendship Tournament	North Korea	1–0	China	Pyongyang, North Korea
		Report

=== 1960 ===
4 December 1960 Friendship Tournament	China	1–0	North Korea	Hanoi, Vietnam
	Sun Yuanyun	Report		Stadium: Hàng Đẫy Stadium

8 December 1960 Friendship Tournament	North Vietnam	1–3	North Korea	Hanoi, Vietnam
		Report		Stadium: Hàng Đẫy Stadium

10 December 1960 Friendship Tournament	North Korea	10–1	Mongolia	Hanoi, Vietnam
		Report		Stadium: Hàng Đẫy Stadium

=== 1963 ===
14 November 1963 GANEFO Tournament	North Korea	14–0	Somalia	Jakarta, Indonesia
		Report		Stadium: Gelora Senayan Main Stadium

18 November 1963 GANEFO Tournament	Indonesia	1–5	North Korea	Jakarta, Indonesia
		Report		Stadium: Gelora Senayan Main Stadium

20 November 1963 GANEFO Tournament	North Korea	2–0	North Vietnam	Jakarta, Indonesia
		Report		Stadium: Gelora Senayan Main Stadium

22 November 1963 GANEFO Tournament final	United Arab Republic	1–1 (Note: The United Arab Republic won the game on a coin toss) (a.e.t.)	North Korea	Jakarta, Indonesia
		Report		Stadium: Gelora Senayan Main Stadium

=== 1964 ===
22 March 1964 Summer Olympics qualification	Burma	0–0	North Korea	Rangoon, Burma
		Report		Stadium: Bogyoke Aung San Stadium

2 April 1964 Summer Olympics qualification	North Korea	1–0 (1–0 agg.)	Burma	Pyongyang, North Korea
	Pak Seung-zin (?)	Report		Stadium: Girimri Stadium

31 May 1964 Summer Olympics qualification	North Korea	2–0	Thailand	Rangoon, Burma
	Pak Seung-zin 58'; Kong Si-hak 71'	Report		Stadium: Bogyoke Aung San Stadium

28 June 1964 Summer Olympics qualification	Thailand	0–5 (0–7 agg.)	North Korea	Rangoon, Burma
		Report	Kim Seung-il 21'; Pak Doo-ik 24', 71', 76'; Pak Seung-zin 67'	Stadium: Bogyoke Aung San Stadium

11 October 1964 Summer Olympics	North Korea	Cancelled (Note: North Korea withdrew from the entire Games before the Opening Ceremony after Japanese immigration officials refused six of their athletes entry.)	Yugoslavia	Japan

13 October 1964 Summer Olympics	Hungary	Cancelled	North Korea	Japan

15 October 1964 Summer Olympics	Morocco	Cancelled	North Korea	Japan

=== 1965 ===
2 August 1965 GANEFO Tournament	North Korea	1–0	North Vietnam	Pyongyang, North Korea
		Report		Stadium: Moranbong Stadium

4 August 1965 GANEFO Tournament	North Korea	3–0	China	Pyongyang, North Korea
		Report		Stadium: Moranbong Stadium

6 August 1965 GANEFO Tournament	North Korea	3–0	Guinea	Pyongyang, North Korea
		Report		Stadium: Moranbong Stadium

8 August 1965 GANEFO Tournament	North Korea	3–0	Indonesia	Pyongyang, North Korea
		Report		Stadium: Moranbong Stadium

9 August 1965 GANEFO Tournament	North Korea	4–0	Cambodia	Pyongyang, North Korea
		Report		Stadium: Moranbong Stadium

21 November 1966 FIFA World Cup qualification	North Korea	6–1	Australia	Phnom Penh, Cambodia
	Pak Doo-ik 15'; Pak Seung-zin 54', 80'; Im Shung-hwi 58'; Han Bong-zin 65', 88'	Report	Scheinflug 70' (pen.)	Stadium: Phnom Penh Olympic Stadium; Attendance: 60,000; Referee: Patrick Nice (Malaysia)

24 November 1966 FIFA World Cup qualification	Australia	1–3 (2–9 agg.)	North Korea	Phnom Penh, Cambodia
	Scheinflug 15'	Report	Kim Seung-il 18', 75'; Pak Seung-zin 53'	Stadium: Phnom Penh Olympic Stadium; Attendance: 40,000; Referee: A.G. de Silva (Singapore)

30 November Friendly	Cambodia	0–3	North Korea	Phnom Penh, Cambodia
		Report		Stadium: Phnom Penh Olympic Stadium

=== 1966 ===
12 July 1966 FIFA World Cup	Soviet Union	3–0	North Korea	Middlesbrough, England
	Malofeyev 31', 88'; Banishevskiy 33'	Report		Stadium: Ayresome Park; Attendance: 23,006; Referee: Juan Gardeazábal Garay (Spain)

15 July 1966 FIFA World Cup	Chile	1–1	North Korea	Middlesbrough, England
	Marcos 26' (pen.)	Report	Pak Seung-zin 88'	Stadium: Ayresome Park; Attendance: 13,792; Referee: Ali Kandil (United Arab Republic)

19 July 1966 FIFA World Cup	North Korea	1–0	Italy	Middlesbrough, England
	Pak Doo-ik 42'	Report		Stadium: Ayresome Park; Attendance: 17,829; Referee: Pierre Schwinte (Italy)

23 July 1966 FIFA World Cup	Portugal	5–3	North Korea	Liverpool, England
	Eusébio 27', 43' (pen.), 56', 59' (pen.); José Augusto 80'	Report	Pak Seung-zin 1'; Li Dong-woon 22'; Yang Seung-kook 25'	Stadium: Goodison Park; Attendance: 17,829; Referee: Menachem Ashkenazi (Israel)

26 November 1966 GANEFO Tournament	Cambodia	0–2	North Korea	Phnom Penh, Cambodia
		Report		Stadium: Olympic Stadium

29 November 1966 GANEFO Tournament	North Korea	5–1	Palestine	Phnom Penh, Cambodia
		Report		Stadium: Olympic Stadium

30 November 1966 GANEFO Tournament	North Korea	14–0	North Yemen	Phnom Penh, Cambodia
		Report		Stadium: Olympic Stadium

3 December 1966 GANEFO Tournament	North Korea	2–1	China	Phnom Penh, Cambodia
		Report	Liu Qingquan	Stadium: Olympic Stadium

6 December 1966 GANEFO Tournament	North Korea	3–1	North Vietnam	Phnom Penh, Cambodia
		Report		Stadium: Olympic Stadium

=== 1969 ===
5 December Friendly	Algeria	1–3	North Korea	Algiers, Algeria
		Report

22 December Friendly	Iraq	1–0	North Korea	Baghdad, Iraq
		Report

=== 1970 ===
18 January Friendly	Cuba	0–0	North Korea	Havana, Cuba
		Report

8 February Friendly	Cuba	1–0	North Korea	Havana, Cuba
		Report

=== 1971 ===
6 May Friendly	North Korea	0–0	Cuba	Pyongyang, North Korea

28 May 1972 Summer Olympics qualification	Syria	0–0	North Korea	Damascus, Syria
		Report

1 June 1972 Summer Olympics qualification	North Korea	1–0 (1–0 agg.)	Syria	Pyongyang, North Korea
	Kim 30'	Report

12 November 1972 Summer Olympics qualification	Iraq	1–0	North Korea	Baghdad, Iraq
	Hatim 12'	Report		Stadium: Al-Shaab Stadium

28 November 1972 Summer Olympics qualification	North Korea	3–0 (3–1 agg.)	Iraq	Pyongyang, North Korea
	20'; 43'; 58'	Report

=== 1972 ===
3 May 1972 Summer Olympics qualification	North Korea	0–0	Iran	Pyongyang, North Korea
		Report

26 May 1972 Summer Olympics qualification	Iran	0–0	North Korea	Tehran, Iran
		Report		Stadium: Amjadieh Stadium

3 June 1972 Summer Olympics qualification	Iran	2–0 (2–0 agg.)	North Korea	Rawalpindi, Pakistan
	Iranpak 27'; Kalani 47'	Report		Stadium: Army Stadium

=== 1973 ===
4 May 1974 FIFA World Cup qualification	Iran	0–0	North Korea	Tehran, Iran
		Report		Stadium: Aryamehr Stadium; Attendance: 63,366; Referee: M. Ramalingam (Malaysia)

6 May 1974 FIFA World Cup qualification	North Korea	1–1	Syria	Tehran, Iran
	Kim Jong-min 53'	Report	Chahrestan 71'	Stadium: Amjadieh Stadium; Attendance: 11,940; Referee: Vijit Getkaew (Thailand)

8 May 1974 FIFA World Cup qualification	North Korea	0–0	Kuwait	Tehran, Iran
		Report		Stadium: Aryamehr Stadium; Attendance: 22,362; Referee: Alex Vaz (India)

11 May 1974 FIFA World Cup qualification	Iran	2–1	North Korea	Tehran, Iran
	Monajati 19'; Sadeghi 89'	Report	Pak Seung-zin 48'	Stadium: Aryamehr Stadium; Attendance: 53,829; Referee: Ong Eng Young (Singapore)

13 May 1974 FIFA World Cup qualification	North Korea	3–1	Syria	Tehran, Iran
	An Se-uk 30'; Ma Jong-u 39', 77'	Report		Stadium: Aryamehr Stadium; Attendance: 11,940; Referee: Alex Vaz (India)

15 May 1974 FIFA World Cup qualification	Kuwait	2–0	North Korea	Tehran, Iran
	Bo Hamad 31', 51'	Report		Stadium: Aryamehr Stadium; Attendance: 6,028; Referee: Vijit Getkaew (Thailand)

25 July Friendly	Norway	3–0	North Korea	Bergen, Norway
	Johansen; Kvia; Vold	Report		Stadium: Brann Stadion; Referee: Kurt Ohlsen (Denmark)

=== 1974 ===
25 May Friendly	Bulgaria	6–1	North Korea	Sofia, Bulgaria
	Borisov; Bonev; Panov; Mihaylov	Report	Kim Shen-min	Stadium: Stadion Georgi Asparuhov; Attendance: 20,000

2 September 1974 Asian Games	North Korea	2–0	China	Tehran, Iran
	An Se-uk 34'; An Gil-wan 61'	Report		Stadium: Aryamehr Stadium; Attendance: 5,000; Referee: Jafar Namdar (Iran)

4 September 1974 Asian Games	North Korea	0–1	Iraq	Tehran, Iran
		Report	Jassam 73'	Stadium: Amjadieh Stadium; Referee: U Tin Htut (Burma)

6 September 1974 Asian Games	India	1–4	North Korea	Tehran, Iran
	Rajvi	Report	Hong Song-nam; Yang Song-guk; Myong Dong-chan	Stadium: Amjadieh Stadium

10 September 1974 Asian Games	Kuwait	0–2	North Korea	Tehran, Iran
		Report	Cha Jung-sok 11'; Pak Jong-hun 46'	Stadium: Aryamehr Stadium

12 September 1974 Asian Games	Israel	2–0; Awarded (Note: Israel were awarded a 2–0 win after North Korea refused to play)	North Korea	Tehran, Iran
		Report		Stadium: Aryamehr Stadium

14 September 1974 Asian Games	North Korea	2–2	Burma	Tehran, Iran
	Yang Song-guk 41'; Kim Jong-min 42'	Report	Maung Maung Tin 20' (pen.); Tin Aung 68'	Stadium: Aryamehr Stadium; Referee: Reza Heidari (Iran)

15 September 1974 Asian Games	North Korea	1–2	Malaysia	Tehran, Iran
	Kim Jong-min 58'	Report	Isa 48', 81'	Stadium: Aryamehr Stadium; Referee: U Tin Htut (Burma)

=== 1975 ===
15 June 1976 AFC Asian Cup qualification	China	1–0	North Korea	Causeway Bay, Hong Kong
	Li Guoning	Report		Stadium: Government Stadium

17 June 1976 AFC Asian Cup qualification	North Korea	1–0	Japan	Causeway Bay, Hong Kong
	An Se-wook 65' (pen.)	Report		Stadium: Government Stadium; Attendance: 30,000

19 June 1976 AFC Asian Cup qualification	North Korea	1–0	Singapore	Causeway Bay, Hong Kong
	Kim Bok-nam 52'	Report		Stadium: Government Stadium; Attendance: 12,000

24 June 1976 AFC Asian Cup qualification	North Korea	3–3 (11–10 p)	Hong Kong	Causeway Bay, Hong Kong
		Report		Stadium: Government Stadium

26 June 1976 AFC Asian Cup qualification	North Korea	2–0	China	Causeway Bay, Hong Kong
	Hong Song-nam 8'; Myong Dong-chan 28'	Report		Stadium: Government Stadium; Attendance: 28,566

=== 1976 ===
18 February (Note: The RSSSF states that the 1976 Summer Olympics qualification games played in 1976 were in June. However, the Elo list them as taking place in February) 1976 Summer Olympics qualification	North Korea	2–0	Malaysia	Jakarta, Indonesia
		Report

20 February 1976 Summer Olympics qualification	Indonesia	1–2	North Korea	Jakarta, Indonesia
		Report

22 February 1976 Summer Olympics qualification	North Korea	4–0	Papua New Guinea	Jakarta, Indonesia
		Report

24 February 1976 Summer Olympics qualification	North Korea	2–0	Singapore	Jakarta, Indonesia
		Report

26 February 1976 Summer Olympics qualification	North Korea	0–0 (5–4 p)	Indonesia	Jakarta, Indonesia
		Report

5 May Friendly	Bulgaria	3–0	North Korea	Sofia, Bulgaria
	Bonev (pen.); Zhelyazkov	Report		Stadium: Stadion Georgi Asparuhov; Attendance: 8,000

9 May Friendly	North Korea	5–0	Malaysia	Pyongyang, North Korea
		Report

21 July 1976 Summer Olympics	North Korea	3–1	Canada	Toronto, Canada
	An Se-uk 18'; Hong Song-nam 66', 80'	Report	Douglas 51'	Stadium: Varsity Stadium; Attendance: 12,638; Referee: Marco Antonio Dorantes García (Mexico)

23 July 1976 Summer Olympics	Soviet Union	3–0	North Korea	Ottawa, Canada
	Kolotov 16' (pen.); Veremeyev 81'; Blokhin 89'	Report		Stadium: Lansdowne Park; Attendance: 15,233; Referee: Emilio Guruceta-Muro (Spain)

25 July 1976 Summer Olympics	Poland	5–0	North Korea	Montreal, Canada
	Szarmach 13', 49'; Lato 59', 79'; Szymanowski 64'	Report		Stadium: Olympic Stadium; Attendance: 46,885; Referee: Paul Schiller (Austria)

=== 1978 ===
27 February Friendly	Iraq	1–0	North Korea	Baghdad, Iraq
		Report

13 December 1978 Asian Games	Burma	0–3	North Korea	Bangkok, Thailand
		Report

15 December 1978 Asian Games	North Korea	3–0	Thailand	Bangkok, Thailand
		Report

17 December 1978 Asian Games	Iraq	0–3	North Korea	Bangkok, Thailand
		Report

18 December 1978 Asian Games	India	1–3	North Korea	Bangkok, Thailand
		Report

19 December 1978 Asian Games	North Korea	2–2	Kuwait	Bangkok, Thailand
		Report

20 December 1978 Asian Games final	North Korea	0–0 (Note: With the game finishing in a draw, the gold medal was shared between both Korea sides) (a.e.t.)	South Korea	Bangkok, Thailand
		Report

=== 1979 ===
12 March Friendly	Kuwait	3–0	North Korea	Kuwait City, Kuwait

15 March Friendly	Kuwait	0–2	North Korea	Kuwait City, Kuwait

18 March Friendly	Kuwait	1–2	North Korea	Kuwait City, Kuwait

2 May 1980 AFC Asian Cup qualification	North Korea	3–0	Hong Kong	Bangkok, Thailand
		Report

7 May 1980 AFC Asian Cup qualification	North Korea	3–1	Indonesia	Bangkok, Thailand
	Pak Jong-hun 22', 75'; Hong Song-nam 32'	Report	Lala 35'

9 May 1980 AFC Asian Cup qualification	Malaysia	1–1	North Korea	Bangkok, Thailand
		Report

12 May 1980 AFC Asian Cup qualification	Thailand	0–1	North Korea	Bangkok, Thailand
		Report

14 May 1980 AFC Asian Cup qualification	North Korea	1–0	Malaysia	Bangkok, Thailand
		Report

23 August Friendly	North Korea	0–0	Japan	Pyongyang, North Korea
		Report
