= Oh Yoon-kyung =

North Korean footballer

Personal information
- Date of birth: 6 August 1941
- Place of birth: Korea, Empire of Japan
- Date of death: before 2002
- Height: 1.72 m (5 ft 8 in)
- Positions: Defender; midfielder

Senior career*
Years	Team	Apps	(Gls)
- 8 August

International career
c. 1962–after 1966	North Korea	58+	
- * Club domestic league appearances and goals

- Oh Yoon-kyung
- Hangul: 오윤경
- RR: O Yungyeong
- MR: O Yun'gyŏng

Oh Yoon-kyung (Korean: 오윤경; 6 August 1941 – before 2002) was a North Korean football defender and midfielder who played for the national team in the 1966 FIFA World Cup. He made at least 58 appearances for the national team and was given the title of People's Athlete following the World Cup. He also played for 8 August Sports Club in North Korea.

== Early life ==
Oh was born on 6 August 1941 in Korea, Empire of Japan, in what became North Korea. In the domestic ranks, he played for the 8 August Sports Club in North Korea's top league. During his playing career, his height was 172 cm (5 ft 8 in).

== International career ==
In 1957, the North Korea national football team was re-organized with the goal of competing at the 1966 FIFA World Cup. In c. 1962, Oh was chosen as one of the best 40 players from the North Korean leagues, whose membership reportedly consisted of over 250,000, to be considered for the national team. The 40 players were enlisted into the Army as military officers, under the leadership of colonel and coach Myung Rye-hyun, and went under strict training for the next four years in preparation for the cup. Oh and the others trained twice a day starting at 6:00 a.m. and were under other restrictions which included being unmarried, no smoking, no drinking, and (for the last six months) being in bed by 10:00 p.m.

In early 1965, the North Korean leagues were suspended to allow the roster to focus solely on the task of making the World Cup. Oh and the rest of the players gained experience by playing a number of international matches against nations including North Vietnam, Indonesia, Laos, Cambodia and China. The team competed at that year's Games of Emerging New Forces (GANEFO) and went undefeated, with a 3–1 win over China in the finals. Later in 1965, they played at the 1966 FIFA World Cup qualification and defeated Australia to become the sole qualifier from the African, Asian and Oceanic zone.

Oh, a midfielder and defender, was ultimately chosen as one of 22 players for the World Cup team. By that time, he had been capped for the national team a total of 55 times, according to the Evening Telegraph, although the Sunday Mirror reported it to be 102 caps. At the World Cup, the North Korean team played their home games at Ayresome Park in Middlesbrough, England, as part of Group 4 in the tournament which included the Soviet Union, Chile and Italy. Projected as having little chance of success, the team lost their first match, 3–0 against the Soviet Union, before tying Chile 1–1. Oh was inactive for the first game against the Soviet Union but started against Chile and played all 90 minutes. The team then played against heavily-favored Italy to determine the qualifier to the next round. The Guardian noted that despite how heavily favored Italy was, "Shin Yung Kyoo, Ha Jung Won and Oh Yoon Kyung were the equals of Mazzola, Perani and Barison." In a massive upset, North Korea won 1–0 on a goal by Pak Doo-ik. They eventually lost 5–3 in the quarterfinals to Portugal. Oh appeared in the last three games of the tournament for North Korea, starting each while playing all 270 minutes in those games.

== Later life ==
For the team's performance at the World Cup, all the players were given the honor of Merited Athlete. Oh, however, was one of three – along with Pak Do-ik and Shin Yung-kyoo – to be given the honor of People's Athlete, the most prestigious title awarded to North Korean athletes. After the World Cup, it was rumored that the North Korean squad was imprisoned for celebrating the win over Italy in a bar; however, when interviewed in 2002, several players denied this.

In 2002, the surviving members of the 1966 North Korean World Cup team were interviewed for the documentary film The Game of Their Lives; Oh was deceased by this time.
