= Pak Li-sup =

North Korean footballer

Personal information
- Date of birth: 6 January 1944
- Place of birth: Korea, Empire of Japan
- Date of death: before 2002
- Position: Defender

Senior career*
Years	Team	Apps	(Gls)
- Amrokgang Sports Club

International career
c. 1962–after 1966	North Korea	9+	
- * Club domestic league appearances and goals

Pak Li-sup (6 January 1944 – before 2002) was a North Korean football defender who played for the national team in the 1966 FIFA World Cup. He also played for Amrokgang Sports Club.

== Early life ==
Pak was born on 6 January 1944 in Korea, Empire of Japan, in what became North Korea. A defender, he played football at the club level for Amnokgang Sports Club in the DPR Korea Premier Football League, North Korea's top football league.

== International career ==
In 1957, the North Korea national football team was re-organized with the goal of competing at the 1966 FIFA World Cup. In c. 1962, Pak was chosen as one of the best 40 players from the North Korean leagues, whose membership reportedly consisted of over 250,000, to be considered for the national team. The 40 players were enlisted into the Army as military officers, under the leadership of colonel and coach Myung Rye-hyun, and went under strict training for the next four years in preparation for the cup. Pak and the others trained twice a day starting at 6:00 a.m. and were under other restrictions which included being unmarried, no smoking, no drinking, and (for the last six months) being in bed by 10:00 p.m.

In early 1965, the North Korean leagues were suspended to allow the roster to focus solely on the task of making the World Cup. Pak and the rest of the players gained experience by playing a number of international matches against nations including North Vietnam, Indonesia, Laos, Cambodia and China. The team competed at that year's Games of Emerging New Forces (GANEFO) and went undefeated, with a 3–1 win over China in the finals. Later in 1965, they played at the 1966 FIFA World Cup qualification and defeated Australia to become the sole qualifier from the African, Asian and Oceanic zone.

Pak was ultimately chosen as one of 22 players for the World Cup team. By the time of the World Cup, he had appeared for the national team at least 10 times, according to the Evening Telegraph, although the Sunday Mirror reported the number to be seven caps. At the World Cup, the North Korean team played their home games at Ayresome Park in Middlesbrough, England, as part of the Group 4 in the tournament which included the Soviet Union, Chile and Italy. Projected as having little chance of success, the team lost their first match, 3–0 against the Soviet Union, before tying Chile 1–1. Pak appeared in the first two games and played all 180 minutes, then was inactive for the subsequent matches. The team then played against heavily-favored Italy to determine the qualifier to the next round. In a massive upset, North Korea won 1–0 on a goal by Pak Doo-ik. The team eventually lost 5–3 in the quarterfinals to Portugal. Pak ended the World Cup with two appearances, playing 180 minutes.

== Later life ==
For the team's performance at the World Cup, all the players who appeared in a match were given the title of Merited Athlete, the second-highest honor for sportspeople in North Korea. After the World Cup, it was rumored that the North Korean squad was imprisoned for celebrating the win over Italy in a bar; however, when interviewed in 2002, several players denied this. In 2002, the surviving members of the 1966 North Korean World Cup team were interviewed for the documentary film The Game of Their Lives; Pak was deceased by this time.
