= Kang Ryong-woon =

20th-century North Korean footballer

Personal information
- Date of birth: 25 April 1942
- Place of birth: Korea
- Date of death: before 2002
- Position: Forward

Senior career*
Years	Team	Apps	(Gls)
- Rodongja Sports Club

International career
c. 1962–after 1966	North Korea	39+	
- * Club domestic league appearances and goals

- Kang Ryong-woon
- Hangul: 강룡운
- RR: Gang Ryongun
- MR: Kang Ryongun

Kang Ryong-woon (25 April 1942 – before 2002) was a North Korean football forward who played for national team in the 1966 FIFA World Cup. He also played for Rodongja Sports Club.

== Early life ==
Kang was born on 25 April 1942 in what became North Korea. A forward, he played at the club level for Rodongja Sports Club in North Korea's top league. During his playing career, he had a reported height of 167 centimetres (66 in).

== International career ==
In 1957, the North Korea national football team was re-organized with the goal of competing at the 1966 FIFA World Cup. In c. 1962, Kang was chosen as one of the best 40 players from the North Korean leagues, whose membership reportedly consisted of over 250,000, to be considered for the national team. The 40 players were enlisted into the Army as military officers, under the leadership of colonel and coach Myung Rye-hyun, and went under strict training for the next four years in preparation for the cup. Kang and the others trained twice a day starting at 6:00 a.m. and were under other restrictions which included being unmarried, no smoking, no drinking, and (for the last six months) being in bed by 10:00 p.m.

In early 1965, the North Korean leagues were suspended to allow the roster to focus solely on the task of making the World Cup. Kang and the rest of the players gained experience by playing a number of international matches against nations including North Vietnam, Indonesia, Laos, Cambodia and China. The team competed at that year's Games of Emerging New Forces (GANEFO) and went undefeated, with a 3–1 win over China in the finals. Later in 1965, they played at the 1966 FIFA World Cup qualification and defeated Australia to become the sole qualifier from the African, Asian and Oceanic zone.

Kang was ultimately chosen as one of 22 players for the World Cup team. By the time of the World Cup, he had appeared for the national team 38 times, according to the Evening Telegraph. At the World Cup, the North Korean team played their home games at Ayresome Park in Middlesbrough, England, as part of Group 4 in the tournament which included the Soviet Union, Chile and Italy. Projected as having little chance of success, the team lost their first match, 3–0 against the Soviet Union, before tying Chile 1–1. Kang played all 90 minutes against the Soviet Union, but suffered a leg injury that left him inactive for the subsequent matches. After Chile, the team then played against heavily-favored Italy to determine the qualifier to the next round. In a massive upset, North Korea won 1–0 on a goal by Pak Doo-ik. The team eventually lost 5–3 in the quarterfinals to Portugal. Kang ended the World Cup with one appearance, playing 90 minutes.

== Later life ==
For the team's performance at the World Cup, all the players who appeared in a match were given the title of Merited Athlete, the second-highest honor for sportspeople in North Korea. After the World Cup, it was rumored that the North Korean squad was imprisoned for celebrating the win over Italy in a bar; however, when interviewed in 2002, several players denied this. In 2002, the surviving members of the 1966 North Korean World Cup team were interviewed for the documentary film The Game of Their Lives; Kang was deceased by this time.
