= Kim Bong-hwan =

North Korean footballer (1939–before 2002)

- Kim, c. 1966

Personal information
- Date of birth: 4 July 1939
- Place of birth: Korea, Empire of Japan
- Date of death: before 2002
- Height: 1.67 m (5 ft 6 in)
- Position: Forward

Senior career*
Years	Team	Apps	(Gls)
- Kikwancha Pyongyang

International career
c. 1962–after 1966	North Korea	41+	
- * Club domestic league appearances and goals

Kim Bong-hwan (Korean: 김봉환; 4 July 1939 – before 2002) was a North Korean football forward who played for national team in the 1966 FIFA World Cup. He made at least 41 appearances for the national team, including one World Cup match, and was one of the players to be given the title of Merited Athlete. He also played in North Korea for the club Kikwancha Pyongyang.

== Early life ==
Kim was born on 4 July 1939 in Korea, Empire of Japan, in what became North Korea. He played at the club level for Kikwancha Pyongyang (Note: Sometimes called Kigwancha Pyongyang.) and had a height of 1.67 m (5 ft 6 in) during his playing career.

== International career ==
In 1957, the North Korea national football team was re-organized with the goal of competing at the 1966 FIFA World Cup. In c. 1962, Kim was chosen as one of the best 40 players from the North Korean leagues, whose membership reportedly consisted of over 250,000, to be considered for the national team. The 40 players were enlisted into the Army as military officers, under the leadership of colonel and coach Myung Rye-hyun, and went under strict training for the next four years in preparation for the cup. Kim and the others trained twice a day starting at 6:00 a.m. and were under other restrictions which included being unmarried, no smoking, no drinking, and (for the last six months) being in bed by 10:00 p.m.

In early 1965, the North Korean leagues were suspended to allow the roster to focus solely on the task of making the World Cup. Kim and the rest of the players gained experience by playing a number of international matches against nations including North Vietnam, Indonesia, Laos, Cambodia and China. The team competed at that year's Games of Emerging New Forces (GANEFO) and went undefeated, with a 3–1 win over China in the finals. Later in 1965, they played at the 1966 FIFA World Cup qualification and defeated Australia to become the sole qualifier from the African, Asian and Oceanic zone.

Kim, a forward, was ultimately chosen as one of 22 players for the World Cup team. Kim was the oldest member of the team at 27 years of age. By the time of the World Cup, he had appeared for the national team at least 40 times, according to the Evening Telegraph, although the Sunday Mirror reported the number to be 66 caps. At the World Cup, the North Korean team played their home games at Ayresome Park in Middlesbrough, England, as part of Group 4 in the tournament which included the Soviet Union, Chile and Italy. Projected as having little chance of success, the team lost their first match, 3–0 against the Soviet Union, before tying Chile 1–1. Kim was inactive for the first two matches. The team then played against heavily-favored Italy to determine the qualifier to the next round. In a massive upset, North Korea won 1–0 on a goal by Pak Doo-ik. Kim started the Italy match and played all 90 minutes. He was replaced by Li Dong-woon for the next match, against Portugal, which North Korea lost 5–3 to be eliminated from the World Cup. Kim ended the World Cup with one appearance, playing 90 minutes.

== Later life ==
For the team's performance at the World Cup, all the players were given the title of Merited Athlete, the second-highest honor for sportspeople in North Korea. After the World Cup, it was rumored that the North Korean squad was imprisoned for celebrating the win over Italy in a bar; however, when interviewed in 2002, several players denied this.

In 2002, the surviving members of the 1966 North Korean World Cup team were interviewed for the documentary film The Game of Their Lives; Kim was deceased by this time.
