= People's Athlete =

- Date: 8 October 1966
- Country: North Korea
- Currently held by: c. 200 sportspeople

- People's Athlete
- Hangul: 인민체육인
- Hanja: 人民體育人
- RR: Inmin cheyugin
- MR: Inmin ch'eyugin

People's Athlete (Korean: 인민체육인) is a North Korean honorary title awarded to sportspeople. It was created in 1966. It is usually reserved to those who have won in the Olympic Games or have won a world championship, as it is the most prestigious award for North Korean sportspeople.

The title is closely connected with the North Korea national football team. The title was instituted after their achievements in the 1966 FIFA World Cup. Victories in the FIFA World Cups are rewarded with the title, as well as the right to live in the capital Pyongyang, including to one's family members. Because of this and since the women's football team has done better recently, the more experienced coaches prefer to work with them rather than with the men's football team.

Another similar award is the Merited Athlete.

== History ==
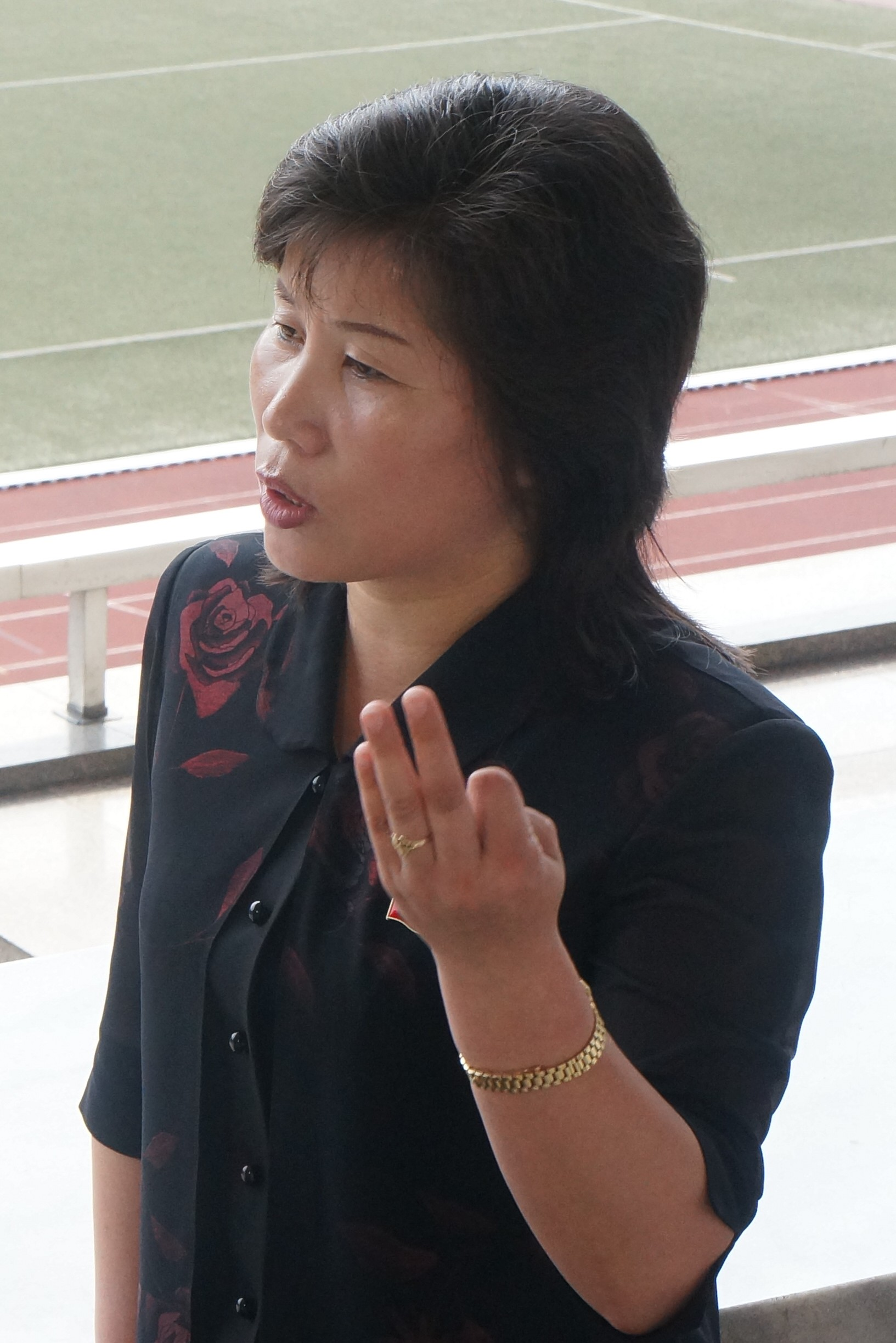
People's Athlete, marathoner Jong Song-ok

The title was instituted on 8 October 1966 by the Supreme People's Assembly. Its establishment was prompted by the North Korea national football team's success in the 1966 FIFA World Cup, where it had reached the quarter-final stage in July. The first people to receive the title were members of the team: Pak Doo-ik, Shin Yung-kyoo, and Oh Yoon-kyung, as well as Sin Kim-dan, a runner.

It was rumored in 2010 that football coach Kim Jong-hun's award was rescinded for losing a game against Portugal in the 2010 FIFA World Cup finals.

Cho Dae-won became the first baduk (Go) player to receive the award in October 2013.

As of 1984, a People's Athlete is paid a 200-won monthly wage. The sum is far greater than that of an ordinary office worker who was typically paid around 70 won. As of December 2011, around 200 people have received the title during the 45 years that had passed since its establishment. Whenever the title is conferred, the recipient also receives the Order of the National Flag, first class. Overseas Koreans have received the award, too. For instance Hong Chang-su, Jong Tae-se and An Yong-hak are North Koreans living in Japan who have been named People's Athletes.

== List of People's Athletes ==
- An Yong-hak (footballer, 2009)
- Cho Dae-won (Go player, between 2009 and 2013)
- Choe Chol-su (boxer, some time after 1992)
- Choe Kwang-sok (coach, before 2011)
- Han Pil-hwa (speed skater, 1971)
- Hong Chang-su (boxer, 2000)
- Hong Un-jong (gymnastics, 2008 or 2009)
- Jong Song-ok (marathoner, 1999)
- Jong Tae-se (footballer, 2009)
- Kim Chun-phil (coach, around 2011)
- Kim Chun-hui (weightlifting coach)
- Kim Il (wrestler)
- Kim Jong(table tennis before 2015, around 2014)
- Kim Jong-hun (football coach)
- Kim Gwang-suk (gymnastics)
- Kim Kuk-hyang (diving, 2015)
- Kim Kwang-min (football coach)
- Kim Myong-nam (weightlifter)
- Kim su ryon(Taekwondo)
- Ku Yong-jo (boxing, 1976)
- Kye Sun-hui (judoka)
- Mun Ung-jun (taekwondo coach, some time before 2015)
- Oh Yoon-kyung(footballer, 1966)
- Pae Gil-su (gymnastics)
- Pak Doo-ik (footballer, 1966)
- Pak Hyon-suk (weightlifter)
- Pak Seung-jin (football coach)
- Pak Yong-sun (table tennis)
- Pae Gil-su (gymnastics, 1992)
- Ri Chang-jong(coach)
- Ri Hak-son(wrestler, after 1992)
- Ri Ho-jun (shooting, 1973)
- Ri Kum-suk (women's football, 2003)
- Ri Song-hui (weightlifter, some time around 2000)
- Shin Jong-rim (diving coach, 2015)
- Sin Kim-dan (runner, 1966)
- Shin Yung-kyoo (footballer, 1966)

== See also ==
- Orders and medals of North Korea
- Sport in North Korea
- The Game of Their Lives (2002 film)
- People's Prize
