= Im Shung-hwi =

North Korean footballer (born 1946)

Personal information
- Date of birth: 3 February 1946 (age 80)
- Place of birth: North Korea
- Height: 1.64 m (5 ft 5 in)
- Position: Midfielder

Senior career*
| Years | Team | Apps | (Gls) |
- February 8

International career
| c. 1962–after 1966 | North Korea | 16+ | (1+) |
- * Club domestic league appearances and goals

- Im Shung-hwi
- Hangul: 임성휘
- RR: Im Seonghwi
- MR: Im Sŏnghwi

Im Shung-hwi (Korean: 임성휘; born 3 February 1946), also spelled Im Song Hwi, is a North Korean former football midfielder who played for the national team in the 1966 FIFA World Cup. He also played for February 8 Sports Club.

== Early life ==
Im was born on 3 February 1946 in North Korea. A midfielder, he played for February 8 Sports Club in the DPR Korea Premier Football League, North Korea's top football league. He had a height of 1.64 metres (5 ft 5 in) during his playing career.

== International career ==
In 1957, the North Korea national football team was re-organized with the goal of competing at the 1966 FIFA World Cup. In c. 1962, Im was chosen as one of the best 40 players from the North Korean leagues, whose membership reportedly consisted of over 250,000, to be considered for the national team. The 40 players were enlisted into the Army as military officers, under the leadership of colonel and coach Myung Rye-hyun, and went under strict training for the next four years in preparation for the cup. Im and the others trained twice a day starting at 6:00 a.m. and were under other restrictions which included being unmarried, no smoking, no drinking, and (for the last six months) being in bed by 10:00 p.m.

In early 1965, the North Korean leagues were suspended to allow the roster to focus solely on the task of making the World Cup. Im and the rest of the players gained experience by playing a number of international matches against nations including North Vietnam, Indonesia, Laos, Cambodia and China. The team competed at that year's Games of Emerging New Forces (GANEFO) and went undefeated, with a 3–1 win over China in the finals. Later in 1965, they played at the 1966 FIFA World Cup qualification and defeated Australia to become the sole qualifier from the African, Asian and Oceanic zone. Im scored a goal in one of the two games against Australia.

Im was ultimately chosen as one of 22 players for the World Cup team. By that time, he had been capped for the national team a total of 12 times, according to the Evening Telegraph, although the Sunday Mirror reported it to be 18 caps. At the World Cup, the North Korean team played their home games at Ayresome Park in Middlesbrough, England, as part of Group 4 in the tournament which included the Soviet Union, Chile and Italy. Im was considered one of the team's top players in the midfield, and The Guardian described the team's playing style as "basically 4-2-4, with Pak Seung Zin, who must have one of the hardest shots of any of the World Cup finalists, and Im Seung Hwi feeding the wings and creating openings down the middle for Pak Doo Ik." The North Koreans, projected as having little chance of success, lost their first match, 3–0 against the Soviet Union, before tying Chile 1–1. After Chile, the team then played against heavily-favored Italy to determine the qualifier to the next round. In a massive upset, North Korea won 1–0 on a goal by Pak Doo-ik. Im recorded an assist on Pak's goal, having headed the ball to him before he made the winning shot. The team eventually lost 5–3 in the quarterfinals to Portugal; the North Koreans had opened the scoring with a goal by Pak Seung-zin in the first minute, with Im having made the assist. Im ended the World Cup having appeared in all four matches, playing all 360 minutes.

== Later life ==
For the team's performance at the World Cup, all the players who appeared in a match were given the title of Merited Athlete, the second-highest honor for sportspeople in North Korea. After the World Cup, it was rumored that the North Korean squad was imprisoned for celebrating the win over Italy in a bar; however, when interviewed in 2002, several players denied this. In 2002, Im was interviewed as one of the seven surviving members of the 1966 North Korean team in the documentary The Game of Their Lives and visited Middlesbrough with his former teammates.
