= Han Bong-zin =

North Korean footballer (born 1945)

Personal information
- Date of birth: 2 September 1945 (age 81)
- Place of birth: Pyongyang, Soviet-occupied Korea
- Position: Outside forward

Senior career*
| Years | Team | Apps | (Gls) |
- 2.8 Sports Team

International career
| c 1962–after 1966 | North Korea | 53+ | |

Managerial career
- 1980–1981: North Korea
Korean name
| Hangul | 한봉진 |
| RR | Han Bongjin |
| MR | Han Pongjin |
- * Club domestic league appearances and goals

Han Bong-zin (Korean: 한봉진; born 2 September 1945), also called Han Bong Jin, is a North Korean former football player who was an outside forward for the national team in the 1966 FIFA World Cup. He also played for 2.8 Sports Team. He later served as the manager of the national team from 1980 to 1981.

== Early life ==
Han was born on 2 September 1945 in Pyongyang, the capital of North Korea. At the club level, he played for the 2.8 Sports Team in the country's top league.

== International career ==
In 1957, the North Korea national football team was re-organized with the goal of competing at the 1966 FIFA World Cup. In c. 1962, Han was chosen as one of the best 40 players from the North Korean leagues, whose membership reportedly consisted of over 250,000, to be considered for the national team. The 40 players were enlisted into the Army as military officers, under the leadership of colonel and coach Myung Rye-hyun, and went under strict training for the next four years in preparation for the cup. Han and the others trained twice a day starting at 6:00 a.m. and were under other restrictions which included being unmarried, no smoking, no drinking, and (for the last six months) being in bed by 10:00 p.m.

In early 1965, the North Korean leagues were suspended to allow the roster to focus solely on the task of making the World Cup. Han and the rest of the players gained experience by playing a number of international matches against nations including North Vietnam, Indonesia, Laos, Cambodia and China. In 1965, Han competed for the national team at the Games of Emerging New Forces (GANEFO) and helped them go undefeated with a 3–1 win over China in the finals. Later in 1965, Han was a key player at the 1966 FIFA World Cup qualification, scoring two goals over Australia in the eliminating match, which made North Korea the sole qualifier from the African, Asian and Oceanic zone.

Han, an outside right, was ultimately chosen as one of 22 players for the World Cup team. He was the most experienced player on the squad and had a cap total listed by varying sources as 49, 52, or 72 by the time of the competition. Han was considered the best member of the North Korean team and received comparisons to Garrincha for his dribbling and Bobby Charlton for his shooting. The radio station in Pyongyang alleged that he "overshadows the world-renowned Brazilian player" – Pelé. The Evening Telegraph mentioned him as being one of the top two stars of the team and noted that he "demoralised countless defences with his speed and skill, and he is a powerful two-footed kicker."

The North Korean team played all their first round games at Ayresome Park in Middlesbrough, England, as part of Group 4 in the tournament which included the Soviet Union, Chile and Italy. Projected as having little chance of success, the team lost their first match, 3–0 against the Soviet Union, before tying Chile 1–1. They then played against heavily-favored Italy to determine the qualifier to the next round. In a massive upset, North Korea won 1–0 on a goal by Pak Doo-ik. The team eventually lost 5–3 in the quarterfinals to Portugal. Han started each of the four of the World Cup matches and played all 360 minutes.

== Later life ==
For the team's performance at the World Cup, all the players who appeared in a match were given the title of Merited Athlete, the second-highest honor for sportspeople in North Korea. After the World Cup, it was rumored that the North Korean squad was imprisoned for celebrating the win over Italy in a bar; however, when interviewed in 2002, several players denied this.

Han later managed the North Korean national team from July 1980 to December 1981. In 2002, he was interviewed as one of the seven surviving members of the 1966 North Korean team in the documentary The Game of Their Lives and visited Middlesbrough with his former teammates. As of that year, he was serving as a coach and technical director for Pyongyang Sports Club.
