= Kim Jong-min (footballer, born 1947) =

North Korean footballer (born 1947)

Personal information
- Date of birth: 19 April 1947 (age 79)
- Place of birth: North Korea
- Position: Defender

Senior career*
Years	Team	Apps	(Gls)
- April 25 Sports Club

International career
1973–after 1978	North Korea	10+	(2+)

Managerial career
- 1989–1990: North Korea
- * Club domestic league appearances and goals

- Kim Jong-min
- Hangul: 김정민
- RR: Gim Jeongmin
- MR: Kim Chŏngmin

Kim Jong-min (born 19 April 1947) is a North Korean former footballer and coach. He played for the North Korea national football team in the 1970s, appearing at the 1974 Asian Games, 1976 Summer Olympics and 1978 Asian Games, helping North Korea win the gold medal at the last event. He later managed the national team from 1989 to 1990 and owned Hwaebul Sports Club in the DPR Korea Football League. He was awarded the title of Merited Athlete.

== Biography ==
Kim was born on 19 April 1947 in North Korea. He played football as a defender and was a member of April 25 Sports Club in the DPR Korea Premier Football League, the top league North Korea.

Kim was called up to the North Korea national football team for the first time in May 1973, to take part for the team in the 1974 FIFA World Cup qualification. Members of Group B2 including Iran, Syria and Kuwait, Kim appeared in five of six matches as North Korea finished with one win, three draws and two losses, placing third and being eliminated. In their 1–1 tie against Syria, Kim scored the team's only goal in the 53rd minute.

Kim later played for North Korea at the 1974 Asian Games, where they reached the bronze medal match. After falling down 1–0 to Malaysia, Kim scored a goal in the 58th minute to tie the score but the team ultimately lost by a score of 2–1. In 1976, he was selected as part of the 17-man squad to compete for North Korea at the 1976 Summer Olympics, under coach Pak Doo-ik. He started all three of the North Koreans' matches, as they reached the quarterfinals before losing 5–0 to Poland. In 1978, he was selected for the 1978 Asian Games and was the team captain. North Korea advanced through the tournament and reached the gold medal match where they played South Korea to a 0–0 draw, with both nations sharing the gold medal.

After his playing career, Kim became a coach. In May 1989, he succeeded Pak Do-ik as coach of the national team. He coached them at the 1990 FIFA World Cup qualification, where they were eliminated in the final round, and coached them at the 1990 Dynasty Cup, where they finished third place. He later became the owner of Hwaebul Sports Club, a club founded in 2013. They placed third in their league in their first season and later won several matches in the Paektusan Prize, the Poch'ŏnbo Torch Prize, and other competitions. The club competed at the 2018 AFC Cup.

Outside of his football career, Kim worked at the Mangyongdae District Waterworks Management Office. He was awarded the title of Merited Athlete, given to those who make "distinguished contributions" to North Korean sports, and received a "modern house," according to Rodong Sinmun.
