= Giorgi Sichinava =

Soviet footballer

Giorgi Sitchinava
Personal information
- Full name: Giorgi Vladimirovich Sitchinava
- Date of birth: 15 September 1944 (age 82)
- Place of birth: Gagra, USSR
- Position: Midfielder

Senior career*
Years	Team	Apps	(Gls)
1960–1969	FC Dinamo Tbilisi	162	(8)
1971–1972	Metallurg Rustavi		

International career
1964–1966	USSR	8	(0)
- * Club domestic league appearances and goals

Giorgi Vladimirovich Sitchinava (Georgian: გიორგი სიჭინავა, born 15 September 1944 in Gagra) is a retired Soviet football player.

== Honours ==
- Soviet Top League winner: 1964

== International career ==
Sichinava made his debut for USSR on 22 November 1964 in a friendly against Yugoslavia. He played at the 1966 FIFA World Cup, where USSR made it to the semi-finals.
