= Aldo Valentini =

Chilean footballer (1938-2009)

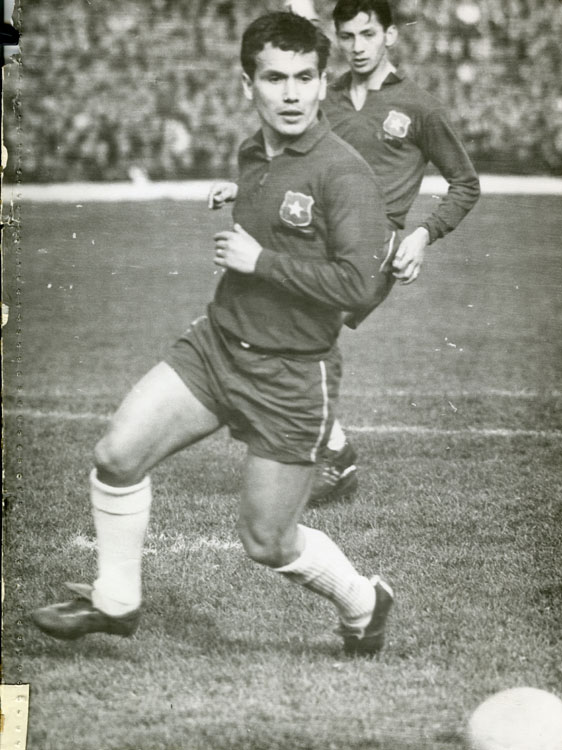
- Aldo Valentini (1966)

Personal information
- Full name: Aldo Alberto Valentini González
- Date of birth: 25 November 1938
- Place of birth: Chile
- Date of death: 25 October 2009 (aged 70)
- Position: Defender

Senior career*
Years	Team	Apps	(Gls)
- Colo-Colo

International career
1960–1966	Chile	19	(0)
- * Club domestic league appearances and goals

Aldo Alberto Valentini González (25 November 1938 – 25 October 2009) was a Chilean football defender who played for Chile in the 1966 FIFA World Cup. He also played for Colo-Colo.
