= North Korea at the AFC Asian Cup =

National football delegation

North Korea has participated in five AFC Asian Cup tournaments, and finished in fourth place, their best performance to date, during their maiden appearance in 1980.

However, unlike their Southern neighbor, North Korea often struggles to have the best performances, due to poor quality of the national team and their squad, as well as outside sanctions on the nation for its repressive nature. North Korea, after their 1980 appearance, would have to wait for 12 years for their next qualification, and they made further tournament appearances in the 2011, 2015 and 2019 editions. North Korea has not won an Asian Cup match since 1980, a drought of nearly 40 years.

== 1980 Asian Cup ==
=== Group A ===
Team	Pld	W	D	L	GF	GA	GD	Pts
Iran	4	2	2	0	12	4	+8	6
North Korea	4	3	0	1	9	7	+2	6
Syria	4	2	1	1	3	2	+1	5
China	4	1	1	2	9	5	+4	3
Bangladesh	4	0	0	4	2	17	−15	0

16 September 1980

North Korea	3–2	Bangladesh
Choi Jae-pil 44', 45'; Kim Jong-man 90'		Salahuddin 60' (pen.); Chunnu 88'

Sabah Al-Salem Stadium, Kuwait City

18 September 1980

North Korea	2–1	China
Kim Bok-man 20'		Li Fubao 7'

Sabah Al-Salem Stadium, Kuwait City

24 September 1980

Iran	3–2	North Korea
Alidousti 27'; Danaeifard 57'; Fariba 60'		Hwang Sang-hoi 68'; Pak Jong-hun 90'

Sabah Al-Salem Stadium, Kuwait City
Attendance: 4,000
Referee: Enrique Mendoza (Mexico)

26 September 1980

North Korea	2–1	Syria
		Suleiman

Sabah Al-Salem Stadium, Kuwait City

=== Semi-finals ===
28 September 1980
19:30

South Korea	2–1	North Korea
Chung Hae-won 80', 89'		Pak Jong-hun 19' (pen.)

Sabah Al-Salem Stadium, Kuwait City
Attendance: 20,000
Referee: Toshikazu Sano (Japan)

=== Third place play-off ===
29 September 1980

Iran	3–0	North Korea
Fariba 49'; Faraki 66', 76'

Sabah Al-Salem Stadium, Kuwait City
Attendance: 10,000
Referee: Enrique Mendoza (Mexico)

== 1992 Asian Cup ==
=== Group A ===
Team	Pts	Pld	W	D	L	GF	GA	GD
Japan	5	3	1	2	0	2	1	+1
United Arab Emirates	5	3	1	2	0	2	1	+1
Iran	4	3	1	1	1	2	1	+1
North Korea	1	3	0	1	2	2	5	−3

30 October 1992
17:00

North Korea	0–2	Iran
	Report	Pious 30'; Ghayeghran 80'

Bingo Sports Park, Onomichi
Attendance: 8,000
Referee: Omer Al Mehannah (Saudi Arabia)

1 November 1992
14:00

Japan	1–1	North Korea
Nakayama 80'	Report	Kim Kwang-min 29' (pen.)

Hiroshima Big Arch, Hiroshima
Attendance: 32,000
Referee: Rasheed Al-Jassas (Kuwait)

3 November 1992
12:00

United Arab Emirates	2–1	North Korea
K. Saad 81'; Bakhit 85'	Report	Kim Kwang-min 69'

Hiroshima Big Arch, Hiroshima
Attendance: 33,000
Referee: Neji Jouini (Tunisia)

== 2011 Asian Cup ==
=== Group D ===
Team	Pld	W	D	L	GF	GA	GD	Pts
Iran	3	3	0	0	6	1	+5	9
Iraq	3	2	0	1	3	2	+1	6
North Korea	3	0	1	2	0	2	−2	1
United Arab Emirates	3	0	1	2	0	4	−4	1

11 January 2011
North Korea	0–0	United Arab Emirates
15 January 2011
Iran	1–0	North Korea
19 January 2011
Iraq	1–0	North Korea

== 2015 Asian Cup ==
=== Group B ===
Pos	Team	Pld	W	D	L	GF	GA	GD	Pts	Qualification
1	China	3	3	0	0	5	2	+3	9	Advance to knockout stage
2	Uzbekistan	3	2	0	1	5	3	+2	6	Advance to knockout stage
3	Saudi Arabia	3	1	0	2	5	5	0	3	
4	North Korea	3	0	0	3	2	7	−5	0	

Source: Asian Cup Australia 2015
Rules for classification: Tiebreakers

10 January 2015
Uzbekistan	1–0	North Korea	Stadium Australia, Sydney
14 January 2015
North Korea	1–4	Saudi Arabia	AAMI Park, Melbourne
18 January 2015
China	2–1	North Korea	Canberra Stadium, Canberra

== 2019 Asian Cup ==
=== Group E ===
Pos	Team	Pld	W	D	L	GF	GA	GD	Pts	Qualification
1	Qatar	3	3	0	0	10	0	+10	9	Advance to knockout stage
2	Saudi Arabia	3	2	0	1	6	2	+4	6	Advance to knockout stage
3	Lebanon	3	1	0	2	4	5	−1	3	
4	North Korea	3	0	0	3	1	14	−13	0	

Source: AFC
8 January 2019
20:00

Saudi Arabia	4–0	North Korea
Bahebri 28'; Al-Fatil 37'; Al-Dawsari 70'; Al-Muwallad 87'	Report

Rashid Stadium, Dubai
Attendance: 5,075
Referee: Peter Green (Australia)

13 January 2019
15:00

North Korea	0–6	Qatar
	Report	Ali 9', 11', 55', 60'; Khoukhi 43'; A. Hassan 68'

Khalifa bin Zayed Stadium, Al Ain
Attendance: 452
Referee: Hettikamkanamge Perera (Sri Lanka)

17 January 2019
20:00

Lebanon	4–1	North Korea
F. Michel Melki 27'; El-Helwe 65', 90+8'; Maatouk 80' (pen.)	Report	Pak Kwang-ryong 9'

Sharjah Stadium, Sharjah
Attendance: 4,332
Referee: Chris Beath (Australia)

== Overall record ==
AFC Asian Cup record									Qualification record					
Year	Result	Position	Pld	W	D*	L	GF	GA	Pld	W	D*	L	GF	GA
(Hong Kong) 1956	Not an AFC member								Not an AFC member					
(South Korea) 1960	Not an AFC member								Not an AFC member					
(Israel) 1964	Not an AFC member								Not an AFC member					
(Iran) 1968	Not an AFC member								Not an AFC member					
(Thailand) 1972	Not an AFC member								Not an AFC member					
(Iran) 1976	Withdrew after qualifying								5	3	1	1	7	4
(Kuwait) 1980	Fourth place	4th	6	3	0	3	10	12	5	4	1	0	9	2
(Singapore) 1984	Did not enter								Did not enter					
(Qatar) 1988	Did not qualify								4	2	1	1	3	2
(Japan) 1992	Group stage	8th	3	0	1	2	2	5	3	2	1	0	8	0
(United Arab Emirates) 1996	Did not enter								Did not enter					
(Lebanon) 2000	Did not qualify								6	3	2	1	11	7
(China) 2004	Did not qualify								8	1	2	5	3	15
(Indonesia) (Malaysia) (Thailand) (Vietnam) 2007	Banned								Banned					
(Qatar) 2011	Group stage	12th	3	0	1	2	0	2	Qualified as 2010 AFC Challenge Cup winners					
(Australia) 2015	Group stage	14th	3	0	0	3	2	7	Qualified as 2012 AFC Challenge Cup winners					
(United Arab Emirates) 2019	Group stage	24th	3	0	0	3	1	14	14	8	3	3	27	18
(Qatar) 2023	Withdrew								Withdrew during qualifying					
(Saudi Arabia) 2027	Qualified								6	3	0	3	11	7
Total	Fourth place	6/19	18	3	2	13	15	40	51	26	11	14	76	55

== See also ==
- North Korea at the FIFA World Cup
