= Rudolf Kreitlein =

German football referee (1919–2012)

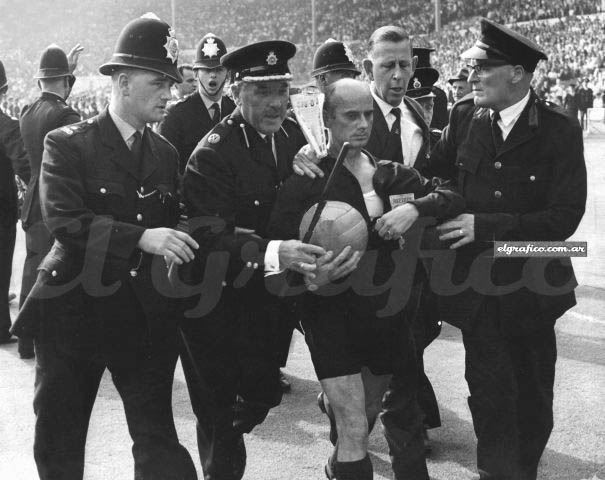
- Kreitlein (holding the ball) retires from the pitch escorted by the police, after the controversial England v Argentina match in 1966
- Born: 14 November 1919; Fürth, Weimar Republic
- Died: 31 July 2012 (aged 92); Stuttgart, Germany
- Other occupation: Tailor

Domestic
Years	League	Role
1963–1969	Bundesliga	Referee

International
Years	League	Role
1966	UEFA	Referee

Rudolf Kreitlein (14 November 1919 – 31 July 2012) was a German international football referee who was active in the 1960s.

== England v Argentina, 1966 World Cup ==
Kreitlein is perhaps best known for having refereed the 1966 World Cup quarter-final match between England and Argentina in which he dismissed Antonio Rattín from the field of play in the 35th minute of the game for a second caution - dissent. Rattín initially refused to leave the pitch, arguing furiously with Kreitlein (even though neither man understood each other's native language) and the game was held up for several minutes until Rattín reluctantly departed. It was also during this game that Jack Charlton was cautioned, only to discover the fact the next day from the newspaper report. As a result of this incident, Kreitlein and Ken Aston developed the idea of yellow cards and red cards to aid on-field communication in football. Kreitlein, who had never seen the match, requested a copy of the game from the Football Association in 2006. Kreitlein retired from international competition in 1967.

== Career ==
Kreitlein began his refereeing career at the age of 17, and soon moved to the US to train referees. He subsequently returned to Germany, where he tried to become a professional footballer. However, a serious knee injury ended this aspiration, and he concentrated on refereeing instead. Kreitlein's rise to prominence within the European game was evident prior to the World Cup. He had been appointed as one of the German representatives for the 1963 UEFA European Under-18 Championship in England, refereeing the final between England and Northern Ireland at Wembley (his assistants were the Hungarian orchestral conductor and referee István Zsolt and the Belgian Mark Raemaekers).

Kreitlein had been a Bundesliga referee from its inauguration in 1963 but had only refereed 36 matches at national level before being appointed referee (in May 1966) to the European Cup final, where he took charge of the game between Real Madrid and Partizan Belgrade in Brussels.

== Personal life ==
Kreitlein worked as a tailor. He was married, but had no children. His wife died in 2008.
