= Li Chan-myung =

North Korean footballer (born 1947)

Personal information
- Date of birth: 2 January 1947 (age 79)
- Place of birth: North Korea
- Height: 1.68 m (5 ft 6 in)
- Position: Goalkeeper

Senior career*
Years	Team	Apps	(Gls)
- Kigwancha Sports Club

International career
	North Korea	12	(0)
- * Club domestic league appearances and goals

- Li Chan-myung
- Hangul: 리찬명
- RR: Ri Chanmyeong
- MR: Ri Ch'anmyŏng

Li Chan-myung (a.k.a. Ri Chan Myong; Korean: 리찬명; born 2 January 1947) is a North Korean former football goalkeeper who played for North Korea in the 1966 FIFA World Cup. He also played for Kigwancha Sports Club, which is based in Sinuiju.
