= Myong Dong-chan =

North Korean footballer

Personal information
- Date of birth: 8 January 1948
- Date of death: 1999 (aged 50–51)
- Position: Midfielder

International career
Years	Team	Apps	(Gls)
- North Korea

- Myong Dong-chan
- Hangul: 명동찬
- RR: Myeong Dongchan
- MR: Myŏng Tongch'an

Myong Dong-chan (8 January 1948 – 1999) was a North Korean footballer. He competed in the men's tournament at the 1976 Summer Olympics. He coached North Korea national football team and national women's national football team. He died of liver cancer in 1999.
