= Pierre Schwinte =

French football referee (1922–2000)

- Born: 6 March 1922; Strasbourg, France
- Died: 11 March 2000 (aged 78)

International
Years	League	Role
1956–1966	FIFA-listed	Referee

Pierre Schwinte (born 6 March 1922 – 11 March 2000) was a French football referee notable for his officiating in both domestic and international matches during the 1960s. Schwinte gained recognition for his role in several important matches, including the 1966 FIFA World Cup semi-final and various European club competitions.

== Career ==
Schwinte officiated matches in France's top-tier league, Ligue 1, which laid the foundation for his selection to referee in international competitional Refereeing Schwinte's international refereeing career peaked during the 1960s. He was appointed to officiate matches in the 1966 FIFA World Cup, hosted by England. In that tournament, he refereed the semi-final match between England and Portugal, one of the most significant fixtures of the tournament. The match saw England win 2–1, securing a place in the final, where they ultimately triumphed over West Germany to win their first World Cup.

Schwinte was an official in other international competitions, including the European Cup (now UEFA Champions League) and the Cup Winners' Cup, where he officiated high-profile matches involving prominent European clubs.
