= Yang Song-guk =

North Korean footballer

Personal information
- Date of birth: 19 August 1944 (age 82)
- Place of birth: Korea
- Position: Forward

Senior career*
| Years | Team | Apps | (Gls) |
- Kigwancha

International career
| | North Korea | | (1) |
- * Club domestic league appearances and goals

- Yang Song-guk
- Hangul: 양성국
- RR: Yang Seongguk
- MR: Yang Sŏngguk

Yang Song-guk (Korean: 양성국; born 19 August 1944) is a North Korean football forward who played for North Korea in the 1966 FIFA World Cup. There he scored against Portugal in the Quarter-finals at Goodison Park. He also played for Kigwancha Pyongyang. He also competed in the men's tournament at the 1976 Summer Olympics.
