= Juan Gardeazábal =

Spanish football referee

- Full name: Juan Gardeazábal Garay
- Born: 27 November 1923; Bilbao, Spain
- Died: 21 December 1969 (aged 46); Bilbao, Spain

International
Years	League	Role
1946–1969	FIFA-listed	Referee

Juan Gardeazábal Garay (27 November 1923 – 21 December 1969) was a Spanish referee.

He served as a referee in three FIFA World Cups (1958, 1962, and 1966), in which he directed a total of seven games as the main referee and six as a linesman.

He was also selected to referee at the 1970 FIFA World Cup in Mexico, but he died a few months before the event.
