= Shin Yung-kyoo =

North Korean footballer (1942–1996)

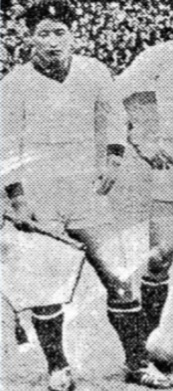

Personal information
- Date of birth: 30 March 1942
- Place of birth: Korea, Empire of Japan
- Date of death: 18 March 1996 (aged 53)
- Place of death: Belarus
- Height: 1.74 m (5 ft 9 in)
- Position: Defender

Senior career*
Years	Team	Apps	(Gls)
- Moranbong Sports Club

International career
- North Korea
- * Club domestic league appearances and goals

- Shin Yung-kyoo
- Hangul: 신영규
- RR: Sin Yeonggyu
- MR: Sin Yŏnggyu

Shin Yung-kyoo (30 March 1942 – 18 March 1996) was a North Korean football defender who played for North Korea in the 1966 FIFA World Cup. He also played for Moranbong Sports Team.
