= Rubén Marcos =

Chilean footballer (1942–2006)

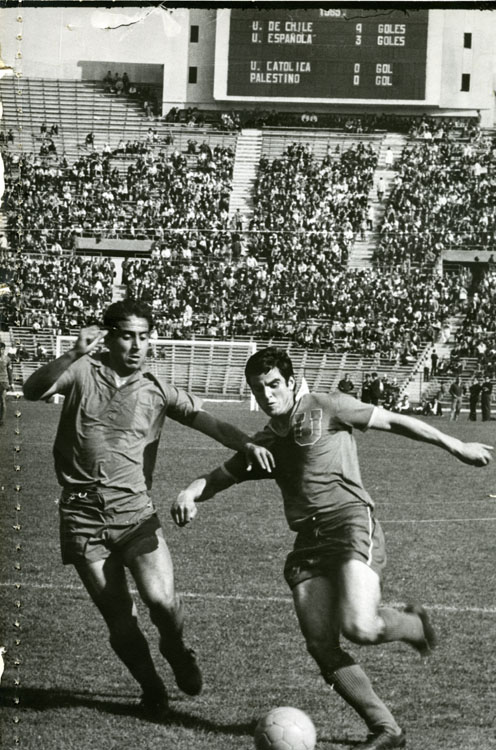
- Marcos in 1966

Personal information
- Full name: Héctor Rubén Marcos Peralta
- Date of birth: 6 December 1942
- Place of birth: Osorno, Chile
- Date of death: 14 August 2006 (aged 63)
- Place of death: Osorno, Chile
- Position: Midfielder

Senior career*
Years	Team	Apps	(Gls)
1962–1970	Universidad de Chile		
1971	Emelec		
1971–1974	Palestino		

International career
1963–1969	Chile	35	(8)

Managerial career
- 1999: Provincial Osorno (interim)
- * Club domestic league appearances and goals

Héctor Rubén Marcos Peralta (6 December 1942 – 14 August 2006), known as Rubén Marcos, was a Chilean footballer who played as a midfielder. Usually a central midfielder, he was well known for his versatility and stamina. Capable both in attack and defense, Marcos was also technically skilled and is one of the most highly regarded Chilean midfielders.

== Career ==
Marcos was born in Osorno, Chile. During his career, he played for Universidad de Chile and Palestino in Chile and for Emelec in Ecuador. He also played for the Chile national football team and took part in the 1966 FIFA World Cup (where he scored two goals) and the South American Championship 1967.

On 6 April 1965, Marcos was one of the constituent footballers of SIFUP, the trade union of professionales footballers in Chile, alongside fellows such as Pedro Araya, Manuel Astorga, Juan Rodríguez Vega, among others.

In 1999, he performed as President, interim coach and director of Provincial Osorno.

== Death ==
Marcos died of a heart attack in Osorno at age 63.

== Legacy ==
Estadio Rubén Marcos Peralta at Osorno was named after him.

== Honors ==
Universidad de Chile

- Primera División de Chile: 1962, 1964, 1965, 1967, 1969
- Copa Francisco Candelori: 1969
- Torneo Metropolitano de Chile: 1968, 1969

Chile

- Copa del Pacífico: 1965, 1968
