= Ali Kandil =

Egyptian football referee (1920–1990s)

- Born: 20 December 1920
- Died: around 1990–1992
- Occupation: football referee

Ali Hussein Kandil (Arabic: على قنديل ʿAlī Qandīl; 20 December 1920 – between 1990 and 1992) was an Egyptian football referee. He directed the match between Korea DPR and Chile in the 1966 FIFA World Cup which ended in a 1-1 draw.

Kandil was also the referee for the controversial Mexico-El Salvador game at the 1970 FIFA World Cup. Just before half time, Mexico scored their first goal, it appeared to be unclear whether Kandil had signaled a foul for Mexico or a throw in for El Salvador. The El Salvador players protested by refusing to resume the game, continually moving the ball from the centre spot. Their captain Salvador Mariona eventually kicking the ball from the centre circle over the touch line. Kandil signaled for half time. After half time Mexico added three more goals and won 4-0.

During the 48th FIFA Congress in July 1992, it was announced that Kandil had died.
