= 1966 FIFA World Cup qualification (Africa, Asia and Oceania) =

1966 FIFA World Cup qualification (AFC and OFC)
Tournament details
- Dates: 21–24 November 1965
- Teams: 2

Tournament statistics
- Matches played: 2
- Goals scored: 11 (5.5 per match)
- Attendance: 115,000 (57,500 per match)
- Top scorer: (North Korea) Pak Seung-zin (3 goals)

21 teams entered the 1966 FIFA World Cup qualification rounds for the African, Asian, and Oceanian zone (Confederation of African Football, Asian Football Confederation, and what later would become the Oceania Football Confederation).

Before the start of play, the entries of the Philippines and the Republic of the Congo were rejected, the Philippines due to late payment of the entry fee and the Republic of the Congo due to submitting their application after the deadline.

South Africa, who had been moved to the Asia/Oceania zone, were disqualified in September 1964 after being previously suspended by FIFA due to apartheid, while all 15 African teams boycotted the competition in protest in October 1964 after FIFA, citing competitive and logistical issues, confirmed that there would be no direct qualification for an African team.

South Korea were subsequently forced to withdraw on 2 November 1965 due to logistical difficulties after the three-team tournament was moved from Japan to Cambodia, leaving only Australia and North Korea to contest the place on offer: North Korea easily won both legs and qualified.

== Format ==
The plans were for four rounds of play:

- Africa first round: The 15 African teams were divided into six groups of two or three teams. The group winners would advance to the second round.
- Africa second round: The six group winners were divided into three groups and would play against each other on a home-and-away basis. The winners would advance to the final round.
- Asia–Oceania first round: Australia, North Korea, South Africa and South Korea would play each other twice in a round-robin tournament at a neutral venue, originally scheduled to be in Japan but ultimately played in Cambodia.
- Final round: The Asia/Oceania winner would play the three African winners on a home-and-away basis. The winner would qualify.

== Africa first round ==
The original group draws were:

Group 1
- Ghana
- Guinea

Group 2
- Cameroon
- Sudan

Group 3
- Algeria
- Liberia
- Tunisia

Group 4
- Mali
- Morocco
- Senegal

Group 5
- Ethiopia
- Gabon

Group 6
- Libya
- Nigeria
- United Arab Republic

The second round pairings were scheduled as follows: Group 1 winners v Group 5 winners, Group 2 winners v Group 4 winners and Group 3 winners v Group 6 winners. These would be played home-and-away, with the winners advancing to the Final Round.

As all fifteen teams boycotted in protest after FIFA declined to allocate a direct qualifying place for an African team, the African first and second rounds were scratched.

== Asia–Oceania first round ==
Originally, this was scheduled as a four-team tournament between Australia, North Korea, South Africa and South Korea, to be played in Japan. Before the tournament began, South Africa were disqualified after being suspended by FIFA due to apartheid, and South Korea were subsequently forced to withdraw due to logistical difficulties after the tournament was moved to Cambodia. Further complicating matters, North Korea lacked diplomatic relations with most countries and did not have a FIFA-standard venue at the time, while Australian immigration laws then in force meant the North Korean team would be unlikely to receive visas to enter the country.

As such, finding a venue for the matches proved difficult until head of state Norodom Sihanouk, an ally of Kim Il-sung, allowed the matches to be held in Phnom Penh.

Pos	Team	Pld	W	D	L	GF	GA	GD	Pts	Qualification
1	North Korea	2	2	0	0	9	2	+7	4	1966 FIFA World Cup
2	Australia	2	0	0	2	2	9	−7	0	
—	South Africa	0	0	0	0	0	0	0	0	Disqualified
—	South Korea	0	0	0	0	0	0	0	0	Withdrew

Updated to match(es) played on unknown. Source:
21 November 1965

North Korea	6–1	Australia
Pak Doo-ik 15'; Pak Seung-zin 54', 80'; Im Seung-hwi 58'; Han Bong-zin 65', 88'		Scheinflug 70' (pen.)

National Olympic Stadium, Phnom Penh (Cambodia)
Attendance: 60,000
Referee: Patrick Nice (Malaysia)

24 November 1965

Australia	1–3	North Korea
Scheinflug 15'		Kim Seung-il 18', 75'; Pak Seung-zin 53'

National Olympic Stadium, Phnom Penh (Cambodia)
Attendance: 55,000
Referee: AG de Silva (Singapore)

== Qualified teams ==
The following team from AFC qualified for the final tournament.

Team	Qualified as	Qualified on	Previous appearances in FIFA World Cup^{1}
North Korea	First round winners	24 November 1965	0 (debut)

^{1} Bold indicates champions for that year. Italic indicates hosts for that year.

== Goalscorers ==
3 goals

- (North Korea) Pak Seung-zin

2 goals

- (Australia) Les Scheinflug
- (North Korea) Han Bong-zin
- (North Korea) Kim Seung-il

1 goal

- (North Korea) Im Seung-hwi
- (North Korea) Pak Doo-ik
