= Ayresome Park =

Football stadium in Yorkshire, England, 1903–1997

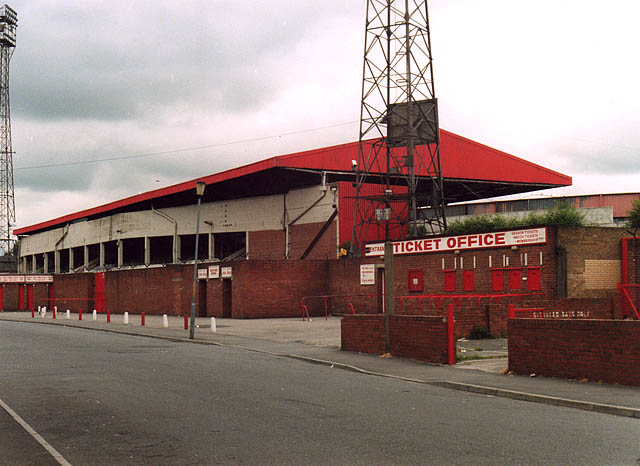
- The east stand, in 1995
- Interactive map of Ayresome Park
- Full name: Ayresome Park
- Location: Ayresome Park Road, Middlesbrough, North Yorkshire
- Coordinates: 54°33′51″N 1°14′49″W
- Owner: Middlesbrough
- Operator: Middlesbrough
- Capacity: 26,667
- Surface: Grass
- Field size: 114 × 74 yards

Construction
- Opened: 1903
- Closed: 1995
- Demolished: 1997
- Architect: Archibald Leitch

Ayresome Park was a football stadium in the Ayresome area of Middlesbrough, North Yorkshire, England. It was the home of Middlesbrough from its construction in time for the 1903–04 season, until the Riverside Stadium opened in 1995. It was demolished in 1997 and replaced with housing.

== History ==
Middlesbrough had previously played at Linthorpe Road West cricket ground, but election to the Football League meant that an improved stadium was required. Ayresome Park was built at Paradise Field, adjacent to the old Paradise Ground of Middlesbrough Ironopolis, who had played in the Football League in the 1893–94 season.

The highest attendance at the ground (53,802) was set on 27 December 1949, when Middlesbrough played their North East rivals Newcastle United. Ayresome Park was also one of the venues for the 1966 FIFA World Cup. Three games were played at the ground, involving the Soviet Union, North Korea, Italy and Chile. North Korea famously beat Italy 1–0 at the ground, to knock one of the most powerful footballing nations out of the tournament and in the process, advance the Koreans to the quarter-finals. The attendances at Ayresome Park, however, were among the lowest in the tournament, with a low of 15,887 fans at the game for North Korea versus Chile.

Middlesbrough famously had to play their first home game of the 1986–87 season at Hartlepool because they were locked out of Ayresome Park by the bailiffs, due to huge debts which almost put the club out of business. However, they were soon back at Ayresome Park after a takeover deal saved the club, with their attendances and fortunes on the pitch both improving almost immediately.

Despite this crisis, a £1.2 million sports centre was opened at the stadium on 3 March 1986 after a six-year delay caused by fire and safety regulations.

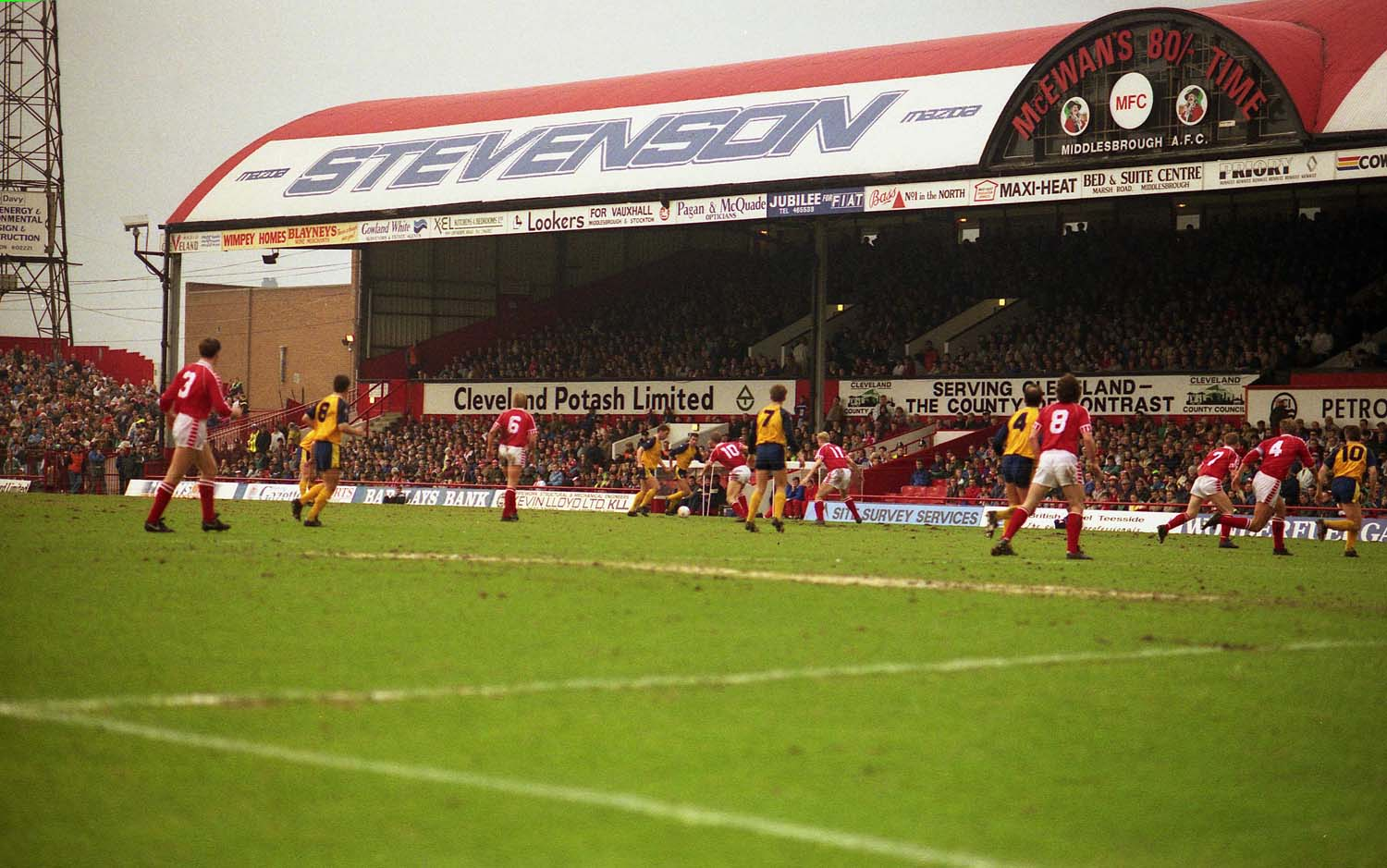
Middlesbrough playing at Ayresome Park in 1991

By the early 1990s, the stadium was showing its age and clearly in need of major work to bring it up to date. The demands of the Taylor Report meant that all stadiums in the highest two divisions of English football had to be all-seater by the start of the 1994–95 season. The surrounding residential area gave limited scope for expansion to an all-seater capacity of no more than 20,000, and with the club wanting a considerably bigger capacity, by 1993 the decision had been made to relocate the club to a new site in the town's docks area.

Plans for a new 30,000-seat stadium on the banks of the River Tees were given the go-ahead in the spring of 1994, and construction work began that autumn, with the new stadium being ready for the 1995–96 season; when it became the first new stadium to be built by a top division club since Manchester City moved to Maine Road in 1923.

The final competitive game at Ayresome Park was played against Luton Town on 30 April 1995 in a match which Boro won 2–1 to secure the Division One title and promotion to the Premier League, two years after being relegated. It was also a fine first season in management for the club's new manager Bryan Robson.

John Hendrie, a key player for Boro during the first half of the 1990s, earned the honour of scoring the final competitive goal at Ayresome Park.

The very last game at the ground was a sell-out testimonial match for long-serving goalkeeper Stephen Pears, who scored the ground's final goal, scoring from the penalty spot in a 3–1 win for Peter Beardsley's select XI against the Middlesbrough promotion winning side. The select XI's other goals were scored by Beardsley and Bernie Slaven; Paul Wilkinson scoring the Boro's only goal. Boro received the First Division Championship Trophy following the game.

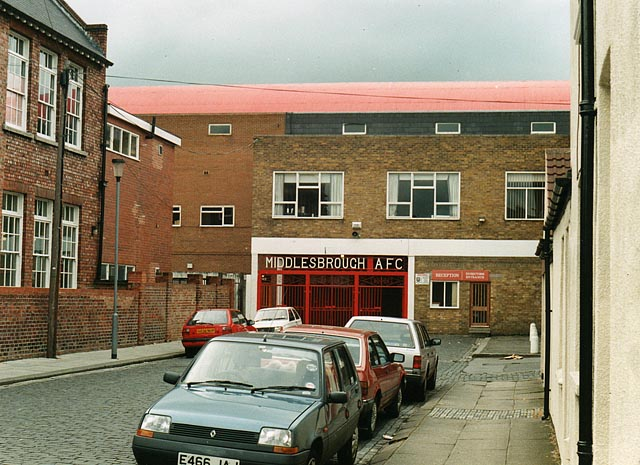
Ayresome Park main entrance

Ayresome Park was retained as a training ground for a year until a new facility was opened, and it was finally demolished in early 1997. The site of the stadium is now a park and garden. To commemorate the old ground, the gates of Ayresome Park have been erected outside the main entrance to the club's new ground, the Riverside Stadium.

== 1966 World Cup matches at Ayresome Park ==
Tuesday 12 July 1966
19:30 BST

Soviet Union	3–0	North Korea
Malofeyev 31', 88'; Banishevskiy 33'	Report

Ayresome Park, Middlesbrough
Attendance: 22,568
Referee: Juan Gardeazábal Garay (Spain)

Friday 15 July 1966
19:30 BST

Chile	1–1	North Korea
Marcos 26' (pen.)	Report	Pak Seung-Zin 88'

Ayresome Park, Middlesbrough
Attendance: 15,887
Referee: Ali Kandil (United Arab Republic)

Tuesday 19 July 1966
19:30 BST

North Korea	1–0	Italy
Pak Doo-Ik 42'	Report

Ayresome Park, Middlesbrough
Attendance: 18,727
Referee: Pierre Schwinte (France)
