= Pak Seung-zin =

North Korean footballer

Personal information
- Date of birth: 11 January 1941
- Place of birth: Wonsan, Korea, Empire of Japan (now North Korea)
- Date of death: 5 August 2011 (aged 70)
- Position: Forward

Senior career*
Years	Team	Apps	(Gls)
- Moranbong Sports Group

International career
- North Korea
- * Club domestic league appearances and goals

- Pak Seung-zin
- Hangul: 박승진
- Hanja: 朴承振
- RR: Bak Seungjin
- MR: Pak Sŭngjin

Pak Seung-zin (a.k.a. Pak Sung Jin; 11 January 1941 – 5 August 2011) was a North Korean footballer. He represented North Korea at the 1966 FIFA World Cup in England, scoring two goals, against Chile and Portugal. He was the first Asian footballer to score a goal in the World Cup.

== Career ==
In his book, The Aquariums of Pyongyang, North Korean defector Kang Chol-hwan claimed that he met Pak in the Yodok concentration camp. He says that Pak and other players on the 1966 team were imprisoned for celebrating the team's victory over Italy in a bar, which was seen as "a sign of bourgeois decadence" by North Korean officials. According to Kang, Pak was in the camp for over 20 years. However, in the documentary film The Game of Their Lives, Pak and the other players were interviewed and denied there had been any retribution.
