= Merited Athlete =

- Awarded for: "[Making] distinguished contributions to the nation's athletics, receiving the love and respect of the people for devoting [one's self] to national and social projects"
- Country: North Korea

- Merited Athlete
- Chosŏn'gŭl: 공훈체육인
- Hancha: 功勳體育人
- Revised Romanization: Gonghun cheyugin
- McCune–Reischauer: Konghun ch'eyugin

Merited Athlete is an honorary title of North Korea given to sports persons. It is awarded to "athletes and workers engaged in the athletic field who make distinguished contributions to the nation's athletics, receiving the love and respect of the people for devoting themselves to national and social projects". A typical achievement is winning a regional competition in Asia. The title was instituted in November 1960.

As of 1984, Merited Athletes are paid a 70-won (32-dollar) monthly pension after they retire at age 60, equivalent to an ordinary office worker's pay. Merited Athletes have also been given luxurious apartments. A Merited Athlete may become a sporting coach if they complete a four-year course at the Korean Athletics University.

Sports persons may also be awarded the titles of People's Athlete or Hero of Labour.

== Recipients ==
In 2001, the Korean Central News Agency (KCNA) reported that 320 or more people have been awarded either the title of Merited Athlete or the related title of People's Athlete since 1986. As of December 2011, around 200 people in total had received the title of People's Athlete.

=== List ===
Name	Occupation	Notes	Ref
Cha Hyon-hyang	female judoka	coached by Ri Song-cho	
Choe Chang-sop	marathoner	winner of the Košice Peace Marathon in 1975	
Ji Kyong-sun	female judoka	coached by Ri Song-cho	
Jon Chol-ho	weightlifter		
Kim Chol-jin	weightlifter	Disciple of Han Kyong-thae and coach of Kwon Yong-gwang	
Kim Hyon-hui	table tennis player		
Kim Kum-sil	female footballer	subsequently member of the Supreme People's Assembly	
Kim So-hyang	footballer	North Korea women's national under-20 football team player excelling at the 2016 FIFA U-20 Women's World Cup	
Ku Yong-jo	boxer	Competed in the bantamweight (54 kg) category.	
Mun Gyong-ae	marathoner	awarded for outstanding performances	
North Korea 1966 FIFA World Cup squad players	footballers	Almost all players of the squad were awarded the title.	
Pak Chong-jong	basketball player		
Pak Kwang-bok	gymnastics coach	Rhythmic gymnastics coach of the Kigwancha Sports Club	
Pak Sun-nyo	tumbling coach	Coach of Ri Chol-jun, Kim Un-hak, and other gymnasts	
Ri Byong-uk	boxer	Competed in the light flyweight (48 kg) category.	
Ri Hyang-sim	female footballer	coached by Kim Kyong-hui	
Ri Myong-hwa	female judoka	coached by Ri Song-cho	
Ri Se-gwang	artistic gymnast	National champion in floor, rings and vaulting horse, and gold medalist at the 2006 Asian Games and 2008 World Cup in gymnastics	
Ri Ye-gyong	female footballer	coached by Kim Kyong-hui	

== See also ==
- Orders, decorations, and medals of North Korea
- Sport in North Korea
- The Game of Their Lives (2002 film)
