= Myung Rye-hyun =

North Korean footballer (born 1926)

Personal information
- Full name: Myung Rye-hyun
- Date of birth: 14 April 1926
- Place of birth: Korea, Empire of Japan

Managerial career
- Years: Team
- 1960–1966: North Korea

- Myung Rye-hyun
- Hangul: 명례현
- RR: Myeong Ryehyeon
- MR: Myŏng Ryehyŏn

Myung Rye-hyun (Korean: 명례현; born 14 April 1926) was a North Korean football player and manager.

Myung was the head coach of the North Korea national team in the 1966 FIFA World Cup, when they became the first Asian team to reach the second round of the FIFA World Cup.
