= The Game of Their Lives (2002 film) =

2002 documentary film

- Film poster
- Hangul: 천리마 축구단
- Hanja: 千里馬蹴球團
- RR: Cheollima chukgudan
- MR: Ch'ŏllima ch'ukkudan
- Directed by: Daniel Gordon
- Written by: Daniel Gordon
- Produced by: Daniel Gordon (principal); Nicholas Bonner (associate producer); John Battsek (executive producer)
- Edited by: Justine Wright
- Production companies: Passion Pictures; VeryMuchSo Productions
- Distributed by: BBC (UK)
- Release date: 21 October 2002 (United Kingdom)
- Running time: 80 minutes
- Language: English

The Game of Their Lives (Korean: 천리마 축구단; lit. 'Chollima Football Team') is a 2002 documentary film directed and produced by Daniel Gordon, with Nicholas Bonner of Koryo Tours as an associate producer. It is about the seven surviving members of the North Korea national football team who participated in the 1966 FIFA World Cup. Their victory over Italy propelled the North Korean team into the quarter-final: it was the first time an Asian team had advanced so far in a World Cup.

== Production ==
Director Daniel Gordon and associate producer Nicholas Bonner were the first Westerners permitted by the North Korean government to interview the surviving members of the North Korean 1966 FIFA World Cup team. Nicholas Bonner is the founder of Koryo Tours, which produced the film.

Gordon and Bonner had the idea to make a film about the North Korea national football team in 1997. They were initially unsure if it was possible, owing to conspiracy theories that the team had been executed in North Korea after losing to Portugal. They were allowed by North Korean authorities to create the film, but funding for the documentary was suddenly pulled, so they raised money from friends and family. Access to Pyongyang was granted in October 2001. The BBC provided funding for post-production.

== Release ==
The film premiered at the Sheffield documentary film festival. Following the documentary's release, the seven members of the team visited England. They arrived in London in 2013, and were invited to the Houses of Parliament. They also made an appearance on the Goodison Park pitch and the flag of North Korea flew at the Middlesbrough town hall to greet them.

The film toured in several American cities. The documentary has previously aired on BBC Four.

== Awards and nominations ==
- 2003: Winner, the Royal Television Society award for best sports documentary
- 2003: Nominated for Best Historical Documentary at the Grierson Awards
- 2003: Nominated for Best Documentary at the British Independent Film Awards
- 2003: First prize, Seville Film Festival
- 2004: Refracting Reality Documentary Film Award, Seattle International Film Festival, tied with Searching for the Wrong-Eyed Jesus (2003)

== See also ==
- A State of Mind
- Dennis Rodman's Big Bang in Pyongyang
- List of association football films
