= Pak Doo-ik =

North Korean footballer (born 1936)

- Pak with North Korea in 1966

Personal information
- Date of birth: 17 December 1936 (age 89)
- Place of birth: Pyongyang, Korea, Empire of Japan (now Pyongyang, North Korea)
- Height: 1.71 m (5 ft 7 in)
- Position: Striker

International career^{‡}
| Years | Team | Apps | (Gls) |
| 1966 | North Korea | 5 | (2) |

Managerial career
- 1976–1977: North Korea
- 1986–1989: North Korea
- ‡ National team caps and goals as of January 1, 2003

- Pak Doo-ik
- Hangul: 박두익
- Hanja: 朴斗翼
- RR: Bak Duik
- MR: Pak Tuik

Pak Doo-ik (Chosungul: 박두익; Hanja: 朴斗翼; born 17 December 1936) is a North Korean former footballer who played as a forward. He scored the goal which knocked out Italy from the group stage of the 1966 FIFA World Cup.

== Career ==
Pak Doo-ik was born in Pyongyang. He represented North Korea at the 1966 FIFA World Cup in England, scoring the winning goal in their 1–0 win over Italy at Ayresome Park, Middlesbrough, a game since documented in the film The Game of Their Lives by British filmmaker Daniel Gordon. The result is still considered one of the World Cup's biggest ever upsets, with Italy – holders of a then joint-record two world titles – having been widely expected to face no difficulty in comfortably beating North Korea, who were making their tournament debut. Drawn in a group with Italy, Chile and the USSR, the North Koreans were based in the north-eastern English industrial town of Middlesbrough during the tournament, playing their matches at Ayresome Park stadium. After a 0–3 defeat against the USSR, their courageous and spirited display in an exciting 1–1 draw against Chile won the hearts of the local people. Their surprising win against the powerful Italians further cemented their popularity in the town. Pak, speaking in 2002 on a return to Middlesbrough with the surviving members of the 1966 North Korea team, recalled that "It was the day I learnt football is not all about winning. I learnt that playing football can improve diplomatic relations and promote peace."

After the victory, Pak, who was, at the time, a corporal in the North Korean army, was promoted to sergeant. An original ticket to the match is on display among other historical football items at the FIFA World Football Museum in Zurich. Although the North Koreans – having led 3–0 – eventually lost 3–5 to Portugal in their quarter-final match played at Goodison Park stadium in Liverpool, they did so cheered on by 3,000 fans from Middlesbrough who had made the coast-to-coast journey of 150 miles to support them. Pak and his teammates had made their mark on a town and a region, and written their names into World Cup folklore.

After the championship, Pak left the military and retired from football and became a gymnastics instructor. An Italian urban legend that persisted for a long time in the press had it that Pak was a dentist, although this was not the case. Some Korean defectors stated that he was punished at first by being compelled to work as a forest laborer for a decade before being rehabilitated.

Ayresome Park stadium was demolished in 1997 and a housing estate built on the site. In honour of the famous goal, in the front garden of one new house were permanently placed cast-iron football boot stud marks in the earth, at the exact position of Pak Doo-ik's feet when he scored against Italy with his shot from the edge of the penalty area. During the 2008 Olympic torch relay in Pyongyang, he was the first to carry the Olympic torch.

== International goals ==
Scores and results list North Korea's goal tally first.

| No | Date | Venue | Opponent | Score | Result | Competition |
|---|---|---|---|---|---|---|
| 1. | 21 November 1965 | Olympic Stadium, Phnom Penh, Cambodia | Australia | 1–0 | 6–1 | 1966 FIFA World Cup qualification |
| 2. | 19 July 1966 | Ayresome Park, Middlesbrough, England | Italy | 1–0 | 1–0 | 1966 FIFA World Cup |
