= 1966 FIFA World Cup =

Association football tournament in England

World Championship Jules Rimet Cup England 1966

Tournament details
- Host country: England
- Dates: 11–30 July
- Teams: 16 (from 4 confederations)
- Venues: 8 (in 7 host cities)

Final positions
- Champions: England (1st title)
- Runners-up: West Germany
- Third place: Portugal
- Fourth place: Soviet Union

Tournament statistics
- Matches played: 32
- Goals scored: 89 (2.78 per match)
- Attendance: 1,563,135 (48,848 per match)
- Top scorer: (Portugal) Eusébio (9 goals)

The 1966 FIFA World Cup was the eighth FIFA World Cup, the quadrennial football tournament for senior national teams. It was played in England from 11 to 30 July 1966. England defeated West Germany 4–2 in the final to win their first and only World Cup title. The final was level at 2–2 after 90 minutes and went into extra time, during which Geoff Hurst scored two goals to complete his hat-trick, the first to be scored in a World Cup final. Portuguese striker Eusébio was the tournament's top scorer with nine goals, earning him the golden boot award with three goals more than second placed Helmut Haller. It was the first World Cup held in the English-speaking world.

England were the fifth nation to win the event, and the third host nation to win after Uruguay in 1930 and Italy in 1934. Reigning world champions Brazil failed to get past the group stages as they were defeated by Hungary and Portugal. It was the second time that defending champions were eliminated in the group stages after Italy in 1950. This would not occur again until 36 years later. The two debut teams performed well at the competition – North Korea beat Italy 1–0 on the way to reaching the quarter-finals, where they lost to Portugal 5–3 after leading 3–0. Portugal themselves finished third, beating the Soviet Union 2–1 in the bronze-match.

During the qualifying games, FIFA, citing logistic and competitive reasons, announced that there would be no direct qualifying place for an African team: all 15 African nations who had entered immediately boycotted the competition in protest.

Matches were played at eight stadiums across England, foremost Wembley Stadium, which had a capacity of 98,600. It was at Wembley that England played all its matches; that the tournament was opened by Queen Elizabeth II; and where the final was played.

Prior to the tournament, the Jules Rimet trophy was stolen, but was recovered by a dog named Pickles four months before the tournament began. It was the first World Cup to have selected matches broadcast via satellite to countries on other continents. The final, which was broadcast locally by the BBC, was the last to be shown entirely in black and white. This was also the only World Cup in history that did not have matches on Sundays, owing to religious laws at the time, which were repealed ten years later in 1976.

== Background ==
In Rome, Italy on 22 August 1960, England was chosen as host nation for the 1966 World Cup over rival bids from West Germany and Spain. It was the first tournament to be held in a country that was affected directly by World War II, as the four previous tournaments were held either in countries out of war theatres or in neutral countries.

=== Qualification ===
Despite the Africans' absence, there was another new record number of entries for the qualifying tournament, with 70 nations taking part. FIFA determined that ten teams from Europe would qualify, along with four from South America, one from Asia and one from North and Central America.

Portugal and North Korea qualified for the first time.

=== Qualified teams ===
The following 16 teams qualified for the final tournament.

AFC (1)

- North Korea (debut)

CAF (0)

- None participated

OFC (0)

- None qualified

CONCACAF (1)

- Mexico

CONMEBOL (4)

- Argentina
- Brazil (holders)
- Chile
- Uruguay

UEFA (10)

- Bulgaria
- England (hosts)
- France
- Hungary
- Italy
- Portugal (debut)
- Soviet Union
- Spain
- Switzerland
- West Germany
Qualification for 1966 FIFA World Cup

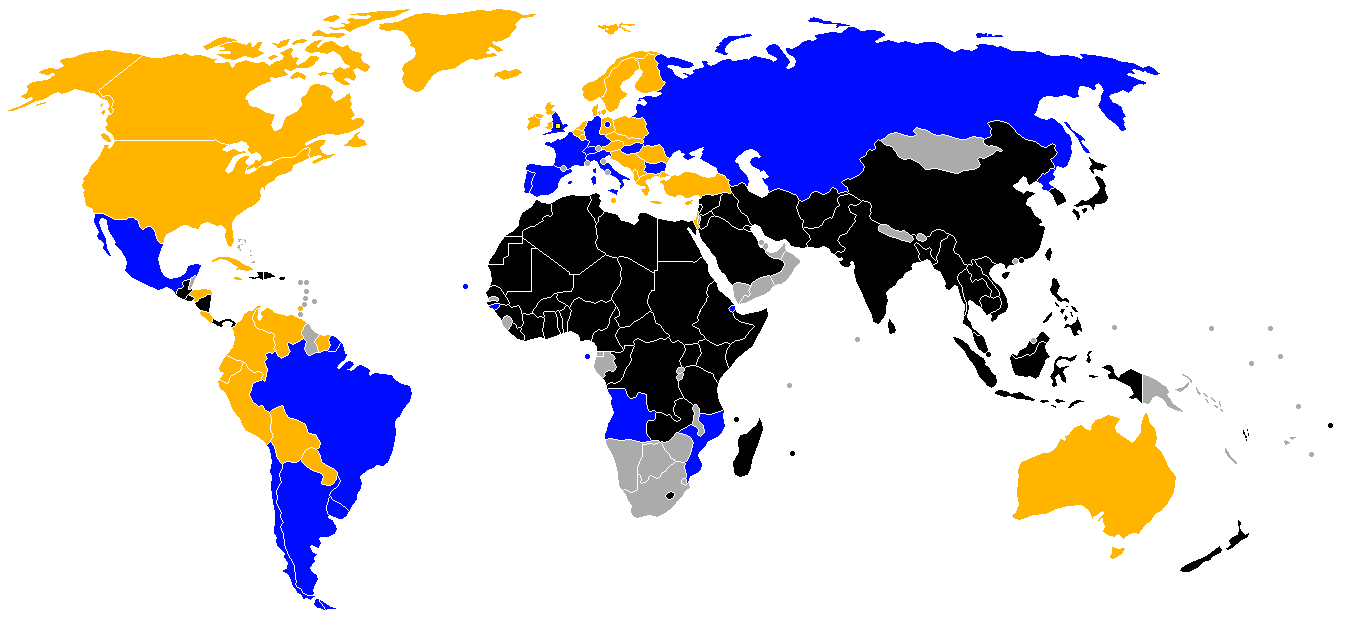
FIFA members qualified for World Cup (including colonies)
FIFA members that failed to qualify
FIFA members that did not enter World Cup
Countries not members of FIFA in 1966

=== Mascot and match ball ===
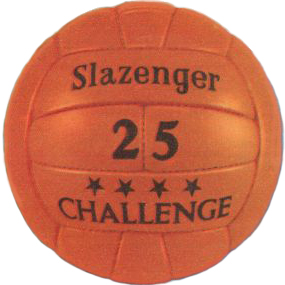
Official match ball for the 1966 FIFA World Cup produced by Slazenger

The mascot for the 1966 competition was "World Cup Willie", a cartoon lion wearing a Union Jack jersey emblazoned with the words "WORLD CUP". This was the first World Cup mascot, and one of the first mascots to be associated with a major sporting competition. Willie was designed by freelance children's book illustrator Reg Hoye. The official match ball was produced by Slazenger for the tournament.

=== Controversies ===
==== African boycott ====
All fifteen entered African nations boycotted the tournament to protest against a 1964 FIFA ruling that required the three second-round winners from the African zone to enter a play-off round against the winners of the Asian zone in order to qualify for the World Cup: they considered winning their zone was enough in itself to merit qualification.

The Confederation of African Football (CAF) considered that the lack of direct representation of African nations in the World Cup was unfair, and demanded that FIFA guarantee at least one African nation a place in the finals of the following tournament. They also protested against the readmission of South Africa to FIFA in 1963, despite their expulsion from CAF because of the country's apartheid regime in 1958.

As a result of this boycott, FIFA fined CAF 5,000 Swiss francs. Yidnekatchew Tessema, then president of the CAF, responded to this punishment by saying, "FIFA has adopted a relentless attitude against the African Associations and its decisions resemble methods of intimidation and repression designed to discourage any further impulses of a similar nature. In our opinion, the African National Associations ... really deserved a gesture of respect rather than a fine."

South Africa was subsequently assigned to the Asia and Oceania qualifying group, before being disqualified after being suspended again due to pressure from other African nations in October 1964. Despite this, FIFA refused to change the qualifying format, citing competitive and logistical issues, and the African teams withdrew in protest.

CAF subsequently informed FIFA that they would refuse to participate in World Cup qualifying for the 1970 tournament unless at least one African team had an automatic place assured in the World Cup: this was put in place for the 1970 FIFA World Cup, and all subsequent World Cup finals. Players from the Portuguese African colonies of Angola and Mozambique participated for Portugal.

==== North Korea–United Kingdom relations ====
The United Kingdom, which had fought for South Korea in the Korean War, was concerned over the entry of North Korea in the tournament. The UK did not recognise North Korea and feared that its presence would strain relations with South Korea and the United States. FIFA told England's Football Association that the tournament would be moved if any qualified team were to be refused entry.

On the suggestion of the British Foreign Office, the playing of national anthems, and meetings between players and state figures such as Queen Elizabeth II, would take place in only two games: the opening game and the final. North Korea was not scheduled for the former, and was considered unlikely to reach the latter. A Foreign Office suggestion for flags outside stadiums to be removed after each team's elimination, in the expectation of an early North Korean exit, was vetoed by the Department of Education and Science.

==== Trophy incident ====
The 1966 World Cup had a rather unusual hero off the field, a dog called Pickles. In the build-up to the tournament, the Jules Rimet trophy was stolen from an exhibition display. A nationwide hunt for the icon ensued. It was discovered wrapped in newspaper as the dog sniffed under bushes in a London garden. The FA commissioned a replica cup in case the original cup was not found in time. This replica, as well as Pickles' collar, is held at the National Football Museum in Manchester, where it is on display.

==== Doping ====
West Germany encouraged and covered up a culture of doping across many sports for decades. A 2013 report by researchers at Berlin's Humboldt University on behalf of the German Olympic Sports Confederation, titled "Doping in Germany from 1950 to today", linked the West Germany national team of 1966, which reached the World Cup final, with doping.

==== Officiating issues and subsequent reforms ====
While refereeing controversies are common in World Cup history, the 1966 tournament stands out because of the structural reforms it provoked. A series of violent matches and contentious dismissals led FIFA to introduce major changes to the Laws of the Game in the following tournament.

The tournament was marked by persistently rough play and inconsistent officiating. In their opening match, Brazilian star Pelé was repeatedly fouled and left the pitch injured after a strong tackle to the knee, forcing him to miss the subsequent match against Hungary. Upon returning for the final group stage clash with Portugal, Pelé suffered two heavy challenges from Portuguese defenders, most notably João Morais, that ended his tournament. Pelé departed on a stretcher, and Brazil exited the competition 3–1. Morais was allowed to remain on the pitch. No players were sent off in any of those games.

Further tension unfolded in the quarter-final between England and Argentina, when captain Antonio Rattín was controversially sent off by referee Rudolf Kreitlein for alleged "violence of the tongue." Rattín's refusal to immediately exit the field prompted a delay and police intervention, fuelling accusations of arbitrary officiating. In another quarter-final between West Germany and Uruguay, shortly after halftime, Uruguayan players Horacio Troche and Héctor Silva were both dismissed by English referee Jim Finney. Uruguay conceded 3 goals when reduced to nine men and South American media decried a pattern of European referee bias.

In light of these high-profile incidents, FIFA recognised the need for clearer disciplinary procedures and greater consistency in officiating. Ahead of the 1970 World Cup, the yellow and red card system was introduced, alongside the allowance of two substitutions per team and new efforts to standardise referee training and interpretations of the Laws of the Game.

==== Later accusations of matchfixing ====
In 2008, Brazilian FIFA president from 1974 until 1998, João Havelange, accused this competition, along with the 1974 FIFA World Cup in West Germany for being fixed to benefit the host country. According to him Brazil deserved to win in both cases.

== Format ==
The format of the 1966 competition remained the same as in 1962: 16 qualified teams were divided into four groups of four. Each group played a round-robin format. Two points were awarded for a win and one point for a draw, with goal average and eventually drawing lots used to separate teams equal on points. The top two teams in each group advanced to the knockout stage.

In the knockout games, if the teams were tied after 90 minutes, 30 minutes of extra time were played. For any match other than the final, if the teams were still tied after extra time, lots would be drawn to determine the winner. The final would have been replayed if tied after extra time; but if still tied after the replay, the champion would have been decided by drawing lots. In the event, no replays or drawing of lots were necessary.

The draw for the final tournament took place on 6 January 1966 at the Royal Garden Hotel in London, and was the first to be televised. The seeded teams for the draw were England, West Germany, Brazil, and Italy.

== Venues ==
Eight venues were used for this World Cup. The newest and biggest venue used was Wembley Stadium in north west London, which was 43 years old in 1966. As was often the case in the World Cup, group matches were played in two venues close to each other. Group 1 matches (which included the hosts) were all played in London: five at Wembley, which was England's national stadium and was considered to be the most important football venue in the world; and one at White City Stadium in west London, which was used as a temporary replacement for nearby Wembley. The group stage match between Uruguay and France played at White City Stadium (originally built for the 1908 Summer Olympics) was scheduled for a Friday, the same day as regularly scheduled greyhound racing at Wembley. Because Wembley's owner refused to cancel this, the game had to be moved to the alternative venue in London. Group 2's matches were played at Hillsborough Stadium in Sheffield and Villa Park in Birmingham; Group 3's matches were played at Old Trafford in Manchester and Goodison Park in Liverpool; and Group 4's matches were played at Ayresome Park in Middlesbrough and Roker Park in Sunderland. The stadium construction cost are estimated to be today's equivalent of £9.2 million, additional to £36.22 million for tournament organisation.

The most used venue was Wembley, which was used for nine matches, including all six featuring England, the final and the match for third place. Goodison Park was used for five matches, Roker Park and Hillsborough both hosted four, while Old Trafford, Villa Park and Ayresome Park each hosted three matches and did not host any knockout round matches.

London	1966 FIFA World Cup is located in Greater London	London
Wembley Stadium	1966 FIFA World Cup is located in Greater London	White City Stadium
Capacity: 98,600	1966 FIFA World Cup is located in Greater London	Capacity: 76,567
Manchester	1966 FIFA World Cup is located in Greater London	Birmingham
Old Trafford	1966 FIFA World Cup is located in Greater London	Villa Park
Capacity: 58,000	1966 FIFA World Cup is located in England	Capacity: 52,000
Liverpool	1966 FIFA World Cup is located in England	Sheffield
Goodison Park	1966 FIFA World Cup is located in England	Hillsborough Stadium
Capacity: 50,151	1966 FIFA World Cup is located in England	Capacity: 42,730
Sunderland	1966 FIFA World Cup is located in England	Middlesbrough
Roker Park	1966 FIFA World Cup is located in England	Ayresome Park
Capacity: 40,310	1966 FIFA World Cup is located in England	Capacity: 40,000

== Tournament summary ==
The opening match took place on Monday, 11 July, which made it the second World Cup after 1930 not to begin in May or June. Before the tournament began, eventual winners England were 9/2 second favourites with bookmakers behind Brazil (9/4), while beaten finalists West Germany were 25/1 outsiders. The final took place on Saturday, 30 July 1966, the 36th anniversary of the first final. Until 2022, this was the latest date that any tournament had concluded. The reason for the unusually late scheduling of the tournament appears to lie with the outside broadcast commitments of the BBC, which also had to cover the Wimbledon tennis tournament (which ran between 20 June and 2 July) and the Open Golf Championship (6 to 9 July).

=== Group stage ===
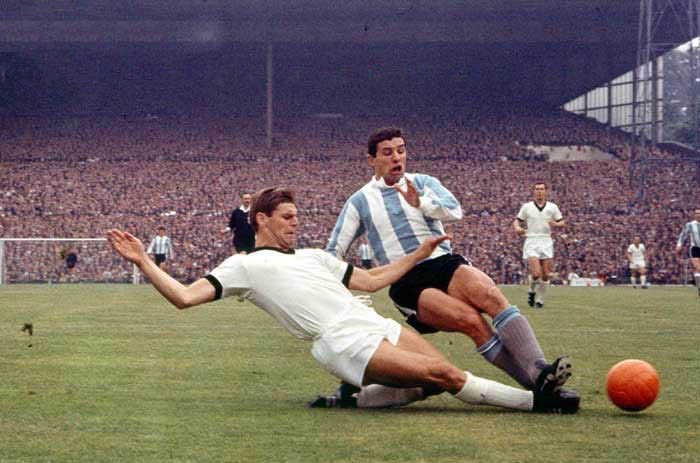
Wolfgang Weber (left) and Luis Artime during the match between West Germany and Argentina in Birmingham

1966 was a World Cup with few goals as the teams began to play much more tactically and defensively. This was exemplified by Alf Ramsey's England as they finished top of Group 1 with only four goals, but having none scored against them. They also became the first World Cup winning team not to win its first game in the tournament. Uruguay were the other team to qualify from that group at the expense of both Mexico and France. All the group's matches were played at Wembley Stadium apart from the match between Uruguay and France which took place at White City Stadium.

In Group 2, West Germany and Argentina qualified with ease as they each finished the group with 5 points, Spain managed 2, while Switzerland left the competition after losing all three group matches. FIFA cautioned Argentina for its violent style in the group games, particularly in the scoreless draw with West Germany, which saw Argentinean Rafael Albrecht get sent off and suspended for the next match.

In the northwest of England, Old Trafford and Goodison Park played host to Group 3 which saw the two-time defending champions Brazil finish in third place behind Portugal and Hungary, and be eliminated along with Bulgaria. Brazil were defeated 3–1 by Hungary in a classic encounter before falling by the same scoreline to Portugal in a controversial game. Portugal appeared in the finals for the first time, and made quite an impact. They won all three of their games in the group stage, with a lot of help from their outstanding striker Eusébio, whose nine goals made him the tournament's top scorer.

Group 4, however, provided the biggest upset when North Korea beat Italy 1–0 at Ayresome Park, Middlesbrough and finished above them, thus earning qualification to the next round along with the Soviet Union. This was the first time that a nation from outside Europe or the Americas had progressed from the first stage of a World Cup: the next would be Morocco in 1986.

=== Knock-out stages ===
The quarter-finals provided a controversial victory for West Germany as they cruised past Uruguay 4–0; the South Americans claimed that this occurred only after the referee (who was Jim Finney from England) had not recognised a handball by Schnellinger on the goal line and then had sent off two players from Uruguay: Horacio Troche and Héctor Silva. It appeared as if the surprise package North Korea would claim another major upset in their match against Portugal at Goodison Park: they led 3–0 after 22 minutes. It fell to one of the greatest stars of the tournament, Eusébio, to change that. He scored four goals in the game and José Augusto added a fifth goal in the 78th minute to earn Portugal a 5–3 victory.

Meanwhile, in the other two games, Ferenc Bene's late goal for Hungary against the Soviet Union, who were led by Lev Yashin's stellar goalkeeping, proved little more than a consolation as they crashed out 2–1, and the only goal between Argentina and England came courtesy of England's Geoff Hurst. During that controversial game (for more details see Argentina and England football rivalry), Argentina's Antonio Rattín became the first player to be sent off in a senior international football match at Wembley. Rattín at first refused to leave the field and eventually had to be escorted by several policemen. Scoreless when Rattin was dismissed, the game was decided by Hurst's headed goal twelve minutes from the end of normal time. This game is called el robo del siglo (lit. 'the robbery of the century') in Argentina.

All semi-finalists were from Europe. Bobby Charlton scored both goals in England's win, with Portugal's goal coming from a penalty in the 82nd minute after a handball by Jack Charlton on the goal line. The other semi-final also finished 2–1: Franz Beckenbauer scoring the winning goal with a left foot shot from the edge of the area for West Germany as they beat the Soviet Union.

Portugal went on to beat the Soviet Union 2–1 to take third place. Portugal's third place was the best finish by a team making its World Cup debut since 1934. It was equalled by Croatia in 1998.

=== Final ===
London's Wembley Stadium was the venue for the final, and 98,000 people attended. After 12 minutes 32 seconds Helmut Haller put West Germany ahead, but the score was levelled by Geoff Hurst four minutes later. Martin Peters put England in the lead in the 78th minute; England looked set to claim the title when the referee awarded a free kick to West Germany with one minute left. The ball was launched goalward and Wolfgang Weber scored, with England appealing in vain for handball as the ball came through the crowded penalty area.

With the score level at 2–2 at the end of 90 minutes, the game went to extra time. In the 98th minute, Hurst found himself on the scoresheet again; his shot hit the crossbar, bounced down onto the goal line, and was awarded as a goal. Debate has long raged over whether the ball crossed the line, with the goal becoming part of World Cup history. England's final goal was scored by Hurst again, as a celebratory pitch invasion began. This made Geoff Hurst the first player to have scored three times in a single World Cup final. BBC commentator Kenneth Wolstenholme's description of the match's closing moments has gone down in history: "Some people are on the pitch. They think it's all over ... [Hurst scores] It is now!"

England's total of eleven goals scored in six games set a new record low for average goals per game scored by a World Cup winning team. The record stood until 1982, when it was surpassed by Italy's 12 goals in seven games; in 2010 this record was lowered again by Spain, winning the Cup with eight goals in seven games. England's total of three goals conceded also constituted a record low for average goals per game conceded by a World Cup winning team. That record stood until 1994, when it was surpassed by Brazil's three goals in seven games. France again lowered the record to two goals in seven during the 1998 tournament, a record that has since been equalled by Italy at the 2006 tournament and by Spain's two goals conceded during the 2010 tournament. Spain then lowered the record to one in eight in 2026.

England received the recovered Jules Rimet trophy from Queen Elizabeth II and were crowned World Cup winners for the first time.

In this World Cup, the national anthems were played only in the final. They were not played in the earlier matches because the organisers (FIFA and the FA) feared that North Korea's presence – a socialist country that was not recognised by the United Kingdom – in the World Cup would cause problems with South Korea. A memo from the Foreign Office months before the finals began stated that the solution would be "denying the visas to North Korean players". The final, held at Wembley Stadium, was the last whose television broadcast was in black and white.

== Match officials ==
A total of 26 match referees and other officials featured at the event. Despite the event being a worldwide tournament, the majority of the officials were from Europe. Gottfried Dienst refereed the final between England and West Germany.

Africa

- (Egypt) Ali Kandil

Asia

- (Israel) Menachem Ashkenazi

South America

- (Uruguay) José María Codesal
- (Argentina) Roberto Goicoechea
- (Brazil) Armando Marques
- (Peru) Arturo Yamasaki

Europe

- (Northern Ireland) John Adair
- (Soviet Union) Tofiq Bahramov
- (Wales) Leo Callaghan
- (Portugal) Joaquim Campos
- (England) Ken Dagnall
- (Switzerland) Gottfried Dienst
- (England) Jim Finney
- (Czechoslovakia) Karol Galba
- (Spain) Juan Gardeazábal Garay
- (West Germany) Rudolf Kreitlein
- (Italy) Concetto Lo Bello
- (Sweden) Bertil Lööw
- (England) George McCabe
- (Scotland) Hugh Phillips
- (Bulgaria) Dimitar Rumentchev
- (France) Pierre Schwinte
- (West Germany) Kurt Tschenscher
- (Socialist Federal Republic of Yugoslavia) Konstantin Zečević
- (Hungarian People's Republic) István Zsolt

== Draw ==
Pot 1: South American	Pot 2: European	Pot 3: Latin European	Pot 4: Rest of the World
Brazil (1962 champions, seeded, Group 3); Argentina; Chile; Uruguay	England (hosts, seeded, Group 1); Hungary; Soviet Union; West Germany (seeded)	France; Portugal; Spain; Italy (seeded)	Bulgaria; North Korea; Mexico; Switzerland

== Group stage ==
=== Group 1 ===
Pos	Team	Pld	W	D	L	GF	GA	GR	Pts	Qualification
1	England	3	2	1	0	4	0	—	5	Advance to knockout stage
2	Uruguay	3	1	2	0	2	1	2.000	4	Advance to knockout stage
3	Mexico	3	0	2	1	1	3	0.333	2	
4	France	3	0	1	2	2	5	0.400	1	

Source: FIFA
11 July 1966
19:30 BST

England	0–0	Uruguay

Wembley Stadium, London
Attendance: 87,148
Referee: Istvan Zsolt (Hungary)
13 July 1966
19:30 BST

France	1–1	Mexico
Hausser 62'		Borja 48'

Wembley Stadium, London
Attendance: 69,237
Referee: Menachem Ashkenazi (Israel)

15 July 1966
19:30 BST

Uruguay	2–1	France
Rocha 26'; Cortés 31'		De Bourgoing 15' (pen.)

White City Stadium, London
Attendance: 45,662
Referee: Karol Galba (Czechoslovakia)
16 July 1966
19:30 BST

England	2–0	Mexico
B. Charlton 37'; Hunt 75'

Wembley Stadium, London
Attendance: 92,570
Referee: Concetto Lo Bello (Italy)

19 July 1966
16:30 BST

Mexico	0–0	Uruguay

Wembley Stadium, London
Attendance: 61,112
Referee: Bertil Lööw (Sweden)
20 July 1966
19:30 BST

England	2–0	France
Hunt 38', 75'

Wembley Stadium, London
Attendance: 98,270
Referee: Arturo Yamasaki (Peru)

=== Group 2 ===
Pos	Team	Pld	W	D	L	GF	GA	GR	Pts	Qualification
1	West Germany	3	2	1	0	7	1	7.000	5 (Note: West Germany finished ahead of Argentina on goal average.)	Advance to knockout stage
2	Argentina	3	2	1	0	4	1	4.000	5	Advance to knockout stage
3	Spain	3	1	0	2	4	5	0.800	2	
4	Switzerland	3	0	0	3	1	9	0.111	0	

Source: FIFA
Notes:
12 July 1966
19:30 BST

West Germany	5–0	Switzerland
Held 16'; Haller 21', 77' (pen.); Beckenbauer 40', 52'

Hillsborough Stadium, Sheffield
Attendance: 36,127
Referee: Hugh Phillips (Scotland)
13 July 1966
19:30 BST

Argentina	2–1	Spain
Artime 66', 79'		Pirri 72'

Villa Park, Birmingham
Attendance: 42,738
Referee: Dimitar Rumenchev (Bulgaria)

15 July 1966
19:30 BST

Spain	2–1	Switzerland
Sanchís 57'; Amancio 75'		Quentin 31'

Hillsborough Stadium, Sheffield
Attendance: 32,028
Referee: Tofiq Bahramov (Soviet Union)
16 July 1966
15:00 BST

Argentina	0–0	West Germany

Villa Park, Birmingham
Attendance: 46,587
Referee: Konstantin Zečević (Yugoslavia)

19 July 1966
19:30 BST

Argentina	2–0	Switzerland
Artime 52'; Onega 79'

Hillsborough Stadium, Sheffield
Attendance: 32,127
Referee: Joaquim Campos (Portugal)
20 July 1966
19:30 BST

West Germany	2–1	Spain
Emmerich 39'; Seeler 84'		Fusté 23'

Villa Park, Birmingham
Attendance: 42,187
Referee: Armando Marques (Brazil)

=== Group 3 ===
Pos	Team	Pld	W	D	L	GF	GA	GR	Pts	Qualification
1	Portugal	3	3	0	0	9	2	4.500	6	Advance to knockout stage
2	Hungary	3	2	0	1	7	5	1.400	4	Advance to knockout stage
3	Brazil	3	1	0	2	4	6	0.667	2	
4	Bulgaria	3	0	0	3	1	8	0.125	0	

Source: FIFA
12 July 1966
19:30 BST

Brazil	2–0	Bulgaria
Pelé 15'; Garrincha 63'

Goodison Park, Liverpool
Attendance: 47,308
Referee: Kurt Tschenscher (West Germany)
13 July 1966
19:30 BST

Portugal	3–1	Hungary
José Augusto 2', 67'; Torres 90'		Bene 60'

Old Trafford, Manchester
Attendance: 29,886
Referee: Leo Callaghan (Wales)

15 July 1966
19:30 BST

Hungary	3–1	Brazil
Bene 2'; Farkas 64'; Mészöly 73' (pen.)		Tostão 14'

Goodison Park, Liverpool
Attendance: 51,387
Referee: Ken Dagnall (England)
16 July 1966
15:00 BST

Portugal	3–0	Bulgaria
Vutsov 7' (o.g.); Eusébio 38'; Torres 81'

Old Trafford, Manchester
Attendance: 25,438
Referee: José María Codensal (Uruguay)

19 July 1966
19:30 BST

Portugal	3–1	Brazil
Simões 15'; Eusébio 27', 85'		Rildo 73'

Goodison Park, Liverpool
Attendance: 58,479
Referee: George McCabe (England)
20 July 1966
19:30 BST

Hungary	3–1	Bulgaria
Davidov 43' (o.g.) (Note: Also credited to Vutsov own goal.); Mészöly 45'; Bene 54'		Asparuhov 15'

Old Trafford, Manchester
Attendance: 24,129
Referee: Roberto Goicoechea (Argentina)

=== Group 4 ===
Pos	Team	Pld	W	D	L	GF	GA	GR	Pts	Qualification
1	Soviet Union	3	3	0	0	6	1	6.000	6	Advance to knockout stage
2	North Korea	3	1	1	1	2	4	0.500	3	Advance to knockout stage
3	Italy	3	1	0	2	2	2	1.000	2	
4	Chile	3	0	1	2	2	5	0.400	1	

Source: FIFA
12 July 1966
19:30 BST

Soviet Union	3–0	North Korea
Malofeyev 31', 88'; Banishevskiy 33'

Ayresome Park, Middlesbrough
Attendance: 23,006
Referee: Juan Gardeazábal Garay (Spain)
13 July 1966
19:30 BST

Italy	2–0	Chile
Mazzola 8'; Barison 88'

Roker Park, Sunderland
Attendance: 27,199
Referee: Gottfried Dienst (Switzerland)

15 July 1966
19:30 BST

Chile	1–1	North Korea
Marcos 26' (pen.)		Pak Seung-zin 88'

Ayresome Park, Middlesbrough
Attendance: 13,792
Referee: Ali Kandil (United Arab Republic)
16 July 1966
15:00 BST

Soviet Union	1–0	Italy
Chislenko 57'

Roker Park, Sunderland
Attendance: 27,793
Referee: Rudolf Kreitlein (West Germany)

19 July 1966
19:30 BST

North Korea	1–0	Italy
Pak Doo-ik 42'

Ayresome Park, Middlesbrough
Attendance: 17,829
Referee: Pierre Schwinte (France)
20 July 1966
19:30 BST

Soviet Union	2–1	Chile
Porkuyan 28', 85'		Marcos 32'

Roker Park, Sunderland
Attendance: 16,027
Referee: John Adair (Northern Ireland)

== Knockout stage ==
=== Bracket ===
Quarter-finals
23 July – London (Wembley)
England	1
Argentina	0
23 July – Liverpool
Portugal	5
North Korea	3
23 July – Sheffield (Hillsborough)
West Germany	4
Uruguay	0
23 July – Sunderland
Soviet Union	2
Hungary	1

Semi-finals
26 July – London (Wembley)
England	2
Portugal	1
25 July – Liverpool
West Germany	2
Soviet Union	1

Final
30 July – London (Wembley)
England (a.e.t.)	4
West Germany	2
Match for third place
28 July – London (Wembley)
Portugal	2
Soviet Union	1

=== Quarter-finals ===
23 July 1966
15:00 BST

England	1–0	Argentina
Hurst 78'

Wembley Stadium, London
Attendance: 90,584
Referee: Rudolf Kreitlein (West Germany)

23 July 1966
15:00 BST

West Germany	4–0	Uruguay
Haller 11', 83'; Beckenbauer 70'; Seeler 75'

Hillsborough Stadium, Sheffield
Attendance: 40,007
Referee: Jim Finney (England)

23 July 1966
15:00 BST

Soviet Union	2–1	Hungary
Chislenko 5'; Porkuyan 46'		Bene 57'

Roker Park, Sunderland
Attendance: 26,844
Referee: Juan Gardeazábal Garay (Spain)

23 July 1966
15:00 BST

Portugal	5–3	North Korea
Eusébio 27', 43' (pen.), 56', 59' (pen.); José Augusto 80'		Pak Seung-zin 1'; Li Dong-woon 22'; Yang Seung-kook 25'

Goodison Park, Liverpool
Attendance: 40,248
Referee: Menachem Ashkenazi (Israel)

=== Semi-finals ===
25 July 1966
19:30 BST

West Germany	2–1	Soviet Union
Haller 43'; Beckenbauer 67'		Porkuyan 88'

Goodison Park, Liverpool
Attendance: 38,273
Referee: Concetto Lo Bello (Italy)

26 July 1966
19:30 BST

England	2–1	Portugal
B. Charlton 30', 80'		Eusébio 82' (pen.)

Wembley Stadium, London
Attendance: 94,493
Referee: Pierre Schwinte (France)

=== Match for third place ===
28 July 1966
19:30 BST

Portugal	2–1	Soviet Union
Eusébio 12' (pen.); Torres 89'		Malofeyev 43' (Note: Goal also credited to Banishevskiy.)

Wembley Stadium, London
Attendance: 87,696
Referee: Ken Dagnall (England)

=== Final ===
30 July 1966
15:00 BST

England	4–2 (a.e.t.)	West Germany
Hurst 18', 101', 120'; Peters 78'		Haller 12'; Weber 89'

Wembley Stadium, London
Attendance: 96,924
Referee: Gottfried Dienst (Switzerland)

== Statistics ==
=== Goalscorers ===
With nine goals, Eusébio was the top scorer in the tournament. In total, 89 goals were scored by 47 players, with two of them credited as own goals.

9 goals

- (Portugal) Eusébio

6 goals

- (West Germany) Helmut Haller

4 goals

- (England) Geoff Hurst
- (Hungarian People's Republic) Ferenc Bene
- (Soviet Union) Valeriy Porkujan
- (West Germany) Franz Beckenbauer

3 goals

- (Argentina) Luis Artime
- (England) Bobby Charlton
- (England) Roger Hunt
- (Portugal) José Augusto
- (Portugal) José Torres
- (Soviet Union) Eduard Malofeyev

2 goals

- (Chile) Rubén Marcos
- (Hungarian People's Republic) Kálmán Mészöly
- (North Korea) Pak Seung-zin
- (Soviet Union) Igor Chislenko
- (West Germany) Uwe Seeler
- (Soviet Union) Anatoliy Banishevskiy

1 goal

- (Argentina) Ermindo Onega
- (Brazil) Garrincha
- (Brazil) Pelé
- (Brazil) Rildo
- (Brazil) Tostão
- (Bulgaria) Georgi Asparuhov
- (England) Martin Peters
- (France) Héctor De Bourgoing
- (France) Gérard Hausser
- (Hungarian People's Republic) János Farkas
- (Italy) Paolo Barison
- (Italy) Sandro Mazzola
- (Mexico) Enrique Borja
- (North Korea) Li Dong-woon
- (North Korea) Pak Doo-ik
- (North Korea) Yang Seung-kook
- (Portugal) António Simões
- (Spain) Amancio
- (Spain) Josep Maria Fusté
- (Spain) Pirri
- (Spain) Manuel Sanchís
- (Switzerland) René-Pierre Quentin
- (Uruguay) Julio César Cortés
- (Uruguay) Pedro Rocha
- (West Germany) Lothar Emmerich
- (West Germany) Sigfried Held
- (West Germany) Wolfgang Weber

1 own goal

- (Bulgaria) Ivan Davidov (against Hungary)
- (Bulgaria) Ivan Vutsov (against Portugal)

=== Team of the Tournament ===
FIFA selected the following players for the 1966 FIFA World Cup All-Star Team.

Goalkeeper	Defenders	Midfielders	Forwards
(England) Gordon Banks	(England) George Cohen (England) Bobby Moore (Portugal) Vicente (Argentina) Silvio Marzolini	(Germany) Franz Beckenbauer (Portugal) Mário Coluna (England) Bobby Charlton	(Hungary) Flórián Albert (Germany) Uwe Seeler (Portugal) Eusébio

=== Tournament ranking ===
Results of 1966 FIFA World Cup

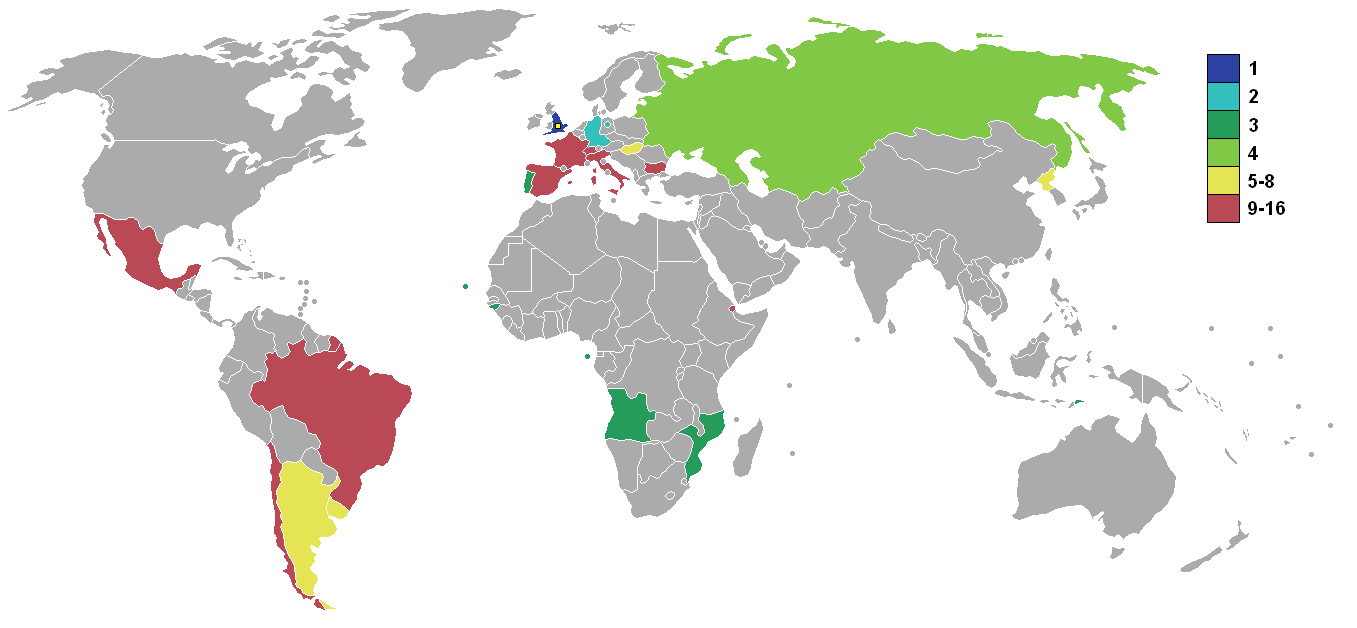
Champions Runners-up Third place Fourth place Quarter-finals Group stage

Angola and Mozambique represented Portugal.

In 1986, FIFA published a report that ranked all teams in each World Cup up to and including 1986, based on progress in the competition and overall results. The rankings for the 1966 tournament were as follows:

Per statistical convention in football, matches decided in extra time are counted as wins and losses.

Pos	Grp	Team	Pld	W	D	L	GF	GA	GD	Pts	Final result
1	1	England (H)	6	5	1	0	11	3	+8	11	Champions
2	2	West Germany	6	4	1	1	15	6	+9	9	Runners-up
3	3	Portugal	6	5	0	1	17	8	+9	10	Third place
4	4	Soviet Union	6	4	0	2	10	6	+4	8	Fourth place
5	2	Argentina	4	2	1	1	4	2	+2	5	Eliminated in quarter-finals
6	3	Hungary	4	2	0	2	8	7	+1	4	Eliminated in quarter-finals
7	1	Uruguay	4	1	2	1	2	5	−3	4	Eliminated in quarter-finals
8	4	North Korea	4	1	1	2	5	9	−4	3	Eliminated in quarter-finals
9	4	Italy	3	1	0	2	2	2	0	2	Eliminated in group stage
10	2	Spain	3	1	0	2	4	5	−1	2	Eliminated in group stage
11	3	Brazil	3	1	0	2	4	6	−2	2	Eliminated in group stage
12	1	Mexico	3	0	2	1	1	3	−2	2	Eliminated in group stage
=13	4	Chile	3	0	1	2	2	5	−3	1	Eliminated in group stage
=13	1	France	3	0	1	2	2	5	−3	1	Eliminated in group stage
15	3	Bulgaria	3	0	0	3	1	8	−7	0	Eliminated in group stage
16	2	Switzerland	3	0	0	3	1	9	−8	0	Eliminated in group stage

Source: FIFA
(H) Hosts

== Bibliography ==
- Hamilton, Duncan (2023). Answered Prayers: England and the 1966 World Cup. United Kingdom: Quercus Publishing. ISBN 9781529419986.
