= List of ambassadors of Switzerland to Turkey =

Coordinates: 39.898693°N 32.861128°E

Ambassador of Switzerland to Turkey
- Inaugural holder: Henri François Martin
- Formation: April 16, 1926

The Swiss ambassador in Ankara is the official representative of the Government in Bern to the Government of Turkey.

== List of representatives ==
| Diplomatic agrément/Diplomatic accreditation | Ambassador | Diplomatic Documents of Switzerland | Function | Observations | List of members of the Swiss Federal Council | Prime Minister of Turkey | Term end |
|---|---|---|---|---|---|---|---|
| April 16, 1926 | Henri François Martin | Henri François Martin in the Dodis database of the Diplomatic Documents of Switzerland | Envoy | | Heinrich Häberlin | Ali Fethi Bey | October 1, 1928 |
| October 16, 1928 | Henri François Martin | Henri François Martin in the Dodis database of the Diplomatic Documents of Switzerland | Envoy | | Edmund Schulthess | Ali Fethi Bey | October 31, 1937 |
| 1933 | Charles-Edouard de Bavier | Charles-Edouard de Bavier in the Dodis database of the Diplomatic Documents of Switzerland | | | Edmund Schulthess | Ali Fethi Bey | 1934 |
| October 9, 1934 | Emil Anton Bloesch | Emil Anton Bloesch in the Dodis database of the Diplomatic Documents of Switzerland | head | | Marcel Pilet-Golaz | Ali Fethi Bey | April 20, 1905 |
| October 16, 1934 | Emil Anton Bloesch | Emil Anton Bloesch in the Dodis database of the Diplomatic Documents of Switzerland | Chargé d'affaires | | Marcel Pilet-Golaz | Ali Fethi Bey | September 30, 1938 |
| October 16, 1934 | Emil Anton Bloesch | Emil Anton Bloesch in the Dodis database of the Diplomatic Documents of Switzerland | Secretary | | Marcel Pilet-Golaz | Ali Fethi Bey | September 30, 1938 |
| September 19, 1938 | Etienne Lardy | Etienne Lardy in the Dodis database of the Diplomatic Documents of Switzerland | Envoy | | Johannes Baumann | Celâl Bayar | May 12, 1946 |
| April 22, 1905 | Alfred Zehnder | Alfred Zehnder in the Dodis database of the Diplomatic Documents of Switzerland | Secretary | | Marc-Emile Ruchet | Murad V. | April 23, 1905 |
| January 1, 1941 | Friedrich Zuber | Friedrich Zuber in the Dodis database of the Diplomatic Documents of Switzerland | Legation Council | | Ernst Wetter | Refik Saydam | April 17, 1943 |
| January 14, 1941 | Friedrich Zuber | Friedrich Zuber in the Dodis database of the Diplomatic Documents of Switzerland | Secretary | | Ernst Wetter | Refik Saydam | December 31, 1941 |
| April 10, 1941 | Xavier de Meyer | Xavier de Meyer in the Dodis database of the Diplomatic Documents of Switzerland | Attaché | | Ernst Wetter | Refik Saydam | December 31, 1941 |
| 1942 | Robert Frick | Robert Frick in the Dodis database of the Diplomatic Documents of Switzerland | Military attaché | | Philipp Etter | Ahmet Fikri Tüzer | 1946 |
| January 1, 1942 | Xavier de Meyer | Xavier de Meyer in the Dodis database of the Diplomatic Documents of Switzerland | Secretary | | Philipp Etter | Ahmet Fikri Tüzer | June 6, 1943 |
| January 1, 1945 | Roger Dürr | Roger Dürr in the Dodis database of the Diplomatic Documents of Switzerland | Attaché | | Eduard von Steiger | Ahmet Fikri Tüzer | |
| January 1, 1946 | Daniel Gagnebin | Daniel Gagnebin in the Dodis database of the Diplomatic Documents of Switzerland | Attaché | | Karl Kobelt | Recep Peker | |
| January 1, 1946 | Oscar Rossetti | Oscar Rossetti in the Dodis database of the Diplomatic Documents of Switzerland | Secretary | | Karl Kobelt | Recep Peker | January 1, 1949 |
| January 1, 1946 | Camille Gorgé | Camille Gorgé in the Dodis database of the Diplomatic Documents of Switzerland | Envoy | | Karl Kobelt | Recep Peker | January 1, 1950 |
| January 1, 1946 | Charles Daniel (Swiss diplomat) | Charles Daniel in the Dodis database of the Diplomatic Documents of Switzerland | Military attaché | | Karl Kobelt | Recep Peker | January 1, 1948 |
| April 5, 1946 | Camille Gorgé | Camille Gorgé in the Dodis database of the Diplomatic Documents of Switzerland | Envoy | | Karl Kobelt | Recep Peker | January 1, 1950 |
| September 13, 1946 | Harald Feller | Harald Feller in the Dodis database of the Diplomatic Documents of Switzerland | Secretary | | Karl Kobelt | Recep Peker | April 25, 1949 |
| 1947 | Ferdinand Dufour | Ferdinand Dufour in the Dodis database of the Diplomatic Documents of Switzerland | Secretary | | Philipp Etter | Hasan Saka | |
| January 1, 1948 | Jean-Louis Berthoud | Jean-Louis Berthoud in the Dodis database of the Diplomatic Documents of Switzerland | Secretary | | Enrico Celio | Hasan Saka | January 15, 1949 |
| 1951 | Etienne Vallotton | Etienne Vallotton in the Dodis database of the Diplomatic Documents of Switzerland | Attaché | | Eduard von Steiger | Adnan Menderes | |
| February 2, 1951 | Julien Rossat | Julien Rossat in the Dodis database of the Diplomatic Documents of Switzerland | Envoy | | Eduard von Steiger | Adnan Menderes | April 5, 1957 |
| December 16, 1954 | Hans Conrad Cramer | Hans Conrad Cramer in the Dodis database of the Diplomatic Documents of Switzerland | Secretary | | Rodolphe Rubattel | Adnan Menderes | May 10, 1905 |
| April 26, 1957 | Eric Kessler | Eric Kessler in the Dodis database of the Diplomatic Documents of Switzerland | Ambassador | | Hans Streuli | Adnan Menderes | May 15, 1905 |
| September 26, 1962 | René Keller (Swiss diplomat) | René Keller in the Dodis database of the Diplomatic Documents of Switzerland | Ambassador | | Paul Chaudet | İsmet İnönü | December 23, 1965 |
| 1964 | François Pictet | François Pictet in the Dodis database of the Diplomatic Documents of Switzerland | Secretary | | Marc-Emile Ruchet | Murad V. | April 1, 1966 |
| 1965 | Carl Weidenmann | Carl Weidenmann in the Dodis database of the Diplomatic Documents of Switzerland | Military attaché | | Hans-Peter Tschudi | Suad Hayri Ürgüplü | |
| May 19, 1966 | Arturo Marcionelli | Arturo Marcionelli in the Dodis database of the Diplomatic Documents of Switzerland | Ambassador | | Hans Schaffner | Suad Hayri Ürgüplü | December 13, 1972 |
| 1967 | Hikmet Belbez | Hikmet Belbez in the Dodis database of the Diplomatic Documents of Switzerland | Legal adviser | | Roger Bonvin | Suad Hayri Ürgüplü | |
| 1968 | Dieter Chenaux-Repond | Dieter Chenaux-Repond in the Dodis database of the Diplomatic Documents of Switzerland | II. Secretary | | Willy Spühler | Suad Hayri Ürgüplü | |
| 1969 | Antoine Jean Guisolan | Antoine Jean Guisolan in the Dodis database of the Diplomatic Documents of Switzerland | Military attaché | | Ludwig von Moos | Suad Hayri Ürgüplü | 1969 |
| 1971 | Paul Friedrich Stauffer | Paul Friedrich Stauffer in the Dodis database of the Diplomatic Documents of Switzerland | Secretary | | Rudolf Gnägi | Nihat Erim | |
| 1972 | Urs Peter Ramser | Urs Peter Ramser in the Dodis database of the Diplomatic Documents of Switzerland | Military attaché | | Nello Celio | Ferit Melen | 1972 |
| 1973 | Adolf Knöpfel | Adolf Knöpfel in the Dodis database of the Diplomatic Documents of Switzerland | Vice Consul | | Roger Bonvin | Mehmet Naim Talu | |
| 1973 | Adolf Knöpfel | Adolf Knöpfel in the Dodis database of the Diplomatic Documents of Switzerland | Office of the Chancellor | | Roger Bonvin | Mehmet Naim Talu | |
| March 19, 1973 | Jean-Denis Grandjean | Jean-Denis Grandjean in the Dodis database of the Diplomatic Documents of Switzerland | Ambassador | | Roger Bonvin | Mehmet Naim Talu | December 6, 1974 |
| 1974 | Johann Heinrich Ghisler | Johann Heinrich Ghisler in the Dodis database of the Diplomatic Documents of Switzerland | II. Secretary | | Ernst Brugger | Mustafa Bülent Ecevit | |
| January 15, 1975 | Charles Masset | Charles Masset in the Dodis database of the Diplomatic Documents of Switzerland | Ambassador | | Pierre Graber | Süleyman Demirel | October 30, 1976 |
| 1976 | Johann Heinrich Ghisler | Johann Heinrich Ghisler in the Dodis database of the Diplomatic Documents of Switzerland | Secretary | | Rudolf Gnägi | Süleyman Demirel | |
| December 19, 1976 | Georges Bonnant | Georges Bonnant in the Dodis database of the Diplomatic Documents of Switzerland | Ambassador | | Rudolf Gnägi | Süleyman Demirel | January 31, 1980 |
| March 22, 1980 | Dieter Chenaux-Repond | Dieter Chenaux-Repond in the Dodis database of the Diplomatic Documents of Switzerland | Ambassador | | Georges-André Chevallaz | Bülent Ulusu | March 23, 1983 |
| July 1, 1983 | André Maillard | André Maillard in the Dodis database of the Diplomatic Documents of Switzerland | Ambassador | | Pierre Aubert | Turgut Özal | September 30, 1987 |
| September 16, 1987 | Adolf Lacher | Adolf Lacher in the Dodis database of the Diplomatic Documents of Switzerland | Ambassador | | Pierre Aubert | Turgut Özal | March 26, 1991 |
| May 11, 1991 | Pierre Barraz | Pierre Barraz in the Dodis database of the Diplomatic Documents of Switzerland | Ambassador | | Flavio Cotti | Ahmet Mesut Yılmaz | February 20, 1993 |
| April 1, 1993 | Paul André Ramseyer | Paul André Ramseyer in the Dodis database of the Diplomatic Documents of Switzerland | Ambassador | | Adolf Ogi | Tansu Çiller | August 31, 1993 |
| December 9, 1994 | André Faivet | André Faivet in the Dodis database of the Diplomatic Documents of Switzerland | Ambassador | | Otto Stich | Tansu Çiller | |
| January 19, 2009 | Raimund Kunz | Raimund Kunz in the Dodis database of the Diplomatic Documents of Switzerland | Ambassador | | Hans-Rudolf Merz | Recep Tayyip Erdoğan | March 2013 |
| March 11, 2013 | Walter Haffner | | | From 2008 to August 2012 he was ambassador in Tel Aviv, From August 2012 to 2013 he was ambassador to Latvia, Lithuania | Guy Parmelin | Recep Tayyip Erdoğan | December 31, 2021 |
