= List of ambassadors of Switzerland to China =

Coordinates: 39.944249°N 116.460544°E

Ambassador of Switzerland to China
- Incumbent; Jürg Burri since September 2022
- Inaugural holder: Henry de Torrenté
- Formation: 1945

The Swiss ambassador in Beijing is the official representative of the Government in Bern to the Government of China.

== List of representatives ==
Diplomatic agrément/Diplomatic accreditation	Ambassador	lifetime	Observations	Diplomatic Documents of Switzerland	List of members of the Swiss Federal Council	Prime Minister of China	Term end
1945	Henry de Torrenté	(1893–1962)	Minister	Henry de Torrenté in the Dodis database of the Diplomatic Documents of Switzerland	Eduard von Steiger		1948
1948	Charles von Jenner	(1886–1970)		Charles von Jenner in the Dodis database of the Diplomatic Documents of Switzerland	Enrico Celio		1949
1949	Jean-Pierre Jéquier	(1919–2010)	Chargé d'affaires	Jean-Pierre Jéquier in the Dodis database of the Diplomatic Documents of Switzerland	Ernst Nobs		1949
May 1950	Sven Stiner	(1910–1968)	Chargé d'affaires	Sven Stiner in the Dodis database of the Diplomatic Documents of Switzerland	Max Petitpierre	Zhou Enlai	November 1950
September 14, 1950			The governments in Beijing and Bern established diplomatic relations.		Max Petitpierre	Zhou Enlai	
November 1950	Clemente Rezzonico	(1897–1976)		Clemente Rezzonico in the Dodis database of the Diplomatic Documents of Switzerland	Max Petitpierre	Zhou Enlai	July 1954
September 7, 1954	Fernand Bernoulli	(1905–1979)		Fernand Bernoulli in the Dodis database of the Diplomatic Documents of Switzerland	Rodolphe Rubattel	Zhou Enlai	April 12, 1957
April 12, 1957	Fernand Bernoulli	(1905–1979)	Ambassador	Fernand Bernoulli in the Dodis database of the Diplomatic Documents of Switzerland	Hans Streuli	Zhou Enlai	December 8, 1958
May 1959	René Naville	(1905–1978)		René Naville in the Dodis database of the Diplomatic Documents of Switzerland	Paul Chaudet	Zhou Enlai	1962
April 1963	Hans Keller (diplomat)	(1908–1999)		Hans Keller in the Dodis database of the Diplomatic Documents of Switzerland	Willy Spühler	Zhou Enlai	1966
March 1967	Oscar Rossetti	(1912–1996)		Oscar Rossetti in the Dodis database of the Diplomatic Documents of Switzerland	Roger Bonvin	Zhou Enlai	February 1972
April 1972	Albert Natural	(1918–2002)		Albert Natural in the Dodis database of the Diplomatic Documents of Switzerland	Nello Celio	Zhou Enlai	1975
September 1975	Heinz Langenbacher	(1919–2013)		Heinz Langenbacher in the Dodis database of the Diplomatic Documents of Switzerland	Pierre Graber	Zhou Enlai	March 1977
May 1977	Werner Sigg	(1917–1989)	May 1975 Werner Sigg, Switzerland A Li Yunchuan Li Yun-chuan B (Sigg left his post, Aug 82)	Werner Sigg in the Dodis database of the Diplomatic Documents of Switzerland	Kurt Furgler	Hua Guofeng	August 1982
November 1982	Hansjakob Müller (1921–2001)	(1921–2001)		Hansjakob Müller in the Dodis database of the Diplomatic Documents of Switzerland	Fritz Honegger	Zhao Ziyang	September 1986
September 1986	Fritz Bohnert	(1928–1988)		Fritz Bohnert in the Dodis database of the Diplomatic Documents of Switzerland	Alphons Egli	Zhao Ziyang	1988
April 1988	Erwin Schurtenberger	(1940–)		Erwin Schurtenberger in the Dodis database of the Diplomatic Documents of Switzerland	Otto Stich	Li Peng	March 1995
April 8, 1995	Uli Sigg	(1946–)		Uli Sigg in the Dodis database of the Diplomatic Documents of Switzerland	Kaspar Villiger	Li Peng	1999
February 5, 1999	Dominique Dreyer	(1945–)		Dominique Dreyer in the Dodis database of the Diplomatic Documents of Switzerland	Ruth Dreifuss	Zhu Rongji	2004
November 2004	Dante Martinelli	(1946–)		Dante Martinelli in the Dodis database of the Diplomatic Documents of Switzerland	Joseph Deiss	Wen Jiabao	2008
2008	Blaise Godet	(1947–)		Blaise Godet in the Dodis database of the Diplomatic Documents of Switzerland	Pascal Couchepin	Wen Jiabao	2012
2012	Jacques de Watteville	(1951–)		Jacques de Watteville in the Dodis database of the Diplomatic Documents of Switzerland	Eveline Widmer-Schlumpf	Wen Jiabao	2013
March 14, 2014	Jean-Jacques de Dardel	(1954–)		Jean-Jacques de Dardel in the Dodis database of the Diplomatic Documents of Switzerland	Didier Burkhalter	Li Keqiang	February 2019
March 11, 2019	Bernardino Regazzoni	(1957–)		Bernardino Regazzoni in the Dodis database of the Diplomatic Documents of Switzerland	Ueli Maurer	Li Keqiang	July 2022
September 2022	Jürg Burri	(1965–)		Jürg Burri in the Dodis database of the Diplomatic Documents of Switzerland	Ignazio Cassis	Li Keqiang	
