= 1940 in Switzerland =

- Decades: 1920s; 1930s; 1940s; 1950s; 1960s
- See also: History of Switzerland; Timeline of Swiss history; List of years in Switzerland

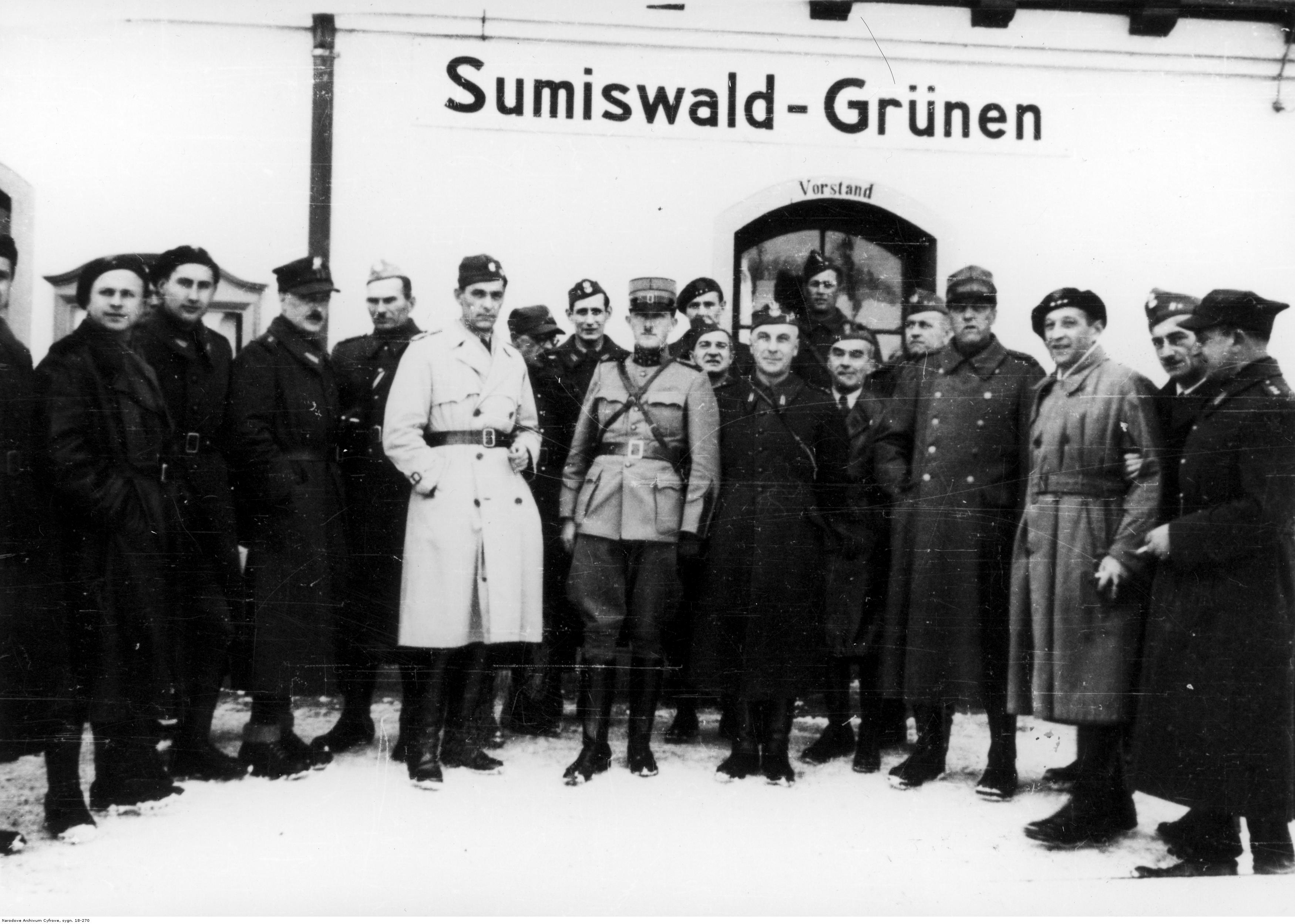
Ceremony at the 2nd Infantry Division in Switzerland

Events during the year 1940 in Switzerland.

== Incumbents ==
- Federal Council:
  - Marcel Pilet-Golaz (president)
  - Philipp Etter
  - Giuseppe Motta (until January)
  - Johannes Baumann (until December)
  - Hermann Obrecht (until July)
  - Ernst Wetter
  - Rudolf Minger (until December)
  - Enrico Celio (from February)
  - Walther Stampfli (from July)
  - Karl Kobelt (from December)
  - Eduard von Steiger (from December)

== Births ==
- 9 January – Ruth Dreifuss, politician
- 11 October – Christoph Blocher, politician
- 27 December – Willi Hofmann, bobsledder

== Deaths ==
- 23 January – Giuseppe Motta, politician (born 1871)
- 29 June – Paul Klee, German-Swiss artist (born 1879)
- 21 August – Hermann Obrecht, politician (born 1882)
