= 1944 in Switzerland =

- Decades: 1920s; 1930s; 1940s; 1950s; 1960s
- See also: History of Switzerland; Timeline of Swiss history; List of years in Switzerland

Events during the year 1944 in Switzerland.

== Incumbents ==
- Federal Council:
  - Walther Stampfli (president)
  - Eduard von Steiger
  - Karl Kobelt
  - Philipp Etter
  - Enrico Celio
  - Ernst Nobs
  - Marcel Pilet-Golaz (until December), then Max Petitpierre

== Events ==
- 1 April – Schaffhausen is accidentally bombed by the United States causing serious damage to the city and killing or wounding more than 100 people.

== Births ==
- 6 January – Rolf M. Zinkernagel, immunologist
- 20 May – Sepp Benz, bobsledder (died 2021)
- 2 September – Claude Nicollier, astronaut
- 8 November – Andreas Sprecher, alpine skier

== Deaths ==
- 22 April – Edmund Schulthess, politician (born 1868)
