= 1936 in Switzerland =

- Decades: 1910s; 1920s; 1930s; 1940s; 1950s
- See also: History of Switzerland; Timeline of Swiss history; List of years in Switzerland

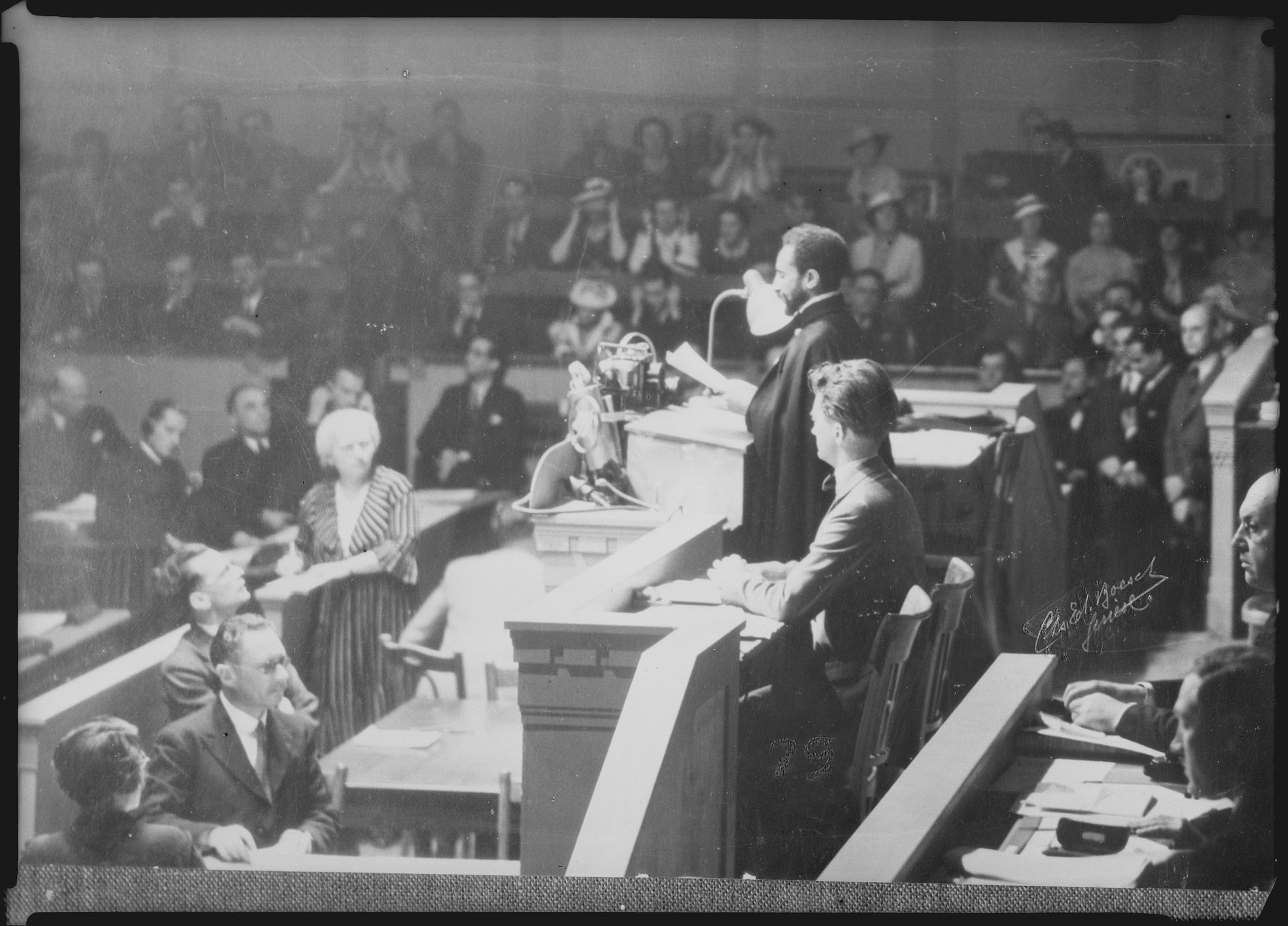
Haile Selassie talks at the League of Nations in Geneva, 1936

The following is a list of events, births, and deaths in 1936 in Switzerland.

== Incumbents ==
- Federal Council:
  - Giuseppe Motta
  - Hermann Obrecht
  - Philipp Etter
  - Johannes Baumann
  - Marcel Pilet-Golaz
  - Albert Meyer (President)
  - Rudolf Minger

== Events ==
- 4 February – Wilhelm Gustloff, leader of the Swiss branch of the Nazi Party is assassinated.
- August – World Jewish Congress founded
- 1935–36 Nationalliga
- 1936 Swiss Grand Prix
- 1936 UCI Road World Championships
- 1936-37 Nationalliga
- RSI Rete Uno, (Network One), a primary radio channel

== Births ==
- 7 January – Claudio Polledri, fencer
- 26 January – Helmut Förnbacher, actor, film director and screenwriter
- 14 March – Bruno Oldani, designer (died 2021 in Norway)
- 19 March – Ursula Andress, actor best known for her role as Honey Ryder in Dr. No
- 1 April – Jean-Pascal Delamuraz, politician (died 1998)
- 25 May – Ely Tacchella, footballer (association football) (died 2017)
- 21 June – Janos Mohoss, fencer
- 22 June – Ingeborg Lüscher, German-Swiss painter
- 19 July – Dieter Keller, chess master
- 18 November – Heinz Bäni, football midfielder (died 2014)
- 7 October – Charles Dutoit, conductor
- 17 November – Frédy Girardet, chef
- 16 December – Elisabeth Kopp, politician (died 2023)
- 24 December – Léo Eichmann, football goalkeeper

== Deaths ==
- 4 February – Wilhelm Gustloff, leader of the Swiss branch of the Nazi Party (born 1895 in Germany)
- 6 May – Hans Jelmoli, composer and pianist (died 1877)

== See also ==
- Switzerland at the 1936 Summer Olympics
- Switzerland at the 1936 Winter Olympics
