= 1937 in Switzerland =

- Decades: 1910s; 1920s; 1930s; 1940s; 1950s
- See also: History of Switzerland; Timeline of Swiss history; List of years in Switzerland

The following is a list of events, births, and deaths in 1937 in Switzerland.

== Incumbents ==
- Federal Council:
  - Giuseppe Motta (president)
  - Hermann Obrecht
  - Philipp Etter
  - Johannes Baumann
  - Marcel Pilet-Golaz
  - Albert Meyer
  - Rudolf Minger

== Events ==
- 1936–37 Nationalliga, won by FC Lugano
- 1937 Swiss Grand Prix, won by Rudolf Caracciola
- 1937–38 Nationalliga, won by Grasshopper Club Zürich
- Nyon Conference, which addresses attacks on shipping in the Spanish Civil War
- Allianz, a group of Swiss artists, is founded
- 1937 Swiss freemasonry referendum

== Literature ==
- An Answer from the Silence, a novel by Max Frisch, is published in Swiss

== Births ==
- 3 February – Billy Meier, prophet
- 9 March – Niele Toroni, painter
- 18 May – Peter Bolliger, rower (d. 2024)
- 20 May – Peter von Matt, philologist (d. 2025)
- 21 May – Hansjörg Hirschbühl, bobsleigher
- 2 June – Pierre Favre, musician
- 30 June – Fritz Egli, motorcycle racer
- 6 July – Joseph Payne, musician (d. 2008)
- 12 July – Fritz Kehl, association footballer
- 21 December – Hansruedi Führer, association footballer
- Attilio Moresi, cyclist (d. 1995)
- Sandro del Prete, painter

== Deaths ==
- 7 April – Hans Steffen, German geographer (born 1936 in Germany)
- 9 May – Walter Mittelholzer, pilot, photographer, and travel writer (born 1894)
- 2 September – Pierre de Coubertin, French historian and founder of the International Olympic Committee (born 1863 in France)
