= 1946 in Switzerland =

- Decades: 1920s; 1930s; 1940s; 1950s; 1960s
- See also: History of Switzerland; Timeline of Swiss history; List of years in Switzerland

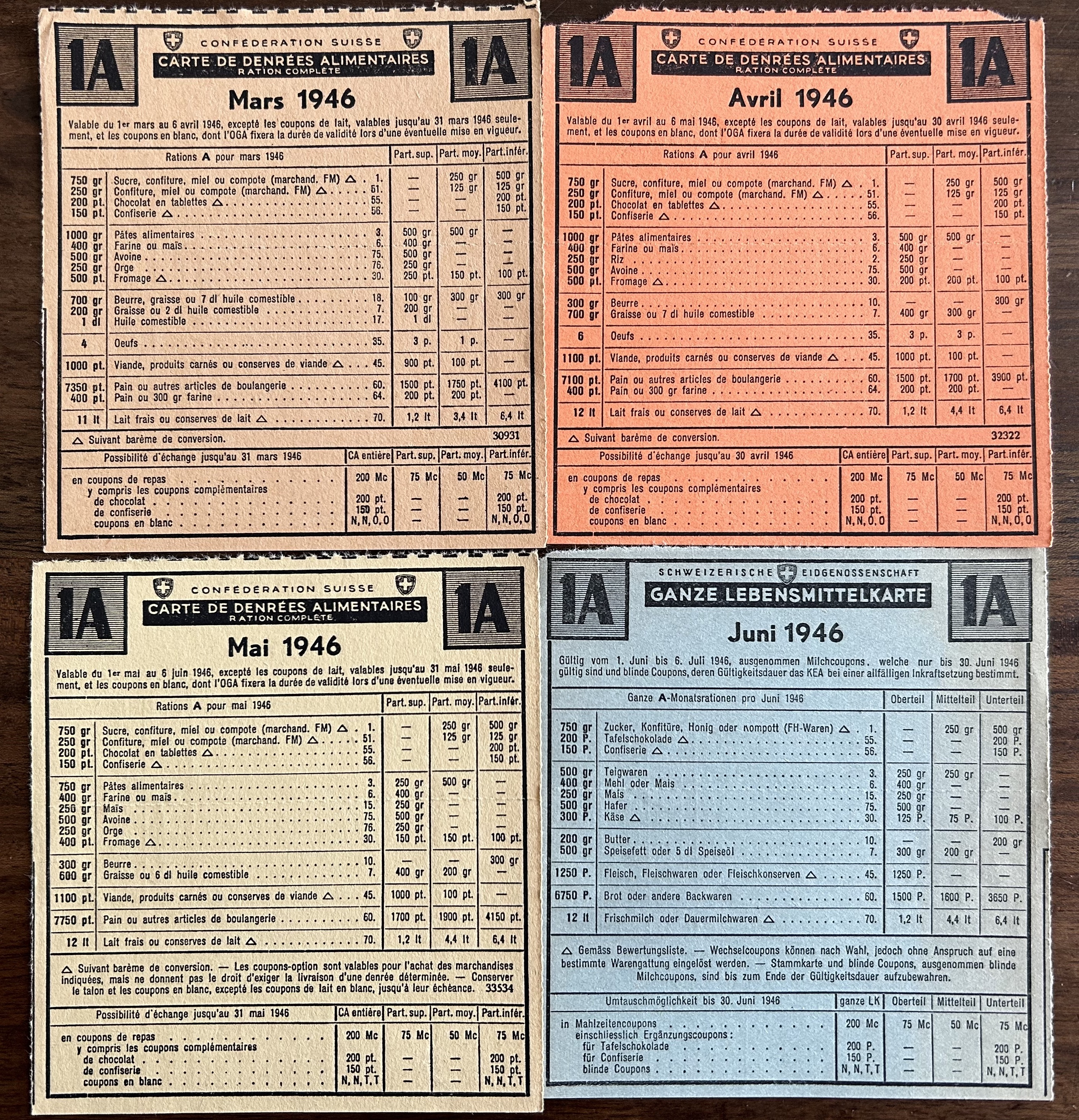
Rationing in Switzerland

Events during the year 1946 in Switzerland.

== Incumbents ==
- Federal Council:
  - Karl Kobelt (president)
  - Philipp Etter
  - Enrico Celio
  - Walther Stampfli
  - Eduard von Steiger
  - Ernst Nobs
  - Max Petitpierre

== Births ==
- 18 January – Joseph Deiss, politician
- 23 January – Fernande Bochatay, alpine skier
- 21 August – Moritz Leuenberger, politician

== Deaths ==
- 10 November – Louis Zutter, gymnast (born 1865)
