= 1942 in Switzerland =

- Decades: 1920s; 1930s; 1940s; 1950s; 1960s
- See also: History of Switzerland; Timeline of Swiss history; List of years in Switzerland

Events during the year 1942 in Switzerland.

== Incumbents ==
- Federal Council:
  - Philipp Etter (president)
  - Marcel Pilet-Golaz
  - Ernst Wetter
  - Karl Kobelt
  - Enrico Celio
  - Walther Stampfli
  - Eduard von Steiger

== Births ==
- 12 January – Michel Mayor, astrophysicist
- 5 April – Pascal Couchepin, politician
- 8 June – Jacques Dubochet, biophysicist
- 18 July – Adolf Ogi, politician
- 10 November – Hans-Rudolf Merz, politician

== Deaths ==
- 15 May – Annemarie Schwarzenbach, author and photographer (born 1908)
- 9 November – Ernest Chuard, politician (born 1857)
