= 1945 in Switzerland =

- Decades: 1920s; 1930s; 1940s; 1950s; 1960s
- See also: History of Switzerland; Timeline of Swiss history; List of years in Switzerland

Events during the year 1945 in Switzerland.

== Incumbents ==
- Federal Council:
  - Eduard von Steiger (president)
  - Karl Kobelt
  - Philipp Etter
  - Enrico Celio
  - Walther Stampfli
  - Ernst Nobs
  - Max Petitpierre

== Events ==
- 4 March – The cities of Basel and Zürich are accidentally bombed by the United States.

== Births ==
- 4 March – Dieter Meier, musician
- 20 May – Gabriela Andersen-Schiess, long-distance runner
- 8 July – Micheline Calmy-Rey, politician

== Deaths ==
- 19 July – Heinrich Wölfflin, art historian (born 1864)
