= 1947 in Switzerland =

- Decades: 1920s; 1930s; 1940s; 1950s; 1960s
- See also: History of Switzerland; Timeline of Swiss history; List of years in Switzerland

Events during the year 1947 in Switzerland.

== Incumbents ==
- Federal Council:
  - Philipp Etter (president)
  - Karl Kobelt
  - Enrico Celio
  - Walther Stampfli (until December), then Rodolphe Rubattel
  - Eduard von Steiger
  - Ernst Nobs
  - Max Petitpierre

== Events ==
- 31 January–2 February – The 1947 European Figure Skating Championships take place in Davos.

== Births ==
- 8 January – Samuel Schmid, politician
- 3 February – Emil Paul Tscherrig, Roman Catholic prelate (d. 2026)
- 23 February – Anton Mosimann, chef
- 13 March – Beat Richner, paediatrician and cellist (d. 2018)
- 22 May – Christine Stückelberger, equestrian

== Deaths ==
- 26 February – Heinrich Häberlin, politician (born 1868)
