= 1970 in Switzerland =

- Decades: 1950s; 1960s; 1970s; 1980s; 1990s
- See also: History of Switzerland; Timeline of Swiss history; List of years in Switzerland

Events during the year 1970 in Switzerland.

== Incumbents ==
- Federal Council:
  - Hans-Peter Tschudi (president)
  - Rudolf Gnägi
  - Roger Bonvin
  - Pierre Graber
  - Ernst Brugger
  - Ludwig von Moos
  - Nello Celio

== Events ==
- 21 February – A plane crashes 15 minutes after leaving Zurich Airport on route to Israel after a bomb planted by PLO members explodes, killing all 47 people on board.

== Births ==
- 6 October – Brigitte Albrecht-Loretan, cross-country skier
- 22 December – Barbara Blatter, mountain biker

== Deaths ==
- 23 May – Hans Streuli, politician (born 1892)
