= 1972 in Switzerland =

- Decades: 1950s; 1960s; 1970s; 1980s; 1990s
- See also: History of Switzerland; Timeline of Swiss history; List of years in Switzerland

Events during the year 1972 in Switzerland.

== Incumbents ==
- Federal Council:
  - Nello Celio (president)
  - Hans-Peter Tschudi
  - Roger Bonvin
  - Rudolf Gnägi
  - Pierre Graber
  - Ernst Brugger
  - Kurt Furgler

== Births ==
- 27 January – Mirjam Ott, curler
- 9 April – Alain Berset, politician
- 19 April – Sonja Nef, alpine skier
- 31 May – Tanya Frei, curler
- 30 June – Nadia Röthlisberger, curler (died 2015)
- 4 July – Karin Thürig, cyclist
- 27 November – Maya Pedersen-Bieri, skeleton racer

== Deaths ==
- 15 May – Louis Noverraz, sailor (born 1902)
- 23 September – Frédéric Schmied, sculptor (born 1893)
