= 1971 in Switzerland =

- Decades: 1950s; 1960s; 1970s; 1980s; 1990s
- See also: History of Switzerland; Timeline of Swiss history; List of years in Switzerland

Events during the year 1971 in Switzerland.

== Incumbents ==
- Federal Council:
  - Rudolf Gnägi (president)
  - Hans-Peter Tschudi
  - Roger Bonvin
  - Pierre Graber
  - Ernst Brugger
  - Ludwig von Moos (until December), then Kurt Furgler
  - Nello Celio

== Events ==
- 2–7 February – The 1971 European Figure Skating Championships take place in Zürich.
- 7 February – A referendum giving women the right to vote in Federal elections takes place.

== Births ==
- 12 February – Olivier Schmutz, judoka
- 20 March – Annick Bonzon, alpine skier
- 1 May – Natascia Leonardi Cortesi, cross-country skier
- 8 September – Daniela Baumer, canoeist
- 9 September – Magali Messmer, triathlete
- 19 October – Luzia Ebnöther, curler
