= 1968 in Switzerland =

- Decades: 1940s; 1950s; 1960s; 1970s; 1980s
- See also: History of Switzerland; Timeline of Swiss history; List of years in Switzerland

Events during the year 1968 in Switzerland.

== Incumbents ==
- Federal Council:
  - Willy Spühler (president)
  - Hans Schaffner
  - Hans-Peter Tschudi
  - Roger Bonvin
  - Rudolf Gnägi
  - Nello Celio
  - Ludwig von Moos

== Births ==
- 22 March – Laurence Bidaud, curler
- 2 May – Jeff Agoos, American association footballer
- 25 September – Sabine Eichenberger, canoeist

== Deaths ==
- 5 January – Karl Kobelt, politician (born 1891)
- 6 September – Giuseppe Lepori, politician (born 1902)
- 10 December – Karl Barth, Protestant theologian (born 1886)
