= 1935 in Switzerland =

- Decades: 1910s; 1920s; 1930s; 1940s; 1950s
- See also: History of Switzerland; Timeline of Swiss history; List of years in Switzerland

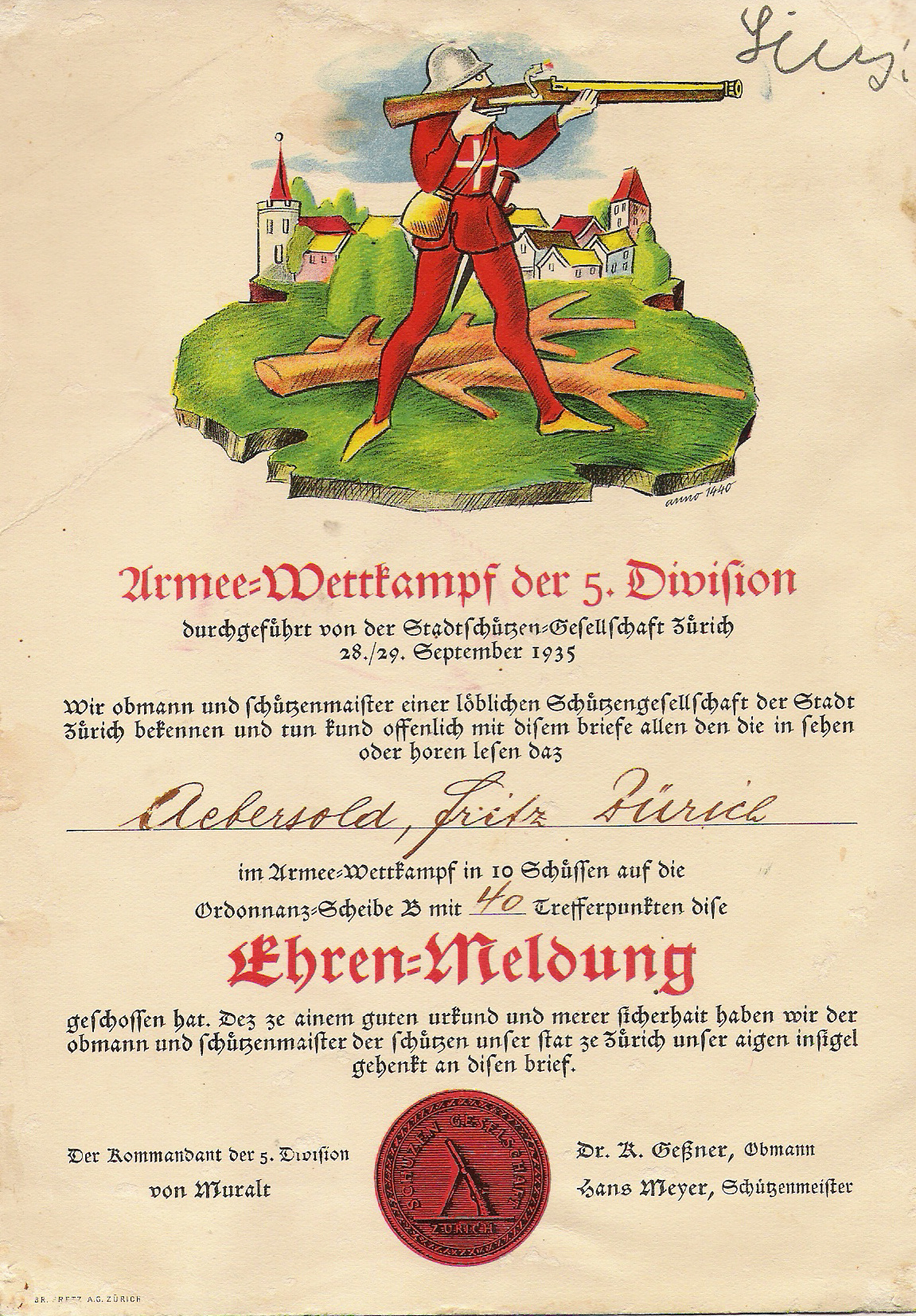
Voluntary shooting match of the Swiss Army, 1935

The following is a list of events, births, and deaths in 1935 in Switzerland.

== Incumbents ==
- Federal Council:
  - Giuseppe Motta
  - Edmund Schulthess then Hermann Obrecht
  - Philipp Etter
  - Johannes Baumann
  - Marcel Pilet-Golaz
  - Albert Meyer
  - Rudolf Minger (President)

== Events ==
- 23-26 January – The 1935 European Figure Skating Championships take place in St. Moritz.
- 1934-35 Nationalliga
- 1935 European Figure Skating Championships
- FIS Alpine World Ski Championships 1935
- 1935 Swiss Grand Prix
- 1935 World Ice Hockey Championships
- EuroBasket 1935 took place in Geneva in May
- 1935–36 Nationalliga
- The Berne Trial, which began in 1933, ends
- The Eternal Mask, an Austrian-Swiss drama, is released
- 1935 Swiss federal election
- 1935 Swiss referendums

== Births ==
- 5 February – Michel Steininger, fencer
- 5 March – Felix Walker, politician
- 24 March – Peter Bichsel, writer and journalist (died 2025)
- 12 April – Heinz Schneiter, footballer (died 2017)
- 16 August – Bruno Spoerri, musician
- 18 September – Dimitri, clown (died 2016)
- 19 September – Hansjörg Wyss, businessman and philanthropist
- 11 November – Raymund Schwager, Roman Catholic priest and theologian (died 2004)
- Martina Deuchler, academic
- Peter Baumann, psychiatrist (died 2011)

== Deaths ==
- 26 March – Eugene Zimmerman, Swiss-American cartoonist (born 1862)
- 19 September – Jules Cambon, French diplomat who died in Switzerland (born 1845)
- Benita von Falkenhayn, German baroness who served as a spy for the Second Polish Republic (born 1900)
- François de Loys, oil geologist who allegedly discovered a hitherto-unknown primate (born 1892)
