= 1973 in Switzerland =

- Decades: 1950s; 1960s; 1970s; 1980s; 1990s
- See also: History of Switzerland; Timeline of Swiss history; List of years in Switzerland

Events during the year 1973 in Switzerland.

== Incumbents ==
- Federal Council:
  - Roger Bonvin (president, until December)
  - Hans-Peter Tschudi (until December)
  - Nello Celio (until December)
  - Rudolf Gnägi
  - Pierre Graber
  - Ernst Brugger
  - Kurt Furgler
  - Georges-André Chevallaz (from December)
  - Hans Hürlimann (from December)
  - Willi Ritschard (from December)

== Events ==
- 10 April – A plane on route from Bristol, England to Basel crashes into a hillside while approaching the airport killing 108 out of the 145 people on board.
- 23–24 June – The 1973 ICF Canoe Slalom World Championships take place in Muotathal.

== Births ==
- 8 February – Ursula Wyss, politician and economist
- 10 March – Ada Marra, politician
- 26 April – Andres Gerber, footballer
- 1 May – Oliver Neuville, German footballer
- 2 September – Sibylle Matter, triathlete
- Urs Fischer, artist
- Sébastien Schneeberger, Swiss-born Canadian politician

== Deaths ==
- 14 May – Jean Gebser, German-born Swiss author, linguist and poet (born 1905)
- 6 July – Otto Klemperer, German conductor (born 1885 in Germany)
- 12 August – Walter Rudolf Hess, physicist (born 1881)
