= 1939 in Switzerland =

- Decades: 1910s; 1920s; 1930s; 1940s; 1950s
- See also: History of Switzerland; Timeline of Swiss history; List of years in Switzerland

Events during the year 1939 in Switzerland.

== Incumbents ==
- Federal Council:
  - Philipp Etter (president)
  - Giuseppe Motta
  - Johannes Baumann
  - Hermann Obrecht
  - Marcel Pilet-Golaz
  - Albert Meyer (until December), then Ernst Wetter
  - Rudolf Minger

== Events ==
- 27–29 January – The men's events of the 1939 European Figure Skating Championships take place in Davos.

== Births ==
- 18 May – Doris Ramseier, equestrian
- 18 October – Flavio Cotti, politician (died 2020)

== Deaths ==
- 15 October – Robert Haab, politician (born 1865)
