= 1938 in Switzerland =

- Decades: 1910s; 1920s; 1930s; 1940s; 1950s
- See also: History of Switzerland; Timeline of Swiss history; List of years in Switzerland

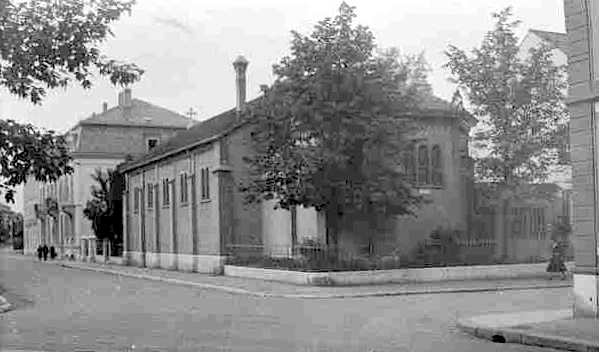
Apostolic Chapel in Basel, Switzerland

Events during the year 1938 in Switzerland.

== Incumbents ==
- Federal Council:
  - Johannes Baumann (president)
  - Giuseppe Motta
  - Hermann Obrecht
  - Philipp Etter
  - Marcel Pilet-Golaz
  - Albert Meyer (until December), then Ernst Wetter
  - Rudolf Minger

== Events ==
- The 1938 European Figure Skating Championships take place in St. Moritz.

== Births ==
- 11 February – Edith Mathis, operatic soprano (d. 2025)
- 27 March – Hansjörg Schneider, novelist
- 2 August – Yvonne Rüegg, alpine skier
- 4 October – Kurt Wüthrich, chemist

== Deaths ==
- 13 May – Charles Édouard Guillaume, physicist (born 1861)
- 15 June – Ernst Ludwig Kirchner, German painter (born 1880 in Germany)
