= 1969 in Switzerland =

- Decades: 1940s; 1950s; 1960s; 1970s; 1980s
- See also: History of Switzerland; Timeline of Swiss history; List of years in Switzerland

Events during the year 1969 in Switzerland.

== Incumbents ==
- Federal Council:
  - Ludwig von Moos (president)
  - Hans-Peter Tschudi
  - Rudolf Gnägi
  - Roger Bonvin
  - Willy Spühler (resigned January 1970), succeeded by Pierre Graber from December 1969
  - Hans Schaffner (until December), succeeded by Ernst Brugger from December 1969
  - Nello Celio

== Births ==
- 20 March – Heidi Diethelm Gerber, sports shooter
- 22 December – Gianna Hablützel-Bürki, fencer

== Deaths ==
- 25 September – Paul Scherrer, physicist (born 1890)
