= 1874 in Switzerland =

- Decades: 1850s; 1860s; 1870s; 1880s; 1890s
- See also: History of Switzerland; Timeline of Swiss history; List of years in Switzerland

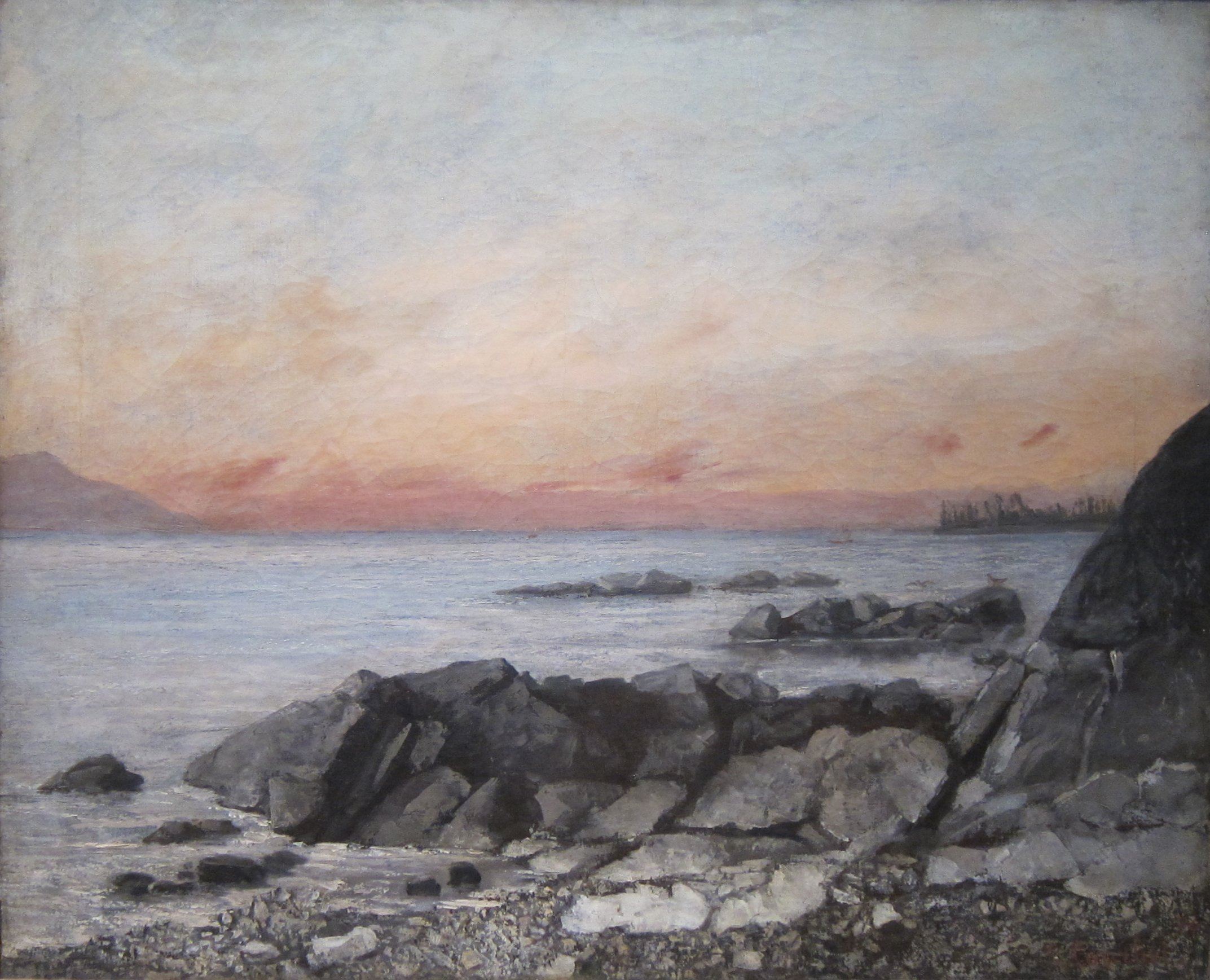
Sunset, Vevey, Switzerland by Gustave Courbet, 1874

Events during the year 1874 in Switzerland.

== Incumbents ==
- Federal Council:
  - Karl Schenk (president)
  - Emil Welti
  - Johann Jakob Scherer
  - Eugène Borel
  - Paul Ceresole
  - Melchior Josef Martin Knüsel
  - Wilhelm Matthias Naeff

== Events ==
- A revised version of the Swiss Federal Constitution is signed, superseding the version signed in 1848.

== Births ==
- 25 September – Noëlle Roger, writer (born 1953)
- 21 October – Henri Guisan, military leader (died 1960)
- 27 November – Johannes Baumann, politician (died 1953)
