= 1889 in Switzerland =

- Decades: 1860s; 1870s; 1880s; 1890s; 1900s
- See also: History of Switzerland; Timeline of Swiss history; List of years in Switzerland

Events during the year 1889 in Switzerland.

== Incumbents ==
- Federal Council:
  - Bernhard Hammer (president)
  - Karl Schenk
  - Emil Welti
  - Numa Droz
  - Antoine Louis John Ruchonnet
  - Adolf Deucher
  - Walter Hauser

== Births ==
- 19 January – Sophie Taeuber-Arp, artist (died 1943)
- 28 April – Charles-Gustave Kuhn, equestrian (died 1952)
- 19 June – Enrico Celio, politician (died 1980)
- 9 August – Hans Walter, rower (died 1967)
- 31 December – Marcel Pilet-Golaz, politician (died 1958)

== Deaths ==
- 14 January – Melchior Josef Martin Knüsel, politician (born 1813)
