= 1886 in Switzerland =

- Decades: 1860s; 1870s; 1880s; 1890s; 1900s
- See also: History of Switzerland; Timeline of Swiss history; List of years in Switzerland

Events during the year 1886 in Switzerland.

== Incumbents ==
- Federal Council:
  - Adolf Deucher (president)
  - Bernhard Hammer
  - Karl Schenk
  - Emil Welti
  - Numa Droz
  - Antoine Louis John Ruchonnet
  - Wilhelm Hertenstein

== Events ==
- Grasshopper Football Club is founded.

== Births ==
- 10 May – Karl Barth, Protestant theologian (died 1968)
- 14 July – Ernst Nobs, politician (died 1957)
- 1 September – Othmar Schoeck, composer (died 1957)
- 6 October – Edwin Fischer, pianist and conductor (died 1960)
