= Uli Sigg =

Swiss businessman, diplomat, art collector

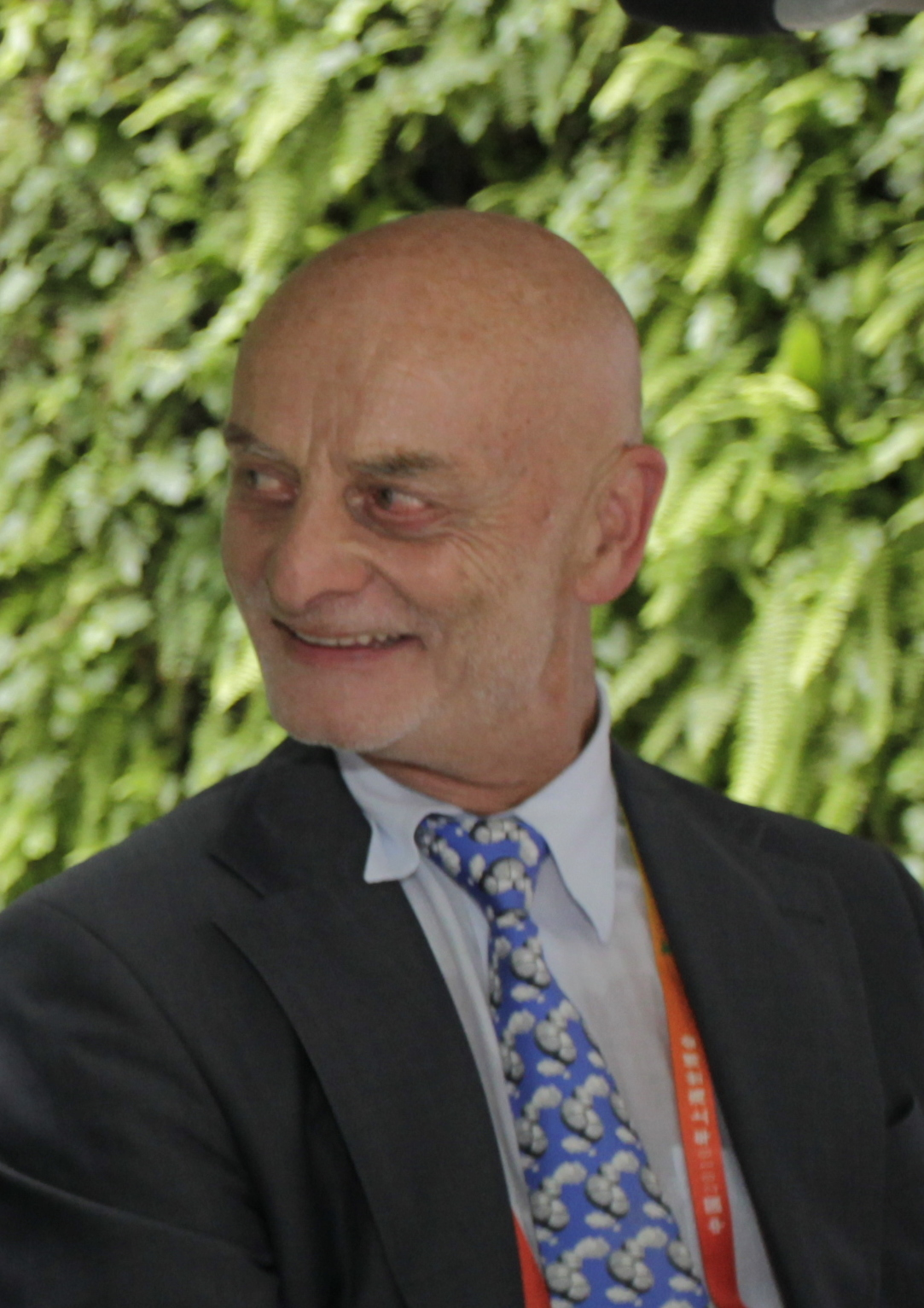
- Uli Sigg in 2010.
- Born: 1946 (age 79–80)
- Education: University of Zurich
- Occupations: Businessman, diplomat, art collector
- Spouse: Rita Sigg

Uli Sigg (born 1946) is a Swiss businessman, diplomat and art collector. He served as the Swiss Ambassador to China, North Korea and Mongolia from 1995 to 1998. He serves as the vice chairman of Ringier, the largest media company in Switzerland. He made a large donation of contemporary Chinese art to the Hong Kong–based M+ museum in 2012.

== Early life ==
Uli Sigg was born in 1946. He received a PhD in Law from the University of Zurich.

== Career ==
Sigg started his career as a business journalist. By 1977, he worked for the Schindler Group, where he was an expatriate in China. He left the company in 1990. He was a company director for the next five years, serving on the boards of Swiss corporations.

Sigg served as the Swiss Ambassador to China, North Korea and Mongolia from 1995 to 1998.

As of 2009, he served as the vice chairman of Ringier, a media company. He also served on the advisory board of the China Development Bank.

Sigg serves on the Executive Advisory Board of the World.Minds Foundation.

== Art collection ==
Sigg became the largest private collector of contemporary Chinese art in the world. His collection included "2,000 works by more than 350 Chinese artists". Meanwhile, in 1997, he started the annual Chinese Contemporary Art Awards.

In 2012, he donated 1,463 works by 350 Chinese artists from his collection to the M+, a new museum in Hong Kong, scheduled to open in 2019. The donation includes 26 works by Ai Weiwei and other works by "Ding Yi, Fang Lijun, Geng Jianyi, Gu Wenda, Huang Yongping, Liu Wei, Xu Bing and Zhang Xiaogang". The combined works are worth an estimated US$163 million.

Sigg kept 300 works in his personal collection. Parts of the art collection can be found at Sigg's Mauensee Castle, which lies on its own island in Lake Mauensee.

He serves on the International Council of the Museum of Modern Art in New York City and the International Advisory Council of the Tate in London, United Kingdom.

As the Swiss Ambassador to North Korea, Sigg used his official contacts to gain access to the two North Korean art cooperatives, Mansudae Art Studio and Mount Paektu. He is the only foreign art collector permitted to purchase works by North Korean artists portraying the country’s leaders, Kim Il Sung and Kim Jong Il. The North Korea government even wanted him to build a contemporary art museum in North Korea, although he declined.

== Personal life ==
Sigg is married.

== See also ==
- List of ambassadors of Switzerland to China
