= 1904 in Switzerland =

- Decades: 1880s; 1890s; 1900s; 1910s; 1920s
- See also: History of Switzerland; Timeline of Swiss history; List of years in Switzerland

Events from the year 1904 in Switzerland.

== Incumbents ==
- Federal Council:
  - Robert Comtesse (president)
  - Eduard Müller
  - Adolf Deucher
  - Ernst Brenner
  - Joseph Zemp
  - Marc-Emile Ruchet
  - Ludwig Forrer

== Events ==
- 16–17 January – 1904 European Figure Skating Championships take place in Davos.
- The Swiss Federation of Jewish Communities is established.

== Births ==
- 17 November – Paul Chaudet, politician (died 1977)
