= Hans Bässler =

Swiss fencer (born 1934)

Personal information
- Born: 11 February 1934 (age 92) Basel, Switzerland

Sport
- Sport: Fencing

Hans Peter Bässler (born 11 February 1934) is a Swiss fencer. He competed in the team épée event at the 1960 Summer Olympics.
