= 1888 in Switzerland =

- Decades: 1860s; 1870s; 1880s; 1890s; 1900s
- See also: History of Switzerland; Timeline of Swiss history; List of years in Switzerland

Events during the year 1888 in Switzerland.

== Incumbents ==
- Federal Council:
  - Wilhelm Hertenstein (president, until November)
  - Bernhard Hammer (vice-president)
  - Karl Schenk
  - Emil Welti
  - Numa Droz
  - Antoine Louis John Ruchonnet
  - Adolf Deucher
  - Walter Hauser (from December)

== Events ==
- 21 October – The Social Democratic Party of Switzerland is established.

== Births ==
- 11 November – Johannes Itten, painter and teacher (died 1967)

== Deaths ==
- 27 November – Wilhelm Hertenstein, politician (born 1825)
