= List of mayors of Sion, Switzerland =

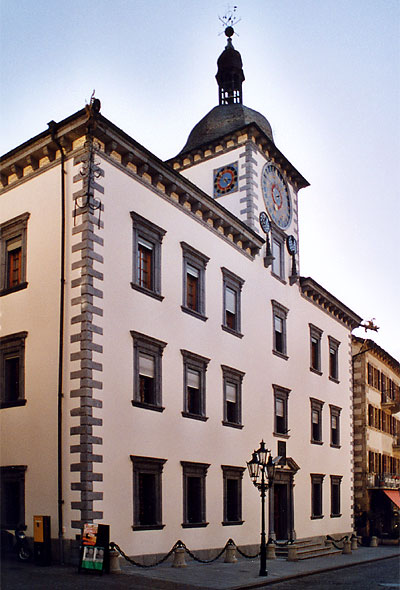
Hôtel-de-Ville, Sion

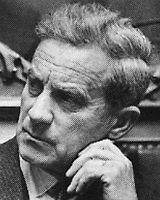
Roger Bonvin (1907–1982) was mayor of Sion from 1955–1962 before becoming member of the Swiss Federal Council (1962–1973)

This is a list of mayors of the city of Sion, Valais, Switzerland. The executive of the city of Sion is its Conseil municipal or Conseil exécutif. Its presiding member is the Président de la Ville de Sion.

Mayor of Sion
Term	Mayor	Lifespan	Party	Notes
1899–1907	Joseph Ribordy	(1857–1923)		
1907–1910	Charles-Albert de Courten	(1870–1947)		
1911–1918	Alexis Graven	(1867–1933)		
1918–1920	Henri Leuzinger	(1879–1956)		
1920–1945	Joseph Kuntschen	(1883–1954)	PDC	
1945–1952	Adalbert Bacher	(1892–1952)	PDC	
1953–1955	Georges Maret		PDC	
1955–1962	Roger Bonvin	(1907–1982)	PDC	
1962–1972	Emile Imesch	(1899-1972)	PDC	
1972	Antoine Dubuis		PDC	
1973–1984	Félix Carruzzo	(1925–2011)	PDC	
1985–1996	Gilbert Debons	(born 1938)	PDC	
1997–2008	François Mudry		PDC	
2009–2016	Marcel Maurer	(born 1953)	PLR/FDP	
2017-today	Philippe Varone		PLR/FDP	
