= 1902 in Switzerland =

- Decades: 1880s; 1890s; 1900s; 1910s; 1920s
- See also: History of Switzerland; Timeline of Swiss history; List of years in Switzerland

Events from the year 1902 in Switzerland.

== Incumbents ==
- Federal Council:
  - Joseph Zemp (president)
  - Eduard Müller
  - Adolf Deucher
  - Walter Hauser (until October)
  - Ernst Brenner
  - Robert Comtesse
  - Marc-Emile Ruchet
  - Ludwig Forrer (from December)

== Births ==
- 31 January – Willy Spühler, politician (died 1990)
- 10 May – Louis Noverraz, sailor (died 1972)
- 2 June – Giuseppe Lepori, politician (died 1968)
- 13 September – Richard Paul Lohse, painter (died 1988)
- 16 September – Jean Bourgknecht, politician (died 1964)
- 20 December – Rudolf Geigy, biologist (died 1995)

== Deaths ==
- 22 October – Walter Hauser, politician (born 1837)
