= 1890 in Switzerland =

- Decades: 1870s; 1880s; 1890s; 1900s; 1910s
- See also: History of Switzerland; Timeline of Swiss history; List of years in Switzerland

Events during the year 1890 in Switzerland.

== Incumbents ==
- Federal Council:
  - Antoine Louis John Ruchonnet (president)
  - Bernhard Hammer (until December), then Emil Frey
  - Karl Schenk
  - Emil Welti
  - Numa Droz
  - Adolf Deucher
  - Walter Hauser

== Births ==
- 3 February – Paul Scherrer, physicist (died 1969)
- 15 September – Frank Martin, composer (died 1974 in the Netherlands)
- 22 September – Ferdinand Gonseth, mathematician and philosopher (died 1975)
- Rudolf Bosshard, rower (died 1980)

== Deaths ==
- 3 November – Ulrich Ochsenbein, politician (born 1811)
- 11 November – Frédéric Guillaume de Pury, Swiss-Australian winemaker (born 1831)
