= 1879 in Switzerland =

- Decades: 1850s; 1860s; 1870s; 1880s; 1890s
- See also: History of Switzerland; Timeline of Swiss history; List of years in Switzerland

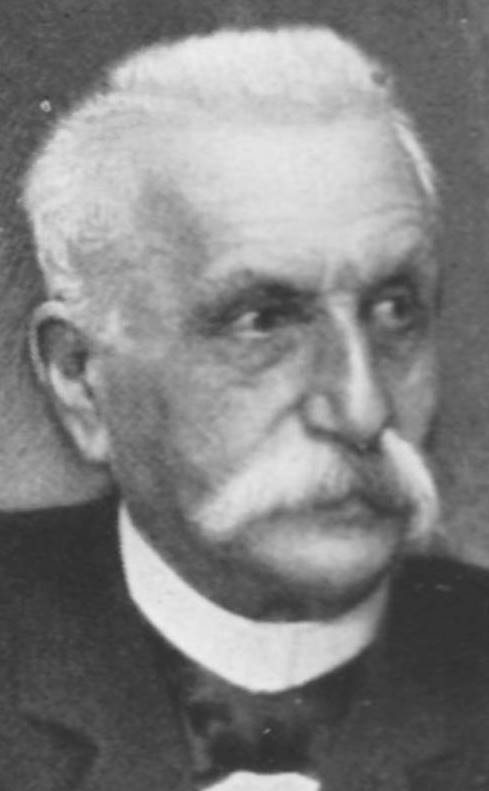
Simeon Bavier, Swiss Federal Councillor

Events during the year 1879 in Switzerland.

== Incumbents ==
- Federal Council:
  - Bernhard Hammer (president)
  - Karl Schenk
  - Emil Welti
  - Fridolin Anderwert
  - Numa Droz
  - Simeon Bavier
  - Wilhelm Hertenstein

== Births ==
- 26 March – Othmar Ammann, Swiss-born American engineer (died 1965)
- 18 December – Paul Klee, German-Swiss artist (died 1940)

== Deaths ==
- 13 January – Jakob Dubs, politician (born 1822)
- 1 March – Joachim Heer, politician (born 1825)
- 15 May – Jakob Stämpfli, politician (born 1820)
