= Lobsigensee =

Lake in the canton of Bern, Switzerland

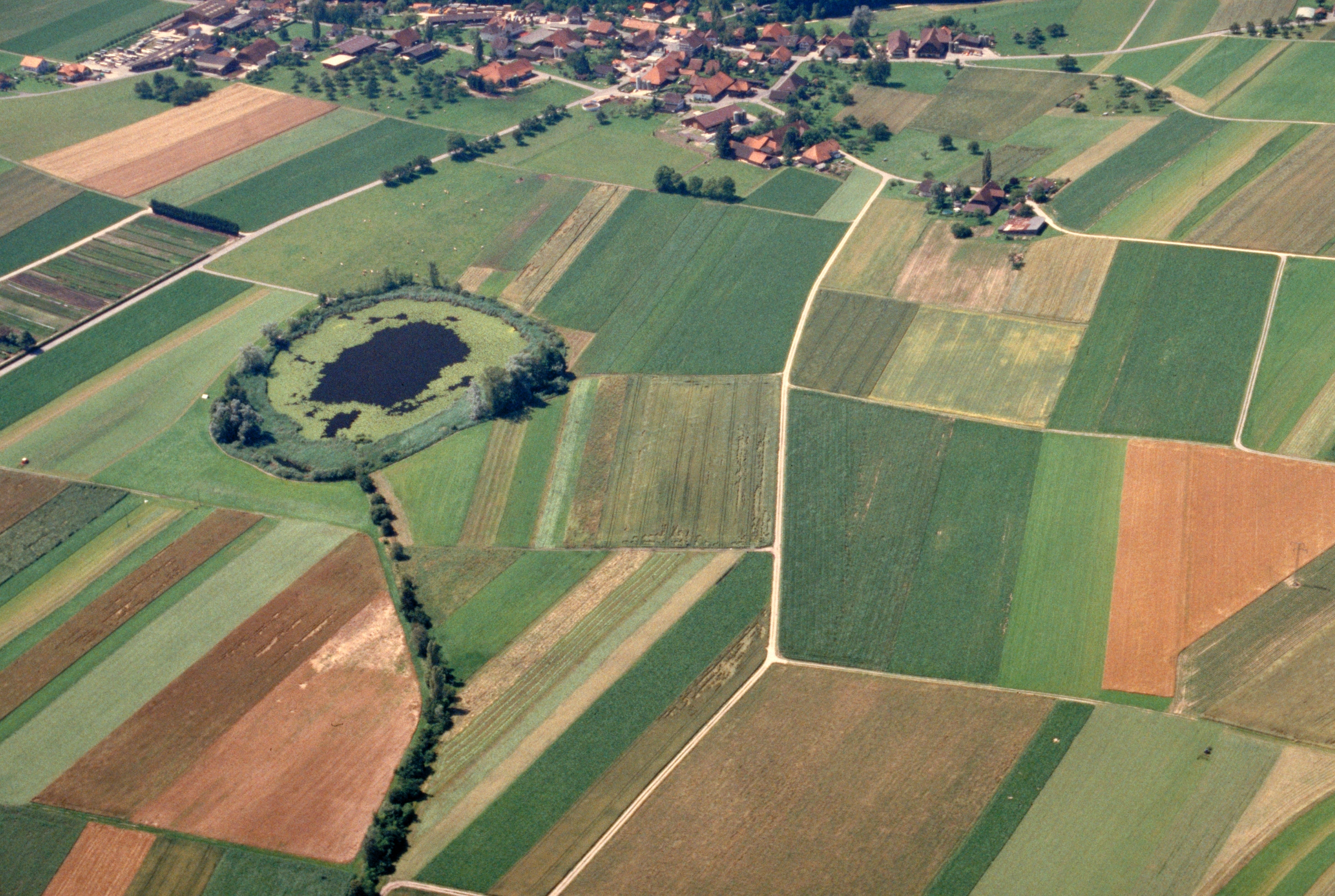

- Location within Canton of Bern Location within Switzerland Location within Alps
- Interactive map of Lobsigensee
- Location: Seedorf, Canton of Bern
- Coordinates: 47°01′51″N 7°17′53″E
- Catchment area: 93.2 ha (230 acres)
- Basin countries: Switzerland
- Surface area: 1.73 ha (4.3 acres)
- Surface elevation: 514 m (1,686 ft)

Lobsigensee is a lake at Lobsigen in Seedorf, canton of Bern, Switzerland. Its surface area is 1.73 ha (4.3 acres).

On the northwestern shore there are remains of a Neolithic settlement that is now part of the Prehistoric Pile dwellings around the Alps, an UNESCO World Heritage Site.

The Lobsigensee UNESCO site is on the southwestern shore of the lake. Based on several finds, the site has been dated to the second half of the 4th millennium BC. The first excavation was carried out in 1908, followed by test digs in 1924 and 1953. Starting in the 1950s private collectors found a number of artifacts in Lobsigensee. In 2005 and 2007 the site was explored again. The recent excavations discovered a burnt layer that indicated that at least one of the settlements was destroyed by a fire. The 2005 test borings identified numerous huts or houses.
