= 1877 in Switzerland =

- Decades: 1850s; 1860s; 1870s; 1880s; 1890s
- See also: History of Switzerland; Timeline of Swiss history; List of years in Switzerland

Jungfrau from Interlaken, 1877

Events during the year 1877 in Switzerland.

== Incumbents ==
- Federal Council:
  - Joachim Heer (president)
  - Karl Schenk
  - Emil Welti
  - Johann Jakob Scherer
  - Bernhard Hammer
  - Fridolin Anderwert
  - Numa Droz

== Births ==
- 17 February – Isabelle Eberhardt, explorer and author (died 1904 in Algeria)
- 27 August – Ernst Wetter, politician (died 1963)

== Deaths ==
- 31 December – Gustave Courbet, French painter (born 1819 in France)
