= Noëlle Roger =

Swiss author (1874–1953)

Hélène Pittard
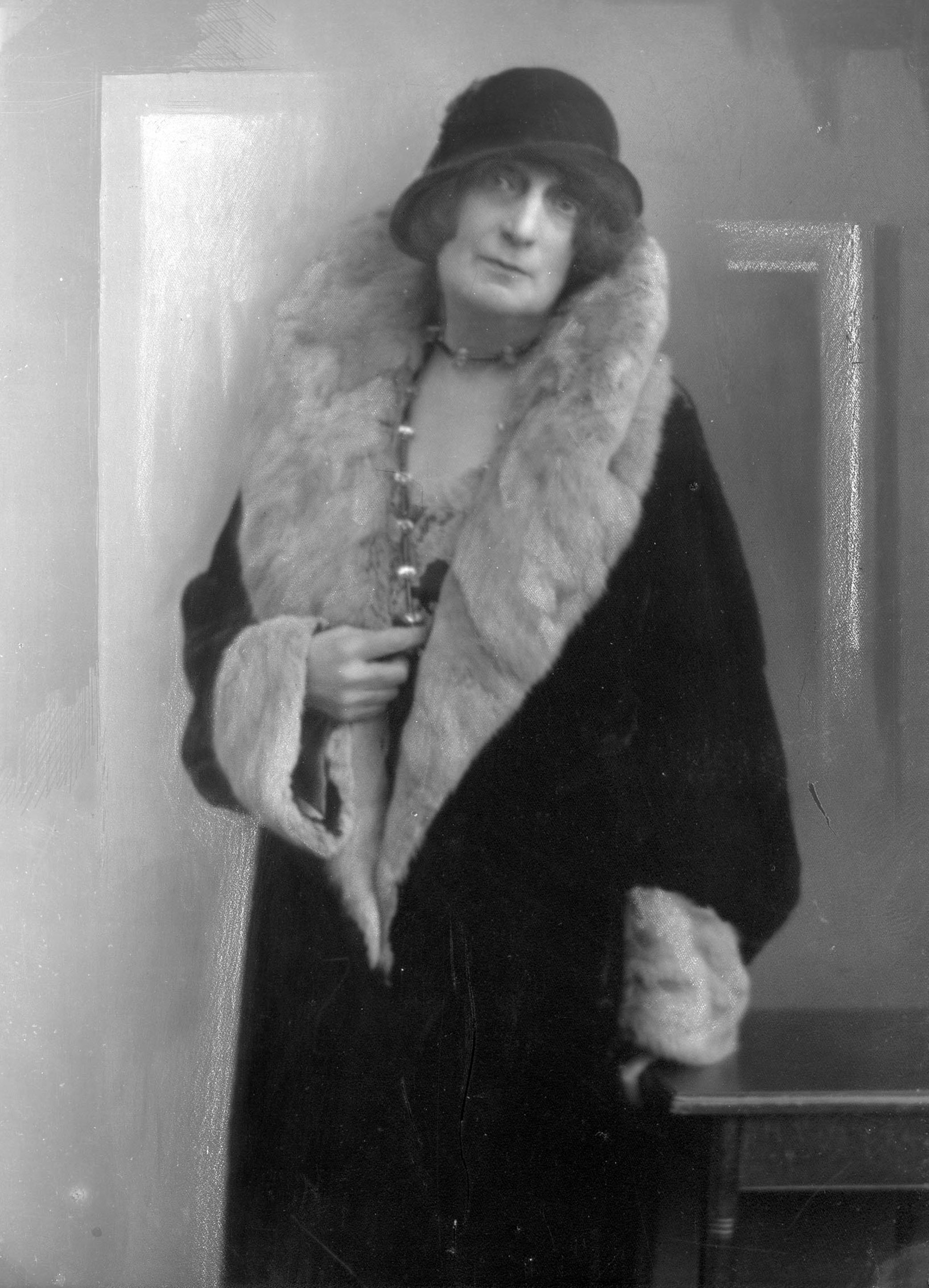
- Born: Hélène Dufour; 25 September 1874; Geneva, Switzerland
- Died: 5 October 1953 (aged 79); Geneva, Switzerland
- Writing career
- Pen name: Noëlle Roger
- Genres: novel, play, short story, science fiction

Noëlle Roger, the pen name of Hélène Pittard (25 September 1874 – 5 October 1953), was a Swiss author writing in French.

== Biography ==
The daughter of Théophile Dufour, a Swiss jurist, and Léonie Bordier, she was born Hélène Dufour in Geneva. Her maternal grandfather was Henri Bordier, a French historian. In her youth, she showed talent for both poetry and painting, eventually choosing to focus on writing.

Her first novel Larmes d'enfant was published in 1896. Her pen name was derived from the two names of brothers: reversing Léon gave Noëlle and Roger was used as is. She apprenticed as a journalist in London. Then, in 1900, she married the anthropologist Eugène Pittard. Her travels with her husband to various places inspired:

- La Route de l'Orient (1914)
- Princesse de Lune, a novel (1929)
- En Asie Mineure (1930)

During World War I, she trained as a nurse and looked after wounded French soldiers at a hospital in Lyon. She published some novels inspired by her experiences during the war and then produced a number of works of speculative fiction including:

- Le nouveau Déluge (1922)
- Le nouvel Adam (1924), translated into English as The New Adam (1926)
- Celui qui voit (1926)
- Le soleil enseveli (1928)
- Le chercheur d'ondes (1931)
- Le nouveau Lazare (1935)

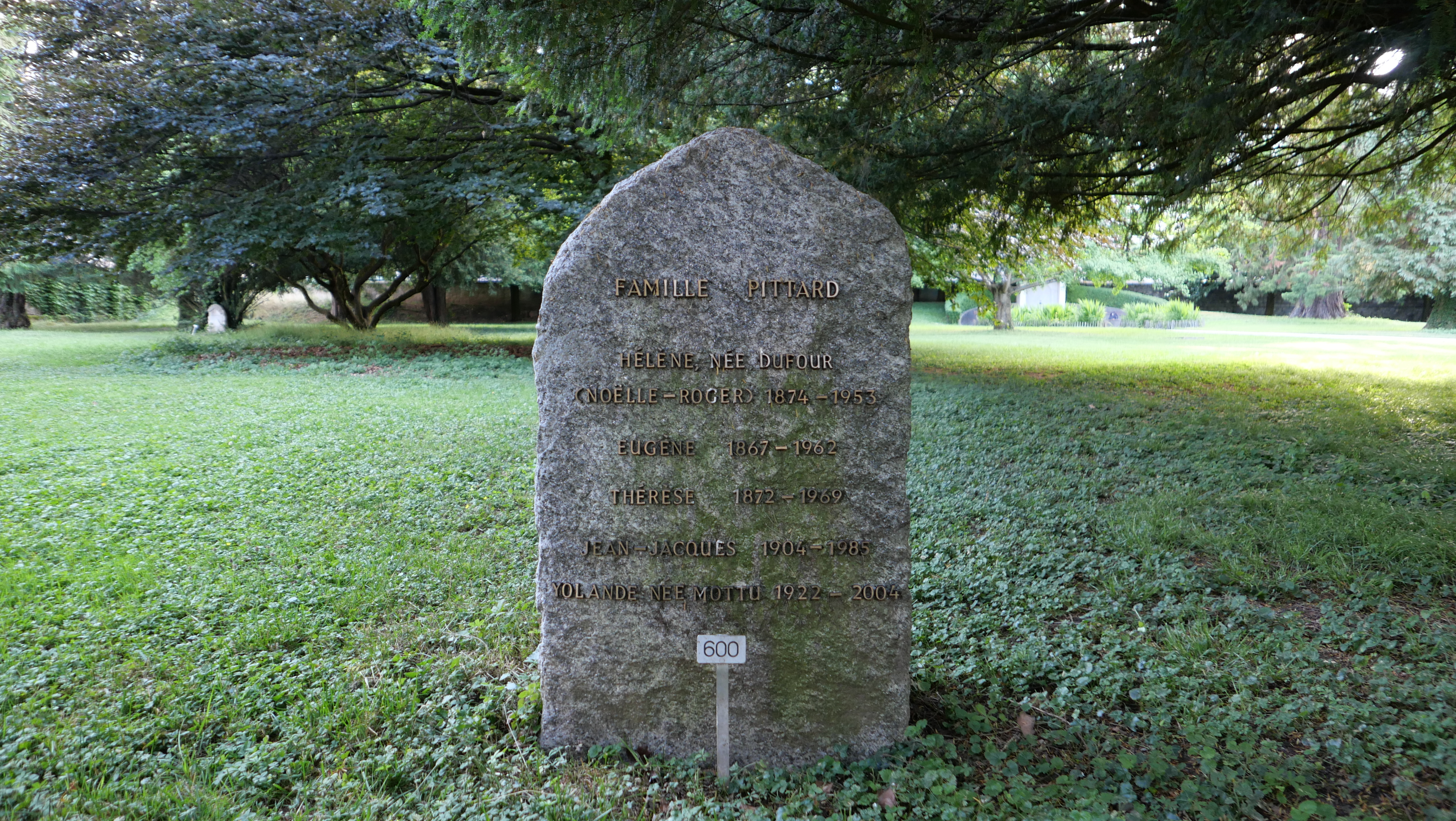
The family grave at the Cimetière des Rois in Geneva

She also produced biographies of Jean-Jacques Rousseau, Germaine de Staël and Henry Dunant, as well as plays for the theatre and for radio.

Works for children included:

- L'Enfant cet inconnu (1941)
- Peau d'éléphant (1943)

In 1948, she received a medal from the Académie française for her work.

She died in Geneva at the age of 78.
