= Sandro del Prete =

Swiss artist (born 1937)

Sandro Del-Prete (born 1937) is a Swiss artist who creates illusionary and surrealistic paintings. His style has been compared to M. C. Escher, though it lacks the latter's mathematical precision.

== Biography ==
Del-Prete was born in Bern, Switzerland in 1937 and went to school in Fribourg, Switzerland. When he was twenty-three Del-Prete spent six months in Florence, Italy, where he attended the Florence Academy of Art. When he returned to Switzerland, Del-Prete began creating religious and symbolic art both in drawing and in sculpture. Initially he worked in the insurance industry and painted or drew just as a hobby.

Del-Prete's interest in Illusionism sprang from his observation of a chameleon. He wondered ‘what the animal really saw, what picture it had of its own world’. He began to look upon different perspectives and in the early 1960s began creating illustrations that would lead to his later ‘illusory’ images. Del-Prete began to experiment, drawing scenes and objects that could be looked at from two different viewpoints.

He completed his first double-perspective painting, ‘Window Gazing’ in 1961 and continued to experiment with the style for the next two decades. In 1981 Del-Prete self published a collection of black and white pencil drawings called Illusorismen. Illusorismen was very successful and convinced Del-Prete to become a professional artist. In 1987 he published a second collection of his art called Illusoria, which was followed by a third book in 2007. One of his sculptures, Loubegaffer, a statue with eyes that seem to follow the viewer, was placed on permanent display in the main rail station in Bern.

He opened a gallery on Schwarztorstrasse in Bern, before moving, in 2002, to nearby Ittigen and opening Illusoria-Land. The 700 m^{2} (7,500 sq ft) gallery, fun house and museum displayed many of his works. In 2014 Illusoria-Land closed in Ittigen and moved to Restaurant Kreuz in Hettiswil bei Hindelbank.
