= Léo Eichmann =

Swiss footballer (born 1936)

Personal information
- Date of birth: 24 December 1936 (age 89)
- Height: 1.73 m (5 ft 8 in)
- Position: Goalkeeper

Senior career*
Years	Team	Apps	(Gls)
1960–1966	FC La Chaux-de-Fonds		

International career
1966	Switzerland	2	(0)
- * Club domestic league appearances and goals

Léo Eichmann (born 24 December 1936) is a Swiss football goalkeeper who played for Switzerland in the 1966 FIFA World Cup. He also played for FC La Chaux-de-Fonds.
