= Fritz Kehl =

Swiss footballer (born 1937)

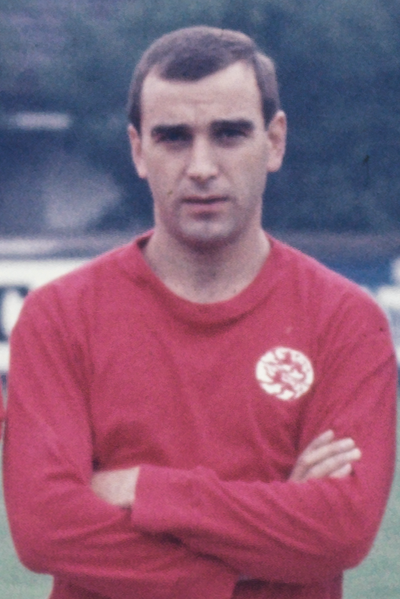

Personal information
- Full name: Friedrich Kehl
- Date of birth: 12 July 1937 (age 89)
- Place of birth: Biel, Switzerland
- Position: Defender

Senior career*
Years	Team	Apps	(Gls)
- FC Zürich

International career
- Switzerland
- * Club domestic league appearances and goals

Friedrich "Fritz" Kehl (born 12 July 1937) is a Swiss football defender who played for Switzerland in the 1962 FIFA World Cup. He also played for FC Zürich.
