= Seedorf, Bern =

Seedorf
- Municipality
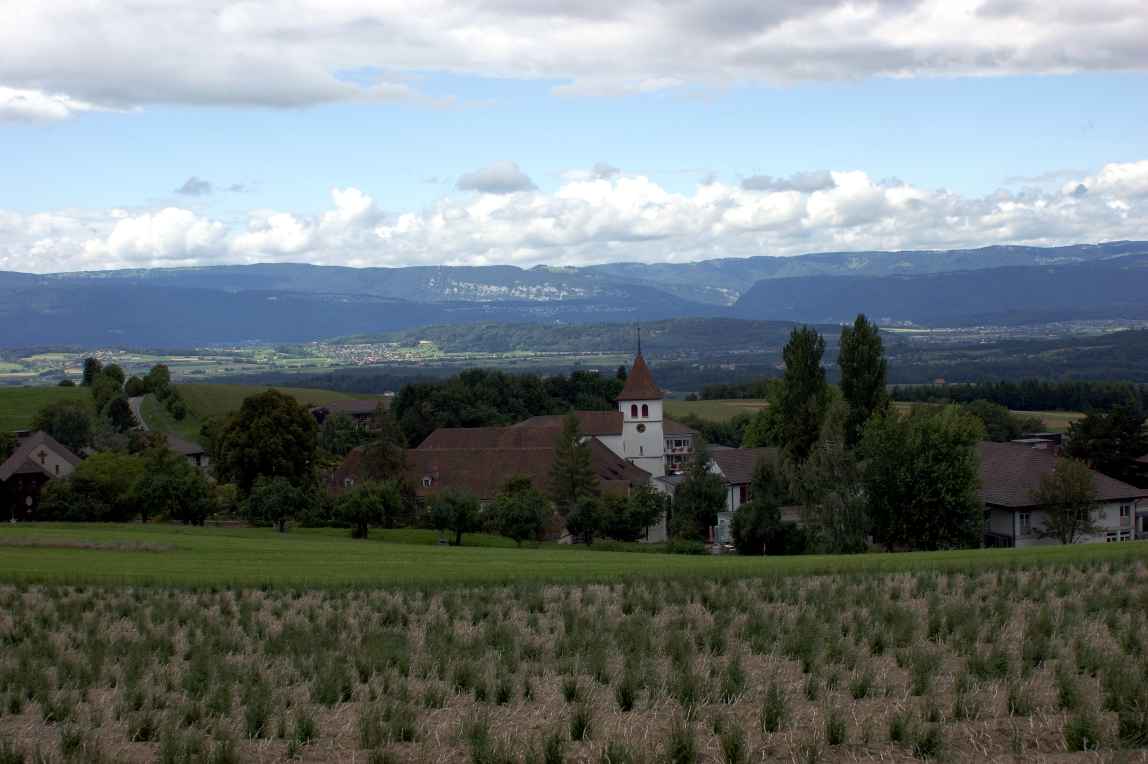
- Frienisberg village in Seedorf municipality

- Flag Coat of arms
- Location of Seedorf
- Location within Switzerland Location within Canton of Bern
- Coordinates: 47°2′N 7°19′E
- Country: Switzerland
- Canton: Bern
- District: Seeland

Area
  - Total: 20.84 km^{2} (8.05 sq mi)
- Elevation: 563 m (1,847 ft)

Population (December 2020)
  - Total: 3,134
  - Density: 150.4/km^{2} (389.5/sq mi)
- Time zone: UTC+01:00 (CET)
  - Summer (DST): UTC+02:00 (CEST)
- Postal code: 3267
- SFOS number: 312
- ISO 3166 code: CH-BE
- Localities: Lobsigen, Wiler, Frieswil, Baggwil, Ruchwil, Dampfwil, Aspi, Grissenberg, Frienisberg
- Surrounded by: Aarberg, Grossaffoltern, Lyss, Meikirch, Radelfingen, Schüpfen, Wohlen bei Bern
- Website: www.seedorf.ch

Seedorf (Swiss Standard German pronunciation: [ˈzeːdɔrf]) is a municipality in the Seeland administrative district in the canton of Bern in Switzerland.

== History ==
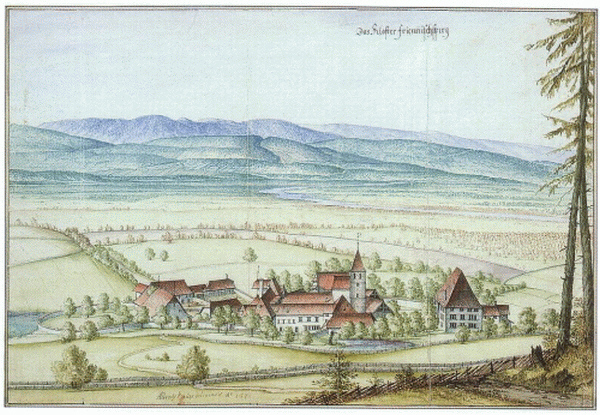
Frienisberg Abbey in 1670

Seedorf is first mentioned around 1173-80 as Sedorf.

The area around Seedorf was home to a number of prehistoric settlements. The oldest may be the settlement at Lobsigensee from the later half of the 4th millennium BC. It is now a UNESCO World Heritage Site. Other prehistoric sites include; a Hallstatt burial mound at Einschlag, a La Tene skeleton near the Seedorf school house and an early and high medieval settlement near the church.

Except for the village of Frieswil, the entire Seedorf parish belonged to Count Udelhard of Saugern. In 1131, he granted the entire parish to what would become Frienisberg Abbey. Initially he granted his land at Frienisberg to the Cistercian Lützel Abbey. In 1138, the Lützel Abbey sent settlers to Frienisberg to found a new abbey. The new abbey remained small and struggled until the first half of the 13th century, when a number of donations allowed it to expand. In 1233 it owned land in Frienisberg, Allenwil, Ried, Tedlingen, Niederwiler, Werd, Gäserz bei Ins and Montils bei Nugerol. In the second half of the 13th century, the abbey founded the nunneries of Fraubrunnen, Steinen and Tedlingen. In 1267, Udelhard's descendant, the Counts of Thierstein, sold their estates, court and church in Seedorf to the Abbey.

The village church was first mentioned in 1131 and in 1320 it was incorporated into the Abbey. In 1386, the Abbey tied itself closely to Bern, when it accepted Bernese citizenship for its monks and farmers. This close connection with Bern led to the Abbey's downfall. When Bern embraced the Protestant Reformation, many Bernese monasteries, including Frienisberg, were secularized. The last abbot, Urs Hirsinger, fled to Hauterive in the Canton of Fribourg rather than remain in Bern. In 1534, the abbey church was demolished. The former convent building was converted into a hospital in 1533 and it housed the local Bernese bailiff until 1798. The bailiff administered the Frienisberg bailiwick, which included Seedorf and Meikirch.

Starting around 1850, many of the farms shifted from growing crops to raising livestock and producing dairy. However, the swamps of the Seedorfmoos limited the available land. In multiple stages between 1858 and 1957, the Seedorfmoos was drained, which opened up additional land. While Seedorf was on the old Bern-Neuchatel-Aarberg road, it was bypassed by the Bern-Aarberg road in 1850 and the later railroad and highway. Therefore, the local economy has remained rooted in agriculture and small businesses. Beginning in 1920, agriculture became increasingly mechanized and required fewer farm workers. Due to a lack of jobs the population declined for almost 50 years after that time. In the 1970s the population stabilized as commuters and businesses moved from the nearby cities.

In 1834 the Abbey was converted into a home for the deaf-mute. In 1889 it was converted into a nursing home, a role that it still fills today.

== Geography ==
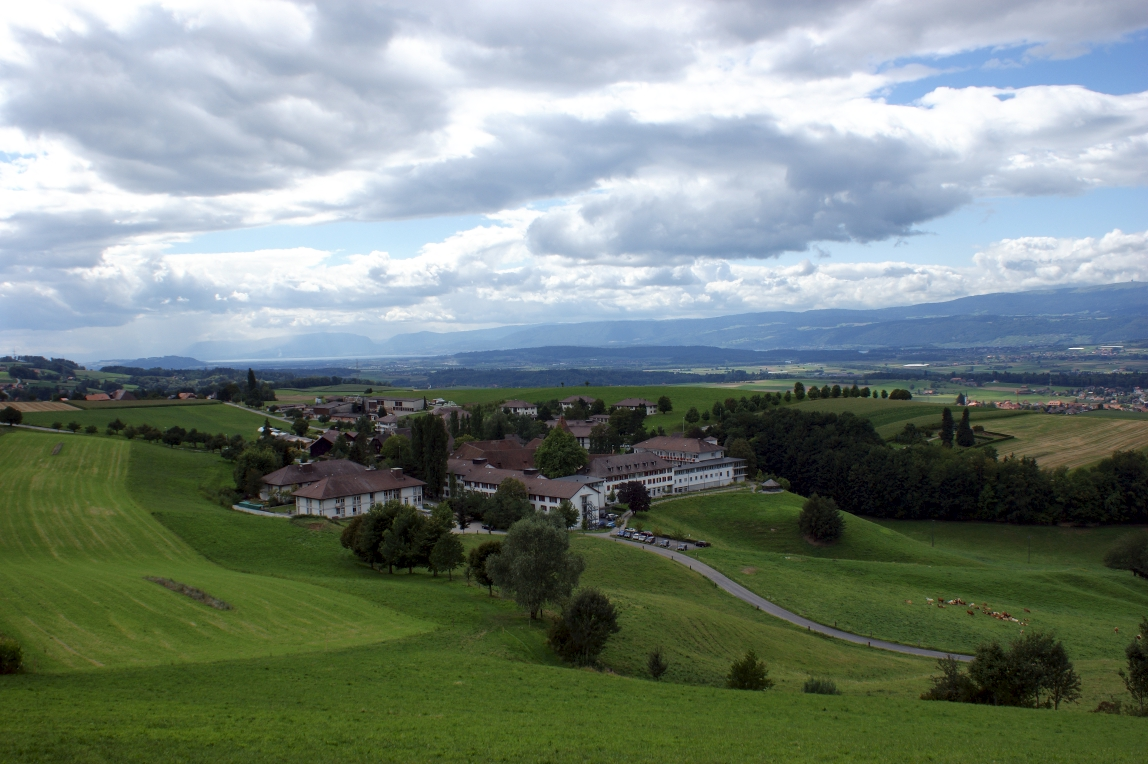
Frienisberg Abbey and surroundings

Aerial view (1954)

Seedorf has an area of 20.87 km^{2} (8.06 sq mi). Of this area, 12.48 km^{2} (4.82 mi^{2}) or 59.7% is used for agricultural purposes, while 6.79 km^{2} (2.62 mi^{2}) or 32.5% is forested. Of the rest of the land, 1.61 km^{2} (0.62 mi^{2}) or 7.7% is settled (buildings or roads), 0.05 km^{2} (12 acres) or 0.2% is either rivers or lakes and 0.01 km^{2} (2.5 acres) or 0.0% is unproductive land.

Of the built up area, housing and buildings made up 4.5% and transportation infrastructure made up 2.4%. Out of the forested land, all of the forested land area is covered with heavy forests. Of the agricultural land, 42.7% is used for growing crops and 14.8% is pastures, while 2.2% is used for orchards or vine crops. All the water in the municipality is flowing water.

The municipality is located on the northern edge of the Frienisberg Plateau at an elevation of between 469 and 823 m (1,539 and 2,700 ft). It consists of the villages of Seedorf, Aspi, Baggwil, Dampfwil, Frienisberg, Frieswil, Lobsigen, Ruchwil and Wilerand, along with eleven hamlets and scattered farm houses.

== Coat of arms ==
The blazon of the municipal coat of arms is Per fess Argent and Azure in chief a Semi Bear rampant issuant Sable langued Gules.

== Demographics ==
Seedorf has a population (as of December 2020) of 3,134. As of 2010, 4.7% of the population are resident foreign nationals. Over the last 10 years (2000-2010) the population has changed at a rate of 2.4%. Migration accounted for 2.5%, while births and deaths accounted for 0.9%.

Most of the population (as of 2000) speaks German (3,037 or 96.6%) as their first language, French is the second most common (21 or 0.7%) and Albanian is the third (17 or 0.5%). There are 7 people who speak Italian.

As of 2008, the population was 48.7% male and 51.3% female. The population was made up of 1,391 Swiss men (46.4% of the population) and 69 (2.3%) non-Swiss men. There were 1,468 Swiss women (48.9%) and 71 (2.4%) non-Swiss women. Of the population in the municipality, 1,096 or about 34.9% were born in Seedorf and lived there in 2000. There were 1,354 or 43.1% who were born in the same canton, while 424 or 13.5% were born somewhere else in Switzerland, and 193 or 6.1% were born outside of Switzerland.

As of 2010, children and teenagers (0–19 years old) make up 20.6% of the population, while adults (20–64 years old) make up 63.4% and seniors (over 64 years old) make up 16%.

As of 2000, there were 1,354 people who were single and never married in the municipality. There were 1,473 married individuals, 201 widows or widowers and 116 individuals who are divorced.

As of 2000, there were 286 households that consist of only one person and 95 households with five or more people. In 2000, a total of 1,091 apartments (92.4% of the total) were permanently occupied, while 55 apartments (4.7%) were seasonally occupied and 35 apartments (3.0%) were empty. The vacancy rate for the municipality, in 2011, was 2.06%.

The historical population is given in the following chart:

== Politics ==
In the 2011 federal election the most popular party was the SVP which received 38% of the vote. The next three most popular parties were the BDP Party (21.8%), the SPS (12.8%) and the Green Party (6.9%). In the federal election, a total of 1,326 votes were cast, and the voter turnout was 55.7%.

== Economy ==
As of 2011, Seedorf had an unemployment rate of 0.71%. As of 2008, there were a total of 1,199 people employed in the municipality. Of these, there were 236 people employed in the primary economic sector and about 73 businesses involved in this sector. 216 people were employed in the secondary sector and there were 36 businesses in this sector. 747 people were employed in the tertiary sector, with 72 businesses in this sector.

In 2008 there were a total of 918 full-time equivalent jobs. The number of jobs in the primary sector was 159, of which 146 were in agriculture and 13 were in forestry or lumber production. The number of jobs in the secondary sector was 198 of which 126 or (63.6%) were in manufacturing and 72 (36.4%) were in construction. The number of jobs in the tertiary sector was 561. In the tertiary sector; 69 or 12.3% were in wholesale or retail sales or the repair of motor vehicles, 46 or 8.2% were in the movement and storage of goods, 33 or 5.9% were in a hotel or restaurant, 49 or 8.7% were in the information industry, 17 or 3.0% were technical professionals or scientists, 24 or 4.3% were in education and 251 or 44.7% were in health care.

In 2000, there were 382 workers who commuted into the municipality and 1,066 workers who commuted away. The municipality is a net exporter of workers, with about 2.8 workers leaving the municipality for every one entering. Of the working population, 13.9% used public transportation to get to work, and 57.4% used a private car.

== Religion ==
From the 2000 census, 212 or 6.7% were Roman Catholic, while 2,561 or 81.5% belonged to the Swiss Reformed Church. Of the rest of the population, there were 20 members of an Orthodox church (or about 0.64% of the population), there were 2 individuals (or about 0.06% of the population) who belonged to the Christian Catholic Church, and there were 233 individuals (or about 7.41% of the population) who belonged to another Christian church. There were 50 (or about 1.59% of the population) who were Islamic. There were 3 individuals who were Hindu and 1 individual who belonged to another church. 116 (or about 3.69% of the population) belonged to no church, are agnostic or atheist, and 60 individuals (or about 1.91% of the population) did not answer the question.

== Education ==
In Seedorf about 1,276 or (40.6%) of the population have completed non-mandatory upper secondary education, and 369 or (11.7%) have completed additional higher education (either university or a Fachhochschule). Of the 369 who completed tertiary schooling, 70.7% were Swiss men, 25.7% were Swiss women, 1.6% were non-Swiss men and 1.9% were non-Swiss women.

The Canton of Bern school system provides one year of non-obligatory Kindergarten, followed by six years of Primary school. This is followed by three years of obligatory lower Secondary school where the students are separated according to ability and aptitude. Following the lower Secondary students may attend additional schooling or they may enter an apprenticeship.

During the 2009-10 school year, there were a total of 252 students attending classes in Seedorf. There were 3 kindergarten classes with a total of 49 students in the municipality. Of the kindergarten students, 10.2% were permanent or temporary residents of Switzerland (not citizens) and 10.2% have a different mother language than the classroom language. The municipality had 11 primary classes and 163 students. Of the primary students, 4.3% were permanent or temporary residents of Switzerland (not citizens) and 4.3% have a different mother language than the classroom language. During the same year, there were 3 lower secondary classes with a total of 40 students. There were 2.5% who were permanent or temporary residents of Switzerland (not citizens).

As of 2000, there were 12 students in Seedorf who came from another municipality, while 173 residents attended schools outside the municipality.

== World Heritage Site ==
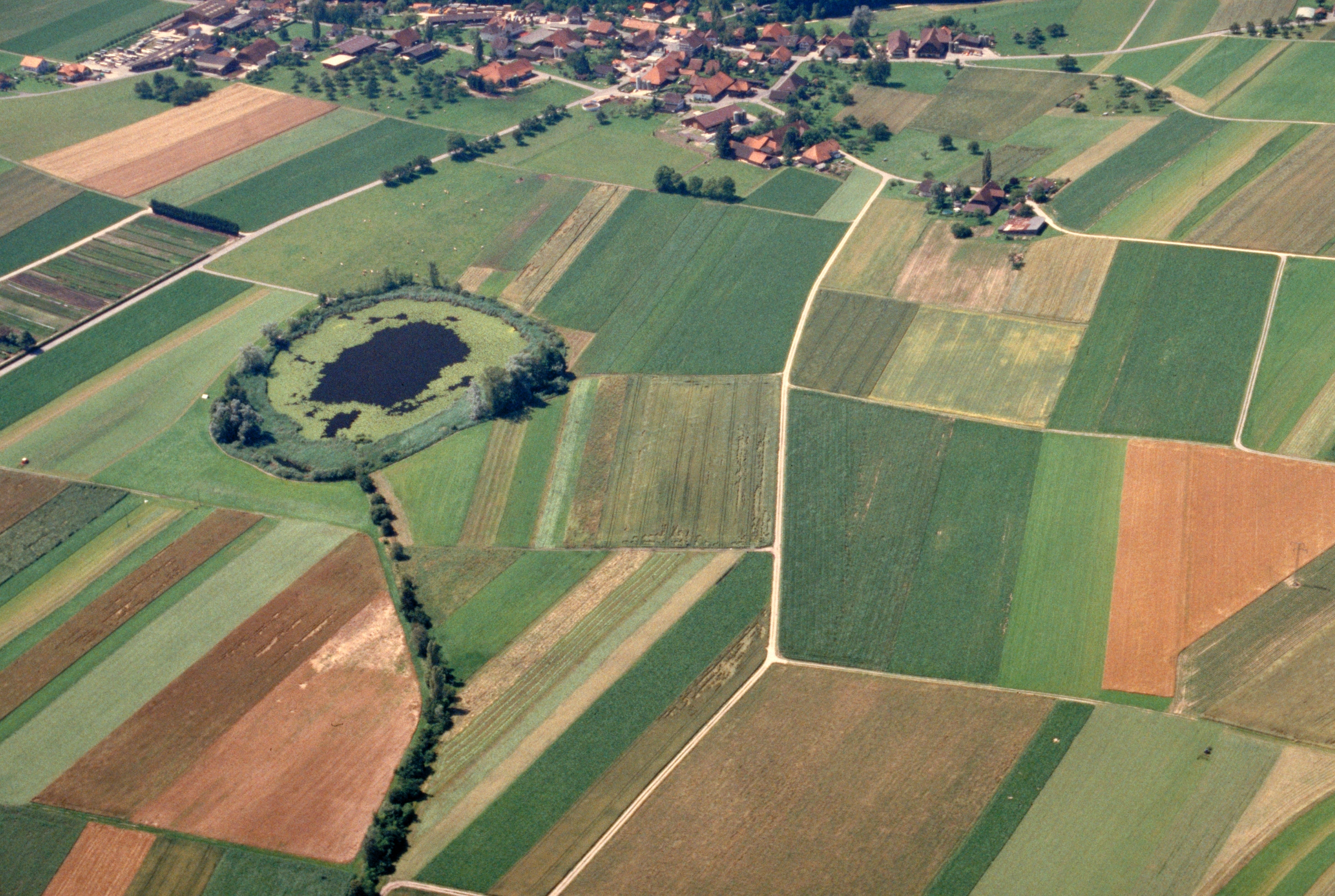
Lobsigensee and the village of Lobsigen

It is home to the Lobsigensee prehistoric pile-dwelling (or stilt house) settlement which is part of the Prehistoric Pile dwellings around the Alps, an UNESCO World Heritage Site.

The Lobsigensee site is located on the south-western shore of the lake of the same name. Based on several finds, the site has been dated to the second half of the 4th millennium BC. The first excavation was carried out in 1908, followed by test digs in 1924 and 1953. Starting in the 1950s private collectors found a number of artifacts in Lobsigensee. In 2005 and 2007 the site was explored again. The recent excavations discovered a burnt layer that indicated that at least one of the settlements was destroyed by a fire. The 2005 test borings identified numerous huts or houses.
