= 1935 Swiss referendums =

Four referendums were held in Switzerland during 1935. The first was held on 24 February on a federal law reorganising the military, and was approved by voters. The second was held on 5 May on a federal law on the transport of goods and animals on roads, and was rejected by two-thirds of voters. The third was held on 2 June on a popular initiative "to combat the economic crisis" and was also rejected by voters. The fourth was held on 8 September on a popular initiative "for a total revision of the federal constitution", and was rejected by 72% of voters.

== Background ==
The June referendum on the popular initiative "to combat the economic crisis" was a mandatory referendum, requiring a double majority; a majority of the popular vote and majority of the cantons. The decision of each canton was based on the vote in that canton. Full cantons counted as one vote, whilst half cantons counted as half. The February and March referendums were "optional", whilst the September referendum was a "process initiating decision", both of which required only a majority of the public vote.

== Results ==
=== February: Reorganisation of the military ===
Choice	Votes	%
For	507,434	54.2
Against	429,520	45.8
Blank votes	11,459	–
Invalid votes	2,267	–
Total	950,680	100
Registered voters/turnout	1,189,573	79.9
Source: Nohlen & Stöver

=== May: Transport of goods and animals ===
Choice	Votes	%
For	232,954	32.3
Against	487,169	67.7
Blank votes	30,393	–
Invalid votes	1,210	–
Total	751,726	100
Registered voters/turnout	1,190,054	63.2
Source: Nohlen & Stöver

=== June: Combating the economic crisis ===
Choice	Popular vote		Cantons		
Choice	Votes	%	Full	Half	Total
For	425,242	42.8	4	2	5
Against	567,425	57.2	15	4	17
Blank votes	12,575	–	–	–	–
Invalid votes	2,043	–	–	–	–
Total	1,007,285	100	19	6	22
Registered voters/turnout	1,194,129	84.4	–	–	–
Source: Nohlen & Stöver

=== September: Total revision of the constitution ===
Choice	Votes	%
For	196,135	27.7
Against	511,578	72.3
Blank votes	17,853	–
Invalid votes	1,497	–
Total	727,063	100
Registered voters/turnout	1,193,941	60.9
Source: Nohlen & Stöver
