= Diplomatic Documents of Switzerland =

Swiss research project

Coordinates: 46.940736°N 7.4476°E

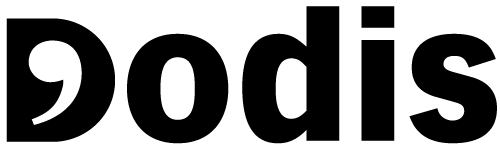
Logo of the Diplomatic Documents of Switzerland project.

Diplomatic Documents of Switzerland (Dodis) is a research project which edits important documents on Swiss foreign relations and contemporary history. The project includes a book series in several volumes and the online database Dodis.

== Aim ==
In contrast to other documentary editions on foreign policy, Dodis is not a state-run project, but the product of academic research. The research group chooses the documents to be published according to independently defined criteria and is only bound to scientific principles. Through their choice of published documents, the researchers aim to show the main features of the international relations of Switzerland while maintaining its diversity. The basic research done by Dodis provides historians with primary sources allowing them to work on specific aspects of Swiss foreign policy or to contextualise more complex developments.

== Organisation ==
Diplomatic Documents of Switzerland is an enterprise of the Swiss Academy for Humanities and Social Sciences (SAGW) and works under the auspices of the Swiss Society for History (SSH). The funding and the administration of the project were taken over by the academy in January 2000 from the Swiss National Science Foundation (SNF), which had until then been the major financial contributor to Dodis. Furthermore, the project is supported by the Swiss Federal Archives (SFA), where the Research Centre is located and by the Federal Department of Foreign Affairs (FDFA). The research centre of Diplomatic Documents of Switzerland is managed by a director. The director is accountable to the Dodis-Committee, which consists of representatives of the contributing organisations and of professors from all of the History departments in Switzerland.

== History ==
In 1972 a group of historians took the initiative to publish documents for the study of Swiss foreign policy and of the international relations of Switzerland. Fifteen volumes covering the period from 1848 until 1945 were subsequently published between 1979 and 1997. Each volume was published by a different team of researchers based at a Swiss university. The project was restructured in the mid 1990s: in the course of planning the second series of the Dodis and an online-database, the various and changing research teams were replaced by a permanent research centre with assigned staff. The work on the second series of the Dodis, covering the period from 1945 until 1989, started in 1997 and at the same time, the database dodis.ch went online.

== Products ==
=== Online database (dodis.ch) ===
Dodis.ch is an integrative and freely accessible internet database of Diplomatic Documents of Switzerland (Dodis). It contains thousands of documents, primarily sourced from the Swiss Federal Archives, which are all related to Swiss foreign relations. The database also links meta-data regarding persons and organisations important to international and Swiss history. Sources can thus be critically contextualised and research can be extended to other Dodis documents as well as the relevant archival holdings. The relational database works in addition to the printed volumes and aims to illustrate in more detail the various aspects of Swiss international relations. The thousands of documents on dodis.ch are, contrary to those in the volumes, not annotated, but indexed and tagged according to scientific criteria. The documents on dodis.ch are scans and can be downloaded in pdf format.

=== Books ===
The book series in several volumes aims to illustrate the main features and the guidelines of the international relations of Switzerland. The documents printed in the volumes, therefore, primarily either show the general orientation of Swiss foreign relations or indicate what at a certain time strongly influenced this orientation. From 1979 until 1997 the first series was published in fifteen volumes covering the period from 1848 until 1945. These volumes were later digitalised and can be accessed on the Swiss Federal Archives' search engine publications officielles numérisées, which uses full text search. The second series covering the period from 1945 until 1989 is to be completed by 2020 and is planned to be published in fifteen volumes, as well. The most recent Volume (Vol. 26 1973–75) was published 2018.
