= Albert Meyer (politician) =

Swiss politician and editor (1870–1953)

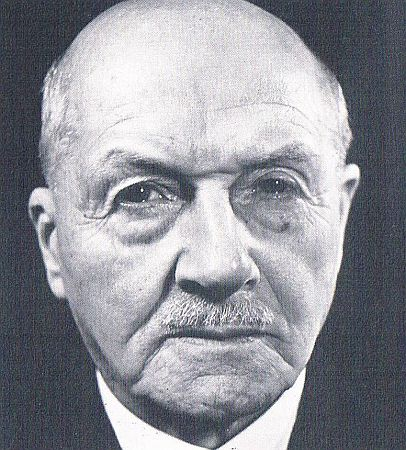

Personal details
- Born: 13 March 1870 Fällanden, Canton of Zurich, Switzerland
- Died: 22 October 1953 (aged 83) Fällanden, Canton of Zurich, Switzerland

Albert Meyer (13 March 1870 – 22 October 1953) was a Swiss politician, editor in chief of Neue Zürcher Zeitung (1915–1930) and member of the Swiss Federal Council (1929–1938). Meyer attended primary and secondary school in his birthplace, followed by the canton school in Zurich. He then studied law and economics at the universities of Zurich, Berlin, and Leipzig. He earned his doctorate in 1895 and began working as a financial secretary for the City of Zurich.

He was elected to the Swiss Federal Council on 12 December 1929 and handed over office on 31 December 1938. He was affiliated to the Free Democratic Party.

During his time in office he held the Department of Home Affairs from 1930 to 1934 and the Department of Finance from 1934 to 1938, and was President of the Confederation in 1936.

Preceded by Robert Haab	Member of the Swiss Federal Council; 1929–1938	Succeeded by Ernst Wetter
