= Ernst Wetter =

Swiss politician

Ernst Wetter (27 August 1877 – 10 August 1963) was a Swiss politician.

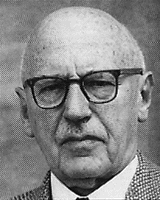
Ernst Wetter

He was elected to the Swiss Federal Council on 15 December 1938 and handed over office on 31 December 1943. He was affiliated to the Free Democratic Party.

During his time in office he held the Department of Finance and was President of the Confederation in 1941.

Preceded by Albert Meyer	Member of the Swiss Federal Council; 1938–1943	Succeeded by Ernst Nobs
