= Eduard von Steiger =

Swiss politician

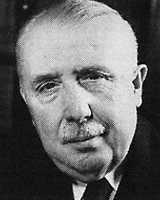
- Official portrait, 1951

51st President of the Swiss Confederation
- In office 1 January 1945 – 31 December 1945
- Preceded by: Walther Stampfli
- Succeeded by: Karl Kobelt
- Constituency: Canton of Bern
- In office 1 January 1951 – 31 December 1951
- Preceded by: Max Petitpierre
- Succeeded by: Karl Kobelt
- Constituency: Canton of Bern

Member of the Federal Council
- In office 1 January 1941 – 31 December 1951

Personal details
- Born: Adolf Eduard von Steiger; 2 July 1881 Langnau im Emmental, Switzerland
- Died: 10 February 1962 (aged 80) Bern, Switzerland
- Spouse: Beatrice Gabrielle von Muelinen (m. 1914)
- Relations: René Derolez (son-in-law)
- Children: 1
- Occupation: Lawyer, politician
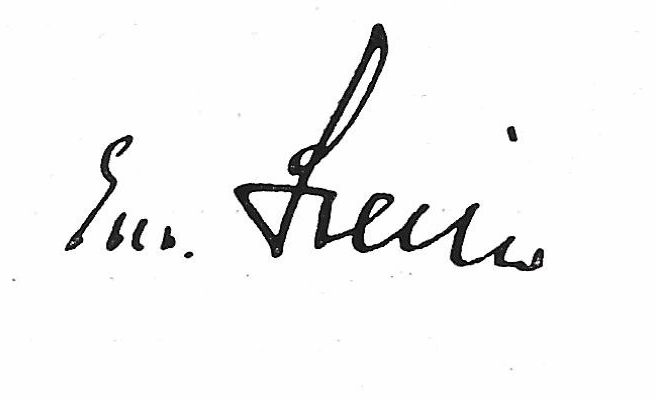
- Signature

Adolf Eduard von Steiger (Swiss Standard German: [ˈeːdu.ard fɔn ˈʃtaɪɡər]; 2 July 1881 – 10 February 1962) was a Swiss lawyer and politician who served as the 51st President of the Swiss Confederation twice in 1945 and 1951 for Party of Farmers, Traders and Independents (presently known as Swiss People's Party). Von Steiger served as a Member of the Federal Council from 1941 to 1951 and previously on the Grand Council of Bern from 1914 to 1939.

He is known for his role in enacting Swiss policy towards the immigration of Jewish refugees during World War II fleeing Nazism, which led to Switzerland's border being closed to them on 13 August 1942. Though archival evidence suggests this policy was initially proposed by Swiss national police chief Heinrich Rothmund, Steiger approved and enacted it together with President Philip Etter. He was known for the sentence "the boat is full" (which was later turned into the movie The Boat Is Full), which he uttered during a speech justifying Switzerland's restrictive policy on 30 August 1942. On this basis, on 2013, the local youth branch of the Swiss Social Democratic Party in Langnau im Emmental, petitioned to revoke his honorary municipal citizenship which he held there since 1944. However, Langnau's municipal council rejected this petition and von Steiger remains an honorary citizen there.

Von Steiger was a lawyer with a private practice in Bern. He also served on a variety of boards such as Schweizerische Volksbank (a predecessor of Credit Suisse) from 1933 to 1940 and Swiss Federal Railways from 1938 to 1940. He also served on the bank council of the Swiss National Bank from 1931 to 1941, during his tenure as Federal Councilor.

== Early life and education ==
Von Steiger was born 2 July 1881 in Langnau im Emmental, the oldest of five children, to Albrecht von Steiger (1851–1928), an engineer, and Anna Sophia Johanna von Steiger (née von Wattenwyl; 1860–1931). The family belonged to the Swiss nobility with both his parents being from the Bernese Patriciate. He studied law at the Universities of Geneva, Leipzig and Berne.

== Political career ==
He became a member of the Conservative Party, was elected a Municipal Councilor of Berne and a Member of the Cantonal Parliament of Berne, all in 1914. He was President of the town of Berne from 1922 to 1929. He was also President of the parliamentary faction of the Party of Farmers, Traders and Independents.

In the Cantonal Parliament, he presided over the Commission of Justice, 1922–26, and over the State Economic Commission, 1929–34. He was President of the Parliamentary Council and elected to the Cantonal Executive Council of Berne in 1939.

He was elected to the Federal Council on 10 December 1940 and handed over office on 31 December 1951. He was affiliated to the Party of Farmers, Traders and Independents (BGB/PAI), now the Swiss People's Party.

During his time in office, he held the Department of Justice and Police and was 51st President of the Confederation twice in 1945 and 1951.

== Personal life ==
In 1914, von Steiger married Béatrice Gabriele von Muelinen, colloquially Beatrix von Steiger (1889–1974), a daughter of Hans-Friedrich von Muelinen and Mathilda Emma Alice von Muelinen (née de Bary). Her father was a head forester for the city of Bern, whilst her mother was a devoted poet and author who served as president and honorary president of the Bernese Lyceum Club and hailed from a silk manufacturing dynasty in Basel. They had a daughter;

- Marie Madeleine Gabrielle von Steiger (born 1915), married to Belgian-born René Lodewijk Maurits Derolez, a philologist and professor for English and Germanic philology at Ghent University.

Von Steiger died on 10 February 1962 in Bern, Switzerland aged 80.

Preceded by Rudolf Minger	Member of the Swiss Federal Council; 1940–1951	Succeeded by Markus Feldmann
