= Rudolf Gnägi =

Swiss politician (1917–1985)

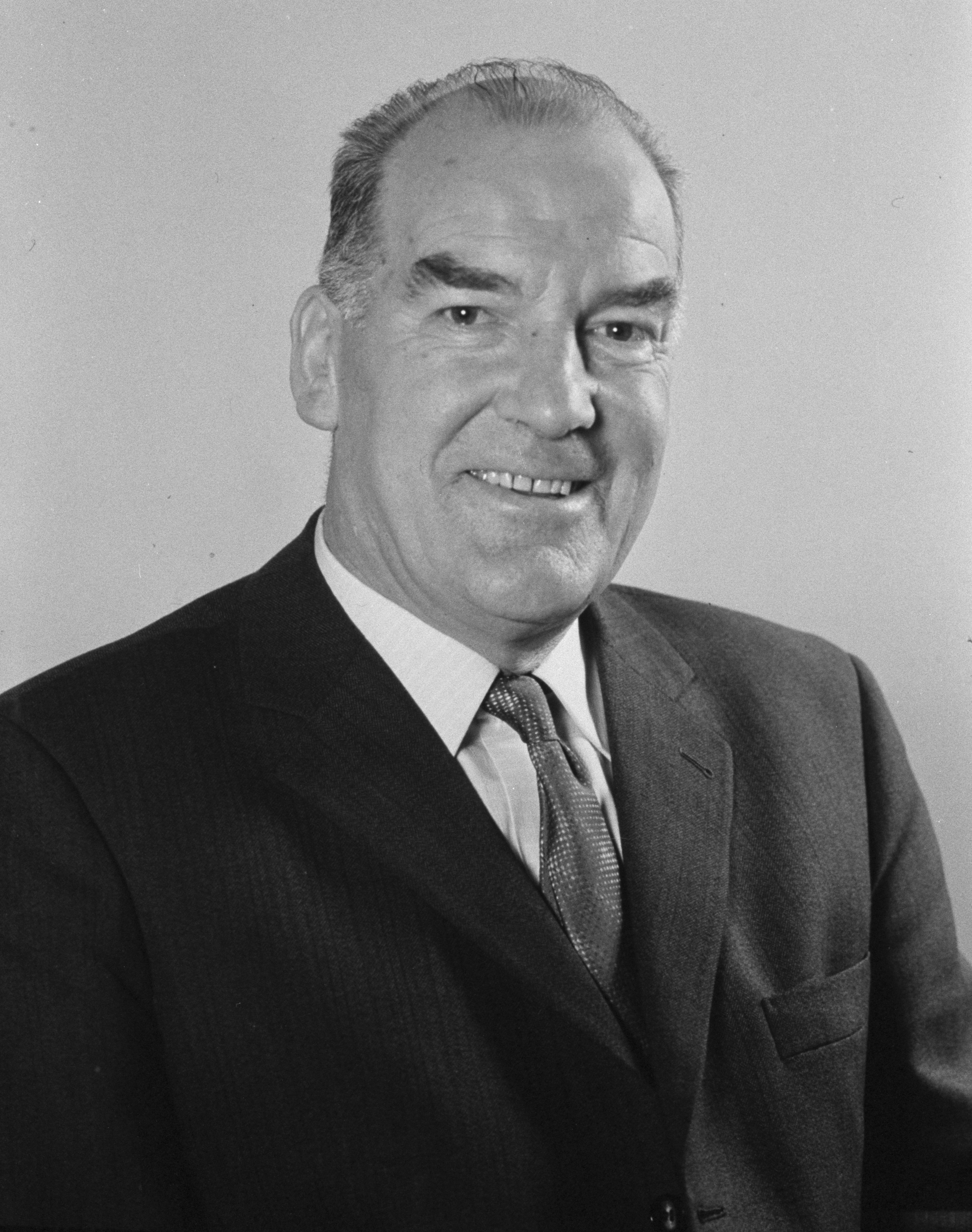
- Gnägi in 1971

Member of the Federal Council
- In office 1966–1979

President of the Swiss Confederation
- In office 1 January 1971 – 31 December 1971
- Preceded by: Hans-Peter Tschudi
- Succeeded by: Nello Celio
- In office 1 January 1976 – 31 December 1976
- Preceded by: Pierre Graber
- Succeeded by: Kurt Furgler

Personal details
- Born: 3 August 1917 Schwadernau, Canton of Bern
- Died: 20 April 1985 (aged 67) Köniz

Rudolf Gnägi (3 August 1917 – 20 April 1985) was a Swiss politician who was President of the Swiss Confederation in 1971 and 1976 and a member of the Swiss Federal Council from 1966 to 1979.

== Career ==
He was elected to the Federal Council of Switzerland on 8 December 1965 and handed over office on 31 December 1979. He was affiliated to the Party of Farmers, Traders and Independents (BGB/PAI), which became the Swiss People's Party in 1972.

During his office time he held the following departments: Federal Department of Transport, Communications and Energy (1966–1967), Federal Military Department (1968), Federal Department of Transport, Communications and Energy (1968), and Federal Military Department (1969–1979).

He was President of the Swiss Confederation twice in 1971 and 1976.

His name is popularly remembered as the nickname of a Swiss Armed Forces ordonnance item, an olive-green jumper officially named Trikothemd 75, but commonly known as Gnägi.

| Preceded by Friedrich Traugott Wahlen | Member of the Swiss Federal Council; 1966–1979 | Succeeded by Leon Schlumpf |
