= Hermann Obrecht =

Swiss politician (1882-1940)

Hermann Obrecht (26 March 1882 in Grenchen – 21 August 1940) was a Swiss politician and member of the Swiss Federal Council (1935–1940).

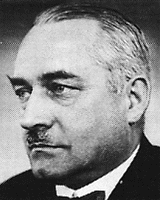
Hermann Obrecht, radical democrat

He was elected to the Swiss Federal Council on 4 April 1935 and handed over office on 31 July 1940. He was affiliated to the Radical Democratic Party. During his time in office he headed up the Federal Department of Economic Affairs.

| Preceded by Edmund Schulthess | Member of the Swiss Federal Council; 1935–1940 | Succeeded by Walther Stampfli |
