= Ernst Nobs =

Swiss politician

Ernst Nobs (14 July 1886, in Seedorf, Bern – 13 March 1957) was a Swiss politician.

Nobs was involved in the 1918 Swiss general strike. In 1919, a military court found him guilty of publishing subversive texts and sentenced him to four weeks in prison.

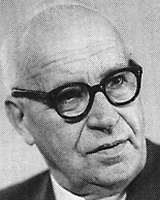
Ernst Nobs

He was the mayor of Zürich from 1942 to 1944. He was elected to the Swiss Federal Council on 15 December 1943, as the first member of the Social Democratic Party. He handed over office on 31 December 1951.

During his time in office he was responsible for the Department of Finance and he was President of the Confederation in 1949.

Preceded by Ernst Wetter	Member of the Swiss Federal Council; 1943–1951	Succeeded by Max Weber
