= Enrico Celio =

Swiss politician (1889–1980)

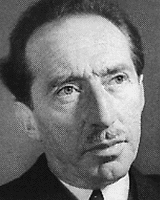

President of Switzerland
- In office 1 January 1948 – 31 December 1948
- Preceded by: Philipp Etter
- Succeeded by: Ernst Nobs
- In office 1 January 1943 – 31 December 1943
- Preceded by: Philipp Etter
- Succeeded by: Walther Stampfli

Swiss Federal Councillor
- In office 22 February 1940 – 15 October 1950
- Department: Posts and Railways
- Preceded by: Giuseppe Motta
- Succeeded by: Josef Escher

Personal details
- Born: 19 June 1889 Ambrì, Ticino, Switzerland
- Died: 23 February 1980 (aged 90) Lugano, Ticino, Switzerland
- Political party: Christian Democratic People's Party

Enrico Celio (19 June 1889 – 23 February 1980) was a Swiss politician who served as a Federal Councillor between 22 February 1940 and his resignation on 15 October 1950. He was affiliated to the Christian Democratic People's Party of Switzerland.

During his office time he held the Department of Posts and Railways and was President of the Confederation twice in 1943 and 1948.

== Biography ==
Enrico Celio was born in Ambrì, a hamlet of Quinto, as the second son of Emilio Celio, a school inspector and of Maria Danzi. He attended the Salesian gymnasium in Balerna and received his high school diploma at the Jesuits in Milan. He graduated in literature and philosophy at the University of Fribourg in 1915. From 1916 to 1921 he was a journalist and then director of the newspaper of the Ticino conservative party People and Freedom. In 1921 he resumed his studies in law at Fribourg, earning a licensed attorney. He was a member of the Grand Council of Ticino in the ranks of the conservative party from 1913 to 1932.

He was elected to the National Council in 1924 from 1927 to 1928 and in 1932. In 1932 he succeeded Giuseppe Cattori in the Ticino State Council where he took the lead of the Department of Public Education and Justice and Police.

In February 1940 he was elected to the Federal Council of Switzerland to replace Giuseppe Motta where he held the Federal Department of Post and Railways for ten years. On two occasions he was President of the Swiss Confederation in 1943 and in 1948.

He officially opened the 1948 Winter Olympics.

== Works ==
- Enrico Celio, An example of life: Giuseppe Motta, Istituto Editoriale Ticinese, Bellinzona 1957; Idem, The Leventine revolt of 1755, Grassi 6 Co, Bellinzona 1958.

== Bibliography ==
- Editorial, "Election to the Federal Council", in Popolo e Libertà of 22 February 1940.
- Eugen Teucher, Unsere Bundesräte seit 1848 in Bild und Wort , Basel 1944, 333–335.
- Giovanni Ferretti, Ad vocem , in Enciclopedia Italiana 1938-1948 , «Appendix II, A-H», Rome 1948, 550.
- Editorial Necrologio , in Corriere del Ticino of 25 February 1980.
- Alberto Lepori, Fabrizio Panzera (edited by), the Men our. Thirty biographies of politicians , Armando Dadò publisher, Locarno 1989, 98-102.
- Fabrizio Panzera, Enrico Celio , in Urs Altermatt (edited by), Die Schweizer Bundesräte: ein biographisches Lexikon , Artemis & Winkler, Zurich and Munich 1991.

Preceded by Giuseppe Motta	Member of the Swiss Federal Council; 1940–1950	Succeeded by Josef Escher
