= Nello Celio =

Swiss politician (1914–1995)

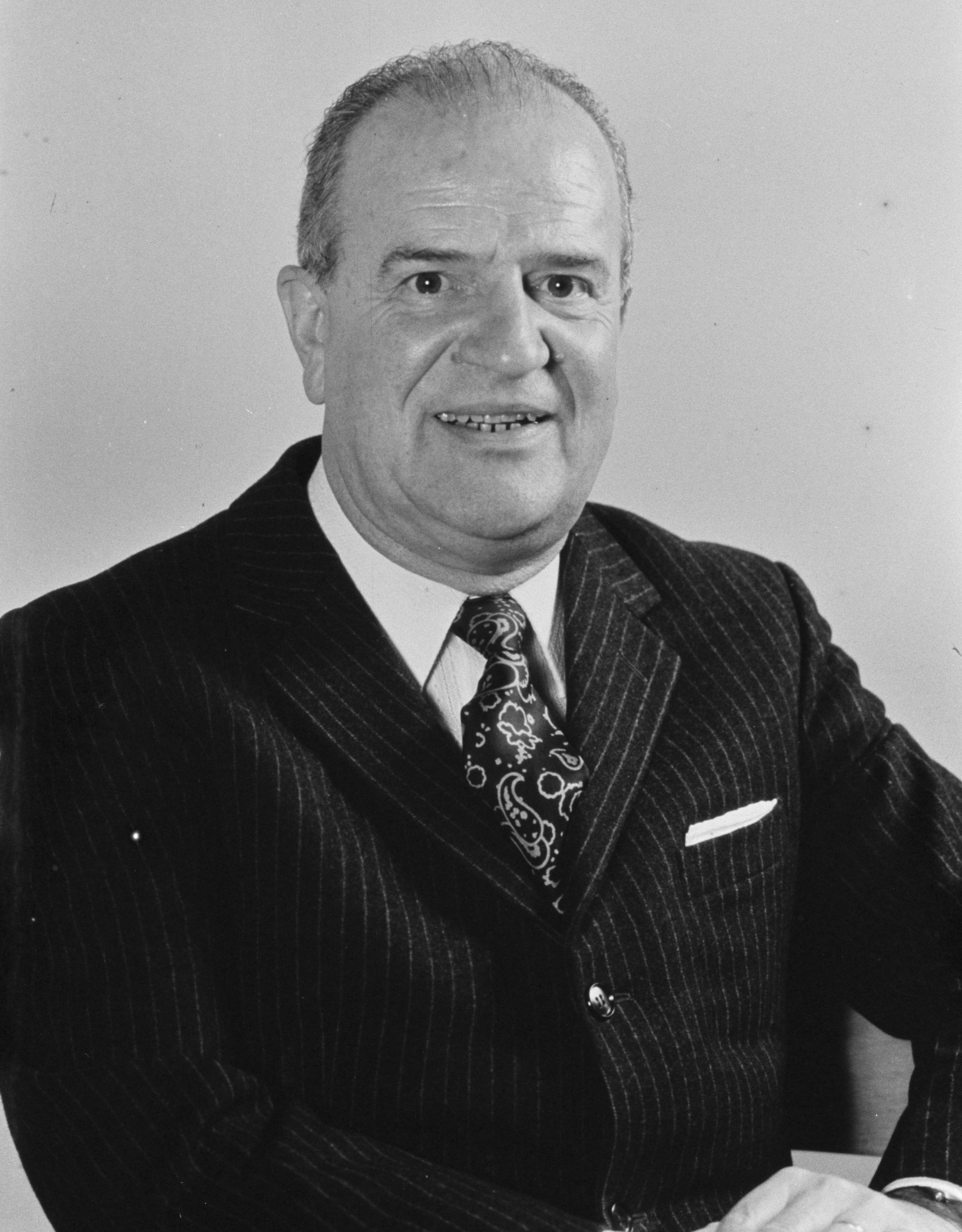
- Nello Celio

President of the Swiss Confederation
- In office 1 January 1972 – 31 December 1972
- Preceded by: Rudolf Gnägi
- Succeeded by: Roger Bonvin

Member of the Federal Council
- In office 1 January 1967 – 31 December 1972
- Preceded by: Paul Chaudet
- Succeeded by: Georges-André Chevallaz

Member of the National Council
- In office 2 December 1963 – 14 December 1966

Personal details
- Born: 12 February 1914 Quinto, Ticino, Switzerland
- Died: 29 December 1995 (aged 81) Bern Switzerland
- Education: University of Basel; University of Bern
- Occupation: Lawyer

Nello Celio (12 February 1914 – 29 December 1995) was a Swiss politician from the Canton of Ticino. He was a member of the Free Democratic Party. He was a member of the Federal Council from 1966 to 1973 and served as the President of the Swiss Confederation in 1972.

He held the rank of captain in the swiss army.

== Biography ==
Celio was born in Quinto, Ticino, Switzerland in 1914. He studied law at the University of Basel and the University of Bern. In 1944, he was appointed as a public prosecutor in the Sopraceneri area of Ticino. He became active in politics as the president of the Ticino FDP and entered elective office in 1946 as a member of the Council of State of Ticino. He served in that body until 1959.

In 1960, he became the party president of the FDP. He stood for the 1963 Swiss federal election for the National Council and was elected. After the Mirage Affair scandal, which resulted in the departure of Paul Chaudet from the Federal Council, Celio was elected to succeed him. He initially headed up the Military Department, which was vacant after Chaudet's departure. No other Federal Councilor at the time was willing to take over the ministry. In 1968, he took over the Department of Finance.

In 1971, he was the Vice President of Switzerland and in 1972, he served a single term as President of the Swiss Confederation. In 1973, he resigned from office.

Celio died on 29 December 1995 from pneumonia at the age of 81.

Preceded by Paul Chaudet	Member of the Swiss Federal Council; 1966–1973	Succeeded by Georges-André Chevallaz
Preceded by Rudolf Gnägi	Vice President of Switzerland; 1971	Succeeded by Roger Bonvin
Preceded by Rudolf Gnägi	President of Switzerland; 1972	Succeeded by Roger Bonvin
