= Pierre Graber =

Swiss politician (1908–2003)

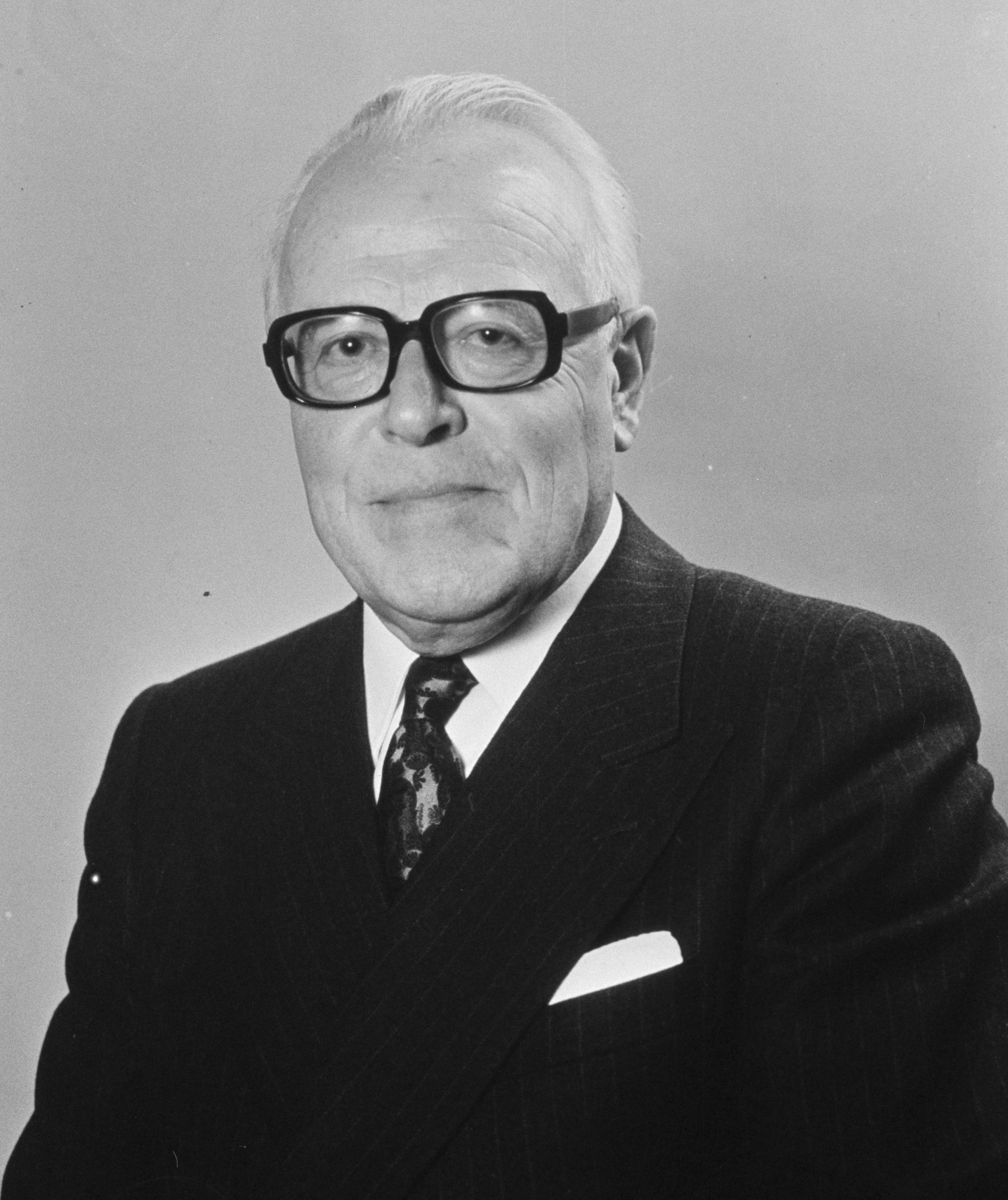
Pierre Graber (1971)

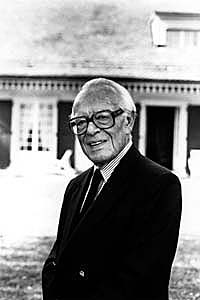
1989

Pierre Graber (6 December 1908 – 19 July 2003) was a Swiss politician and member of the Swiss Federal Council (1970–1978).

== Early life and education ==
He was born in La Chaux-de-Fonds, Switzerland and after studying law in Neuchâtel and Vienna he became attorney-at-law in Lausanne.

Graber had three previous marriages: in 1931 with Margarete Gawronsky (divorced in 1936), in 1939 with Lina Pierrette Meilland (fallen in 1974), and in 1977 with Renée Noverraz (of the Avilon family).

He retired in Savigny (Vaud) and later in Lausana, , expressed his opinion on important occasions, as the failure of Switzerland to join the UN in 1986.

== Political career ==
Active in the Social Democratic Party, he was in the municipal parliament of Lausanne (1934–1946), member of the parliament of the canton of Vaud (1937–1946), mayor of Lausanne (1946–1949), member of the National Council (1942–1969, except 1963), he was the Speaker of that Assembly from 1965/66, he sat in the Foreign affairs committee and was deputy chairman of the enquiry parliamentary committee dealing with the Mirage affair.

He was also a member of the government of the canton of Vaud (1962–1970) in charge of the Finance Department. He served as one of the four members of the Commission to resolve the problem of the Jura.

In 1970, the Swiss Disaster Relief Corps was established and it intervened in Africa for the first time in 1973. A new law on development cooperation was also drawn up during his term of office. In view of the criticism, however, he had to abandon his plan to hire the journalist Roger Nordmann (1919-1972) as the department's communications manager.

He was elected to the Swiss Federal Council on 10 December 1969. During his time in office, he headed the Political Department, i.e. ministry of foreign affairs. Graber was President of the Confederation in 1975 and handed over office on 31 January 1978. During his term of office, a new law for Cooperation Development was adopted.

He obtained the ratification by Parliament of the European Convention on Human Rights in 1974. As president of the Committee of Ministers of the Council of Europe, he laid the first stone of the Palace of Europe in Strasbourg on 15 May 1972.

On 1 August 1975, he signed the Helsinki Final Act of the CSCE on behalf of Switzerland. At his initiative, Switzerland recognized North Vietnam and North Korea. Graber presided over the diplomatic conference that led to the adoption of the additional protocols to the Geneva Conventions in 1977.

He faced the first terrorist attack on a Swissair plane in Zarqa, Jordan by members of the Popular Front for the Liberation of Palestine (PFLP) in 1970. In this context, Graber was alleged, by NZZ Journalist Marcel Gyr (in his 2016 book titled Schweizer Terrorjahre: Das geheime Abkommen mit der PLO) to have made contact, through Jean Ziegler and without the knowledge of the other members of the Federal Council, with the head of foreign policy of the Palestine Liberation Organization (PLO), Farouk Kaddoumi. An unofficial agreement, of which the other members of the Swiss government were not informed, was apparently reached. According to the terms of this agreement, Switzerland would remain spared from Palestinian terrorism but would in return support the PLO in its efforts to gain diplomatic recognition at the United Nations headquarters in Geneva and would further agree not to file a criminal complaint against Palestinian suspects in the attack on Swissair Flight 330 in Würenlingen. However, in a 2016 inquiry, the Swiss parliament found no evidence of such a deal ever being agreed upon. Fritz Blankart, who served as Swiss State Secretary in 1970, also rejected the existence of such a deal. Swiss historians Sacha Zala, Thomas Bürgisser and Yves Steiner, published an article in the Swiss Journal of History calling the existence of the deal "highly implausible".

After retiring, he gave his opinion on major occasions including Switzerland's unsuccessful attempt to join the United Nations in 1986.

== Death ==
Graber died of a stroke in Lausanne in 2003 at the age of 94.

== Bibliography ==
- Pierre Graber: Mémoires et réflexions; Lausanne: Editions 24 heures, 1992; ISBN 2-8265-1096-7 — autobiography.

Political offices
Preceded by Franz Josef Kurmann	President of the Swiss National Council; 1964/1965	Succeeded by Alfred Schaller
Preceded by Willy Spühler	Member of the Swiss Federal Council; 1970–1978	Succeeded by Pierre Aubert
