= Johannes Baumann =

Swiss politician (1874–1953)

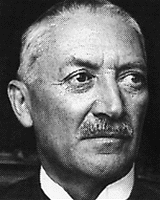

President of Switzerland
- In office 1 January 1938 – 31 December 1938
- Preceded by: Giuseppe Motta
- Succeeded by: Philipp Etter

Swiss Federal Councillor
- In office 22 March 1934 – 31 December 1940
- Department: Justice and Police
- Preceded by: Heinrich Häberlin
- Succeeded by: Karl Kobelt

Personal details
- Born: 27 November 1874 Herisau, Appenzell Ausserrhoden, Switzerland
- Died: 8 September 1953 (aged 78)
- Party: Free Democratic Party

Johannes Baumann (27 November 1874 – 8 September 1953) was a Swiss politician who was a Swiss Federal Councillor from 1934 to 1940.

He was elected to the Federal Council on 22 March 1934 and handed over office on 31 December 1940. He was affiliated with the Free Democratic Party.

During his office time he held the Federal Department of Justice and Police and was President of the Confederation in 1938.

Preceded by Auguste Pettavel	President of the Swiss Council of States; 1920/1921	Succeeded by Josef Räber
Preceded by Heinrich Häberlin	Member of the Swiss Federal Council; 1934–1940	Succeeded by Karl Kobelt
