= Walther Stampfli =

Swiss politician (1884-1965)

Member of the Swiss Federal Council
- In office 17 December 1940 – 31 December 1947
- Preceded by: Ernst Wetter
- Succeeded by: Eduard von Steiger

Personal details
- Born: 22 June 1884 Büren, Solothurn, Switzerland
- Died: 25 February 1965 (aged 80) Bern, Switzerland
- Party: Free Democratic Party of Switzerland

Walther Stampfli (3 December 1884 – 11 October 1965) was a Swiss politician and member of the Swiss Federal Council (1940–1947).

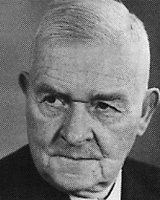
Walther Stampfli

He was elected to the Federal Council on 18 July 1940 and handed over office on 31 December 1947. He was affiliated to the Free Democratic Party (FDP/PRD).

During his time in office he was in charge of the Federal Department of Economic Affairs and was President of the Confederation in 1944.

Between 1921 and 1940, he worked in the management of Ludwig von Rollschen Eisenwerke. In 1922, he presided the parliament of the Canton of Solothurn. Between 1930 and 1940, Stampfli was a member of the Swiss National Council.

Stampfli was a citizen of Aeschi.

Preceded by Hermann Obrecht	Member of the Swiss Federal Council; 1940–1947	Succeeded by Rodolphe Rubattel
