= Karl Kobelt =

Swiss politician (1891–1968)

Karl Kobelt (1 August 1891, in St. Gallen – 5 January 1968) was a Swiss politician and member of the Swiss Federal Council.

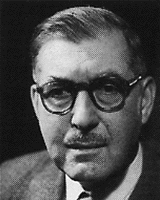
Karl Kobelt

He was elected to the Federal Council on 10 December 1940 and handed over office on 31 December 1954. He was affiliated to the Free Democratic Party.

During his time in office he held the Military Department. On 2 December 1944 Kobelt contacted Brigadier General B. R. Legge related to internees, among others in the Wauwilermoos internment camp near Luzern. Kobelt was President of the Confederation twice in 1946 and 1952.

Preceded by Johannes Baumann	Member of the Swiss Federal Council; 1940–1954	Succeeded by Giuseppe Lepori
