= Roger Bonvin =

Swiss politician

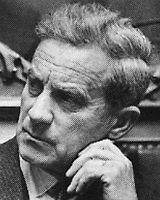
Roger Bonvin

Roger Bonvin (12 September 1907, in Icogne, Valais – 5 June 1982) was a Swiss politician and member of the Swiss Federal Council (1962–1973).

Bonvin was mayor of Sion from 1955 to 1962.

He was elected to the Federal Council of Switzerland on 27 September 1962 and handed over office on 31 December 1973. He was affiliated to the Christian Democratic People's Party of Switzerland.

During his office time he held the following departments:

- Department of Finance (1962–1968)
- Department of Transport, Communications and Energy (1968–1973)

He was President of the Confederation twice, in 1967 and 1973.

There is a place Roger-Bonvin at Icogne named for him.

| Preceded by Jean Bourgknecht | Member of the Swiss Federal Council; 1962–1973 | Succeeded by Hans Hürlimann |
