= Jules Rimet =

French football administrator (1873–1956)

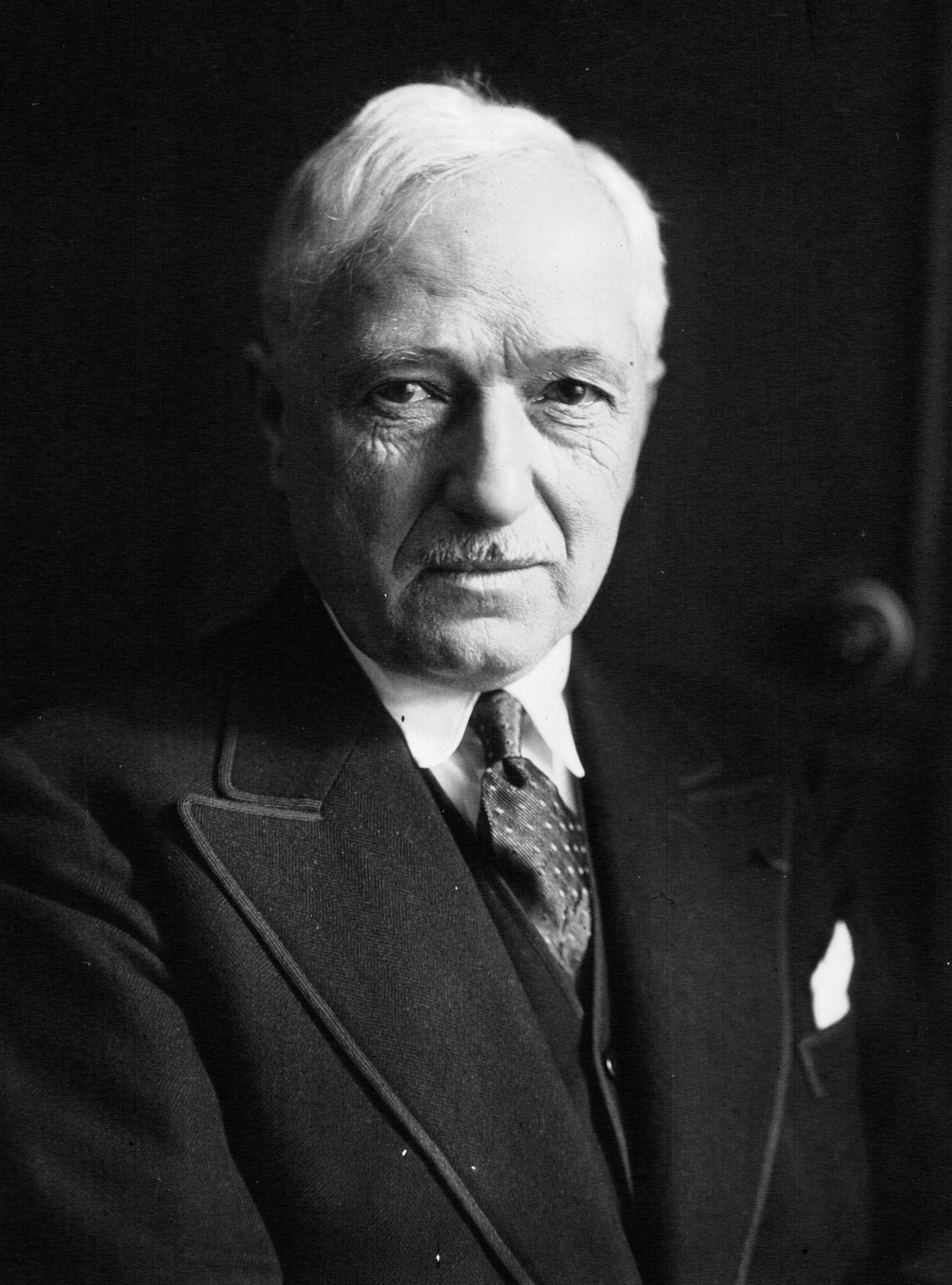
- Rimet in 1933

3rd President of FIFA
- In office 1 March 1921 – 21 June 1954
- Preceded by: Daniel Burley Woolfall
- Succeeded by: Rodolphe William Seeldrayers

President of FFF
- In office 1919–1942
- Succeeded by: Henri Jevain
- In office 1944–1949
- Preceded by: Henri Jevain
- Succeeded by: Emmanuel Gambardella

Personal details
- Born: Jules Ernest Séraphin Valentin Rimet; 14 October 1873 Theuley, Haute-Saône, France
- Died: 16 October 1956 (aged 83) Suresnes, Seine, France
- Profession: Football administrator
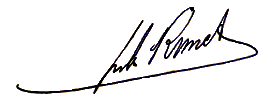
- Signature

Jules Ernest Séraphin Valentin Rimet (French: [ʒyl ʁimɛ]; 14 October 1873 – 16 October 1956) was a French football administrator who was the 3rd president of FIFA, serving from 1921 to 1954. He is FIFA's longest-serving president, in office for 33 years. He also served as the president of the French Football Federation from 1919 to 1942, and again from 1944 to 1949.

On Rimet's initiative, the first FIFA World Cup was held in 1930. The Jules Rimet Trophy was named in his honour. He also founded French club Red Star, known as Red Star Club Français upon its creation in 1897.

== Early life ==
Jules Ernest Séraphin Valentin Rimet was born on 14 October 1873 in the commune of Theuley, in the department of Haute-Saône in eastern France. His father was a grocer, and the family moved to Paris in 1884 when Jules was eleven years old. He became a lawyer, and in 1897 he started a sports club called Red Star which, due to Rimet's ideals, did not discriminate against its members on the basis of class. One of the sports played at the club was football, which was becoming popular. When Rimet was 17, Pope Leo XIII released his encyclical on the dignity of work, Rerum novarum, which would have a profound effect on the young Catholic Rimet, and sparked his efforts to promote these views.

== Football and FIFA ==
Rimet was involved in the founding of the Fédération Internationale de Football Association (International Federation of Association Football, commonly abbreviated to FIFA) in 1904, and, while the fledgling organisation had plans for a global professional tournament, it instead was involved in running an amateur tournament as part of the 1908 Summer Olympics.

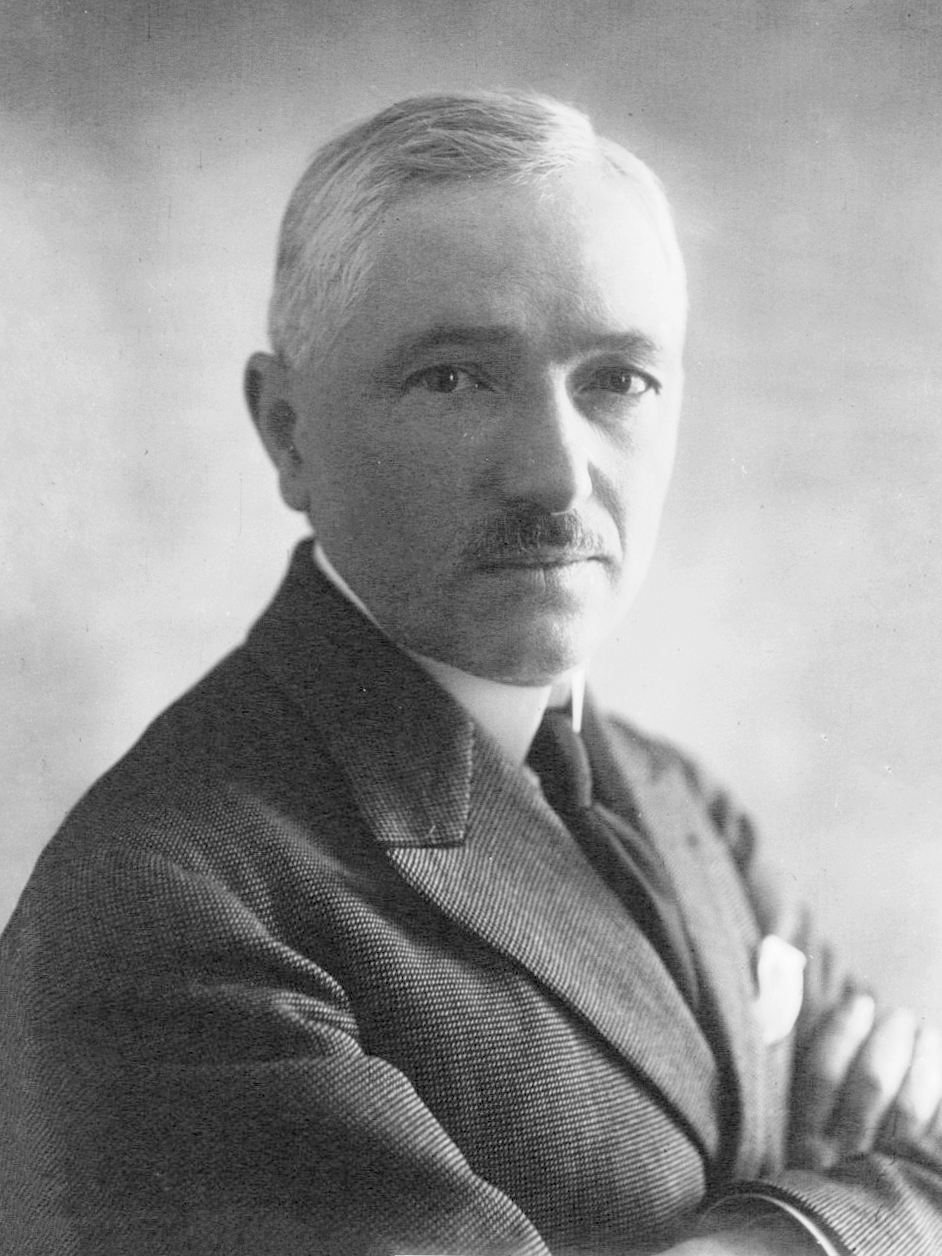
Jules Rimet in 1920.

The First World War put Rimet's and FIFA's plans on hold. Rimet served in the French Army as an officer and was decorated with a Croix de Guerre.

Following the war in 1919, he became President of the French Football Federation, and then President of FIFA on 1 March 1921. He would hold the post until 1954 becoming the longest reigning President to date, taking the membership of the organisation from twelve up to 85 nations, despite losing the membership of the English, Welsh and Scottish Football Associations during the early years. After taking up the post he moved once again to start a global tournament, but was opposed by the amateur football associations and Pierre de Coubertin, founder of the International Olympic Committee.

=== The World Cup ===
In 1928 FIFA, under Rimet's leadership, went forward with plans for a "World Cup" which was held in Uruguay due to the nature of the professional game in South America, and in part because the Uruguayan Football Association offered to pay all travel costs. Rimet travelled to Uruguay for the World Cup on SS Conte Verde along with the competing European teams, all the while carrying the trophy in his bag.

However Rimet's decisions on where to host the first few World Cups led to criticism: European nations complained about the 1930 World Cup because players would be out of domestic tournaments for three months. This was the key reason why, of the European nations, only four (France, Belgium, Romania and Yugoslavia) accepted invitations to send teams to compete, and even then, they only did so because of Rimet's influence. The following World Cup was held in Italy under the Fascist rule of Benito Mussolini, which was used to promote the regime, something that Rimet was accused of supporting.

Following the Second World War, the British football associations agreed to take part from the 1950 FIFA World Cup onwards, where Rimet himself handed over the trophy to the triumphant Uruguayan team when Uruguay won the tournament for the second time. Rimet's efforts in establishing the tournament earned him a nomination for the Nobel Peace Prize in 1956.

== Later life and legacy ==
Rimet died in Suresnes, Seine, in 1956, two days after his 83rd birthday. In 2004, he was posthumously made a member of the FIFA Order of Merit, which was collected by his grandson Yves Rimet. He is credited with being the inventor of the World Cup.

The original World Cup trophy was named the Jules Rimet Trophy in his honour. It was stolen just prior to the 1966 World Cup in England, but was found by the dog Pickles. Brazil won the tournament for the third time at the 1970 World Cup, and were awarded the trophy permanently. It was stolen again, in Rio de Janeiro in 1983; while it is believed to have been melted down by the thieves, there is no conclusive proof of this. The Brazilian Football Confederation subsequently had a replica of the trophy made. Rumours of the various disappearances of the trophy, and its final resting place, still persist. A statue of Rimet stands in Theuley in the middle of a penalty box, complete with goal.

Rimet was portrayed by Academy Award-nominated French actor Gérard Depardieu in the 2014 biographical drama United Passions.
