= Theft of the Jules Rimet Trophy =

The Jules Rimet Trophy has been stolen twice:

- 1966 theft of the Jules Rimet Trophy
- 1983 theft of the Jules Rimet Trophy
