= UEFA Europa League =

European annual club football competition

- Organiser(s): UEFA
- Founded: 1971; 55 years ago (rebranded in 2009)
- Region: Europe
- Teams: 36 (league phase); 58 (total)
- Qualifier for: UEFA Super Cup; UEFA Champions League
- Related competitions: UEFA Champions League (1st tier); UEFA Conference League (3rd tier)
- Current champions: (England) Aston Villa (1st title)
- Most championships: (Spain) Sevilla (7 titles)
- Website: www.uefa.com/uefaeuropaleague
- 2026–27 UEFA Europa League

The UEFA Europa League (UEL), known simply as the Europa League, is an annual club football competition organised since 1971 by the Union of European Football Associations (UEFA) for eligible European clubs. It is the second-tier competition of European club football, ranking below the UEFA Champions League and above the UEFA Conference League.

Introduced in 1971 as the UEFA Cup, it replaced the Inter-Cities Fairs Cup. A group stage was added ahead of the knockout phase in the 2004–05 season. The competition took its current name in 2009, following a format change that included a merger with the UEFA Intertoto Cup, expanding the group stage and altering qualification. In 2024–25, the group stage was replaced by a 36-team league phase.

Winners of the UEFA Europa League qualify for the following season's UEFA Super Cup and UEFA Champions League. They have also occasionally played matches against the winners of the CONMEBOL Copa Sudamericana in the UEFA–CONMEBOL Club Challenge, most recently in 2023.

The competition has been won by 31 clubs and 14 of them have won it more than once. Clubs from Spain have the most wins, with 14, followed by England with 11, Italy with 10 and Germany with 7. The most successful club in the competition is Sevilla, with seven titles. Aston Villa are the current holders, having beaten SC Freiburg 3–0 in the 2026 final.

== History ==
Winners UEFA Cup / UEFA Europa League
Season	Winners
UEFA Cup
1971–72	(England) Tottenham Hotspur
1972–73	(England) Liverpool
1973–74	(Netherlands) Feyenoord
1974–75	(Germany) Borussia Mönchengladbach
1975–76	(England) Liverpool (2)
1976–77	(Italy) Juventus
1977–78	(Netherlands) PSV Eindhoven
1978–79	(Germany) Borussia Mönchengladbach (2)
1979–80	(Germany) Eintracht Frankfurt
1980–81	(England) Ipswich Town
1981–82	(Sweden) IFK Göteborg
1982–83	(Belgium) Anderlecht
1983–84	(England) Tottenham Hotspur (2)
1984–85	(Spain) Real Madrid
1985–86	(Spain) Real Madrid (2)
1986–87	(Sweden) IFK Göteborg (2)
1987–88	(Germany) Bayer Leverkusen
1988–89	(Italy) Napoli
1989–90	(Italy) Juventus (2)
1990–91	(Italy) Inter Milan
1991–92	(Netherlands) Ajax
1992–93	(Italy) Juventus (3)
1993–94	(Italy) Inter Milan (2)
1994–95	(Italy) Parma
1995–96	(Germany) Bayern Munich
1996–97	(Germany) Schalke 04
1997–98	(Italy) Inter Milan (3)
1998–99	(Italy) Parma (2)
1999–2000	(Turkey) Galatasaray
2000–01	(England) Liverpool (3)
2001–02	(Netherlands) Feyenoord (2)
2002–03	(Portugal) Porto
2003–04	(Spain) Valencia
2004–05	(Russia) CSKA Moscow
2005–06	(Spain) Sevilla
2006–07	(Spain) Sevilla (2)
2007–08	(Russia) Zenit Saint Petersburg
2008–09	(Ukraine) Shakhtar Donetsk
UEFA Europa League
2009–10	(Spain) Atlético Madrid
2010–11	(Portugal) Porto (2)
2011–12	(Spain) Atlético Madrid (2)
2012–13	(England) Chelsea
2013–14	(Spain) Sevilla (3)
2014–15	(Spain) Sevilla (4)
2015–16	(Spain) Sevilla (5)
2016–17	(England) Manchester United
2017–18	(Spain) Atlético Madrid (3)
2018–19	(England) Chelsea (2)
2019–20	(Spain) Sevilla (6)
2020–21	(Spain) Villarreal
2021–22	(Germany) Eintracht Frankfurt (2)
2022–23	(Spain) Sevilla (7)
2023–24	(Italy) Atalanta
2024–25	(England) Tottenham Hotspur (3)
2025–26	(England) Aston Villa

The UEFA Cup was preceded by the Inter-Cities Fairs Cup, which was a European football competition played between 1955 and 1971. The competition grew from 11 teams during the first edition (1955–58) to 64 teams by the last edition which was played in 1970–71. It was replaced by the UEFA Cup, a new seasonal confederation competition with different regulations, format and disciplinary committee. In 2009, UEFA observed that while the Fairs Cup was "very successful ... the time came when the UEFA Executive Committee thought that such a major competition should be governed and organised by UEFA itself, which could ensure that standard rules were followed and could deal with refereeing and disciplinary matters". Since that time, the UEFA Cup "steadily became more prestigious".

The UEFA Cup was first played in the 1971–72 season, ending with an all-English final between Wolverhampton Wanderers and Tottenham Hotspur, with Spurs lifting the cup. In 1973 another English club, Liverpool, defeated Borussia Mönchengladbach in the final. Gladbach won the competition in 1975 and 1979, and reached the final in 1980. Feyenoord won the cup in 1974 after defeating Tottenham Hotspur 4–2 on aggregate (2–2 in London, 2–0 in Rotterdam). Liverpool won the competition for the second time in 1976 after defeating Club Brugge in the final.

During the 1980s, IFK Göteborg (1982 and 1987) and Real Madrid (1985 and 1986) won the competition twice each, with Anderlecht reaching two consecutive finals, winning in 1983 and losing to Tottenham Hotspur in 1984. 1989 saw the commencement of the Italian clubs' domination, when Diego Maradona's Napoli defeated VfB Stuttgart. The 1990s started with two all-Italian finals, and in 1992, Torino lost the final to Ajax on the away goals rule. Juventus won the competition for a third time in 1993. Inter Milan kept the cup in Italy in 1994.

1995 saw a third all-Italian final, with Parma proving their consistency after two consecutive Cup Winners' Cup finals. The only final with no Italians in the 1990s was in 1996. Internazionale reached the final the following two years, losing in 1997 to Schalke 04 on penalties, and winning another all-Italian final in 1998, taking home the cup for the third time in only eight years. Parma won the cup in 1999, the last win of the Italian-domination era. It was the last UEFA Cup/Europa League final appearance for any Italian club until Internazionale reached the 2020 final.

Since the first edition of the competition in 1971 four teams have qualified from the top leagues and then three, two or one from the lower-ranked national leagues. Qualitatively, the teams that qualified for the competition from 1971 to 1995 were usually those ranked from the second place to third, fourth or fifth place in their national league, with the exception of the teams that had won the domestic Cup in the previous season who choose to play the UEFA Cup Winners' Cup.

From 1996 more than one team per nation has been allowed to participate in UEFA Champions League: two teams from 1996, four from 1999 in the top leagues; the clubs that qualified from 1999 onwards in UEFA Cup were those ranked from fifth or sixth position to seventh or eight position, significantly reducing the quality and the prestige of the competition in favour of the UEFA Champions League.

From 1994–95 clubs eliminated from the UEFA Champions League in its third qualifying round were fed into the UEFA Cup, and from 1999–2000 this was extended to include the team finishing third in their section in the UEFA Champions League group stage (this rule will last until the end of 2023–24 season: in 25 years 9 teams that won the competition was coming from the elimination as third place in their UCL group-stage).

The UEFA Cup Winners' Cup competition was absorbed by UEFA Cup since 1998–99 season.

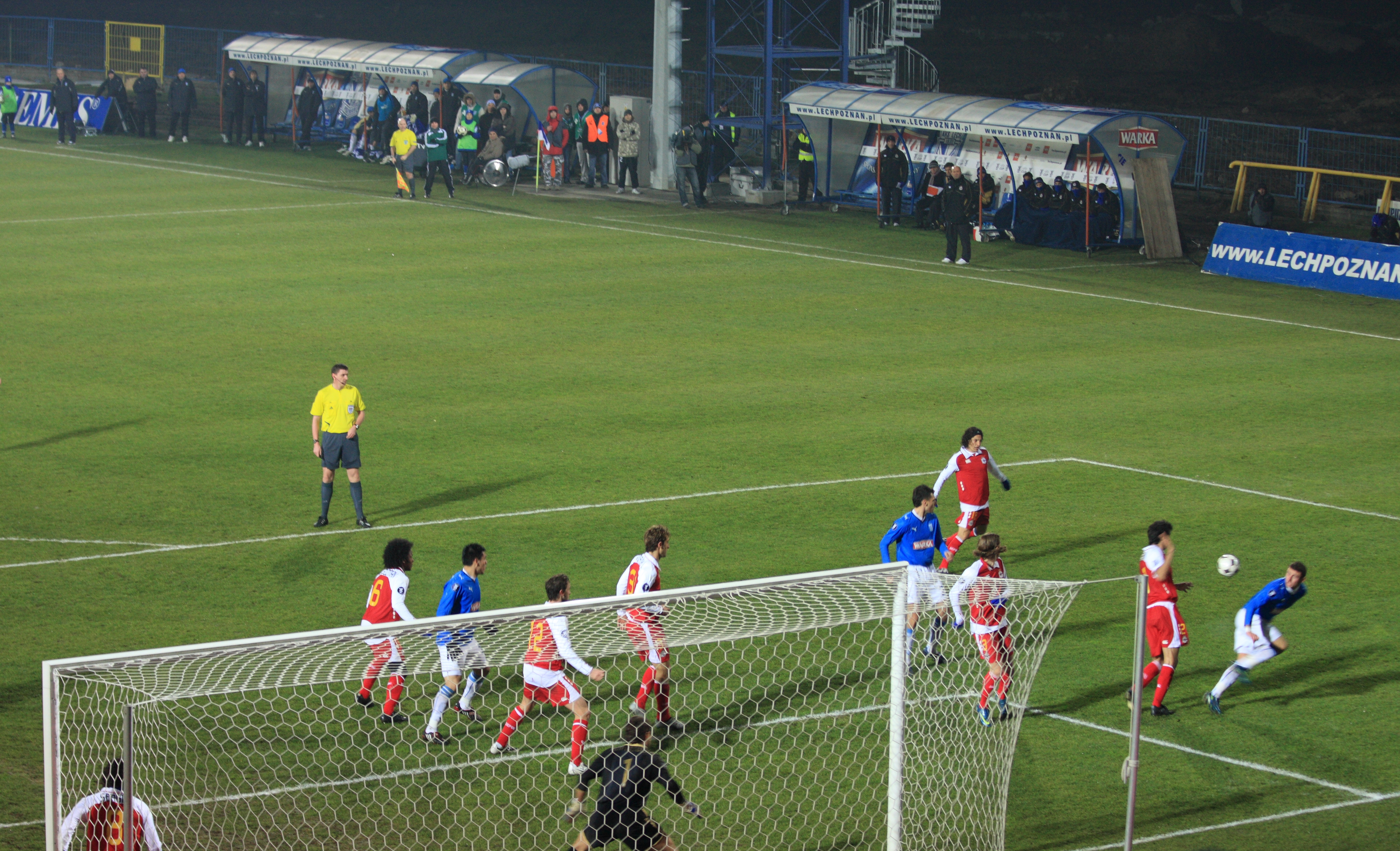
The match between Lech Poznań and Deportivo La Coruña in the 2008–09 season.

The era of the 2000s began with victory for Galatasaray, the first team to lift the trophy having begun the season in the UEFA Champions League and the First Turkish team to win the trophy, defeating Arsenal. Liverpool won the competition for the third time in 2001. In 2002, Feyenoord became winners for the second time, defeating Borussia Dortmund. Porto triumphed in the 2003 and 2011 tournaments, with the latter victory against fellow Portuguese side Braga.

In 2004, the cup returned to Spain with Valencia being victorious. CSKA Moscow won in 2005. Sevilla succeeded on two consecutive occasions in 2006 and 2007, the latter in a final against fellow Spaniards Espanyol. Zenit Saint Petersburg won in 2008, defeating fellow finalists Rangers. Ukraine's Shakhtar Donetsk, won in 2009, the first Ukrainian side to do so.

Since the 2009–10 season, the competition was rebranded as the UEFA Europa League. At the same time, the UEFA Intertoto Cup, UEFA's third-tier competition, was discontinued and merged into the new Europa League.

Atlético Madrid won twice in three seasons, in 2010 and 2012, the latter in another all-Spanish final between them and Athletic Bilbao. In 2013, Chelsea became the first Champions League holders to win the UEFA Cup/Europa League the following year. In 2014, Sevilla won their third cup in eight years after defeating Benfica on penalties. In 2015, Sevilla won their fourth UEFA Cup/Europa League and, in an unprecedented feat, they defended their title a third year in a row beating Liverpool in the 2016 final, making them the most successful team in the history of the competition with five titles. Atlético won their third title in 2018. The 2019 all-London final between Chelsea and Arsenal was the first UEFA Cup/Europa League final between two teams from the same city. Sevilla added a record-extending sixth victory in 2020, after defeating Inter Milan, and won an unprecedented seventh title in 2023. Sevilla and Tottenham Hotspur are the only clubs to have won the competition in three different decades.

== Trophy ==
The UEFA Cup, also known as the Coupe UEFA, is the trophy awarded annually by UEFA to the football club that wins the UEFA Europa League. Before the 2009–10 season, both the competition and the trophy were known as the 'UEFA Cup'.

Before the competition was renamed the UEFA Europa League in the 2009–10 season, the UEFA regulations stated that a club could keep the original trophy for a year before returning it to UEFA. After its return, the club could keep a four-fifths scale replica of the original trophy. Upon their third consecutive win or fifth win overall, a club could retain the trophy permanently.

Under the new regulations, the trophy remains in UEFA's keeping at all times. A full-size replica trophy is awarded to each winner of the competition. A club that wins three consecutive times or five times overall will receive a multiple-winner badge. As of 2016–17, only Sevilla has earned the honour to wear the multiple-winner badge, having achieved both of the prerequisites in 2016.

The trophy was designed and crafted by Silvio Gazzaniga, who also designed the FIFA World Cup Trophy, working for Bertoni, for the 1972 UEFA Cup Final. It weighs 15 kg (33 lb) and is silver on a yellow marble plinth. 67 centimetres (26 in) tall, the cup is formed by a base with two onyx discs in which a band with the flags of the UEFA member nations is inserted. The lower part of the sculpture symbolises the stylised footballers and is surmounted by a hand-embossed slab.

== Anthem ==
A musical theme for the competition, the Anthem, is played before every Europa League game at a stadium hosting such an event and before every television broadcast of a Europa League game as a musical element of the competition's opening sequence. It is also played when the winning team lifts the trophy after the final.

The competition's first anthem was composed by Yohann Zveig and recorded by the Paris Opera in early 2009. The theme for the re-branded UEFA Cup competition was first officially unveiled at the Grimaldi Forum on 28 August 2009 before the 2009–10 season group stage draw. A new anthem was composed by Michael Kadelbach and recorded in Berlin and was launched as part of the competition's rebranding at the start of the 2015–16 season.

A new anthem created by MassiveMusic was composed for the start of the 2018–19 season. It is also used for UEFA Conference League matches.

== Format ==
=== Qualification ===
Qualification for the competition is based on UEFA coefficients, with better entrance rounds being offered to the more successful nations. In practice, each association has a standard number of three berths (across both the Europa League and the Conference League), except:

- Nations ranked 51 to 55, which have two berths
- Liechtenstein, which qualifies only the Cup winners

Usually, each country's places are awarded to teams who finish in various runners-up places in its top-flight league and the winner of the main cup competition. Typically the teams qualifying via the league are those in the highest places not eligible for the UEFA Champions League; however, the Belgian league awards one place via a playoff between First A and First B teams. Before its discontinuation in 2020–21, France offered a place to the winners of the Coupe de la Ligue.

A team may qualify for European competitions through more than one route. In all cases, if a club is eligible to enter the UEFA Champions League then the Champions League place takes precedence and the club does not enter the UEFA Europa League. The UEFA Europa League place is then granted to another club or vacated if the maximum limit of teams qualifying for European competitions is exceeded. If a team qualifies for European competition through both winning a cup and league placing, the "spare" UEFA Europa League place will go to the highest placed league team which has not already qualified for European competition, depending on the rules of the national association, or vacated, if the described limit is reached.

The top three ranked associations may qualify for a fourth berth if both the Champions League and Europa League champions are from that association and do not qualify for European competition through their domestic performance. In that case, the fourth-placed team in that association will join the Europa League instead of the Champions League, in addition to their other qualifying teams.

More recently, clubs that are knocked out of the qualifying round and (prior to 2024–25) the group stage of the Champions League can also join the UEFA Europa League, at different stages (see below). Formerly, the reigning champions qualified for the Europa League to defend their title, but since 2015 they qualify for the Champions League. From the 2024–25 season, the winner of the Europa League can no longer defend their title as they automatically qualify for the Champions League league phase and teams cannot be transferred from that phase to the Europa League. From 1995 to 2015, three leagues gained one extra place via the UEFA Respect Fair Play ranking.

=== League phase and knockout phase ===
The format involves a league phase and a knockout phase consisting of preliminary knockout play-offs, followed by a round of 16, quarter-finals, semi-finals and final (all of the knockout games except the final are played over two legs). The league phase consists of each team playing a total of eight matches, with four at home and four away. The top eight teams from the league phase receive a bye to the round of 16, while the teams ranked 9th to 24th contest the knockout play-offs with the winners advancing to the round of 16. The teams ranked 25th to 36th in the league phase and the losers of the play-offs are eliminated from the competition.

The final is played at a neutral venue. The winner of the competition is entitled to participate in the UEFA Champions League league phase the following season. The competition's matches are usually played on Thursdays.

=== Background ===
UEFA coefficients were introduced in 1980 and, until 1999, they gave a greater number of berths in UEFA Cup to the more successful nations. Three nations had four places, five nations had three places, thirteen nations had two places, and eleven nations only one place. Since 1998, a similar system has been used for the UEFA Champions League. Before 1980, the entrance criteria of the last Fairs Cup was used.

=== Historical formats ===
The competition was traditionally a pure knockout tournament. All ties were two-legged, including the final. Starting with the 1997–98 season, the final became a one-off match, but all other ties remained two-legged.

Before the 2004–05 season, the tournament consisted of one qualifying round, followed by a series of knockout rounds. The sixteen non-qualifiers from the final qualifying round of the Champions League entered at the first round proper; later in the tournament, the survivors were joined by third-place finishers from the (first) group stage of the Champions League.

From the 2004–05 season, the competition started with two knockout qualifying rounds held in July and August. Participants from associations ranked 18 and lower entered the first qualifying round with those from associations ranked 9–18 joining them in the second qualifying round. In addition, three places in the first qualifying round were reserved for the UEFA Fair Play ranking winners (until 2015–16), and eleven places in the second qualifying round for the UEFA Intertoto Cup winners.

Winners of the qualifying rounds then joined teams from the associations ranked 1–13 in the first round proper. In addition, non-qualifiers in the third qualifying round of the Champions League also joined the competition at this point along with the current title-holders (unless they had qualified for the Champions League via their national league), for a total of 80 teams in the first round.

After the first knockout round, the 40 survivors entered a group stage, with the clubs being drawn into eight groups of five each. Unlike the Champions League group stage, the UEFA Cup group stage was played in a single round-robin format, with each club playing two home and two away games. The top three teams in each of the eight groups qualified for the main knockout round along with the eight third-placed teams in the Champions League group stage. From then on a series of two-legged knockout ties were played before a single-legged final, traditionally held on a Wednesday in May, exactly one week before the Champions League final.

Map of UEFA associations whose teams reached the group stage/league phase of the UEFA Europa League UEFA member association that has been represented in the group stage/league phase UEFA member country that has been represented only in the group stage of the UEFA Cup before the Europa League rebranding UEFA member association that has not been represented in the group stage/league phase Not a UEFA member

In the 2009–10 season, the competition was rebranded as the UEFA Europa League to raise its profile. Eight more teams qualified for the group stage, which consisted of 12 groups with four teams each (in a double round-robin); the top two teams in each group advanced. The competition was then similar to the previous format, with four rounds of two-legged knockout rounds and a one-off final held at a neutral ground which met UEFA's Category Four stadium criteria. Matches are generally played on Thursdays. The final was played in May, on the Wednesday ten days before the Champions League final.

Qualification changed significantly. Associations ranked 7–9 in the UEFA coefficients sent the cup winners and three (two since the 2015–16 season) other teams to the UEFA Europa League qualification; all other nations sent a cup winner and two other teams, except for Andorra and San Marino (who sent a cup winner and a runner-up) and Liechtenstein (who sent only a cup winner). Since Gibraltar was accepted as a full UEFA member at the 24 May 2013 UEFA Congress in London, their cup winner also qualified for the Europa League.

Although the other teams were the next-highest-ranked in each domestic league (after those qualifying for the UEFA Champions League), France and England continued to use one spot for their league-cup winners. With the abolition of the Intertoto Cup, all participants in the Europa League are qualified through domestic routes. The higher an association is ranked in the UEFA coefficients, the later its members begin the qualification. However, every team except for the title-holder (until the 2014–15 season) and the highest-ranked (the cup winner or the best Europa League-qualified) from the top (six from 2012 to 2015, 12 since the 2015–16 season) associations had to play at least one qualification round.

Except for the teams mentioned, all teams eliminated in the Champions League preliminary round, qualifying rounds and play-off round were transferred to the Europa League. The 12 winners and runners-up in the group stage advanced to the knockout round, with eight third-placed teams from the Champions League group stage.

The distribution was changed in 2014 to broaden the competition's appeal, giving the Europa League champions a Champions League qualification berth, more teams automatically qualified for the group stage. If cup winners had already qualified for European competition through league performance, their place in the league is vacated and goes to the best-ranked teams not qualified for European competition; the cup runner-up is no longer qualified through the cup berth. These rules became effective for the 2015–16 season.

=== Distribution (from 2018–19 to 2020–21) ===
Beginning with the 2018–19 tournament, all domestic champions eliminated in the qualifying rounds of the UEFA Champions League will transfer to the Europa League, rather than just teams that are eliminated in the third-qualifying and play-off rounds. Europa League qualifying will also provide a separate champions route for these teams, allowing more opportunities for domestic league champions to compete against each other.

		Teams entering in this round	Teams advancing from previous round	Teams transferred from Champions League
Preliminary round (16 teams)		6 domestic cup winners from associations 50–55; 7 domestic league runners-up from associations 49–55; 3 domestic league third-placed teams from associations 48–50		
First qualifying round (94 teams)		25 domestic cup winners from associations 25–49; 30 domestic league runners-up from associations 18–48 (except Liechtenstein); 31 domestic league third-placed teams from associations 16–47 (except Liechtenstein)	8 winners from preliminary round	
Second qualifying round	Champions (20 teams)			17 losers from Champions League first qualifying round; 3 losers from Champions League preliminary round
Second qualifying round	Non-champions (74 teams)	7 domestic cup winners from associations 18–24; 2 domestic league runners-up from associations 16–17; 3 domestic league third-placed teams from associations 13–15; 9 domestic league fourth-placed teams from associations 7–15; 2 domestic league fifth-placed teams from associations 5–6 (League Cup winners for France); 4 domestic league sixth-placed teams from associations 1–4 (League Cup winners for England)	47 winners from first qualifying round	
Third qualifying round	Champions (20 teams)		10 winners from second qualifying round for champions	10 losers from Champions League second qualifying round for champions
Third qualifying round	Non-champions (52 teams)	5 domestic cup winners from associations 13–17; 6 domestic league third-placed teams from associations 7–12; 1 domestic league fourth-placed team from association 6	37 winners from second qualifying round for non-champions	3 losers from Champions League second qualifying round for non-champions
Play-off round	Champions (16 teams)		10 winners from third qualifying round for champions	6 losers from Champions League third qualifying round for champions
Play-off round	Non-champions (26 teams)		26 winners from third qualifying round for non-champions	
Group stage (48 teams)		12 domestic cup winners from associations 1–12; 1 domestic league fourth-placed team from association 5; 4 domestic league fifth-placed teams from associations 1–4	21 winners from play-off round	6 losers from Champions League play-off round; 4 losers from Champions League third qualifying round for non-champions
Knockout phase (32 teams)			12 group winners from group stage; 12 group runners-up from group stage	8 third-placed teams from Champions League group stage

If the Europa League title holders already qualified for the Champions League group stage via their domestic league, the following changes to the access list would be made:

- The cup winners of association 18 entered the third qualifying round instead of the second qualifying round.
- The cup winners of association 25 entered the second qualifying round instead of the first qualifying round.
- The cup winners of associations 50 and 51 entered the first qualifying round instead of the preliminary round.

=== Distribution (from 2021–22 to 2023–24) ===
The announcement of the UEFA Europa Conference League, a tertiary competition which would serve to split off the lower-ranked teams in the Europa League to give them a greater chance to compete, included a document from UEFA listing their intentions for qualification to the Europa League from 2021 onwards. With a majority of the former entrants into the Europa League now participating solely in the UECL, the Europa League itself would have a greatly reduced format which will focus primarily around its group stage. There would also be an additional knockout round before the knockout phase proper, allowing for third-placed teams in the Champions League group stage to fall into the Europa League while still keeping the knockout stage itself at only 16 teams total.

		Teams entering in this round	Teams advancing from previous round	Teams transferred from Champions League
Third qualifying round	Champions (10 teams)			10 losers from Champions League second qualifying round for champions
Third qualifying round	Non-champions (6 teams)	3 domestic cup winners from associations 13–15		3 losers from Champions League second qualifying round for non-champions
Play-off round (20 teams)		6 domestic cup winners from associations 7–12	5 winners from qualifying round for champions; 3 winners from qualifying round for non-champions	6 losers from Champions League third qualifying round for champions
Group stage (32 teams)		UEFA Europa Conference League title holders (beginning with the 2022–23 season); 6 domestic cup winners from associations 1–6; 1 domestic league fourth-placed team from association 5; 4 domestic league fifth-placed teams from associations 1–4	10 winners from play-off round	4 losers from Champions League play-off round for champions; 6 losers from Champions League third qualifying round and play-off round for non-champions
Preliminary knockout round (16 teams)			8 group runners-up from group stage	8 third-placed teams from Champions League group stage
Knockout stage (16 teams)			8 group winners from group stage; 8 winners from preliminary knockout round	

Changes would be made if the Europa Conference League title holders qualified through their league position:

- The cup winners of association 7 enter the group stage instead of the play-off round.
- The cup winners of association 13 enter the play-off round instead of the third qualifying round.
- The cup winners of association 16 enter the third qualifying round instead of the Europa Conference League second qualifying round.

=== Distribution (from 2024–25) ===
		Teams entering in this round	Teams advancing from the previous round	Teams transferred from Champions League
First qualifying round (18 teams)		18 domestic cup winners from associations 16–33		
Second qualifying round (16 teams)		6 domestic league third-placed teams from associations 7–12; 1 domestic league fourth-placed team from association 6	9 winners from the first qualifying round	
Third qualifying round	Champions (12 teams)			12 losers from Champions League second qualifying round for champions
Third qualifying round	Non-champions (14 teams)	3 domestic cup winners from associations 13–15	8 winners from second qualifying round	3 losers from Champions League second qualifying round for non-champions
Play-off round (24 teams)		5 domestic cup winners from associations 8–12	6 winners from third qualifying round for champions; 7 winners from third qualifying round for non-champions	6 losers from Champions League third qualifying round for champions
League phase (36 teams)		UEFA Conference League title holders; 7 domestic cup winners from associations 1–7; 5 domestic league fifth-placed teams from associations 1–5	12 winners from play-off round	5 losers from Champions League play-off round for champions; 6 losers from Champions League third qualifying round and play-off round for non-champions

Changes will be made to the access list above if the Europa League or Conference League title holder qualifies for the tournament via their domestic leagues.

- If the Europa League title holders qualify for the league phase via their domestic league's standard berth allocation, the best-ranked club in qualifying rounds (both champions path and league path) enters the league phase without leapfrogging, then associations in the UEFA coefficient ranking are promoted to later qualifying rounds, and teams of the highest-ranked associations in earlier rounds are also promoted accordingly.
- If the Conference League title holders qualify for the league phase via their domestic league's standard berth allocation, the best-ranked club in qualifying rounds (both champions path and league path) enters the league phase without leapfrogging, then associations in the UEFA coefficient ranking are promoted to later qualifying rounds, and teams of the highest-ranked associations in earlier rounds are also promoted accordingly.
- If the Europa League or Conference League title holders qualify for the qualifying rounds via their domestic league, their spot in the qualifying rounds is vacated, and teams of the highest-ranked associations in earlier rounds are promoted accordingly.

== Prize money ==
Similar to the UEFA Champions League, the prize money received by the clubs is divided into fixed payments based on participation and results, and variable amounts that depend on the value of their TV market.

For the 2021–22 season, group stage participation in the Europa League awarded a base fee of €3,630,000. A victory in the group pays €630,000 and a draw €210,000. Each group winner earns €1,100,000 and each runner-up €550,000. Reaching the knock-out stage triggered additional bonuses: €500,000 for the round of 32, €1,200,000 for the round of 16, €1,800,000 for the quarter-finals and €2,800,000 for the semi-finals. The losing finalists received €4,600,000 and the champions received €8,600,000.

- Qualified to group stage: €3,630,000
- Match won in group stage: €630,000
- Match drawn in group stage: €210,000
- 1st in group stage: €1,100,000
- 2nd in group stage: €550,000
- Knockout round play-offs: €500,000
- Round of 16: €1,200,000
- Quarter-finals: €1,800,000
- Semi-finals: €2,800,000
- Runners-up: €4,600,000
- Winners: €8,600,000

== Sponsorship ==
The UEFA Europa League is sponsored by seven multinational corporations, which share the same partners as the UEFA Conference League. The tournament's main sponsors for the 2024–27 cycle are:

- Just Eat Takeaway
- Hankook
- Engelbert Strauss
- Swissquote
- Betano
- Lidl
- FlixBus

Decathlon's Kipsta sub-brand is the official match ball supplier from the 2024–25 season onwards for a three-year period.

Since the inception of the Europa League brand, the tournament has used its own advertising hoardings (in that year they debuted in the round of 32) like the UEFA Champions League. LED hoardings made their debut in the 2012–13 final and appeared in the 2015–16 season from the round of 16. Since the same season, from the group stage onwards, teams are not allowed to show their own sponsors. They appeared in the 2018–19 season for selected matches in the group stages and the round of 32.

Individual clubs may wear jerseys with advertising, even if such sponsors conflict with those of the Europa League. Two sponsorships are permitted per jersey (plus that of the manufacturer), at the chest and the left sleeve. Exceptions are made for non-profit organisations, which can feature on the front of the shirt, incorporated with the main sponsor, or on the back, either below the squad number or between the player name and the collar.

== Records and statistics ==
The UEFA Cup finals were played over two legs until 1997. The first final, between Wolverhampton Wanderers and Tottenham Hotspur, was played on 3 May 1972 in Wolverhampton and 17 May 1972 in London. The first leg was won 2–1 by Tottenham Hotspur. The second leg ended in a 1–1 draw, meaning that Tottenham Hotspur became the first UEFA Cup winners.

The one-match finals in pre-selected venues were introduced in 1998. A venue must meet or exceed UEFA Category three standards to host UEFA Cup finals. On two occasions, the final was played at a finalist's home ground: Feyenoord defeated Borussia Dortmund at De Kuip, Rotterdam, in 2002, and Sporting CP lost to CSKA Moscow at their own Estádio José Alvalade, Lisbon, in 2005.

The last UEFA Cup final before it was rebranded as the UEFA Europa League was held at the Şükrü Saracoğlu Stadium in Istanbul on 20 May 2009, when Shakhtar Donetsk of Ukraine beat Werder Bremen of Germany 2–1 after extra time.

The first final of the rebranded Europa League was played in 2010, when Atlético Madrid of Spain beat Fulham of England 2–1 after extra time.

=== Performances by club ===
Performance in the UEFA Cup and UEFA Europa League by club
Club	Winners	Runners-up	Years won	Years runner-up
(Spain) Sevilla	7	0	2006, 2007, 2014, 2015, 2016, 2020, 2023	—
(Italy) Inter Milan	3	2	1991, 1994, 1998	1997, 2020
(England) Tottenham Hotspur	3	1	1972, 1984, 2025	1974
(England) Liverpool	3	1	1973, 1976, 2001	2016
(Italy) Juventus	3	1	1977, 1990, 1993	1995
(Spain) Atlético Madrid	3	0	2010, 2012, 2018	—
(Germany) Borussia Mönchengladbach	2	2	1975, 1979	1973, 1980
(Netherlands) Feyenoord	2	0	1974, 2002	—
(Germany) Eintracht Frankfurt	2	0	1980, 2022	—
(Sweden) IFK Göteborg	2	0	1982, 1987	—
(Spain) Real Madrid	2	0	1985, 1986	—
(Italy) Parma	2	0	1995, 1999	—
(Portugal) Porto	2	0	2003, 2011	—
(England) Chelsea	2	0	2013, 2019	—
(England) Manchester United	1	2	2017	2021, 2025
(Belgium) Anderlecht	1	1	1983	1984
(Germany) Bayer Leverkusen	1	1	1988	2024
(Netherlands) Ajax	1	1	1992	2017
(Netherlands) PSV Eindhoven	1	0	1978	—
(England) Ipswich Town	1	0	1981	—
(Italy) Napoli	1	0	1989	—
(Germany) Bayern Munich	1	0	1996	—
(Germany) Schalke 04	1	0	1997	—
(Turkey) Galatasaray	1	0	2000	—
(Spain) Valencia	1	0	2004	—
(Russia) CSKA Moscow	1	0	2005	—
(Russia) Zenit Saint Petersburg	1	0	2008	—
(Ukraine) Shakhtar Donetsk	1	0	2009	—
(Spain) Villarreal	1	0	2021	—
(Italy) Atalanta	1	0	2024	—
(England) Aston Villa	1	0	2026	—
(Portugal) Benfica	0	3	—	1983, 2013, 2014
(France) Marseille	0	3	—	1999, 2004, 2018
(Spain) Athletic Bilbao	0	2	—	1977, 2012
(Spain) Espanyol	0	2	—	1988, 2007
(Italy) Roma	0	2	—	1991, 2023
(Germany) Borussia Dortmund	0	2	—	1993, 2002
(England) Arsenal	0	2	—	2000, 2019
(Scotland) Rangers	0	2	—	2008, 2022
(England) Wolverhampton Wanderers	0	1	—	1972
(Netherlands) Twente	0	1	—	1975
(Belgium) Club Brugge	0	1	—	1976
(France) Bastia	0	1	—	1978
(Socialist Federal Republic of Yugoslavia) Red Star Belgrade	0	1	—	1979
(Netherlands) AZ	0	1	—	1981
(Germany) Hamburger SV	0	1	—	1982
(Hungary) Videoton	0	1	—	1985
(Germany) 1. FC Köln	0	1	—	1986
(Scotland) Dundee United	0	1	—	1987
(Germany) VfB Stuttgart	0	1	—	1989
(Italy) Fiorentina	0	1	—	1990
(Italy) Torino	0	1	—	1992
Austria Salzburg	0	1	—	1994
(France) Bordeaux	0	1	—	1996
(Italy) Lazio	0	1	—	1998
(Spain) Alavés	0	1	—	2001
(Scotland) Celtic	0	1	—	2003
(Portugal) Sporting CP	0	1	—	2005
(England) Middlesbrough	0	1	—	2006
(Germany) Werder Bremen	0	1	—	2009
(England) Fulham	0	1	—	2010
(Portugal) Braga	0	1	—	2011
(Ukraine) Dnipro Dnipropetrovsk	0	1	—	2015
(Germany) SC Freiburg	0	1	—	2026

=== Performances by nation ===
Performance in finals by nation
Nation	Winners	Runners-up	Total
Spain	14	5	19
England	11	9	20
Italy	10	8	18
Germany (Note: Includes clubs representing West Germany. No clubs representing East Germany appeared in a final.)	7	10	17
Netherlands	4	3	7
Portugal	2	5	7
Russia	2	0	2
Sweden	2	0	2
Belgium	1	2	3
Ukraine	1	1	2
Turkey	1	0	1
France	0	5	5
Scotland	0	4	4
Austria	0	1	1
Hungary	0	1	1
Yugoslavia (Note: The Yugoslav final appearance was by a club from SR Serbia.)	0	1	1

== Awards ==
=== Player of the Season ===
Starting from the 2016–17 edition of the competition, UEFA introduced the UEFA Europa League Player of the Season award.

The jury is composed of the coaches of the clubs which participate in the group stage of the competition, together with 55 journalists selected by the European Sports Media (ESM) group, one from each UEFA member association.

Season	Player	Club
UEFA Europa League Player of the Season
2016–17	(France) Paul Pogba	(England) Manchester United
2017–18	(France) Antoine Griezmann	(Spain) Atlético Madrid
2018–19	(Belgium) Eden Hazard	(England) Chelsea
2019–20	(Belgium) Romelu Lukaku	(Italy) Inter Milan
2020–21	(Spain) Gerard Moreno	(Spain) Villarreal
2021–22	(Serbia) Filip Kostić	(Germany) Eintracht Frankfurt
2022–23	(Spain) Jesús Navas	(Spain) Sevilla
2023–24	(Gabon) Pierre-Emerick Aubameyang	(France) Marseille
2024–25	(Argentina) Cristian Romero	(England) Tottenham Hotspur
2025–26	(England) Morgan Rogers	(England) Aston Villa

=== Young Player of the Season ===
Starting from the 2021–22 edition of the competition, UEFA introduced the UEFA Europa League Young Player of the Season award, chosen by UEFA's Technical Observer Panel.

Season	Player	Club
UEFA Europa League Young Player of the Season
2021–22	(Germany) Ansgar Knauff	(Germany) Eintracht Frankfurt
2022–23	(Germany) Florian Wirtz	(Germany) Bayer Leverkusen
2023–24	(Germany) Florian Wirtz	(Germany) Bayer Leverkusen
2024–25	(France) Rayan Cherki	(France) Lyon
2025–26	(Switzerland) Johan Manzambi	(Germany) SC Freiburg

== See also ==
- Copa Sudamericana – South American equivalent
- AFC Champions League Two – Asian equivalent
- CAF Confederation Cup – African equivalent
- UEFA Cup Winners' Cup – merged into
- Inter-Cities Fairs Cup – predecessor
