= GDE Bertoni =

Italian trophy and medal manufacturer

- Industry: Manufacturing
- Founder: Emilio Bertoni
- Headquarters: Milan, Italy
- Key people: Valentina Losa (CEO)
- Website: Official website

GDE Bertoni, also known as Stabilimento Artistico Bertoni, is a trophy and medal manufacturing company based in Milan, Italy. The company's most famous production is the FIFA World Cup Trophy, which it has produced ever since winning a design competition in 1970. A brass replica of the FIFA World Cup Trophy is hand-crafted every four years by the company, to be awarded to the winners of the FIFA World Cup.

GDE Bertoni started as a small artisanal workshop founded in the early 1900s by Emilio Bertoni before becoming a large production company in the 1960s after creating the Olympic medals for the 1960 Summer Olympics in Rome. When FIFA held a competition for a new trophy design in 1970, Losa presented concept sketches and a physical prototype of a design by Silvio Gazzaniga, winning the competition. Every award produced by GDE Bertoni is created with traditional artisan techniques and built by hand. The trophies awarded to winners of the FIFA World Cup are not the original, but rather bronze replicas plated in gold created by GDE Bertoni.

GDE Bertoni has a contract with the royal court of Bahrain to produce the country's military medals and produces several trophies for UEFA, including the European Champion Clubs' Cup, the UEFA Europa League trophy, and the UEFA Super Cup trophy. The company also produced the medals for the 1980 Summer Olympics in Moscow.

== Notable productions ==
Notable awards produced by GDE Bertoni include:

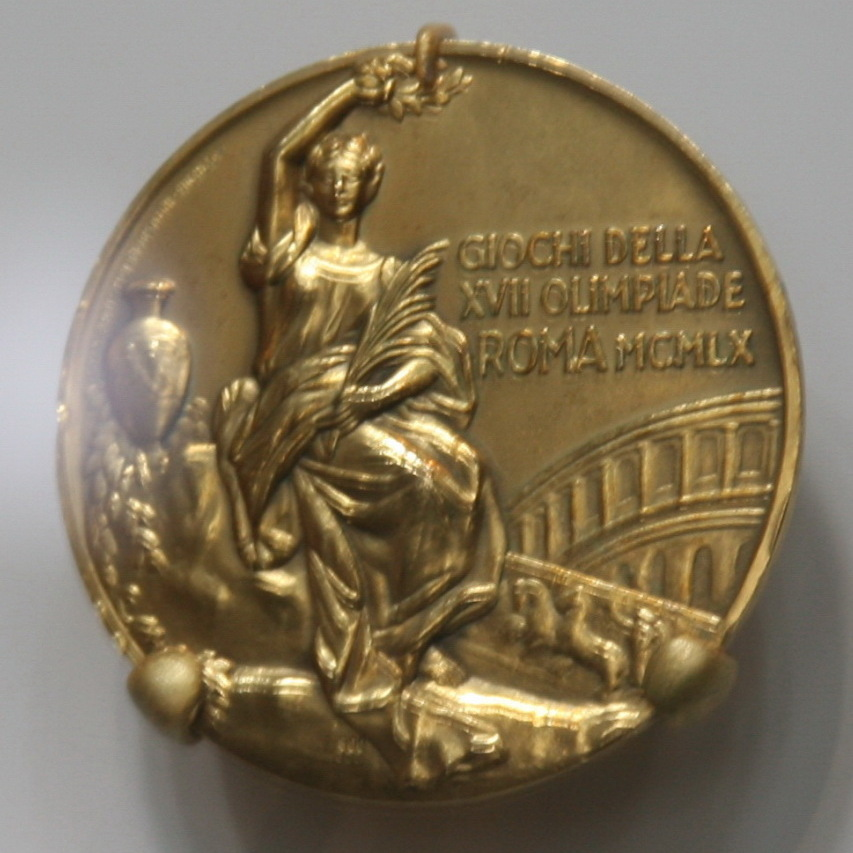
1960 Summer Olympics medals

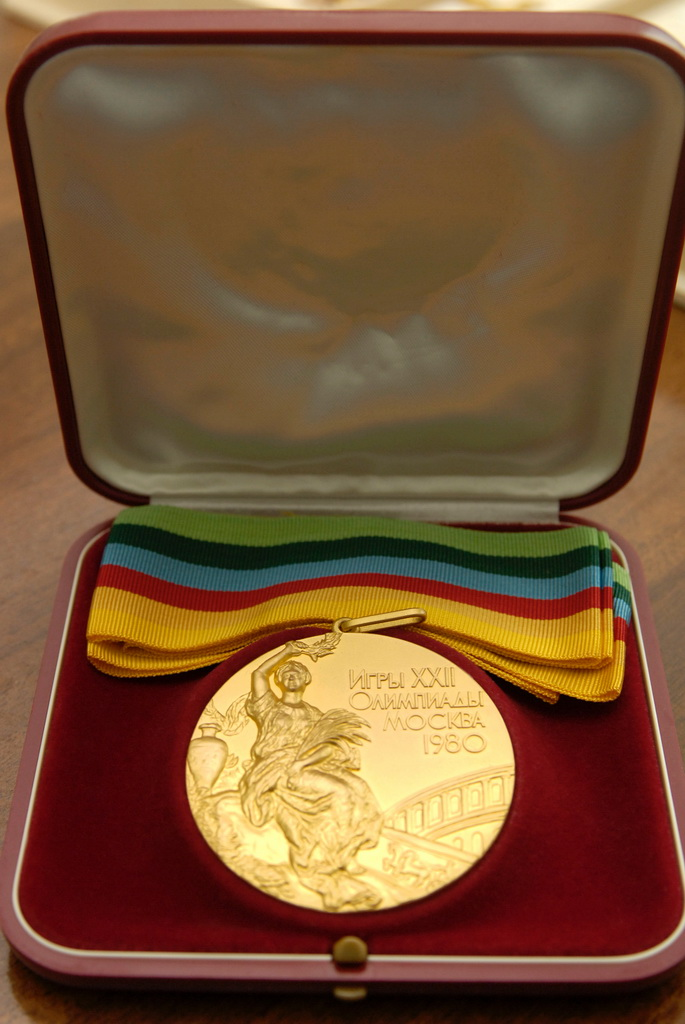
1980 Summer Olympics medals

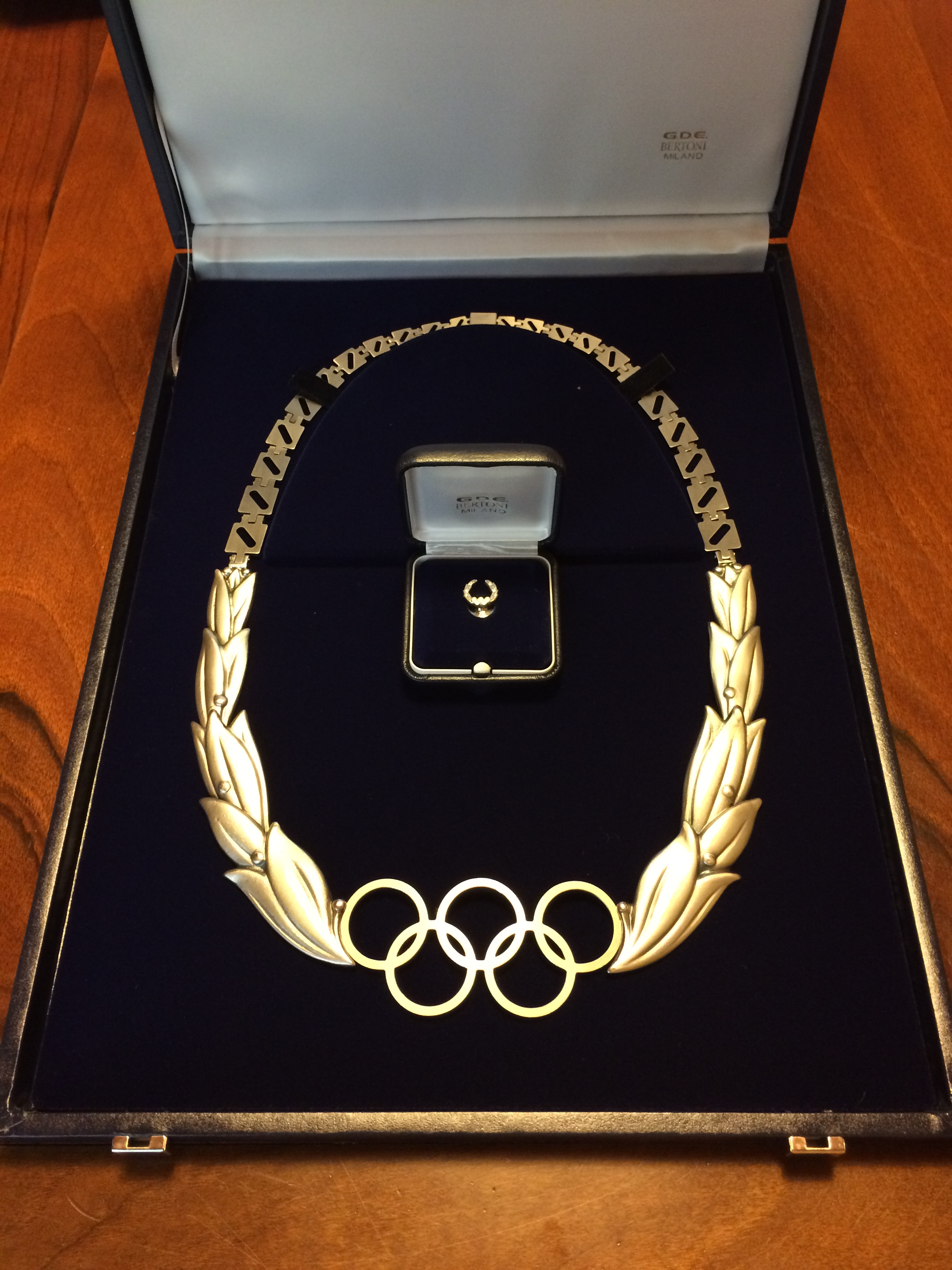
Olympic Order

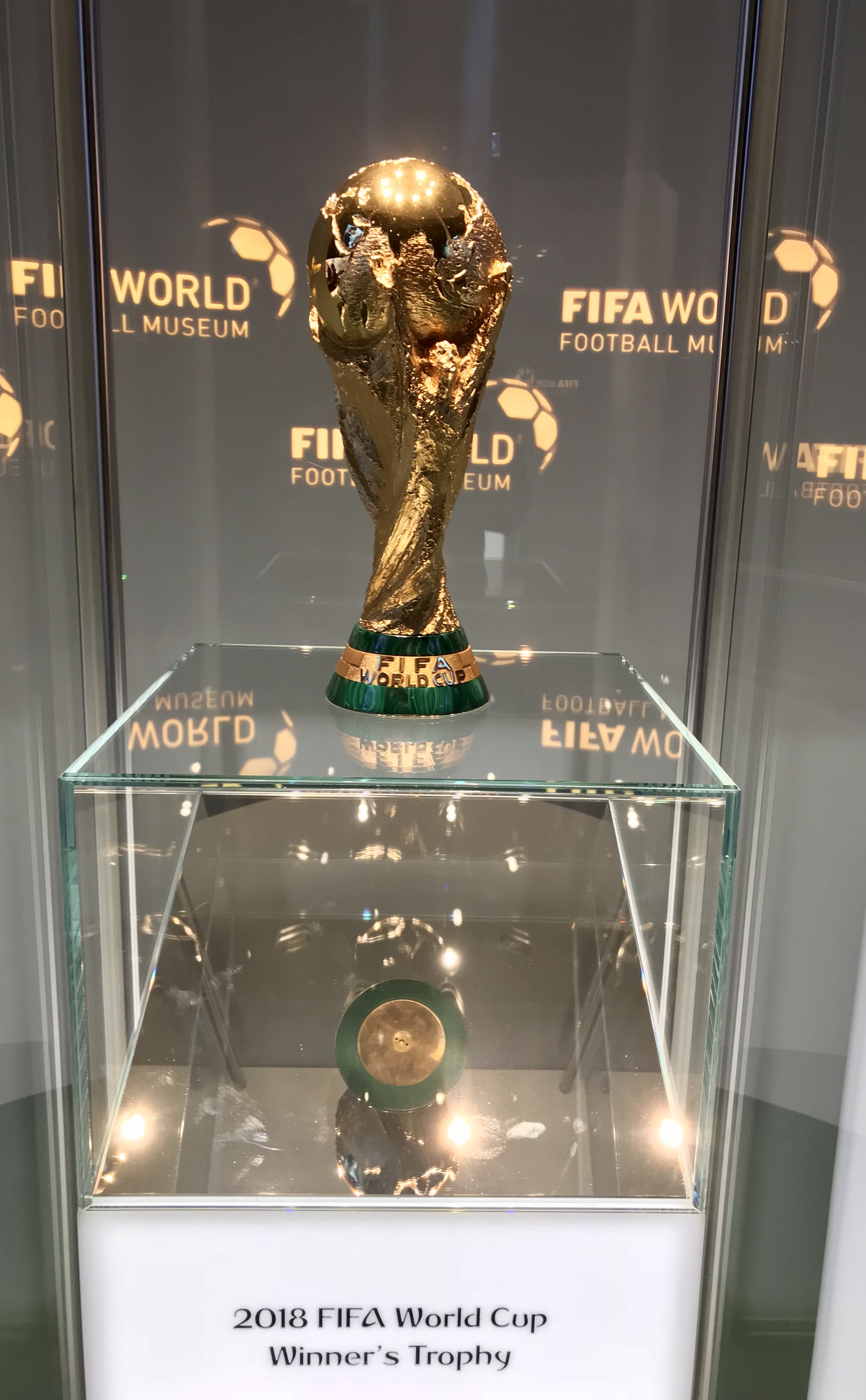
FIFA World Cup Trophy

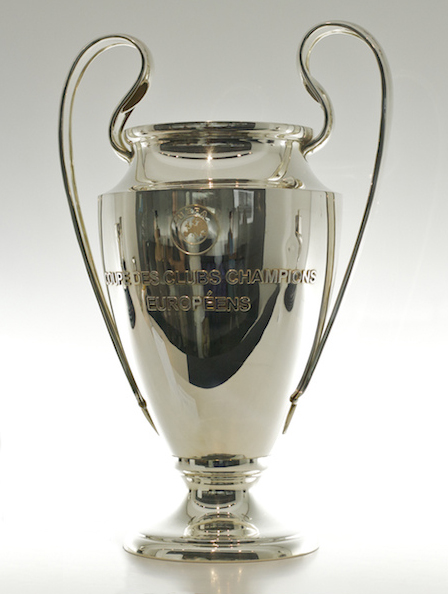
European Champion Clubs' Cup

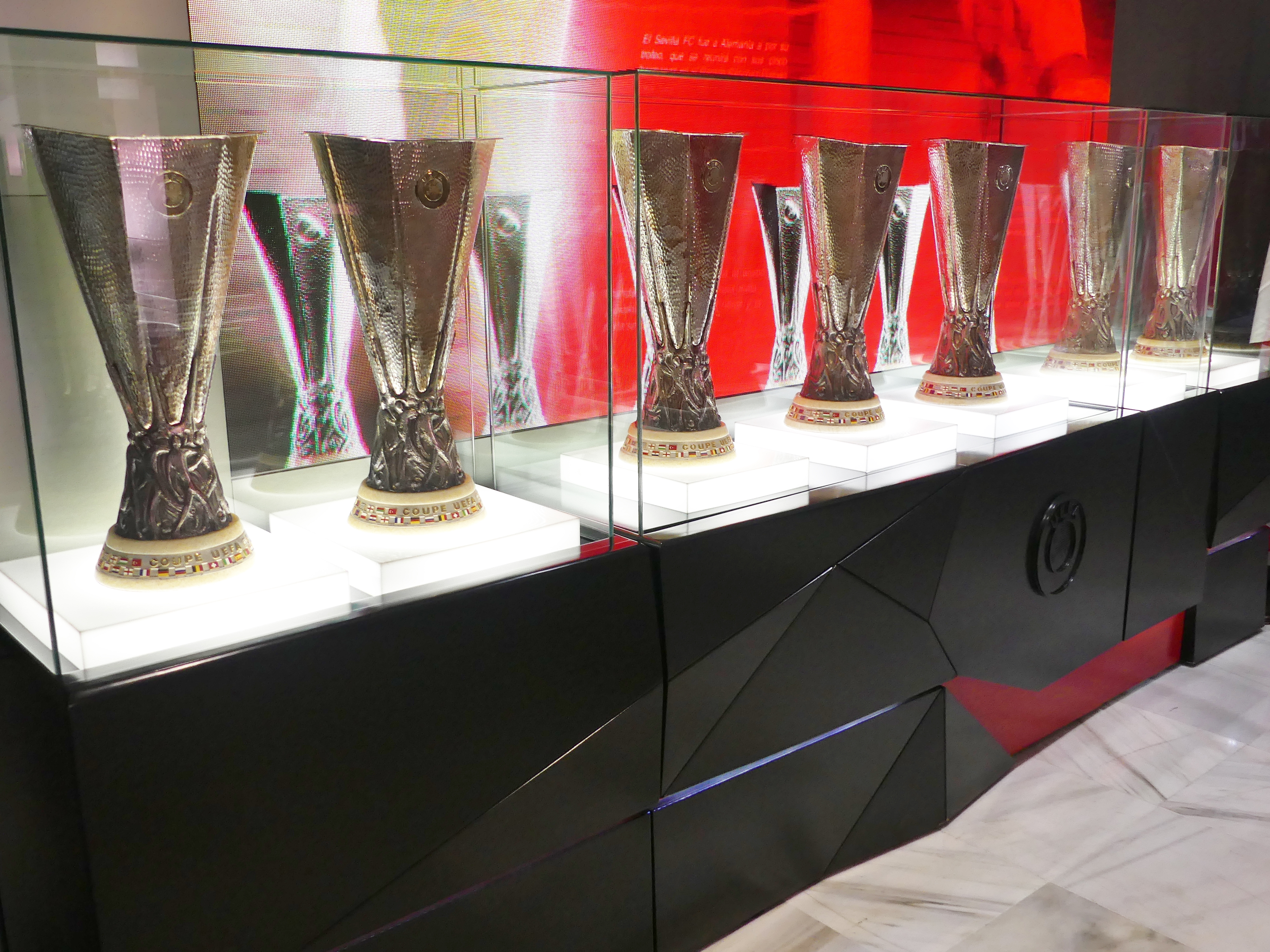
UEFA Europa League trophy

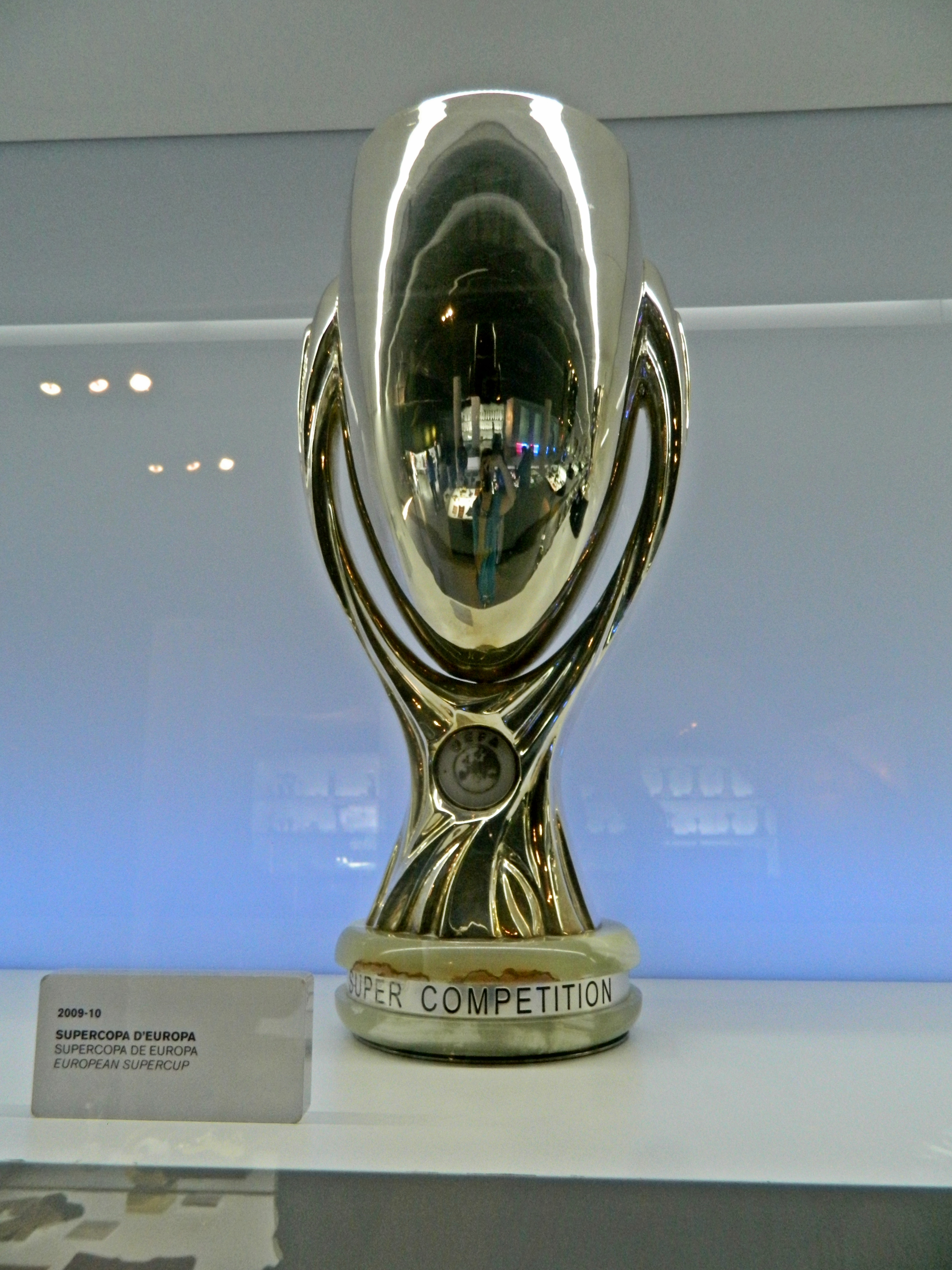
UEFA Super Cup trophy

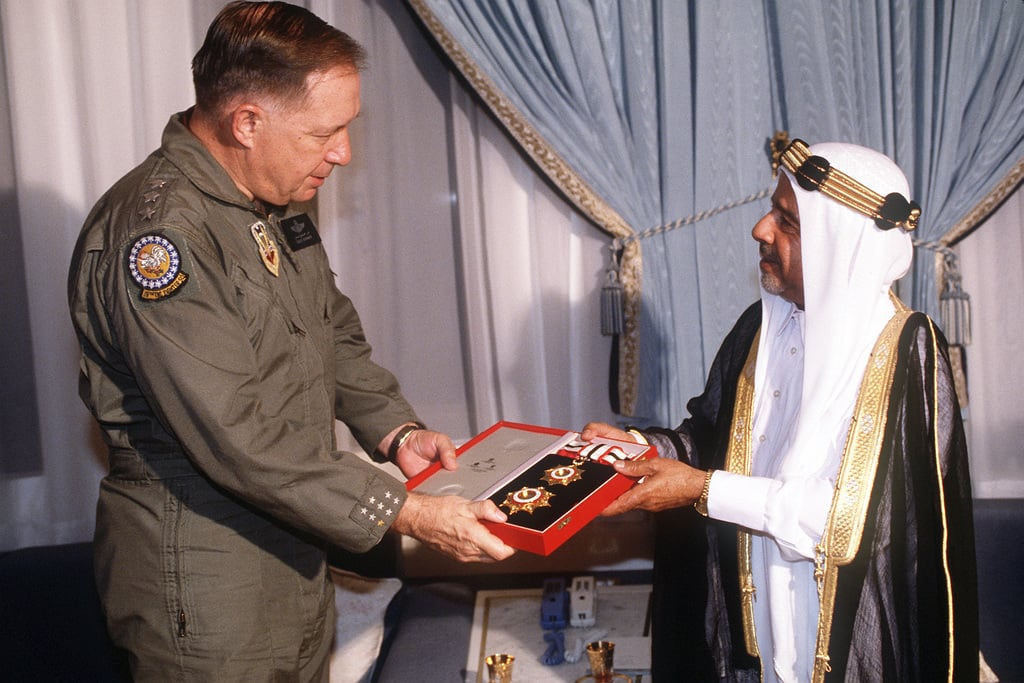
Military medals of Bahrain

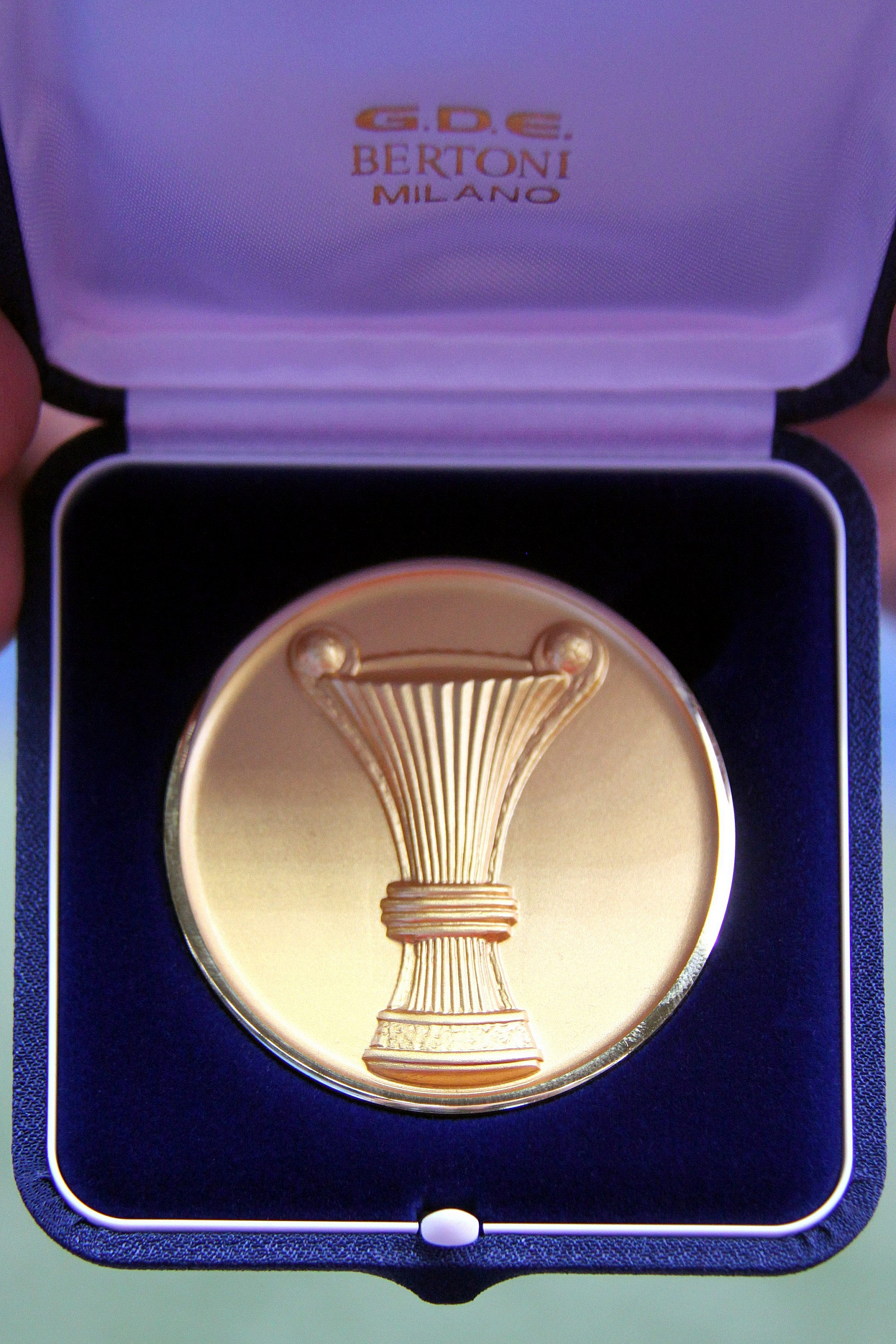
Austrian Cup medal
