= FIFA Museum =

Sports museum in Zurich, Switzerland

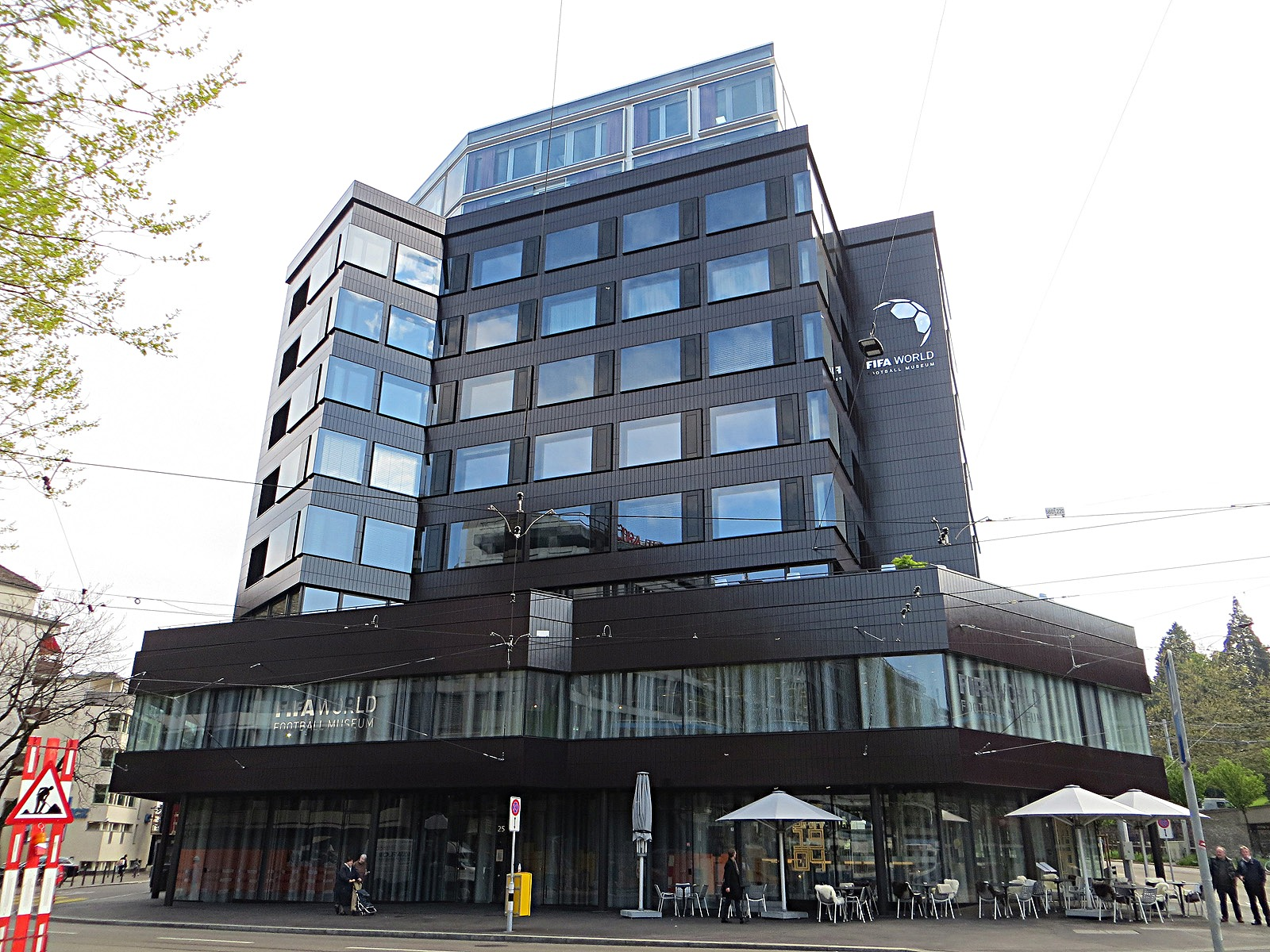
- Museum exterior
- Established: 28 February 2016
- Location: Zurich, Switzerland
- Coordinates: 47.363509°N 8.531749°E
- Type: Sports museum
- Director: Marco Fazzone
- Owner: FIFA
- Public transit access: Zürich Enge railway station
- Website: fifamuseum.com

The FIFA Museum is an association football museum operated by FIFA. The museum is located in Zurich, Switzerland, across town from the FIFA headquarters. It opened on 28 February 2016. The project, costing over SFr500 million ($563m), is currently under investigation for "suspected criminal mismanagement".

== Exhibits and amenities ==
The 3,500 m^{2} (38,000 sq ft) museum occupies the lower three floors of the renovated Haus zur Enge, a ten-story mixed-use building located in the Enge quarter, across from the Zurich Enge railway station and the FIFA-owned Hotel Ascot. The building also contains a sports bar, a bistro, a café, a library, a museum shop and conference rooms; the upper floors have office spaces and 34 luxury apartments.

The museum exhibits over one thousand objects. These include memorabilia from every FIFA World Cup and FIFA Women's World Cup, the most famous one being the original FIFA World Cup Trophy. The exhibition features various interactive and multimedia installations such as the biggest pinball machine ever made and an audiovisual media installation called Visions of Football using 8 metres (26 ft) LED screens. In 2017, the museum was nominated for the German Design Award.

Every year, the museum participates in Zurich's Long Night of Museums.

== History ==
Plans for a museum dedicated to the 'history of world football' to be located in Zurich were proposed by then-FIFA president Sepp Blatter and the FIFA Executive Committee in 2012. In April 2013, FIFA signed a 40-year lease with Swiss Life for the Haus zur Enge, which would be dismantled and rebuilt to house the museum; an earlier proposal would have had a museum on the grounds of the FIFA headquarters. The City of Zurich Building Authority approved planning permission for the museum in November 2013.

Construction on the renovated Haus zur Enge began in 2014 and was completed in December 2015.

The museum opened on 28 February 2016, during a ceremony presided by the newly elected president of FIFA, Gianni Infantino.

On 22 December 2020, FIFA launched legal action against its former president Sepp Blatter for "suspected criminal mismanagement". Despite costing over SFr500 million ($563m), the museum made only $3m of Fifa's $766m 2019 overall revenues.

== Reception ==
The FIFA World Football Museum in Zurich, which opened in February 2016, polarized opinion. Its building cost 30 million Swiss francs, but the exhibition was criticized for failing to examine FIFA's history without embellishment. Although senior FIFA officials had been arrested at the nearby Hotel Baur au Lac, the museum contained no reference to the event.

== See also ==
- List of museums in Switzerland
