= The Spy with a Cold Nose =

1966 British film by Daniel Petrie

- Directed by: Daniel Petrie
- Written by: Ray Galton; Alan Simpson
- Produced by: Joseph E. Levine; Leonard Lightstone
- Starring: Laurence Harvey; Daliah Lavi; Lionel Jeffries; Pickles (dog)
- Cinematography: Kenneth Higgins
- Edited by: Jack Slade
- Music by: Riz Ortolani
- Production company: Associated London Films
- Distributed by: Paramount British Pictures (UK); AVCO Embassy Pictures (US)
- Release date: 19 December 1966
- Running time: 93 minutes
- Country: United Kingdom
- Language: English

The Spy with a Cold Nose is a 1966 British comedy film directed by Daniel Petrie and starring Laurence Harvey, Daliah Lavi, Lionel Jeffries, Denholm Elliott, and Colin Blakely. It was written by Ray Galton and Alan Simpson.

== Premise ==
A dog has a covert listening device implanted before being presented as a gift to the Russian leader. Spies recruit a veterinarian to retrieve the transmitter before the Russians find it.

== Cast ==
- Laurence Harvey as Dr. Francis Trevelyan
- Daliah Lavi as Princess Natasha Romanova
- Lionel Jeffries as Stanley Farquhar
- Eric Sykes as Wrigley
- Eric Portman as British Ambassador
- Denholm Elliott as Pond-Jones
- Colin Blakely as Russian Premier
- June Whitfield as Elsie Farquhar
- Robert Flemyng as Chief M.I.5
- Bernard Archard as Russian Intelligence Officer
- Robin Bailey as man with Aston Martin
- Genevieve as nightclub hostess
- Nai Bonet as belly Dancer
- Paul Ford as American General
- Michael Trubshawe as Braithwaite
- Bruce Carstairs as Butler
- Glen Mason as 'Ark' assistant
- Norma Foster as 'Ark' nurse
- Gillian Lewis as Lady Warburton
- Wanda Ventham as Mrs. Winters
- Amy Dalby as Miss Marchbanks
- Tricia De Dulin as air hostess
- Virginia Lyon as lift attendant
- Julian Orchard as policeman
- Jack Woolgar as zoo keeper (uncredited)
- John Forbes-Robertson as M.I.5 Workshop Director
- Arnold Diamond as agent in water wagon
- Pickles the dog as himself

== Production ==
Exterior locations included: Royal Garden Hotel, Moor Park Golf Club, Castle Howard, London Zoo, Richmond, London; Newington Causeway; Elephant and Castle; and 29 Danehurst Gardens. The signs read The Francis Trevellyan [sic] Animal Foundation and The Ark, at Eileen House, since demolished.

== Critical reception ==
The Monthly Film Bulletin wrote: "Broad, thoroughly British farce, developed along totally predictable lines but partly saved by a script which at least has the virtue of keeping things on the move, and by a zany and superbly timed performance from Lionel Jeffries. There is good support from Colin Blakely as the dog-loving Russian Premier and from Eric Portman as the British Ambassador who holds private meetings in a sound-proof glass bowl. The dogs have thankfully little to say for themselves."

The Radio Times Guide to Films gave the film 3/5 stars, writing: "Ace sitcom writers Ray Galton and Alan Simpson here offer their contribution to the spy boom that was dominating popular cinema in the 1960s. Their sub-Bondian farce stars Laurence Harvey and fine comedy actor Lionel Jeffries in a story of Cold War espionage which features a bulldog with a listening bug grafted to its insides for spying on the Russians. The script was held up as a model of its type but the genius of the words lost a little something in translation, but much mirth remains."

Film critic Leslie Halliwell said: "Rather painful, overacted and overwritten farce full of obvious jokes masquarading as satire."

== Accolades ==
The film was nominated for the 1967 Golden Globe Awards in the Best English-Language Foreign Film category, and Lionel Jeffries in the Best Performance in a Comedy or Musical category.
