= Abel Lafleur =

French sculptor (1875–1953)

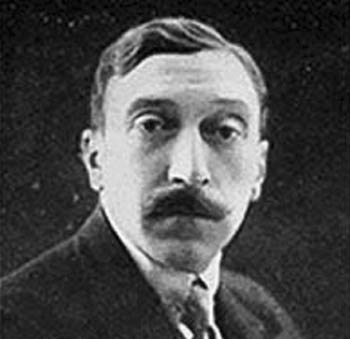
- Lafleur, c. 1920s
- Born: 4 November 1875; Rodez, Midi-Pyrénées, France
- Died: 27 January 1953 (aged 77)
- Occupations: Sculptor; medalist
- Known for: Designer of the Jules Rimet Trophy

Abel Lafleur (4 November 1875 – 27 January 1953) was a French sculptor who designed and made the FIFA World Cup trophy, first simply called 'Coupe du Monde', later renamed the Jules Rimet Trophy.

== Early life and education ==
Lafleur was born in Rodez, in South-West France in the Midi-Pyrénées region.

He attended the École des Arts Décoratifs and the École des Beaux-Arts in Paris and was heavily influenced as a pupil by the French medallists Jules-Clément Chaplain (1839–1909), and Hubert Ponscarme (1827–1903) and worked alongside Alexandre Charpentier (1856–1909), who had been an assistant to Ponscarme.

Lafleur specialised in the naked female form, as a subject for medallic sculpture.

== Career ==
From 1901, Lafleur exhibited regularly at the Salon des Artistes Français, at the Salon des Indépendants and at the Salon d'Automne. In 1910 he contributed to the New York Medallic Exhibition. Lafleur was awarded a gold medal, and on 8 August 1920 he was nominated to the grade of Chevalier of the Légion d'honneur. Lafleur was a contemporary of René Gregoire (1871–1945) and Pierre Charles Lenoir (1871–1953). He also competed in the art competitions at the 1932 Summer Olympics.

== Jules Rimet Trophy ==
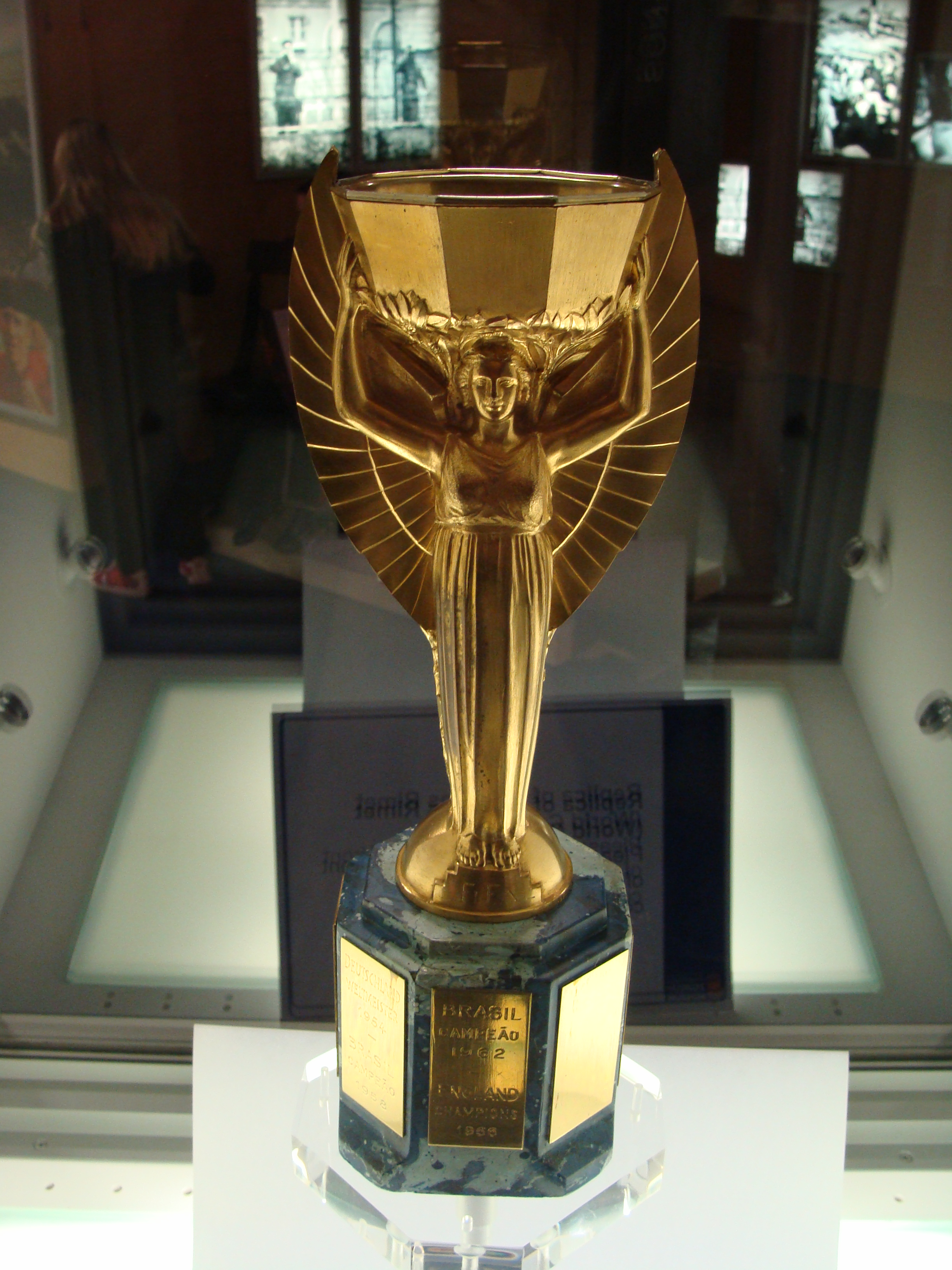
The trophy designed by Lafleur in 1929

The trophy was 35 cm in height, weighed 3.8 kg and was made of gold-plated sterling silver, with a blue base of semi-precious stone (lapis lazuli). On the four sides of the base there were four gold plates, onto which would be written the names of the winners of the trophy. The sculpture, although based on the incomplete Nike of Samothrace ("The Goddess of Victory"), which remains on display at the Louvre, was designed to include the shallow, octagonal cup supported by upraised arms and a garland surrounding the model's head. Lafleur knowingly dispensed with the faithful, dynamic design (as used by Rolls-Royce to adorn their vehicles) but decided on a static representation that would assist in how the trophy was held.

== See also ==
- Silvio Gazzaniga
