= Silvio Gazzaniga =

Italian sculptor (1921–2016)

- Gazzaniga with his FIFA World Cup trophy, c. 1974
- Born: 23 January 1921; Milan, Kingdom of Italy
- Died: 31 October 2016 (aged 95); Milan, Italy
- Known for: Sculpting
- Notable work: FIFA World Cup; UEFA Cup; UEFA Super Cup; International Baseball Federation
- Awards: Ambrogino D'Oro
- Website: http://www.silviogazzaniga.com/

Silvio Gazzaniga (Italian pronunciation: [ˈsilvjo ɡaddzaˈniːɡa]; 23 January 1921 – 31 October 2016) was an Italian sculptor. While working for the Stabilimento Artistico Bertoni company, he created the FIFA World Cup Trophy.

== Early life and education ==
Silvio Gazzaniga was born in Milan on 23 January 1921. He studied to become a sculptor at the art schools in Milan, the capital of Lombardy. During the avant-garde period of the 1940s, he attended the "Humanitarian School of Applied Art" and the "High School of Art" at the Sforzesco Castle, specialising as a goldsmith and jeweller.

== Career ==
After the disruption of World War II, he began his career as a sculptor of medals, cups, and decorations, and at the end of 1953, he began collaborating with Bertoni Milano (known today as GDE Bertoni), the artistic director and master sculptor.

After Brazil won the 1970 World Cup, FIFA rules dictated that Brazil would keep the Rimet Cup in perpetuity. FIFA, therefore, needed another trophy for subsequent World Cups. Of the 53 designs submitted by artists from around the world, Gazzaniga's was the winning design. The new cup represents the joy, exultation, and greatness of the athlete at the moment of victory: two stylised figures that hold the world aloft. Gazzaniga achieved worldwide artistic fame and success with the creation of this trophy.

Riding on the wave of this success, he continued to create other football trophies, such as the UEFA Cup trophy (1972) and the UEFA Super Cup trophy (1973). He also produced the Baseball World Cup trophy (2001), Bobsleigh and Volleyball World Cup trophies, and medals for major sporting events, including basketball, swimming, and skiingThe Presidency of the Council of Ministers, under the patronage of Giorgio Napolitano, President of the Italian Republic, decided to create a trophy to commemorate the 150th anniversary of the unification of Italy. A trophy that would take its place next to the most important Italian trophies of 2011. Gazzaniga was asked to create this trophy, and he enthusiastically rose to the challenge, submitting a design for the Cup to the Italian State.

On 7 December 2003, the then Mayor of Milan, Gabriele Albertini, on behalf of the Milan City Council, bestowed the highest possible honor upon Gazzaniga, the "Certificate of Merit of the Ambrogino d’Oro". This loyal citizen of Milan was given this honour to commemorate "his professional reputation as one of the most prolific contemporary artists of the city".

Honours have also come from the international circle. On 14 October 2011, while attending a meeting for the annual edition of the International Numismatic Fair in Vicenza, the International Association of Numismatists and Medal Designers bestowed upon him the International Award for his contribution to his Profession with the following dedication: "In his long career, this great artist has distinguished himself as the creator of beautifully drawn designs of coins and medals and, in particular, has known how to portray different subjects with courage and consummate skill".

== Personal life and death ==
He was married to his wife, Elsa, for over 60 years; the couple had two children, Gabriella and Giorgio. She was reportedly the love of his life and his partner in art. In addition to sports, he was also passionate about design, sports cars, and aircraft. He used to get inspiration from walking in the mountains and photographing nature.

He died on 31 October 2016 in Milan.

== FIFA World Cup Trophy ==
Gazzaniga created the world's most sought-after football trophy. The FIFA World Cup Trophy was designed and created in 1971 and since that time he has seen it pass through the hands of many famous football personalities and legends. Franz Beckenbauer was the first to proudly present it to the world in 1974; an honour that was followed by Daniel Passarella in 1978, Dino Zoff in 1982, Diego Maradona in 1986, Lothar Matthäus in 1990, Dunga in 1994, Didier Deschamps in 1998, Cafu in 2002, Fabio Cannavaro in 2006, Iker Casillas in 2010, Philipp Lahm in 2014, Hugo Lloris in 2018, Lionel Messi in 2022, and Rodri in 2026.

=== History ===
After Brazil retained the right to keep the Jules Rimet Trophy as a result of winning it for the third time at the World Cup Final in Mexico in 1970, FIFA needed to create another trophy. On 5 April 1971, at the FIFA headquarters in Zurich, a jury of experts led by the former FIFA President, Sir Stanley Rous, convened to form a special committee that received the authorisation to put out to tender the request for a creator of a new Cup.

Closeted away in his studio situated in the artists' quarter of Milan, near the Brera Academy and Sforzesco Castle, Gazzaniga began work immediately. Given the difficulties of preparing simple sketches to convey the design's fluidity, he also created a plasticine model and a plaster cast. The uncertainty involved in creating a design without first having reached a formal agreement also stood him in good stead. 53 designs were submitted from 25 nations worldwide, but after experiencing the sight, feel, symbolic beauty, and photogenic quality of Silvio Gazzaniga's design, FIFA gave their seal of approval. The Cup was immediately cast in gold and officially adopted by FIFA in January 1972.

=== Numbers ===
"Cera Persa" (lost wax) was the technique used to cast the Cup, the very same method used thousands of years ago to create some of the most famous metal statues of antiquity. It is formed of solid 18-carat gold, even though it is hollow inside, it weighs 6,175 grams. It is 36,8 centimetres tall with a base diameter of 13 centimetres. The base is composed of two green malachite bands, while the inner and lower sections are inscribed with the names of the teams that have won the World Cup since 1974. The contrasting panels are each inscribed with the language of their respective nations.

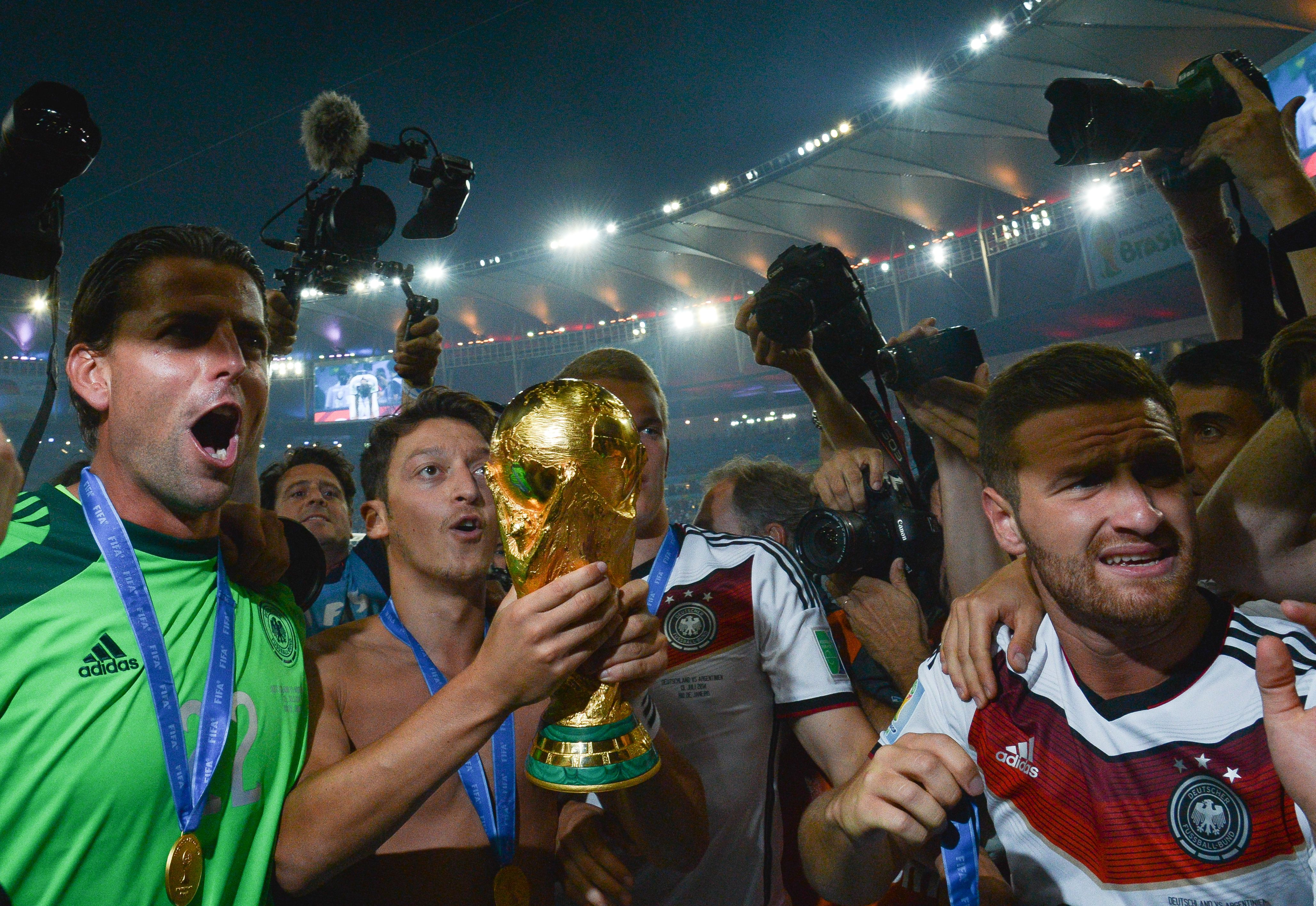
Germany's Mesut Özil holds the FIFA World Cup trophy designed by Gazzaniga after the 2014 World Cup Final

This Cup, unlike the Rimet Cup, will never be presented to the team that wins the World Cup three times, but will continue to be awarded as a prize until 2038, when all available inscription spaces for the winning nations are filled. Beginning with Germany in 1974, the trophy has been awarded three times to Germany (1974, 1990, and 2014) and Argentina (1978, 1986, and 2022); and twice to Italy (1982 and 2006), Brazil (1994 and 2002), France (1998 and 2018), and Spain (2010 and 2026).

Beginning with the 2006 World Cup Final in Germany, FIFA stipulated that the original trophy would not be awarded to the winning national team. In the past, the Cup was kept by the winning team at their national football association headquarters for four years. It was returned to FIFA only after the lots were drawn to determine the opposing teams. Today, the Cup is awarded to the captain of the winning team at the ceremony following the final game. After the festivities, the winning team receives a copy of the original Cup.

=== On his realized design for the FIFA World Cup ===
- "To create a universal symbol relating to sport and the harmony of world sport, I was inspired by two fundamental images: those of a triumphant athlete and of the world. I wanted to create a dynamic representation of an accomplishment that could express harmony, simplicity and peace simultaneously. The work should have clear bold lines and reflect the elation of the winning footballer – a man transformed by the enormity of his victory – but without the ego of the super human. This sporting hero who embraces the world in his arms, reflects the strength needed to make sacrifices day after day with his fellow team members and the universal characteristics of sport such as commitment and freedom."
- "The player feels the emotion, the excitement, the speed of action and the effort needed to be at the top of his game. He is the victorious, absolute hero and enthusiastically holds up the world of happiness. Whoever wins such a difficult competition takes on the dimensions of a giant with his prize at the moment of victory. The Cup must express all of these emotions."
- "With two players raising their arms, I wanted to celebrate the moment of joy and the excitement of victory. The sphere at the top is shaped with a relief reflecting the images of continents. This also symbolises football and the world and the lines showing between the two mirrored players expresses the energy of sport. The coarse surface between the two facing figures on the trophy expresses the intensity, vigour, energy and the competitive spirit of football."
- "Emerging from the base each detail comes together and rises and widens out to reach towards the world. A surge of energy springing from the compact base to encompass the figures of the two athletes at their moment of absolute victory."
- "If I ever have to re-create it, I would not make any changes to the original. The fact that the trophy still endures today in this changing world of fashions is a testament to the fact that I was inspired by beautiful symbols and universal principles that became part of my creation."

== Honours and awards ==
- Italy: Commander (Commendatore Ordine al Merito della Repubblica Italiana) Order of Merit of the Italian Republic (2012)

== See also ==
- Abel Lafleur
