= Theuley =

- Commune
- Location of Theuley
- Location within France Location within Bourgogne-Franche-Comté
- Coordinates: 47°37′25″N 5°48′07″E
- Country: France
- Region: Bourgogne-Franche-Comté
- Department: Haute-Saône
- Arrondissement: Vesoul
- Canton: Dampierre-sur-Salon

Government
  - Mayor (2020–2026): Françoise Riondel
- Area^{1}: 7.50 km^{2} (2.90 sq mi)
- Highest elevation: 262 m (860 ft)
- Lowest elevation: 202 m (663 ft)
- Population (2023): 105
  - Density: 14.0/km^{2} (36.3/sq mi)
- Time zone: UTC+01:00 (CET)
  - Summer (DST): UTC+02:00 (CEST)
- INSEE/Postal code: 70499 /70120
- ^{1} French Land Register data, which excludes lakes, ponds, glaciers > 1 km^{2} (0.386 sq mi or 247 acres) and river estuaries.

Theuley (French pronunciation: [tœlɛ]) is a commune in the Haute-Saône department in the region of Bourgogne-Franche-Comté in eastern France.

A hometown of Jules Rimet, Theuley dedicated a monument to him in 1998. It was inaugurated by the French Minister of Youth Affairs and Sports, Marie-George Buffet.

== See also ==
- Communes of the Haute-Saône department
