= 1966 theft of the Jules Rimet Trophy =

1966 theft of trophy for the FIFA World Cup

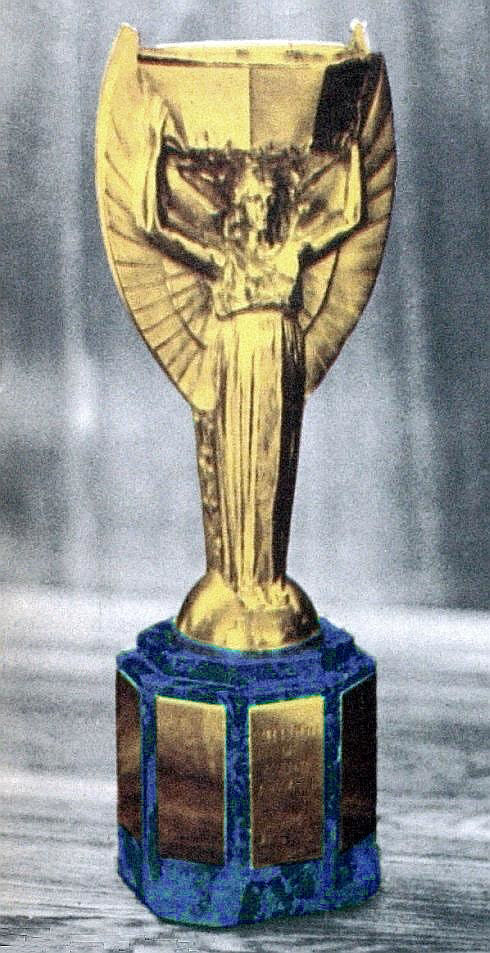
The Jules Rimet Trophy

The Jules Rimet Trophy, awarded to the winner of the football World Cup, was stolen in 1966 prior to the 1966 FIFA World Cup in England. The trophy was later recovered by a dog named Pickles who was later commended and gained a cult following for his heroism. One man was convicted for being involved but other possible culprits were never identified. The trophy was eventually won by the host nation England.

== Trophy placed in an exhibition ==
The Football Association had received the silver-gilt trophy in January 1966 before the scheduled World Cup tournament in July. It was usually kept in their headquarters at Lancaster Gate, apart from for a couple of publicity events. In February, Stanley Gibbons' stamp company received permission to place the Trophy in their Stampex exhibition in March on the condition that it would be under guard at all times. The trophy was also insured for £30,000 (despite its official value being only £3,000).

The exhibition was held in the Westminster Central Hall and opened on 19 March 1966, and the World Cup was a major attraction. Two uniformed officers guarded the trophy around the clock, reinforced by two plainclothes officers during the day. Additional guards stood beside the display cabinet when the exhibition was open, but nobody was watching the trophy all the time. On Sundays the Central Hall was used for Methodist services.

== Theft ==
On Sunday 20 March, the guards began a noon circuit. Around 12:10 p.m., they noticed that someone had forced open the display case and the rear doors of the building and stolen the trophy. The wooden bar that held the door closed was lying on the floor; thieves had removed the screws and bolts that held it from the other side of the door. They had removed the padlock from the back of the display case, taken the trophy and left the way they came. None of the guards had seen or heard anything suspicious, though one of them reported that he had seen a strange man by the public telephone when he had visited the lavatory on the first floor.

Scotland Yard took control of the case and gave it to the Flying Squad. Officers interviewed the guards and two maintenance workers. One of the churchgoers had also noticed a man and gave a different description. The story went public across the world over the next day. Police had begun to look for two potential suspects but the description the newspapers gave did not correspond to either one of the men the witnesses had seen.

== Ransom demand ==
On Monday, 21 March, Joe Mears, the Chairman of the Football Association, received an anonymous phone call. The unknown man said that Mears would receive a parcel at Chelsea Football Club the next day. The parcel was delivered to Mears' home. It contained the removable lining from the top of the trophy and a ransom note that demanded £15,000 in £1 and £5 notes. The letter stated that the FA should place a coded ad in the personal Ads column of The Evening News. If they followed the further instructions, they could get the trophy back by Friday; otherwise, or if the FA informed the police or the press, the thieves would melt the trophy down. Shortly afterwards, Mears received another call – a man who identified himself as "Jackson" changed the instructions to £5 and £10 notes.

Despite the warnings, Mears contacted the police, met Detective Inspector Charles Buggy of the Flying Squad, and gave the trophy lining and the letter to him. Police told Mears to place the ad on 24 March and contacted a bank that created a false ransom payment out of bundles of ordinary paper, with real money only at the top and bottom, which were placed in a suitcase. Two police officers were to act as Mears' assistants in handing the money over and went to his home to wait for the next call.

== Futile pursuit ==
Mears was suffering from an asthma attack so his wife answered instead and gave the phone to the "assistant McPhee" (who was DI Buggy). "Jackson" was nervous but finally agreed to arrange a switch and told "McPhee" to come to Battersea Park to meet him at the gate.

Buggy drove to the park, followed by a number of unmarked Flying Squad vehicles, and met "Jackson". Buggy showed him the suitcase and Jackson failed to notice that most of the money was scrap paper. Buggy insisted on seeing the trophy before handing over the money and said he feared that somebody would try to rob him. Jackson stepped into Buggy's car and agreed to lead him to the trophy.

On the way Jackson noticed the Flying Squad van that followed them and got nervous. At a traffic light in Kennington Park Road, he told Buggy to stop and said he was going to get the trophy. When he walked away, the van stopped Jackson and he disappeared around the corner. When Buggy intended to follow him, he reappeared and Buggy told him to get back to the car. Soon after Jackson jumped off the moving vehicle and ran away. Buggy pursued him first with a car and then on foot until he captured him in a house garden, revealed that he was a police officer and arrested him. Other officers came to escort Jackson to Kennington police station.

At the station, police recognised that "Jackson" was Edward Betchley, a petty thief and used car dealer who had been convicted of theft and receiving stolen goods. Betchley denied that he had stolen the cup and claimed that he could retrieve it if he was granted bail, which was denied. He was formally charged with the theft of the trophy and breaking and entering. Betchley claimed that someone he knew only as "The Pole" had offered him £500 to act as a middleman. Mrs Coombes, who had seen a strange man in the Central Hall, identified him but the security guard did not recognise him.

== Recovery of the trophy ==
On 27 March, David Corbett and his dog Pickles were walking in the Beulah Hill district of southeast London, when Pickles began to sniff at a parcel that was lying under the hedge of Corbett's house. It was wrapped in an old newspaper, tied with string. When he opened the parcel, he recognised the trophy when he noticed the winner's names on the bottom. He handed the parcel to the police at Gipsy Hill police station.

Police took Corbett and the trophy to Cannon Row police station where Harold Mayes of the FA identified the trophy. Police briefly suspected that Corbett was involved with the theft but he had an alibi.

Police announced the recovery of the trophy the next morning but retained the Cup as evidence until 18 April. They returned it to the FA before the opening of the tournament.

== Aftermath ==
Pickles briefly became a celebrity and appeared on TV and in some movies. David Corbett attended the players' celebration dinner after the World Cup final and later received rewards totalling £6,000. The Football Association made a replica of the trophy for public celebrations.

Edward Betchley was convicted of demanding money with menaces with intent to steal, and received concurrent sentences of two years. He died of emphysema in 1969.

In 2018, criminal investigative journalist Tom Pettifor identified the Jules Rimet Trophy thief as being Sidney Cugullere. Pettifor also revealed the sources of his investigations in a seven-part 2020 podcast series called Stealing Victory.

== In literature, media and popular culture ==
The theft of the Jules Rimet Trophy has been interpreted in the game Reverse: 1999, featuring Pickles as a playable character.

The Doctor Who Short Trip "This Sporting Life", an audio story by Big Finish Productions, revolves around the theft of the Trophy.

A café in the 2026 BBC production Small Prophets bore the name "Pickles", and featured photographs of the dog.

== See also ==
- 1983 theft of the Jules Rimet Trophy
