= FIFA World Cup Trophy =

Award for victors of the FIFA World Cup

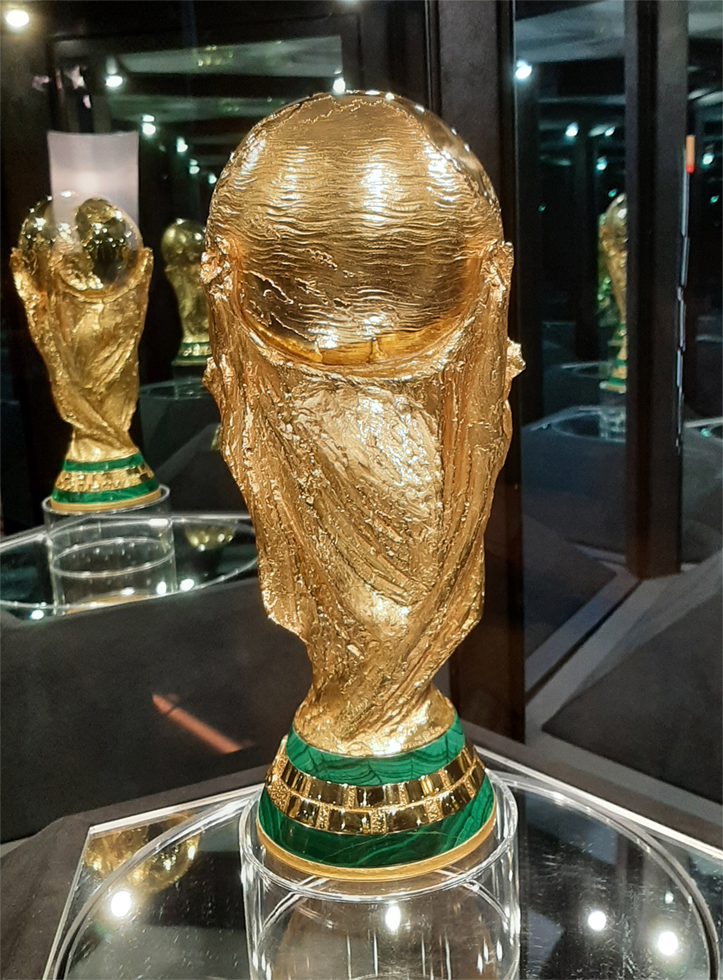
- Awarded for: Winning the FIFA World Cup
- Presented by: FIFA

History
- First award: 1930 (Jules Rimet Trophy); 1974 (FIFA World Cup Trophy)
- First winner: Uruguay (Jules Rimet Trophy, 1930); West Germany (FIFA World Cup Trophy, 1974)
- Most wins: Brazil (5 times)
- Most recent: Spain (2nd title, 2026)
- Website: fifa.com

The FIFA World Cup is a trophy made primarily of gold that is awarded to the winners of the FIFA World Cup association football tournament, which takes place every olympiad (four years). Since the advent of the World Cup in 1930, two different trophies have been used: the Jules Rimet Trophy from 1930 to 1970, and thereafter the FIFA World Cup Trophy from 1974 to the present day. As of June 2026, the material cost of the current trophy is estimated at US$713,000.

The first trophy, originally named Victory, but renamed in honor of FIFA president Jules Rimet, was made of gold plated sterling silver and a lapis lazuli base. It depicted Nike, the Greek goddess of victory. Brazil was awarded the trophy in perpetuity following their third title in 1970, prompting the commissioning of a replacement. The original Jules Rimet Trophy was stolen in 1983 and has never been recovered.

The subsequent trophy, called the "FIFA World Cup Trophy", was introduced in 1974. Made of 18 karat gold with bands of malachite on its base, it stands 36.8 centimetres (14.5 in) high and weighs 6.175 kilograms (13.61 lb). The trophy was made by the GDE Bertoni company in Italy. It depicts two human figures holding up the Earth. The current holders of the trophy are Spain, winners of the 2026 World Cup. The trophy is kept at the FIFA World Football Museum in Zürich, Switzerland, and leaves there only on select occasions.

Only a selected few are officially allowed to touch the trophy with bare hands, including players and managers who have won the competition, heads of state, and FIFA officials.

== Jules Rimet Trophy ==
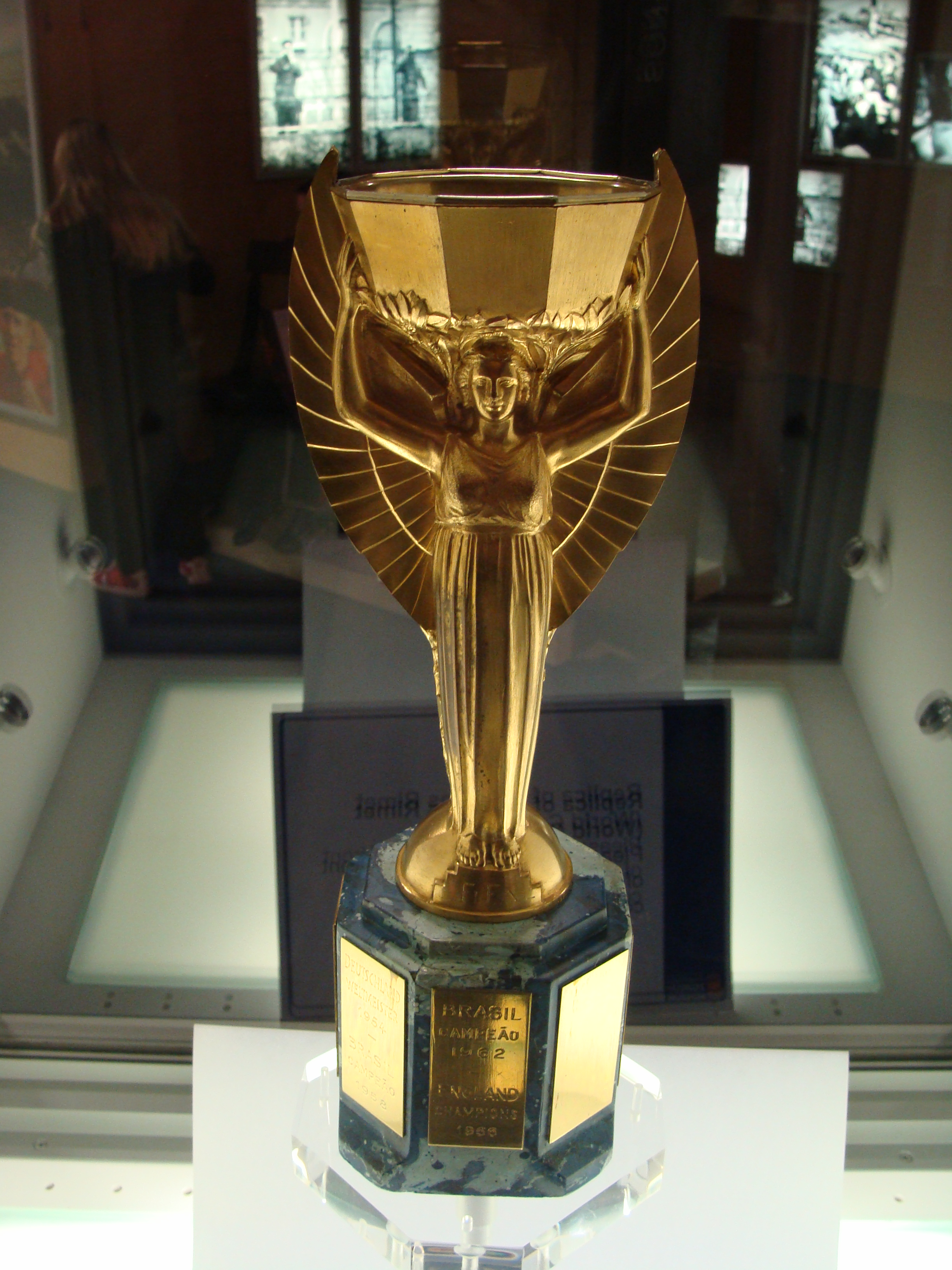
Jules Rimet Trophy replica on display in the English National Football Museum. The original was stolen from Brazil in 1983 and has never been recovered.

The Jules Rimet Trophy was the original trophy of the FIFA World Cup. Originally called "Victory", but generally known simply as the World Cup or Coupe du Monde, it was renamed in 1946 to honour the FIFA President Jules Rimet, who in 1929 passed a vote to initiate the competition. It was designed by French sculptor Abel Lafleur and made of gold-plated sterling silver on a lapis lazuli base. In 1954 the base was replaced with a taller version to accommodate more winners' details. It stood 35 centimetres (14 in) high and weighed 3.8 kilograms (8.4 lb). It comprised a decagonal cup, supported by a winged figure representing Nike, the ancient Greek goddess of victory.

The Jules Rimet Trophy was taken to Uruguay for the first FIFA World Cup aboard the Conte Verde, which set sail from Villefranche-sur-Mer, just southeast of Nice, in June 1930. This was the same ship that carried Jules Rimet and the footballers representing France, Romania, and Belgium who were participating in the tournament that year. The first team to be awarded the trophy was Uruguay, the winners of the 1930 World Cup.

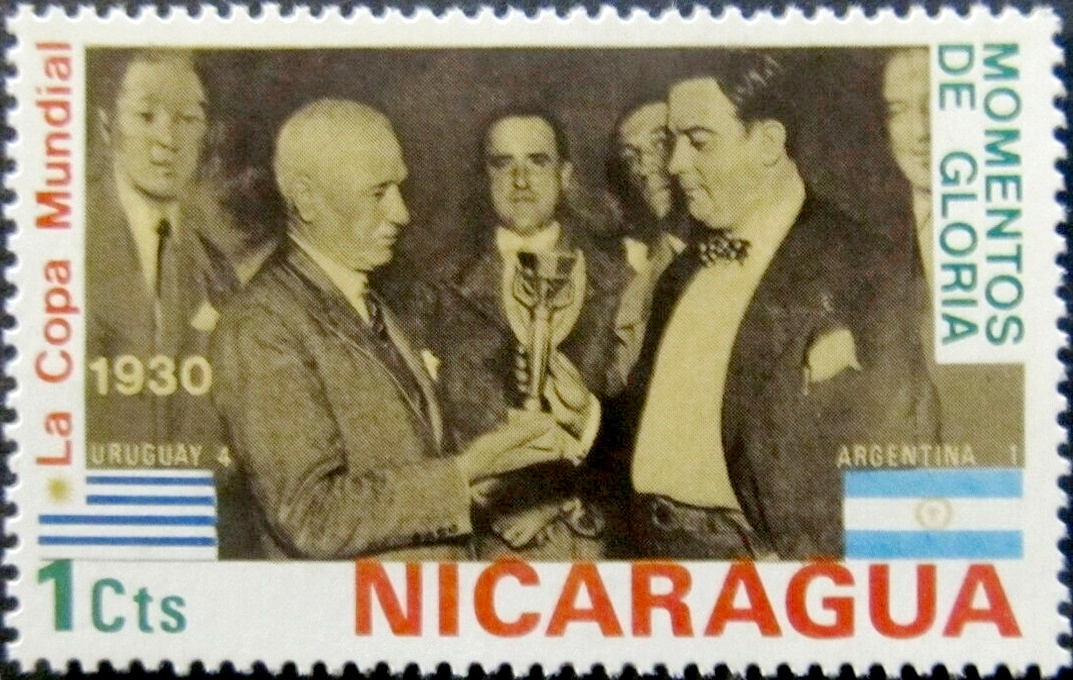
Jules Rimet presents the World Cup trophy to Raúl Jude, president of the Uruguayan Football Association, winners of the inaugural 1930 FIFA World Cup. This trophy was renamed for Rimet in 1946.

During World War II, the trophy was held by 1938 champion Italy. Ottorino Barassi, the Italian vice-president of FIFA and president of FIGC, secretly transported the trophy from a bank in Rome and hid it in a shoe-box under his bed to prevent the Nazis from taking it. The 1958 FIFA World Cup in Sweden marked the beginning of a tradition regarding the trophy. As Brazilian captain Hilderaldo Bellini heard photographers' requests for a better view of the Jules Rimet Trophy, he lifted it up in the air. Every cup-winning captain since has repeated the gesture.

On 20 March 1966, four months before the 1966 FIFA World Cup in England, the trophy was stolen during a public exhibition at Westminster Central Hall. It was found seven days later wrapped in newspaper at the bottom of a suburban garden hedge in Beulah Hill, Upper Norwood, south London, by a black and white collie dog named Pickles.

As a security measure, the (English) Football Association secretly manufactured a replica of the trophy for use in exhibitions rather than the original. This replica was used on occasions until the original trophy had to be handed back to FIFA for the next competition in 1970. Since FIFA had explicitly denied the FA permission to create a replica, the replica also had to disappear from public view and was for many years kept under its creator's bed. This replica was sold at an auction in 1997 for £254,500, when it was purchased by FIFA. The high auction price, 10 times the reserve price of £20,000–30,000, was led by speculation that the auctioned trophy was not the replica trophy but the original itself. Testing by FIFA confirmed the auctioned trophy was a replica. Soon afterwards FIFA arranged for the replica to be lent for display at the English National Football Museum, which was then based in Preston but is now in Manchester.

The Brazilian team won the tournament for the third time in 1970, allowing them to keep the real trophy in perpetuity, as had been stipulated by Jules Rimet in 1930. It was put on display at the Brazilian Football Confederation headquarters in Rio de Janeiro, in a cabinet with a front of bullet-proof glass.

On 19 December 1983, the trophy was stolen again. The wooden rear of the cabinet was forced open with a crowbar and the cup was taken. Four men were tried and convicted in absentia for the crime. The trophy has never been recovered, and it is widely believed to have been melted down into gold bars and sold. However, some believe the trophy was not melted down (as it did not actually contain enough gold to produce gold bars if melted down) and was instead sold onto the black market and may still exist.

Only one piece of the Jules Rimet Trophy has been found, the original base, which had been replaced in 1954. It was kept in a basement of FIFA's Zürich headquarters until it was rediscovered in 2014.

The Confederation commissioned a replica of their own, made by Eastman Kodak, using 1.8 kilograms (4.0 lb) of gold. This replica was presented to Brazilian military president João Figueiredo in 1984.

== New trophy ==
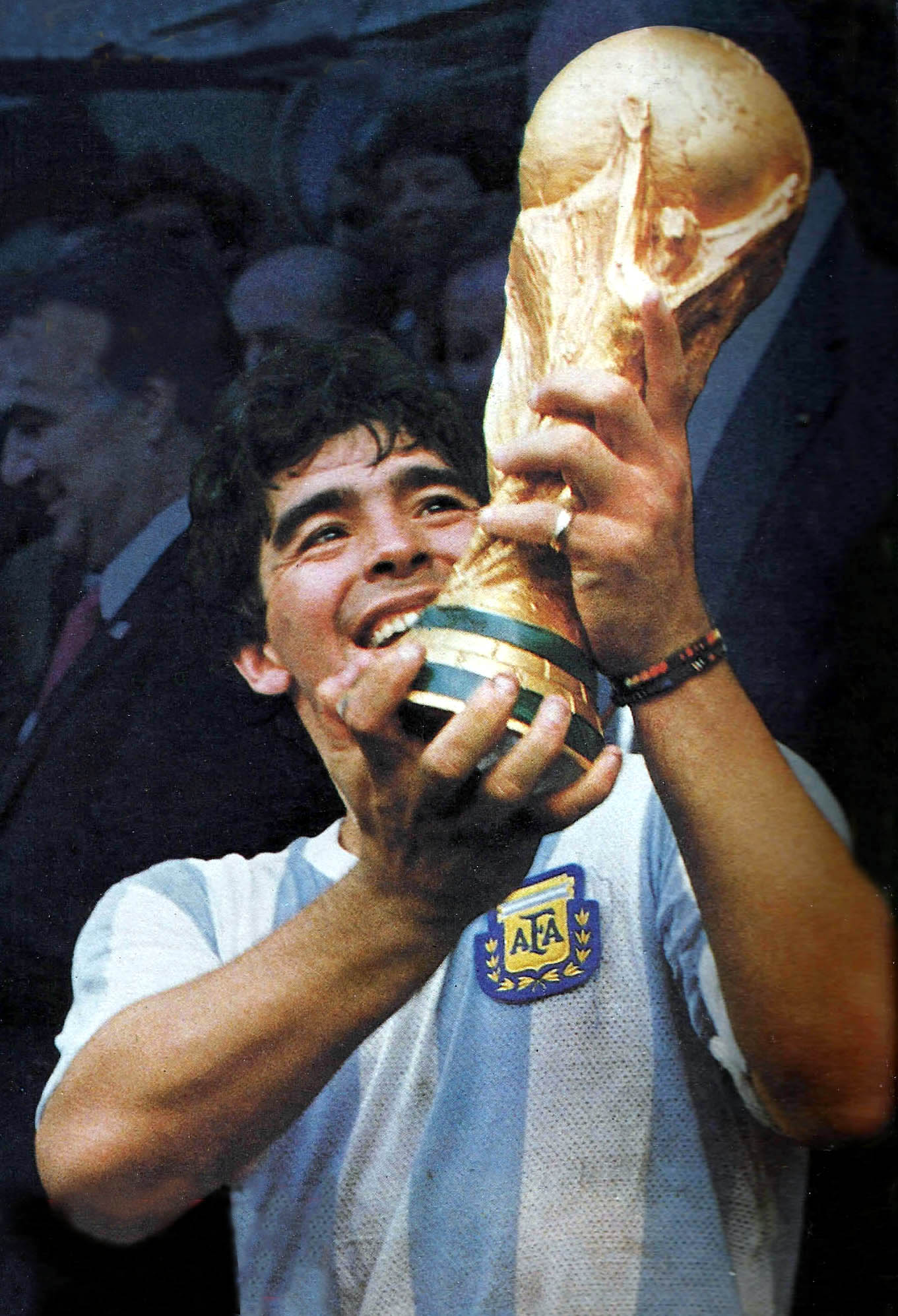
Diego Maradona (left) and Antoine Griezmann (right) with the trophy in 1986 and 2018, respectively

A replacement trophy was commissioned by FIFA for the 1974 World Cup. Fifty-three submissions were received from sculptors in seven countries. Italian artist Silvio Gazzaniga was awarded the commission. The trophy stands 36.8 centimetres (14.5 in) tall and is made of 18 karat gold. Its base is 13 centimetres (5.1 in) in diameter containing two layers of malachite, with the trophy weighing 6.175 kilograms (13.61 lb) in total.

Produced by GDE Bertoni in Paderno Dugnano, it depicts two human figures holding up the Earth. Gazzaniga described the trophy thus, "The lines spring out from the base, rising in spirals, stretching out to receive the world. From the remarkable dynamic tensions of the compact body of the sculpture rise the figures of two athletes at the stirring moment of victory". The technique used to make it is called lost wax casting.

The trophy has the engraving "FIFA World Cup" on its base. After the 1994 FIFA World Cup, a plate was added to the bottom side of the trophy where the names of winning countries are engraved, names therefore not visible when the trophy is standing upright. The inscriptions state the year in figures and the name of the winning nation in its national language – for example, "1974 Deutschland" or "1994 Brasil". In 2010, the name of the winning nation was engraved as "2010 Spain" in English, not in Spanish. This was corrected in the new plate made after the 2018 World Cup. As of 2022, twelve winners have been engraved on the base. The plate is replaced each World Cup cycle and the names of the trophy winners are rearranged into a spiral to accommodate future winners.

In 2010, chemist Sir Martyn Poliakoff claimed that the trophy must be hollow, because if it were solid gold it would weigh 70–80 kilograms (150–180 lb) and be too heavy to lift; the trophy's original manufacturer has since confirmed its hollowness. The trophy has received a new layer of gold plating, while its green malachite bands have been repaired on several occasions.

The FIFA World Cup Original Trophy is now permanently kept at the FIFA World Football Museum in Zürich, Switzerland. It leaves there only when it goes on its FIFA World Cup Trophy Tour. It is present at the Final draw for the next World Cup, and on the pitch at the World Cup opening game and Final. The FIFA World Cup Trophy Tour was inaugurated for the 2006 FIFA World Cup competition.

== Winners ==
Historic list of all holders of the trophy (winners of the FIFA World Cup).

Jules Rimet Trophy

- Brazil – 1958, 1962, 1970
- Uruguay – 1930, 1950
- Italy – 1934, 1938
- West Germany – 1954
- England – 1966

FIFA World Cup Trophy

- West Germany / Germany – 1974, 1990, 2014
- Argentina – 1978, 1986, 2022
- Italy – 1982, 2006
- Brazil – 1994, 2002
- France – 1998, 2018
- Spain – 2010, 2026

== See also ==
- FIFA Women's World Cup trophy
- FIFA Champions Badge
