= 1983 theft of the Jules Rimet Trophy =

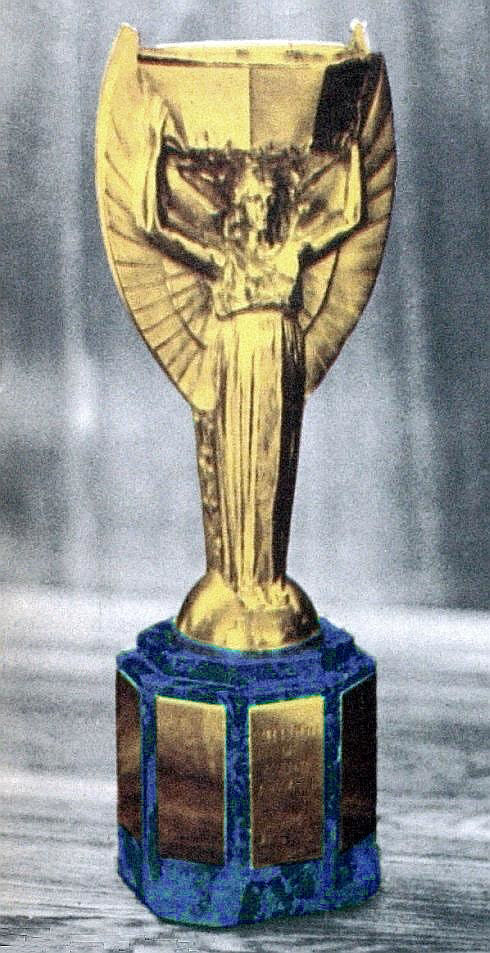
The Jules Rimet Trophy (colorized photo from 1966)

The Jules Rimet Trophy, the original trophy of the FIFA World Cup, was stolen for the second time in 1983. Unlike the first theft in 1966, the trophy has never been recovered.

In 1970, Brazil received the Jules Rimet Trophy in perpetuity after winning the World Cup for a third time, but on 19 December 1983 the trophy was again stolen. A banker and football club agent (although the club, Clube Atlético Mineiro, denies his employment) called Sérgio Pereira Ayres (also known as "Sérgio Peralta") was the mastermind of the theft. Peralta engaged two other men, an ex-police officer called Francisco Rivera (a.k.a. "Chico Barbudo") and a decorator, José Luiz Vieira (a.k.a. "Luiz Bigode"). The two men entered the Brazilian Football Confederation (CBF)'s building and, after incapacitating the night watchman, stole the trophy and two other trophies, "Equitativa" and "Jurrito". A safecracker, Antonio Setta (a.k.a. "Broa"), revealed that Peralta had also approached him for the job, but he refused out of patriotism and because his brother had died of a heart attack when Brazil won the Jules Rimet Trophy.

Peralta and the rest of the suspects were arrested, and it was claimed that the trophy was melted into gold bars by Juan Carlos Hernández, an Argentine gold dealer. Hernández denied the accusation, and the traces of gold found after an analysis of his foundry did not match the material of the trophy. In addition, doubts were raised because the trophy was not made of solid gold; it could not be melted into gold bars, and according to Pedro Berwanger, the Brazilian federal police officer who led the original investigation, it would be worth much more if left intact. He and others believe the trophy may have been sold on the black market.

Hernández was arrested, along with the suspects, but when they received their sentences, they all fled. Chico Barbudo was shot to death in 1989 by five men in a bar. Luiz Bigode was re-arrested and freed from jail in 1998. Antonio Setta died in a car crash in 1985, as he was going to the police central to testify on the crime. Juan Carlos Hernández, who had bought a luxurious estate in the upper-class Rio neighborhood of Humaitá shortly after the theft, fled to France and was arrested in 1998 at a bus station in São Paulo for drug trafficking (he had also served jail time in France for the same offence). He was freed from jail in 2005, having never served the penalty for receiving stolen goods that he would incur for the trophy. The mastermind, Sérgio Peralta, was freed from jail in 1998. He died of a heart attack in 2003.

The trophy has never been recovered. Instead, a replica of the Jules Rimet Trophy was presented to the CBF in 1984.

== See also ==
- 1966 theft of the Jules Rimet Trophy
