= Pickles (dog) =

Dog that found the stolen Jules Rimet Trophy

- Species: Canis familiaris
- Breed: Mixed Breed Collie
- Sex: Male
- Born: 1962
- Died: 1 January 1967 (aged 5)
- Known for: Finding the missing Jules Rimet Trophy
- Owner: David Corbett
- Awards: National Canine Defence League (silver medal)

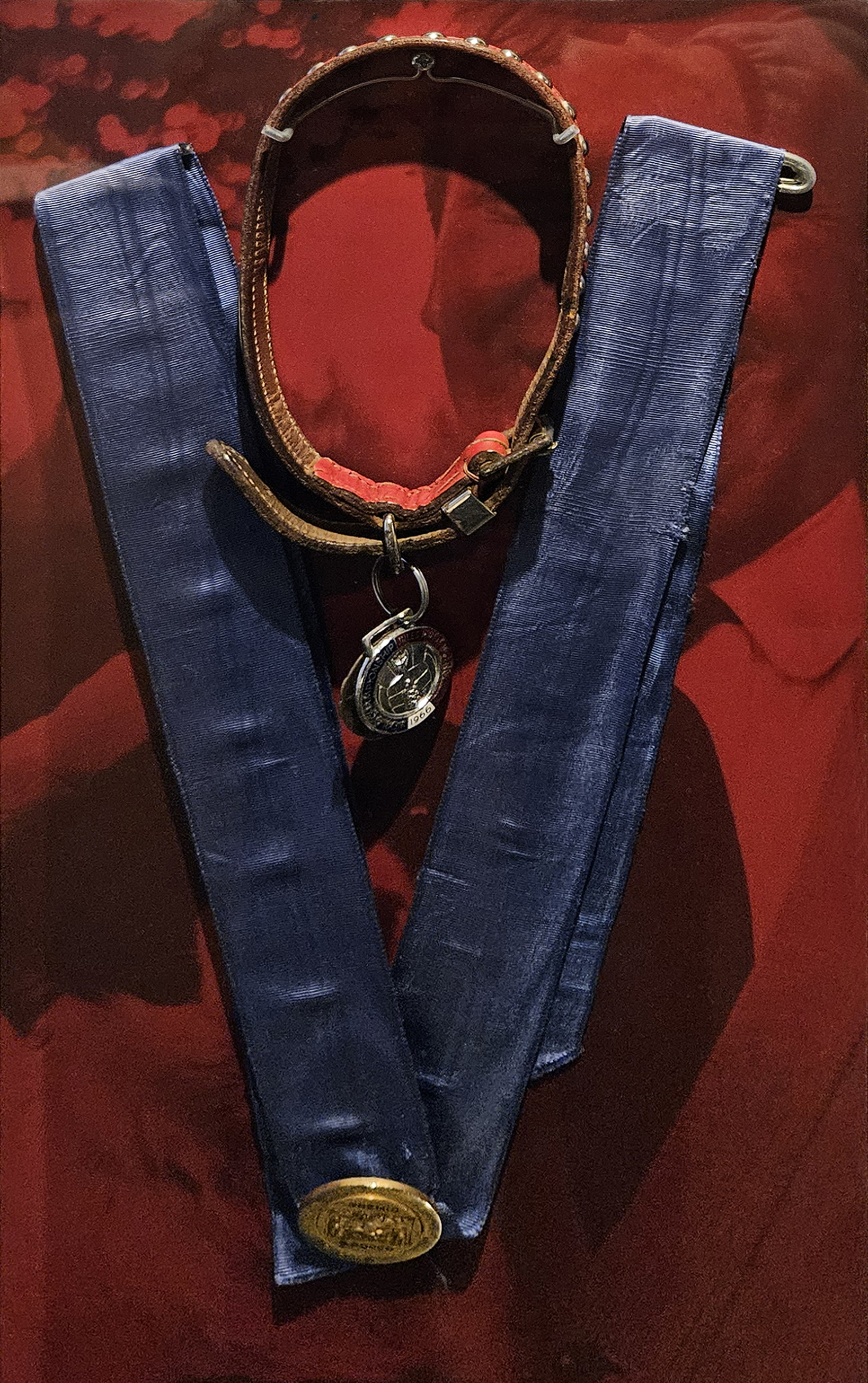
Pickles' collar with fobs presented by grateful fans and a medal awarded by the Italian Canine Defence League

Pickles (1962 – 1967) was a black and white collie dog, known for his role in finding the stolen Jules Rimet Trophy in March 1966, four months before the 1966 FIFA World Cup was scheduled to begin in England.

== Trophy theft ==
The World Cup trophy was stolen on the afternoon of Sunday 20 March 1966. It had been on public display in a glass cabinet during the "Sport with Stamps" Stanley Gibbons Stampex rare stamp exhibition at Methodist Central Hall in Westminster. The thief evaded the round-the-clock security, and ignored rare stamps with a value of £3 million to steal the silver-gilt trophy, which was generally thought to be worth far less.

A telephone call from a man who called himself "Jackson" to Joe Mears, chairman of Chelsea F.C. and The Football Association, alerted him that a package would be left at Stamford Bridge the following day: it contained a £15,000 ransom demand, accompanied by the removable lining from the top of the trophy. The package was turned over to the police, who arranged to meet "Jackson". However, when they arrested the man who had mailed the package, whose real name was Edward Betchley, he claimed that he was a middleman, and that the real culprit was a man he called "The Pole". Betchley was eventually convicted for demanding money with menace, and sentenced to two years' imprisonment. If indeed there were other persons involved in the theft, no one else has ever been found.

== Recovery ==
The rest of the trophy was found on Sunday 27 March, just seven days after it was stolen, wrapped in newspaper lying by the front wheel of a parked car in Beulah Hill, Upper Norwood, south London, by the four-year-old Pickles, while taking a walk with his owner, David Corbett, who worked as a Thames lighterman. Corbett briefly fell under suspicion of involvement in the theft. When England won the trophy, Pickles was invited to the celebration banquet as a reward.

Corbett collected nearly £5,000 (equivalent to £81,000 in 2025) as a reward. He used the money to buy a house in Lingfield, Surrey in 1967. Pickles was awarded the silver medal of the National Canine Defence League.

The Football Association had a replica of the cup made in base metal (for publicity use) so the gold-plated original could be kept safe. The original cup was awarded permanently to Brazil after the 1970 FIFA World Cup but it was stolen from the headquarters of the Brazilian Football Confederation in Rio de Janeiro in December 1983 and never recovered. The replica was bought by FIFA at an auction in 1997 for £254,000, and it is held by the National Football Museum in Manchester.

== Later life ==
Pickles starred with Eric Sykes and June Whitfield in the 1966 film The Spy with a Cold Nose. He also appeared on several television programmes including Blue Peter. He was named "Dog of the Year" and awarded a year of free food by pet food manufacturer Spillers.

Pickles died in 1967 when he was strangled by his choke chain lead that caught on a tree branch while he was chasing a cat near his new home in Surrey. He was buried in his owner's back garden and his collar is on display in the National Football Museum in Manchester.

== Legacy ==
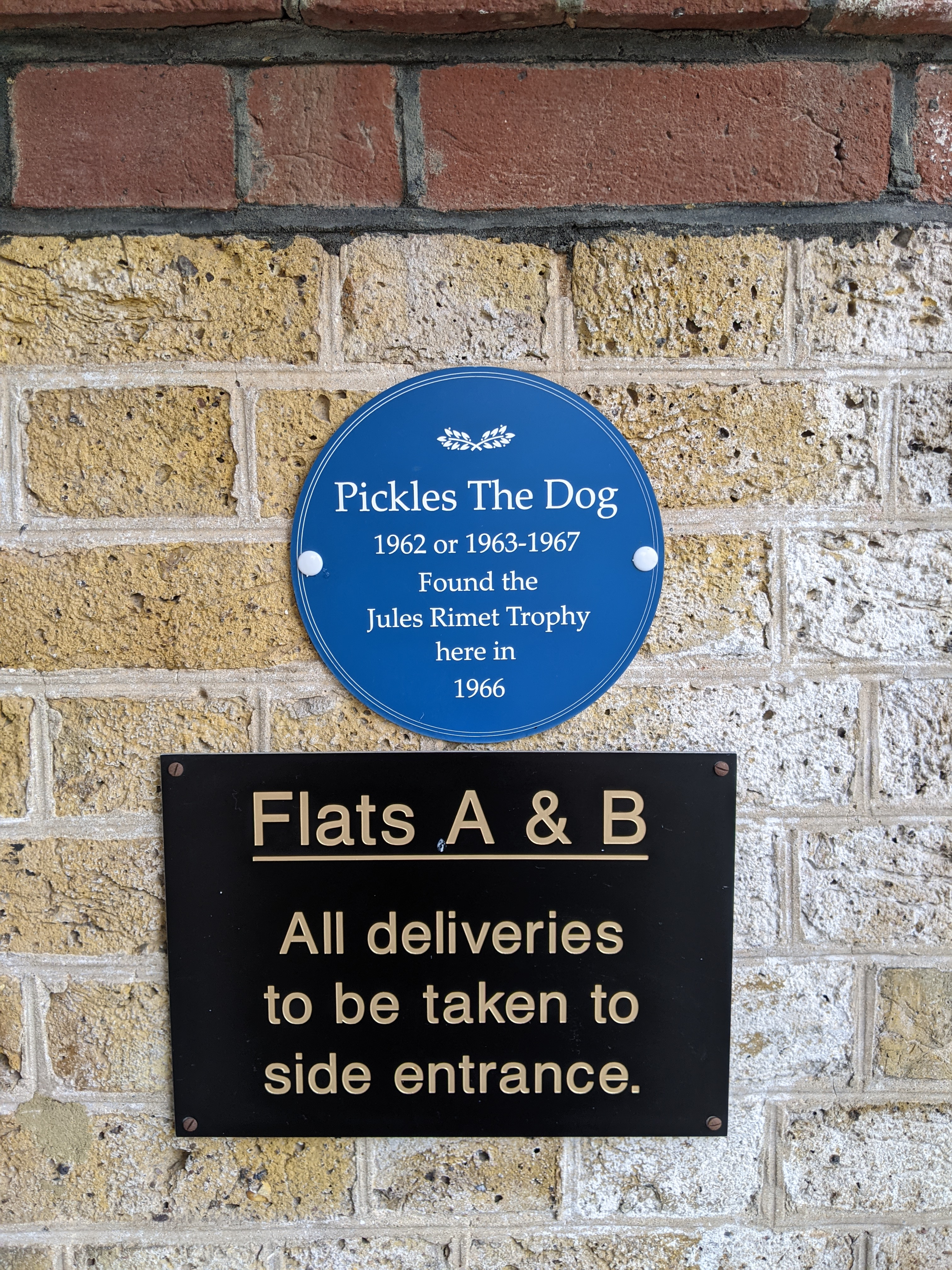
Plaque for Pickles on Beulah Hill, Upper Norwood

A fictional version of the story was told in a 2006 ITV drama written by Michael Chaplin, called Pickles: The Dog Who Won the World Cup; Pickles was voiced by Harry Enfield.

A plaque was installed during England's 2018 World Cup campaign in woodland near the spot where Pickles found the trophy on Beulah Hill, Upper Norwood. The plaque was commissioned and put up by Adam Thoroughgood, a local resident. It was later relocated to the doorway of the St Valery flats.

The game Reverse: 1999 features Pickles as a playable character, with an interpretation of the theft of the Trophy as part of its 1.1 patch story.

== See also ==
- List of individual dogs
