= 1966 FIFA World Cup squads =

Below are the squads for the 1966 FIFA World Cup final tournament in England. Spain (3), West Germany (3) and France (2) had players representing foreign clubs.

== Group 1 ==
=== England ===
Head coach: Alf Ramsey

No.	Pos.	Player	Date of birth (age)	Caps	Club
1	GK	Gordon Banks	30 December 1937 (aged 28)	27	(England) Leicester City
2	DF	George Cohen	22 October 1939 (aged 26)	24	(England) Fulham
3	DF	Ray Wilson	17 December 1934 (aged 31)	45	(England) Everton
4	MF	Nobby Stiles	18 May 1942 (aged 24)	14	(England) Manchester United
5	DF	Jack Charlton	8 May 1935 (aged 31)	16	(England) Leeds United
6	DF	Bobby Moore (captain)	12 April 1941 (aged 25)	41	(England) West Ham United
7	MF	Alan Ball	12 May 1945 (aged 21)	10	(England) Blackpool
8	FW	Jimmy Greaves	20 February 1940 (aged 26)	51	(England) Tottenham Hotspur
9	MF	Bobby Charlton	11 October 1937 (aged 28)	68	(England) Manchester United
10	FW	Geoff Hurst	8 December 1941 (aged 24)	5	(England) West Ham United
11	FW	John Connelly	18 July 1938 (aged 27)	19	(England) Manchester United
12	GK	Ron Springett	22 July 1935 (aged 30)	33	(England) Sheffield Wednesday
13	GK	Peter Bonetti	27 September 1941 (aged 24)	1	(England) Chelsea
14	DF	Jimmy Armfield	21 September 1935 (aged 30)	43	(England) Blackpool
15	DF	Gerry Byrne	29 August 1938 (aged 27)	2	(England) Liverpool
16	MF	Martin Peters	8 November 1943 (aged 22)	3	(England) West Ham United
17	MF	Ron Flowers	28 July 1934 (aged 31)	49	(England) Wolverhampton Wanderers
18	DF	Norman Hunter	29 October 1943 (aged 22)	4	(England) Leeds United
19	FW	Terry Paine	23 March 1939 (aged 27)	18	(England) Southampton
20	MF	Ian Callaghan	10 April 1942 (aged 24)	1	(England) Liverpool
21	FW	Roger Hunt	20 July 1938 (aged 27)	13	(England) Liverpool
22	MF	George Eastham	23 September 1936 (aged 29)	19	(England) Arsenal

=== France ===
Head coach: Henri Guérin

No.	Pos.	Player	Date of birth (age)	Caps	Club
1	GK	Marcel Aubour	17 June 1940 (aged 26)	11	(France) Lyon
2	DF	Marcel Artelesa (captain)	2 July 1938 (aged 28)	17	(France) Monaco
3	FW	Edmond Baraffe	19 October 1942 (aged 23)	3	(France) Toulouse
4	MF	Joseph Bonnel	4 January 1939 (aged 27)	18	(France) Valenciennes
5	DF	Bernard Bosquier	19 June 1942 (aged 24)	9	(France) Sochaux
6	DF	Robert Budzynski	21 May 1940 (aged 26)	4	(France) Nantes
7	DF	André Chorda	20 February 1938 (aged 28)	20	(France) Girondins de Bordeaux
8	FW	Nestor Combin	29 December 1940 (aged 25)	6	(Italy) Varese
9	FW	Didier Couécou	25 July 1944 (aged 21)	0	(France) Girondins de Bordeaux
10	DF	Héctor De Bourgoing	23 July 1934 (aged 31)	2	(France) Girondins de Bordeaux
11	DF	Gabriel De Michele	6 March 1941 (aged 25)	0	(France) Nantes
12	DF	Jean Djorkaeff	27 October 1939 (aged 26)	7	(France) Lyon
13	FW	Philippe Gondet	17 May 1942 (aged 24)	5	(France) Nantes
14	FW	Gérard Hausser	18 March 1939 (aged 27)	9	(France) Strasbourg
15	MF	Yves Herbet	17 August 1945 (aged 20)	4	(France) Sedan
16	MF	Robert Herbin	30 March 1939 (aged 27)	17	(France) Saint-Étienne
17	MF	Lucien Muller	3 September 1934 (aged 31)	16	(Spain) Barcelona
18	DF	Jean-Claude Piumi	27 May 1940 (aged 26)	2	(France) Valenciennes
19	FW	Laurent Robuschi	5 October 1935 (aged 30)	4	(France) Girondins de Bordeaux
20	MF	Jacques Simon	25 March 1941 (aged 25)	5	(France) Nantes
21	GK	Georges Carnus	13 August 1942 (aged 23)	1	(France) Stade Français
22	GK	Johnny Schuth	7 December 1941 (aged 24)	0	(France) Strasbourg

=== Mexico ===
Head coach: Ignacio Tréllez

No.	Pos.	Player	Date of birth (age)	Caps	Club
1	GK	Antonio Carbajal	7 June 1929 (aged 37)	46	(Mexico) León
2	DF	Arturo Chaires	14 March 1937 (aged 29)	19	(Mexico) Guadalajara
3	DF	Gustavo Peña (captain)	22 November 1941 (aged 24)	24	(Mexico) Oro
4	DF	Jesús del Muro	30 November 1937 (aged 28)	29	(Mexico) Veracruz
5	DF	Ignacio Jáuregui	31 July 1938 (aged 27)	28	(Mexico) Monterrey
6	MF	Isidoro Díaz	14 March 1940 (aged 26)	34	(Mexico) Guadalajara
7	MF	Felipe Ruvalcaba	16 February 1941 (aged 25)	21	(Mexico) Oro
8	FW	Aarón Padilla	10 July 1942 (aged 24)	16	(Mexico) Pumas UNAM
9	FW	Ernesto Cisneros	26 October 1940 (aged 25)	14	(Mexico) Atlas
10	FW	Javier Fragoso	19 April 1942 (aged 24)	13	(Mexico) Club América
11	FW	Francisco Jara	3 February 1941 (aged 25)	6	(Mexico) Guadalajara
12	GK	Ignacio Calderón	13 December 1943 (aged 22)	14	(Mexico) Guadalajara
13	MF	José Luis González	14 September 1942 (aged 23)	7	(Mexico) Necaxa
14	DF	Gabriel Núñez	6 February 1942 (aged 24)	6	(Mexico) Zacatepec
15	DF	Guillermo Hernández	25 June 1942 (aged 24)	5	(Mexico) Atlas
16	MF	Luis Regueiro	22 December 1943 (aged 22)	1	(Mexico) Pumas UNAM
17	MF	Magdaleno Mercado	4 April 1944 (aged 22)	4	(Mexico) Atlas
18	MF	Elías Muñoz	3 November 1941 (aged 24)	3	(Mexico) Pumas UNAM
19	FW	Salvador Reyes	20 September 1936 (aged 29)	46	(Mexico) Guadalajara
20	FW	Enrique Borja	20 December 1945 (aged 20)	1	(Mexico) Pumas UNAM
21	FW	Ramiro Navarro	25 May 1943 (aged 23)	4	(Mexico) Oro
22	GK	Javier Vargas	22 November 1941 (aged 24)	2	(Mexico) Atlas

=== Uruguay ===
Head coach: Ondino Viera

No.	Pos.	Player	Date of birth (age)	Caps	Club
1	GK	Ladislao Mazurkiewicz	14 February 1945 (aged 21)	5	(Uruguay) Peñarol
2	DF	Horacio Troche (captain)	14 February 1936 (aged 30)	24	(Uruguay) Cerro
3	DF	Jorge Manicera	4 November 1938 (aged 27)	15	(Uruguay) Nacional
4	MF	Pablo Forlán	14 July 1945 (aged 20)	2	(Uruguay) Peñarol
5	DF	Néstor Gonçalves	27 April 1936 (aged 30)	37	(Uruguay) Peñarol
6	MF	Omar Caetano	8 November 1938 (aged 27)	12	(Uruguay) Peñarol
7	MF	Julio César Cortés	29 March 1941 (aged 25)	11	(Uruguay) Peñarol
8	FW	José Urruzmendi	25 August 1944 (aged 21)	12	(Uruguay) Nacional
9	FW	José Sasía	27 December 1933 (aged 32)	41	(Uruguay) Defensor Sporting
10	FW	Pedro Rocha	3 December 1942 (aged 23)	20	(Uruguay) Peñarol
11	FW	Domingo Pérez	7 June 1936 (aged 30)	20	(Uruguay) Nacional
12	GK	Roberto Sosa	14 June 1935 (aged 31)	19	(Uruguay) Nacional
13	DF	Nelson Díaz	12 January 1942 (aged 24)	8	(Uruguay) Peñarol
14	DF	Emilio Álvarez	10 February 1939 (aged 27)	15	(Uruguay) Nacional
15	DF	Luis Ubiña	7 June 1940 (aged 26)	4	(Uruguay) Rampla Juniors
16	DF	Eliseo Álvarez	9 August 1940 (aged 25)	6	(Uruguay) Rampla Juniors
17	MF	Héctor Salvá	27 November 1939 (aged 26)	6	(Uruguay) Danubio
18	FW	Milton Viera	11 May 1946 (aged 20)	2	(Uruguay) Nacional
19	MF	Héctor Silva	1 February 1940 (aged 26)	18	(Uruguay) Peñarol
20	DF	Luis Ramos	9 October 1939 (aged 26)	2	(Uruguay) Nacional
21	MF	Víctor Espárrago	6 October 1944 (aged 21)	6	(Uruguay) Nacional
22	GK	Walter Taibo	7 March 1931 (aged 35)	31	(Uruguay) Peñarol

== Group 2 ==
=== Argentina ===
Head coach: Juan Carlos Lorenzo

No.	Pos.	Player	Date of birth (age)	Caps	Club
1	GK	Antonio Roma	13 July 1932 (aged 33)	33	(Argentina) Boca Juniors
2	GK	Rolando Irusta	27 March 1938 (aged 28)	0	(Argentina) Lanús
3	GK	Hugo Gatti	19 August 1944 (aged 21)	0	(Argentina) River Plate
4	DF	Roberto Perfumo	3 October 1942 (aged 23)	4	(Argentina) Racing Club
5	MF	José Varacka	27 May 1932 (aged 34)	26	(Argentina) San Lorenzo
6	MF	Oscar Calics	18 November 1939 (aged 26)	0	(Argentina) San Lorenzo
7	DF	Silvio Marzolini	4 October 1940 (aged 25)	13	(Argentina) Boca Juniors
8	DF	Roberto Ferreiro	25 April 1935 (aged 31)	15	(Argentina) Independiente
9	DF	Carmelo Simeone	22 September 1934 (aged 31)	21	(Argentina) Boca Juniors
10	MF	Antonio Rattín (captain)	16 May 1937 (aged 29)	26	(Argentina) Boca Juniors
11	MF	José Omar Pastoriza	23 May 1942 (aged 24)	0	(Argentina) Independiente
12	MF	Rafael Albrecht	23 August 1941 (aged 24)	20	(Argentina) San Lorenzo
13	DF	Nelson López	24 June 1941 (aged 25)	0	(Argentina) Banfield
14	FW	Mario Chaldú	6 June 1942 (aged 24)	5	(Argentina) San Lorenzo
15	MF	Jorge Solari	11 November 1941 (aged 24)	1	(Argentina) River Plate
16	FW	Alberto González	21 August 1941 (aged 24)	10	(Argentina) Boca Juniors
17	MF	Juan Carlos Sarnari	22 January 1942 (aged 24)	0	(Argentina) River Plate
18	FW	Alfredo Rojas	20 February 1937 (aged 29)	11	(Argentina) Boca Juniors
19	FW	Luis Artime	2 December 1938 (aged 27)	16	(Argentina) Independiente
20	FW	Ermindo Onega	30 April 1940 (aged 26)	24	(Argentina) River Plate
21	FW	Oscar Más	29 October 1946 (aged 19)	9	(Argentina) River Plate
22	FW	Aníbal Tarabini	4 August 1941 (aged 24)	1	(Argentina) Independiente

=== Spain ===
Head coach: José Villalonga

No.	Pos.	Player	Date of birth (age)	Caps	Club
1	GK	José Ángel Iribar	1 March 1943 (aged 23)	9	(Spain) Atlético Bilbao
2	DF	Manuel Sanchís	26 March 1938 (aged 28)	2	(Spain) Real Madrid
3	DF	Eladio Silvestre	18 November 1940 (aged 25)	1	(Spain) Barcelona
4	MF	Luis del Sol	6 April 1935 (aged 31)	14	(Italy) Juventus
5	MF	Ignacio Zoco	31 July 1939 (aged 26)	19	(Spain) Real Madrid
6	MF	Jesús Glaría	2 January 1942 (aged 24)	7	(Spain) Atlético Madrid
7	MF	José Ufarte	17 May 1941 (aged 25)	6	(Spain) Atlético Madrid
8	FW	Amancio	16 October 1939 (aged 26)	9	(Spain) Real Madrid
9	FW	Marcelino	29 April 1940 (aged 26)	12	(Spain) Zaragoza
10	FW	Luis Suárez	2 May 1935 (aged 31)	29	(Italy) Internazionale
11	FW	Paco Gento (captain)	21 October 1933 (aged 32)	36	(Spain) Real Madrid
12	GK	Antonio Betancort	13 March 1938 (aged 28)	2	(Spain) Real Madrid
13	GK	Miguel Reina	24 January 1946 (aged 20)	0	(Spain) Córdoba
14	DF	Feliciano Rivilla	21 August 1936 (aged 29)	26	(Spain) Atlético Madrid
15	DF	Severino Reija	25 November 1938 (aged 27)	11	(Spain) Zaragoza
16	DF	Ferran Olivella	22 June 1936 (aged 30)	18	(Spain) Barcelona
17	DF	Gallego	4 March 1944 (aged 22)	0	(Spain) Barcelona
18	MF	Pirri	11 March 1945 (aged 21)	0	(Spain) Real Madrid
19	MF	Josep Maria Fusté	15 April 1941 (aged 25)	5	(Spain) Barcelona
20	MF	Joaquín Peiró	29 January 1936 (aged 30)	10	(Italy) Internazionale
21	MF	Adelardo	26 September 1939 (aged 26)	10	(Spain) Atlético Madrid
22	FW	Carlos Lapetra	29 November 1938 (aged 27)	12	(Spain) Zaragoza

=== Switzerland ===
Head coach: (Italy) Alfredo Foni

No.	Pos.	Player	Date of birth (age)	Caps	Club
1	GK	Karl Elsener	13 August 1934 (aged 31)	32	(Switzerland) Lausanne-Sport
2	DF	Willy Allemann	10 June 1942 (aged 24)	1	(Switzerland) Grenchen
3	DF	Kurt Armbruster	16 September 1934 (aged 31)	3	(Switzerland) Lausanne-Sport
4	MF	Heinz Bäni	18 November 1936 (aged 29)	7	(Switzerland) Zürich
5	DF	René Brodmann (captain)	25 October 1933 (aged 32)	3	(Switzerland) Zürich
6	MF	Richard Dürr	1 December 1938 (aged 27)	17	(Switzerland) Lausanne-Sport
7	MF	Hansruedi Führer	24 December 1937 (aged 28)	6	(Switzerland) Young Boys
8	MF	Vittore Gottardi	24 September 1941 (aged 24)	0	(Switzerland) Lugano
9	MF	André Grobéty	22 June 1933 (aged 33)	39	(Switzerland) Lausanne-Sport
10	FW	Robert Hosp	13 December 1939 (aged 26)	11	(Switzerland) Lausanne-Sport
11	FW	Köbi Kuhn	12 October 1943 (aged 22)	18	(Switzerland) Zürich
12	GK	Léo Eichmann	24 December 1936 (aged 29)	1	(Switzerland) La Chaux-de-Fonds
13	FW	Fritz Künzli	8 January 1946 (aged 20)	2	(Switzerland) Zürich
14	DF	Werner Leimgruber	2 September 1934 (aged 31)	9	(Switzerland) Zürich
15	MF	Karl Odermatt	17 December 1942 (aged 23)	6	(Switzerland) Basel
16	FW	René-Pierre Quentin	5 August 1943 (aged 22)	7	(Switzerland) Sion
17	FW	Jean-Claude Schindelholz	11 October 1940 (aged 25)	10	(Switzerland) Servette
18	DF	Heinz Schneiter	12 April 1935 (aged 31)	43	(Switzerland) Young Boys
19	MF	Xavier Stierli	29 October 1940 (aged 25)	7	(Switzerland) Zürich
20	DF	Ely Tacchella	25 May 1936 (aged 30)	26	(Switzerland) Lausanne-Sport
21	MF	Georges Vuilleumier	21 September 1944 (aged 21)	5	(Switzerland) Lausanne-Sport
22	GK	Mario Prosperi	4 August 1945 (aged 20)	3	(Switzerland) Lugano

=== West Germany ===
Head coach: Helmut Schön

No.	Pos.	Player	Date of birth (age)	Caps	Club
1	GK	Hans Tilkowski	12 July 1935 (aged 30)	32	(West Germany) Borussia Dortmund
2	DF	Horst-Dieter Höttges	10 September 1943 (aged 22)	13	(West Germany) Werder Bremen
3	DF	Karl-Heinz Schnellinger	31 March 1939 (aged 27)	31	(Italy) Milan
4	MF	Franz Beckenbauer	11 September 1945 (aged 20)	8	(West Germany) Bayern Munich
5	DF	Willi Schulz	4 October 1938 (aged 27)	31	(West Germany) Hamburger SV
6	DF	Wolfgang Weber	26 June 1944 (aged 22)	12	(West Germany) 1. FC Köln
7	MF	Albert Brülls	26 March 1937 (aged 29)	23	(Italy) Brescia
8	FW	Helmut Haller	21 July 1939 (aged 26)	22	(Italy) Bologna
9	FW	Uwe Seeler (captain)	5 November 1936 (aged 29)	48	(West Germany) Hamburger SV
10	FW	Sigfried Held	7 August 1942 (aged 23)	4	(West Germany) Borussia Dortmund
11	FW	Lothar Emmerich	29 November 1941 (aged 24)	1	(West Germany) Borussia Dortmund
12	MF	Wolfgang Overath	29 September 1943 (aged 22)	16	(West Germany) 1. FC Köln
13	FW	Heinz Hornig	28 September 1937 (aged 28)	7	(West Germany) 1. FC Köln
14	DF	Friedel Lutz	21 January 1939 (aged 27)	11	(West Germany) Eintracht Frankfurt
15	DF	Bernd Patzke	14 March 1943 (aged 23)	2	(West Germany) 1860 Munich
16	MF	Max Lorenz	19 August 1939 (aged 26)	7	(West Germany) Werder Bremen
17	DF	Wolfgang Paul	25 January 1940 (aged 26)	0	(West Germany) Borussia Dortmund
18	DF	Klaus-Dieter Sieloff	27 February 1942 (aged 24)	8	(West Germany) VfB Stuttgart
19	FW	Werner Krämer	23 January 1940 (aged 26)	11	(West Germany) Meidericher SV
20	FW	Jürgen Grabowski	7 July 1944 (aged 22)	3	(West Germany) Eintracht Frankfurt
21	GK	Günter Bernard	4 November 1939 (aged 26)	4	(West Germany) Werder Bremen
22	GK	Sepp Maier	28 February 1944 (aged 22)	1	(West Germany) Bayern Munich

== Group 3 ==
=== Brazil ===
Head coach: Vicente Feola

No.	Pos.	Player	Date of birth (age)	Caps	Club
1	GK	Gilmar	22 August 1930 (aged 35)	90	(Brazil) Santos
2	DF	Djalma Santos	27 February 1929 (aged 37)	95	(Brazil) Palmeiras
3	DF	Fidélis	13 March 1944 (aged 22)	6	(Brazil) Bangu
4	DF	Hilderaldo Bellini (captain)	7 June 1930 (aged 36)	49	(Brazil) São Paulo
5	DF	Brito	9 August 1939 (aged 26)	8	(Brazil) Vasco da Gama
6	DF	Altair	21 January 1938 (aged 28)	16	(Brazil) Fluminense
7	DF	Orlando	20 September 1935 (aged 30)	29	(Brazil) Santos
8	DF	Paulo Henrique	5 January 1943 (aged 23)	7	(Brazil) Flamengo
9	DF	Rildo	23 January 1942 (aged 24)	19	(Brazil) Botafogo
10	FW	Pelé	23 October 1940 (aged 25)	57	(Brazil) Santos
11	MF	Gérson	11 January 1941 (aged 25)	21	(Brazil) Botafogo
12	GK	Manga	26 April 1937 (aged 29)	11	(Brazil) Botafogo
13	MF	Denílson	28 March 1943 (aged 23)	4	(Brazil) Fluminense
14	MF	Lima	18 January 1942 (aged 24)	12	(Brazil) Santos
15	MF	Zito	18 August 1932 (aged 33)	46	(Brazil) Santos
16	FW	Garrincha	28 October 1933 (aged 32)	48	(Brazil) Corinthians
17	MF	Jairzinho	25 December 1944 (aged 21)	14	(Brazil) Botafogo
18	FW	Alcindo	16 December 1945 (aged 20)	4	(Brazil) Grêmio
19	FW	Silva Batuta	2 January 1940 (aged 26)	5	(Brazil) Flamengo
20	MF	Tostão	25 January 1947 (aged 19)	6	(Brazil) Cruzeiro
21	FW	Paraná	21 March 1942 (aged 24)	8	(Brazil) São Paulo
22	FW	Edu	6 August 1949 (aged 16)	5	(Brazil) Santos

=== Bulgaria ===
Head coach: (Czechoslovakia) Rudolf Vytlačil

No.	Pos.	Player	Date of birth (age)	Caps	Club
1	GK	Georgi Naydenov	21 December 1931 (aged 34)	49	(Bulgaria) CSKA Sofia
2	DF	Aleksandar Shalamanov	4 September 1941 (aged 24)	13	(Bulgaria) Slavia Sofia
3	DF	Ivan Vutsov	14 December 1939 (aged 26)	21	(Bulgaria) Levski Sofia
4	DF	Boris Gaganelov (captain)	7 October 1941 (aged 24)	23	(Bulgaria) CSKA Sofia
5	DF	Dimitar Penev	12 July 1945 (aged 20)	17	(Bulgaria) CSKA Sofia
6	DF	Dobromir Zhechev	12 November 1942 (aged 23)	13	(Bulgaria) Spartak Sofia
7	MF	Dinko Dermendzhiev	2 June 1941 (aged 25)	6	(Bulgaria) Botev Plovdiv
8	MF	Stoyan Kitov	27 August 1938 (aged 27)	20	(Bulgaria) Spartak Sofia
9	FW	Georgi Asparuhov	4 May 1943 (aged 23)	25	(Bulgaria) Levski Sofia
10	FW	Petar Zhekov	10 October 1944 (aged 21)	5	(Bulgaria) Beroe Stara Zagora
11	FW	Ivan Kolev	1 November 1930 (aged 35)	73	(Bulgaria) CSKA Sofia
12	MF	Vasil Metodiev	6 January 1935 (aged 31)	17	(Bulgaria) Lokomotiv Sofia
13	FW	Dimitar Yakimov	12 August 1941 (aged 24)	35	(Bulgaria) CSKA Sofia
14	FW	Nikola Kotkov	9 December 1938 (aged 27)	20	(Bulgaria) Lokomotiv Sofia
15	DF	Dimitar Largov	10 September 1936 (aged 29)	19	(Bulgaria) Slavia Sofia
16	FW	Aleksandar Kostov	5 March 1938 (aged 28)	7	(Bulgaria) Levski Sofia
17	FW	Stefan Abadzhiev	3 July 1934 (aged 32)	27	(Bulgaria) Levski Sofia
18	MF	Evgeni Yanchovski	5 September 1939 (aged 26)	9	(Bulgaria) Beroe Stara Zagora
19	DF	Vidin Apostolov	17 October 1941 (aged 24)	14	(Bulgaria) Botev Plovdiv
20	MF	Ivan Davidov	5 October 1943 (aged 22)	1	(Bulgaria) Slavia Sofia
21	GK	Simeon Simeonov	26 April 1946 (aged 20)	4	(Bulgaria) Slavia Sofia
22	GK	Ivan Deyanov	16 December 1937 (aged 28)	9	(Bulgaria) Lokomotiv Sofia

=== Hungary ===
Head coach: Lajos Baróti

No.	Pos.	Player	Date of birth (age)	Caps	Club
1	GK	Antal Szentmihályi	13 June 1939 (aged 27)	20	(Hungary) Újpest
2	DF	Benő Káposzta	7 June 1942 (aged 24)	3	(Hungary) Újpest
3	DF	Sándor Mátrai	20 November 1932 (aged 33)	71	(Hungary) Ferencváros
4	DF	Kálmán Sóvári	21 December 1940 (aged 25)	16	(Hungary) Újpest
5	DF	Kálmán Mészöly	16 July 1941 (aged 24)	37	(Hungary) Vasas
6	MF	Ferenc Sipos (captain)	13 December 1932 (aged 33)	71	(Hungary) Budapest Honvéd
7	FW	Ferenc Bene	17 December 1944 (aged 21)	17	(Hungary) Újpest
8	MF	Zoltán Varga	1 January 1945 (aged 21)	3	(Hungary) Ferencváros
9	FW	Flórián Albert	15 September 1941 (aged 24)	51	(Hungary) Ferencváros
10	FW	János Farkas	27 March 1942 (aged 24)	13	(Hungary) Vasas
11	MF	Gyula Rákosi	9 October 1938 (aged 27)	27	(Hungary) Ferencváros
12	FW	Máté Fenyvesi	20 September 1933 (aged 32)	76	(Hungary) Ferencváros
13	MF	Imre Mathesz	25 March 1937 (aged 29)	5	(Hungary) Vasas
14	MF	István Nagy	14 April 1939 (aged 27)	19	(Hungary) MTK Budapest
15	FW	Dezső Molnár	2 December 1939 (aged 26)	1	(Hungary) Vasas
16	FW	Lajos Tichy	21 March 1935 (aged 31)	71	(Hungary) Budapest Honvéd
17	DF	Gusztáv Szepesi	17 July 1939 (aged 26)	2	(Hungary) Tatabánya
18	DF	Kálmán Ihász	6 March 1941 (aged 25)	9	(Hungary) Vasas
19	FW	Lajos Puskás	3 August 1944 (aged 21)	2	(Hungary) Vasas
20	FW	Antal Nagy	16 May 1944 (aged 22)	3	(Hungary) Budapest Honvéd
21	GK	József Gelei	29 June 1938 (aged 28)	7	(Hungary) Tatabánya
22	GK	István Géczi	13 June 1944 (aged 22)	2	(Hungary) Ferencváros

=== Portugal ===
Head coach: (Brazil) Otto Glória

No.	Pos.	Player	Date of birth (age)	Caps	Club
1	GK	Américo	6 March 1933 (aged 33)	6	(Portugal) Porto
2	GK	Joaquim Carvalho	18 April 1937 (aged 29)	5	(Portugal) Sporting CP
3	GK	José Pereira	15 September 1931 (aged 34)	5	(Portugal) Belenenses
4	DF	Vicente	24 September 1935 (aged 30)	16	(Portugal) Belenenses
5	DF	Germano	18 January 1933 (aged 33)	23	(Portugal) Benfica
6	MF	Fernando Peres	8 January 1942 (aged 24)	3	(Portugal) Sporting CP
7	FW	Ernesto Figueiredo	6 July 1937 (aged 29)	2	(Portugal) Sporting CP
8	FW	João Lourenço	8 April 1942 (aged 24)	0	(Portugal) Sporting CP
9	MF	Hilário	19 March 1939 (aged 27)	18	(Portugal) Sporting CP
10	MF	Mário Coluna (captain)	6 August 1935 (aged 30)	45	(Portugal) Benfica
11	MF	António Simões	14 December 1943 (aged 22)	20	(Portugal) Benfica
12	MF	José Augusto	13 April 1937 (aged 29)	29	(Portugal) Benfica
13	FW	Eusébio	25 January 1942 (aged 24)	26	(Portugal) Benfica
14	MF	Fernando Cruz	12 August 1940 (aged 25)	10	(Portugal) Benfica
15	FW	Manuel Duarte	20 May 1943 (aged 23)	2	(Portugal) Leixões
16	MF	Jaime Graça	10 January 1942 (aged 24)	6	(Portugal) Vitória de Setúbal
17	DF	João Morais	6 March 1935 (aged 31)	2	(Portugal) Sporting CP
18	FW	José Torres	8 September 1938 (aged 27)	18	(Portugal) Benfica
19	MF	Custódio Pinto	9 February 1942 (aged 24)	10	(Portugal) Porto
20	DF	Alexandre Baptista	17 February 1941 (aged 25)	4	(Portugal) Sporting CP
21	DF	José Carlos	22 September 1941 (aged 24)	19	(Portugal) Sporting CP
22	DF	Alberto Festa	21 July 1939 (aged 26)	16	(Portugal) Porto

== Group 4 ==
=== Chile ===
Head coach: Luis Álamos

No.	Pos.	Player	Date of birth (age)	Caps	Club
1	FW	Pedro Araya	23 January 1942 (aged 24)	20	Universidad de Chile
2	DF	Hugo Berly	31 December 1941 (aged 24)	0	(Chile) Audax Italiano
3	MF	Carlos Campos	14 February 1937 (aged 29)	10	Universidad de Chile
4	MF	Humberto Cruz	8 December 1939 (aged 26)	16	(Chile) Colo-Colo
5	DF	Humberto Donoso	9 October 1938 (aged 27)	14	Universidad de Chile
6	DF	Luis Eyzaguirre	22 June 1939 (aged 27)	38	Universidad de Chile
7	DF	Elías Figueroa	25 October 1946 (aged 19)	7	(Chile) Santiago Wanderers
8	FW	Alberto Fouilloux	22 November 1940 (aged 25)	36	(Chile) Universidad Católica
9	GK	Adán Godoy	26 November 1936 (aged 29)	14	(Chile) Universidad Católica
10	MF	Roberto Hodge	30 July 1944 (aged 21)	9	Universidad de Chile
11	FW	Honorino Landa	1 June 1942 (aged 24)	23	(Chile) Green Cross Temuco
12	MF	Rubén Marcos	6 December 1942 (aged 23)	17	Universidad de Chile
13	GK	Juan Olivares	20 February 1941 (aged 25)	4	(Chile) Santiago Wanderers
14	MF	Ignacio Prieto	23 September 1943 (aged 22)	15	(Chile) Universidad Católica
15	MF	Jaime Ramírez	14 August 1931 (aged 34)	46	Universidad de Chile
16	FW	Orlando Ramírez	7 May 1943 (aged 23)	11	Universidad de Chile
17	MF	Leonel Sánchez (captain)	25 April 1936 (aged 30)	77	Universidad de Chile
18	MF	Armando Tobar	7 June 1938 (aged 28)	29	(Chile) Universidad Católica
19	FW	Francisco Valdés	19 March 1943 (aged 23)	11	(Chile) Colo-Colo
20	DF	Alberto Valentini	25 November 1938 (aged 27)	17	(Chile) Colo-Colo
21	DF	Hugo Villanueva	9 April 1939 (aged 27)	15	Universidad de Chile
22	FW	Guillermo Yávar	26 March 1943 (aged 23)	11	Universidad de Chile

=== Italy ===
Head coach: Edmondo Fabbri

No.	Pos.	Player	Date of birth (age)	Caps	Club
1	GK	Enrico Albertosi	2 November 1939 (aged 26)	10	(Italy) Fiorentina
2	GK	Roberto Anzolin	18 April 1938 (aged 28)	1	(Italy) Juventus
3	MF	Paolo Barison	23 June 1936 (aged 30)	7	(Italy) Roma
4	MF	Giacomo Bulgarelli	24 October 1940 (aged 25)	24	(Italy) Bologna
5	DF	Tarcisio Burgnich	25 April 1939 (aged 27)	12	(Italy) Internazionale
6	DF	Giacinto Facchetti	18 July 1942 (aged 23)	21	(Italy) Internazionale
7	MF	Romano Fogli	21 January 1938 (aged 28)	11	(Italy) Bologna
8	DF	Aristide Guarneri	7 March 1938 (aged 28)	12	(Italy) Internazionale
9	DF	Francesco Janich	27 March 1937 (aged 29)	5	(Italy) Bologna
10	FW	Antonio Juliano	26 December 1942 (aged 23)	1	(Italy) Napoli
11	DF	Spartaco Landini	31 January 1944 (aged 22)	1	(Italy) Internazionale
12	MF	Gianfranco Leoncini	25 September 1939 (aged 26)	1	(Italy) Juventus
13	MF	Giovanni Lodetti	10 August 1942 (aged 23)	12	(Italy) Milan
14	FW	Sandro Mazzola	8 November 1942 (aged 23)	19	(Italy) Internazionale
15	FW	Luigi Meroni	24 February 1943 (aged 23)	5	(Italy) Torino
16	FW	Ezio Pascutti	1 June 1937 (aged 29)	15	(Italy) Bologna
17	MF	Marino Perani	27 October 1939 (aged 26)	2	(Italy) Bologna
18	GK	Pierluigi Pizzaballa	14 September 1939 (aged 26)	1	(Italy) Atalanta
19	FW	Gianni Rivera	18 August 1943 (aged 22)	23	(Italy) Milan
20	FW	Francesco Rizzo	30 May 1943 (aged 23)	2	(Italy) Cagliari
21	DF	Roberto Rosato	18 August 1943 (aged 22)	12	(Italy) Torino
22	DF	Sandro Salvadore (captain)	29 November 1939 (aged 26)	27	(Italy) Juventus

=== North Korea ===
Source: FIFA

Head coach: Myung Rye-hyun

No.	Pos.	Player	Date of birth (age)	Caps	Club
1	GK	Li Chan-myung	2 January 1947 (aged 19)	0	(North Korea) Kigwancha
2	DF	Pak Li-sup	6 January 1944 (aged 22)	0	(North Korea) Amrokgang
3	DF	Shin Yung-kyoo (captain)	30 March 1942 (aged 24)	0	(North Korea) Moranbong
4	MF	Kang Bong-chil	7 November 1943 (aged 22)	0	(North Korea) 8 February
5	DF	Lim Zoong-sun	16 July 1943 (aged 22)	0	(North Korea) Moranbong
6	MF	Im Seung-hwi	3 February 1946 (aged 20)	0	(North Korea) 8 February
7	FW	Pak Doo-ik	17 March 1942 (aged 24)	0	(North Korea) Moranbong
8	FW	Pak Seung-zin	11 January 1941 (aged 25)	0	(North Korea) Moranbong
9	GK	Lee Keun-hak	7 July 1940 (aged 26)	?	(North Korea) Moranbong
10	FW	Kang Ryong-woon	25 April 1942 (aged 24)	0	(North Korea) Rodongja
11	MF	Han Bong-zin	2 September 1945 (aged 20)	0	(North Korea) 8 February
12	FW	Kim Seung-Il	2 September 1945 (aged 20)	0	(North Korea) Moranbong
13	DF	Oh Yoon-kyung	6 August 1941 (aged 24)	0	(North Korea) 8 August
14	DF	Ha Jung-won	20 April 1942 (aged 24)	0	(North Korea) 8 August
15	FW	Yang Seung-kook	19 August 1944 (aged 21)	0	(North Korea) Kigwancha
16	MF	Li Dong-woon	4 July 1945 (aged 21)	0	(North Korea) Rodongja
17	MF	Kim Bong-hwan	4 July 1939 (aged 27)	0	(North Korea) Kigwancha
18	MF	Ke Seung-woon	26 December 1943 (aged 22)	?	(North Korea) Rodongja
19	DF	Kim Yung-kil	29 January 1944 (aged 22)	?	(North Korea) Rodongja
20	DF	Ryoo Chang-kil	5 November 1940 (aged 25)	?	(North Korea) Kigwancha
21	GK	An Se-bok	29 October 1946 (aged 19)	0	(North Korea) Amrokgang
22	FW	Li Chi-an	7 July 1945 (aged 21)	?	(North Korea) 8 February

- Note: As of 2002, only seven players of North Korean team are surviving. See: The Game of Their Lives

=== Soviet Union ===
Head coach: Nikolai Morozov

No.	Pos.	Player	Date of birth (age)	Caps	Club
1	GK	Lev Yashin	22 October 1929 (aged 36)	63	(Soviet Union) Dynamo Moscow
2	FW	Viktor Serebryanikov	29 March 1940 (aged 26)	7	(Soviet Union) Dynamo Kyiv
3	DF	Leonid Ostrovskiy	17 January 1936 (aged 30)	7	(Soviet Union) Dynamo Kyiv
4	DF	Vladimir Ponomaryov	18 February 1940 (aged 26)	16	(Soviet Union) CSKA Moscow
5	MF	Valentin Afonin	22 December 1939 (aged 26)	10	(Soviet Union) SKA Rostov
6	DF	Albert Shesternyov (captain)	20 June 1941 (aged 25)	28	(Soviet Union) CSKA Moscow
7	MF	Murtaz Khurtsilava	5 January 1943 (aged 23)	5	(Soviet Union) Dinamo Tbilisi
8	MF	Yozhef Sabo	29 February 1940 (aged 26)	10	(Soviet Union) Dynamo Kyiv
9	DF	Viktor Getmanov	4 May 1940 (aged 26)	5	(Soviet Union) SKA Rostov
10	DF	Vasiliy Danilov	13 May 1941 (aged 25)	13	(Soviet Union) Zenit Leningrad
11	MF	Igor Chislenko	4 January 1939 (aged 27)	26	(Soviet Union) Dynamo Moscow
12	MF	Valery Voronin	17 July 1939 (aged 26)	46	(Soviet Union) Torpedo Moscow
13	DF	Alexey Korneyev	6 February 1939 (aged 27)	4	(Soviet Union) Spartak Moscow
14	MF	Georgi Sichinava	15 September 1944 (aged 21)	5	(Soviet Union) Dinamo Tbilisi
15	FW	Galimzyan Khusainov	27 June 1937 (aged 29)	26	(Soviet Union) Spartak Moscow
16	FW	Slava Metreveli	30 May 1936 (aged 30)	42	(Soviet Union) Dinamo Tbilisi
17	FW	Valeriy Porkujan	4 October 1944 (aged 21)	0	(Soviet Union) Dynamo Kyiv
18	FW	Anatoliy Banishevskiy	23 February 1946 (aged 20)	13	(Soviet Union) Neftyanik Baku
19	FW	Eduard Malofeyev	2 June 1942 (aged 24)	15	(Soviet Union) Dinamo Minsk
20	FW	Eduard Markarov	20 June 1942 (aged 24)	1	(Soviet Union) Neftyanik Baku
21	GK	Anzor Kavazashvili	19 July 1940 (aged 25)	9	(Soviet Union) Torpedo Moscow
22	GK	Viktor Bannikov	28 April 1938 (aged 28)	7	(Soviet Union) Dynamo Kyiv

== Notes ==
Each national team had to submit a squad of 22 players. All the teams included 3 goalkeepers, except Brazil, Chile and North Korea who only called two.

== Coaches representation by country ==
Nº	Country	Coaches
2	Brazil	Vicente Feola, Otto Glória (Portugal)
2	Italy	Edmondo Fabbri, Alfredo Foni (Switzerland)
1	Argentina	Juan Carlos Lorenzo
1	Chile	Luis Álamos
1	Czechoslovakia	Rudolf Vytlačil (Bulgaria)
1	England	Alf Ramsey
1	France	Henri Guérin
1	Hungary	Lajos Baróti
1	Mexico	Ignacio Tréllez
1	North Korea	Myung Rye-hyun
1	Soviet Union	Nikolai Morozov
1	Spain	José Villalonga
1	Uruguay	Ondino Viera
1	West Germany	Helmut Schön
