= 1966 FIFA World Cup Group 1 =

Group 1 of the 1966 FIFA World Cup consisted of Uruguay, hosts England, France, and Mexico. Play began on 11 July 1966 and concluded on 20 July 1966. England won the group and Uruguay finished as runners-up, and both advanced to the quarter-finals. Mexico and France failed to advance. England went on to win the tournament.

== Standings ==
Pos	Team	Pld	W	D	L	GF	GA	GR	Pts	Qualification
1	England	3	2	1	0	4	0	—	5	Advance to knockout stage
2	Uruguay	3	1	2	0	2	1	2.000	4	Advance to knockout stage
3	Mexico	3	0	2	1	1	3	0.333	2	
4	France	3	0	1	2	2	5	0.400	1	

Source: FIFA

== Matches ==
=== England vs Uruguay ===
11 July 1966
19:30 BST

England	0–0	Uruguay

Wembley Stadium, London
Attendance: 87,148
Referee: Istvan Zsolt (Hungary)

England	Uruguay

GK	1	Gordon Banks
RB	2	George Cohen
CB	5	Jack Charlton
CB	6	Bobby Moore (c)
LB	3	Ray Wilson
CM	4	Nobby Stiles
CM	7	Alan Ball
CM	9	Bobby Charlton
RF	8	Jimmy Greaves
CF	21	Roger Hunt
LF	11	John Connelly
Manager:
Alf Ramsey

GK	1	Ladislao Mazurkiewicz
SW	2	Horacio Troche (c)
RB	15	Luis Ubiña
CB	3	Jorge Manicera
CH	5	Néstor Gonçalves
LB	6	Omar Caetano
RH	18	Milton Viera
LH	7	Julio César Cortés
CM	10	Pedro Rocha
CF	19	Héctor Silva
CF	11	Domingo Pérez
Manager:
Ondino Viera

=== France vs Mexico ===
13 July 1966
19:30 BST

France	1–1	Mexico
Hausser 62'		Borja 48'

Wembley Stadium, London
Attendance: 69,237
Referee: Menachem Ashkenazi (Israel)

France	Mexico

GK	1	Marcel Aubour
DF	5	Bernard Bosquier
DF	6	Robert Budzynski
DF	11	Gabriel De Michèle
DF	12	Jean Djorkaeff
MF	2	Marcel Artelesa (c)
MF	4	Joseph Bonnel
MF	16	Robert Herbin
FW	8	Néstor Combin
FW	13	Philippe Gondet
FW	14	Gérard Hausser
Manager:
Henri Guérin

GK	12	Ignacio Calderón
DF	2	Arturo Chaires
DF	3	Gustavo Peña (c)
DF	14	Gabriel Núñez
MF	6	Isidoro Díaz
MF	15	Guillermo Hernández
MF	17	Magdaleno Mercado
FW	8	Aarón Padilla
FW	10	Javier Fragoso
FW	19	Salvador Reyes
FW	20	Enrique Borja
Manager:
Ignacio Trelles

=== Uruguay vs France ===
15 July 1966
19:30 BST

Uruguay	2–1	France
Rocha 26'; Cortés 31'		De Bourgoing 15' (pen.)

White City Stadium, London
Attendance: 45,662
Referee: Karol Galba (Czechoslovakia)

Uruguay	France

GK	1	Ladislao Mazurkiewicz
DF	2	Horacio Troche (c)
DF	3	Jorge Manicera
DF	5	Néstor Gonçalves
DF	15	Luis Ubiña
MF	6	Omar Caetano
MF	7	Julio César Cortés
FW	9	José Sasía
FW	10	Pedro Rocha
FW	11	Domingo Pérez
FW	18	Milton Viera
Manager:
Ondino Viera

GK	1	Marcel Aubour
DF	5	Bernard Bosquier
DF	6	Robert Budzynski
DF	12	Jean Djorkaeff
DF	2	Marcel Artelesa (c)
MF	4	Joseph Bonnel
MF	20	Jacques Simon
MF	15	Yves Herbet
FW	10	Héctor De Bourgoing
FW	13	Philippe Gondet
FW	14	Gérard Hausser
Manager:
Henri Guérin

=== England vs Mexico ===
16 July 1966
19:30 BST

England	2–0	Mexico
B. Charlton 37'; Hunt 75'

Wembley Stadium, London
Attendance: 92,570
Referee: Concetto Lo Bello (Italy)

England	Mexico

GK	1	Gordon Banks
RB	2	George Cohen
CB	5	Jack Charlton
CB	6	Bobby Moore (c)
LB	3	Ray Wilson
CM	4	Nobby Stiles
CM	9	Bobby Charlton
CM	16	Martin Peters
RW	19	Terry Paine
CF	8	Jimmy Greaves
CF	21	Roger Hunt
Manager:
Alf Ramsey

GK	12	Ignacio Calderón
RB	2	Arturo Chaires
CB	3	Gustavo Peña (c)
CB	14	Gabriel Núñez
LB	15	Guillermo Hernández
CH	4	Jesús del Muro
CH	6	Isidoro Díaz
RF	19	Salvador Reyes
CF	20	Enrique Borja
CF	5	Ignacio Jáuregui
LF	8	Aarón Padilla
Manager:
Ignacio Trelles

=== Mexico vs Uruguay ===
19 July 1966
16:30 BST

Mexico	0–0	Uruguay

Wembley Stadium, London
Attendance: 61,112
Referee: Bertil Lööw (Sweden)

Mexico	Uruguay

GK	1	Antonio Carbajal
RB	2	Arturo Chaires
CB	3	Gustavo Peña (c)
CB	14	Gabriel Núñez
LB	15	Guillermo Hernández
CH	6	Isidoro Díaz
CH	17	Magdaleno Mercado
RF	9	Ernesto Cisneros
CF	19	Salvador Reyes
CF	20	Enrique Borja
LF	8	Aarón Padilla
Manager:
Ignacio Trelles

GK	1	Ladislao Mazurkiewicz
SW	2	Horacio Troche (c)
RB	15	Luis Ubiña
CB	5	Néstor Gonçalves
CB	3	Jorge Manicera
LB	6	Omar Caetano
CH	18	Milton Viera
CH	10	Pedro Rocha
RF	7	Julio César Cortés
CF	9	José Sasía
LF	11	Domingo Pérez
Manager:
Ondino Viera

=== England vs France ===
20 July 1966
19:30 BST

England	2–0	France
Hunt 38', 75'

Wembley Stadium, London
Attendance: 98,270
Referee: Arturo Yamasaki (Peru)

England	France

GK	1	Gordon Banks
RB	2	George Cohen
CB	5	Jack Charlton
CB	6	Bobby Moore (c)
LB	3	Ray Wilson
CM	4	Nobby Stiles	(yellow card) 44'
CM	9	Bobby Charlton
CM	16	Martin Peters
RW	20	Ian Callaghan
CF	8	Jimmy Greaves
CF	21	Roger Hunt
Manager:
Alf Ramsey

GK	1	Marcel Aubour
RB	12	Jean Djorkaeff
CB	2	Marcel Artelesa (c)
CB	6	Robert Budzynski
LB	5	Bernard Bosquier
RH	4	Joseph Bonnel
CH	16	Robert Herbin
LH	20	Jacques Simon
RF	15	Yves Herbet
CF	13	Philippe Gondet
LF	14	Gérard Hausser
Manager:
Henri Guérin

== See also ==
- England at the FIFA World Cup
- France at the FIFA World Cup
- Mexico at the FIFA World Cup
- Uruguay at the FIFA World Cup
