= 1966 FIFA World Cup Group 2 =

Football tournament group stage

Group 2 of the 1966 FIFA World Cup consisted of Argentina, West Germany, Spain, and Switzerland. Play began on 12 July 1966 and concluded on 20 July 1966. West Germany won the group and Argentina finished as runners-up, and both advanced to the quarter-finals. Spain and Switzerland failed to advance.

== Standings ==
Pos	Team	Pld	W	D	L	GF	GA	GR	Pts	Qualification
1	West Germany	3	2	1	0	7	1	7.000	5 (Note: West Germany finished ahead of Argentina on goal average.)	Advance to knockout stage
2	Argentina	3	2	1	0	4	1	4.000	5	Advance to knockout stage
3	Spain	3	1	0	2	4	5	0.800	2	
4	Switzerland	3	0	0	3	1	9	0.111	0	

Source: FIFA

== Matches ==
=== West Germany vs Switzerland ===
12 July 1966
19:30 BST

West Germany	5–0	Switzerland
Held 16'; Haller 21', 77' (pen.); Beckenbauer 40', 52'

Hillsborough Stadium, Sheffield
Attendance: 36,127
Referee: Hugh Phillips (Scotland)

West Germany	Switzerland

GK	1	Hans Tilkowski
RB	2	Horst-Dieter Höttges
CB	5	Willi Schulz
CB	6	Wolfgang Weber
LB	3	Karl-Heinz Schnellinger
SW	4	Franz Beckenbauer
CM	12	Wolfgang Overath
CM	8	Helmut Haller
RW	7	Albert Brülls
CF	9	Uwe Seeler (c)
LW	10	Sigfried Held
Manager:
Helmut Schön

GK	1	Karl Elsener
RB	9	André Grobéty
CB	18	Heinz Schneiter (c)
CB	20	Ely Tacchella
LB	7	Hansruedi Führer
RH	4	Heinz Bäni
LH	6	Richard Dürr
OR	15	Karl Odermatt
CF	13	Fritz Künzli
CF	10	Robert Hosp
OL	17	Jean-Claude Schindelholz
Manager:
(Italy) Alfredo Foni

=== Argentina vs Spain ===
13 July 1966
19:30 BST

Argentina	2–1	Spain
Artime 66', 79'		Pirri 72'

Villa Park, Birmingham
Attendance: 42,738
Referee: Dimitar Rumenchev (Bulgaria)

Argentina
Spain

GK	1	Antonio Roma
RB	8	Roberto Ferreiro
CB	4	Roberto Perfumo
CB	12	Rafael Albrecht
LB	7	Silvio Marzolini
CM	15	Jorge Solari
CM	10	Antonio Rattín (c)
CM	16	Alberto González
AM	20	Ermindo Onega
CF	19	Luis Artime
LW	21	Oscar Más
Manager:
Juan Carlos Lorenzo

GK	1	José Iríbar
RB	2	Manuel Sanchís
CB	17	Gallego
CB	5	Ignacio Zoco
LB	3	Eladio Silvestre
CM	10	Luis Suárez
CM	18	Pirri
CM	4	Luis Del Sol
RW	7	José Ufarte
CF	20	Joaquín Peiró
LW	11	Francisco Gento (c)
Manager:
José Villalonga

=== Spain vs Switzerland ===
15 July 1966
19:30 BST

Spain	2–1	Switzerland
Sanchís 57'; Amancio 75'		Quentin 31'

Hillsborough Stadium, Sheffield
Attendance: 32,028
Referee: Tofiq Bahramov (Soviet Union)

Spain
Switzerland

GK	1	José Iríbar
RB	4	Luis Del Sol
CB	5	Ignacio Zoco
CB	2	Manuel Sanchís
LB	15	Severino Reija
MF	17	Gallego
MF	18	Pirri
MF	20	Joaquín Peiró
MF	10	Luis Suárez
LW	11	Francisco Gento (c)
OR	8	Amancio
Manager:
José Villalonga

GK	1	Karl Elsener (c)
RB	3	Kurt Armbruster
CB	5	René Brodmann
CB	14	Werner Leimgruber
CB	19	Xavier Stierli
LB	7	Hansruedi Führer
MF	4	Heinz Bäni
MF	11	Köbi Kuhn
OR	8	Vittore Gottardi
CF	10	Robert Hosp
OL	16	René-Pierre Quentin
Manager:
(Italy) Alfredo Foni

=== Argentina vs West Germany ===
16 July 1966
15:00 BST

Argentina	0–0	West Germany

Villa Park, Birmingham
Attendance: 46,587
Referee: Konstantin Zečević (Yugoslavia)

Argentina
West Germany

GK	1	Antonio Roma
DF	8	Roberto Ferreiro
DF	4	Roberto Perfumo
DF	12	Rafael Albrecht	(red card) 65'
DF	7	Silvio Marzolini
MF	10	Antonio Rattín (c)
MF	15	Jorge Solari
MF	16	Alberto González
FW	20	Ermindo Onega
FW	19	Luis Artime
FW	21	Oscar Más
Manager:
Juan Carlos Lorenzo

GK	1	Hans Tilkowski
RB	2	Horst Höttges
LB	3	Karl-Heinz Schnellinger
CB	5	Willi Schulz
CB	6	Wolfgang Weber
SW	4	Franz Beckenbauer	(yellow card) 48'
CM	12	Wolfgang Overath
CM	8	Helmut Haller
RW	7	Albert Brülls
FW	9	Uwe Seeler (c)
LW	10	Siggi Held
Manager:
Helmut Schön

=== Argentina vs Switzerland ===
19 July 1966
19:30 BST

Argentina	2–0	Switzerland
Artime 52'; Onega 79'

Hillsborough Stadium, Sheffield
Attendance: 32,127
Referee: Joaquim Campos (Portugal)

Argentina
Switzerland

GK	1	Antonio Roma
DF	8	Roberto Ferreiro
DF	4	Roberto Perfumo
DF	6	Oscar Calics
DF	7	Silvio Marzolini
MF	10	Antonio Rattín (c)
MF	15	Jorge Solari
MF	16	Alberto González
FW	20	Ermindo Onega
FW	19	Luis Artime
FW	21	Oscar Más
Manager:
Juan Carlos Lorenzo

GK	12	Leo Eichmann
DF	5	René Brodmann (c)
DF	7	Hansruedi Führer
DF	19	Xavier Stierli
DF	3	Kurt Armbruster
MF	4	Heinz Bäni
MF	11	Köbi Kuhn
MF	8	Vittore Gottardi
MF	10	Robert Hosp
FW	13	Fritz Künzli
FW	16	René-Pierre Quentin
Manager:
(Italy) Alfredo Foni

=== West Germany vs Spain ===
20 July 1966
19:30 BST

West Germany	2–1	Spain
Emmerich 39'; Seeler 84'		Fusté 23'

Villa Park, Birmingham
Attendance: 42,187
Referee: Armando Marques (Brazil)

West Germany
Spain

GK	1	Hans Tilkowski
DF	2	Horst-Dieter Höttges
DF	3	Karl-Heinz Schnellinger
DF	5	Willi Schulz
DF	6	Wolfgang Weber
MF	4	Franz Beckenbauer
MF	12	Wolfgang Overath	(yellow card) 46'
FW	9	Uwe Seeler (c)
FW	10	Sigfried Held
FW	11	Lothar Emmerich
FW	19	Werner Krämer
Manager:
Helmut Schön

GK	1	José Ángel Iribar
DF	2	Manuel Sanchís
DF	15	Severino Reija
MF	21	Adelardo Rodríguez
MF	5	Ignacio Zoco (c)
MF	6	Jesús Glaría	(yellow card) 33'
DF	17	Gallego
FW	8	Amancio
FW	9	Marcelino Martínez
MF	19	Josep Maria Fusté
FW	22	Carlos Lapetra
Manager:
José Villalonga

== See also ==
- Argentina at the FIFA World Cup
- Germany at the FIFA World Cup
- Spain at the FIFA World Cup
- Switzerland at the FIFA World Cup
