= Li Keun-hak =

North Korean footballer

Personal information
- Date of birth: 7 July 1940
- Place of birth: North Korea
- Position: Goalkeeper

Senior career*
Years	Team	Apps	(Gls)
- Moranbong Sports Club

International career
c. 1962–after 1966	North Korea	51+	
- * Club domestic league appearances and goals

Li Keun-hak, also known as Lee Keun-hak or Li Gun-hak (born 7 July 1940-before 2002) was a North Korean football goalkeeper. He recorded over 50 appearances for the national team and was part of their squad at the 1966 FIFA World Cup. He also played for Moranbong Sports Club.

== Early life ==
Li was born on 7 July 1940 in North Korea. A goalkeeper, he played for Moranbong Sports Club in the country's top league.

== International career ==
In 1957, the North Korea national football team was re-organized with the goal of competing at the 1966 FIFA World Cup. In c. 1962, Li was chosen as one of the best 40 players from the North Korean leagues, whose membership reportedly consisted of over 250,000, to be considered for the national team. The 40 players were enlisted into the Army as military officers, under the leadership of colonel and coach Myung Rye-hyun, and went under strict training for the next four years in preparation for the cup. Li and the others trained twice a day starting at 6:00 a.m. and were under other restrictions which included being unmarried, no smoking, no drinking, and (for the last six months) being in bed by 10:00 p.m.

In early 1965, the North Korean leagues were suspended to allow the roster to focus solely on the task of making the World Cup. Li and the rest of the players gained experience by playing a number of international matches against nations including North Vietnam, Indonesia, Laos, Cambodia and China. The team competed at that year's Games of Emerging New Forces (GANEFO) and went undefeated, with a 3–1 win over China in the finals. Later in 1965, they played at the 1966 FIFA World Cup qualification and defeated Australia to become the sole qualifier from the African, Asian and Oceanic zone.

Li was ultimately chosen as one of 22 players for the World Cup team, being one of three goalkeepers chosen along with Li Chan-myung and An Se-bok. He was the most experienced goalkeeper on the team, having totaled 51 caps according to the Evening Telegraph, although the Sunday Mirror reported his cap total to be 63. At the World Cup, the North Korean team played their home games at Ayresome Park in Middlesbrough, England, as part of the Group 4 in the tournament which included the Soviet Union, Chile and Italy. Projected as having little chance of success, the team lost their first match, 3–0 against the Soviet Union, before tying Chile 1–1. The team then played against heavily favored Italy to determine the qualifier to the next round. In a massive upset, North Korea won 1–0 on a goal by Pak Doo-ik. They eventually lost 5–3 in the quarterfinals to Portugal. During the tournament, Li served as backup to Li Chan-myung, appearing in no matches.

== Later life ==
After the World Cup, it was rumored that the North Korean squad was imprisoned for celebrating the win over Italy in a bar; however, when interviewed in 2002, several players denied this. In 2002, the surviving members of the 1966 North Korean World Cup team were interviewed for the documentary film The Game of Their Lives; Li was not among them.
