= Villa Park =

Football stadium in Aston, Birmingham, England

Coordinates: 52°30′33″N 1°53′05″W

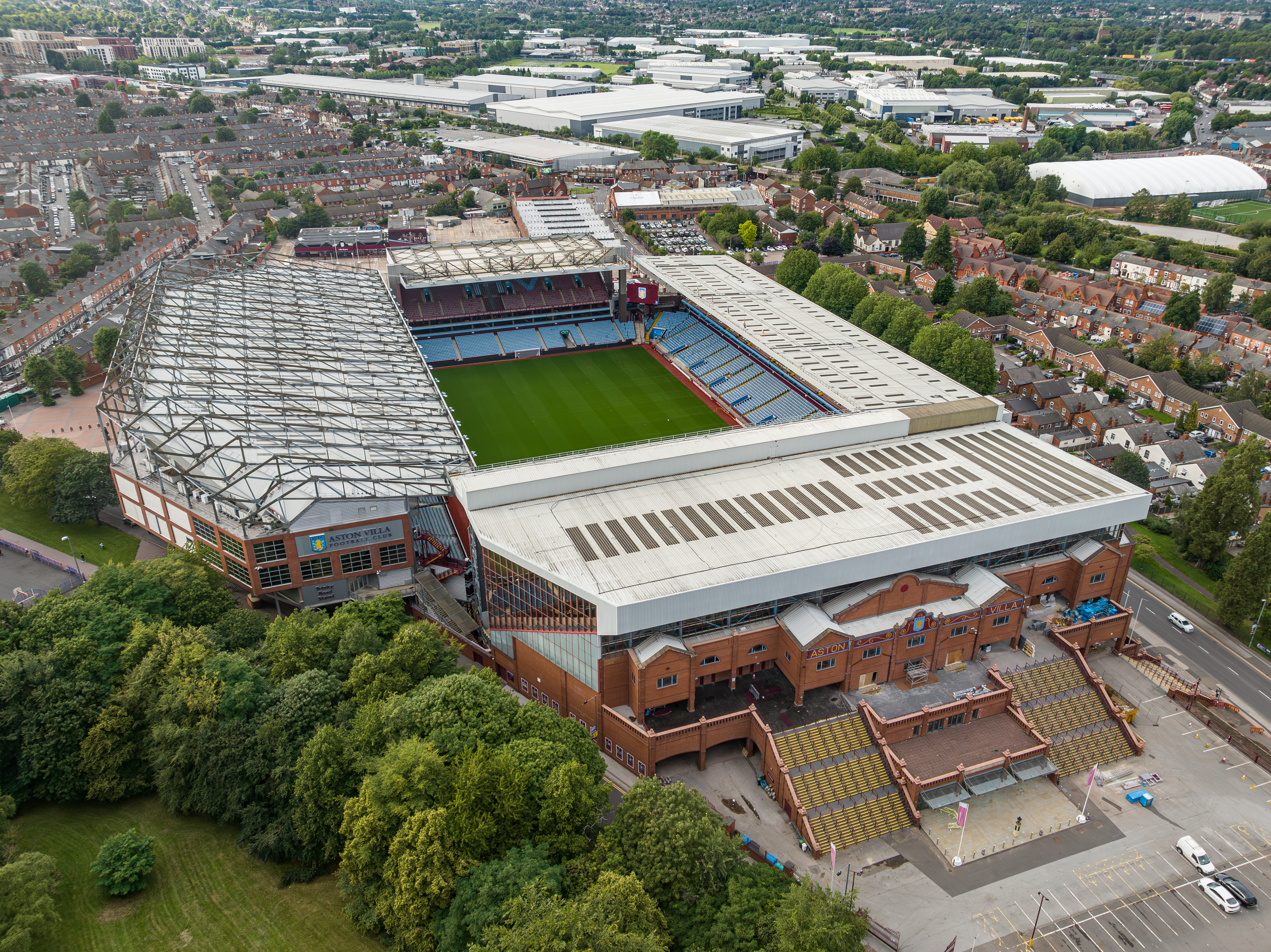
- UEFA
- Interactive map of Villa Park
- Former names: Aston Lower Grounds
- Address: Trinity Road
- Location: Aston; Birmingham, England; B6 6HE
- Owner: Aston Villa
- Operator: Aston Villa
- Capacity: 43,205 (currently reduced to 36,887)
- Surface: Desso GrassMaster
- Record attendance: 76,588 (Aston Villa vs Derby County, 2 March 1946)
- Field size: 105 by 68 metres (114.8 yd × 74.4 yd)
- Public transit: Aston; Witton; 7 and 11 bus routes

Construction
- Groundbreaking: 1894; 132 years ago
- Built: 1895–1897
- Opened: 1897; 129 years ago
- Cost: £16,733 (£25 mil)
- Architect: Archibald Leitch

Tenants
- Aston Villa (1897–present): Major sporting events hosted; 1966 FIFA World Cup; UEFA Euro 1996; 1999 European Cup Winners' Cup final; UEFA Euro 2028

Villa Park is a football stadium in Aston, Birmingham, with a seating capacity of 43,205. It has been the home of Premier League club Aston Villa since 1897. The ground is less than a mile from both Witton and Aston railway stations and has hosted seventeen England internationals at senior level, the first in 1899 and the most recent in 2025. Villa Park has hosted 55 FA Cup semi-finals, more than any other stadium, and it is the 11th largest in England.

In 1897, Aston Villa moved into the Aston Lower Grounds, a sports ground in a Victorian amusement park in the former grounds of Aston Hall, a Jacobean stately home. The stadium has gone through various stages of renovation and development, resulting in the current stand configuration of the Holte End, Trinity Road Stand, North Stand and Doug Ellis Stand.

Before 1914, a cycling track ran around the perimeter of the pitch where regular cycling meetings were hosted as well as athletic events. Aside from football-related uses, the stadium has seen various concerts staged along with other sporting events including boxing matches and international rugby league and rugby union matches. In 1999, the last final of the UEFA Cup Winners' Cup took place at Villa Park. Villa Park also hosted the 2012 FA Community Shield, as Wembley Stadium was in use for the final of the Olympic football tournament.

Aston Villa are currently in the process of redeveloping the North Stand: this will increase the capacity of Villa Park from 43,205 to over 50,000. The latest plans, announced in April 2025, will reuse the existing North Stand structure. Preliminary works are currently undergoing with a view to the North Stand being shut for the entirety of the 2026–27 season. The renovations are planned to be completed by August 2027: the beginning of the 2027/28 season, to support the clubs broader strategy for UEFA Euro 2028 tournament. There has been a lot of talk online whether the closed north stand has damaged the atmosphere at Villa Park and whether it affects player performance.

== History ==
Villa Park, formerly part of Aston Lower Grounds, was not the first home of Aston Villa F.C. Their previous venue, Wellington Road, faced increasing problems including an uneven pitch, poor spectator facilities, a lack of access and exorbitant rents. As a result, in 1894 Villa's committee, led by Frederick Rinder began negotiations with the owners of the Aston Lower Grounds, "the finest sports ground in the district." Situated in the former grounds of Aston Hall, a Jacobean stately home, the Lower Grounds had seen varied uses over the years.

Originally the kitchen garden of Aston Hall's owner Sir Thomas Holte, after whom the Holte End stand was named, the Lower Grounds later became a Victorian amusement park with an aquarium and a great hall. The current pitch stands on the site of the Dovehouse Pool, an ornamental pond that was drained in 1889. In place of the pool, the owners of the Lower Grounds built a cycle track and sports ground that opened on 10 June 1889 for a combined cycling and athletics event before a crowd of 15,000. Negotiations continued for two years before the Villa committee reached agreement with the site's owner, Flower & Sons, to rent the site for £300 per annum on a 21-year lease with an option to buy it at any point during the term.

Much of the credit for the design of Villa Park must to go to Villa Chairman Frederick Rinder, who as a trained Surveyor, is said to have laid down every 'level and line' of the ground himself before construction began. The committee immediately engaged an architect who began preparing plans for the site, which included construction of a new 440 yards (400 metres) cement cycle track to replace the existing cinder one. The main stand was to be built to the east on the Witton Lane side, with the track and pitch fully enclosed by banking. Construction of the final phase of the stadium began in late 1896 after negotiations with contractors over the price. Several months behind schedule, the almost-complete stadium opened with a friendly against Blackburn Rovers on 17 April 1897, which ended as a 3–0 win, one week after Aston Villa had completed the League and FA Cup 'Double'. The process of fixing issues with the building work continued for several months. As built, the stadium could house 40,000 spectators, most of whom stood in the open on the banking.

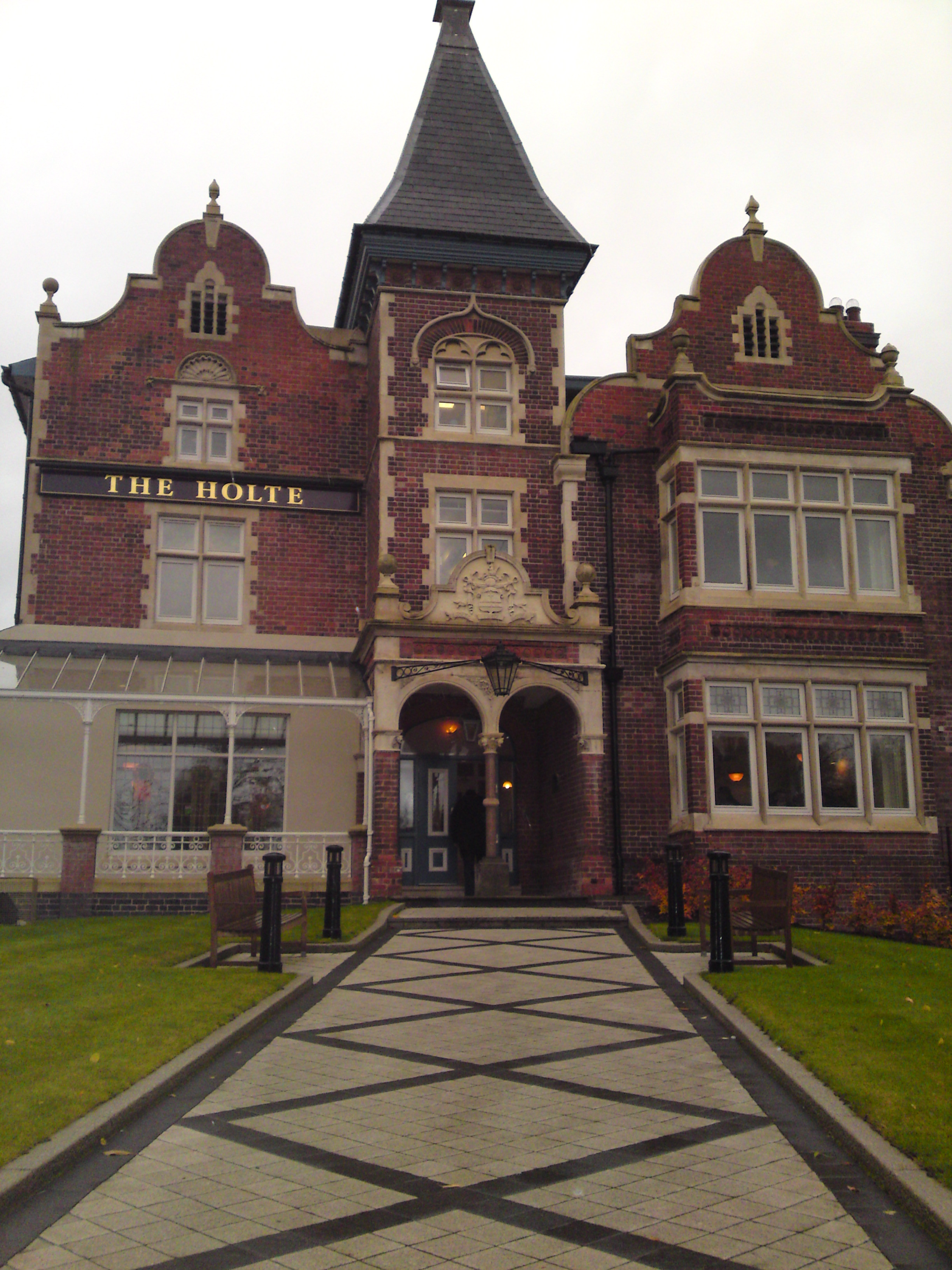
The Holte Hotel behind the Holte End, part of the original Aston Lower Grounds, refurbished in 2006

After winning the league championship in 1899, Villa's record-breaking average crowd of 21,000 allowed the club to invest in a two-stage ground improvement programme. The first stage extended the terrace covering on the Trinity Road side at the cost of £887; the second cost £1,300 and involved re-laying all terracing around the track to remedy a design flaw that caused poor sightlines for the majority of the crowd. In 1911, Villa bought the freehold of the ground for £8,250, the office buildings in the old aquarium and car park area for £1,500 and the carriage drive and bowling green for £2,000. This was the first stage in plans drawn up by Villa director Frederick Rinder that saw the capacity of Villa Park increased to 104,000.

In June 1914, another phase of enhancements began at Villa Park to compete with improvements at other grounds around the country, including Everton's Goodison Park, where a new two-tiered stand had just been completed. The first stage of improvements saw the cycling track removed, new banking at the Holte Hotel End (Holte End), and a re-profiling of all the terracing to bring it closer to the newly squared-off pitch. Rinder turned to the renowned architect Archibald Leitch to design a new Villa Park. Their joint plans included large banked end stands at the Holte and Witton ends and the incorporation of the original Victorian Lower Grounds buildings, including the aquarium and the newly acquired bowling greens. The outbreak of the First World War severely hampered design and construction efforts.

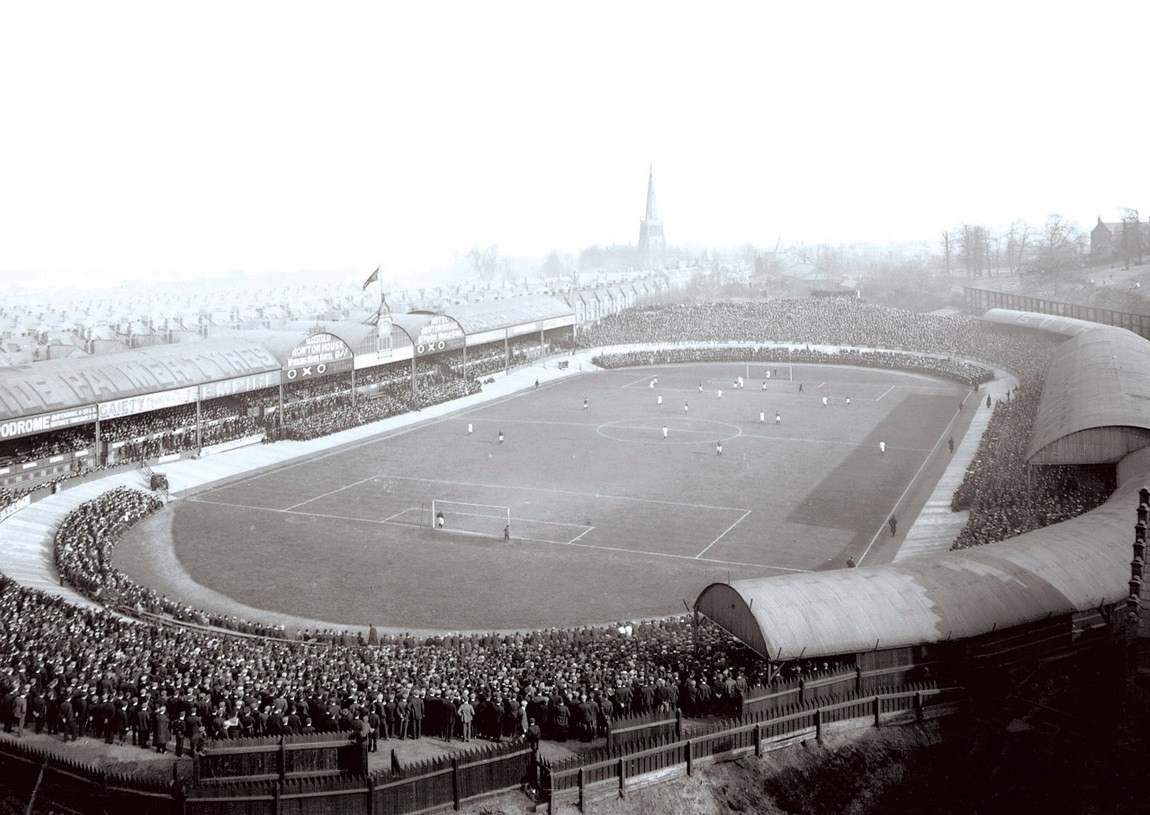
Villa Park during a match against Liverpool in 1907. The ground is yet to be squared off, and the cycle track can still be seen.

As a result of inflation, 1919 quotes for the implementation of the pre-war construction plans came to £66,000, compared to the 1914 quote of £27,000. By March 1922 this price had reduced to £41,775, and the directors pushed ahead with the plans for the new Trinity Road Stand. Construction began in April 1922 with the stand partially opened in August. Construction continued throughout the 1922–1923 season, with the stand officially opened on 26 January 1924 by the then Duke of York, later King George VI. He commented to Rinder that he had "no idea that a ground so finely equipped in every way—and devoted to football—existed."

On completion the Trinity Road Stand was considered one of the grandest in Britain, complete with stained glass windows, Italian mosaics, Dutch gables in the style of Aston Hall and a sweeping staircase. The Oak Room in the Trinity Road stand was the first restaurant at a British football ground. Several commentators including Simon Inglis consider it to be Leitch's masterpiece; a Sunday Times reporter described it in 1960 as the "St Pancras of football." The final cost of the stand and associated 1922–1924 ground developments was calculated at £89,000, a sum that enraged the club's directors who ordered an investigation into cost and in 1925 forced Rinder's resignation.

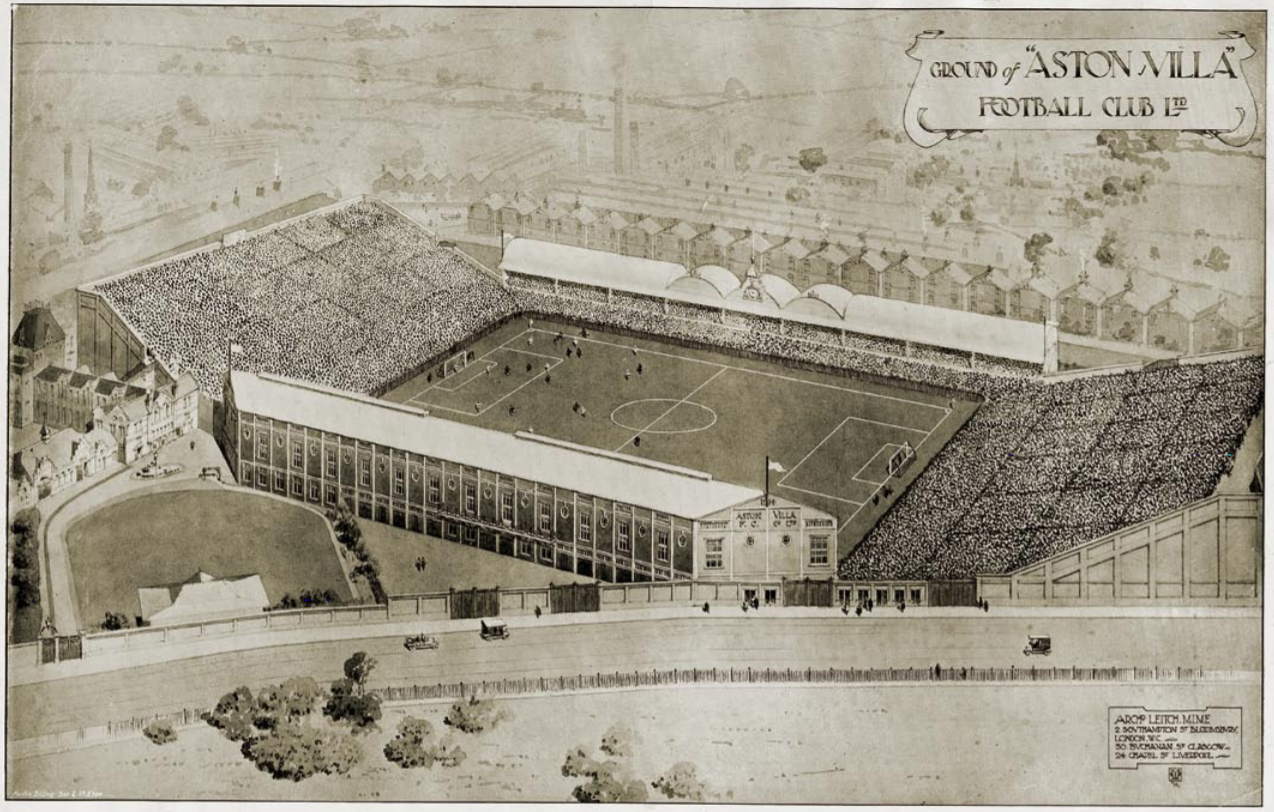
Fred Rinder's plans for Villa Park in 1914 would have extended the ground capacity to 120,000.

Villa Park remained in much the same state for another 30 years, with no major developments until the late 1950s. During the 1930s the earth and timber terraces with wooden crush barriers were completely replaced by concrete terracing and metal barriers, a process first begun by Rinder. In 1936 he was voted back onto the board at the age of 78 after the club were relegated to the Second Division. Nearly 25 years after he had created his 1914 masterplan, Rinder resurrected it and looked to carry out the third phase of his developments. He died in December 1938 (Leitch had died in April), leaving his construction business to his son, Archibald Junior.

The complete redevelopment and extension of the Holte End began in early 1939, supervised by Archibald Junior. When the Second World War broke out in September 1939, all construction across the country stopped. Unusually, given the austerity measures in place at the time, Villa acquired a special permit to continue construction of the Holte End; Simon Inglis notes "How they achieved this is not recorded". Work on the ground was completed by April 1940, and the stand was immediately mothballed as Villa Park switched to its wartime role. The Trinity Road Stand became an air-raid shelter and ammunition store while the home dressing room became the temporary home of a rifle company from the 9th Battalion, Royal Warwickshire Regiment. German bombs caused £20,000 worth of damage to the Witton Lane Stand, which was remedied by 1954.

In the late 1950s, four projects were announced. The old Bowling Green pavilion on the Trinity Road became a medical centre, the basement of the aquarium building was converted into a gym, four large floodlight pylons were installed, and a training ground was purchased 500 yards (460 metres) from Villa Park. The floodlights were first used in November 1958 for a friendly match against the Scottish side Heart of Midlothian.

In mid-1962, £40,000 was spent on a roof for the Holte End, the first to provide cover for the ordinary terrace fans at Villa Park since 1922. The old barrel-shaped roof on the Witton Lane Stand, the only remaining feature of the 1897 Villa Park, was removed in the summer of 1963 and replaced with a plain sloping roof in the same style as the Holte End. Villa Park was chosen by FIFA to host three matches for the 1966 World Cup on the condition that the Witton Lane Stand became all-seater. The players' tunnel had to be covered with a cage while the pitch was widened by 3 yards (2.7 metres).

Regular ground developments and innovations began from 1969 under the direction of the new chairman, Doug Ellis, who set about redeveloping Villa Park for the modern era. Much of the stadium had fallen into disrepair and was in need of modernisation; Villa's attendances and financial situation had also declined as a result of losing their First Division status in 1967 and going down to the Third Division for the first time in 1970. Ellis updated the infrastructure, installed a new public address system, carried out plumbing work which included installing new toilets, resurfaced the terraces, and built a new ticket office. His tenure saw executive lounges replace the old offices in the Trinity Road Stand.

Redevelopment of the Witton End stand began in the summer of 1976, a year after Villa returned to the First Division after eight years away. The stand had not seen any major work since 1924, and its rear remained a mound of earth. Initial renovations saw the levelling of the earth and new concrete terraces constructed on the lower tier in preparation for the construction of an upper tier. Stage two began in February 1977 and was officially opened in late October. The stand's design and fittings were impressive for the time, including novelties such as an 'AV' logo spelled out in coloured seats and a double row of executive boxes.

As well as the new Witton End stand, renamed the Doug Ellis Stand (after the clubs chairman, Villa Park went through further renovations throughout the ground. The cost of the work was £1.3 million. As a result, and as with the construction of the Trinity Road Stand fifty years earlier, Villa were again burdened with debt. An internal investigation found that £700,000 of the £1.3 million worth of bills were unaccounted for. A later report by accountants Deloitte Haskins & Sells found that the bills were inflated by only 10% but that there were "serious breaches of recommended codes of practice and poor site supervision".

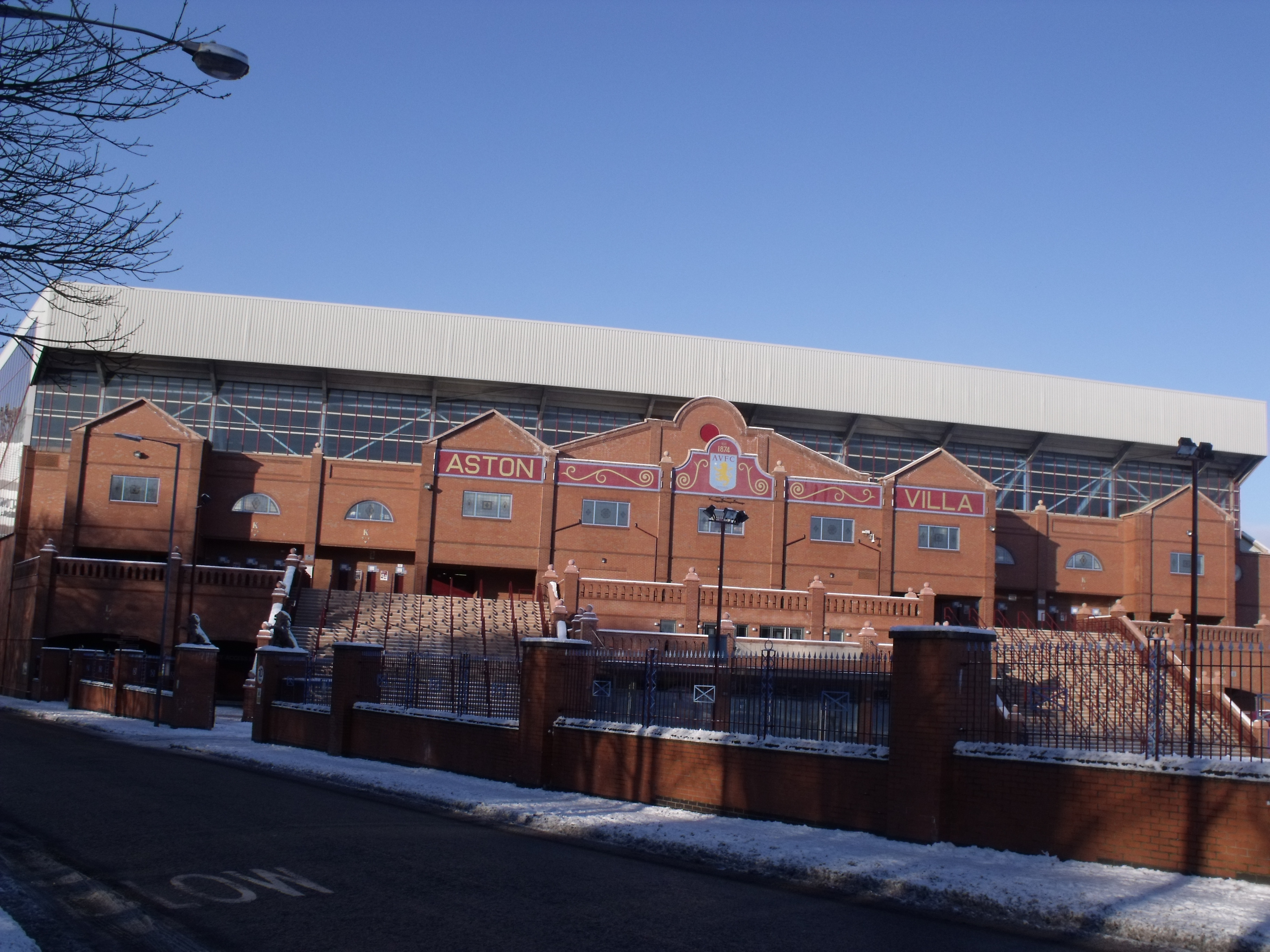
The brick facade of the Holte End, rebuilt in 1994 in the style of the adjacent Trinity Rd stand, built in 1922

In response to the Hillsborough disaster which resulted in 96 fatalities, the Taylor Report of January 1990 recommended that all major grounds be converted to become all-seater as a safety measure by August 1994. Within a few months of the Taylor Report being published, the first changes were made in line with the report. The North Stand saw the addition of 2,900 seats to the lower tier of the stand in place of terracing, the Holte End's roof was extended in preparation for more seats, the Trinity Road Stand had its roof replaced, and the Witton Lane Stand had more corporate boxes added. By that time, all four floodlight pylons had been removed to make way for boxes or in preparation for seating, and new floodlights were installed on new gantries on the Trinity and Witton stands.

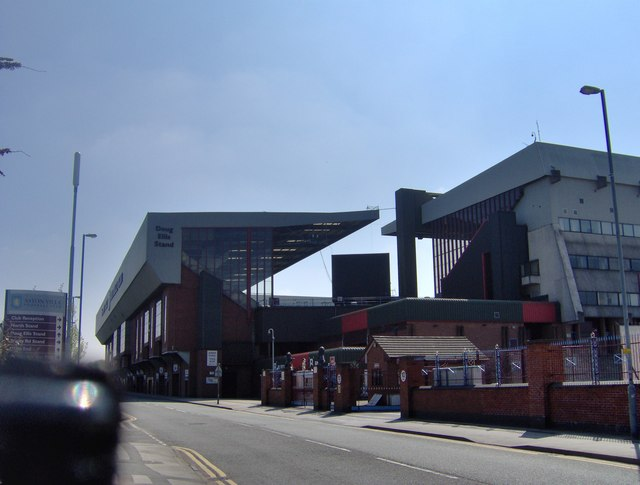
The Witton Lane Stand (Now named the Doug Ellis Stand) alongside the North Stand

In February 1992, the club's application to the council for permission to demolish the Holte Hotel was rejected. After several months of negotiations, Villa gained permission for a new stand to replace the Witton Lane Stand. The new design meant that the club had to realign Witton Lane and, as a condition of the planning permission, pay £600,000 to compulsory purchase the houses along Witton Lane and upgrade the road from a B to an A road, as well as moving its utilities. The stand was fully operational by January 1994 at the cost of £5 million with 4,686 seats, which brought Villa Park up to a capacity of 46,005. It was announced at the 70th birthday gala of chairman Doug Ellis that the stand was to be renamed the "Doug Ellis Stand", a move that caused some controversy among Villa fans with some still referring to it as the Witton Lane Stand. Nevertheless, during the 1993–94 season, the newly rebuilt Witton Lane Stand became the Doug Ellis Stand.

The Holte End was the only remaining stand that did not meet the Taylor Report requirements, and a structural survey revealed that putting seats onto the existing terracing would be uneconomical. Instead, the decision was taken to build a new stand consisting of two tiers, just four years after construction of the new roof. The demolition of the stand began on the last day of the 1993–94 season. Its replacement began to open in August 1994 with 3,000 seats in the lower tier occupied for the first seating-only game at Villa Park. By December it was fully operational and had a capacity of 13,501 seats, bringing the Villa Park capacity to 40,310. Upon completion, the Holte was the largest single end stand in Britain.

The next development at Villa Park was the Trinity Road Stand in 2000. It had stood since 1922 and seen several renovations and additions. The demolition of the old stand began after the last game of the 1999–2000 season, an event met with an element of sadness from observers such as Simon Inglis who stated that "the landscape of English football will never be the same." The new stand was larger than the old one, taking Villa's capacity from 39,399 to 42,682. It was officially opened in November 2001 by Prince Charles; his grandfather George VI had opened the old stand, 77 years earlier, when he was still the Duke of York.

In May 2025, a bronze statue of a Scottish lion rampant, by Tanya Russell was unveiled by Brian Little and Dennis Mortimer, to mark Aston Villa's 150th anniversary.

In December 2025, Aston Villa opened 'The Sports Illustrated Warehouse', a 3,500-capacity commercial and entertainment venue, located behind the North Stand.

== Structure and facilities ==
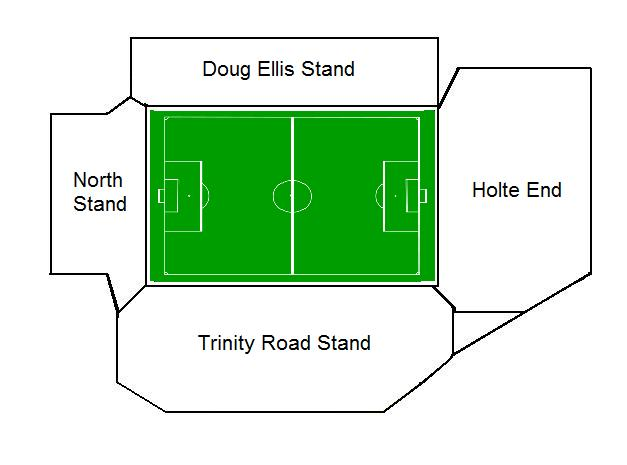
A diagram showing the alignment of stands at Villa Park

Villa Park has 43,205 seats, split between four stands. These four stands are the Holte End to the south, the Trinity Road Stand to the west, the Doug Ellis Stand opposite the Trinity Road Stand, and the North Stand behind the northern goal. All of the stands have two tiers except the Trinity Road Stand, which has three.

The Holte End is a large two-tiered stand at the south end of the stadium. Originally a large terraced banking with accommodation for more than 20,000 spectators, the current stand was constructed in 1994–1995 and consists of two tiers with no executive boxes. The two tiers are slightly curved in a parabola to provide good sightlines from all seats. Inside there are three levels of concourse and the Holte Suite, a large hospitality room for supporters. The roof is a variant of the "King Truss" system and the front third slopes slightly forward. Two large staircases, pediments, Dutch gables and a mosaic introduced in the 2007 season in the style of the old Trinity Road Stand make up the facade, itself inspired by Aston Hall. The Holte End is the most renowned stand at Villa Park amongst home and away team supporters. Traditionally, Villa's most vocal and passionate supporters gather here, including members of Aston Villa hooligan firms.

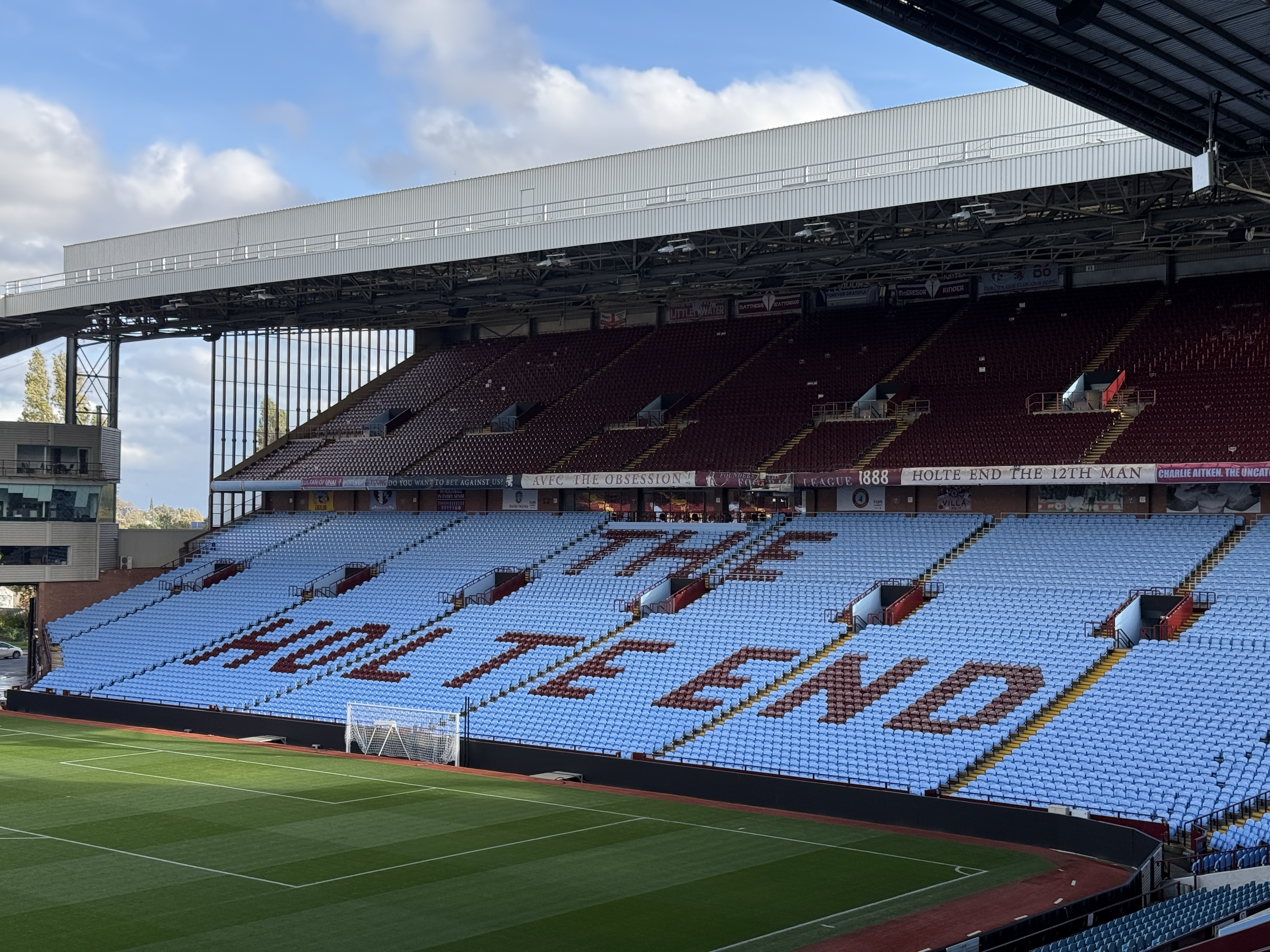
The two-tiered stand, the Holte End

Built in 2000, the main Trinity Road Stand is the most recently completed at Villa Park and houses the dressing rooms, club offices and director's boxes. The stand is composed of three tiers with a row of executive boxes between the second and third tiers. Although much larger than the other stands, the stand has roughly the same roof level as the other three sides. The players' tunnel and the technical area where the managers and substitutes sit during the match are in the middle of the stand at pitch level. The press and the directors' VIP area are situated in the centre of the middle tier. The upper tiers of the stand extend over Trinity Road, the street that cuts behind the ground. Trinity Road passes through a tunnel formed by the Trinity Road Stand.

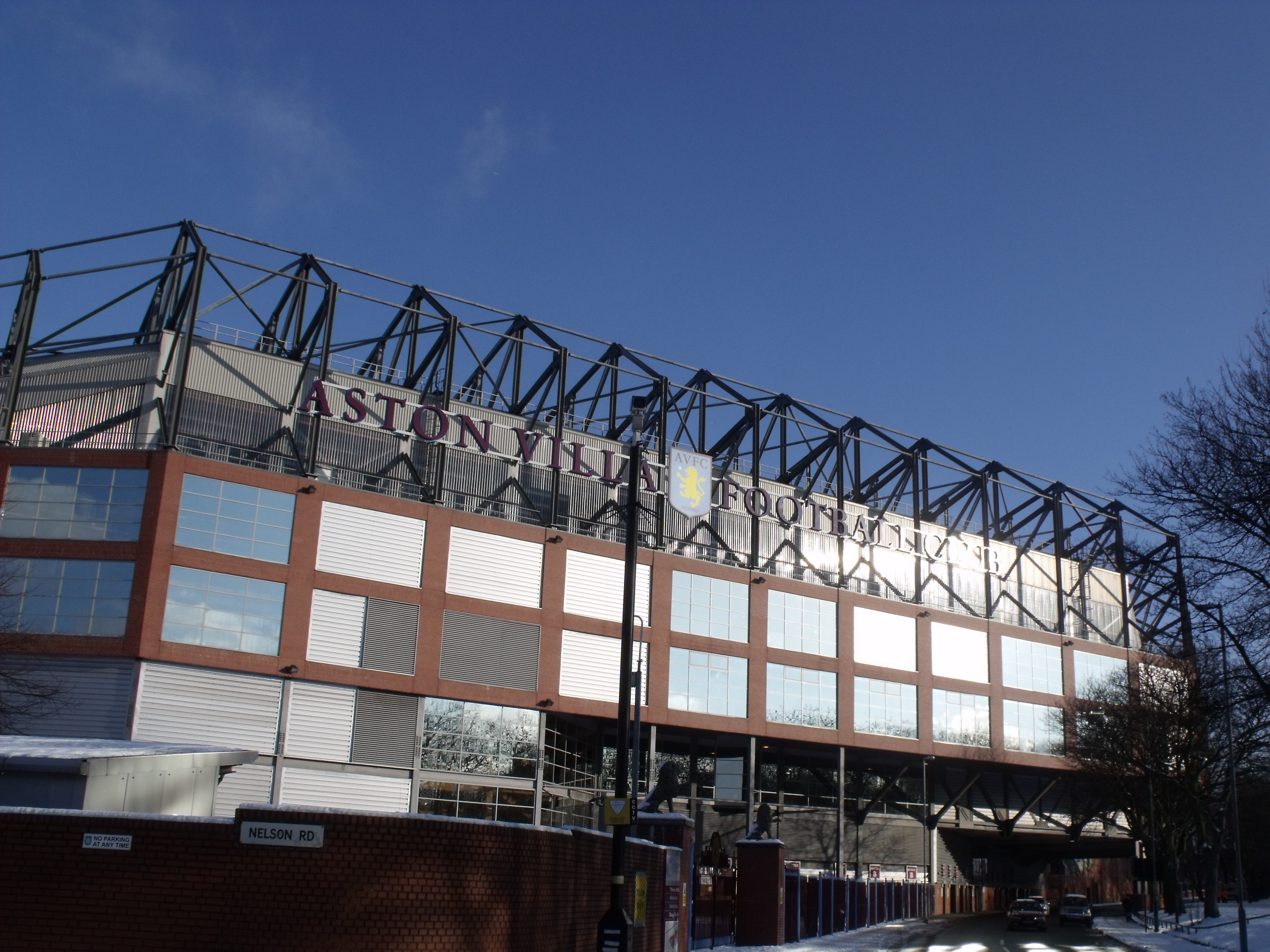
The facade of the new Trinity Road Stand, built over the Trinity Road

The oldest stand at Villa Park is the North Stand, formerly known as the Witton End, completed in 1977. It is a two-tiered stand, with a double row of 39 executive boxes running between the two tiers. Upper-tier seats are claret with "AV" written in blue; the lower tier consists of sky blue seats. The North Stand was "the first major stand in Britain to use what is now broadly termed the 'goalpost' structure." The facade of the stand is a "textured concrete render" typical of the time.

Since the segregation of supporters in the 1970s, away fans had been situated in the lower tier of the North Stand. Former manager Martin O'Neill expressed his desire to have Villa fans seated in the North Stand to improve the atmosphere at Villa Park. For the start of the 2007–2008 season the club released cut-price season tickets for the lower tier of the stand. This meant moving the away fans to the northern end of the Doug Ellis Stand across both tiers and since then the North Stand has been fully occupied by Villa supporters with the most vocal and fervent being housed in the lower tier.

Under Doug Ellis, by 1998, 2,700 three-course match-day meals were being served across five restaurants, a banqueting hall and 95 executive boxes. The Doug Ellis Stand, formerly known as the Witton Lane Stand, is a two-tiered stand with a row of executive boxes between the tiers. The roof was originally planned to be a goalpost structure, the same as the Holte End and North Stand, but the plans were changed to a simpler cantilever design. It saw slight refurbishment before the 1996 European Championships to join the corners with the lower tier of the North Stand, improve legroom and increase the curve of the terracing to improve sightlines. The main television camera viewpoint is on the half-way line in the Doug Ellis Stand.

In the south-west corner, between the Holte End and the Trinity Road Stand, there is a three-storey pavilion-like structure, which is used for corporate hospitality. There is a large television screen. On 28 November 2009, a bronze statue of former Villa chairman and Football League founder William McGregor was unveiled outside the stadium. Behind the North Stand is 'The Sports Illustrated Warehouse', a 3,500-capacity entertainment venue which opened in 2026, as well as a club shop.

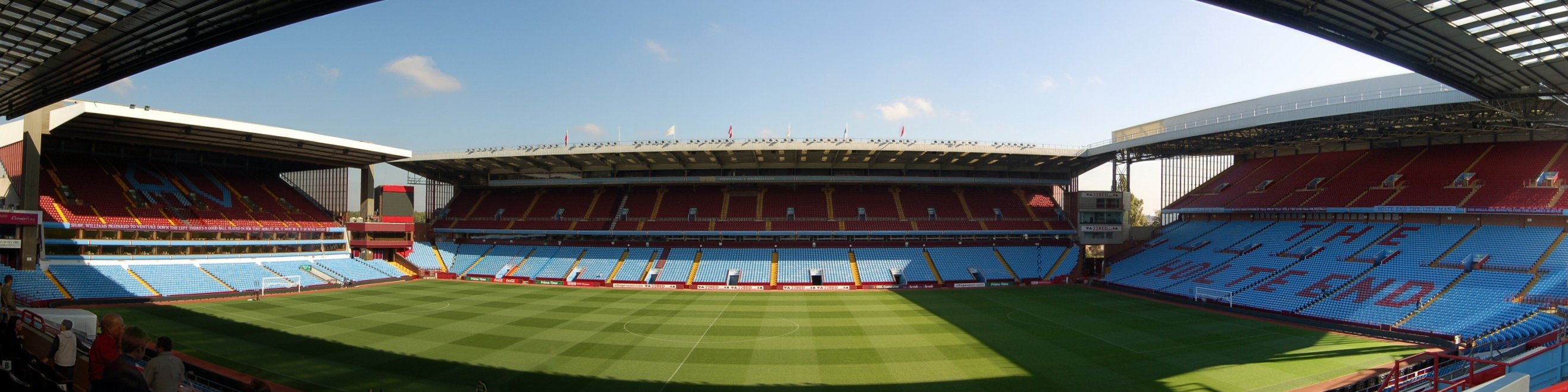
A panorama of Villa Park from the Trinity Road Stand, showing from left to right the North Stand, the Doug Ellis Stand and the Holte End

== Future ==
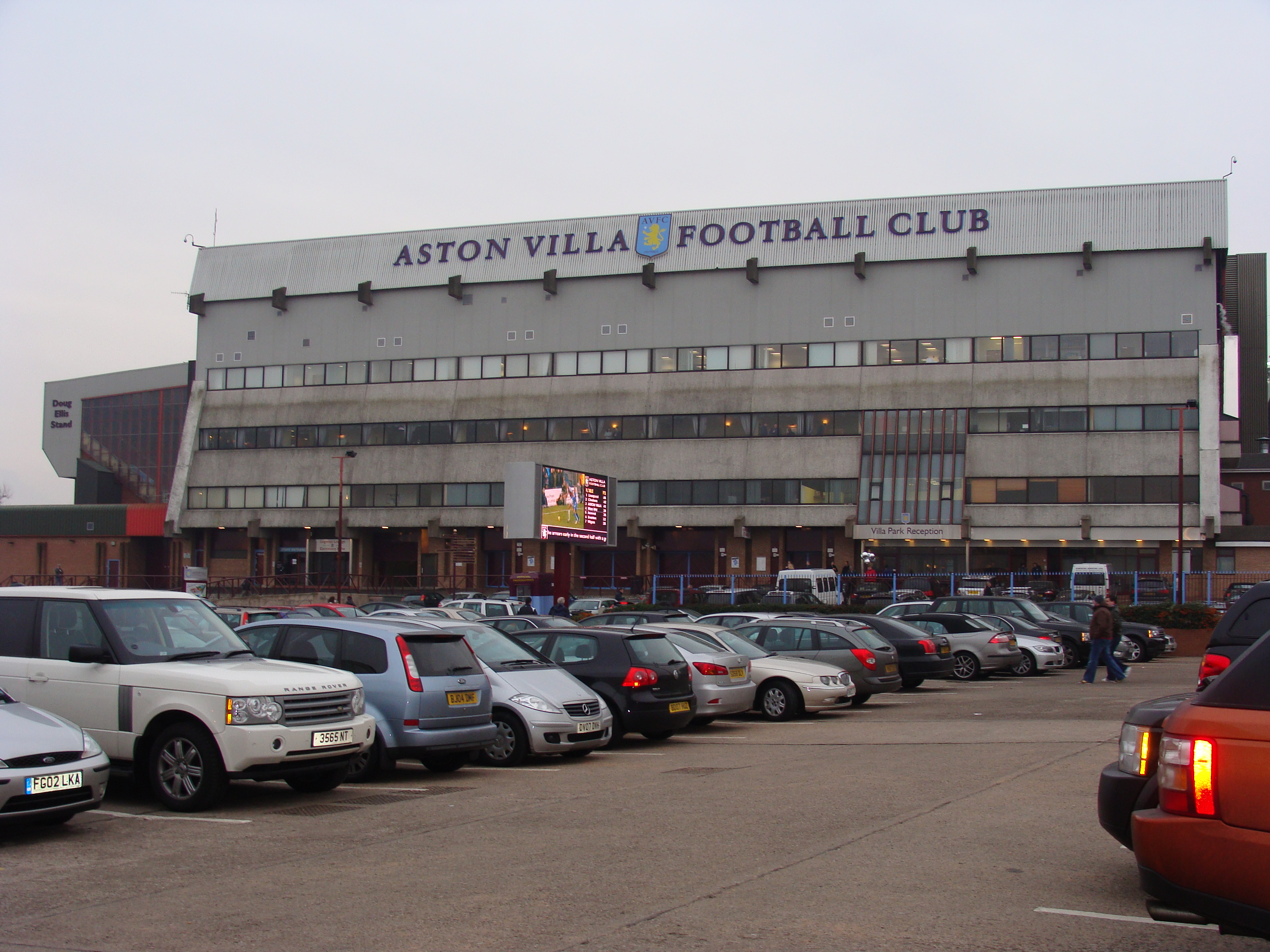
The concrete facade of the North Stand, the oldest stand at Villa Park

Future redevelopment of Villa Park has been an ever-present topic, with previous owners of Aston Villa: notably Randy Lerner and Tony Xia, expressing support to increase capacity. However, no definitive redevelopment occurred in either case.

Under the current ownership of Nassef Sawiris and Wes Edens, there has been concrete support for a long-term redevelopment of Villa Park. In December 2021, CEO Christian Purslow announced that redevelopment plans were forecasted to take "two to ten years".

Preliminary plans to construct a new North Stand were announced in March 2022. Following a consultation process between June and September 2022, Aston Villa formally submitted plans to fully demolish and rebuild the North Stand, alongside developments to the Trinity Road Stand. The plans would see the construction of a new 13,074 capacity stand. Alongside minor seating adjustments to the Trinity Road Stand and Doug Ellis Stand, this would increase Villa Park's capacity to approximately 50,065. Within the aforementioned planning documents, Aston Villa alluded to potential further redevelopment via 'configuration of the stands', including the Doug Ellis Stand and the Holte End, to increase Villa Park's capacity to between 52,000 and 53,000 at a later date. In December 2022, planning permission was granted by Birmingham City Council. However, in December 2023, President of Football Operations Chris Heck paused the plans due to concerns over temporary reduction of stadium capacity and concerns over public transportation.

In April 2025, Aston Villa announced revised plans for the expansion to the North Stand; the new design would adapt and reuse the pre-existing North Stand as opposed to demolishing it. The plans are seeing Villa Park's capacity increase to "over 50,000". The North Stand expansion was approved by the Birmingham City Council on the 28th August 2025, with construction set to be completed by the beginning of the 2027/28 season in August 2027. This expansion has been viewed by the club as essential in retaining its place in the UEFA Euro 2028 lineup.

== Other sporting uses ==
=== Football ===
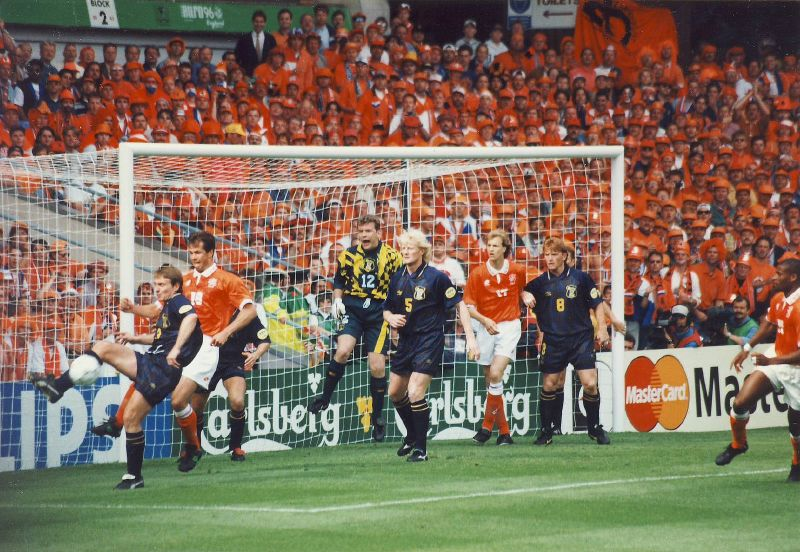
A 1996 European championship game between Scotland and the Netherlands

Villa Park was the first English ground to stage international football in three centuries and has hosted matches in several international tournaments. Three 1966 World Cup matches were played at the ground and four matches during Euro '96. The ground has hosted England internationals, the first in 1899 and the most recent in 2005. Sixteen international matches have been hosted at the stadium in total. In 2025, the stadium hosted its first England game in 20 years, due to Coldplay concerts at Wembley Stadium.

Villa Park has been the venue for several Cup competitions. It has hosted 55 FA Cup semi-finals, more than any other stadium. The club hosted the League Cup Final in 1980–1981 when Liverpool beat West Ham 2–1 in a replay. In 1999, the stadium hosted the last final of the European Cup Winners' Cup in which Lazio beat Real Mallorca 2–1. During the construction of the new Wembley Stadium between 2001 and 2005, the FA Trophy Final was held at Villa Park. The 2012 Community Shield was held at Villa Park instead of Wembley due to Olympic Games at the stadium. Villa Park was originally listed as one of the six stadiums that would hold Olympic football matches that summer, but in 2009 the organising committee for the games and Aston Villa ruled it out due to uncertainty around expansion plans.

==== 1966 FIFA World Cup ====
Date	Time (BST)	Team #1	Result	Team #2	Round	Spectators
13 July 1966	19:30	Argentina	2–1	Spain	Group 2	42,738
16 July 1966	15:00	Argentina	0–0	West Germany	Group 2	46,587
20 July 1966	19:30	West Germany	2–1	Spain	Group 2	42,187

==== UEFA Euro 1996 ====
Date	Time (BST)	Team #1	Result	Team #2	Round	Spectators
10 June 1996	16:30	Netherlands	0–0	Scotland	Group A	34,363
13 June 1996	19:30	Switzerland	0–2	Netherlands	Group A	36,800
18 June 1996	19:30	Scotland	1–0	Switzerland	Group A	34,926
23 June 1996	18:30	Czech Republic	1–0	Portugal	Quarter-finals	26,832

==== UEFA Euro 2028 ====
Date	Time (BST)	Team #1	Result	Team #2	Round	Spectators
11 June 2028	--:--	C3	–	C4	Group C	
15 June 2028	--:--	B2	–	B4	Group B	
20 June 2028	--:--	D4	–	D1	Group D	
27 June 2028	--:--	Winner Group D	–	Runner-up Group F	Round of 16	

=== Rugby ===
Great Britain secured the first ever rugby league test series at the ground when they defeated the touring Australian Kangaroos side 6–5 on 14 February 1909 in front of a crowd of 9,000. A second rugby league game followed three years later on New Year's Day 1912 when 4,000 people turned up to see Australia beat Great Britain 33–8. The stadium has seen several international rugby union tour matches. On 8 October 1924, a North Midlands XV lost 40–3 to the New Zealand side touring Europe and Canada at the time. The second game took place on 30 December 1953 when Midlands Counties played another New Zealand side on their 1953–1954 tour of United Kingdom, Ireland, France and North America. The Midlands side lost 18–3.

Villa Park was chosen as the venue for two pool matches in the 2015 Rugby World Cup. The first was a Pool B match between South Africa and Samoa on 26 September 2015 with South Africa winning 46–6 with 39,526 in attendance. The second was a Pool A match between Australia and Uruguay the next day with Australia winning 65–3 in front of 39,605 spectators.

Birmingham hosted the 2022 Commonwealth Games. Though Villa Park was originally chosen to host the Rugby Sevens competition, the event was moved to the Coventry Building Society Arena in Coventry. This was because the Premier League began in July while the games were on, in order to accommodate the 2022 FIFA World Cup in Qatar at the end of the year.

In July 2025, it was announced that Villa Park would host Premiership Rugby on 28 March 2026. The game was between Gloucester and Leicester Tigers and formed part of the league's 'Big Game' weekend. The two teams competed for the Slater Cup, with holders Leicester Tigers winning the game 36–17 to retain the cup.

=== Other sports ===
The venue has also hosted two first-class cricket matches. The first was the United North of England Eleven's final first-class match against a London United Eleven in June 1879. The second was a tour match played between the Australians and an England XI side in May 1884. The ground also hosted a 1897 Minor Counties Championship match between Staffordshire and Northamptonshire and was the home ground for Aston Unity in the Birmingham and District Premier League from 1889 to 1954.

Many athletics and cycle events took place at the ground before the First World War, and boxing has been hosted on several occasions. On 28 June 1948, Dick Turpin, brother of Randolph Turpin, became the first non-white boxer to win a British title in a fight against Vince Hawkins in front of 40,000 spectators after the British Boxing Board of Control lifted their ban on non-whites challenging for titles. On 21 June 1972 Danny McAlinden defeated Jack Bodell in a British and Empire Heavyweight title fight.

On 26 August 1985, it played host to the first ever American football "Summerbowl," intended to be the English equivalent to the Super Bowl. The game was played between the London Ravens and the Streatham Olympians, and the low attendance of 8,000 meant that the Summerbowl was not repeated in subsequent years.

== Non-sporting uses ==
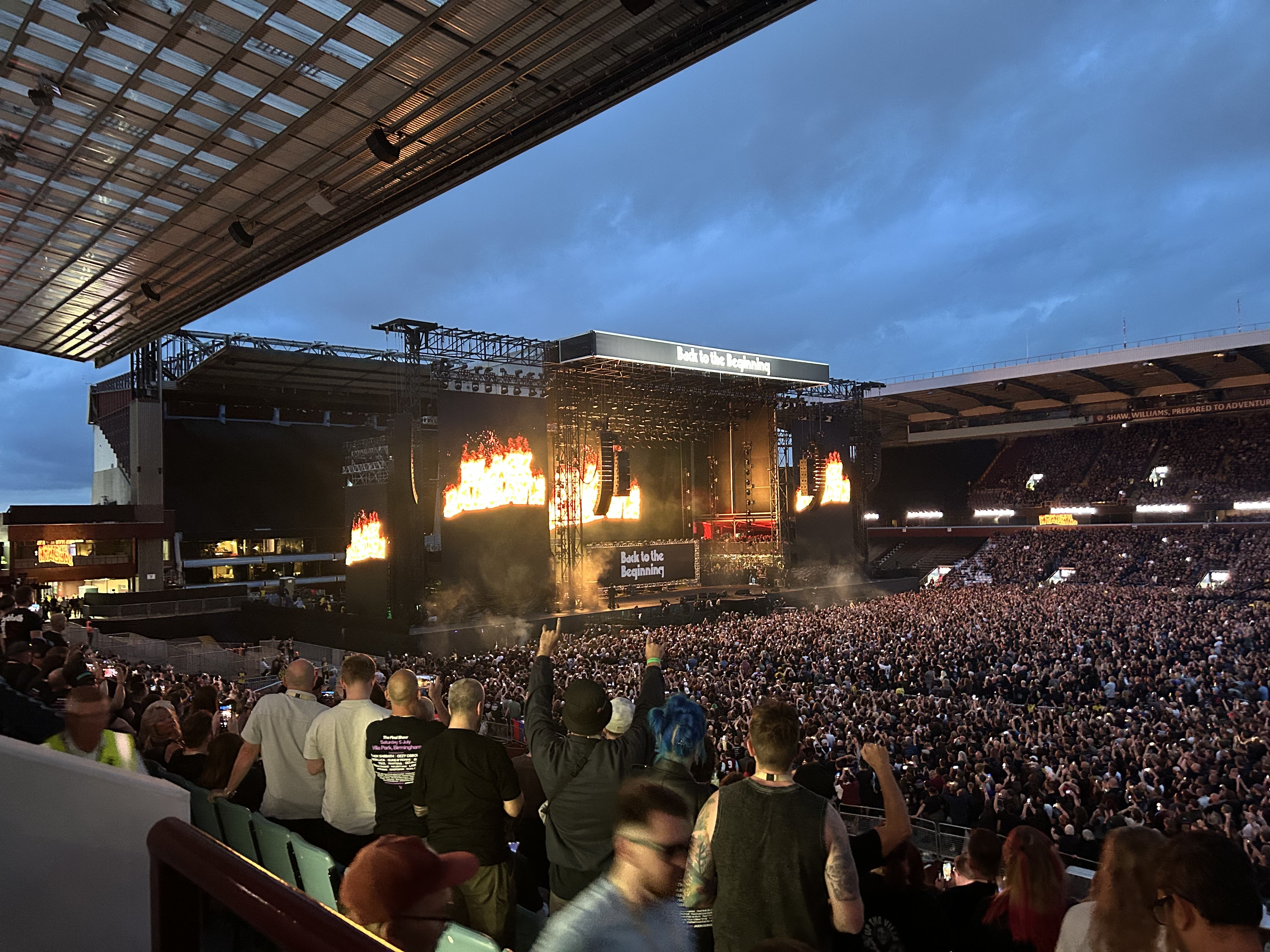
Back to the Beginning, 5 July 2025

The American evangelist Billy Graham attracted 257,181 people to a series of prayer meetings held at the stadium in mid-1984. Archbishop Desmond Tutu held a religious gathering at the stadium in 1989.

During the COVID-19 pandemic, it was announced that midwives from Sandwell and West Birmingham Hospitals NHS Trust would host maternity clinics at the ground, for expectant parents anxious about going into hospitals. From February 2021, Villa Park was used as a regional COVID-19 vaccination centre by the NHS. The vaccination centre was set up in the Holte End.

Villa Park has hosted many rock concerts, including Bruce Springsteen who played two concerts in June 1988 as part of his Tunnel of Love Tour, and again in June 2023 as part of his E Street Band 2023 Tour, Bon Jovi in 2013 as part of the Because We Can: The Tour, and Pink in June 2023 during her Summer Carnival Tour. Duran Duran held a charity concert in 1983 to raise money for MENCAP. Other singers who have played at the ground include Belinda Carlisle, Rod Stewart, Robert Palmer, Guns N' Roses, Chris Brown, Kendrick Lamar and SZA.

On 5 July 2025, the stadium hosted Ozzy Osbourne's and Black Sabbath's final concert, Back to the Beginning. 17 days after the concert, Osbourne died at the age of 76. His funeral procession on 30 July began from Villa Park.

== Average league attendances ==
Season	League	Capacity	Attendance	% Full
2000–01	Premier League	39,399	31,470	80%
2001–02	Premier League	42,682	35,016	82%
2002–03	Premier League	42,682	34,975	82%
2003–04	Premier League	42,682	36,622	86%
2004–05	Premier League	42,682	37,354	87%
2005–06	Premier League	42,682	34,112	80%
2006–07	Premier League	42,682	36,214	85%
2007–08	Premier League	42,682	40,396	94%
2008–09	Premier League	42,682	39,812	93%
2009–10	Premier League	42,682	38,573	90%
2010–11	Premier League	42,682	37,194	87%
2011–12	Premier League	42,682	33,883	79%
2012–13	Premier League	42,682	35,060	82%
2013–14	Premier League	42,682	36,081	84%
2014–15	Premier League	42,682	34,133	80%
2015–16	Premier League	42,682	33,690	79%
2016–17	Championship	42,682	32,107	75%
2017–18	Championship	42,785	32,235	75%
2018–19	Championship	42,682	35,379	83%
2019–20	Premier League	42,682	41,661	98%
2020–21	Premier League	42,682	0	0%
2021–22	Premier League	42,682	41,849	98%
2022–23	Premier League	42,657	41,679	98%
2023–24	Premier League	42,640	41,384	97%
2024–25	Premier League	43,157	41,873	97%
2025–26	Premier League	43,157	41,969	97%

== Records ==
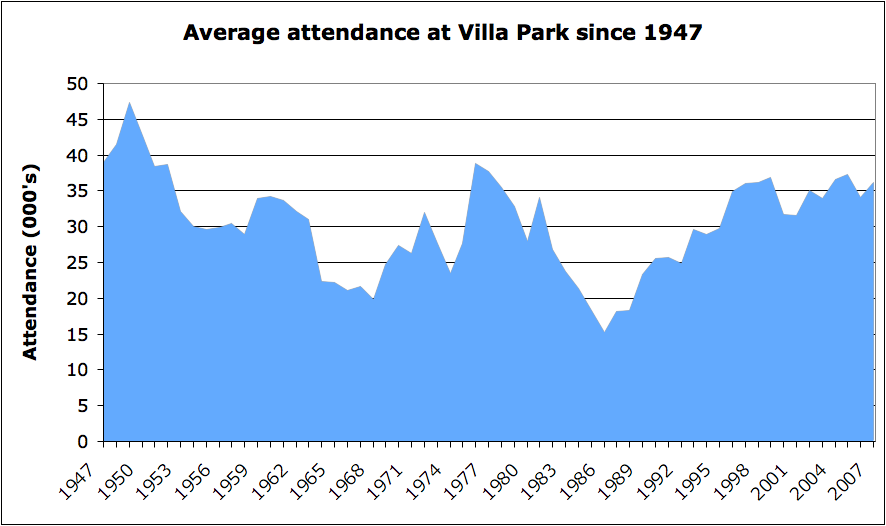
A chart showing the average attendance at Villa Park from 1947 to 2008

The highest attendance recorded at Villa Park was 76,588, on 2 March 1946 in an FA Cup 6th round tie against Derby County. The highest attendance as an all seater stadium was 43,157, for a Premier League game against Manchester United on 21 December 2025. The overall record league attendance was 69,492 in a First Division match against Wolverhampton Wanderers on 27 December 1949. The highest average post-Second World War attendance at Villa Park was 47,168 in the 1948–1949 season; the lowest average post-war attendance was 15,237 in the 1985–1986 season.

== Transport ==
Villa Park is within a short distance of two mainline railway stations. Witton railway station is approximately 500 metres (0.3 miles) from Villa Park, and Aston railway station is approximately 1.5 kilometres (0.9 miles). Under former owner Randy Lerner, there have been discussions on changing the name of Witton Station to Villa Park as is the case with West Bromwich Albion's local railway station, The Hawthorns. Aston Villa's former CEO, Bruce Langham, has said that the West Midlands Passenger Transport Executive (Centro) are amenable to the idea as long as it is done at the expense of the club. No action has yet been taken.

== See also ==
- Development of stadiums in English football
