= Willy Allemann =

Swiss football defender (1942–2010)

Personal information
- Date of birth: 10 June 1942
- Place of birth: Switzerland
- Date of death: 22 September 2009 (aged 67)
- Position: Defender

Senior career*
Years	Team	Apps	(Gls)
1964-1966	FC Grenchen		
1966-1968	Grasshoppers		
1968-1971	BSC Young Boys		
1971-1974	FC Luzern		
1974-1975	FC Ebikon		

International career
1966	Switzerland	1	(0)
- * Club domestic league appearances and goals

Willy Allemann (10 June 1942 – September 22, 2009) was a Swiss football defender who played for Switzerland in the 1966 FIFA World Cup. He also played for FC Grenchen and BSC Young Boys.

Allemann died in 2009.
