= Mario Prosperi =

Swiss footballer (born 1945)

Personal information
- Full name: Mario Prosperi
- Date of birth: 4 August 1945 (age 81)
- Place of birth: Switzerland

International career
Years	Team	Apps	(Gls)
- Switzerland

Mario Prosperi (born 4 August 1945 in Melide) is a retired Swiss football goalkeeper.

He got 21 caps for Switzerland between 26 May 1965 and 9 May 1973. He was an unused substitute at the 1966 World Cup. He played in qualifying games for both the 1970 FIFA World Cup and 1974 FIFA World Cup.

== Clubs ==
- 1963–1976 : FC Lugano
- 1976–1981 : FC Chiasso
