= Rodongja Sports Club =

North Korean association football club

Rodongja 로동자
- Full name: Rodongja Sports Club 로동자체육단
- League: DPR Korea League

Rodongja Sports Club (Korean: 로동자체육단) is a North Korean football club. Rodongja means worker in Korean.
