= Nelson López =

Argentine footballer (1941–1980)

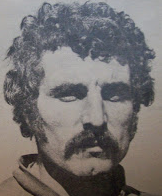

Personal information
- Date of birth: 24 June 1941
- Place of birth: Argentina
- Date of death: 17 January 1980 (aged 38)
- Position: Defender

Senior career*
Years	Team	Apps	(Gls)
- Club Atlético Banfield

International career
- Argentina
- * Club domestic league appearances and goals

Nelson López (24 June 1941 – 17 January 1980) was an Argentine football defender who played for Argentina in the 1966 FIFA World Cup. He also played for Club Atlético Banfield. López died on 17 January 1980, at the age of 38.
