= Jean-Claude Piumi =

French footballer (1940-1996)

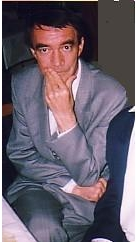
- Piumi in 1989

Personal information
- Full name: Jean-Claude Piumi
- Date of birth: 27 May 1940
- Place of birth: Giraumont, France
- Date of death: 24 March 1996 (aged 55)
- Position: Defender

Youth career
- –1959: Giraumont

Senior career*
Years	Team	Apps	(Gls)
1958–1959	Giraumont		
1970–1972	Valenciennes	318	(5)
1970–1972	Monaco	22	(0)
1972–1973	Stade Raphaëlois		
Total		340	(22)

International career
1962–1967	France	4	(1)
- * Club domestic league appearances and goals

Jean-Claude Piumi (27 May 1940 – 24 March 1996) was a French former football defender.

== Career statistics ==
=== International ===
Appearances and goals by national team and year
National team	Year	Apps	Goals
France	1962	1	1
France	1963	1	0
France	1964	0	0
France	1965	0	0
France	1966	0	0
France	1967	2	0
Total		4	1

Scores and results list France's goal tally first, score column indicates score after each Piumi goal.

List of international goals scored by Jean-Claude Piumi
No.	Date	Venue	Opponent	Score	Result	Competition
1	5 May 1962	Stadio Artemio Franchi, Florence, Italy	Italy	1–0	1–2	Friendly
