= Rolando Irusta =

Argentine footballer (1938-2012

Personal information
- Full name: Rolando Hugo Irusta
- Date of birth: 27 March 1938
- Place of birth: Córdoba, Argentina
- Date of death: 31 January 2012 (aged 73)
- Place of death: Azul
- Position: Goalkeeper

Senior career*
Years	Team	Apps	(Gls)
1962-1966	Club Atlético Lanús		

International career
1966	Argentina		
- * Club domestic league appearances and goals

Rolando Hugo Irusta (27 March 1938 – 31 January 2012) was an Argentine football goalkeeper who was in Argentina's squad for the 1966 FIFA World Cup. He also played for Club Atlético Lanús and Excursionistas

== International career ==
Irusta was called up to Argentina's squad for the 1966 FIFA World Cup but he didn't play any match.

== Personal life ==
Irusta had a younger brother, Agustín Irusta, and a son, Gustavo Irusta, both professional goalkeepers like him.

== Death ==
Irusta died on 31 January 2012, at the age of 73
