= Manuel Duarte =

Portuguese footballer (1945–2022)

Personal information
- Full name: Manuel Almeida Duarte
- Date of birth: 29 May 1945
- Place of birth: Celorico de Basto, Portugal
- Date of death: 2 September 2022 (aged 77)
- Place of death: Fafe, Portugal
- Position: Striker

Senior career*
Years	Team	Apps	(Gls)
1962–1964	Académica	12	(6)
1964–1966	Leixões	38	(14)
1966–1970	Sporting CP	27	(12)
1970–1971	Porto	2	(0)
1971–1972	Varzim		
1972–1978	Fafe		
1978–1979	Cabeceirense		
1979–1980	Limianos		
1981–1982	Felgueiras		
1982–1984	Mondinense		

International career
1966	Portugal	2	(0)
Medal record
Men's football
Representing Portugal
FIFA World Cup
Third place	1966 England
- * Club domestic league appearances and goals

Manuel Almeida Duarte (29 May 1945 – 2 September 2022) was a Portuguese footballer who played as a striker.

== Club career ==
Duarte was born in Celorico de Basto, Braga District. In a 16–year professional career he played for Académica de Coimbra, Leixões SC, Sporting CP, FC Porto, Varzim S.C. and AD Fafe, amassing Primeira Liga totals of 79 matches and 32 goals over nine seasons and competing in the Segunda Liga with the last two clubs. He retired at the age of 39, after five years in amateur football with four sides.

Duarte scored a career-best 11 goals (in only 19 games) in the 1966–67 campaign, helping Sporting to the fourth position.

== International career ==
Duarte earned two caps for Portugal in 1966, being an unused squad member at that year's FIFA World Cup.

== Death ==
Duarte died in Fafe on 2 September 2022, aged 77.
