= Mario Chaldú =

Argentine footballer (1942–2020)

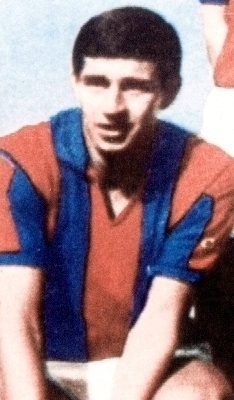

Personal information
- Full name: Mario Norberto Chaldú
- Date of birth: 6 June 1942
- Place of birth: Buenos Aires, Argentina
- Date of death: 1 April 2020 (aged 77)
- Position: Forward

Senior career*
Years	Team	Apps	(Gls)
1961–1965	CA Banfield	119	(21)
1966	San Lorenzo de Almagro	19	(3)
1968–1969	Racing Club	10	(2)
1971	CA Kimberley	9	(2 f)
Total		157	(28)

International career
	Argentina	5	(0)
- * Club domestic league appearances and goals

Mario Norberto Chaldú (6 June 1942 – 1 April 2020) was an Argentine football forward who played for Argentina in the 1966 FIFA World Cup. He also played for CA Banfield, San Lorenzo de Almagro, Racing Club and Kimberley in the Argentinian League system.

Chaldú died on 1 April 2020, in a Monte Grande clinic after a prolonged illness.
