= Moranbong Sports Club =

Moranbong 모란봉
- Full name: Moranbong Sports Club 모란봉체육단
- Founded: 1970; 56 years ago
- Ground: Home stadium is unclear Based in Pyongyang
- League: DPR Korea League

Moranbong Sports Club (Chosŏn'gŭl: 모란봉체육단. Hanja: 牡丹峰體育團) is a North Korean defunct multi-sports club based in Pyongyang. Its football club used to play in the DPRK League, the top division of the North Korean football league.

== History ==
Moranbong Sports Club was founded in 1970 in Pyongyang, the capital of North Korea. The club was started as a youth sport club.

== Former players ==
- Li Keun-hak
- Park Doo-ik
- Shin Yung-kyoo
- Pak Seung-zin

== Other sports ==
The club has participated in other sports, such as judo, table tennis, and softball. Their women judo team include Kye Sun-hui, who won the World Judo Championships four times and An Kum-ae, who won two bronze medals at the same competition.

== See also ==
- Moranbong
- List of football clubs in North Korea
