= Heinz Bäni =

Swiss footballer (1936–2014)

Personal information
- Date of birth: 18 November 1936
- Place of birth: Zofingen, Switzerland
- Date of death: 10 March 2014 (aged 77)
- Position: Midfielder

Senior career*
Years	Team	Apps	(Gls)
1957–1960	Grasshopper Club Zürich		
1960–1966	FC Zürich		
1966–1968	FC La Chaux-de-Fonds		

International career
1958–1967	Switzerland	14	(0)
- * Club domestic league appearances and goals

Heinz Bäni (18 November 1936 – 10 March 2014) was a Swiss football midfielder who played for Switzerland in the 1966 FIFA World Cup. He also played for Grasshopper Club Zürich, FC Zürich, and FC La Chaux-de-Fonds.
