= Arturo Chaires =

Mexican footballer (1937–2020)

Personal information
- Full name: Arturo Chaires Riso
- Date of birth: 14 March 1937
- Place of birth: Guadalajara, Jalisco, Mexico
- Date of death: 18 June 2020 (aged 83)
- Position: Defender

Senior career*
Years	Team	Apps	(Gls)
1960–1971	Guadalajara		

International career
1961–1967	Mexico	22	(0)
- * Club domestic league appearances and goals

Arturo Chaires Riso (14 March 1937 – 18 June 2020) was a Mexican football defender who played for Mexico in the 1962 and 1966 FIFA World Cups. He also played for C.D. Guadalajara.
