= Joseph Bonnel =

French footballer (1939–2018)

Personal information
- Full name: Joseph Bonnel
- Date of birth: 4 January 1939
- Place of birth: Florensac, France
- Date of death: 13 February 2018 (aged 79)
- Place of death: Pézenas, France
- Height: 1.71 m (5 ft 7 in)
- Position: Midfielder

Senior career*
Years	Team	Apps	(Gls)
1957–1959	Montpellier		
1959–1967	Valenciennes		
1967–1973	Marseille	195	(43)
1973–1978	AS Béziers		

International career
1962–1969	France	25	(1)

Managerial career
- 1973: Marseille
- 1973–1978: AS Béziers
- 1978–1983: Aubagne
- * Club domestic league appearances and goals

Joseph Bonnel (4 January 1939 – 13 February 2018) was a French football midfielder who represented France in the FIFA World Cup 1966. He scored three goals during the 1966 season.

Bonnel injured the English goalscorer Jimmy Greaves in the group stages of the 1966 World Cup, causing Greaves to require 14 stitches in his leg and miss all further appearances in the competition, including his possible appearance in the final where his replacement Geoff Hurst scored a hat-trick.

== Titles ==
- French Championship in 1971, 1972 with Olympique Marseille
- Coupe de France in 1969 and 1972 with Olympique Marseille
