= Jorge Manicera =

Uruguayan footballer (1938-2012)

Personal information
- Full name: Jorge Carlos Manicera Fuentes
- Date of birth: 4 November 1938
- Place of birth: Montevideo, Uruguay
- Date of death: 18 September 2012 (aged 73)

International career
Years	Team	Apps	(Gls)
1962–1967	Uruguay	22	(0)

Jorge Carlos Manicera Fuentes (4 November 1938 – 18 September 2012) was a Uruguayan football defender.

Manicera made 22 appearances for the Uruguay national football team from 1962 to 1967, and played in the 1966 FIFA World Cup.

He died on 18 September 2012, and is buried at Buceo Cemetery.

== Clubs ==
- 1958-1961 - Rampla Juniors
- 1962-1966 - Nacional
- 1967-1970 - Flamengo
- 1971-???? - CA Cerro

== Honours ==
- Uruguayan League - 1963, 1966
- Played in 1966 FIFA World Cup
