= Magdaleno Mercado =

Mexican footballer (1944–2020)

Personal information
- Full name: Magdaleno Mercado Gutiérrez
- Date of birth: 4 April 1944
- Place of birth: Mexico
- Date of death: 6 March 2020 (aged 75)
- Position: Midfielder

Senior career*
Years	Team	Apps	(Gls)
1964–1968	Club Atlas	?	(?)

International career
1966–1968	Mexico	8	(0)
- * Club domestic league appearances and goals

Magdaleno Mercado Gutiérrez (4 April 1944 – 6 March 2020) was a Mexican professional footballer who played as a midfielder for Mexico in the 1966 FIFA World Cup. He also played for Club Atlas.
