= Marcel Aubour =

French footballer (born 1940)

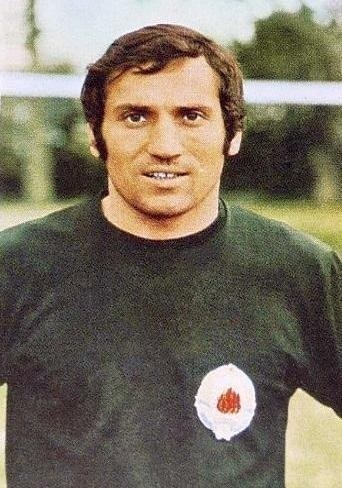
- Aubour in 1970

Personal information
- Date of birth: 17 June 1940 (age 86)
- Place of birth: Saint-Tropez, Var, France
- Height: 1.80 m (5 ft 11 in)
- Position: Goalkeeper

Youth career
- Lyon

Senior career*
Years	Team	Apps	(Gls)
1960–1966	Lyon	153	(0)
1966–1969	Nice	96	(0)
1969–1972	Rennes	86	(0)
1972–1977	Reims	147	(0)
Total		482	(0)

International career
1964–1968	France	20	(0)
- * Club domestic league appearances and goals

Marcel Aubour (born 17 June 1940) is a retired French international footballer who played as goalkeeper. He was the first choice goalkeeper for France in the FIFA World Cup 1966.

== Honours ==
Lyon

- Coupe de France: 1964; runner-up 1963

Rennes

- Coupe de France: 1971
