= Hansruedi Führer =

Swiss footballer (born 1937)

Personal information
- Date of birth: 24 December 1937 (age 88)
- Place of birth: Bern, Switzerland
- Position: Defender

Senior career*
Years	Team	Apps	(Gls)
1959–1966	BSC Young Boys		
1966–1969	Grasshopper Club Zürich		
1969–1970	FC St. Gallen		

International career
1965–1969	Switzerland	19	(0)

Managerial career
- 1970: FC St. Gallen
- * Club domestic league appearances and goals

Hansruedi Führer (born 24 December 1937) is a Swiss former footballer who played as a defender. He played for Switzerland in the 1966 FIFA World Cup. He also played for BSC Young Boys and Grasshopper Club Zürich.
