= Gabriel Núñez (footballer, born 1942) =

Mexican footballer (1942–2021)

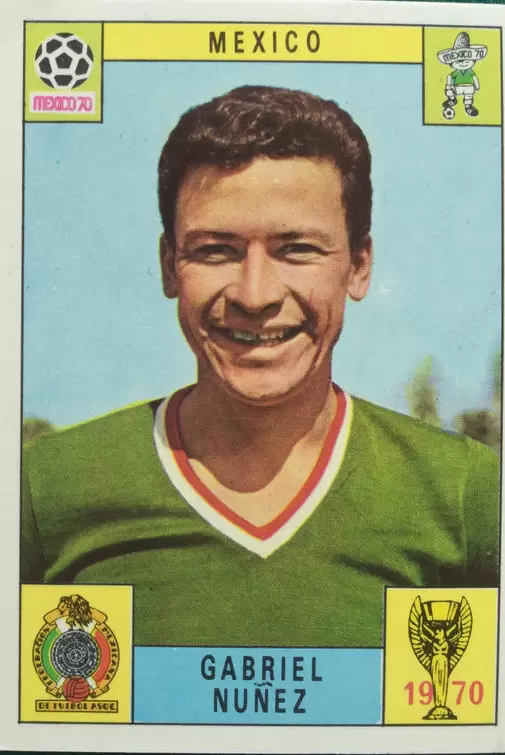
- Núñez in 1970

Personal information
- Full name: Gabriel Núñez Aguirre
- Date of birth: 6 February 1942
- Place of birth: Taxco, Guerrero, Mexico
- Date of death: 11 November 2021 (aged 79)
- Place of death: Huitzilac, Morelos, Mexico
- Position: Defender

Senior career*
Years	Team	Apps	(Gls)
1959–1966	Zacatepec		
1966–1970	América		
1970–1972	Zacatepec		
1972–1974	Toluca		
1974–1976	Jalisco		
1976–1978	Zacatepec		

International career
1965–1970	Mexico	35	(0)
- * Club domestic league appearances and goals

Gabriel Núñez Aguirre (6 February 1942 – 11 November 2021) was a Mexican football defender who played for Mexico national team in the 1966 FIFA World Cup. He also played for Atlético Zacatepec.

Núñez died from cancer on 11 November 2021, at the age of 79. His cousin is María Rebollo Aguirre, the cook.
