= Kurt Armbruster =

Swiss footballer (1934–2019)

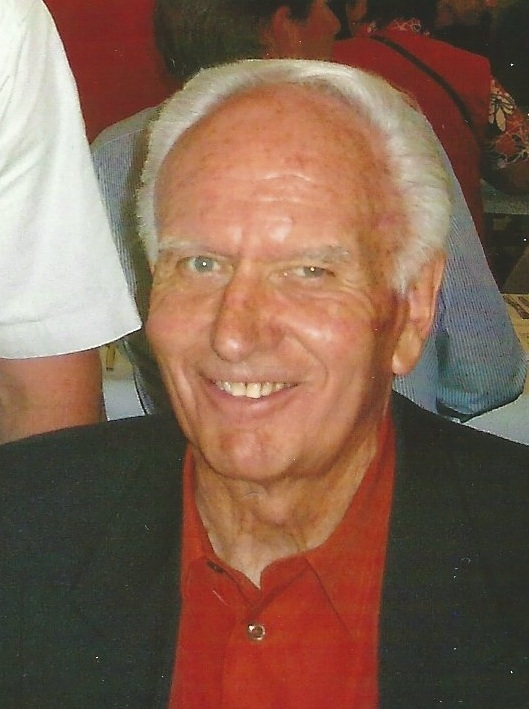

Personal information
- Date of birth: 16 September 1934
- Place of birth: Zürich, Switzerland
- Date of death: 14 March 2019 (aged 84)
- Position: Midfielder

Senior career*
Years	Team	Apps	(Gls)
- FC Lausanne-Sport

International career
1963–1967	Switzerland	6	(0)
- * Club domestic league appearances and goals

Kurt Armbruster (16 September 1934 – 14 March 2019) was a Swiss football midfielder who played for Switzerland in the 1966 FIFA World Cup. He also played for FC Lausanne-Sport.
