= Alberto Mario González =

Argentine footballer (1941–2023)

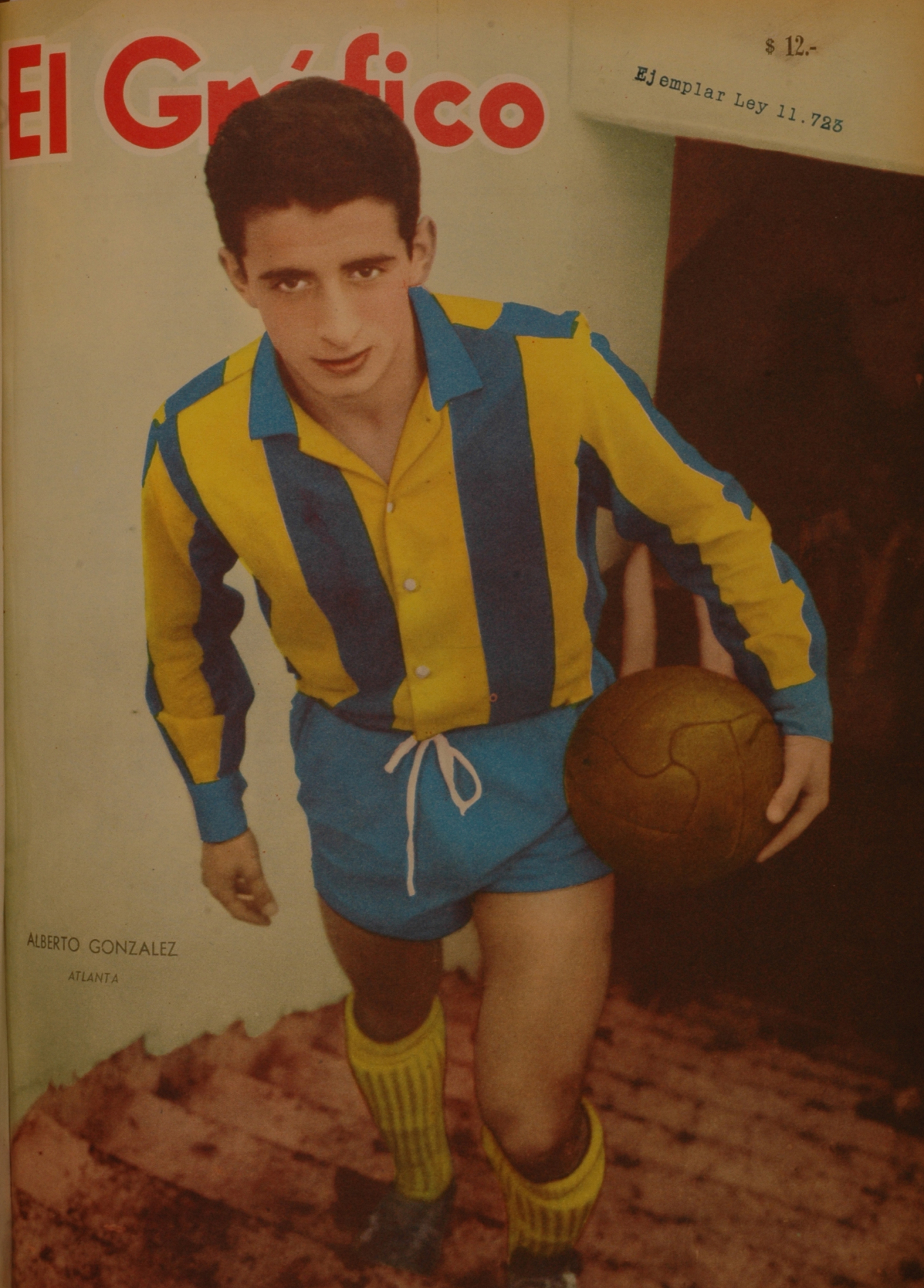
- González in 1961

Personal information
- Full name: Alberto Mario González
- Date of birth: 21 August 1941
- Place of birth: Buenos Aires, Argentina
- Date of death: 26 February 2023 (aged 81)
- Height: 1.72 m (5 ft 8 in)
- Position: Forward

Senior career*
Years	Team	Apps	(Gls)
1958-1961	Atlanta	49	(7)
1962-1968	Boca Juniors	189	(12)
1969	Banfield	24	(1)
?	Unión Española		
1974	Deportivo Morón	3	(0)

International career
1961-1967	Argentina	19	(1)

Managerial career
- 1974: Deportivo Morón
- 1978: CA Estudiantes
- 1984: Boca Juniors
- 1989-1990: Deportivo Español
- * Club domestic league appearances and goals

Alberto Mario González (21 August 1941 – 26 February 2023) was an Argentine footballer who played as a forward for Argentina in the 1962 and 1966 FIFA World Cups. He also played for Boca Juniors.
