= January 1935 =

Month of 1935

<<	January 1935					>>
Su	Mo	Tu	We	Th	Fr	Sa
		1	2	3	4	5
6	7	8	9	10	11	12
13	14	15	16	17	18	19
20	21	22	23	24	25	26
27	28	29	30	31

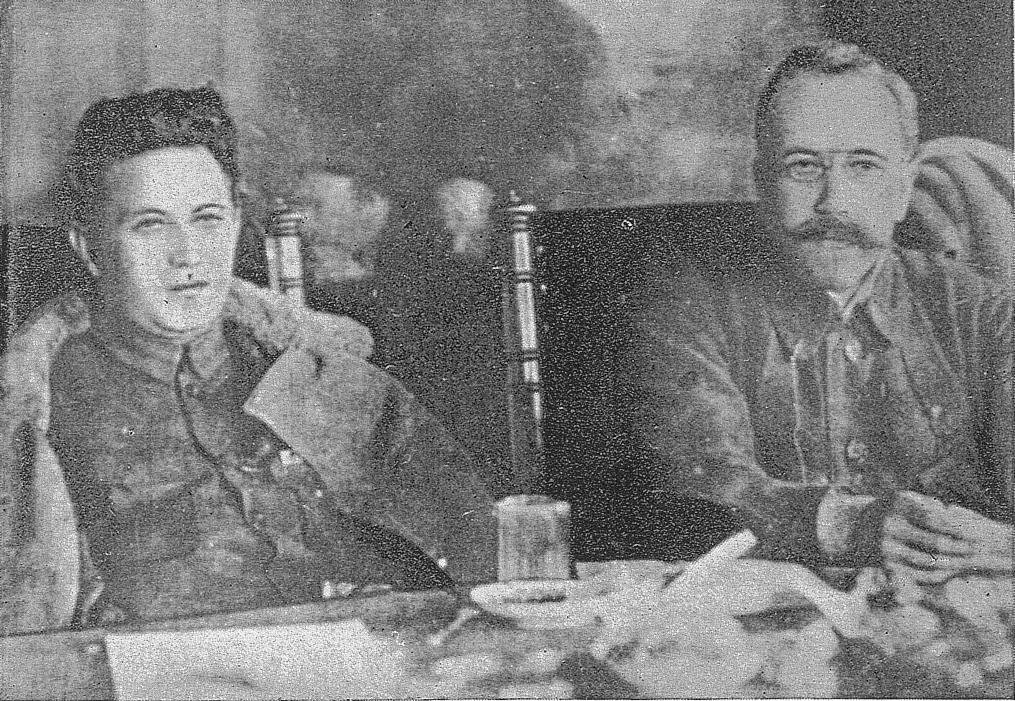
January 16, 1935: Former Soviet leaders Grigory Zinoviev and Lev Kamenev plead guilty to conspiracy to assassinate Sergei Kirov

The following events occurred in January 1935:

== January 1, 1935 (Tuesday) ==
- The Alabama Crimson Tide beat the Stanford Indians 29–13 in the 21st Rose Bowl.
- The first Orange Bowl was held; Bucknell Bison beat the Miami Hurricanes 26–0.
- The first Sugar Bowl was held; the Tulane Green Wave beat the Temple Owls 20–14.
- The Soviet Union abandoned a complicated bread card rationing system after six years and raised wages to keep up with inflation.
- The Associated Press began wirephoto service.
- In an attempt to stimulate trade, Newfoundland lowered most of its import tariffs.

== January 2, 1935 (Wednesday) ==
- The trial of Richard Hauptmann in the Lindbergh kidnapping case began in Flemington, New Jersey with jury selection.
- The Anglo-Irish Trade War softened when Britain agreed to buy more cattle from the Irish Free State in exchange for selling more coal.
- Canadian Prime Minister R.B. Bennett began a series of radio broadcasts outlining what he called a New Deal for Canada. Proposed reforms included a minimum wage, a maximum work week and unemployment insurance.
- The steamer Lexington sank in New York's East River after being rammed by the freighter Jane Christenson. 120 passengers and 51 crew were rescued by tugboats, but 4 people were believed to have perished.
- Born: Lolo Soetoro, stepfather of Barack Obama; in Bandung, West Java, Dutch East Indies (d. 1987)

== January 3, 1935 (Thursday) ==
- On the first proper day of the Lindbergh kidnapping trial, Charles and Anne Morrow Lindbergh gave testimony.
- As the Abyssinia Crisis continued, Ethiopia asked the League of Nations to act in accordance with Article XI of the League Covenant, which stated that "Any war or threat of war, whether immediately affecting any of the Members of the League or not, is hereby declared a matter of concern to the whole League, and the League shall take any action that may be deemed wise and effectual to safeguard the peace of nations." The League, however, postponed action on Ethiopia's request.
- Nazi authorities released an American woman after holding her in prison 11 days for allegedly insulting Hitler.
- Died: Francis Redwood, 95, Roman Catholic Archbishop of Wellington and Metropolitan of New Zealand

== January 4, 1935 (Friday) ==
- U.S. President Franklin D. Roosevelt delivered his second State of the Union address to Congress. Roosevelt pledged to reduce direct Federal relief and begin to replace it with localized programs, and said he would recommend unemployment insurance, social security and other benefits.
- French Foreign Minister Pierre Laval arrived in Rome to hold discussions with Benito Mussolini.
- The Erdek-Marmara Islands earthquake occurred in the Sea of Marmara, Turkey.
- Born: Floyd Patterson, American boxer and world heavyweight champion 1956 to 1959, and 1960 to 1962; in Waco, North Carolina (d. 2006)

== January 5, 1935 (Saturday) ==
- Forty coal miners in Poland ended their 11-day "suicide" hunger strike after local authorities promised to find work for them.
- The Walt Disney-produced animated short film The Tortoise and the Hare was released.
- Died: Clyde Smith, 33, Australian rules footballer and police constable was accidentally shot in the line of duty.

== January 6, 1935 (Sunday) ==
- A train crash on the Moscow to Leningrad line killed 23 people.
- The ocean liner Havana ran aground north of The Bahamas. All aboard were rescued, although one man died of apoplexy in one of the lifeboats.
- Born:
  - Margarita Saxe-Coburg-Gotha, was born in Madrid. She married Simeon Sakskoburggotski, the former King Simeon II of Bulgaria who later served during their marriage as Prime Minister as Margarita Gómez-Acebo y Cejuela .
  - Nino Tempo (stage name for Antonino LoTempio), American singer; in Niagara Falls, New York (d. 2025)

== January 7, 1935 (Monday) ==
- The Franco-Italian Agreement of 1935 was reached, as France and Italy issued an official communique upon the conclusion of the Mussolini-Laval talks. The statement vaguely reported "agreements relating to the interests of the two countries in Africa and documents registering the community of views on European subjects." It was understood that France had agreed to allow Italy a free hand in dealing with Ethiopia in exchange for help containing Hitler.
- The U.S. Supreme Court decided Gregory v. Helvering.
- Born:
  - Valeri Kubasov, Soviet cosmonaut on Soyuz 6 and on Soyuz 19, the 1975 Apollo-Soyuz mission; in Vyazniki, Vladimir Oblast, Russian SFSR, USSR (d. 2014)
  - Kenny Davern, American jazz clarinetist; in Huntington, New York (d. 2006)
  - Ducky Schofield, American baseball player with 19 seasons in Major League Baseball from 1953 to 1971; in Springfield, Illinois (d. 2022)

== January 8, 1935 (Tuesday) ==
- Mao Zedong became a member of the Politburo Standing Committee of the Chinese Communist Party.
- Five were shot in Mexico City when about 1,500 demonstrators stormed the youth headquarters of the Red Shirts, who opened fire in return.
- Born:
  - Elvis Presley, American singer and actor; in Tupelo, Mississippi (d. 1977)
  - Lewis H. Lapham, U.S. writer and publisher; in San Francisco, California (d. 2024)
- Died: Russell Gibson, American bank robber, was shot by FBI agents.

== January 9, 1935 (Wednesday) ==
- The joint U.S.-Canadian commission appointed to arbitrate the controversy surrounding the sinking of the rum-running ship I'm Alone in March 1929 ruled that the United States should apologize for sinking the vessel and pay $25,000 compensation.
- Born:
  - Bob Denver, U.S. actor and comedian known for Gilligan's Island, in New Rochelle, New York (d. 2005)
  - Dick Enberg, U.S. sportscaster; in Mount Clemens, Michigan (d. 2017)
  - John Graham, New Zealand rugby union player and educator; in Stratford (d. 2017)
  - Earl G. Graves Sr., U.S. entrepreneur and publisher; in Brooklyn, New York (d. 2020)
  - Brian Harradine, Australian politician who was the longest-serving independent member of Australia's parliament, serving as Senator for Tasmania from 1975 to 2005; in Quorn, South Australia (d. 2014)

== January 10, 1935 (Thursday) ==
- Mary Pickford won a divorce from Douglas Fairbanks in a Los Angeles court.
- A newspaper in France published the results of a survey asking whom the French would prefer to have as a dictator if their country were to have one. Philippe Pétain received the most votes.
- Born:
  - Ronnie Hawkins, American rockabilly musician; in Huntsville, Arkansas (d. 2022)
  - Sherrill Milnes, American operatic baritone; in Downers Grove, Illinois

== January 11, 1935 (Friday) ==
- A handwriting expert at the Lindbergh kidnapping trial testified that Richard Hauptmann wrote all the ransom notes.
- Died: Marcella Sembrich, 76, Polish coloratura soprano

== January 12, 1935 (Saturday) ==
- Amelia Earhart completed the first solo flight ever made between Hawaii and California, landing in Oakland 18 hours and 16 minutes after takeoff from Wheeler Field.
- Born: The Amazing Kreskin (stage name for George Kresge), American mentalist, TV personality and entertainer; in Montclair, New Jersey (d. 2024)

== January 13, 1935 (Sunday) ==
- A referendum on territorial status was held in the Territory of the Saar Basin. The results would not be known until Tuesday.

== January 14, 1935 (Monday) ==
- The Mosul–Haifa oil pipeline opened in the Near East.
- The Lower Zambezi Railroad Bridge, the longest bridge in Africa at more than 2 miles, opened in Mozambique.
- Born: Lucile Wheeler, Canadian alpine ski racer; in Saint-Jovite, Quebec

== January 15, 1935 (Tuesday) ==
- The plebiscite commission of the League of Nations announced that the Saar had voted overwhelmingly (about 90%) for reunification with Germany. Adolf Hitler gave a radio address on the results of the plebiscite, saying that "Fifteen years of distress, which was a painful period for all Germans, has finally ended. The joy of the return is the joy of the entire nation."
- The Salvadoran presidential election concluded after three days. Maximiliano Hernández Martínez ran unopposed and claimed 100% of the vote.

== January 16, 1935 (Wednesday) ==
- Nineteen people, including Leo Kamenev and Grigory Zinoviev, pleaded guilty in Soviet court to charges of conspiring to assassinate Sergei Kirov.
- President Roosevelt sent a special message to the Senate urging ratification of American adherence to the World Court.
- Born:
  - A. J. Foyt, U.S. racing driver, winner of the Indianapolis 500 in 1961, 1964, 1967 and 1977, 24 Hours of Le Mans in 1967, and the Daytona 500 in 1972; in Houston, Texas
  - Udo Lattek, German footballer and team manager; in Bosemb (d. 2015)
- Died: Kate "Ma" Barker, 61, matriarch of the Barker gang, was killed in a shootout with the FBI in Ocklawaha, Florida, along with her son Fred Barker, 33

== January 17, 1935 (Thursday) ==
- The League of Nations voted to return control of the Saar to Germany, effective March 1.
- Grigory Zinoviev was sentenced to 10 years imprisonment and Leo Kamenev to five. The court ruled that they had no direct connection to the Kirov murder but knew of the terroristic character of the group that carried it out.
- Born: Ruth Ann Minner, U.S. politician and businesswoman, governor of Delaware from 2001 to 2009; in Milford, Delaware (d. 2021)

== January 18, 1935 (Friday) ==
- The French cabinet decided to make Maurice Gamelin the new Commander-in-Chief of the country's armed forces to replace Maxime Weygand, who was about to reach the mandatory retirement age of 68 on Monday.
- The city of Lima, Peru celebrated the 400th anniversary of its founding.
- The film David Copperfield based on the Charles Dickens novel was released.
- Born: Jon Stallworthy, British professor and poet; in London (d. 2014)

== January 19, 1935 (Saturday) ==
- An innovation in underwear, briefs first went on sale at Marshall Field's department store in Chicago.
- Salvador Dalí and his wife Gala left the United States after a very successful two-month visit.
- Born: Soumitra Chatterjee, Indian actor and poet; in Krishnanagar, Bengal Presidency, British India (now West Bengal state) (d. 2020)
- Died: Lloyd Hamilton, 43, American silent film comedian, died during surgery.

== January 20, 1935 (Sunday) ==
- Gangster Alvin Karpis and accomplice Harry Campbell shot their way out of a police trap in Atlantic City, New Jersey. Authorities seemingly had them cornered in their hotel room, but they escaped into an alley, stole a car and managed to evade police in a citywide chase.
- The Norwegian Ice Hockey Association became a member of the International Ice Hockey Federation.

== January 21, 1935 (Monday) ==
- A mine explosion killed 13 coal miners in Gilberton, Pennsylvania.
- Egon Kisch, a Czechoslovak journalist, was convicted in Australian court on a charge of being a prohibited immigrant. He was sentenced to three months hard labour.
- Died: Adolf von Brauchitsch, 58, German army general

== January 22, 1935 (Tuesday) ==
- Pencho Zlatev became the Prime Minister of Bulgaria, but would serve only three months before resigning on April 21.

== January 23, 1935 (Wednesday) ==
- Japanese forces launched a surprise attack from Manchukuo on Chahar Province in China.
- Born: Jerry Tubbs, American football player; in Throckmorton County, Texas (d. 2012)

== January 24, 1935 (Thursday) ==
- Richard Hauptmann took the stand in his own defense in the Lindbergh kidnapping trial.
- The sinking of the cargo liner Mohawk killed 46 of its crew after it was rammed by a Norwegian freighter and sank off Manasquan, New Jersey.
- Beer was sold in cans for the first time. The new containers were marketed in Richmond, Virginia by the Krueger Brewing Company.
- Died: John Barton Payne, 79, American politician, U.S. Secretary of the Interior, 1920 to 1921

== January 25, 1935 (Friday) ==
- The U.S. House of Representatives voted another $11.5 billion to fund the New Deal.
- São Paulo Futebol Clube was founded in Brazil.
- Born: António Ramalho Eanes, President of Portugal 1976 to 1986; in Alcains, Castelo Branco
- Died: Valerian Kuybyshev, 46, Russian revolutionary, Soviet politician and encyclopedia editor, died of heart failure.

== January 26, 1935 (Saturday) ==
- Oscar K. Allen, Governor of Louisiana declared martial law in Baton Rouge as National Guardsmen fired on about 100 armed citizens who were opposed to Huey Long, wounding one person.

== January 27, 1935 (Sunday) ==
- Hermann Göring visited Warsaw for a four-day visit in which he unsuccessfully sought an alliance with Poland against the Soviet Union.
- Police in Mukden, China (then in Japanese occupied "Manchukuo") shot and killed 86 striking workers, and wounded 60 more. Another 500 people were arrested.
- Uruguay beat Argentina 3–0 on the final day of the South American Championship to win the tournament with a perfect 3–0-0 record.

== January 28, 1935 (Monday) ==
- Iceland passed a law legalizing abortion in certain circumstances. This is often cited as the first law of its kind in the world, although other countries like Mexico had previously passed laws allowing for abortion under certain conditions, and Soviet Russia passed a short-lived law permitting it in 1920.
- Died: Mikhail Ippolitov-Ivanov, 75, Russian composer, conductor and teacher

== January 29, 1935 (Tuesday) ==
- The U.S. Senate voted 52–36 against entry into the World Court.
- Born: Roger Payne, U.S. biologist and environmentalist; in South Woodstock, Vermont (d. 2023)

== January 30, 1935 (Wednesday) ==
- Mikhail Tukhachevsky told the All-Union Congress of Soviets that the Red Army was 940,000 strong, a significant jump from 600,000 four years earlier.
- In a proclamation issued on the second anniversary of his coming to power, Adolf Hitler said the Nazis had already fulfilled two-thirds of the programs they had promised to complete in four years.
- The comedic play Three Men on a Horse by George Abbott and John Cecil Holm premiered at the Playhouse Theatre on Broadway.
- Born: Richard Brautigan, U.S. writer; in Tacoma, Washington (d. 1984)

== January 31, 1935 (Thursday) ==
- All 11 people on board a Deruluft airliner, flying from Königsberg to Berlin, crashed in Stettin.
- Buenos Aires, capital of Argentina, had its hottest day in 78 years, 104.5 °F (40.3 °C).
- The romantic comedy film The Good Fairy, starring Margaret Sullavan, premiered in New York City.
- Born: Kenzaburō Ōe, Japanese writer and Nobel Prize in Literature laureate; in Uchiko, Ehime prefecture (d. 2023)
- Died: R. W. Child, 53, American author who served as U.S. Ambassador to Italy 1921 to 1924, and served as the ghostwriter for the autobiography of Benito Mussolini, died of pneumonia.
