= October 1934 =

Month of 1934

<<	October 1934					>>
Su	Mo	Tu	We	Th	Fr	Sa
	1	2	3	4	5	6
7	8	9	10	11	12	13
14	15	16	17	18	19	20
21	22	23	24	25	26	27
28	29	30	31

The following events occurred in October 1934:

== October 1, 1934 (Monday) ==
- The Foreign Press Association in Berlin delivered a message to Joseph Goebbels, asking him to "take the necessary steps in our mutual interests to protect foreign journalists henceforth against slanders and chicane, as we are convinced these happenings are unknown to you." The letter went on to state, "For some time there has been evidence of systematic action against foreign journalists residing here. Foreign journalists of distinction, both women and men, who for years within the limits of their own national possibilities reported on Germany with good will, hear their profession attacked at gatherings to which they have been invited. Moreover, the residences of members were recently searched disgracefully by members of the GSP. The fruitlessness of the searches does not alter the fact that the victims were disillusioned, if not embittered."
- The newspaper comic strip Life's Like That first appeared.
- Born: Chuck Hiller, baseball player, in Johnsburg, Illinois (d. 2004); Shakeb Jalali, poet, in Aligarh, British India (d. 1966)

== October 2, 1934 (Tuesday) ==
- The Royal Indian Navy was formally inaugurated.
- The trial of Samuel Insull and 16 co-defendants for mail fraud began in Chicago federal court.
- Born: Earl Wilson, baseball player, in Ponchatoula, Louisiana (d. 2005)

== October 3, 1934 (Wednesday) ==
- In a big National Hockey League trade, the Montreal Canadiens sent Howie Morenz, Lorne Chabot and Marty Burke to the Stanley Cup-defending Chicago Black Hawks in exchange for Lionel Conacher, Leroy Goldsworthy and Roger Jenkins.
- The musical revue Hi Diddle Diddle opened at London's Savoy Theatre, in which the Cole Porter song "Miss Otis Regrets" was first performed.
- Born: Harold Henning, golfer, in Johannesburg, South Africa (d. 2004)
- Died: Henri Marteau, 60, French violinist and composer

== October 4, 1934 (Thursday) ==
- The Asturian miners' strike began in Spain.
- Alejandro Lerroux became Prime Minister of Spain for the third time.
- Born: Sam Huff, American football player, in Edna Gas, West Virginia (d. 2021)

== October 5, 1934 (Friday) ==
- Spanish leftists launched a general strike in Spain.
- Born: Angelo Buono Jr., American serial killer, in Rochester, New York (d. 2002)
- Died: Jean Vigo, 29, French film director (tuberculosis)

== October 6, 1934 (Saturday) ==
- Lluís Companys declared Catalonia to be an independent state, but Spanish troops swiftly crushed the separatists and arrested him.
- The Marx Brothers signed a new contract with Metro-Goldwyn-Mayer Pictures.

== October 7, 1934 (Sunday) ==
- Right-wing parties made gains in local elections in France.
- Born: Amiri Baraka, writer, in Newark, New Jersey (d. 2014)
- The Droitwich Transmitting Station opened.

== October 8, 1934 (Monday) ==
- A one-day general strike was held in Cuba. The Communist Confederation of Labour in Cuba called it off that night after a day of rioting.

== October 9, 1934 (Tuesday) ==
- A Macedonian revolutionary assassinated King Alexander of Yugoslavia and French Foreign Minister Louis Barthou in Marseille.
- The St. Louis Cardinals won the World Series in seven games with an 11–0 victory over the Detroit Tigers.
- Born: Jill Ker Conway, author, in Hillston, Australia (d. 2018); Abdullah Ibrahim, pianist and composer, in Cape Town, South Africa
- Died: Alexander I of Yugoslavia, 45 (assassinated); Louis Barthou, 72, French politician (assassinated)

== October 10, 1934 (Wednesday) ==
- The 32nd Eucharistic Congress opened in Buenos Aires, Argentina.

== October 11, 1934 (Thursday) ==
- Nazi official August Jäger declared Regional Bishop Hans Meiser to be removed from office for resisting Ludwig Müller's control of the Protestant church. Thousands gathered around Meiser's church in Munich until the bishop came and addressed them. "I do not intend to retreat and I lodge protest here against the force being used against our church and I am unwilling to lay down the episcopal office conferred on me by our church", Meiser declared before proceeding to his house arrest.
- 1,200 coal miners in Pécs, Hungary, went on an underground hunger strike and threatened to commit suicide by shutting off their air supply if their demands for higher wages were not met.

== October 12, 1934 (Friday) ==
- Demonstrators gathered in the courtyard of the episcopal palace in Munich to protest against the removal of Bishop Meiser. The bishop stepped to the balcony but only spoke a few words of gratitude to the crowd before going back inside.
- The musical film The Gay Divorcee starring Fred Astaire and Ginger Rogers was released.
- Died: Willy Clarkson, 72 or 73, English costume designer and wigmaker

== October 13, 1934 (Saturday) ==
- Bavarian Protestants called off meetings and church services to protest against the removal of Bishop Meiser. Pastors supporting Meiser had planned to distribute pamphlets among worshipers on Sunday, but the Gestapo seized the literature before it could be issued for distribution.
- Born: Nana Mouskouri, singer, in Chania, Crete, Greece

== October 14, 1934 (Sunday) ==
- 16,000 pastors of the Protestant church bitterly assailed Ludwig Müller and the Nazi control of the churches. An opposition manifesto distributed to congregations said that Müller and August Jäger were responsible for "the triumph of violence and hypocrisy." The Reverend Martin Niemöller called it "ghastly and shocking how a few persons calling themselves Christian Protestants are persecuting the congregations of Christ."

== October 15, 1934 (Monday) ==
- A half million mourning Yugoslavs crowded Belgrade as the body of King Alexander was returned to the capital by train.
- Died: Raymond Poincaré, 74, French statesman

== October 16, 1934 (Tuesday) ==
- The Long March began in southwest China.
- The Hungarian coal miners ended their hunger strike after five days when the owners made concessions.
- All the ministers of the German cabinet swore oaths of loyalty to Hitler in the chancellery. Chief of the Reich Chancellery Hans Lammers then declared that the Weimar Constitution which Hitler swore to uphold when he became chancellor was canceled.

== October 17, 1934 (Wednesday) ==
- A congressional committee on un-American activities held a hearing in New York on the Friends of New Germany. 300 members of the organization interrupted the proceedings several times with jeers and shouts of "Heil Hitler". A fistfight almost broke out between Jews and Nazi sympathizers when the hearing let out into the hall.
- Born in Muncie, Indiana, on October 13, 1902, Harry Pierpont, 32, was executed in Ohio for killing Sheriff Jess Sarber while he was breaking John Dillinger out of jail in Lima, Ohio.
- Born: Rico Rodriguez, ska and reggae trombonist, in Kingston, Jamaica (d. 2015)
- Died: Santiago Ramón y Cajal, 82, Spanish histologist, neuroscientist and Nobel laureate

== October 18, 1934 (Thursday) ==
- Following the requiem mass for Alexander of Yugoslavia in Belgrade the body was taken to his native village of Topola and buried next to his mother Zorka in the family mausoleum in Oplenac Church.
- Born: Chuck Swindoll, evangelist, in El Campo, Texas

== October 19, 1934 (Friday) ==
- The Little Entente and Balkan Entente issued identically-worded messages expressing solidarity with Yugoslavia and laying responsibility for the assassination of King Alexander upon terrorists urged on by the foreign policies of nations that were not named but were clearly indicated to be Hungary and Italy.
- Died: Alexander von Kluck, 88, German general

== October 20, 1934 (Saturday) ==
- The MacRobertson Air Race began as twenty airplanes took off at dawn from RAF Mildenhall in Suffolk. The finish line was Melbourne, Australia, 11,323 miles (18,223 km) away.
- Born: Michael Dunn, actor and singer, in Shattuck, Oklahoma (d. 1973); Eddie Harris, jazz saxophonist, in Chicago, Illinois (d. 1996); Charles Liebman, political scientist and author, in New York City (d. 2003)

== October 21, 1934 (Sunday) ==
- 5 were killed and 10,000 left homeless by a typhoon that struck the Camarines Sur province of the Philippines.
- Born: Brian Kilrea, ice hockey player, coach and manager, in Ottawa, Ontario, Canada

== October 22, 1934 (Monday) ==
- The notorious bank robber and gangster Charles "Pretty Boy" Floyd was killed by FBI agents in a cornfield near East Liverpool, Ohio.
- Died: Pretty Boy Floyd, 30, American bank robber (died of wounds sustained in shootout with law enforcement)

== October 23, 1934 (Tuesday) ==
- Mahatma Gandhi resigned as leader of the Indian National Congress.
- Francesco Agello flew a Macchi M.C.72 seaplane 440.69 miles per hour (709.22 km/h), a record for piston-engine planes that has never been broken.
- C. W. A. Scott and Tom Campbell Black won the MacRobertson Air Race in 2 days, 22 hours and 25 minutes flying a de Havilland DH.88.
- Jeannette Piccard became the first woman to reach the stratosphere when she rode in a high-altitude balloon with her husband Jean.
- Born: Aryeh Kaplan, rabbi and author, in the Bronx, New York (d. 1983)

== October 24, 1934 (Wednesday) ==
- The earliest known recording of "Santa Claus is Coming to Town" was made by banjoist Harry Reser and his band featuring Tom Stacks on vocals.
- Born: Wally Herbert, polar explorer, writer and artist, in York, England (d. 2007)

== October 25, 1934 (Thursday) ==
- Western Washington state was menaced by flood waters.
- Born: Earl Ingarfield, Sr., ice hockey player, in Lethbridge, Alberta, Canada

== October 26, 1934 (Friday) ==
- August Jäger resigned as Nazi commissioner for Protestant churches in Prussia.
- Born: Roy Ascott, academic and artist, in Bath, Somerset, England; Jacques Loussier, pianist and composer, in Angers, France (d. 2019); Hans-Joachim Roedelius, experimental musician, in Berlin, Germany

== October 27, 1934 (Saturday) ==
- King Prajadhipok of Siam announced his intention to abdicate the throne.

== October 28, 1934 (Sunday) ==
- Film actor Rex Lease threw a punch at Jack Oakie in a Santa Monica Boulevard cafe. Oakie denied afterwards that there "had really been a fight", saying, "I was kidding Lease. Guess he didn't feel very well and couldn't take it. You can bet your life, baby, nobody clipped Jackie on the chin."
- A legislative election was held in Honduras, won by the National Party.

== October 29, 1934 (Monday) ==
- The Berne Trial opened in Switzerland. Jewish groups had lodged a civil complaint against Swiss Nazis for distributing a plagiarized version of the fraudulent anti-Semitic treatise The Protocols of the Elders of Zion in a party organ, despite a Swiss law prohibiting literature "calculated to excite vile instincts or to cause brutal offense."
- Died: Robert C. Pruyn, 87, American inventor, businessman and politician; Lou Tellegen, 52, Dutch-born actor, director and screenwriter (suicide)

== October 30, 1934 (Tuesday) ==
- The play The Farmer Takes a Wife by Frank B. Elser and Marc Connelly opened at the 46th Street Theatre on Broadway.
- Born: Frans Brüggen, conductor, recorder player and flautist, in Amsterdam, Netherlands (d. 2014); Hamilton Camp, singer-songwriter and actor, in London, England (d. 2005)

== October 31, 1934 (Wednesday) ==
- The German People's Court announced that "several persons were tried for high treason and sentenced to death recently", but did not reveal any names.
- The re-opened Century of Progress exhibition in Chicago closed.
