= List of UEFA club competition winning managers =

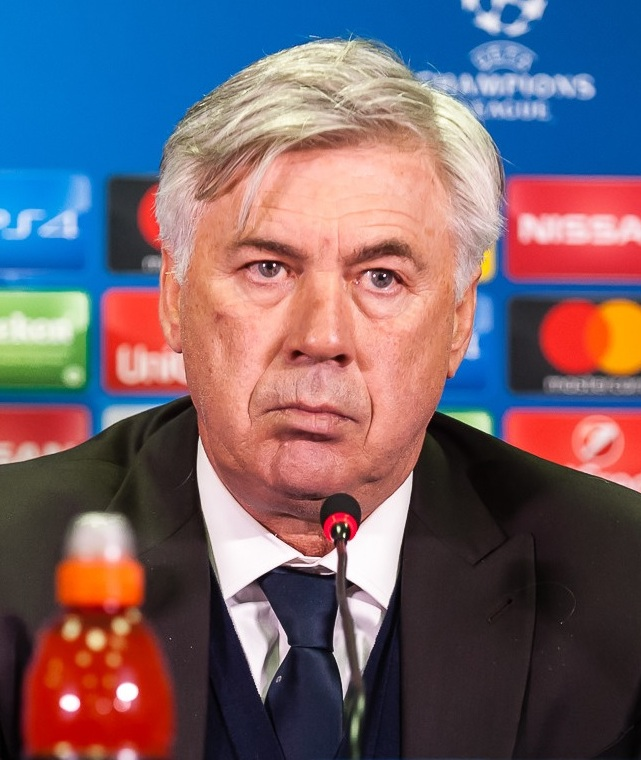
Carlo Ancelotti became the first manager to win 11 UEFA competition titles.

This is a list of UEFA club competition winning football managers. It includes victories in the European Cup and UEFA Champions League, the UEFA Cup Winners' Cup, the UEFA Cup and Europa League, the UEFA Conference League, the UEFA Intertoto Cup, the UEFA Super Cup and the Intercontinental Cup.

Italian Carlo Ancelotti is the most successful manager, claiming 11 titles. Italian managers have won more tournaments than any other nationality, having secured 54 titles, while Spanish managers are in second place with 51 competition victories.

Although no manager has ever won all of these competitions, Giovanni Trapattoni is the only manager to have claimed the title of five different confederation tournaments. Trapattoni and German Udo Lattek are the only managers to have won at least once the three seasonal pre-1999 UEFA competitions: the European Cup, the Cup Winners' Cup and the UEFA Cup. Portuguese José Mourinho is the first manager to win at least once the three current seasonal UEFA competitions: the UEFA Champions League, the UEFA Cup or Europa League, and the UEFA Europa Conference League or Conference League. Zinedine Zidane is the only manager to win three UEFA Champions League tournaments in a row, winning with Real Madrid in the 2015–16, 2016–17, and 2017–18 seasons.

While the Inter-Cities Fairs Cup is considered to be the predecessor to the UEFA Cup, the Union of European Football Associations (UEFA) does not recognise it officially, and therefore successes in this competition are not included in this list. Also excluded are the unofficial 1972 European Super Cup, and the Club World Cup, a FIFA competition.

Starting the 2021–22 football season, UEFA commenced the UEFA Conference League (then named the UEFA Europa Conference League) which is a third seasonal competition organized by UEFA. For this reason, a manager can now win three main UEFA club competitions which was previously not possible since the UEFA Cup Winners' Cup was last competed in 1999.

== Winning managers ==
The following lists have been last updated on 12 August 2026, after the 2026 UEFA Super Cup.

=== By number of titles ===
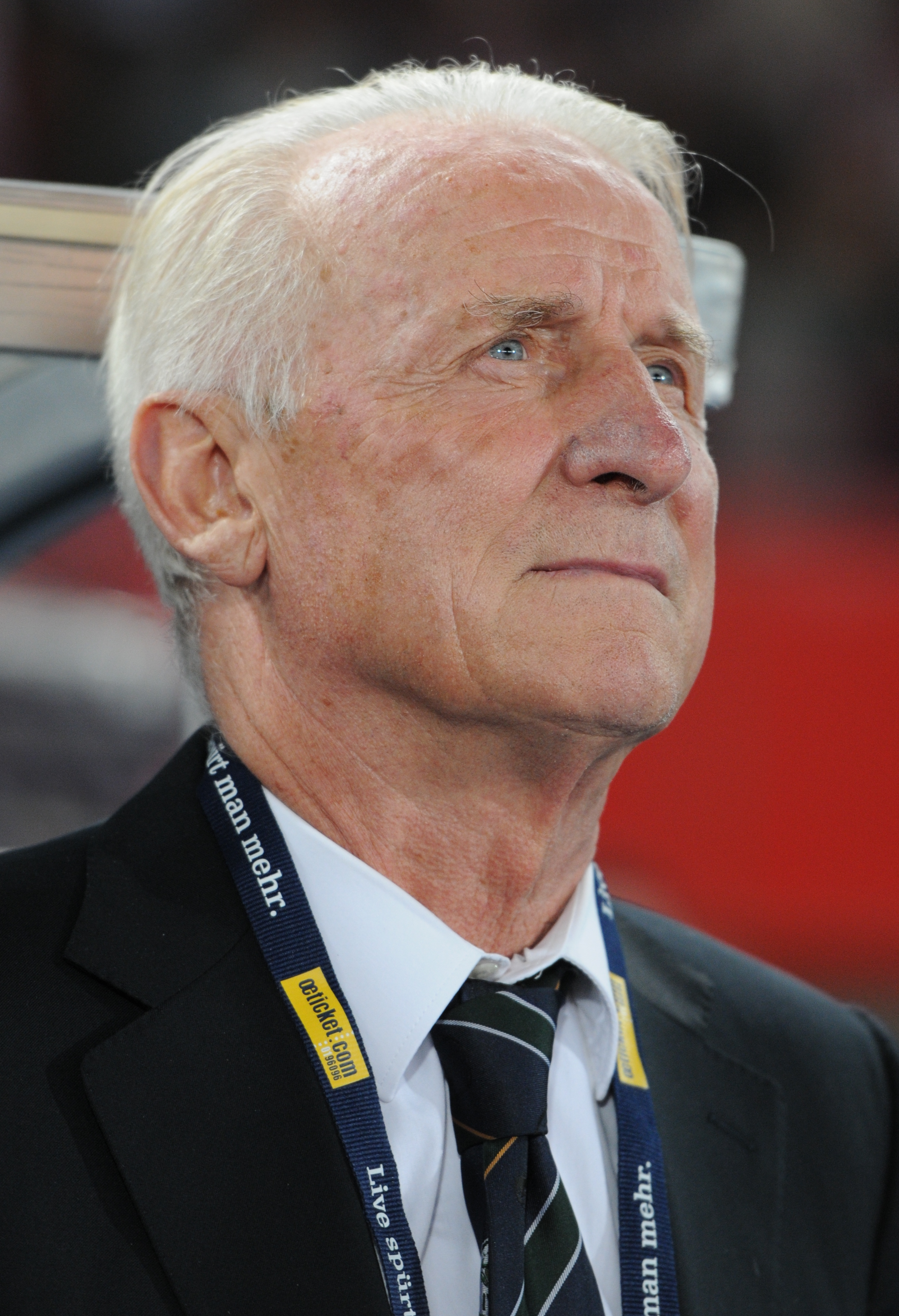
Giovanni Trapattoni has won a total of seven UEFA competition titles. He was the first to have won five out of five confederation tournaments and is the only one alongside Udo Lattek and José Mourinho to have won the three seasonal European competitions.

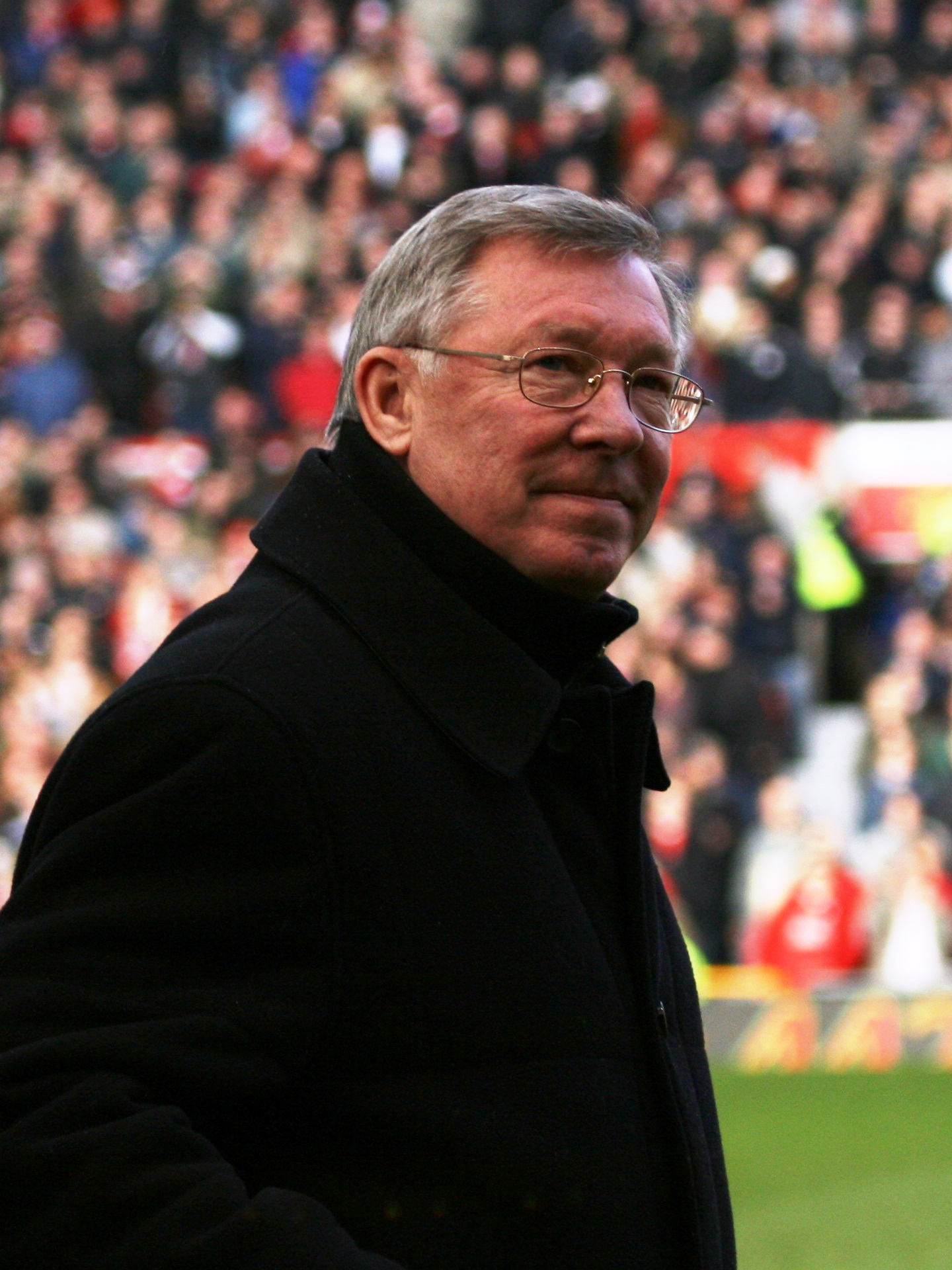
Alex Ferguson, winner of seven UEFA tournaments.

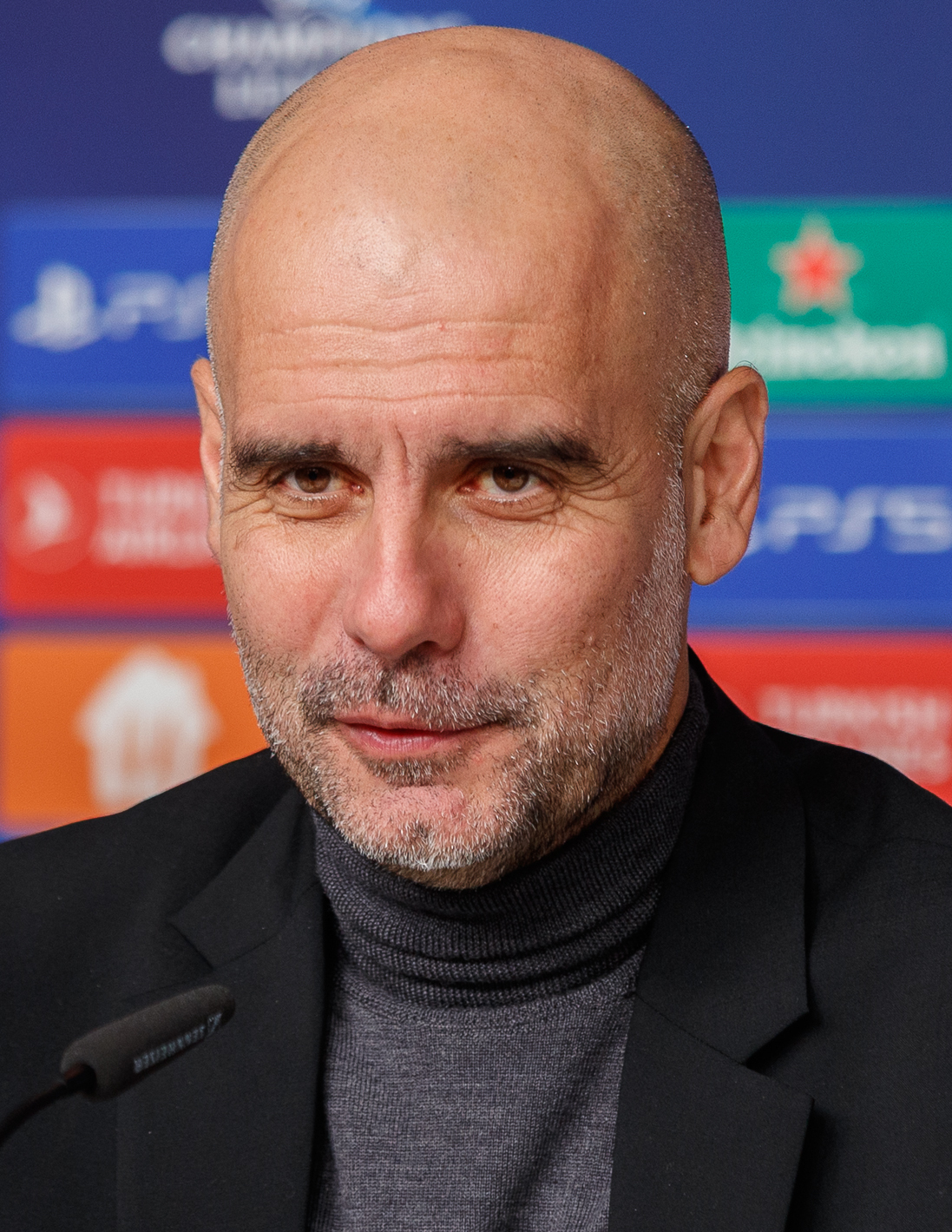
Pep Guardiola, winner of seven UEFA tournaments.

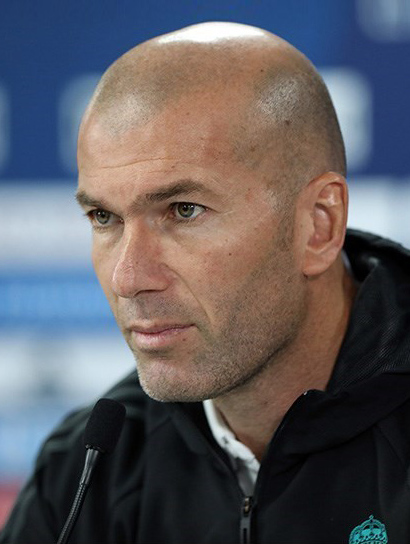
Zinedine Zidane, winner of five UEFA tournaments.

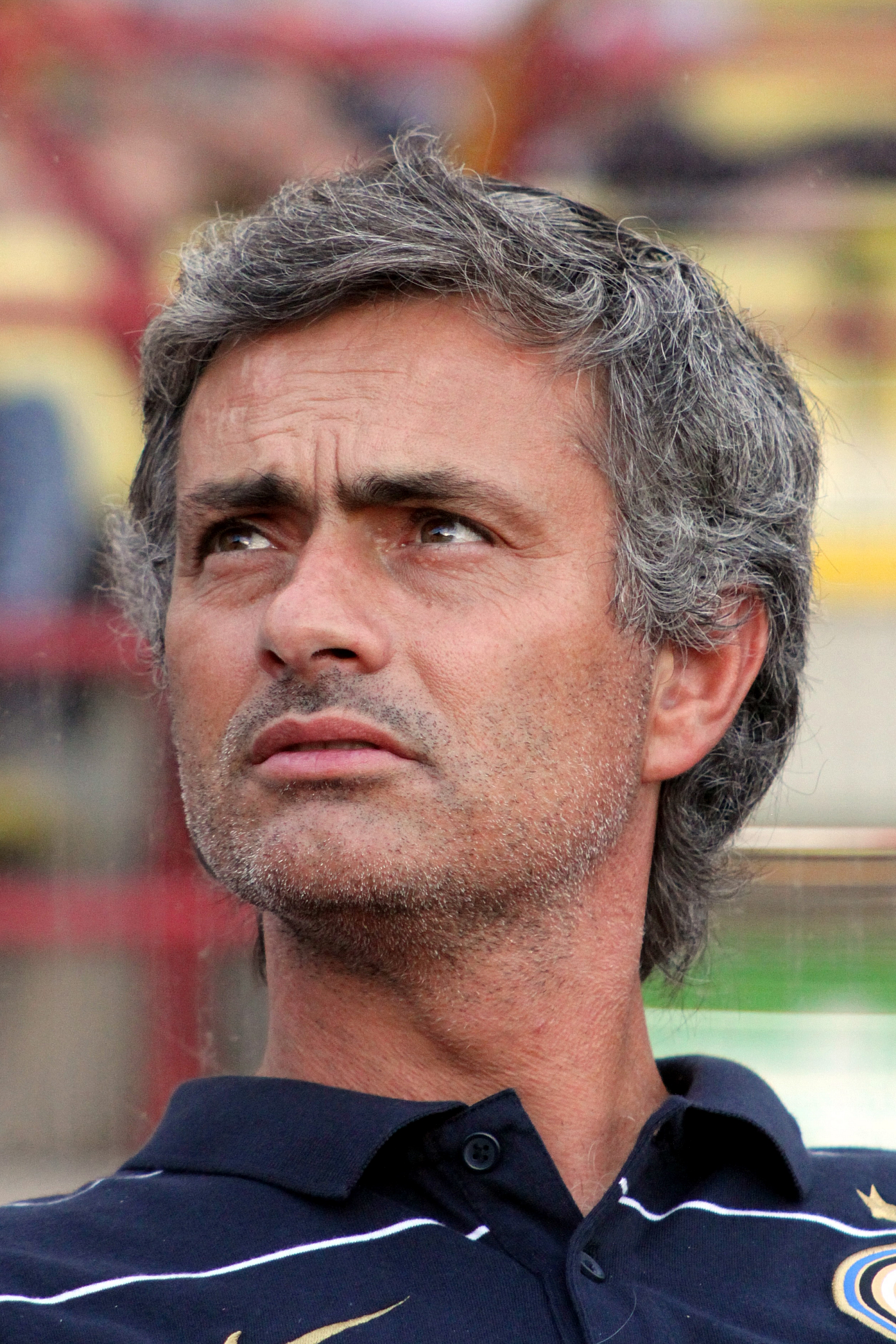
José Mourinho has claimed five UEFA club tournament victories, and the first to have won the UEFA Europa Conference League.

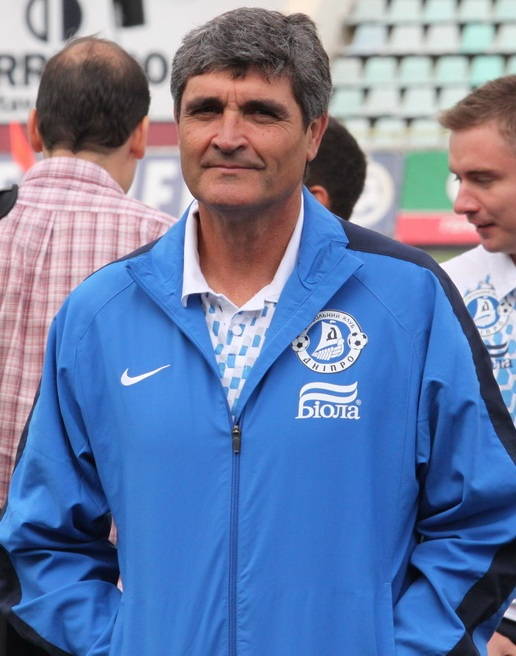
Juande Ramos has won three UEFA titles, including two successful UEFA Cup campaigns.

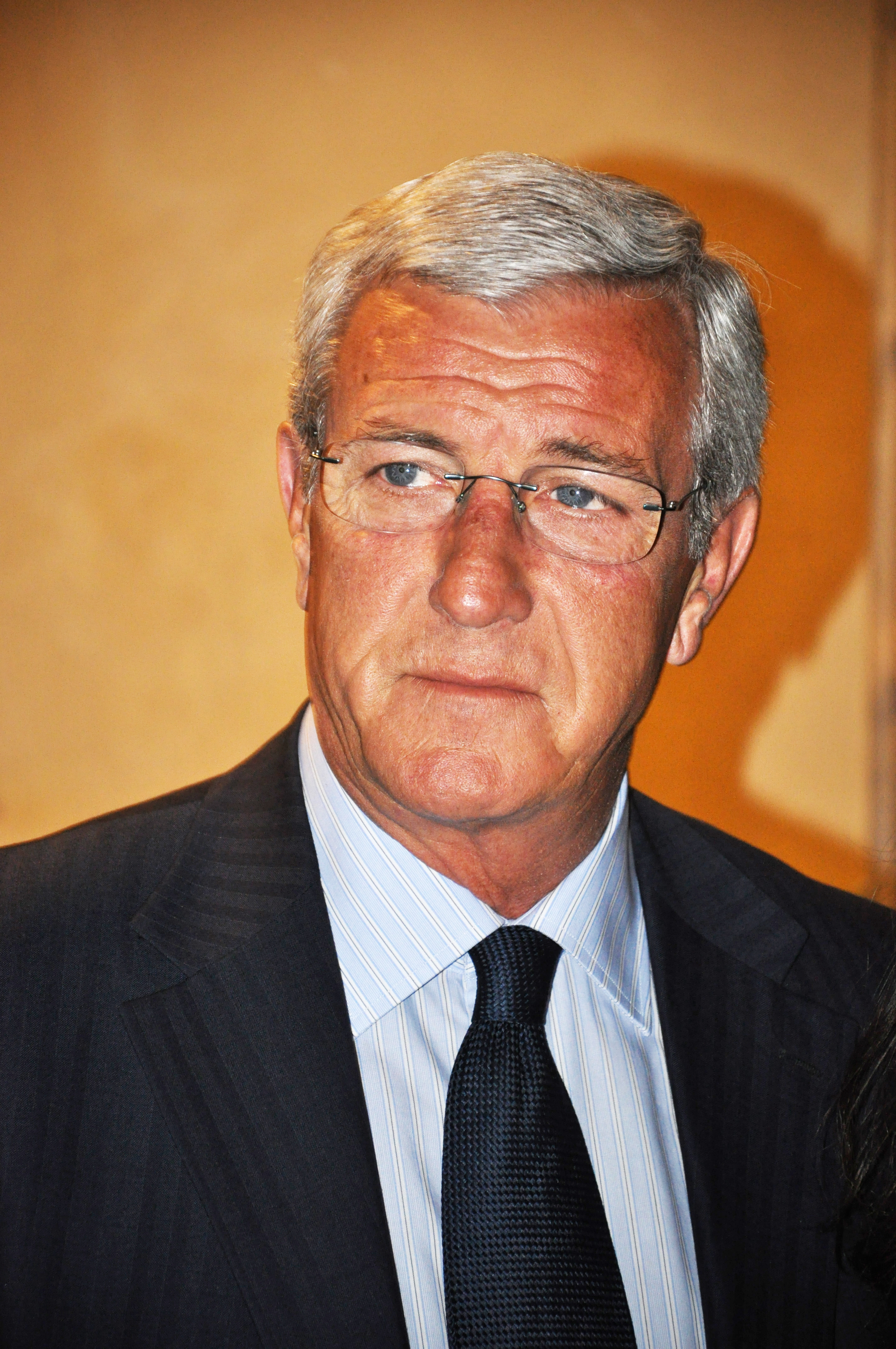
Marcello Lippi has won the UEFA Champions League, the UEFA Super Cup and the Intercontinental Cup.

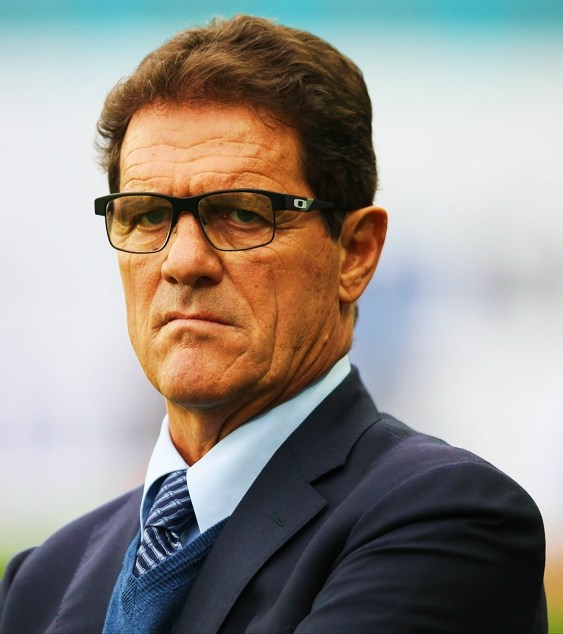
Fabio Capello, winner of two UEFA club titles.

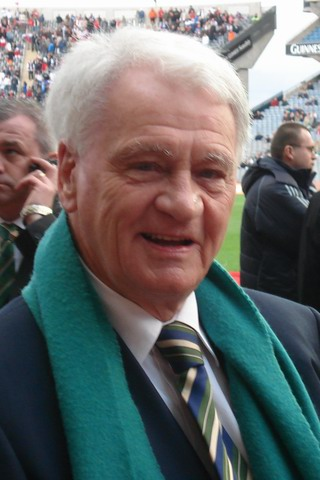
Bobby Robson won the UEFA Cup in 1981 and the Cup Winners' Cup in 1997.

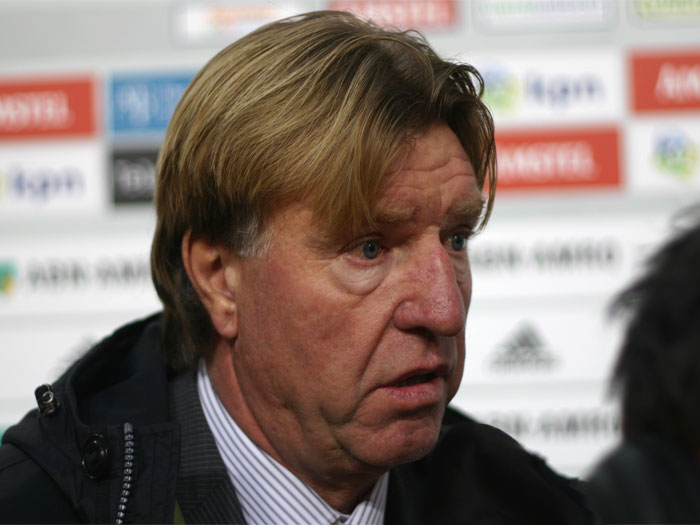
Aad de Mos won both the Cup Winners' Cup and the Super Cup with Mechelen.

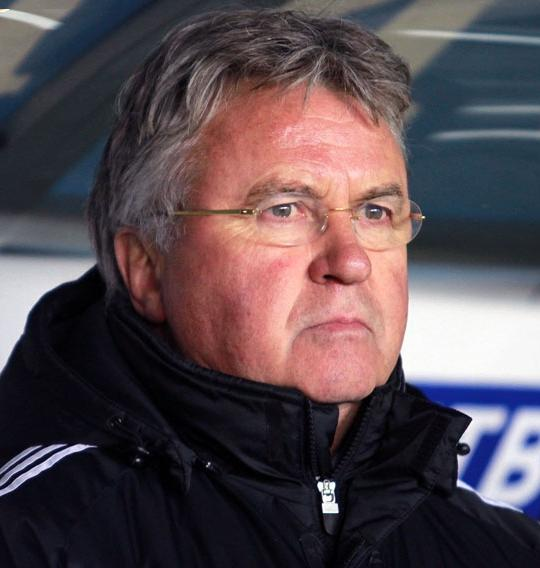
Guus Hiddink won the European Cup with PSV Eindhoven in 1988 and the Intercontinental Cup with Real Madrid in 1998.

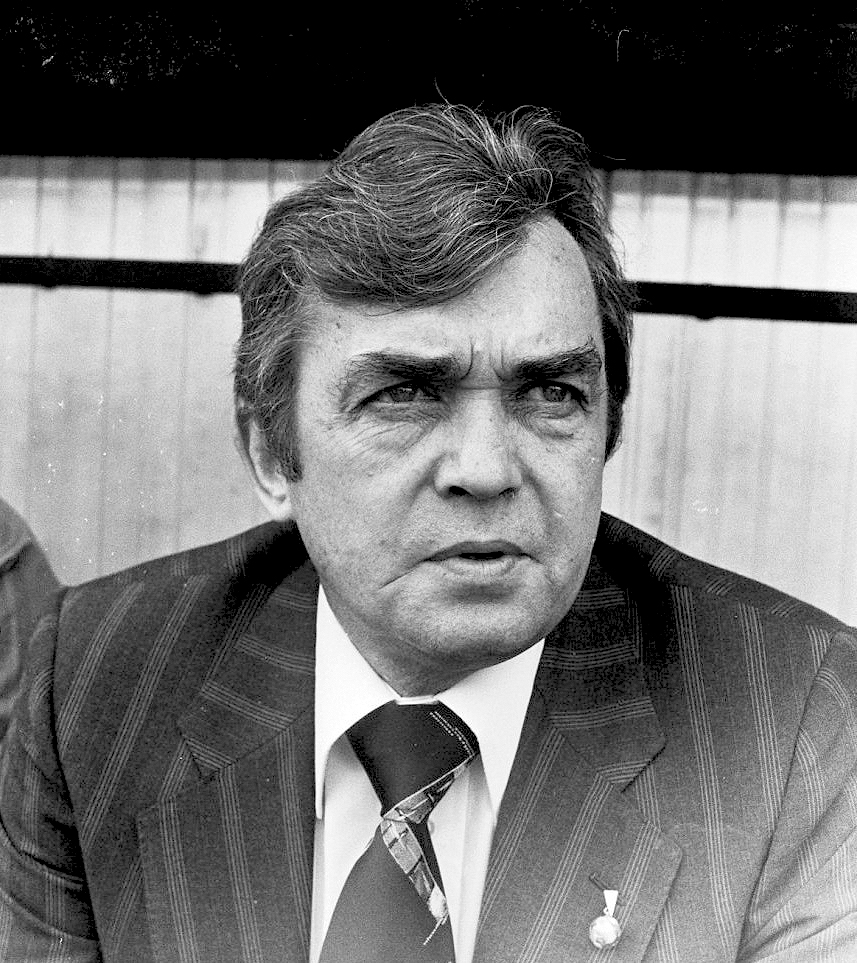
Ernst Happel was the only Austrian manager to have won the European Cup twice.

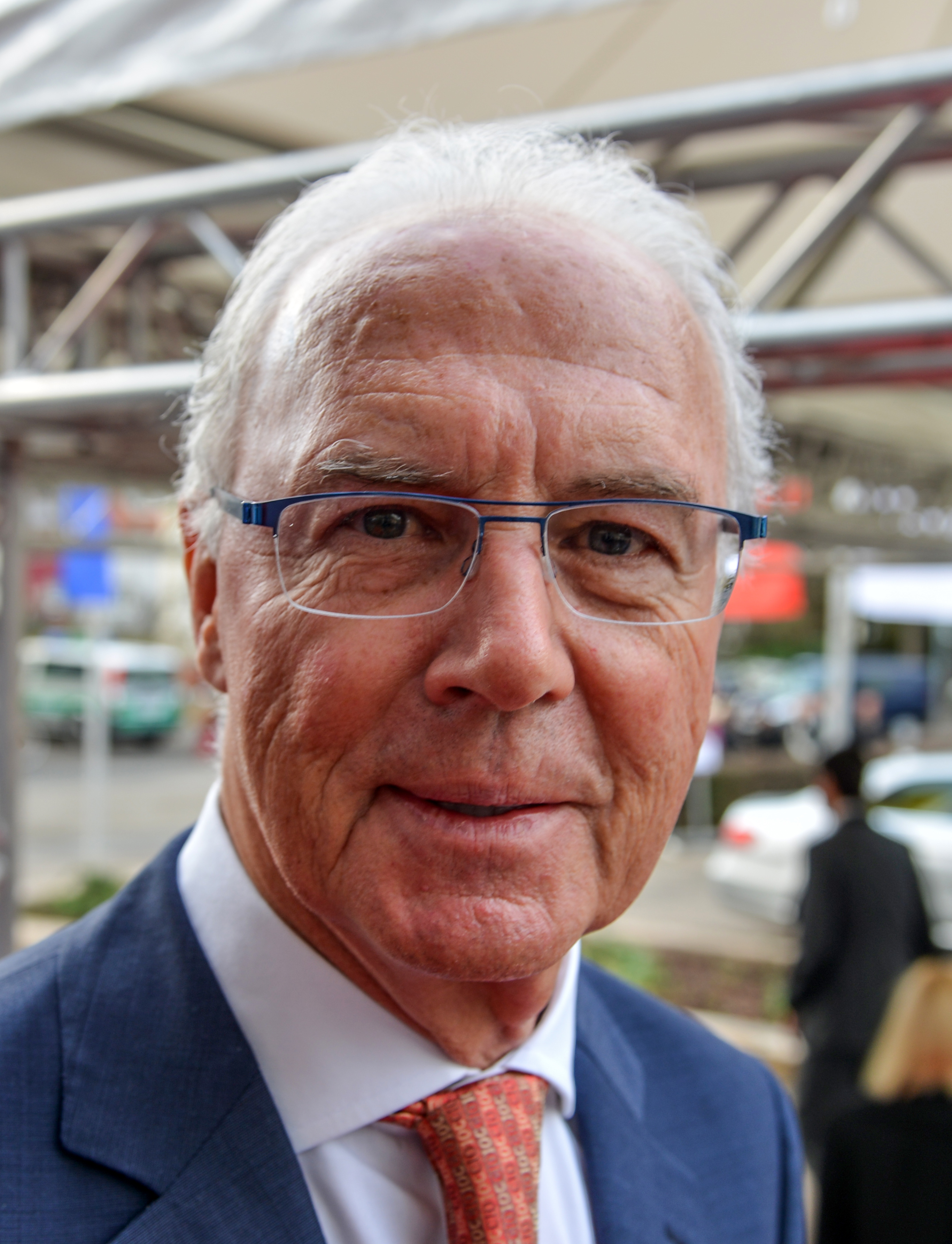
Franz Beckenbauer won the UEFA Cup in 1996.

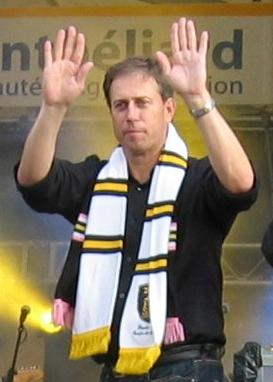
Alain Perrin won the Intertoto Cup in 2001.

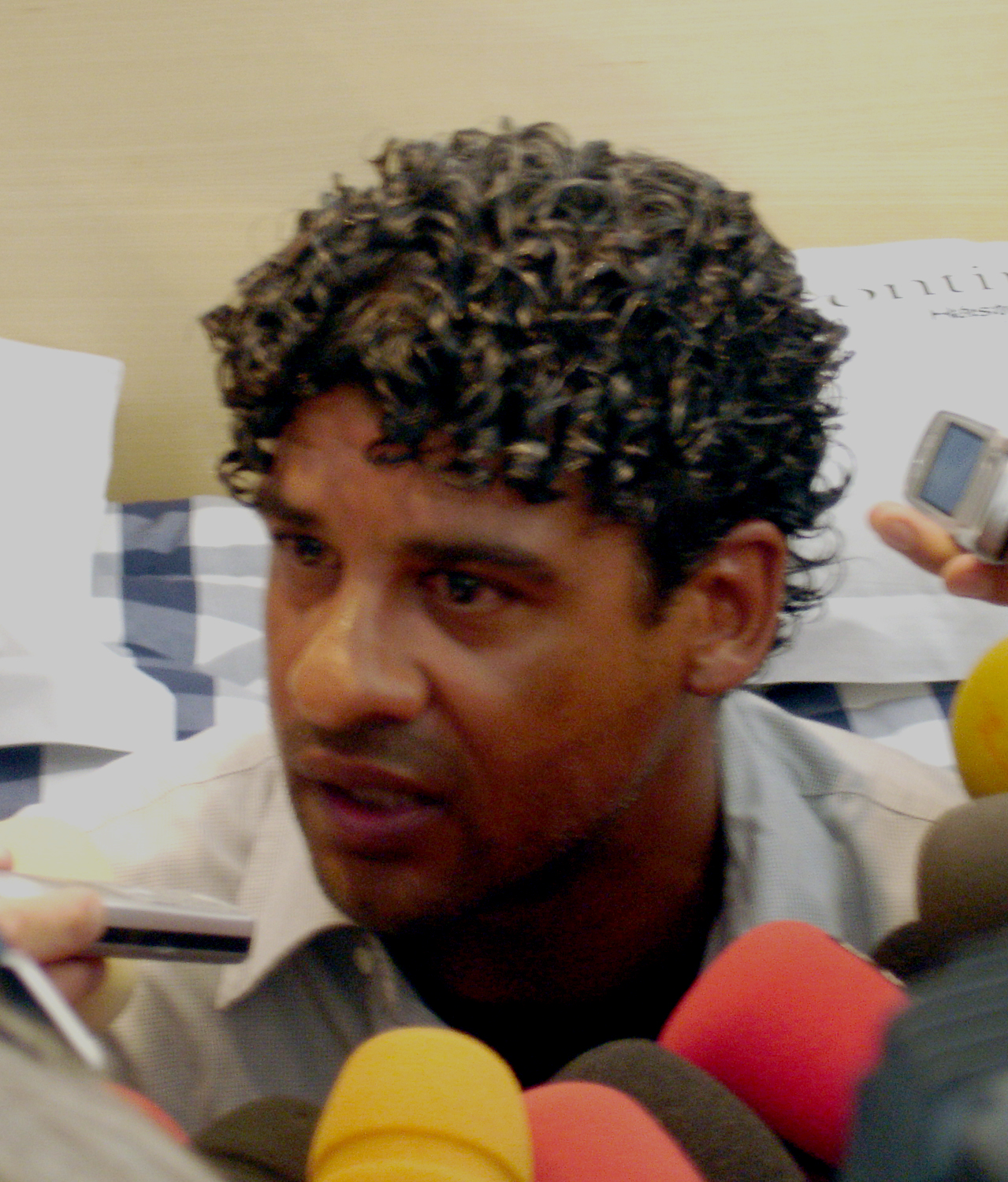
Frank Rijkaard won the UEFA Champions League in 2006.

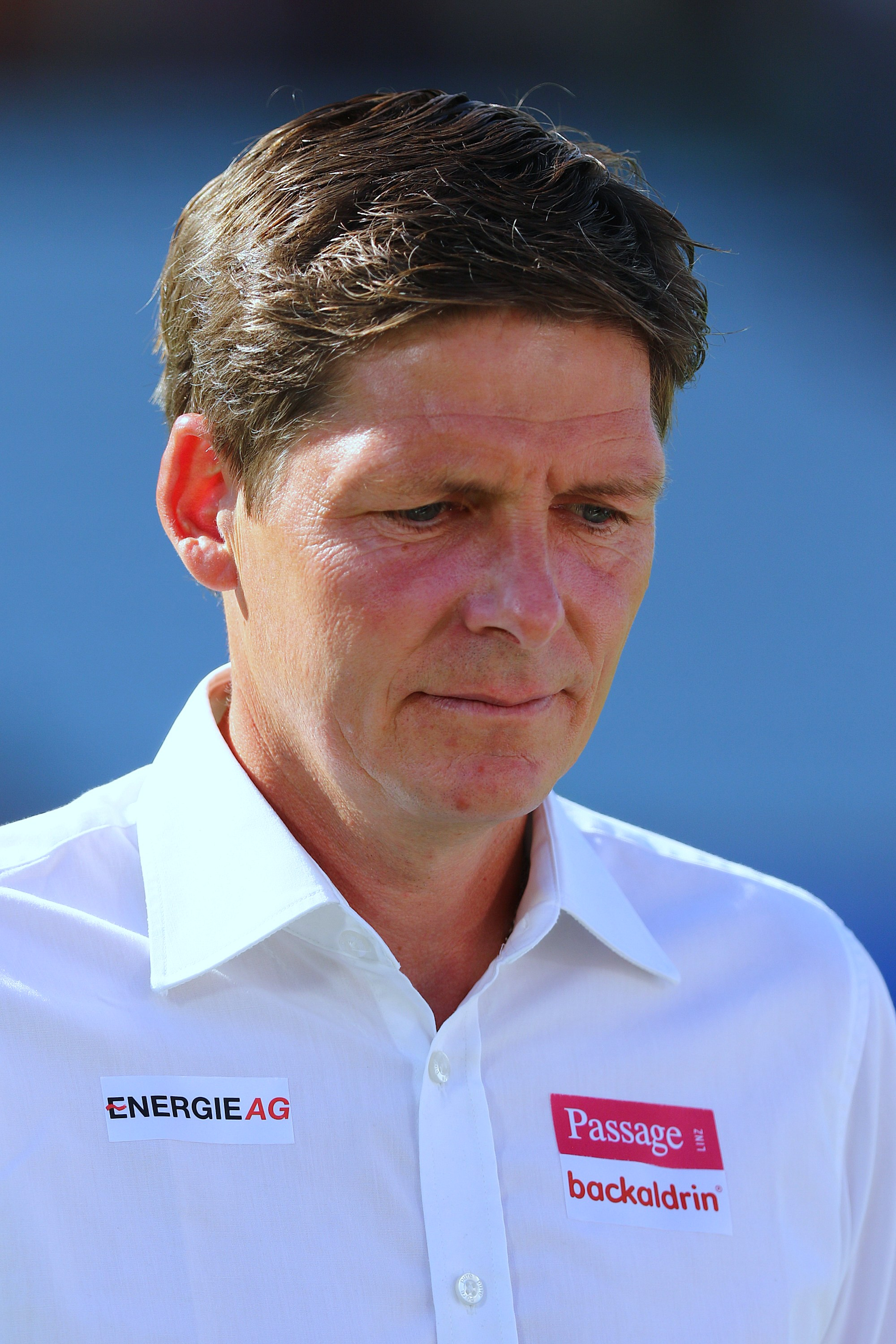
Oliver Glasner won the UEFA Europa League in 2022 and the UEFA Conference League in 2026.

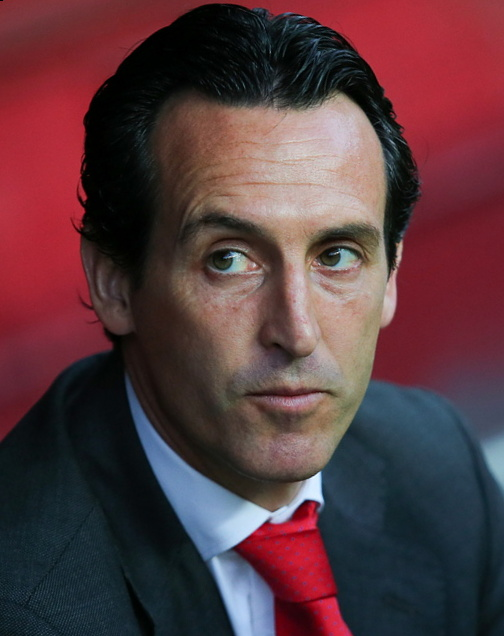
Unai Emery won a record five UEFA Europa League titles.

Key

CL	European Cup / UEFA Champions League
CWC	UEFA Cup Winners' Cup (defunct)
EL	UEFA Cup / UEFA Europa League
UECL	UEFA Europa Conference League / UEFA Conference League
UIC	UEFA Intertoto Cup (defunct)
SC	UEFA Super Cup
IC	Intercontinental Cup (defunct)

Nat.	Manager	CL	CWC	EL	UECL	UIC	SC	IC	Total
(Italy)	Carlo Ancelotti	5	–	–	–	1	5	–	11
(Spain)	Pep Guardiola	3	–	–	–	–	4	–	7
(Scotland)	Alex Ferguson	2	2	–	–	–	2	1	7
(Spain)	Luis Enrique	3	–	–	–	–	3	–	6
(Italy)	Arrigo Sacchi	2	–	–	–	–	2	2	6
(Italy)	Giovanni Trapattoni	1	1	3	–	–	1	1	7
(England)	Bob Paisley	3	–	1	–	–	1	–	5
(France)	Zinedine Zidane	3	–	–	–	–	2	–	5
(Italy)	Nereo Rocco	2	2	–	–	–	–	1	5
(Portugal)	José Mourinho	2	–	2	1	–	–	–	5
(Netherlands)	Louis van Gaal	1	–	1	–	–	2	1	5
(Spain)	Unai Emery	–	–	5	–	–	–	–	5
(Germany)	Jupp Heynckes	2	–	–	–	2	–	–	4
(Spain)	Vicente del Bosque	2	–	–	–	–	1	1	4
(Argentina)	Helenio Herrera	2	–	–	–	–	–	2	4
(Netherlands)	Johan Cruyff	1	2	–	–	–	1	–	4
(Belgium)	Raymond Goethals	1	1	–	–	–	2	–	4
(Spain)	Rafael Benítez	1	–	2	–	–	1	–	4
(Italy)	Nevio Scala	–	1	1	–	–	1	1	4
(Argentina)	Diego Simeone	–	–	2	–	–	2	–	4
(Spain)	José Villalonga	2	1	–	–	–	–	–	3
(England)	Brian Clough	2	–	–	–	–	1	–	3
(Germany)	Ottmar Hitzfeld	2	–	–	–	–	–	1	3
(Romania)	Ștefan Kovács	2	–	–	–	–	–	1	3
(Germany)	Dettmar Cramer	2	–	–	–	–	–	1	3
(Austria)	Ernst Happel	2	–	–	–	–	–	1	3
(Spain)	Miguel Muñoz	2	–	–	–	–	–	1	3
(Germany)	Udo Lattek	1	1	1	–	–	–	–	3
(Italy)	Marcello Lippi	1	–	–	–	–	1	1	3
(Soviet Union)	Valeriy Lobanovskyi	–	2	–	–	–	1	–	3
(Sweden)	Sven-Göran Eriksson	–	1	1	–	–	1	–	3
(Spain)	Víctor Fernández	–	1	–	–	1	–	1	3
(Spain)	Juande Ramos	–	–	2	–	–	1	–	3
(Argentina)	Luis Carniglia	2	–	–	–	–	–	–	2
(Hungary)	Béla Guttmann	2	–	–	–	–	–	–	2
(England)	Tony Barton	1	–	–	–	–	1	–	2
(Italy)	Fabio Capello	1	–	–	–	–	1	–	2
(Germany)	Jürgen Klopp	1	–	–	–	–	1	–	2
(Germany)	Hansi Flick	1	–	–	–	–	1	–	2
(Germany)	Thomas Tuchel	1	–	–	–	–	1	–	2
(Netherlands)	Guus Hiddink	1	–	–	–	–	–	1	2
(England)	Bill Nicholson	–	1	1	–	–	–	–	2
(England)	Bobby Robson	–	1	1	–	–	–	–	2
(France)	Luis Fernandez	–	1	–	–	1	–	–	2
(Italy)	Gianluca Vialli	–	1	–	–	–	1	–	2
(Netherlands)	Aad de Mos	–	1	–	–	–	1	–	2
(Spain)	Luis Molowny	–	–	2	–	–	–	–	2
(Austria)	Oliver Glasner	–	–	1	1	–	–	–	2
(Spain)	José Luis Mendilibar	–	–	1	1	–	–	–	2
(Netherlands)	Huub Stevens	–	–	1	–	1	–	–	2
(Romania)	Mircea Lucescu	–	–	1	–	–	1	–	2
(Netherlands)	Dick Advocaat	–	–	1	–	–	1	–	2
(France)	Gérard Houllier	–	–	1	–	–	1	–	2
(Spain)	Quique Sánchez Flores	–	–	1	–	–	1	–	2
(Italy)	Claudio Ranieri	–	–	–	–	1	1	–	2
(Socialist Federal Republic of Yugoslavia)	Tomislav Ivić	–	–	–	–	–	1	1	2
(England)	Joe Fagan	1	–	–	–	–	–	–	1
(Scotland)	Jock Stein	1	–	–	–	–	–	–	1
(Netherlands)	Rinus Michels	1	–	–	–	–	–	–	1
(Netherlands)	Frank Rijkaard	1	–	–	–	–	–	–	1
(Scotland)	Matt Busby	1	–	–	–	–	–	–	1
(Socialist Federal Republic of Yugoslavia)	Ljupko Petrović	1	–	–	–	–	–	–	1
(Romania)	Emerich Jenei	1	–	–	–	–	–	–	1
(Portugal)	Artur Jorge	1	–	–	–	–	–	–	1
(Italy)	Roberto Di Matteo	1	–	–	–	–	–	–	1
(Socialist Federal Republic of Yugoslavia)	Vujadin Boškov	–	1	–	–	–	–	–	1
(Hungary)	Nándor Hidegkuti	–	1	–	–	–	–	–	1
(England)	Ron Greenwood	–	1	–	–	–	–	–	1
(Spain)	Joaquim Rifé	–	1	–	–	–	–	–	1
(Spain)	Alfredo Di Stéfano	–	1	–	–	–	–	–	1
(Germany)	Otto Rehhagel	–	1	–	–	–	–	–	1
(Scotland)	George Graham	–	1	–	–	–	–	–	1
(Portugal)	Anselmo Fernandez	–	1	–	–	–	–	–	1
(Germany)	Willi Multhaup	–	1	–	–	–	–	–	1
(Socialist Federal Republic of Yugoslavia)	Zlatko Čajkovski	–	1	–	–	–	–	–	1
(Czechoslovakia)	Michal Vičan	–	1	–	–	–	–	–	1
(England)	Joe Mercer	–	1	–	–	–	–	–	1
(England)	Dave Sexton	–	1	–	–	–	–	–	1
(Scotland)	William Waddell	–	1	–	–	–	–	–	1
(Germany)	Heinz Krügel	–	1	–	–	–	–	–	1
(Netherlands)	Hans Croon	–	1	–	–	–	–	–	1
(Germany)	Kuno Klötzer	–	1	–	–	–	–	–	1
(Soviet Union)	Nodar Akhalkatsi	–	1	–	–	–	–	–	1
(England)	Howard Kendall	–	1	–	–	–	–	–	1
(Scotland)	Bill Shankly	–	–	1	–	–	–	–	1
(Italy)	Ottavio Bianchi	–	–	1	–	–	–	–	1
(Netherlands)	Wiel Coerver	–	–	1	–	–	–	–	1
(Belgium)	Paul Van Himst	–	–	1	–	–	–	–	1
(Netherlands)	Bert van Marwijk	–	–	1	–	–	–	–	1
(Russia)	Valery Gazzaev	–	–	1	–	–	–	–	1
(Germany)	Hennes Weisweiler	–	–	1	–	–	–	–	1
(Germany)	Friedel Rausch	–	–	1	–	–	–	–	1
(England)	Keith Burkinshaw	–	–	1	–	–	–	–	1
(Sweden)	Gunder Bengtsson	–	–	1	–	–	–	–	1
(Turkey)	Fatih Terim	–	–	1	–	–	–	–	1
(Germany)	Erich Ribbeck	–	–	1	–	–	–	–	1
(Italy)	Dino Zoff	–	–	1	–	–	–	–	1
(Italy)	Giampiero Marini	–	–	1	–	–	–	–	1
(Germany)	Franz Beckenbauer	–	–	1	–	–	–	–	1
(Italy)	Luigi Simoni	–	–	1	–	–	–	–	1
(Italy)	Alberto Malesani	–	–	1	–	–	–	–	1
(Portugal)	André Villas-Boas	–	–	1	–	–	–	–	1
(Netherlands)	Kees Rijvers	–	–	1	–	–	–	–	1
(Italy)	Maurizio Sarri	–	–	1	–	–	–	–	1
(Spain)	Julen Lopetegui	–	–	1	–	–	–	–	1
(Italy)	Gian Piero Gasperini	–	–	1	–	–	–	–	1
(Australia)	Ange Postecoglou	–	–	1	–	–	–	–	1
(Scotland)	David Moyes	–	–	—	1	–	–	–	1
(Italy)	Enzo Maresca	–	–	—	1	–	–	–	1
(France)	Frédéric Antonetti	–	–	–	–	1	–	–	1
(Italy)	Serse Cosmi	–	–	–	–	1	–	–	1
(Italy)	Luigi De Canio	–	–	–	–	1	–	–	1
(Germany)	Thomas Doll	–	–	–	–	1	–	–	1
(France)	Jacky Duguépéroux	–	–	–	–	1	–	–	1
(Denmark)	Preben Elkjær	–	–	–	–	1	–	–	1
(France)	Jean Fernandez	–	–	–	–	1	–	–	1
(Spain)	Benito Floro	–	–	–	–	1	–	–	1
(France)	Jean-Louis Gasset	–	–	–	–	1	–	–	1
(France)	Francis Gillot	–	–	–	–	1	–	–	1
(England)	John Gregory	–	–	–	–	1	–	–	1
(France)	Bernard Lacombe	–	–	–	–	1	–	–	1
(Germany)	Felix Magath	–	–	–	–	1	–	–	1
(Italy)	Carlo Mazzone	–	–	–	–	1	–	–	1
(Socialist Federal Republic of Yugoslavia)	Slavoljub Muslin	–	–	–	–	1	–	–	1
(Spain)	Joaquín Peiró	–	–	–	–	1	–	–	1
(Chile)	Manuel Pellegrini	–	–	–	–	1	–	–	1
(France)	Alain Perrin	–	–	–	–	1	–	–	1
(France)	Claude Puel	–	–	–	–	1	–	–	1
(Germany)	Ralf Rangnick	–	–	–	–	1	–	–	1
(England)	Harry Redknapp	–	–	–	–	1	–	–	1
(England)	Glenn Roeder	–	–	–	–	1	–	–	1
(France)	Guy Roux	–	–	–	–	1	–	–	1
(Germany)	Winfried Schäfer	–	–	–	–	1	–	–	1
(Germany)	Wolfgang Sidka	–	–	–	–	1	–	–	1
(France)	Francis Smerecki	–	–	–	–	1	–	–	1
(France)	Jean Tigana	–	–	–	–	1	–	–	1
(Portugal)	Jorge Jesus	–	–	–	–	1	–	–	1
(Netherlands)	George Knobel	–	–	–	–	–	1	–	1
(Spain)	Bernardino Pérez	–	–	–	–	–	1	–	1
(Romania)	Anghel Iordănescu	–	–	–	–	–	1	–	1
(Spain)	Luis Aragonés	–	–	–	–	–	–	1	1
(Socialist Federal Republic of Yugoslavia)	Vladica Popović	–	–	–	–	–	—	1	1

=== By nationality ===
This table lists the total number of titles won by managers of each nationality.

Nationality	CL	CWC	EL	UECL	UIC	SC	IC	Total
Italy	13	5	11	1	5	13	6	54
Spain	12	4	14	1	3	11	4	49
Germany	10	5	5	–	7	3	2	32
Netherlands	5	4	6	–	1	6	2	24
England	7	6	4	–	3	3	–	23
France	3	1	1	–	12	3	–	20
Scotland	4	4	1	1	–	2	1	13
Argentina	4	–	2	–	–	2	2	10
Portugal	3	1	3	1	1	–	–	9
Romania	3	–	1	–	–	2	1	7
Yugoslavia	1	2	–	–	1	1	2	7
Austria	2	–	1	1	–	–	1	5
Belgium	1	1	1	–	–	2	–	5
Soviet Union	–	3	–	–	–	1	–	4
Sweden	–	1	2	–	–	1	–	4
Hungary	2	1	–	–	–	–	–	3
Czechoslovakia	–	1	–	–	–	–	–	1
Australia	–	–	1	–	–	–	–	1
Russia	–	–	1	–	–	–	–	1
Turkey	–	–	1	–	–	–	–	1
Chile	–	–	–	–	1	–	–	1
Denmark	–	–	–	–	1	–	–	1
