= December 1934 =

Month of 1934

<<	December 1934					>>
Su	Mo	Tu	We	Th	Fr	Sa
						1
2	3	4	5	6	7	8
9	10	11	12	13	14	15
16	17	18	19	20	21	22
23	24	25	26	27	28	29
30	31

The following events occurred in December 1934:

== December 1, 1934 (Saturday) ==
- The high-ranking Soviet official Sergey Kirov was assassinated in Leningrad. Following the murder, Joseph Stalin would conduct a widespread purge of the Communist Party.
- José Luis Tejada Sorzano became the new President of Bolivia.
- Navy won the Army–Navy Game 3-0 at a muddy Franklin Field in Philadelphia.
- Died: Sergey Kirov, 48, Russian Bolshevik leader (assassinated)

== December 2, 1934 (Sunday) ==
- The newly refurbished Central Park Zoo opened in New York City after ten months of construction. Most of the old wooden structures were replaced by brick buildings.
- First public performance by the continental jazz group Quintette du Hot Club de France, at the École Normale de Musique in Paris, led by guitarist Django Reinhardt with violinist Stéphane Grappelli.
- Born: Andre Rodgers, baseball player, in Nassau, Bahamas (d. 2004)

== December 3, 1934 (Monday) ==
- In Rome, an accord was reached between Germany and France on some outstanding issues pertaining to the Saar ahead of January's referendum. Germany pledged to buy the Saar coal mines and guarantee equal rights to its citizens in the event of the region voting to reunify with Germany.
- Italian Cyrenaica, the Tripolitania and Fezzan were merged into Italian Libya.
- The U.S. Supreme Court decided Hamilton v. Regents of the University of California.
- Born: Viktor Gorbatko, cosmonaut, in Ventsy-Zarya, USSR (d. 2017)
- Died: Charles Ulm, 36, Australian aviator (disappeared during flight)

== December 4, 1934 (Tuesday) ==
- Chiang Kai-shek introduced compulsory labour service in China. The workers were mostly to be used for dikes, canals, roads and reforestation.
- Wilhelm Furtwängler resigned as general director of the Berlin State Opera, vice president of the Reichsmusikkammer and director of the Berlin Philharmonic in protest of the Nazi regulation of art.
- Akan National Park, Chūbu-Sangaku National Park and Daisetsuzan National Park were established in Japan.
- Born: Victor French, actor and director, in Santa Barbara, California (d. 1989)
- Died: Paul-Albert Besnard, 85, French painter and printmaker

== December 5, 1934 (Wednesday) ==
- The Abyssinia Crisis began when Ethiopian troops clashed with Somali Dubats in the service of Italy at the outpost of Welwel. The clash killed about 100 Ethiopians and 30 on the Italian side.
- Women in Turkey were given the right to vote.
- Actress Jean Harlow sued for divorce from her third husband Harold Rosson, charging many acts of cruelty.
- Born: Joan Didion, author, in Sacramento, California (d, 2021)

== December 6, 1934 (Thursday) ==
- The German cruiser Nürnberg was launched.
- A team of American baseball stars including Babe Ruth and Lou Gehrig played an exhibition game in Shanghai against a squad of U.S. Marines and missionaries.
- Born: Nick Bockwinkel, professional wrestler, in Saint Paul, Minnesota (d. 2015)
- Died: Charles Michael, Duke of Mecklenburg, 71

== December 7, 1934 (Friday) ==
- Direct trans-Pacific telephone service was inaugurated between the United States and Japan with the exchange of greetings between U.S. Secretary of State Cordell Hull and Japanese Foreign Minister Kōki Hirota.
- Born: Frank País, revolutionary, in Santiago de Cuba, Cuba (d. 1957)

== December 8, 1934 (Saturday) ==
- Weekly air mail service between England and Australia began.

== December 9, 1934 (Sunday) ==
- The New York Giants beat the Chicago Bears 30-13 in the NFL Championship Game at the Polo Grounds in New York City.
- Born:
  - Junior Wells, blues musician, in either Memphis, Tennessee or West Memphis, Arkansas (d. 1998)
  - Judi Dench, actress in Heworth, York, England

== December 10, 1934 (Monday) ==
- Yugoslavia and Hungary averted war by agreeing to a League of Nations resolution that condemned the October 9 assassination of Alexander of Yugoslavia and asked Hungary to take "punitive action against any authorities whose culpabilities have been established" and "communicate to the council the measures which it takes to this effect."
- The 1934 Nobel Prizes were awarded in Stockholm. The recipients were Harold Clayton Urey of the United States for Chemistry, George Hoyt Whipple, George Richards Minot and William Parry Murphy of the United States for Physiology or Medicine, and Luigi Pirandello (Literature). The Peace Prize was awarded in Oslo to Arthur Henderson. The Physics Prize was not awarded.
- Born: Howard Martin Temin, geneticist, virologist and Nobel laureate, in Philadelphia, Pennsylvania (d. 1994)
- Died: Eleanor Davies-Colley, 60, British surgeon

== December 11, 1934 (Tuesday) ==
- American woman Isobel Lillian Steele was released from prison in Nazi Germany after being held for four months on suspicion of espionage. Her case had garnered significant media attention in the United States, and when she returned there she did much to capitalize on her story by writing articles and a book, eventually even playing herself in the 1936 film I Was a Captive in Nazi Germany.
- Kerns Hotel fire: A fire broke out in a 211-room hotel in Lansing, Michigan, killing 32 people.
- Died: Paul Rougnon, 88, French composer, pianist and music educator

== December 12, 1934 (Wednesday) ==
- 150 were injured in Liverpool, England, when the floor of a school concert hall collapsed.

== December 13, 1934 (Thursday) ==
- The German cabinet issued twelve new decrees during its final session of the year. Several economic measures were passed as well as one providing a prison term of up to two years for those who "harm the state, its leaders, or the standing of the National Socialist party and its affiliations."

== December 14, 1934 (Friday) ==
- The British cargo ship Usworth sank in the Atlantic Ocean. Rescue operations were carried out but only nine of the 26 crew survived.
- 15 were killed and 7 hurt in Berlin when an express train carrying Adolf Hitler and other Nazi leaders struck a bus on a level grade crossing. All the dead and wounded were aboard the bus.
- Born: Marilyn Cooper, actress, in New York City (d. 2009); Charlie Hodge, musician, in Decatur, Alabama (d. 2006)

== December 15, 1934 (Saturday) ==
- President Roosevelt's economic security advisory committee approved an unemployment insurance system to be funded by employers through pay roll taxes.
- Born: Stanislav Shushkevich, Belarusian politician and scientist, in Minsk (d. 2022)
- Died: Victor Maslin Yeates, 37, British fighter pilot and author of the novel Winged Victory (tuberculosis)

== December 16, 1934 (Sunday) ==
- Benito Mussolini demanded an apology from Abyssinia over the Welwel incident, calling it a "sudden unprovoked aggression."
- Parliamentary elections were held in Portugal. The National Union was the only party on the ballot and claimed 100% of the vote.
- The two-day Fascist International Congress opened in Montreux, Switzerland.
- Born: Pete Wade, country session musician, in Norfolk, Virginia (d. 2024)

== December 17, 1934 (Monday) ==
- Flooding of the Tiber drove 1,000 residents of Rome from their homes.
- Born: Irving Petlin, painter, in Chicago, Illinois (d. 2018); Ray Wilson, footballer, in Shirebrook, Derbyshire (d. 2018)
- Died: Oemar Said Tjokroaminoto, 52, Indonesian nationalist

== December 18, 1934 (Tuesday) ==
- The Province of Latina was founded in Italy, consisting mostly of land reclaimed from the draining of the Pontine Marshes.
- Born: Boris Volynov, cosmonaut, in Irkutsk, USSR

== December 19, 1934 (Wednesday) ==
- Japan announced its renunciation of the Washington Naval Treaty after Britain and the United States refused to accord Japan naval parity.
- Attempted exclusion of Egon Kisch from Australia: The High Court of Australia found in favour of Egon Kisch and ruled that the dictation test administered to him was invalid because Scottish Gaelic was not a "European language" within the meaning of the Immigration Restriction Act.
- Nadir of American race relations: A lynch mob burned down a courthouse in Shelbyville, Tennessee, after learning that the young African-American man they wanted to hang had been transported to another county for his protection. National Guardsmen protecting the man killed 2 during a battle around the courthouse.
- Born: Aki Aleong, actor and singer, in Port of Spain, Trinidad and Tobago (d. 2025); Rudi Carrell, entertainer, in Alkmaar, Netherlands (d. 2006); Al Kaline, baseball player, in Baltimore, Maryland (d. 2020); Pratibha Patil, 12th President of India, in Nadgaon, British India

== December 20, 1934 (Thursday) ==
- The engagement of Infante Jaime, Duke of Segovia to the French-Italian noblewoman Emmanuelle de Dampierre was announced.
- Nazi Germany established the Treachery Act.

== December 21, 1934 (Friday) ==
- Despite the ongoing Anglo-Irish Trade War, the British and Irish signed an agreement promoting trade in coal and cattle between the two countries.
- Lieutenant Kijé, one of Sergei Prokofiev's best-known works, premiered.
- Born: Hank Crawford, musician, in Memphis, Tennessee (d. 2009)

== December 22, 1934 (Saturday) ==
- British, Italian, Dutch and Swedish troops entered the Saar to keep the peace during the January 13 referendum.

== December 23, 1934 (Sunday) ==
- The Soviet Union announced that Grigory Zinoviev and Lev Kamenev were among those arrested in connection with the assassination of Sergey Kirov.
- The British adventure film The Scarlet Pimpernel starring Leslie Howard was released.
- Died: Chan Siu-bak, 65, Chinese revolutionary

== December 24, 1934 (Monday) ==
- Pope Pius XI delivered a Christmas address to the world, saying it was as necessary as ever for mankind to choose Luke 2:14 ("on earth peace, good will toward men") as its "unceasing prayer." For those who wanted war, the pope said he had formulated another prayer: "destroy, O Lord, the people who wish for war."
- Rudolf Hess gave a Christmas message to Nazi Germany over government-controlled radio, saying "The world today realizes it is only thanks to Hitler that the peace of Europe was saved in the past year when it was repeatedly endangered. Hitler's carefulness and the statements he issued lessened international tension and showed him as a statesman of world importance. He is the chancellor of peace."
- Mussolini ordered General Emilio De Bono to Eritrea to take command of the Italian forces there.
- Nazi police arrested and imprisoned an American woman in Waldmohr for remarks she made during a conversation in a restaurant, allegedly saying that Hitler had Jewish blood.
- A leading baseball and professional sports club in Japan, Yomiuri Giants of Tokyo was founded.
- Born: Stjepan Mesić, Croatian politician, in Orahovica, Yugoslavia

== December 25, 1934 (Tuesday) ==
- 15 died and 40 were hurt in a train collision in Dundas, Ontario, Canada.
- The stage comedy Accent on Youth premiered at the Playmouth Theatre on Broadway.

== December 26, 1934 (Wednesday) ==
- The Montevideo Convention went into effect.
- Died: Wallace Thurman, 32, American novelist (tuberculosis)

== December 27, 1934 (Thursday) ==
- At midnight the Saar's borders were closed until after the January 13 referendum to keep out potential agitators.
- Rezā Shāh of Persia requested that his country be henceforth referred to as Iran.
- The Frank Capra-directed comedy-drama film Broadway Bill starring Warner Baxter and Myrna Loy was released.
- Born: Larisa Latynina, gymnast, in Kherson, Ukrainian SSR, Soviet Union

== December 28, 1934 (Friday) ==
- The Tongguan-to-Xi'an section of the Longhai Railway opened in China.
- The films The Little Minister starring Katharine Hepburn and Bright Eyes starring Shirley Temple were released.
- Born:
  - Yujiro Ishihara, actor and singer, in Kobe, Japan (d. 1987)
  - Maggie Smith, actress, in Ilford, Essex, England (d. 2024)
- Died: Lowell Sherman, 49, American actor and film director

== December 29, 1934 (Saturday) ==
- George Gershwin performed at the White House for President Roosevelt.
- Born: Ed Flanders, actor, in Minneapolis, Minnesota (d. 1995)
- Died: Leonid Nikolaev, 29 or 30, Russian assassin of Sergei Kirov (executed by shooting)

== December 30, 1934 (Sunday) ==
- About 40 to 50 members of the Mexican paramilitary organization the Red Shirts opened fire on churchgoers leaving Mass in Coyoacán, killing 5. One of the Red Shirts was beaten to death by an angry crowd to bring the death toll to 6.
- Mussolini wrote a memorandum for Marshal Pietro Badoglio titled "Directive and Plan of Action to Solve the Abyssinian question." "I decide on this war, the object of which is nothing more than the complete destruction of the Abyssinian army and the total conquest of Abyssinia", Mussolini wrote. "In no other way can we build the empire."
- Born: John N. Bahcall, astrophysicist, in Shreveport, Louisiana (d. 2005); Joseph P. Hoar, U.S. Marine Corps general, in Boston, Massachusetts (d. 2022); Del Shannon, rock and roll and country musician, in Grand Rapids, Michigan (d. 1990); Russ Tamblyn, actor and dancer, in Los Angeles

== December 31, 1934 (Monday) ==
- Paraguay won another victory in the Chaco War as 1,200 surrounded Bolivians surrendered at Ibibobo.
- 62 Red Shirts were imprisoned in Mexico over the previous day's killings.
