= November 1934 =

Month of 1934

<<	November 1934					>>
Su	Mo	Tu	We	Th	Fr	Sa
				1	2	3
4	5	6	7	8	9	10
11	12	13	14	15	16	17
18	19	20	21	22	23	24
25	26	27	28	29	30

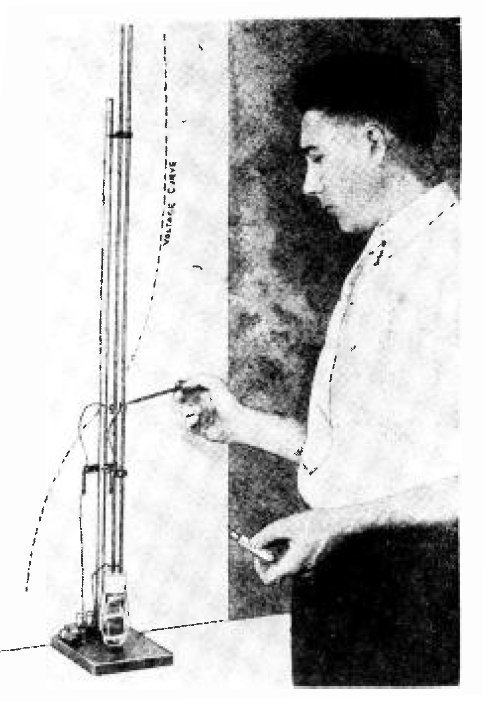
An experimental 120 MHz vacuum tube amateur radio transmitter with a Lecher line tank circuit, built by George W. Shuart, W2AMN, in November 1934.

The following events occurred in November 1934:

== November 1, 1934 (Thursday) ==
- Winston Churchill warned Britain that Germany was re-arming "secretly, illegally and rapidly." He expressed astonishment at the government's attitude "when we consider the character of the present German government, the rapidly darkening European scene, and the obligations which ministers repeatedly are declaring we have in Europe."
- Born: Umberto Agnelli, Swiss-born Italian industrialist and politician, in Lausanne (d. 2004)

== November 2, 1934 (Friday) ==
- The League of Nations defused a potential war between Colombia and Peru over the disputed Leticia region.
- A team of American baseball stars including Babe Ruth and Lou Gehrig arrived in Japan to begin a tour of exhibition games against Asian teams. Over the next five weeks the American stars would play games in Japan, China and the Philippines.
- Born: Ken Rosewall, tennis player, in Sydney, Australia
- Died: Edmond James de Rothschild, 89, French member of the Rothschild banking family

== November 3, 1934 (Saturday) ==
- Charles Kingsford Smith concluded the first eastward air crossing of the Pacific Ocean (from his native Brisbane) with the first eastward flight from Hawaii to North America, landing his Lockheed Altair Lady Southern Cross in San Francisco.
- Hermann Göring urged Germany's hunters to donate one week's bag of game to the Winterhilfswerk program.
- Died: Sir Robert McAlpine, 87, British builder and businessman

== November 4, 1934 (Sunday) ==
- The first-ever match of India's Ranji Trophy cricket tournament was held between Madras and Mysore at Chepauk.
- Died: Waldemar Kophamel, 54, German U-boat commander

== November 5, 1934 (Monday) ==
- Carl Friedrich Goerdeler was appointed Price Commissioner of Nazi Germany in response to complaints of price gouging.

== November 6, 1934 (Tuesday) ==
- Attempted exclusion of Egon Kisch from Australia: The Austrian-Czechoslovak Jewish communist Egon Erwin Kisch arrived in Fremantle, Western Australia aboard the RMS Strathaird but was refused entry as an "undesirable". Kisch was allowed to remain in the ship and travel on to Melbourne.
- The United States midterm elections were held. The incumbent Democratic Party increased its seat count in the House of Representatives.
- Born: Barton Myers, architect, in Norfolk, Virginia

== November 7, 1934 (Wednesday) ==
- The engagement of Infanta Beatriz of Spain and Alessandro Torlonia, 5th Prince of Civitella-Cesi was announced.
- The Southern Rhodesian general election was held. The new United Party led by Godfrey Huggins won 24 out of 30 seats.
- Born: Jackie Joseph, actress, in Los Angeles

== November 8, 1934 (Thursday) ==
- Pierre-Étienne Flandin succeeded Gaston Doumergue as Prime Minister of France.

== November 9, 1934 (Friday) ==
- Australian Attorney-General Robert Menzies said that Egon Kisch would not be allowed into the country, explaining that the Commonwealth had the right to protect itself from revolutionaries.
- Lord Chief Justice Hewart dismissed contempt of court charges against four London newspapers. They were accused of prejudicing a fair trial for four Fascists charged with assault and breaching the peace by reporting that they wore brass knuckles in court.
- Born: S. Henry Cho, taekwondo instructor, in Korea (d. 2012); Carl Sagan, astronomer and science communicator, in Brooklyn, New York (d. 1996)

== November 10, 1934 (Saturday) ==
- College football star Abe Mickal was made a Louisiana State Senator in a special meeting convened by Huey Long, who arranged for the appointment in order to mock Governor Oscar K. Allen's failure to set an election to fill the vacancy left by Jared Y. Sanders, Sr.
- Born: Norm Cash, baseball player, in Justiceburg, Texas (d. 1986); Joanna Moore, actress, in Parrott, Georgia (d. 1997)
- Died: Ion Farris, 56, American politician and attorney

== November 11, 1934 (Sunday) ==
- The Shrine of Remembrance in Melbourne, Australia, was officially dedicated.
- Bolivia held a general election, although the results were later nullified.

== November 12, 1934 (Monday) ==
- The German cruiser Admiral Scheer was launched.
- Abe Mickal declined to take his seat as a Louisiana senator. "Our good friend Abe needed to stay in his dormitory and study", Huey Long explained.
- The Strathaird arrived in Melbourne where Egon Kisch was greeted by numerous supporters, whom he acknowledged from the deck by raising his fist.
- Born: Charles Manson, cult leader and criminal, in Cincinnati, Ohio (d. 2017)

== November 13, 1934 (Tuesday) ==
- The 10 millionth Chevrolet was produced. It was donated to the city of Flint, Michigan for police safety patrol duties.
- Ralph Bowman of the St. Louis Eagles scored the first penalty shot goal in NHL history. It was also the first goal of Bowman's NHL career.
- All teachers in Italy were ordered to wear the Fascist uniform during school hours.
- Egon Kisch jumped from the Strathaird onto Melbourne's concrete dock, breaking his leg. Kisch held the mistaken belief that he would be arrested and detained on Australian soil if he set foot in the country. Instead, authorities carried him back onto the ship as it sailed for Sydney.
- Born: John Gowans, 16th General of the Salvation Army, in Blantyre, Scotland (d. 2012)

== November 14, 1934 (Wednesday) ==
- England and Italy played a famously violent and contentious football match called the Battle of Highbury that England won 3–2.
- Salvador Dalí and his wife Gala arrived in New York City aboard the ocean liner SS Champlain. Dalí emerged to greet the American media conspicuously holding a 2.5-metre (8 ft 2 in) long loaf of bread, with the intention of distributing it among them "as Saint Francis did with his birds." To his disappointment, however, none of the reporters asked him about it.

== November 15, 1934 (Thursday) ==
- Archaeologists announced that an entire section of the ancient city of Carthage had been unearthed.
- The Strathaird arrived in Sydney but Egon Kisch was not allowed to leave the ship.

== November 16, 1934 (Friday) ==
- Australian High Court Justice H. V. Evatt ordered Egon Kisch discharged from detainment aboard the Strathaird. Kisch was removed from the ship and then immediately taken to a police station where customs officials subjected him to a dictation test in Gaelic. Although Kisch knew 11 languages, he refused to take the test and was deemed to have failed. Kisch was charged with being a prohibited immigrant and then taken to hospital for his broken leg. Kisch would take his case to the High Court of Australia.
- Austrian Chancellor Kurt Schuschnigg met Benito Mussolini in Rome.
- Bob Olin won the world light heavyweight boxing championship by decision over Maxie Rosenbloom at Madison Square Garden in New York.
- Died: Alice Liddell, 82, English inspiration for Alice's Adventures in Wonderland; Carl von Linde, 92, German scientist, engineer and founder of The Linde Group

== November 17, 1934 (Saturday) ==
- Paraguay won a major victory in the Chaco War, capturing seven Bolivian forts on their main defensive line.
- Born: Jim Inhofe, politician, in Des Moines, Iowa (d. 2024)
- Died: Joachim Ringelnatz, 51, German author and painter

== November 18, 1934 (Sunday) ==
- The Nazi Party won elections in the Free City of Danzig, where opposition parties were still permitted to run.
- Huey Long said he planned to run for President of the United States in 1936 on a third-party ticket.

== November 19, 1934 (Monday) ==
- The New York Daily News ran a famous headline exposing the secret of professional wrestling: "Londos and Marshall Meet at Garden Tonight for the 26th Time. Score – Londos 26, Marshall 0." Promoter Jack Pfefer exposed wrestling's predetermined nature to exact revenge on his former business associates, and he got the result he wanted when pro wrestling attendance immediately plummeted.
- German Labour Front leader Robert Ley decreed that time clock punching would be abolished and replaced with bugle calls.
- Born: Jackie Hudson, Dominican sister and anti-nuclear activist, in Saginaw, Michigan (d. 2011)

== November 20, 1934 (Tuesday) ==
- Retired U.S. Marine Corps officer Smedley Butler caused an uproar when he gave testimony before a House of Representatives committee on un-American activities in which he alleged a conspiracy among Wall Street interests to overthrow the Roosevelt Administration and replace it with a fascist dictatorship. This alleged conspiracy would come to be known as the Business Plot.
- King George V opened a new session of British parliament with a throne speech appealing for the maintenance of world peace.
- Georges Theunis became Prime Minister of Belgium for the second time.

== November 21, 1934 (Wednesday) ==
- The Cole Porter musical Anything Goes premiered at the Alvin Theatre on Broadway.
- Seventeen-year-old Ella Fitzgerald made her singing debut at Harlem's Apollo Theater, winning first prize in the venue's famous amateur contest.
- The New York Yankees obtained the rights to 19-year-old Joe DiMaggio from the minor-league San Francisco Seals in exchange for players to be named later and cash.
- Born: Laurence Luckinbill, actor, in Fort Smith, Arkansas

== November 22, 1934 (Thursday) ==
- Dora Russell was granted a divorce from husband Bertrand in British court on grounds of immoral conduct.
- Yugoslavia sent the League of Nations a note accusing Hungary of being behind the assassination of King Alexander.
- Died: Harry Steppe, 46, American vaudeville performer

== November 23, 1934 (Friday) ==
- Piano Concerto no. 1 by Darius Milhaud was first performed in Paris.
- The films The Painted Veil starring Greta Garbo and Anne of Green Gables starring Dawn O'Day were released.
- Born: Lew Hoad, tennis player, in Glebe, Australia (d. 1994)
- Died: Arthur Wing Pinero, 79, English actor, dramatist and stage director

== November 24, 1934 (Saturday) ==
- The ANZAC War Memorial in Sydney, Australia, was unveiled.
- Samuel Insull and 16 former business associates were found not guilty of mail fraud in Chicago federal court.
- The Sarnia Imperials defeated the Regina Roughriders 20–12 to win the Grey Cup of Canadian football.
- Born: Alfred Schnittke, composer, in Engels, Volga German ASSR, Soviet Union (d. 1998)

== November 25, 1934 (Sunday) ==
- The Deutsche Allgemeine Zeitung published an article by the conductor and composer Wilhelm Furtwängler strongly defending fellow composer Paul Hindemith, who had been labeled a degenerate artist by the Nazi regime. That evening before conducting at the Berlin State Opera, Furtwängler received a 20-minute standing ovation.

== November 26, 1934 (Monday) ==
- Turkish President Mustafa Kemal changed his name to Mustafa Kemal Atatürk as the Turkish government abolished nicknames, pious titles and titles of nobility. "Atatürk" means "father of the Turks" and use of the surname by anyone else was forbidden by Turkish parliament.
- University of Bonn professor Karl Barth was suspended and tried in court for refusing to swear the oath of loyalty to Hitler.

== November 27, 1934 (Tuesday) ==
- The Battle of Barrington: U.S. federal agents killed the notorious criminal Baby Face Nelson in a gunfight in Barrington, Illinois. One FBI agent was also killed, and another mortally wounded.
- Bolivian President Daniel Salamanca Urey was overthrown by a military coup due to the country's disastrous performance in the Chaco War.
- All communist organizations were banned in Romania.
- Born: Ammo Baba, footballer and coach, in Baghdad, Iraq (d. 2009); Gilbert Strang, mathematician, in Chicago, Illinois
- Died: Herman Hollis, 31, American law enforcement official (shot); Baby Face Nelson, 25, American criminal (shot by FBI agents)

== November 28, 1934 (Wednesday) ==
- Winston Churchill gave a speech to the House of Commons calling on the government to increase its defence spending, because Germany's munitions factories were already working "under practically war conditions."
- Lord Ashley was granted a divorce from wife Sylvia. Spectators packed the courtroom hoping to hear lurid details of Sylvia's affair with the American actor Douglas Fairbanks, but were disappointed when the legal proceedings lasted only ten minutes.
- The musical comedy Revenge with Music opened at the New Amsterdam Theatre on Broadway.
- The dramatic play Gold Eagle Guy premiered at the Morosco Theatre on Broadway.
- Died: Samuel P. Cowley, 35, American FBI agent (shot)

== November 29, 1934 (Thursday) ==
- Prince George, Duke of Kent married Princess Marina of Greece and Denmark at Westminster Abbey.
- Born: Willie Morris, American writer, in Jackson, Mississippi (d. 1999)

== November 30, 1934 (Friday) ==
- King Fuad of Egypt suspended the constitution after nationalist riots.
- Lázaro Cárdenas took the oath of office as President of Mexico. In his inaugural address before 60,000 people he said his administration would focus on unemployment and social inequality.
- London and North Eastern Railway steam locomotive Class A3 4472 Flying Scotsman became the first officially to exceed 100 miles per hour (160.9 km/h) on test in England.
- The musical film Babes in Toyland starring Laurel and Hardy was released.
- The British comedy-drama film The Private Life of Don Juan starring Douglas Fairbanks was released.
- Born: Lansana Conté, 2nd President of Guinea, in Dubréka, French Guinea (d. 2008)
- Died: Hélène Boucher, 26, French pilot (plane crash)
