= February 1935 =

Month of 1935

<<	February 1935					>>
Su	Mo	Tu	We	Th	Fr	Sa
					1	2
3	4	5	6	7	8	9
10	11	12	13	14	15	16
17	18	19	20	21	22	23
24	25	26	27	28

The following events occurred in February 1935:

== February 1, 1935 (Friday) ==
- French and British representatives met in London to discuss Germany's plans to rearm.
- The Hagia Sophia in Istanbul was reopened as a museum.
- The BBC said it would begin the world's first public television service by the end of the year.

== February 2, 1935 (Saturday) ==
- The North Dakota Supreme Court ousted Thomas H. Moodie as Governor, ruling he had not been an official resident of North Dakota for five years and was therefore not eligible to hold the office. Walter Welford succeeded him.

== February 3, 1935 (Sunday) ==
- Britain and France announced a proposal to legalize German armaments as well as an air agreement to come to the other's aid if either country was "the victim of unprovoked aerial aggression."

== February 4, 1935 (Monday) ==
- Great Britain, France and Sweden informed the League of Nations that they were lifting their arms embargo against Bolivia.
- Born: Martti Talvela, operatic bass, in Hiitola, Finland (d. 1989)

== February 5, 1935 (Tuesday) ==
- France mobilized 14,000 police and 20,000 mobile guards in anticipation of trouble on the one-year anniversary of the 6 February 1934 crisis.
- Born: Alex Harvey, blues and rock musician, in Glasgow, Scotland (d. 1982)
- Died: Jackson Showalter, 75, American chess champion

== February 6, 1935 (Wednesday) ==
- On the first anniversary of "Bloody Tuesday", violent clashes took place in Paris between police and various demonstrators around the Place de la Concorde, the Sorbonne and the Boulevard Saint-Michel. Prime Minister Pierre-Étienne Flandin was jeered as he attended a memorial at Notre-Dame de Paris for the 19 victims of last year's violence. 1,261 communists were arrested by police.
- Parker Brothers began selling the board game Monopoly.
- 14 people were killed in avalanches in Switzerland, Germany and Austria.
- A Cincinnati bookmaker was found guilty of the August 1934 kidnapping of John Sackville Labatt and sentenced to 15 years imprisonment in Kingston Penitentiary.

== February 7, 1935 (Thursday) ==
- Joseph Stalin was elected as a member of the Presidium of the Central Executive Committee of the Soviet Union.

== February 8, 1935 (Friday) ==
- The Constitutional Convention in the Philippines approved the draft of the Constitution by a vote of 177–1.
- General elections were held in Turkey. They were the first Turkish elections under which women could vote.
- Died: Max Liebermann, 87, German-Jewish painter and printmaker

== February 9, 1935 (Saturday) ==
- Sonja Henie of Norway won the ladies' competition of the World Figure Skating Championships for the ninth consecutive year in Vienna, Austria.
- Born: Lionel Fanthorpe, priest, entertainer and television presenter, in Dereham, England

== February 10, 1935 (Sunday) ==
- John Fisher and Thomas More were recognized as martyrs by Pope Pius XI, a precursor to their canonization.
- During religious services in Munich, Cardinal Michael von Faulhaber protested against the Nazis' recent action of confiscating letters from church dignitaries to Catholic parents. The letters were written in regard to the pressure from the government to withdraw children from Catholic schools and send them to Nazi-controlled public schools instead. "It is useless for the government to violate the freedom of the church and intercept its mail", Faulhaber said. "The Apostle Paul was placed in chains, but his letters went around the world. Whoever passes laws and ordinances against the Catholic Church is liable to excommunication."
- Gracie Fields signed a record £150,000 contract to make three films.

== February 11, 1935 (Monday) ==
- Abyssinia Crisis: Benito Mussolini mobilized 250,000 soldiers and ordered 50 planes to Eritrea.
- The lowest recorded temperature in Africa is -24 °C (-11 °F) at Ifrane, Morocco.
- Born: Gene Vincent, rock and rockabilly musician, in Norfolk, Virginia (d. 1971)

== February 12, 1935 (Tuesday) ==
- The airship USS Macon crashed and sank in a storm off Point Sur, California. Although 2 crew were lost, this was a much lighter loss of life than the Akron and Shenandoah air disasters.
- Died: Auguste Escoffier, 88, French chef and culinary writer; Lyon Gardiner Tyler, 81, American educator and historian

== February 13, 1935 (Wednesday) ==
- After 11 hours of deliberation, the jury in the Lindbergh kidnapping case found Richard Hauptmann guilty of murder and sentenced him to death.

== February 14, 1935 (Thursday) ==
- France ordered troops to French Somaliland to guard against any border incidents during the Abyssinia Crisis.
- Germany sent its reply to the Anglo-French proposal regarding German armaments. In the note Germany welcomed the prospect of talks but said little else specific.
- Born: Rob McConnell, jazz musician, in London, Ontario, Canada (d. 2010)

== February 15, 1935 (Friday) ==
- A House committee on un-American activities led by John William McCormack recommended that legislation be enacted to protect the United States from foreign propaganda. Proposed measures included requiring all publicity agents of foreign organizations to register with the Secretary of State and that treaties be negotiated with other nations to facilitate the deportation of undesirable aliens.

== February 16, 1935 (Saturday) ==
- German baroness Benita von Falkenhayn was sentenced to execution by beheading for helping her lover Jerzy Sosnowski, a spy for Poland.
- The first Italian troops departed for Africa as Mussolini told Italy to "be ready for any eventuality."
- The film The Woman in Red starring Barbara Stanwyck was released.
- Born: Sonny Bono, singer, actor and politician, in Detroit, Michigan (d. 1998)

== February 17, 1935 (Sunday) ==
- Karl Schäfer of Austria won the men's competition of the World Figure Skating Championships in Budapest, Hungary.
- Born: Christina Pickles, actress, in Yorkshire, England

== February 18, 1935 (Monday) ==
- The U.S. Supreme Court decided the Gold Clause Cases. By a 5–4 vote, the Roosevelt Administration's policy on the ownership of gold was upheld. The New York Stock Exchange surged in response to the news.
- Canadian Parliament approved the introduction of unemployment insurance.
- The George Bernard Shaw play The Simpleton of the Unexpected Isles premiered at the Guild Theatre in New York.
- Born: Ciarán Bourke, folk musician, in Dublin, Ireland (d. 1988)
- Died: Benita von Falkenhayn, 34, German baroness (executed); Renate von Natzmer, 36 or 37, German noblewoman (executed)

== February 19, 1935 (Tuesday) ==
- Italy rejected a proposal from Ethiopia to establish a neutral zone along the borders of Italian Somaliland.
- The Clifford Odets drama Awake and Sing! premiered at the Belasco Theatre on Broadway.

== February 20, 1935 (Wednesday) ==
- U.S. President Franklin D. Roosevelt asked Congress to extend the National Recovery Administration for two years after June 16, the date set for its expiration.

== February 21, 1935 (Thursday) ==
- Nazi Germany expressly prohibited the Jewish philosopher Martin Buber from giving lectures to Jewish organizations.
- Died: Luis Pardo, 52, Chilean naval officer

== February 22, 1935 (Friday) ==
- Rodolfo Graziani was sent to Africa to lead Italy's military operations against Ethiopia.
- The comedy-drama film The Little Colonel starring Shirley Temple was released.
- Born: Hisako Kyōda, voice actress, in Tokyo, Japan

== February 23, 1935 (Saturday) ==
- Paraguay quit the League of Nations.
- The animated short film The Band Concert, the first Mickey Mouse film produced in color, was released.
- Died: Frank Rio, 39, American mobster (heart attack)

== February 24, 1935 (Sunday) ==
- Swiss voters approved a referendum on a federal law reorganizing the military.
- Adolf Hitler marked the 15th anniversary of the founding of the Nazi Party with a speech in Munich, serving notice to the world that Germany would not sign any document that would surrender the country's honor and equality among nations. "Conversely, the world can also rest assured that, when we do sign something, we adhere to it", Hitler stated. "Whatever we believe we cannot adhere to, on principles of honor or ability, we never sign. Whatever we have once signed we will blindly and faithfully fulfill!"
- The Heinkel He 111 had its first flight.

== February 25, 1935 (Monday) ==
- German Interior Minister Wilhelm Frick decreed that April 20, Hitler's birthday, would henceforth be an important national holiday. As the Kaiser's birthday was in the days of imperial Germany, it would be a day on which titles, promotions and other special honors were to be bestowed.
- Jack Hobbs announced his retirement from cricket.
- Died: Gerhard Louis De Geer, 80, 17th Prime Minister of Sweden

== February 26, 1935 (Tuesday) ==
- The Luftwaffe was secretly established in Nazi Germany in violation of the Treaty of Versailles.
- Babe Ruth was released by the New York Yankees. He immediately signed a three-year contract with the Boston Braves to serve as their vice president and assistant manager.
- The Australian government announced that Egon Kisch had agreed to leave Australia in exchange for the three-month prison sentence imposed on him being remitted.

== February 27, 1935 (Wednesday) ==
- The 7th Academy Awards were held. It Happened One Night swept the top five award categories. Shirley Temple was given the first-ever Juvenile Award, a miniature-size Oscar.
- A judge in Delaware ruled that section 7-A of the NRA, the section covering collective bargaining, was unconstitutional. The judge threw out a government lawsuit against Weirton Steel and the Roosevelt Administration suffered a significant blow.
- Born: Mirella Freni, opera soprano, in Modena, Italy (d. 2020)

== February 28, 1935 (Thursday) ==
- Contraceptives were banned in the Irish Free State.
- Wallace Carothers created the first sample of nylon at DuPont's research facility in Wilmington, Delaware.
- Died: Arthur Lowes Dickinson, 75, British accountant and business theorist
