= Boże, Warmian-Masurian Voivodeship =

Boże
- Village
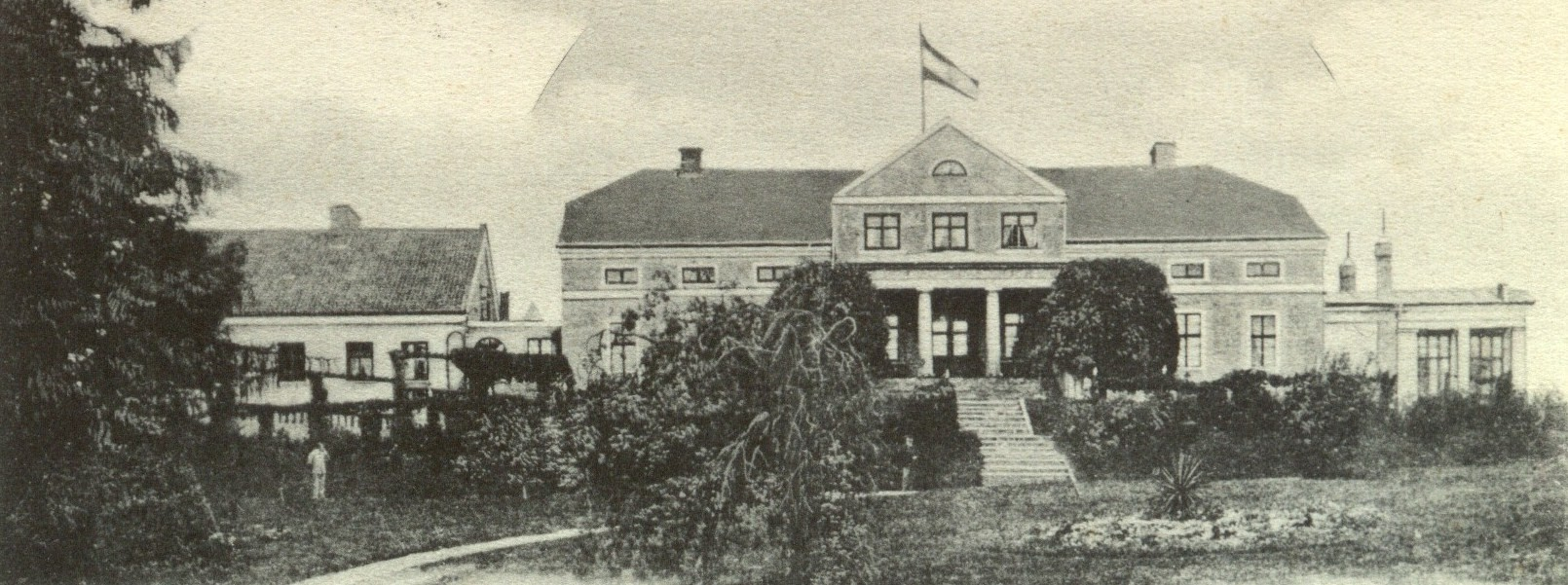
- Bosemb manor house in 1902

- Location within Poland
- Coordinates: 53°57′N 21°22′E
- Country: Poland
- Voivodeship: Warmian-Masurian
- County: Mrągowo
- Gmina: Mrągowo

Boże [ˈbɔʐɛ] is a village in the administrative district of Gmina Mrągowo, within Mrągowo County, Warmian-Masurian Voivodeship, in northern Poland.

As a result of the Treaty of Versailles the 1920 East Prussian plebiscite was organized on 11 July 1920 under the control of the League of Nations, which resulted in 260 votes to remain in Germany and none for Poland. Thus the village remained part of Germany until 1945.

== Notable residents ==
- Udo Lattek (1935-2015), German football coach
