= Udo Lattek =

German football player and coach (1935–2015)

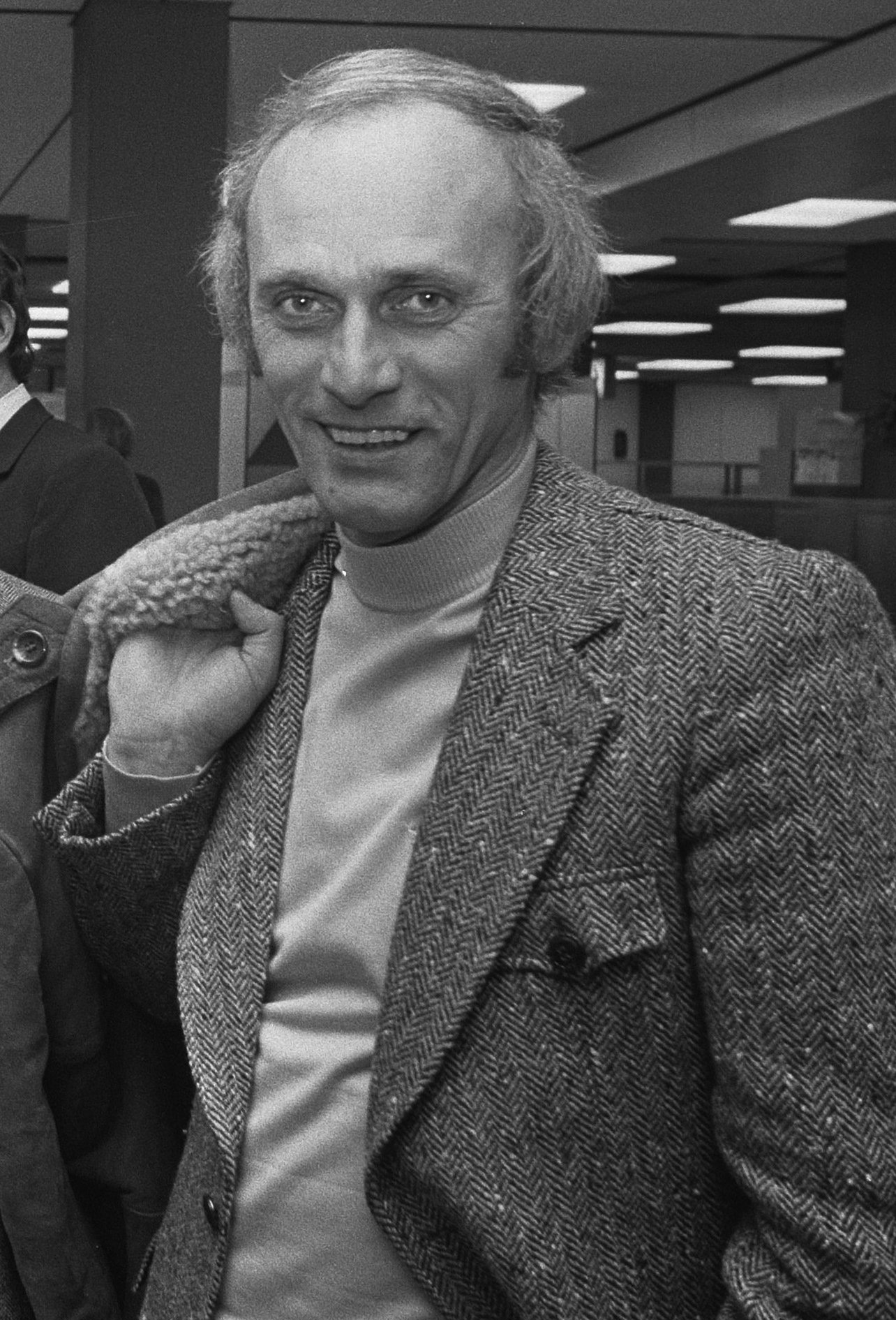
- Lattek in the early 1970s

Personal information
- Date of birth: 16 January 1935
- Place of birth: Bosemb, Germany
- Date of death: 31 January 2015 (aged 80)
- Place of death: Cologne, Germany
- Position: Striker

Senior career*
Years	Team	Apps	(Gls)
- SSV Marienheide
- Bayer Leverkusen
- VfR Wipperfürth
1962–1965	VfL Osnabrück	70	(34)

Managerial career
- VfR Wipperfürth
- 1965–1970: West Germany (assistant coach)
- 1970–1975: Bayern Munich
- 1975–1979: Borussia Mönchengladbach
- 1979–1981: Borussia Dortmund
- 1981–1983: Barcelona
- 1983–1987: Bayern Munich
- 1991: 1. FC Köln
- 1992–1993: Schalke 04
- 2000: Borussia Dortmund
- * Club domestic league appearances and goals

Udo Lattek (16 January 1935 – 31 January 2015) was a German professional football player and coach.

Lattek is one of the most successful coaches in the history of the game, having won 15 major titles, most famously with Bayern Munich. He also won major trophies with Borussia Mönchengladbach and Barcelona. In addition to these clubs, his managerial career saw him coach Borussia Dortmund, Schalke 04 and 1. FC Köln before his retirement from the game. Alongside the Italian Giovanni Trapattoni and Portuguese José Mourinho, he is the only coach to have won all three major European club titles, and—along with Mourinho—the only one to do so with three clubs.

== Early life ==
Lattek was born in Bosemb, East Prussia, Germany (now Boże, Poland). While Lattek was preparing for a career as a teacher, he played football with SSV Marienheide, Bayer Leverkusen and VfR Wipperfürth. In 1962, he joined VfL Osnabrück. He spent his first season at the club in the first division (the northern division of the "Oberliga") and the remainder of his time in the second division, as the club did not qualify for the new Bundesliga at its inception 1963. He played primarily as a centre forward and became known for his heading ability. He scored 34 goals in 70 league matches between 1962 and 1965.

Early in 1965, Lattek was prematurely released from his playing contract to join the German football association DFB as a youth team coach alongside Dettmar Cramer, one of the assistants to head coach Helmut Schön. In this role he was also part of the coaching staff which led Germany into the final of the 1966 World Cup.

== Career ==
=== Bayern Munich ===
In March 1970, Lattek took over the reins of Bayern Munich as successor of the Croatian, Branko Zebec. He was recommended to the club by Franz Beckenbauer, however his appointment was controversial as he had never previously coached a club side. To a team already boasting Beckenbauer, Gerd Müller and Sepp Maier, Lattek added the young talents of Paul Breitner and Uli Hoeneß, ushering in a period of near dominance for the Bavarian club. Lattek led Bayern to three consecutive league titles, a first in German football history, as well as the German Cup. In 1974 they became the first German team to win the European Champions Cup, defeating Atlético Madrid in the final, in a replay. It was the first of three consecutive European Cup successes for the club (although Lattek was only there for the first of them).

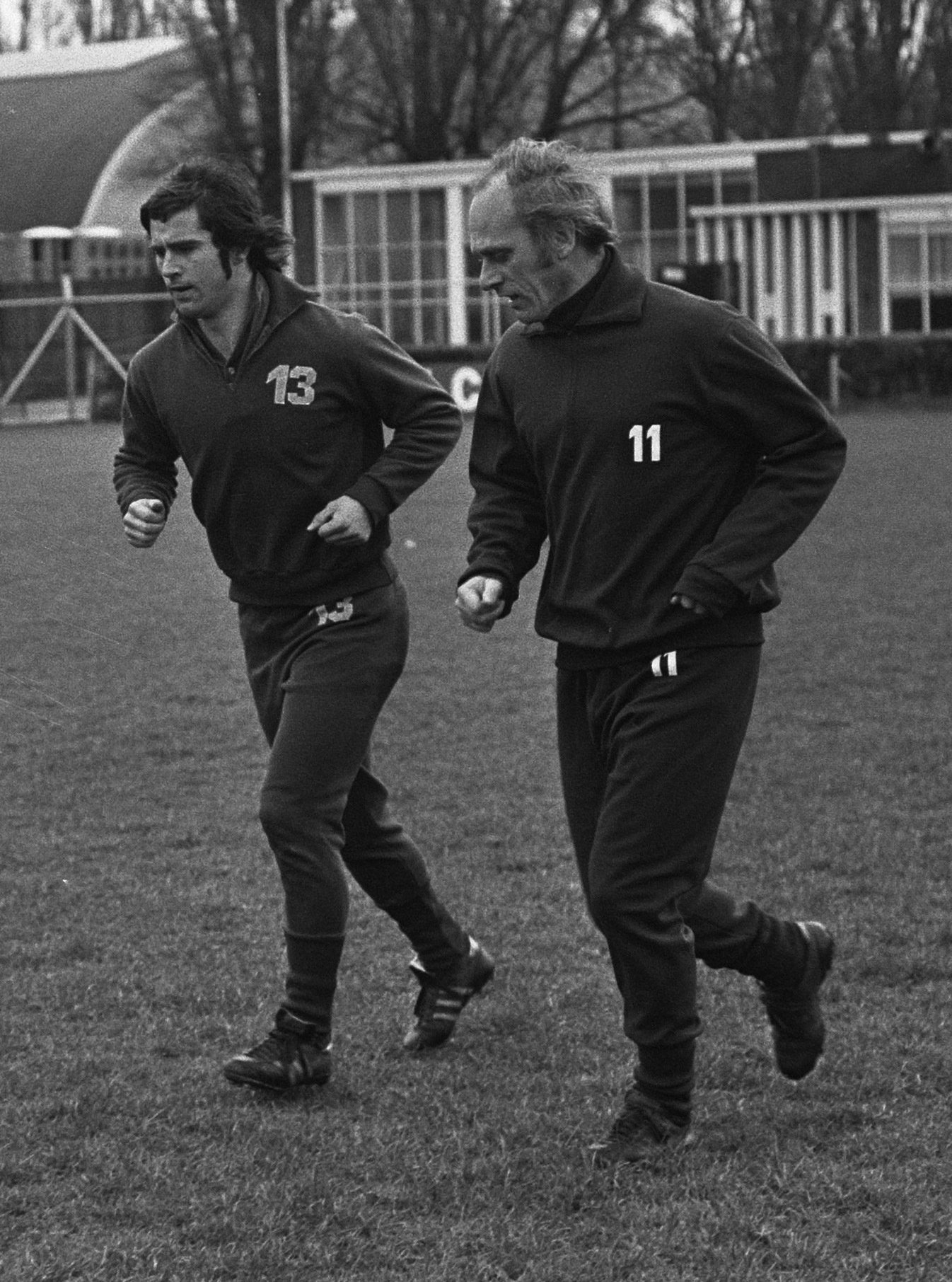
Lattek (right) coaching Gerd Müller in 1973

Six players from the Bayern side were also part of the West German side that won the 1974 World Cup and 1972 European Championship. A poor start to the 1974–75 domestic season saw Lattek's tenure come to an end, with Bayern replacing him with Dettmar Cramer, who was also recommended to the club by Beckenbauer. According to Lattek, after telling club president Wilhelm Neudecker that, given the club's poor domestic form changes were necessary, Neudecker replied, "Correct. You're sacked."

=== Borussia Mönchengladbach ===
At the beginning of the 1975–76 season, Lattek succeeded Hennes Weisweiler at Borussia Mönchengladbach, where he stayed until 1979. This spell saw him win two more German titles, in addition to achieving further European success with victory in the 1979 UEFA Cup final, defeating Red Star Belgrade. A third consecutive championship for him, which would have been a record fourth consecutive league championship for the club, eluded Mönchengladbach when they came second in the race to 1. FC Köln, managed by Lattek's predecessor Hennes Weisweiler, by the narrowest of margins, that of goal difference.

In 1977, the club reached the European Cup final against Liverpool in Rome, which they lost 3–1. Liverpool declined to participate in the ensuing matches for the Intercontinental Cup, so Borussia took their place against South American champions Boca Juniors in the final. After drawing 2–2 in Argentina, Mönchengladbach lost the home match in Karlsruhe 3–0.

=== Borussia Dortmund ===
At the end of that season, Lattek quit Mönchengladbach and spent two undistinguished years with Borussia Dortmund. In his time at Mönchengladbach he had managed legendary striker Jupp Heynckes (226 goals in 375 league matches / 51 goals in 64 European competition matches), along with great Danish forward Allan Simonsen and such national team stalwarts as Berti Vogts, Rainer Bonhof, Uli Stielike, and Herbert Wimmer. At Dortmund he lacked that wealth of talent, and at the time his new club did not have the resources or the patience to develop it. His 15-year-old son also died from leukaemia at that time, leading him to seek a different working challenge as a distraction from the grief in his personal life.

=== Barcelona ===
In 1981, Lattek was appointed successor to Helenio Herrera at Spanish club Barcelona. He led the club to the European Cup Winners' Cup in 1982, defeating Standard Liège 2–1 in the final. He is the only coach to lead three clubs to three different major European trophies. On the field Barcelona was led by Migueli, Alexanco, Rexach, Asensi, Quini, the German Bernd Schuster, and the Dane, Allan Simonsen, Lattek's star signing from his old club, Mönchengladbach. In the second season Diego Maradona, then 22 years of age, was signed for a record transfer fee. However Barcelona did not win any domestic titles that year, and Lattek was replaced at the end of the 1982–83 season by the World Cup winning Argentine coach, César Luis Menotti, who it was hoped would bring out the best in Maradona.

=== Return to Bayern Munich ===
Lattek got his next managerial appointment from his former player Uli Hoeneß, who was by then in charge as commercial manager with his old side, Bayern Munich. Lattek succeeded the Hungarian coach Pal Csernai. In the next few years he won another league championship hat-trick with the club and two more national cups, the 'double" in 1986 being the fourth in German football history. However Bayern lost the 1987 European Champions Cup final 2–1 to FC Porto. Great players during his second stint with Bayern included Karl-Heinz Rummenigge, Lothar Matthäus, Klaus Augenthaler, Dieter Hoeneß, the Danish midfielder Søren Lerby and the Belgian national goalkeeper Jean-Marie Pfaff. As it had been with Borussia Mönchengladbach, his former player Jupp Heynckes followed him as coach here, too.

=== Cologne and Schalke ===
After the heady days at Bayern, Lattek retired for a few years. In 1991, he joined 1. FC Köln as Sporting Director and was head coach for one match as coach, where he achieved a home draw against Bayern. The rest of the season he spent with the club as technical manager. 1992 he returned once more to the dugout and led Schalke 04 through the first half of the season. His last match in Munich was a 1–1 draw against Bayern.

=== Return to Borussia Dortmund ===
Lattek officially retired and took up a role as TV commentator and newspaper columnist with the national broadsheet Die Welt and the bi-weekly sports magazine Kicker. He was tempted out of retirement by his old team, Borussia Dortmund. The club had won the 1997 Champions League title, but was in panic mode towards the end of the 1999–2000 season, just one point above the relegation zone with five matches left to play. For what is speculated to be an extremely lucrative sum, as much as 250,000 Euros, the then 65-year-old Lattek took on the role of savior. His magic did the trick, two wins, two draws and only one defeat – against Bayern Munich – were enough to keep the club in the league. His last match was a 3–0 away triumph against Hertha BSC in front of a crowd of 75,000. At Dortmund he left a working base for his successor Matthias Sammer, who two years later at the age of 34 became the youngest coach to manage a German team to the league championship.

== Later life ==
Lattek retired having won 14 major trophies. He still holds the record for having managed teams to the most Bundesliga titles, six with Bayern Munich and two with Borussia Mönchengladbach.

He lived in a nursing home in Cologne, where he was known for his continuous fondness of beer ("all great coaches have enjoyed a drink"). In 2012, Lattek suffered a stroke. Lattek later suffered from Parkinson's disease and dementia, and died on 31 January 2015. On the news of his death, Franz Beckenbauer tweeted: "Sad news: The great Udo Lattek is dead. Rest in peace, my friend."

== Coaching record ==
Team	From	To	Record					
Team	From	To	G	W	D	L	Win %	Ref.
Bayern Munich	13 March 1970	2 January 1975	223	137	46	40	61.43	
Borussia Mönchengladbach	1 July 1975	30 June 1979	176	87	48	41	49.43	
Borussia Dortmund	1 July 1979	10 May 1981	72	32	15	25	44.44	
Barcelona	1 July 1981	3 March 1983	76	42	18	16	55.26	
Bayern Munich	1 July 1983	30 June 1987	188	116	45	27	61.70	
1. FC Köln	30 August 1991	4 September 1991	1	0	1	0	0.00	
Schalke 04	1 July 1992	16 January 1993	19	6	6	7	31.58	
Borussia Dortmund	14 April 2000	30 June 2000	5	2	2	1	40.00	
Total			760	422	181	157	55.53	—

== Honours ==
=== Manager ===
Bayern Munich

- Bundesliga: 1971–72, 1972–73, 1973–74, 1984–85, 1985–86, 1986–87
- DFB-Pokal: 1970–71, 1983–84, 1985–86
- European Cup: 1973–74

Borussia Mönchengladbach

- Bundesliga: 1975–76, 1976–77
- UEFA Cup: 1978–79
- German Supercup: 1977

Barcelona

- European Cup Winners' Cup: 1981–82

=== Individual ===
- ESPN 19th-Greatest Manager of All Time: 2013
- France Football 30th Greatest Manager of All Time: 2019
- World Soccer 36th Greatest Manager of All Time: 2013

== See also ==
- List of UEFA club competition winning managers
- List of European Cup and Champions League winning managers
- List of UEFA Cup Winners' Cup winning managers
- List of UEFA Cup winning managers

Awards and achievements
Preceded by Ștefan Kovács	European Cup Winning Coach; 1973–74	Succeeded by Dettmar Cramer
