= August Jäger =

German lawyer and Nazi official (1887–1949)

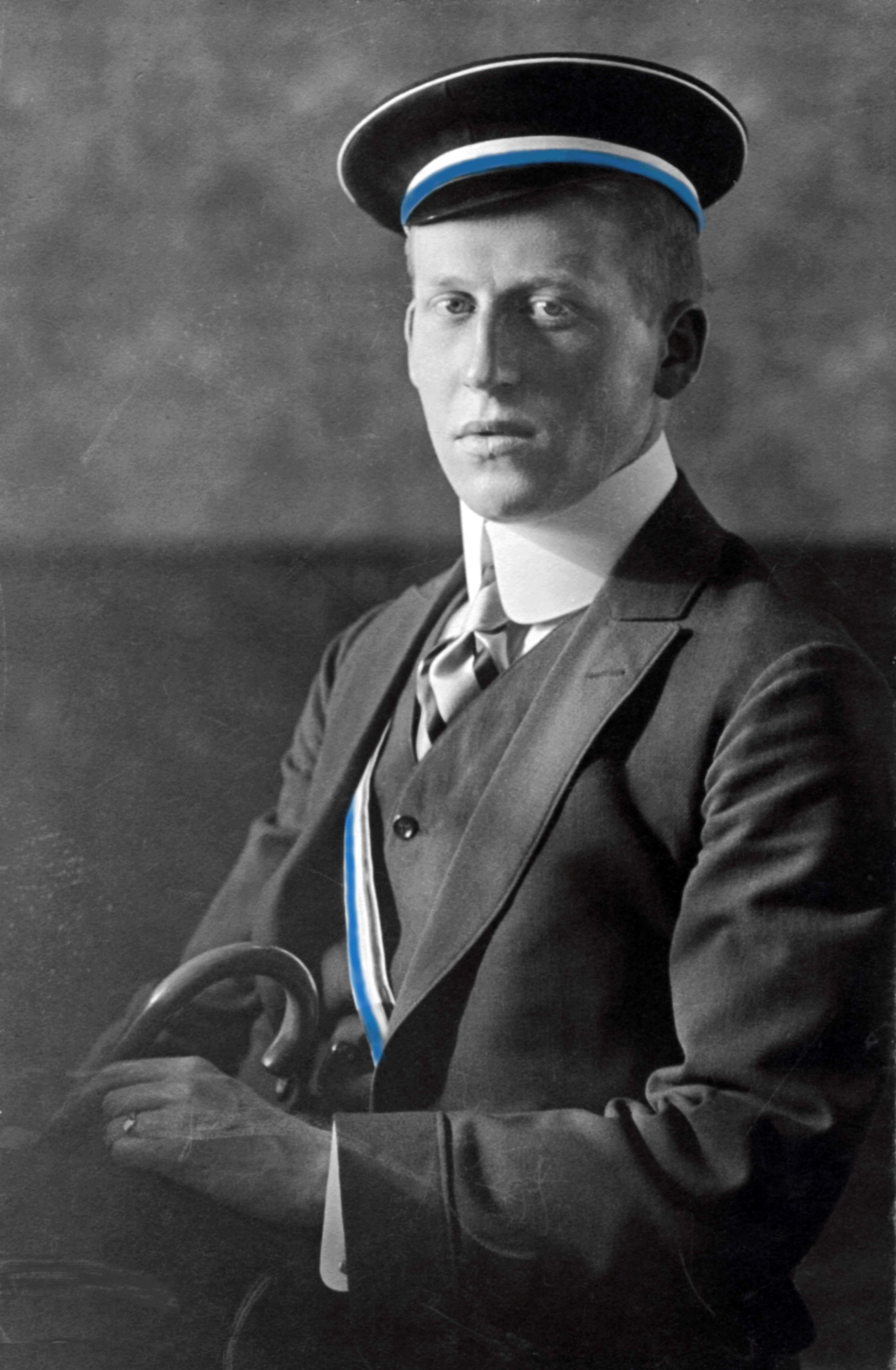
- August Jäger as a German Student Corps member in 1909

Regierungspräsident, Regierungsbezirk Posen
- In office 26 October 1939 – 8 May 1945
- Governor: Arthur Greiser

Ministerialdirektor, Prussian Ministry of Science, Culture and Public Education
- In office May 1933 – 26 October 1934
- Minister: Bernhard Rust

Personal details
- Born: August 21, 1887 Diez, Kingdom of Prussia, German Empire
- Died: June 17, 1949 (aged 61) Poznań, Polish People's Republic
- Cause of death: Execution by hanging
- Party: Nazi Party
- Education: Doctor of Law
- Alma mater: Ludwig-Maximilians-Universität München; Kiel University
- Profession: Lawyer; Judge
- Known for: Persecution of Polish Catholics

Military service
- Allegiance: German Empire
- Branch/service: Imperial German Army
- Years of service: 1914–1918
- Rank: Oberleutnant
- Battles/wars: World War I
- Awards: Iron Cross, 2nd class

August Friedrich Christian Jäger (21 August 1887 – 17 June 1949) was a German lawyer, judge and government official in Nazi Germany. He was also an SA-Brigadeführer in the Nazi Sturmabteilung (SA). During the early years of the regime, he was a leader in the efforts to unify the German Protestant churches under the Nazi leadership principle. During the Second World War, he was the deputy to the Reichsstatthalter in Reichsgau Wartheland and was involved in the persecution of Polish Catholics. At the end of the war, he was extradited to Poland, placed on trial, found guilty of crimes against humanity and hanged.

== Early life ==
Jäger was born in Diez in the Prussian Province of Hesse-Nassau, the son of a Lutheran pastor. He passed his Abitur at the humanistic Gymnasium in Wiesbaden in 1906. He performed compulsory military service as a one-year volunteer in 1906–1907 with the 116th (2nd Grand Ducal Hessian) Infantry Regiment in Giessen. He then began studying law at the Ludwig-Maximilians-Universität München. In 1908, he was accepted into the Corps Suevia München. He transferred to Kiel University and received his Doctor of Law degree, passing his first state law examination in 1911 and beginning a legal clerkship. From 1914 to 1918, he served in the Imperial German Army and took part in the First World War, attaining the rank of Oberleutnant and earning the Iron Cross, 2nd class. Discharged at the end of the war, he passed his second Assessor examination in 1920, worked as a public prosecutor, an Amtsgericht (local court) judge from 1921 and a Landgericht (district court) judge at Wiesbaden from 1926.

== Career in Nazi Germany ==
On 1 March 1933, Jäger joined the Nazi Party (membership number 1,490,118) and the Sturmabteilung (SA), the Party's paramilitary organization. In the Greater Wiesbaden church district, he was the leader of the German Christians. He was also the political director for Protestant church affairs in the Party's Reichsleitung (national leadership). Following the Nazi seizure of power, Jäger was appointed a Ministerialdirektor and head of the church department in the Prussian Ministry of Science, Culture and Public Education in May 1933. He was also designated the Reichskommissar for all Protestant churches in Prussia from 25 June to 15 July 1933.

Jäger led the effort at unification and Nazification of the Evangelical Church in Prussia. In conformance with the Führerprinzip, he dissolved all elected bodies in the Prussian churches and replaced many officials with fellow-German Christians. On 11 April 1934, Jäger was appointed legal advisor to the German Evangelical Church (DEK) by Reich Bishop Ludwig Müller. However, his tactics to force the integration of the state churches of Württemberg and Bavaria failed in the autumn of 1934. He dismissed their bishops and placed them under house arrest, which led to mass public demonstrations that resulted in their reinstatement. Therefore, on 26 October 1934, Jäger was forced to resign from his posts in the DEK and the Prussian ministry. He returned to his legal pursuits and, in 1936, became president of the Senate of the Kammergericht in Berlin.

== Wartime actions in the Warthegau ==
Following the outbreak of the Second World War and the invasion of Poland in September 1939, Jäger was appointed as the deputy to Arthur Greiser, the Chief of Civil Administration in the Warthegau, an area that was annexed to Germany. On 26 October 1939, Jäger was named Regierungspräsident of the newly-established Regierungsbezirk (government district) of Posen and the deputy to Greiser, who had meanwhile risen to the position of Reichsstatthalter (Reich Governor). Jäger attained his highest rank in the SA on 20 May 1944, when he was promoted to SA-Brigadeführer. He earned the nickname "Kirchen-Jäger" (Church hunter) for the vehemence of his hostility to the Catholic Church and his persecution of Polish Catholics. Priests, monks and other church officials were arrested, deported to the General Government, transported to Nazi concentration camps in Germany or shot. Some 1,700 priests were sent to Dachau and over half died there. Historian Richard J. Evans notes that: "By the end of 1941, the Polish Catholic Church had been effectively outlawed in the Wartheland. It was more or less Germanized in the other occupied territories, despite an encyclical issued by the Pope as early as 27 October 1939 protesting against this persecution."

Shortly after Germany's surrender in May 1945, Jäger was arrested in Germany by the British occupation authorities and was extradited to Poland on 25 May 1946. There he was tried in 1948, sentenced to death on 13 December and executed by hanging on 17 June 1949 in Poznań.

== Sources ==
- Das Deutsche Führerlexikon 1934-1935. Berlin: Verlagsanftalt Otto Stollberg G. m. b. H. 1934.
- Evans, Richard J. (2005). The Third Reich in Power. New York: Penguin Press. ISBN 978-0-143-03790-3.
- Evans, Richard J. (2009). The Third Reich at War. New York: Penguin Press. ISBN 978-1-594-20206-3.
- Jäger, August Friedrich Christian entry in the Saarland Biografien
- Klee, Ernst (2007). Das Personenlexikon zum Dritten Reich. Wer war was vor und nach 1945. Frankfurt-am-Main: Fischer-Taschenbuch-Verlag. ISBN 978-3-596-16048-8.
- Mazower, Mark (2008). Hitler's Empire: How the Nazis Ruled Europe. New York: The Penguin Press. ISBN 978-1-594-20188-2.
