= September 1935 =

Month of 1935

<<	September 1935					>>
Su	Mo	Tu	We	Th	Fr	Sa
1	2	3	4	5	6	7
8	9	10	11	12	13	14
15	16	17	18	19	20	21
22	23	24	25	26	27	28
29	30

The following events occurred in September 1935:

== September 1, 1935 (Sunday) ==
- A pastoral letter was read in every Catholic church in Germany defying the Nazi regime. "If the laws of the state are in contradiction to those of the nation and to God's commandments, then God's word must be heeded by the faithful", the letter read in part. "There is lots of talk in official Germany against 'political Catholicism', but there is little talk of politicians who interfere in church matters. There is a danger that the slogan 'political Catholicism' will make some official elements believe they can do as they please, forbidding processions and the ringing of church bells, and arresting nuns and monks without legal investigations. This is in open contradiction to the concordat."
- Born: Seiji Ozawa, conductor, in Mukden, Manchukuo (d. 2024)

== September 2, 1935 (Monday) ==
- The Labor Day hurricane struck the Florida Keys. More than 200 veterans housed in a work camp were killed.
- Abyssinia Crisis: Emperor Haile Selassie began issuing gas masks to his people in anticipation of a possible chemical attack by Italian forces.
- A German film version of the George Bernard Shaw play Pygmalion premiered in Berlin.
- Born: D. Wayne Lukas, horse trainer, in Antigo, Wisconsin (d. 2025); Guy Rodgers, basketball player, in Philadelphia, Pennsylvania (d. 2001)

== September 3, 1935 (Tuesday) ==
- Sir Malcolm Campbell became the first person to drive an automobile 300 miles per hour, establishing a new record land speed of 301.337 mph at the Bonneville Salt Flats in Utah.
- An arbitration tribunal found that neither Italy nor Ethiopia were to blame for the Walwal Incident because both sides considered the disputed territory to be within their borders.
- Funeral: Astrid of Sweden, Queen consort of the Belgians

== September 4, 1935 (Wednesday) ==
- The 1935 Labor Day hurricane, the most intense in history, made landfall at Cedar Key, Florida. It would kill a total of more than 400 people by the time it dissipated in the North Atlantic on September 10.
- The Italian delegation at the League of Nations demanded that Ethiopia be expelled from the organization, claiming it was "a state incapable of controlling itself or the people subject to it." The chief Italian delegate told the international press that the members of the League council would have to decide whether they wanted to expel Ethiopia or Italy.

== September 5, 1935 (Thursday) ==
- Ten members of the French Air Force were killed during military maneuvers when two bomber planes collided in low-visibility weather.
- President Roosevelt ordered an investigation into why adequate precautions were not taken to protect the veterans in work relief camps from the hurricane.

== September 6, 1935 (Friday) ==
- Italy accepted the appointment of a five-power committee (consisting of France, Britain, Spain, Turkey and Poland) to arbitrate in the Abyssinia Crisis.
- New York judge Louis B. Brodsky dismissed charges against five of the six persons arrested in the July 26 Bremen incident. Brodsky likened the Nazi swastika to "the black flag of piracy" and called the Nazi regime "a revolt against civilization."

== September 7, 1935 (Saturday) ==
- Germany made a formal protest to the United States over Judge Brodsky's remarks.
- Pope Pius XI celebrated the first Mass by a pope in St. Paul's Basilica in 175 years for a convention of World War veterans. The pope reiterated his hopes for peace.
- Miss Pittsburgh Henrietta Leaver was crowned Miss America 1935.
- Born: Abdou Diouf, politician, in Louga, French West Africa

== September 8, 1935 (Sunday) ==
- Senator Huey Long was shot in the Louisiana State Capitol. Long's bodyguards shot dead his assailant, Dr. Carl Weiss.
- Hans Stuck won the Italian Grand Prix.
- Died: Tokonami Takejirō, 69, Japanese politician and statesman; Carl Weiss, 28, physician and assassin of Huey Long (shot)

== September 9, 1935 (Monday) ==
- President Roosevelt released a statement condemning the shooting of Huey Long. "The spirit of violence is un-American and has no place in a consideration of public affairs, least of all at a time when calm and dispassionate approach to the difficult problems of the day is so essential", the statement read.
- Born: Chaim Topol, actor, singer, writer and producer, in Tel Aviv, British Mandate of Palestine (d. 2023)

== September 10, 1935 (Tuesday) ==
- Huey Long died at 6:06 a.m. Eastern Time. Doctors had tried to save him by performing an operation and five blood transfusions, to no avail.
- The five-power arbitration committee in the Abyssinia Crisis concluded that any further negotiations were pointless.
- Riots broke out in Athens as the Greek parliament debated restoring the monarchy.
- Nazi Germany's 7th Party Congress began in Nuremberg.
- Nazi Culture Minister Bernhard Rust issued a decree stating that beginning in the spring of 1936, complete racial segregation of German schools must be enforced.
- Died: Huey Long, 42, American politician (assassinated)

== September 11, 1935 (Wednesday) ==
- British Foreign Secretary Samuel Hoare spoke before the League of Nations Assembly, affirming Britain's dedication to the League but asserting that it was conditional on its fellow members doing their share.
- In Nuremberg, Adolf Hitler laid the foundation stone for the construction of a new Congress Hall that would accommodate 60,000 people. This building was never completed.
- Born: Arvo Pärt, composer, in Paide, Estonia; Gherman Titov, cosmonaut, in Kosikhinsky District, USSR (d. 2000)
- Died: Evelyn Hoey, 24, American torch singer and actress (shot; ruled suicide); Charles Norris, 67, American medical examiner

== September 12, 1935 (Thursday) ==
- U.S. officials announced with effect from October 15, Germany would lose all tariff reductions granted in reciprocal trade pacts, due to various discriminations against American imports in Germany.
- Viscount Cecil called Hoare's speech "the best made by a British foreign minister at Geneva since the creation of the League." Haile Selassie called the speech "a wonderful New Year's present", saying "The tide seems to have turned."

== September 13, 1935 (Friday) ==
- Howard Hughes set a new air speed record, reaching 352.39 mph in his new Hughes H-1 Racer over a fixed course near Santa Ana, California.
- Pierre Laval spoke before the League of Nations, echoing many of Hoare's statements by proclaiming France's commitment to the League Covenant. Separately, French government officials said they would implement economic sanctions against Italy the moment it invaded Ethiopia.
- Haile Selassie made a plea for peace in a radio address transmitted around the world.

== September 14, 1935 (Saturday) ==
- Italy declared that no compromise in the Abyssinia Crisis was possible and announced it was considering withdrawal from the League of Nations if the organization interfered with its objective.
- U.S. Secretary of State Cordell Hull expressed "regrets" to the German ambassador for Judge Brodsky's remarks.
- Hitler addressed 50,000 Hitler Youth assembled at the Nuremberg Rally. "Never forget, friendship will be accorded only to the strong, as the strong alone deserve friendship. I make youth responsible to help me make Germany strong", Hitler told the gathering. "We do not believe in ludicrous, talkative democracy. We are not a chicken farm where everybody runs helter skelter and everybody cackles. We learn to obey one will, and act in accordance with that will."
- Born: Fujio Akatsuka, manga artist, in Tokyo, Japan (d. 2008)

== September 15, 1935 (Sunday) ==
- In Nuremberg, the Reichstag convened for a special session and passed the Nuremberg Laws. Marriage between Jews and Aryans was forbidden and three new classes of German citizenship were created that excluded Jews.
- The swastika flag was made the official flag of Germany.
- Senate elections were held in Poland. The Nonpartisan Bloc for Cooperation with the Government won 181 of 206 seats.
- The musical comedy film The Big Broadcast of 1936 featuring an all-star cast including Bing Crosby, George Burns, Gracie Allen and Ethel Merman was released.

== September 16, 1935 (Monday) ==
- Small Montana won the world flyweight boxing title with a win over Midget Wolgast in Oakland, California.
- Hitler conducted a review of the Wehrmacht on the final day of the Nuremberg Rally.
- Born:
  - Carl Andre, minimalist artist, in Quincy, Massachusetts (d. 2024)
  - Bob Kiley, public transit planner and supervisor, in Minneapolis, Minnesota (d. 2016)
  - Esther Vilar, Argentine-German writer known for The Manipulated Man, in Buenos Aires
  - Raʼno Abdullayeva, Uzbek historian, in Shofirkon District, Bukhara Oblast, Uzbek SSR, USSR (d. 2025)

== September 17, 1935 (Tuesday) ==
- The Philippine Presidential elections were held. Manuel L. Quezon was elected the 1st President of the Commonwealth of the Philippines.
- Britain amassed fifteen warships at Gibraltar as a precaution against Italy.
- Brooklyn Dodgers outfielder Len Koenecke got into a fight while flying in a private airplane over Toronto after drinking heavily. He was hit in the head with a fire extinguisher and killed.
- Born: Ken Kesey, author, in La Junta, Colorado (d. 2001); Serge Klarsfeld, Nazi hunter, in Bucharest, Romania
- Died: Len Koenecke, 31, American baseball player (cerebral hemorrhage)

== September 18, 1935 (Wednesday) ==
- Benito Mussolini rejected the League's latest peace offering of Danakil and Ogaden, scoffing that he had been taken for "a collector of deserts."
- Born: John Spencer, snooker player, in Radcliffe, Greater Manchester, England (d. 2006)

== September 19, 1935 (Thursday) ==
- Jewish leader Rabbi Stephen Samuel Wise sent an appeal to the League of Nations to stop Germany's persecution of Jews. "The struggle against the anti-Jewish policy of the Third Reich is a task incumbent upon humanity, whose future is menaced in the increasingly threatening tendencies displayed by this policy", the appeal read. "The Jewish people will pursue with inflexible determination the struggle which has been thrust upon them in the unfailing hope that all people who prize liberty and justice, and in particular the states which are members of the League, will stand by it in its defense of the fundamental principles of humanity."
- The EMLL 2nd Anniversary Show, commemorating the second anniversary of the professional wrestling promotion Empresa Mexicana de la Lucha Libre, was held in Mexico City.
- The stage revue At Home Abroad premiered at the Winter Garden Theatre on Broadway.

== September 20, 1935 (Friday) ==
- Berlin newspapers published photos of five new U-boats, Germany's first public admission that it possessed any.
- Died: Julio Nalundasan, 41, Filipino politician (assassinated)

== September 21, 1935 (Saturday) ==
- The Detroit Tigers clinched the American League pennant by sweeping a doubleheader from the St. Louis Browns, 6–2 and 2–0.
- The musical comedy Jubilee with book by Moss Hart and music and lyrics by Cole Porter premiered at the Shubert Theatre in Boston.

== September 22, 1935 (Sunday) ==
- Mussolini named his terms for settlement of the Abyssinia Crisis, demanding a huge eastern swath of Ethiopia's territory and for its army to be reduced by half, with the other half put under control of Italian officers.
- The Red Army reintroduced military ranks that had been abolished after the October Revolution of 1917.
- Rudolf Caracciola of Germany won the Spanish Grand Prix.

== September 23, 1935 (Monday) ==
- British delegates told the five-power committee at the League of Nations that Italy's conditions were unacceptable.
- 200,000 Italian soldiers born between 1911 and 1914 were mobilized, bringing Italy's total army to the 1 million Mussolini had promised by October 1.
- The first two known victims of the Cleveland Torso Murderer were found.
- Born: Prem Chopra, film actor, in Lahore, Punjab, British India
- Died: DeWolf Hopper, 77, American stage performer and theatre producer

== September 24, 1935 (Tuesday) ==
- Joe Louis established himself as the number one challenger for boxing's world heavyweight title by knocking out Max Baer in the fourth round of a bout at Yankee Stadium in New York.
- The five-power committee drafted a report admitting its efforts at mediation in the Abyssinia Crisis had failed and turned the matter back over to the League.

== September 25, 1935 (Wednesday) ==
- Nazi Germany founded the Reichsinstitut für Geschichte des neuen Deutschlands (Reich Institute for the History of the New Germany) and named Walter Frank as its head.
- A large fire broke out at a wharfside warehouse in the Wapping district of London. It would take four days for firefighters to put it out.
- Born: Adrien Douady, mathematician, in La Tronche, France (d. 2006)

== September 26, 1935 (Thursday) ==
- The League of Nations informed Italy and Ethiopia that they could not start war before December 4 without violating the League Covenant and becoming subject to punishment by its other members.
- The Soviet Union ended rationing of staple foods such as meat and fish.
- The 4th Fleet (Imperial Japanese Navy) had many warships damaged and 54 sailors killed by a typhoon.
- Died: Iván Persa, 75, Hungarian Slovene Roman Catholic priest and writer

== September 27, 1935 (Friday) ==
- The Chicago Cubs won the National League pennant with a 6–2 victory over the St. Louis Cardinals. The Cubs also won the second game of their doubleheader 5–3 to run their consecutive game winning streak to 21 games. This winning streak is tied for second-longest in major league history, but it's the longest in history to be uninterrupted by a tie.

== September 28, 1935 (Saturday) ==
- The Cuba hurricane made landfall in Camagüey Province.
- The Cubs' 21-game winning streak was snapped by the Cardinals by a score of 7–5.
- Born: Ronald Lacey, actor, in London Borough of Harrow, England (d. 1991)
- Died: William Kennedy Dickson, 75, Scottish inventor

== September 29, 1935 (Sunday) ==
- The variety radio show The Magic Key of RCA premiered on the NBC Blue Network.
- Rabbit Maranville of the Boston Braves played his final major league game, going 0-for-4 against the New York Giants.
- Earle Combs of the New York Yankees appeared in his final major league game, appearing as a pinch runner.
- Born:
  - Jerry Lee Lewis, American rock and roll musician, in Ferriday, Louisiana (d. 2022)
  - Mylène Demongeot, French actress and model, in Nice (d. 2022)

== September 30, 1935 (Monday) ==
- President Roosevelt attended the official dedication of Boulder Dam. "The transformation wrought here is a 20th century marvel", Roosevelt declared in a speech.
- The Holland America liner SS Rotterdam ran aground near Kingston, Jamaica. The British steamer Ariguani was dispatched to rescue the 976 aboard.
- Two days of Landtag voting concluded in Memel. The elections were the subject of fierce controversy between Lithuania and Germany because of questions over the rights of the ethnic German minority.
- The George Gershwin opera Porgy and Bess was performed for the first time at the Colonial Theatre in Boston.
- Born: Z. Z. Hill, blues singer, in Naples, Texas (d. 1984); Johnny Mathis, singer, in Gilmer, Texas
