= July 1935 =

Month of 1935

<<	July 1935					>>
Su	Mo	Tu	We	Th	Fr	Sa
	1	2	3	4	5	6
7	8	9	10	11	12	13
14	15	16	17	18	19	20
21	22	23	24	25	26	27
28	29	30	31

The following events occurred in July 1935:

== July 1, 1935 (Monday) ==
- A League of Nations-sponsored conference began in Buenos Aires to negotiate a peace treaty to end the Chaco War.
- Anthony Eden gave his report to the House of Commons on the failed Rome conference with Mussolini. Eden revealed that Mussolini turned down an offer to let Ethiopia have a seaport in the British Somaliland in exchange for territorial and economic concessions from Ethiopia to Italy.
- Participants in the On-to-Ottawa Trek clashed with police in Regina, Saskatchewan, resulting in the death of 1 officer, 45 injuries and 130 arrests. It was the worst riot in Canada during the Great Depression. The trek ended, but the reputation of Prime Minister R. B. Bennett suffered.
- Born: David Prowse, actor, in Bristol, England (d. 2020)

== July 2, 1935 (Tuesday) ==
- Switzerland banned the Nazi newspapers Der Stürmer, Der Allemanne and Der Reichsdeutsche in retaliation for Germany's ban of the Swiss paper Baseler Nachrichten.
- The Rip Van Winkle Bridge opened between Hudson, New York and Catskill, New York.
- Died: Hank O'Day, 75, American baseball player, umpire and manager

== July 3, 1935 (Wednesday) ==
- The Polish ocean liner MS Batory was launched.
- Died: André Citroën, 57, French engineer and industrialist

== July 4, 1935 (Thursday) ==
- Ethiopia appealed to the United States to study means of persuading Italy to abandon its warlike actions and respect the Kellogg–Briand Pact. American public disapproval of Italy's methods, Ethiopia hoped, would help turn sufficient world opinion against Italy to prevent it from starting a war.
- The first Belisha beacon became operational, in Wigan, England.
- Died: Archduke Leopold Ferdinand of Austria, 66

== July 5, 1935 (Friday) ==
- The United States delivered a curt reply to Ethiopia's request, saying the mediation being conducted by the League of Nations still had a chance to reach a satisfactory conclusion.
- Nazi Germany passed a new law making draft dodging liable to six months imprisonment and fines. The government also increased the penalties for "homosexual offenses" to up to 10 years in prison.
- Fred Perry of the United Kingdom defeated Gottfried von Cramm of Germany in the Gentlemen's Singles Final at Wimbledon.
- The Parliament of Canada established the Canadian Wheat Board.
- Two days after being released by the Chicago Cubs, outfielder Kiki Cuyler signed as a free agent with the Cincinnati Reds.

== July 6, 1935 (Saturday) ==
- U.S. President Franklin D. Roosevelt signed the National Labor Relations Act, guaranteeing the rights of private sector employees to organize into trade unions.
- Elisabeth of Romania obtained a divorce from the former King George II of Greece.
- Helen Wills Moody defeated fellow American Helen Jacobs in the Ladies' Singles Final at Wimbledon.
- The wireless antenna of Benito Mussolini's plane was struck by lightning as it landed in Salerno, but Mussolini was unharmed. There he made a speech from atop a cannon, declaring, "We have decided on a struggle in which we as a government and a people will not turn back. The decision is irretrievable."
- The American Legion told all U.S. citizens to leave Ethiopia.
- Born: Tenzin Gyatso, the 14th Dalai Lama and Nobel laureate, in Amdo, Tibet

== July 7, 1935 (Sunday) ==
- The Chinese city of Changde was flooded in ten-foot deep water when dikes on the Yuan River collapsed.
- The first Iberian Cup was played. Porto defeated Real Betis 4-2. The match was not officially recognized and another Iberian Cup was not played until 1983.
- Died: George Keller, 92, Irish-born American architect and engineer; Virginia Fair Vanderbilt, 60, American socialite, hotelier and philanthropist

== July 8, 1935 (Monday) ==
- 37 died in flooding in New York State.
- The Reich Ministry of Education decreed that all students were required to prove they were of "Aryan descent" before admission to German universities.
- The third Major League Baseball All-Star Game was played at Cleveland Stadium in Cleveland, Ohio. The American League defeated the National League 4-1.
- Born: Vitaly Sevastyanov, cosmonaut, in Krasnouralsk, USSR (d. 2010)

== July 9, 1935 (Tuesday) ==
- The Central Committee of the Communist Party of the Soviet Union decided on a ten-year plan to expand the urban area of Moscow from 32,000 hectares to 60,000.
- Excavators of the Moscow subway announced the discovery of underground dungeons, including a torture chamber, dating from the reign of Ivan the Terrible.
- Born: Wim Duisenberg, economist and politician, in Heerenveen, Netherlands (d. 2005); Mercedes Sosa, singer, in San Miguel de Tucumán, Argentina (d. 2009); Mighty Sparrow, calypso singer and guitarist, in Grand Roy, Grenada

== July 10, 1935 (Wednesday) ==
- Polish President Ignacy Mościcki dissolved parliament and called new elections.
- The Bell Helicopter company was founded.
- Died: Paul Hines, 80, American baseball player

== July 11, 1935 (Thursday) ==
- Romania and Turkey agreed on a repatriation plan that would allow 10,000 Muslims in Romania to return to Turkey over the next ten years.
- The United States Census Bureau revealed that America's birth rate increased in 1934 after ten straight years of decline.
- Born: Oliver Napier, politician, in Belfast, Northern Ireland (d. 2011)

== July 12, 1935 (Friday) ==
- Belgium diplomatically recognized the Soviet Union.
- Seven were killed in Belfast during clashes between members of the Orange Order and Irish nationalists.
- The crime-drama film The Murder Man starring Spencer Tracy and Virginia Bruce was released.
- The Merian C. Cooper-produced and Irving Pichel-directed fantasy adventure film She was released.
- Died: Alfred Dreyfus, 75, French artillery officer and central figure of the Dreyfus Affair

== July 13, 1935 (Saturday) ==
- Near Linz, Austrian Chancellor Kurt Schuschnigg was injured in an auto accident that killed his wife. Ernst Rüdiger Starhemberg was made acting chancellor while Schuschnigg recovered.
- Much of Austria's Habsburg Law was lifted, including the provision that banned certain Hapsburgs from entering the country.
- The United States and the Soviet Union signed a $30 million economic pact.
- Doc Cramer of the Philadelphia Athletics went 6-for-6 in a game. Since he'd also had a six-hit game on June 20, 1932, Cramer became the first player in American League history to ever accomplish the feat twice.
- Born: Jack Kemp, politician and football player, in Los Angeles (d. 2009); Kurt Westergaard, cartoonist, in Døstrup, Denmark (d. 2021)

== July 14, 1935 (Sunday) ==
- On Bastille Day, France's leftist parties united in a common Popular Front to combat the rise of fascism in the country.
- Rudolf Caracciola of Germany won the Belgian Grand Prix.

== July 15, 1935 (Monday) ==
- Nazis attacked Jews along the Kurfürstendamm in Berlin.
- A mining disaster in Lengede, Germany killed 10 and injured 30.
- The Vatican newspaper L'Osservatore Romano strongly attacked Nazi Germany for failing to uphold the Reichskonkordat with the Catholic church.
- Born: William G. Stewart, television producer and director, in Habrough, England (d. 2017).

== July 16, 1935 (Tuesday) ==
- King George V observed a fleet review, the largest since before the Great War, at Spithead.
- The world's first parking meter was installed in Oklahoma City.

== July 17, 1935 (Wednesday) ==
- Buster Keaton's wife Mae filed for divorce and separately sued his mistress for $200,000.
- This is the cover date of the famous Variety magazine headline, "STIX NIX HICK PIX".
- Born:
  - Peter Schickele, American composer and parodist, in Ames, Iowa (d. 2024)
  - Donald Sutherland, Canadian actor, in Saint John, New Brunswick, Canada (d. 2024)
- Died:
  - James Moore, 86, English bicycle racer
  - George William Russell, 68, Irish writer and nationalist
  - Cudjoe Lewis the last known surviving victim of the Clotilda (slave ship), the last ship of the Atlantic Slave Trade

== July 18, 1935 (Thursday) ==
- Ethiopian emperor Haile Selassie made a speech before the Ethiopian parliament calling all his people to prepare for war. "Italy is provided with all the modern methods of warfare", Selassie said. "Ethiopia is a poor country, but we shall show the world how a united people can fight to preserve its independence. Should a peaceful solution not be found, Ethiopia, stretching her hands to God, will struggle to the last man, but – right up to the last minute – we shall persist in our efforts for peace."
- Hermann Göring issued a manifesto ordering legal authorities to take action against any priests that engage in "political Catholicism" against the Nazi state. "If the Catholic movements do not fundamentally change their attitude, they will be regarded as political organizations and will be forbidden", Göring warned.
- Born: Jayendra Saraswathi, Hindu religious leader, in Kanchipuram, Tamil Nadu (d. 2018)

== July 19, 1935 (Friday) ==
- An African-American man accused of attacking a white woman was lynched by a white mob in Fort Lauderdale, Florida.
- Wolf-Heinrich Graf von Helldorf was made Berlin's chief of police.
- Crowds in the Place de l'Opéra in Paris fought thousands of police and guards during demonstrations against nationwide pay reductions.

== July 20, 1935 (Saturday) ==
- A KLM passenger plane en route from Milan to Amsterdam crashed in Switzerland, killing all 13 aboard.
- The dramatic radio program G-Men premiered on NBC Radio. On January 15, 1936 it moved to CBS and changed its name to Gang Busters.

== July 21, 1935 (Sunday) ==
- Ten died in India when troops opened fire on rioting Muslims.
- Priests in Freiburg, Baden defied Göring's edict by accusing the government of violating the concordat with the Vatican.
- Born: Moe Drabowsky, baseball player, in Ozanna, Poland (d. 2006)

== July 22, 1935 (Monday) ==
- In response to a general strike, Indiana Governor Paul V. McNutt declared martial law in Vigo County and dispatched over 1,000 National Guardsmen to the area.
- Wilhelm Frick issued a decree ordering the governments of German states to suppress religious youth groups. No members of such groups were allowed to wear uniforms, display banners in public spaces or partake in exercises or sports of a quasi-military nature.
- Died: William Mulholland, 79, American civil engineer

== July 23, 1935 (Tuesday) ==
- A confrontation in Terre Haute, Indiana between 600 soldiers and 2,000 union sympathizers resulted in the use of tear gas, 185 arrests and numerous injuries.
- Hermann Göring ordered the dissolution of the Catholic War Veteran's League of Prussia.

== July 24, 1935 (Wednesday) ==
- New York City Mayor Fiorello H. La Guardia announced that he was denying a masseur's license to a German citizen in response to incidents of discrimination against American Jews in Germany.
- Born: Pat Oliphant, editorial cartoonist, in Adelaide, Australia; Les Reed, songwriter and musician, in Woking, Surrey, England (d. 2019)

== July 25, 1935 (Thursday) ==
- British Foreign Secretary Samuel Hoare announced that the government would not allow British manufacturers to export war materiel to either Ethiopia or Italy until all efforts to resolve the Abyssinia Crisis were exhausted. Since Italy had no need to buy foreign weapons, the embargo only affected Ethiopia.
- All Jewish tourists were driven out of the German seaside resort town of Misdroy.
- Heavy rains left 70% of the Chinese province of Hubei flooded.
- Yugoslavia and the Vatican signed a concordat placing the Catholic Church on an equal basis with Eastern Orthodoxy.
- Born: Barbara Harris, stage performer and actress, in Evanston, Illinois (d. 2018); Larry Sherry, baseball player, in Los Angeles (d. 2006)

== July 26, 1935 (Friday) ==
- At New York Harbor, hundreds of communist demonstrators stormed the SS Bremen, tore the Nazi swastika flag from the foremast and threw it into the Hudson River.
- A staff member of the office of German sports commissioner Hans von Tschammer und Osten said that no Jews would represent Germany at next year's Berlin Olympics. The official claimed that Jews had competed in the qualifying events but none made the cut. In November Germany would give in somewhat to mounting international pressure and allow the half-Jewish fencer Helene Mayer onto the team.
- Der Stahlhelm were dissolved in Prussia.
- The musical film Curly Top was released.

== July 27, 1935 (Saturday) ==
- Germany announced that its commercial trade agreement with the United States was terminated due to Mayor La Guardia's actions. Germany also demanded that the United States apologize for the Bremen incident.
- A munitions factory in Taino, Lombardy, Italy exploded, killing 33.
- The Federal Writers' Project was established in the United States.
- Born: Billy McCullough, footballer, in Carrickfergus, Northern Ireland; Sarah Jane Sands, baseball player, in Orangeville, Pennsylvania

== July 28, 1935 (Sunday) ==
- Romain Maes of Belgium won the Tour de France.
- Tazio Nuvolari of Italy won the German Grand Prix.
- Born: Simon Dee, television and radio presenter, in Manchester, England (d. 2009)

== July 29, 1935 (Monday) ==
- The FBI National Academy was started.
- Born: Billy Harris, ice hockey player, in Toronto, Canada (d. 2001); Peter Schreier, tenor and conductor, in Meissen, Germany (d. 2019)
- Died: François Denys Légitime, 93, Haitian general and 16th President of Haiti; Walter Williams, 71, American journalist and educator

== July 30, 1935 (Tuesday) ==
- The first ten Penguin Books went on sale in Britain. Paperbacks up to this time were associated with a lack of quality in both their bindings and contents, but Penguin became the first to offer good quality literature in the format.

== July 31, 1935 (Wednesday) ==
- A newspaper printer in Lörrach, Germany was sentenced to seven months in prison for a mistake. The phrase "Heil Hitler" ("Hail Hitler") was misspelled as "Heilt Hitler" ("Cure Hitler").
- Born: Mort Crim, broadcast journalist, in the United States
- Died: Frederick H. Gillett, 83, American politician; Gustav Lindenthal, 85, American civil engineer
