= Louis Brodsky =

Louis Brodsky may refer to:

- Louis Daniel Brodsky (1941–2014), American poet, short story writer, and Faulkner scholar
- Louis B. Brodsky (1883–1970), magistrate in The Tombs court in New York City
