= June 1935 =

Month of 1935

<<	June 1935					>>
Su	Mo	Tu	We	Th	Fr	Sa
						1
2	3	4	5	6	7	8
9	10	11	12	13	14	15
16	17	18	19	20	21	22
23	24	25	26	27	28	29
30

The following events occurred in June 1935:

== June 1, 1935 (Saturday) ==
- Fernand Bouisson became caretaker Prime Minister of France; his tenure lasted only a week.
- Britain introduced mandatory driving tests.

== June 2, 1935 (Sunday) ==
- Babe Ruth quit the Boston Braves after an argument with team owner Emil Fuchs. Ruth wanted to attend an arrival party for the Normandie since he couldn't play anyway due to a knee injury, but Fuchs refused to give him a day off. Ruth said in his initial statement that he was retiring, but he then said he was merely taking a "60 day vacation" and would consider offers from any other teams made afterward. However, no offers would be made.
- Uruguayan President Gabriel Terra was shot by a former deputy from a rival party, Bernando Garcia, while visiting a race course. Although Garcia fired from close range, a bystander bumped his arm as he fired and the bullet merely grazed the president's leg. Garcia was swiftly arrested.
- Born: Roger Brierley, actor, in Stockport, Cheshire, England (d. 2005); Dimitri Kitsikis, Turkologist, in Athens, Greece (d. 2021); Carol Shields, American-born Canadian author, in Oak Park, Illinois (d. 2003)
- Died: Vasıf Çınar, Turkish educator, politician, journalist and diplomat (b. 1895)

== June 3, 1935 (Monday) ==
- The Normandie took the Blue Riband upon completion of its maiden voyage from France to New York in a record 4 days, 11 hours 33 minutes – 3 hours faster than the old record. At one point the ship attained a sustained speed of 31.89 knots, also a record for an ocean liner.
- 400 people in Mexico died in flooding.
- The On-to-Ottawa Trek by thousands of unemployed men began in Western Canada.

== June 4, 1935 (Tuesday) ==
- Bouisson's cabinet fell when the French Chamber of Deputies voted down his request for emergency powers to save the devalued franc – the same issue that brought down Pierre-Étienne Flandin five days earlier.

== June 5, 1935 (Wednesday) ==
- The Swiss government introduced a significant armament expansion program.
- Bahram won The Derby.
- The German Propaganda Ministry ordered newspapers to make no mention of the expatriated writer Thomas Mann's 60th birthday tomorrow.

== June 6, 1935 (Thursday) ==
- The Judicial Committee of the Privy Council rendered a decision that ended British jurisdiction over courts in the Irish Free State and the Empire's Dominions.
- The Alfred Hitchcock-directed suspense film The 39 Steps premiered at the New Gallery Theatre in London.
- Died: Julian Byng, 1st Viscount Byng of Vimy, 72, British army officer and 12th Governor General of Canada; George Grossmith, Jr., 61, British actor and theatre producer

== June 7, 1935 (Friday) ==
- Stanley Baldwin replaced Ramsay MacDonald as Prime Minister of the United Kingdom. In less than an hour Baldwin produced a new cabinet which included Samuel Hoare as the new Foreign Secretary and Viscount Halifax as Secretary of State for War.
- Pierre Laval became Prime Minister of France for the second time. The French Chamber of Deputies voted to grant the Laval government emergency powers to handle the crisis of the franc's devaluation.

== June 8, 1935 (Saturday) ==
- Omaha won the Belmont Stakes and became the third horse to complete the Triple Crown of Thoroughbred Racing.
- Nazi Germany stripped Bertolt Brecht of his citizenship "for behavior in violation of the obligation of loyalty toward Reich and people."
- Sam Parks, Jr. won the U.S. Open golf tournament.
- In a blunt speech in Cagliari, Benito Mussolini told the British to stay out the Abyssinia Crisis, saying "they never took into consideration world opinion" while creating the British Empire. "we have got old, and we have got new accounts to settle with Ethiopia, and we will settle them", Mussolini declared. "We will pay no attention to what is said in foreign countries. We exclusively are the judges of our own interests and the guarantors of our future."
- Born: George Brunet, baseball player, in Houghton, Michigan (d. 1991)

== June 9, 1935 (Sunday) ==
- Legislative elections were held in Greece. The alliance of the People's Party and National Radical Party won 287 of 300 seats.
- Born: Dutch Savage, professional wrestler, in Scranton, Pennsylvania (d. 2013)

== June 10, 1935 (Monday) ==
- The He–Umezu Agreement was signed in secret between Japan and China.
- American doctor Bob Smith had his last drink – a beer to steady his hands before surgery. As the cofounder of Alcoholics Anonymous, this is considered the official establishment date of the organization.
- Born: Milan Matulović, chess grandmaster, in Belgrade, Yugoslavia (d. 2013)

== June 11, 1935 (Tuesday) ==
- The U.S. Senate passed the Wheeler-Rayburn Public Utility Bill.
- Edward, Prince of Wales made a controversial statement at a British Legion conference when he endorsed an idea that a delegation of German war veterans would be welcomed in Britain and that a delegation of British veterans should visit Germany in return.
- Born: Earlene Brown, athlete, in Latexo, Texas (d. 1983)
- Died: William Wilson Underhill, 95, American businessman

== June 12, 1935 (Wednesday) ==
- An armistice was signed in the Chaco War, effective June 14.
- Louisiana Senator Huey Long began a filibuster against a resolution to extend a watered-down version of the National Recovery Administration.
- Wonderland Greyhound Park opened in Revere, Massachusetts.
- Born: Ian Craig, cricketer, in Yass, New South Wales, Australia (d. 2014)
- Died: Charles Russell Bardeen, 64, American physician and anatomist

== June 13, 1935 (Thursday) ==
- James J. Braddock defeated Max Baer at Madison Square Garden Bowl to win the World Heavyweight Championship of boxing.
- An explosion at a munitions factory in Reinsdorf, Germany killed 60 people and destroyed many houses in the vicinity.
- Senator Long ended his filibuster at 3:40 a.m., 15 hours and 25 minutes after he began.
- Born: Christo and Jeanne-Claude, installation artists, in Gabrovo, Bulgaria and Casablanca, Morocco respectively (Christo died in 2020 and Jeanne-Claude in 2009); Samak Sundaravej, 25th Prime Minister of Thailand, in Bangkok (d. 2009)

== June 14, 1935 (Friday) ==
- The New York Times was banned in Italy for coverage critical of the Fascist regime during the Abyssinia Crisis.
- 42 people were injured and 1 killed in Omaha, Nebraska when police fired on a mob supporting a strike of streetcar employees.
- 18 Communists captured by the government were executed in Shanghai.

== June 15, 1935 (Saturday) ==
- Welwyn Garden City rail crash: 14 were killed and 29 injured when two trains collided at Welwyn Garden City railway station in Hertfordshire, England.
- Martial law was declared in Omaha.
- Italy ordered the recall of all silver currency in the country due to necessity for the metal in its war preparations against Ethiopia.
- The T. S. Eliot play Murder in the Cathedral premiered in the Chapter House of Canterbury Cathedral.
- The suspense film The Glass Key was released.
- Died: Gaar Williams, 54, American cartoonist

== June 16, 1935 (Sunday) ==
- Inventor Edwin Howard Armstrong gave the first public demonstration of frequency modulation (FM) broadcasting in a transmission from Alpine, New Jersey.
- Johnny Hindmarsh and Luis Fontés of the United Kingdom won the 24 Hours of Le Mans endurance race.

== June 17, 1935 (Monday) ==
- Baseball commissioner Kenesaw Mountain Landis allowed the convicted felon Alabama Pitts to play professional baseball for the Albany Senators of the International League.
- Born: Peggy Seeger, folk singer, in New York City

== June 18, 1935 (Tuesday) ==
- The Anglo-German Naval Agreement was signed, allowing Germany to build a navy equal to 35 percent of the tonnage of the Royal Navy. France was angered by the agreement and a rift in Anglo-French relations resulted.

== June 19, 1935 (Wednesday) ==
- A mutiny in a prison coal mine in Lansing, Kansas was put down after 21 hours. No one was injured but an estimated $25,000 damage was done to the mine.
- Prince Edward's recent remarks were brought up in the House of Commons when Aneurin Bevan quizzed Foreign Minister Samuel Hoare about the idea to invite German war veterans to England. The Foreign Minister replied that it was a matter "entirely for the ex-servicemen's organisations" and that he could neither "approve nor disapprove" of the Prince's comments.
- Born: Derren Nesbitt, actor, in London, England

== June 20, 1935 (Thursday) ==
- Richard Hauptmann appealed his murder conviction in the Lindbergh kidnapping case.
- Died: Geoffrey Howard, 58, British politician

== June 21, 1935 (Friday) ==
- The Rockefeller Institute in New York reported that French surgeon Alexis Carrel had succeeded in keeping the internal organs of an animal alive outside its body, with the help of a perfusion pump invented by Charles Lindbergh.
- More than 2,000 homes were destroyed by a fire in Peshawar, though no casualties were reported.
- Born: Françoise Sagan, playwright, novelist and screenwriter, in Cajarc, France (d. 2004)

== June 22, 1935 (Saturday) ==
- In Geneva, the International Labour Conference adopted a convention designed to establish a 40-hour work week.
- Born: Floyd Norman, animator, in Santa Barbara, California

== June 23, 1935 (Sunday) ==
- Britain sent diplomat Anthony Eden to Rome in another attempt to avert war between Italy and Ethiopia.
- A bomb exploded at the American embassy in Mexico City. It was tossed over the embassy's wall and exploded in the patio, but did no damage other than blowing out several windows.

== June 24, 1935 (Monday) ==
- 14 people died in an air crash in Medellín, Colombia, including singer and film actor Carlos Gardel (aged 44).
- German runner Otto Peltzer was sentenced to 18 months in prison for "homosexual offenses".
- Born: Ron Kramer, American football player, in Girard, Kansas (d. 2010); Terry Riley, composer, in Colfax, California

== June 25, 1935 (Tuesday) ==
- 57,000 boxing fans packed Yankee Stadium to watch Joe Louis defeat Primo Carnera by technical knockout in the sixth round.

== June 26, 1935 (Wednesday) ==
- Anthony Eden left Rome after three days of unproductive discussions with Mussolini.
- The Reich Labour Service Law went into effect in Nazi Germany, requiring all between the ages of 18 and 25 to perform six months of labour service.

== June 27, 1935 (Thursday) ==
- An unofficial poll conducted across Britain to determine the public's level of support for the League of Nations ended after seven months. The results were announced that evening, showing that 11,090,287 out of 11,446,270 (96.8%) favoured continued adherence to the League. 37.9% of all voters across England, Scotland, Wales and Northern Ireland cast ballots in the poll.
- At Fenway Park in Boston, Danno O'Mahony pinned Jim Londos to win the National Wrestling Association World Heavyweight Championship.
- Born: Ramon Zamora, martial arts film actor, in San Juan, Metro Manila, Philippines (d. 2007)

== June 28, 1935 (Friday) ==
- President Roosevelt ordered the construction of a federal gold vault at Fort Knox.
- Alf Perry won the Open Championship.
- Born: John Inman, comedic actor and singer, in Preston, Lancashire (d. 2007)

== June 29, 1935 (Saturday) ==
- The first of three fragments of the Swanscombe Skull was found in Kent England.
- The Bankhead–Jones Act was enacted in the United States.
- Born: Katsuya Nomura, in Mineyama (now Kyotango), Kyoto Prefecture, Japan, Japanese baseball player and manager (d. 2020)
- Died: Kaitarō Hasegawa, 35, Japanese novelist (bronchial asthma)

== June 30, 1935 (Sunday) ==
- 75 were reported dead in Japan's worst flooding in half a century.
- Reports surfaced that Hitler was using body doubles to thwart any potential assassins.
