= March 1935 =

Month of 1935

<<	March 1935					>>
Su	Mo	Tu	We	Th	Fr	Sa
					1	2
3	4	5	6	7	8	9
10	11	12	13	14	15	16
17	18	19	20	21	22	23
24	25	26	27	28	29	30
31

The following events occurred in March 1935:

== March 1, 1935 (Friday) ==
- The Territory of the Saar Basin was formally returned to Germany.
- Greek coup d'état attempt: A Venizelist revolt broke out against the government of Greece.
- Born: Robert Conrad, actor, in Chicago, Illinois (d. 2020)

== March 2, 1935 (Saturday) ==
- Prajadhipok formally abdicated the throne of Siam and was succeeded by his nephew Ananda Mahidol.
- 17 Austrian Nazis were condemned to death for smuggling explosives into the country.
- Porky Pig made his debut in the short, I Haven't Got a Hat.

== March 3, 1935 (Sunday) ==
- The Universidad Autónoma de Guadalajara was founded in Mexico.
- Born: Zhelyu Zhelev, 1st President of Bulgaria, in Veselinovo, Bulgaria (d. 2015)

== March 4, 1935 (Monday) ==
- The British Government issued a white paper justifying the country's increase of armaments and blaming Germany's rearmament as responsible.
- Anti-Semitic posters appeared in towns all over the Saarland despite a German promise to the League of Nations to not persecute Jews in the Saar for 12 months.
- The U.S. Supreme Court decided Baldwin v. G.A.F. Seelig, Inc.
- Born: Bent Larsen, chess grandmaster, in Tilsted near Thisted, Denmark (d. 2010)

== March 5, 1935 (Tuesday) ==
- Italy and Ethiopia agreed to establish a neutral zone along the border of Italian Somaliland, although Italy continued to build up its military in the region.
- An LNER train attained a record maximum speed of 108 mph during a run from London to Newcastle.
- Born: Paul Sand, comedic actor, in Santa Monica, California

== March 6, 1935 (Wednesday) ==
- The Soviet Union announced that all private trade had finally been eliminated with only minor exceptions such as market vending.
- The first edition of the SS newspaper Das Schwarze Korps appeared.
- A new sculpture by Jacob Epstein titled Ecce Homo went on display at the Leicester Galleries, depicting an eleven-foot tall Christ with a square face and a broad, flat nose reminiscent of Polynesian art. The Catholic Times blasted the sculpture as "a distorted reminiscence of a man, the debased, sensuous flat features of an Asiatic monstrosity", while Conservative politician Cooper Rawson stood in the House of Commons and asked the government to remove or confiscate the statue for offending public decency. Of the controversy, Epstein himself only said: "I've made the statue and I've nothing to say about it – except what I've already said in the statue."
- Born: Ron Delany, runner, in Arklow, Ireland
- Died: Oliver Wendell Holmes Jr., 93, American jurist; Roque Ruaño, 57, Spanish priest-civil engineer

== March 7, 1935 (Thursday) ==
- Malcolm Campbell set a new land speed record of 276.816 mph at Daytona Beach.
- Ananda Mahidol was crowned King of Siam while in Switzerland.

== March 8, 1935 (Friday) ==
- The faithful dog Hachikō died in Shibuya, Tokyo, Japan after waiting for his dead owner in the same spot every day for nine years.
- Born: George Coleman, jazz saxophonist, bandleader and composer, in Memphis, Tennessee

== March 9, 1935 (Saturday) ==
- Cuba's constitution was suspended as the government fought nationwide strikes.
- Nikita Khrushchev was elected chief of the Moscow Communist Party.
- Porky Pig made his debut in the Warner Bros. short film I Haven't Got a Hat.
- Died: Edmund von Hellmer, 84, Austrian sculptor

== March 10, 1935 (Sunday) ==
- The Bill Holman comic strip Smokey Stover ran for the first time in the Chicago Tribune.

== March 11, 1935 (Monday) ==
- The Greek coup d'état attempt was put down and Eleftherios Venizelos fled the country.
- Cuba executed 13 soldiers for aiding strikers.
- The Bank of Canada opened.
- Egon Kisch left Australia.

== March 12, 1935 (Tuesday) ==
- A radiotelephone line opened between Berlin and Tokyo.
- Born: Jacques Benveniste, immunologist, in Paris, France (d. 2004)

== March 13, 1935 (Wednesday) ==
- Nazi Germany indirectly banned Jews from working in manual trades when a guild organization was established requiring everyone to pass a master's examination and be entered into a roll before they could pursue a manual trade.

== March 14, 1935 (Thursday) ==
- Anton Rintelen was sentenced to life imprisonment for his involvement in the July Putsch.

== March 15, 1935 (Friday) ==
- Three men were shot dead in the Grand Mosque of Mecca trying to assassinate Ibn Saud with knives during Eid al-Adha observances.
- The musical film Gold Diggers of 1935 was released.
- Born: Judd Hirsch, actor, in the Bronx, New York; Jimmy Swaggart, televangelist, in Ferriday, Louisiana (d. 2025)

== March 16, 1935 (Saturday) ==
- Adolf Hitler formally renounced the disarmament clauses of the Treaty of Versailles and re-introduced conscription. Jews were not to be conscripted.
- The French Chamber of Deputies voted to raise the term of compulsory military service from one to two years.
- Died: John James Rickard Macleod, 58, Scottish biochemist, physiologist and Nobel laureate

== March 17, 1935 (Sunday) ==
- Nazis arrested 700 pastors of the oppositional Confessional Lutheran synod before they could read a proclamation criticizing the state church regime.
- Born: Patrick Etolu, high jumper, in Soroti District, Uganda (d. 2013)

== March 18, 1935 (Monday) ==
- The National Student League at Harvard University demanded the removal of a wreath in Appleton Chapel commemorating German war dead. The wreath, placed there the previous day by German Consul General Kurt von Tippelskirch, bore a swastika emblem.
- Haile Selassie said that Ethiopia would never apologize to Italy for wrongs not committed. "We will not be coerced or intimidated by the military preparations recently announced into according the satisfaction which Italy demands", he said.
- Born: Ole Barndorff-Nielsen, statistician, in Copenhagen, Denmark (d. 2022)

== March 19, 1935 (Tuesday) ==
- The Harlem race riot occurred.
- British troops in India fired on a huge crowd of Muslims and Hindus rioting against each other, killing 27.
- The League of Nations urged Italy and Ethiopia to do everything possible to avoid war.
- Berlin was darkened from 10 p.m. until midnight to conduct a mock bombing drill in the skies overhead. Householders who left lights on during the drill were liable to be fined or arrested.

== March 20, 1935 (Wednesday) ==
- France sent a message to the League of Nations calling for an extraordinary session to discuss German rearmament under Article XI of the League Covenant, which provided for a member nation to call to the League's attention any circumstance threatening international peace.
- Johan Nygaardsvold became Prime Minister of Norway.

== March 21, 1935 (Thursday) ==
- France and Italy delivered formal notes of protest to Germany against its decision to rearm. German Foreign Minister Konstantin von Neurath informed them that his government disregarded their notes because they did "not take the current situation into account."
- Persia officially changed its name to Iran.

== March 22, 1935 (Friday) ==
- Fernsehsender Paul Nipkow launched in Germany, the first public television station in the world.
- Born:
  - Berry L. Cannon, American aquanaut (d. 1969)
  - M. Emmet Walsh, actor, in Ogdensburg, New York (d. 2024)
- Died: Alexander Moissi, 56, Austrian-Albanian stage actor

== March 23, 1935 (Saturday) ==
- U.S. President Franklin D. Roosevelt formally approved the new constitution of the Philippines.
- The Soviet Union formally ceded the Chinese Eastern Railway to Manchukuo in exchange for 23.3 million yen. China insisted it still had part ownership of the railway and called the sale illegal.
- Joseph Goebbels issued a circular letter announcing that advertising would be banned from German radio starting October 1, because of "incompatibility with the political and cultural tasks of broadcasting."
- Died: Florence Moore, 48, American stage performer and silent film actress

== March 24, 1935 (Sunday) ==
- British Foreign Secretary Sir John Simon and Lord Privy Seal Anthony Eden began a four-day visit to Berlin to talk about a peace pact in Europe.
- The Original Amateur Hour was broadcast in the United States from coast to coast for the first time.
- Born:
  - Peter Bichsel, writer and journalist, in Lucerne, Switzerland (d. 2025)
  - Mary Berry, television presenter and chef in Bath, Somerset.

== March 25, 1935 (Monday) ==
- France approved a new naval program which included a plan to build a new 35,000 ton battleship.
- Paul van Zeeland became Prime Minister of Belgium.
- The stop-motion animated film The New Gulliver premiered in the Soviet Union.

== March 26, 1935 (Tuesday) ==
- In Kaunas, Lithuania, four Nazis from Memel were sentenced to execution by firing squad for plotting an uprising to restore Memel to Germany. 77 others were sentenced to prison.
- Died: Eugene Zimmerman, 72, Swiss-born American cartoonist

== March 27, 1935 (Wednesday) ==
- In Berlin, thousands of Nazis marched on the Lithuanian legation in protest against the death sentence handed down to four Nazis the previous day. The mob had to be held back by a police cordon.
- Born: Abelardo Castillo, writer, in San Pedro, Buenos Aires Province (d. 2017); John Henry Dowse, rugby union player, in Mackay, Queensland, Australia; Julian Glover, actor, in Hampstead, London, England

== March 28, 1935 (Thursday) ==
- The propaganda film Triumph of the Will, directed by Leni Riefenstahl ,received its premier at the Berlin Ufa-Palast.
- German War Minister Werner von Blomberg ordered the size of flags to be reduced wherever possible due to the shortage of wool.
- Born:
  - Jeanie Descombes, baseball player, in Springfield, Ohio
  - Józef Szmidt, athlete, in Miechowitz, Beuthen, Germany (d. 2024)
  - Michael Parkinson, journalist and television presenter (Parkinson), in Cudworth, Yorkshire, England (d. 2023)

== March 29, 1935 (Friday) ==
- German police said that they had arrested an unspecified number of nuns and monks in Catholic convents because they had violated laws prohibiting the exportation of foreign currency and other laws requiring German citizens to report any foreign exchange. 2.5 million marks were reported to have been involved.
- Anthony Eden moved on to Moscow to hold more peace talks with Soviet Foreign Minister Maxim Litvinov.
- Reynoldstown won the Grand National horse race.

== March 30, 1935 (Saturday) ==
- The Belgian Chamber of Deputies voted to suspend the gold standard and devalue the country's currency by 25 percent.
- Ethiopia broke off direct talks with Italy over their border disputes and sent a new note to the League of Nations.

== March 31, 1935 (Sunday) ==
- The Reichsmusikkammer rejected the renewal of expiring memberships for non-Aryans.
- John Paul Chase was incarcerated in Alcatraz under a life sentence.
- Born: Herb Alpert, musician, in Los Angeles; Judith Rossner, novelist, in New York City (d. 2005)
