= April 1935 =

Month of 1935

The following events occurred in April 1935:

<<	April 1935					>>
Su	Mo	Tu	We	Th	Fr	Sa
	1	2	3	4	5	6
7	8	9	10	11	12	13
14	15	16	17	18	19	20
21	22	23	24	25	26	27
28	29	30

== April 1, 1935 (Monday) ==
- The U.S. Supreme Court decided Grovey v. Townsend and Patterson v. Alabama.
- Pope Pius XI told a gathering of 20 cardinals that it would be an "enormous crime" if another war occurred. "We cannot persuade ourselves that those who should have at heart the prosperity and well-being of the people wish to push to suicide, ruin and extermination not only their own nation but a great part of humanity", he said.
- The Reserve Bank of India was founded.

== April 2, 1935 (Tuesday) ==
- Nazi Germany first revealed that it possessed anti-aircraft guns by naming Hermann Göring as the Commander of the Anti-Aircraft Force. It was forbidden in the Treaty of Versailles for Germany to have anti-aircraft artillery.
- Robert Watson-Watt of Great Britain patented the first practical radar system.
- Died: Bennie Moten, 40, American jazz pianist and band leader

== April 3, 1935 (Wednesday) ==
- Austria broke the Treaty of Saint-Germain with the announcement it was increasing its armed forces beyond the treaty's limit of 30,000 soldiers.
- Born: Harold Kushner, American rabbi and author, in Brooklyn, New York (d. 2023)
- Died: Henry Augustus Lukeman, 63, American sculptor

== April 4, 1935 (Thursday) ==
- Anthony Eden ended his European peace tour in Prague with the statement, "In the world today no nation can prosper on another's ruin. We are too intimately connected for that. We stand and fall together."
- Hermann Göring visited the Free City of Danzig in an attempt to influence Sunday's parliamentary elections in favour of Nazi candidates.
- Born: Kenneth Mars, actor, in Chicago, Illinois (d. 2011)

== April 5, 1935 (Friday) ==
- In response to the Patterson v. Alabama decision, Alabama Governor Bibb Graves ordered that the names of colored persons be put on the jury rolls in all 67 state counties.
- A very rare occurrence of a Japanese emperor leaving the imperial palace took place when Hirohito rode to the Tokyo railway station to greet Kang-de of Manchukuo.
- RMS Olympic begins its final voyage from New York City back to Southampton to be scrapped later in Jarrow.
- Died: Basil Champneys, 92, British architect and author

== April 6, 1935 (Saturday) ==
- A Dutch airliner en route from Prague to Amsterdam crashed and killed all seven aboard.
- Cambridge won the 87th Boat Race.
- Harold "Bunny" Levitt of Chicago made 499 consecutive basketball free throws, a world record that stood until 1975.
- Died: Edwin Arlington Robinson, 65, American poet and sonnet writer

== April 7, 1935 (Sunday) ==
- Parliamentary elections were held in the Free City of Danzig. Although the Nazis won 59% of the vote, this was short of the two-thirds majority needed to set up a dictatorship. A German Nazi and a Pole were shot during an outbreak of violence in Brentau.
- Tornadoes in the Deep South of the USA killed at least 26 people.

== April 8, 1935 (Monday) ==
- President Roosevelt signed the Emergency Relief Appropriation Act into law, creating the Works Progress Administration.
- The Soviet Union reduced the minimum age of eligibility for the death penalty to twelve years.
- Gene Sarazen won the second Masters Tournament.
- Died: Adolph Ochs, 77, American newspaper publisher

== April 9, 1935 (Tuesday) ==
- The Montreal Maroons defeated the Toronto Maple Leafs 4-1 to win the Stanley Cup in a three-game sweep.
- Tributes to Erich Ludendorff were held all over Germany on the occasion of his 70th birthday. Laudatory articles were published in newspapers and Hitler ordered that all public buildings display flags. Catholic and Protestant Confessional synod organizations refused to obey the flag order because of Ludendorff's professed anti-Christian beliefs.
- Four theatrical men running the British stage revue Stop Press (a retitled version of the American production As Thousands Cheer) were fined in court over a scene showing a man and a woman in bed together and another in which actors impersonating George Bernard Shaw and Jacob Epstein blow a raspberry. The prosecutor called the latter "a very unpleasant noise, even more unpleasant when put in the mouths of two very respectable persons."
- Born: Aulis Sallinen, classical music composer, in Salmi, Finland

== April 10, 1935 (Wednesday) ==
- Hermann Göring married his second wife, the actress Emmy Sonnemann.
- The sale of English newspapers was restricted in Germany.
- Born: Ken Squier, motorsports broadcaster, in Waterbury, Vermont (d. 2023)

== April 11, 1935 (Thursday) ==
- The Stresa Conference began in Stresa, Italy. Representatives of Britain, France and Italy met to discuss how to respond to Germany's rearmament and safeguard Austrian independence.
- An earthquake in northern Iran killed 500–600 people.
- A train collided with a school bus in Rockville, Maryland and killed 14 students.

== April 12, 1935 (Friday) ==
- U.S. President Franklin D. Roosevelt pledged up to $200 million to eliminate dangerous railroad crossings in the United States and avoid further tragedies like the one in Rockville.
- Kodak introduced Kodachrome, the first commercially available color film.
- RMS Olympic arrives for scrapping.
- On 12 April 1935, the plane that was adapted to become the Bristol Blenheim bomber, named Britain First, made its maiden flight from Filton Aerodrome, South Gloucestershire.

== April 13, 1935 (Saturday) ==
- King Victor Emmanuel III of Italy authorized the mobilization of an additional two divisions of Italy's armed forces.
- Regular air service began between London and Brisbane.

== April 14, 1935 (Sunday) ==
- Britain, France and Italy reached an agreement called the Stresa Front. Among the seven points in the resolution were "The pursuit of a common line of conduct before the League of Nations in discussing the French appeal against the German treaty violation", "To strengthen the position of Austria", and "To oppose by all practicable means any unilateral repudiation of treaties."
- Black Sunday: A severe dust storm occurred in the United States as part of the Dust Bowl.
- Ethiopia introduced compulsory military service for both men and women.
- Oswald Mosley made a speech in front of 5,000 supporters in Leicester in which he adopted a more openly anti-Semitic stance, declaring: "For the first time I openly and publicly challenge the Jewish interest in this country commanding commerce, commanding the press, commanding the cinema, dominating the City of London, killing industry with the sweatshops. These great interests are not intimidating, and will not intimidate, the Fascist movement of the modern age."
- Born: Erich von Däniken, Swiss mythographer and author, in Zofingen; Katie Horstman, baseball player, in Minster, Ohio
- Died: Emmy Noether, 53, German mathematician

== April 15, 1935 (Monday) ==
- The Roerich Pact was signed in Washington, D.C., legally establishing the protection of cultural objects as more important than their use or destruction for military purposes.
- On Budget Day in the United Kingdom, Chancellor of the Exchequer Neville Chamberlain estimated a surplus of £5.6 million and raised exemptions on personal income tax for married men and children, as well as reversing pay cuts for civil servants. Military spending was increased.
- Died: Anna Ancher, 75, Danish artist

== April 16, 1935 (Tuesday) ==
- At the League of Nations, Britain, France and Italy submitted the draft of a resolution that declared: "Germany has failed in the duty which lies upon all members of the international community to respect undertakings which they have contracted." At the same time, the resolution invited governments concerned to work on a plan for peace "within the framework of the League of Nations".
- Babe Ruth went 2-for-4 with a home run in his first game as a Boston Brave during a 4–2 win over the New York Giants.

== April 17, 1935 (Wednesday) ==
- The League of Nations adopted the three-power resolution condemning Germany, with only Denmark abstaining.
- A Pan American Sikorski S42 plane with a six-man crew set a new East-to-West Pacific flight record, flying from Alameda, California to Pearl Harbor, Hawaii in 17 hours and 14 minutes – a full seven hours faster than the old mark set in January 1934.

== April 18, 1935 (Thursday) ==
- The 12th congress of the International Alliance of Women for Suffrage and Equal Citizenship opened in Istanbul, Turkey.
- The crime film G Men starring James Cagney was released.
- Born: Paul A. Rothchild, record producer, in Brooklyn, New York (d. 1995)
- Died: Panait Istrati, 50, Romanian writer

== April 19, 1935 (Friday) ==
- Nazi Germany announced it would invoke the death penalty for pacifism during time of war or national emergency.
- Johnny Kelley won the Boston Marathon.
- Born: Dudley Moore, actor, comedian, jazz pianist and composer, in Hammersmith, London (d. 2002)

== April 20, 1935 (Saturday) ==
- Germany sent a diplomatic note to various countries protesting against Wednesday's resolution at the League of Nations. "The German Government contests to the governments which in the council of the League of Nations took in the deliberations of April 17 the right of making themselves judge over Germany", the note said. "The government sees in the deliberation of the Council of the League an attempt at new discriminations against Germany and therefore rejects it in the most resolute manner."
- Hitler was presented with about 60 new war planes for his 46th birthday.
- Rangers F.C. defeated Hamilton Academical 2-1 in the 1934–35 Scottish Cup Final.
- The music program Your Hit Parade premiered on NBC Radio. The initial format of the show had a house band playing the top 15 songs of the week in random order – the concept of a systemized "countdown" to the Number One song came later.
- The post office of Denver, Colorado was overwhelmed by a chain letter craze. Postal officials had asked for the letters, soliciting one dime each, to stop because they were based on an illegal pyramid scheme. The flood of mail not only continued, but soon spread to other American cities.
- Died: Lucy, Lady Duff-Gordon, 71, British fashion designer

== April 21, 1935 (Sunday) ==
- A powerful earthquake struck Formosa.
- Andrey Toshev became the 26th Prime Minister of Bulgaria.
- Born: Charles Grodin, actor and journalist, in Pittsburgh, Pennsylvania (d. 2021); Dolores Lee, baseball player, in Jersey City, New Jersey (d. 2014); Thomas Kean, 48th Governor of New Jersey and Chairman of the 9/11 Commission, in New York City

== April 22, 1935 (Monday) ==
- Joseph Stalin and Vyacheslav Molotov took their first ride on the Moscow Metropolitan subway, which opened to the public with free rides before being put into regular commercial operation next month.
- The horror film Bride of Frankenstein starring Boris Karloff and Elsa Lanchester premiered in Los Angeles.
- The German People's Party was founded in Romania.
- Born: Paul Chambers, jazz double bassist, in Pittsburgh, Pennsylvania (d. 1969)

== April 23, 1935 (Tuesday) ==
- The Polish Sejm passed the April Constitution, which introduced a presidential system with elements of authoritarianism.
- Born: Bunky Green, jazz alto saxophonist, in Milwaukee, Wisconsin (d. 2025)

== April 24, 1935 (Wednesday) ==
- It was announced that Silver Jubilee celebrations for King George V would be kept simple and inexpensive. This was a compromise as the king did not wish to have any special celebrations at all.
- American ambassador to the Soviet Union William Christian Bullitt, Jr. hosted The Spring Ball of the Full Moon which is said to have surpassed all other embassy parties in Moscow's history.
- Died: Anastasios Papoulas, 78, Greek general

== April 25, 1935 (Thursday) ==
- Reich Press Leader Max Amann signed a decree completing Nazi control over all press in Germany. Amann empowered himself to shut down any newspaper he wished, and made the appointment of all publishers and editors subject to his approval. Additionally, no newspaper could serve interests other than those of the government.
- The Shark Arm case began in Sydney, Australia when a tiger shark in an aquarium vomited, leaving the forearm of a man bearing a distinctive tattoo floating in the pool.
- Cambrian Airways was set up in the United Kingdom.
- At 6:34 p.m. on the evening of April 25, 1935, the Oregon State Capitol burned to the ground.

== April 26, 1935 (Friday) ==
- 20,000 supporters of Germanic paganism held a rally in the Berlin Sportpalast.
- Radio-PTT Vision (now TF1), the first television station in France, was launched.
- The horror film Mark of the Vampire starring Lionel Barrymore, Elizabeth Allan and Bela Lugosi was released.

== April 27, 1935 (Saturday) ==
- Germany confirmed that it had a submarine construction program underway, a new violation of the Treaty of Versailles.
- The Brussels International Exposition opened.
- Sheffield Wednesday beat West Bromwich Albion 4-2 in the FA Cup Final at Wembley Stadium.
- The German Propaganda Ministry asked editors to run fewer pictures of Nazi leaders at banquets or of the lavish homes they lived in.
- Born: Theo Angelopoulos, filmmaker, in Athens, Greece (d. 2012)

== April 28, 1935 (Sunday) ==
- 7,2000 Der Stahlhelm paraded in Hasenheide and ceremoniously removed the black crepe bows that had been carried on their standards as a symbol of mourning for the "shame of Versailles", in acknowledgement of Hitler's restoration of the German army.
- President Roosevelt gave a fireside chat titled On the Works Relief Program.
- Died: Alfred I. du Pont, 70, American industrialist and philanthropist

== April 29, 1935 (Monday) ==
- Reflective roadway markers known as "cat's eyes" were first used on British roads.
- A bench-clearing brawl broke out in the fifth inning of a baseball game at Wrigley Field between the Chicago Cubs and Pittsburgh Pirates when Cookie Lavagetto starting throwing punches at Billy Jurges, claiming that Jurges had tried to spike him. Lavagetto, Jurges, Roy Joiner and Guy Bush were all ejected from the game. The Cubs won, 12-11.
- Born: April Ashley, model and restaurant hostess, in Liverpool, England (d. 2021); Otis Rush, blues guitarist and singer, in Philadelphia, Mississippi (d. 2018)
- Died: Ed Rose, 59, American lyricist

== April 30, 1935 (Tuesday) ==
- President Roosevelt established the Resettlement Administration, providing government funds to resettle farmers on more productive land.
- A Trans World Airlines test plane set a new transcontinental record for transport planes, flying from Burbank, California to Floyd Bennett Field in New York City in 11 hours and 5 minutes – 30 minutes shorter than the old record. Most of the flight was conducted by autopilot.
