= May 1935 =

Month of 1935

<<	May 1935					>>
Su	Mo	Tu	We	Th	Fr	Sa
			1	2	3	4
5	6	7	8	9	10	11
12	13	14	15	16	17	18
19	20	21	22	23	24	25
26	27	28	29	30	31

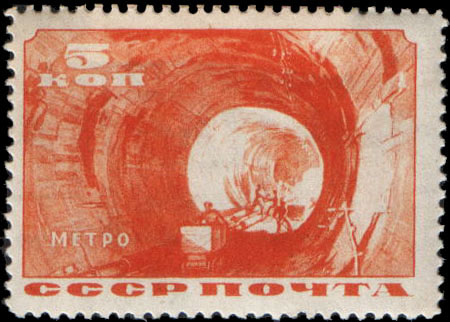
May 15: Moscow's Metro is opened to the public

The following events occurred in May 1935:

== May 1, 1935 (Wednesday) ==
- The Digor earthquake in eastern Turkey killed 540 people.
- The U.S. Senate voted to extend the National Recovery Administration another 10 months.
- The Federal Music Project was enacted in the United States.
- Died: Antero Rubín, 84, Spanish general and politician

== May 2, 1935 (Thursday) ==
- The Franco-Soviet Treaty of Mutual Assistance was signed.
- The stage musical Glamorous Night premiered at the Theatre Royal, Drury Lane in London.
- Born: Lance LeGault, actor, in Chicago, Illinois (d. 2012)

== May 3, 1935 (Friday) ==
- A worldwide peace broadcast, the first of its kind, was held to honor Jane Addams. Representatives of Britain, Japan, Russia and France gathered in Washington's McPherson Square to introduce speakers broadcasting from their respective countries. Addams herself participated by speaking from a radio broadcasting studio as well.

== May 4, 1935 (Saturday) ==
- An automobile carrying Jackie Coogan and four other people plunged off a road and into a creek east of San Diego. Coogan survived with minor injuries but everyone else was killed, including Jackie's father, filmmaker Robert J. Horner and the actor Junior Durkin.
- French Prime Minister Pierre-Étienne Flandin broke his left arm in an automobile collision driving to his home. His wife and son-in-law were also injured.
- Omaha won the Kentucky Derby.
- Castleford defeated Huddersfield 11–8 to win the Challenge Cup of rugby before 39,000 at Wembley Stadium.
- Born: Med Hondo, Mauritanian-born French voice actor and filmmaker (died March 2nd, 2019)
- Died: Junior Durkin, 19, American actor (car accident); Robert J. Horner, 40, American film producer, director and screenwriter (car accident)

== May 5, 1935 (Sunday) ==
- Parliamentary elections were held in Yugoslavia; the Yugoslav National Party won 303 of 370 seats.
- Former Greek Prime Minister Eleftherios Venizelos and general Nikolaos Plastiras were sentenced in absentia to death for their roles in the Greek coup d'état attempt.
- Latvia defeated Spain 24–18 in the championship final of the first-ever FIBA European Championship basketball tournament.

== May 6, 1935 (Monday) ==
- Silver Jubilee celebrations for King George V began across the British Empire. The King and Queen attended a service at St Paul's Cathedral.
- TWA Flight 6 crashed in bad weather near Atlanta, Missouri.
- Died: Bronson M. Cutting, 46, United States Senator (plane crash)

== May 7, 1935 (Tuesday) ==
- Italy mobilized three more divisions.
- Liberia had a constitutional referendum alongside general elections. The referendum confirmed special legislation approving a term extension for the President.

== May 8, 1935 (Wednesday) ==
- Amelia Earhart flew nonstop from Mexico City to Newark, New Jersey in a record 14 hours, 22 minutes and 50 seconds. She was the first pilot to fly that route without stopping along the way.

== May 9, 1935 (Thursday) ==
- The British government ordered aircraft manufacturers to increase their production to the fullest capacity and not to fill any foreign orders for aircraft without the Air Ministry's approval.
- The John Ford-directed drama film The Informer was released.

== May 10, 1935 (Friday) ==
- King George V and Queen Mary surprised their subjects by riding around the poorer districts of South London unannounced. The royal car was mobbed at several crossings by cheering crowds.

== May 11, 1935 (Saturday) ==
- Nazi Germany ordered that all new or altered buildings would be required to consult the Air Protection League on the possibility of constructing bomb- and gas-proof cellars.
- Omaha won the Preakness Stakes.
- Born: Doug McClure, actor, in Glendale, California (d. 1995)

== May 12, 1935 (Sunday) ==
- King George and Queen Mary made another surprise visit to poorer districts of London, this time in the East.
- Born: Felipe Alou, baseball player and manager, in Haina, Dominican Republic; Johnny Bucyk, ice hockey player, in Edmonton, Alberta, Canada; Gary Peacock, jazz double bassist, in Burley, Idaho (d. 2020)
- Died: Józef Piłsudski, 67, Polish general and statesman (liver cancer)

== May 13, 1935 (Monday) ==
- Pan American Airways opened regular flights from San Francisco to Pearl Harbor, Hawaii.
- T. E. Lawrence was seriously injured in a motorcycle accident in Dorset.
- The horror film Werewolf of London was released.
- Born: Luciano Benetton, member of the Benetton family and co-founder of the Benetton Group, in Treviso, Italy

== May 14, 1935 (Tuesday) ==
- The Constitution of the Philippines was ratified by popular vote.
- The Berne Trial ended in Switzerland with the court determining The Protocols of the Elders of Zion to be a hoax. Two Nazis were found guilty of libel for distributing it.
- Benito Mussolini made a senate speech warning other nations not to intervene in the Abyssinia Crisis, saying that only Italy "can be the judge in this most delicate matter."
- Died: Magnus Hirschfeld, 67, German-Jewish physician and sexologist

== May 15, 1935 (Wednesday) ==
- The Moscow Metropolitan subway officially opened for public operation. Joseph Stalin made a speech thanking the men and women who completed the subway in record time.
- Italian newspapers began a campaign of words clearly meant to justify an Italian invasion and takeover of Ethiopia. Il Giornale d'Italia wrote that Ethiopia had an "incapacity to comprehend and assimilate the elementary values of civilization", making it necessary for the country to undergo "an organization which will deprive it of the possibility of menacing any more neighboring colonies – above all, Italian interests which have been attacked."
- Gustaaf Deloor of Belgium won the 1st first Vuelta a España bicycle race.

== May 16, 1935 (Thursday) ==
- The Soviet Union and Czechoslovakia signed a mutual assistance pact.
- Born: Floyd Smith, ice hockey player, in Perth, Ontario, Canada

== May 17, 1935 (Friday) ==
- The body of Józef Piłsudski was taken by train to Kraków for burial after a funeral service in St. John's Archcathedral in Warsaw.
- Vivien Leigh signed a record £50,000 film contract in Britain.
- Born: Ryke Geerd Hamer, physician, in Mettmann, Germany (d. 2017); Dennis Potter, television dramatist, screenwriter and journalist, in Berry Hill, Gloucestershire, England (d. 1994)
- Died: Paul Dukas, 69, French composer, critic, scholar and teacher

== May 18, 1935 (Saturday) ==
- The Soviet airliner Tupolev ANT-20 Maxim Gorky collided with a stunt plane and exploded over Moscow, killing 49. It was the worst air disaster involving a passenger plane in history up to that time.
- Serfdom was abolished in Ethiopia.
- Lithuanian President Antanas Smetona commuted the sentences of four Memel Nazis from death to life imprisonment. They had been convicted in March of plotting an uprising. Their aim had been to separate Memel from Lithuania .

== May 19, 1935 (Sunday) ==
- Parliamentary elections were held in Czechoslovakia. The Republican Party of Farmers and Peasants won a plurality of 45 seats, one more than the newly established Sudeten German Party.
- John Fisher and Thomas More were canonized by Pope Pius XI.
- The first section of the Reichsautobahn, connecting Frankfurt and Heidelberg, was opened by Hitler in Darmstadt.
- The Catholic War Veterans of the United States of America was incorporated in the State of New York.
- Born: David Hartman, journalist and media host, in Pawtucket, Rhode Island
- Died: T. E. Lawrence, 46, British archaeologist, military officer and diplomat; Charles Martin Loeffler, 74, German-born American violinist and composer

== May 20, 1935 (Monday) ==
- Haile Selassie sent his most strongly-worded telegram yet to the League of Nations, saying "It is patent that Italy is illegally occupying an important part of Ethiopian territory. She has recently initiated a campaign of propaganda to endeavor to justify her occupation of Ethiopian territory as a mission of civilization, and her aggression and rapacity against our people as the treatment due a barbarous nation. No agreement will be possible by diplomatic means to arrange for a genuinely impartial examination in Italy's present state of mind."
- The Roger Babson statistical organization announced the results of a survey that indicated Franklin D. Roosevelt would win re-election in 1936, although nearly half of those surveyed said they had lost confidence in the New Deal.
- Born: José Mujica, 40th President of Uruguay, in Montevideo (d. 2025)

== May 21, 1935 (Tuesday) ==
- The Reichstag convened for just the fifth time since the Nazi takeover. Hitler gave a speech outlining a 13-point plan for disarmament and improvement of international relations, though he remained adamant that Germany would only limit the size of its military to the same degree that other nations did.
- Germany passed a new conscription law providing for one year of military service for all males between 18 and 45.
- The Reichswehr was renamed the Wehrmacht.
- The U.S. Supreme Court decided Sinclair & Carrol Co. v. Interchemical Corp.
- Died: Jane Addams, 74, social worker, public philosopher, writer and activist

== May 22, 1935 (Wednesday) ==
- Stanley Baldwin, admitting that Britain faced a "time of emergency", told the House of Commons that the Royal Air Force would be tripled in size over the next two years to give it 1,500 aircraft by 1937, the same number that Germany said it intended to have. Baldwin acknowledged Hitler's speech of the previous day by saying its proposals would "receive the fullest and fairest consideration."
- President Roosevelt vetoed the Patman Bonus Bill. The president appeared before the House and gave his reasons for doing so, warning that it invited "an ultimate reckoning in uncontrollable prices and in the destruction of the value of savings, that will strike most cruelly those like the veterans who seem to be temporarily benefited." The House then voted to override the presidential veto, 322 to 98, sending it back to the Senate.
- Germany called up all able-bodied males born in 1914 and 1915 for medical examinations starting June 1, for military service beginning November 1.
- Born: Barry Rogers, salsa musician and jazz fusion trombonist, in the Bronx, New York (d. 1991)

== May 23, 1935 (Thursday) ==
- The U.S. Senate sustained President Roosevelt's veto, 54–40.
- Hitler underwent a secret operation to remove a polyp from his vocal folds. He would not make another public address for three months.

== May 24, 1935 (Friday) ==
- Crown Prince Frederik of Denmark married Princess Ingrid of Sweden in Stockholm.
- The first night game in major league baseball history was played at Crosley Field in Cincinnati. President Roosevelt pushed a button turning on the lights and 20,422 fans watched the hometown Cincinnati Reds defeat the Philadelphia Phillies 2–1.
- Pope Pius XI condemned the Nazis' forced sterilization programme.
- The George Weyerhaeuser kidnapping occurred in Tacoma, Washington.
- Born: Joan Micklin Silver, film director, in Omaha, Nebraska (d. 2020)

== May 25, 1935 (Saturday) ==
- Italy accepted mediation by the League of Nations in the Abyssinia Crisis, although the League Council gave in to Mussolini's refusal to agree to stop massing troops along the border of Italian Somaliland.
- Jesse Owens broke five world records and matched a sixth in a single afternoon of track and field events during the Big Ten championships at Ann Arbor, Michigan.
- Babe Ruth of the Boston Braves hit the last three home runs of his major league career (Numbers 712, 713 and 714) during a game at Forbes Field against the Pittsburgh Pirates.
- Born: Cookie Gilchrist, gridiron football player, in Brackenridge, Pennsylvania (d. 2011)

== May 26, 1935 (Sunday) ==
- Several were injured in a riot at the Tomb of the Unknown Soldier in Paris. A group of Nationalists had gathered to see Maxime Weygand preside at a ceremony rekindling the tomb's eternal flame, cheering him on with shouts of "put Weygand in power!" The riot was set off by someone failing to doff his hat.

== May 27, 1935 (Monday) ==
- The U.S. Supreme Court decided Humphrey's Executor v. United States, Louisville Joint Stock Land Bank v. Radford and Schechter Poultry Corp. v. United States. These three decisions were major defeats for the Roosevelt Administration as they rendered the National Recovery Administration unconstitutional.
- Turkey passed a law making Sunday the country's day of rest instead of Friday.
- The provincial government of Ontario, Canada took custody of the Dionne quintuplets away from their parents. Authorities claimed they were protecting the babies from germs, potential kidnappers and exploitation.
- Born: Carole Lesley, actress, in Chelmsford, England (d. 1974); Lee Merriwether, beauty queen and actress, in Los Angeles

== May 28, 1935 (Tuesday) ==
- The Central Bank of Argentina was established.
- Eva Braun attempted suicide in Munich with sleeping pills.

== May 29, 1935 (Wednesday) ==
- Rioting occurred in Northern Rhodesia between police and some of the 9,000 native workers on strike. Six natives were killed in the Copperbelt Province near Luanshya.
- The German Messerschmitt Bf 109 fighter plane had its first test flight.
- The California Pacific International Exposition opened.
- Died: Josef Suk, 61, Czech composer and violinist

== May 30, 1935 (Thursday) ==
- Kelly Petillo won the Indianapolis 500.
- Babe Ruth made the final plate appearance of his career, grounding out to first base in a game at the Baker Bowl against the Philadelphia Phillies and then taking himself out after one inning.
- Born: Ruta Lee, actress and dancer, in Montreal, Quebec, Canada
- Died: Clay Weatherly, 24 or 25, American racecar driver (killed in the Indianapolis 500)

== May 31, 1935 (Friday) ==

- The Quetta earthquake occurred in Balochistan, British India.
- At least 28 people died from widespread flooding in the states of Colorado, Nebraska and Wyoming.
- 20th Century Fox was founded by a merger of Twentieth Century Pictures and Fox Film.
- The crime film Public Hero No. 1 was released.
- Born: Jim Bolger, 35th Prime Minister of New Zealand, in Ōpunake, Taranaki, New Zealand (d. 2025)
