= August 1935 =

Month of 1935

<<	August 1935					>>
Su	Mo	Tu	We	Th	Fr	Sa
				1	2	3
4	5	6	7	8	9	10
11	12	13	14	15	16	17
18	19	20	21	22	23	24
25	26	27	28	29	30	31

The following events occurred in August 1935:

== August 1, 1935 (Thursday) ==
- The August 1 Declaration was made by the Chinese Communist Party, calling for an end to the Chinese Civil War and for the nation to unite in resistance of Japan.
- Born: Mohinder Pratap Chand, Urdu writer and poet, in Karor Lal Esan, British India (d. 2020)

== August 2, 1935 (Friday) ==
- The Government of India Act was passed by the British Parliament receiving its Royal assent on that day.
- Born: Hank Cochran, country music singer and songwriter, in Isola, Mississippi (d. 2010)

== August 3, 1935 (Saturday) ==
- Defrocked Anglican priest Harold Davidson was arrested and charged with attempting suicide, having been on exhibition for the past ten days with a sign that he was "fasting unto death" in protest against a ruling prohibiting him from performing church duties.
- The August issue of Vanity Fair was banned in Japan because a caricature of Emperor Hirohito appeared in the magazine.
- About 25,000 people in Harlem, New York marched in protest against the threatened Italian invasion of Ethiopia.
- Born: Georgy Shonin, cosmonaut, in Rovenky, USSR (d. 1997)

== August 4, 1935 (Sunday) ==
- The New Farmers of America organization was officially created.

== August 5, 1935 (Monday) ==
- A typhoon struck Quanzhou, China killing hundreds.
- Field Marshal August von Mackensen published a letter resigning his honorary chairmanship of Der Stahlhelm. He thanked the members for their dedication and explained that the organization's purpose had been fulfilled by Hitler's conscription army.
- Died: David Townsend, 43, American art director (auto accident)

== August 6, 1935 (Tuesday) ==
- Riots broke out in the French cities of Paris, Le Havre and Brest in protest against government economic measures.
- The mayor of the German spa town of Bad Tölz ordered all Jews to leave within 24 hours. A Jewish owned-hotel was closed by police to "protect it".
- Abyssinia Crisis: Italy called 75,000 more men to arms.

== August 7, 1935 (Wednesday) ==
- Ethiopian Crown Prince Asfaw Wossen reviewed 100,000 tribal warriors near Gondar.
- 39,195 boxing fans at Comiskey Park in Chicago watched Joe Louis knock out King Levinsky in the first round.
- 7 Italians were killed in a plane crash in Egypt, including Public Works Minister Luigi Razza.

== August 8, 1935 (Thursday) ==
- At least 5 were killed and between 100 and 200 injured in more anti-government rioting in Toulon.
- Born: Joe Tex, musician, in Rogers, Texas (d. 1982)

== August 9, 1935 (Friday) ==
- French Prime Minister Pierre Laval called an unprecedented meeting of all 86 prefects across the country and instructed them to firmly enforce his unpopular deflationary measures.
- Huey Long claimed on the floor of the Senate that his foes had discussed a plot to assassinate him.

== August 10, 1935 (Saturday) ==
- A plot to assassinate Mexican President Lázaro Cárdenas was reported foiled.
- The last remaining Freemason lodges in Nazi Germany were dissolved.
- Laval warned that a dictatorship in France was not unlikely if his economic measures failed to be enforced.

== August 11, 1935 (Sunday) ==
- Adolf Hitler made his first public speech since his operation in May, emerging from his retreat in the Bavarian mountains to give an address in Rosenheim warning his opponents that the Nazis were ready to crush all opposition.
- The football club Sportivo Trinidense was founded in Paraguay.

== August 12, 1935 (Monday) ==
- Aizawa Incident: Japanese Lieutenant Colonel Saburo Aizawa assassinated General Tetsuzan Nagata with his sword.
- Jan Smuts warned that a war between Italy and Ethiopia could spark a wider ethnic conflict between blacks and whites all throughout the continent of Africa.
- 14 were killed in a mine flood in Ribolla, Italy.
- Born: Ján Popluhár, footballer, in Čeklís, Czechoslovakia (d. 2011)
- Died: Tetsuzan Nagata, 51, Japanese general (assassinated); Friedrich Schottky, 84, German mathematician

== August 13, 1935 (Tuesday) ==
- A dam burst near Ovada, Italy, killing an estimated 250 people.
- Huey Long announced that he would run for U.S. president in 1936 as an independent candidate unless the Republicans nominated someone he would support. Long said he would seek the Democratic nomination instead if Roosevelt did not run for re-election.
- Born: Mudcat Grant, baseball player, in Lacoochee, Florida (d. 2021); Rod Hull, comedian, in Isle of Sheppey, Kent, England (d. 1999)

== August 14, 1935 (Wednesday) ==
- President Roosevelt signed the Social Security Act.
- Dazzy Vance of the Brooklyn Dodgers made his final major league appearance against the Chicago Cubs, giving up a base hit and a hit batsman to the only two batters he faced.
- 16-year-old Glenn LaRue Howard of Max, Nebraska, fell into a hot spring while fishing at Yellowstone National Park. He was able to climb out of the hot spring by himself, but died from his burns the following day.
- Died: Léonce Perret, 55, French actor and filmmaker

== August 15, 1935 (Thursday) ==
- American humorist Will Rogers and pioneering aviator Wiley Post were killed in the crash of Post’s light aircraft just after takeoff near Point Barrow, Alaska.
- A new Canadian federal election was called for October 14.
- The romance film Alice Adams starring Katharine Hepburn and Fred MacMurray was released.
- Born: Jim Dale, actor, voice artist and singer-songwriter, in Rothwell, Northamptonshire, England; Abby Dalton, actress, in Las Vegas, Nevada (d. 2020); Lionel Taylor, American football player, in Kansas City, Missouri (d. 2025)
- Died: Paul Signac, 71, French Neo-Impressionist painter

== August 16, 1935 (Friday) ==
- Representatives of France, Great Britain and Italy met in Paris to negotiate a solution to the Abyssinia Crisis.
- Haile Selassie offered new economic concessions to Italy, stressing he would not accept a military occupation but would grant facilities for mining, road construction and railway operations.

== August 17, 1935 (Saturday) ==
- AEG demonstrated the Magnetophon reel-to-reel tape recorder at the Berlin Radio Fair.
- Died: Charlotte Perkins Gilman, 75, American writer, feminist and activist (suicide)

== August 18, 1935 (Sunday) ==
- The Paris conference broke up with nothing resolved.
- At the opening of a fair in Königsberg, Reich Economics Minister Hjalmar Schacht said that certain Nazi policies were bad for the country's business. While agreeing with the government that secret societies had no right to exist, pastors and priests should not dabble in politics, and Jews "must resign themselves to a realization that their influence is broken in Germany once and for all", Schacht said that these issues could not be settled through actions that "seriously disturb business."
- Civilian Conservation Corps volunteer L. C. Hanley fell 660 feet (200 m) to his death from the South Rim of the Grand Canyon while intoxicated.
- Born: Rafer Johnson, decathlete and actor, in Hillsboro, Texas (d. 2020); Hifikepunye Pohamba, 2nd President of Namibia, in Okanghudi, South-West Africa

== August 19, 1935 (Monday) ==
- A fire swept through the Berlin Radio Fair, killing 3 people and doing an estimated 1.5 billion Reichsmarks in damage.
- Born: Bobby Richardson, baseball player, in Sumter, South Carolina

== August 20, 1935 (Tuesday) ==
- The military of Ecuador announced that it had arrested President José María Velasco Ibarra for attempting to proclaim a dictatorship. Antonio Pons was appointed Ibarra's successor.
- A tunnel collapsed at an S-Bahn construction site at the Brandenburg Gate, killing 19 workers.
- Scientists at the University of California announced the isolation of Vitamin E.
- Born: Ron Paul, physician and politician, in Pittsburgh, Pennsylvania
- Died: Edith Roberts, 35, American film actress (sepsis)

== August 21, 1935 (Wednesday) ==
- The U.S. Senate passed a bill declaring American neutrality in foreign wars. The measure banned shipment of arms to belligerents and declared that American citizens traveling on the ships of warring nations were doing so at their own risk. President Roosevelt reserved comment on the measure pending its study.
- President Franklin D. Roosevelt signs the Historic Sites Act of 1935 into law, marking the first time that the preservation of significant objects and sites is explicitly made a responsibility and obligation of the U.S. government.
- The Cecil B. DeMille-directed historical adventure film The Crusades premiered at the Astor Theatre in New York City.
- Benny Goodman's orchestra performs at the Palomar Ballroom in Los Angeles, establishing an early milestone in the swing era.
- Died: John Hartley, 86, English tennis player

== August 22, 1935 (Thursday) ==
- The major Italian newspaper Il Giornale d'Italia ran a front-page editorial directed at Britain, warning that British newspapers urging economic sanctions against Italy were "working for war."
- Georgi Dimitrov was announced as the successor to Grigory Zinoviev as General Secretary of the Executive Committee of the Communist International.
- Born: Annie Proulx, journalist and author, in Norwich, Connecticut

== August 23, 1935 (Friday) ==
- Britain ordered a buildup of its forces in the Mediterranean region to guard the Suez Canal from potential Italian attack.
- Joseph Stalin ordered that four double-headed eagles (a Tsarist emblem) be removed from the towers of the Moscow Kremlin and replaced with giant stars.
- Born: Roy Strong, art historian, in Winchmore Hill, Middlesex, England

== August 24, 1935 (Saturday) ==
- Ethiopian Emperor Haile Selassie ordered civilians to leave Addis Ababa and disperse across the country in order to reduce casualties from the anticipated aerial bombardment by Italian planes.
- The Agricultural Adjustment Act Amendment was enacted in the United States.

== August 25, 1935 (Sunday) ==
- The U.S. State Department published the text of a note sent to the Soviet Union, threatening an interruption of friendly relations unless the Soviets put a stop to plotting the violent overthrow of the American government.
- Iran and the Soviet Union signed the Treaty of Establishment, Commerce and Navigation.
- Died: Mack Swain, 59, American actor and vaudeville performer

== August 26, 1935 (Monday) ==
- Luxembourg and the Soviet Union established diplomatic relations with each other.
- Born: Geraldine Ferraro, politician and vice presidential candidate, in Newburgh, New York (d. 2011)

== August 27, 1935 (Tuesday) ==
- At the stroke of midnight the 74th United States Congress adjourned for the year, five and a half hours into a filibuster by Huey Long of a $103 million social securities bill.
- The Soviet Union rejected the U.S. government's protest note, replying that it had "no facts which could be regarded as a violation on the part of the Soviet Government of its obligations."
- Copies of the latest issue of the American magazine Time appeared on British newsstands with one page torn out, referring to alleged intrigues by Princess Marina of Greece and Denmark to place her husband Prince George, Duke of Kent on the throne of Greece.
- Died: Childe Hassam, 75, American Impressionist painter

== August 28, 1935 (Wednesday) ==
- In an address to 2,000 Catholic nurses, Pope Pius XI commented on the Abyssinia Crisis by saying, "A war of sheer conquest and nothing else would certainly be an unjust war. It ought, therefore, to be unimaginable – a thing sad and horrible beyond expression. An unjust war is unthinkable. We cannot admit its possibility, and we deliberately reject it ... if it be true that the need for expansion and the need for frontier defence do exist, then we cannot forbid ourselves from hoping that the need will be met by means other than war."
- Former Vienna police chief Otto Steinhäusl went before a court-martial, charged with high treason for his role in the July Putsch.
- Born: Harold Snoad, English television producer, director and writer, best known for his work on Keeping Up Appearances, Don't Wait Up and Ever Decreasing Circles. (d. 2024)

== August 29, 1935 (Thursday) ==
- The engagement of Prince Henry, Duke of Gloucester and Lady Alice Montagu Douglas Scott was announced.
- The musical comedy film Top Hat starring Fred Astaire and Ginger Rogers premiered in New York City.
- Born: László Garai, scientist and psychologist, in Budapest, Hungary (d. 2019)
- Died: Astrid of Sweden, 29, Queen consort of the Belgians (auto accident)

== August 30, 1935 (Friday) ==
- President Roosevelt signed the Guffey Coal Act and the Revenue Act of 1935 into law.
- The Reichsmusikkammer banned non-Aryans from playing in German orchestras.
- The historical drama film Anna Karenina starring Greta Garbo and Fredric March premiered at the Capitol Theatre in New York City.
- Born: Papa John Phillips, musician, in Los Angeles (d. 2001)
- Died: Henri Barbusse, 62, French novelist and journalist

== August 31, 1935 (Saturday) ==
- In the Soviet Union, Alexey Stakhanov reportedly attained a productivity record by mining 102 tons of coal in 5 hours 45 minutes, exceeding the normal output of 7 tons by 14.5 times. A productivity initiative known as the Stakhanovite movement was named for this accomplishment. In 1988 the Soviet press revealed that the record was fraudulent because the output of Stakhanov's co-workers were added to his own.
- As part of United States non-interventionism in the face of growing tensions in Europe, President Roosevelt signed the first of the Neutrality Acts of 1930s into law.
- Vern Kennedy of the Chicago White Sox pitched a 5-0 no-hitter against the Cleveland Indians.
- Born: Eldridge Cleaver, activist, in Wabbaseka, Arkansas (d. 1998); Frank Robinson, baseball player and manager, in Beaumont, Texas (d. 2019)
