= Reinsdorf explosion =

1935 factory disaster in Germany

The Reinsdorf explosion took place on 13 June 1935 at the WASAG factory by Reinsdorf (since 1993 a district of Lutherstadt Wittenberg). It claimed over 100 lives, left about as many seriously injured, caused more than 300 light injuries, and led to severe property damage both to the factory and to the villages in its vicinity.

== History ==
The WASAG (Westfälisch-Anhaltische Sprengstoff Actien-Gesellschaft; "Westphalian-Anhaltian Explosives Stock Corporation") Reinsdorf plant opened in 1894. Under the terms of the Versailles Treaty, it was the only facility in Germany after 1918 still permitted to manufacture gunpowder or explosives for military purposes. The production capacity consistently grew, especially after 1933. By 1935, the factory had almost 8,000 employees.

== Course of the disaster ==
An acid-resistant glove, which had fallen into the collection tank of a worker in the residue washery of the toluene plant, caused a fire. The collection tanks exploded, and the resulting blast wave and burning fragments furled about led to a chain reaction, as a result of which two nitroglycerin plants and a large nitroglycerin powder magazine caught fire, exploded, and were fully destroyed. At least 27 tonnes of explosives detonated. Iron equipment, tank cars, and storage tanks were flung hundreds of metres away. Three to four kilometres away, the towns of Reinsdorf and Braunsdorf were particularly affected by the shock waves of the explosion; even eight kilometres away in Wittenberg, numerous shop windows were destroyed.

The injured were transported, mainly using confiscated private vehicles, to the Evangelical Hospital Paul Gerhardt Foundation in neighbouring Wittenberg which was under the direction of the surgeon Paul Bosse. With one exception, all of the seriously injured were saved. On 18 June, a state funeral took place in Reinsdorf with leaders Adolf Hitler, Hermann Göring, and Joseph Goebbels attending. In spite of the severe destruction, production resumed on 19 June, and the destroyed factories (with the exception of the toluene plant) were rebuilt.

== After 1945 ==
On 27 April 1945, as World War II came to a close and the Allied occupation of Germany began, the factory was seized by the Red Army. The Soviets proceeded to strip the plant of all usable machinery, equipment, and raw materials as war reparations before blowing up what remained. Only the administration building and the cafeteria at Gate 1 (located at the intersection between Heuweg and Kastanienweg) remained; these were used from 1959 as a tuberculosis hospital and from 1974 as a specialty hospital for pulmonology, surgery, and urology. The hospital closed operations in the year 2005.

== Reading ==
- Otto Blüthgen: Das Explosionsunglück im Sprengstoffwerk Reinsdorf am 13. Juni 1935. In: Heimatkalender 1988. Drei Kastanien Verlag, Lutherstadt Wittenberg 1997, pp. 54–66.
