= Louis B. Brodsky =

American lawyer

Louis Bernard Brodsky

Magistrate in The Tombs court, NYC
- In office 1924–1939

Personal details
- Born: December 25, 1879 Odesa, Russian Empire
- Died: April 29, 1970 (aged 86) Manhattan, New York City
- Education: New York University Law School

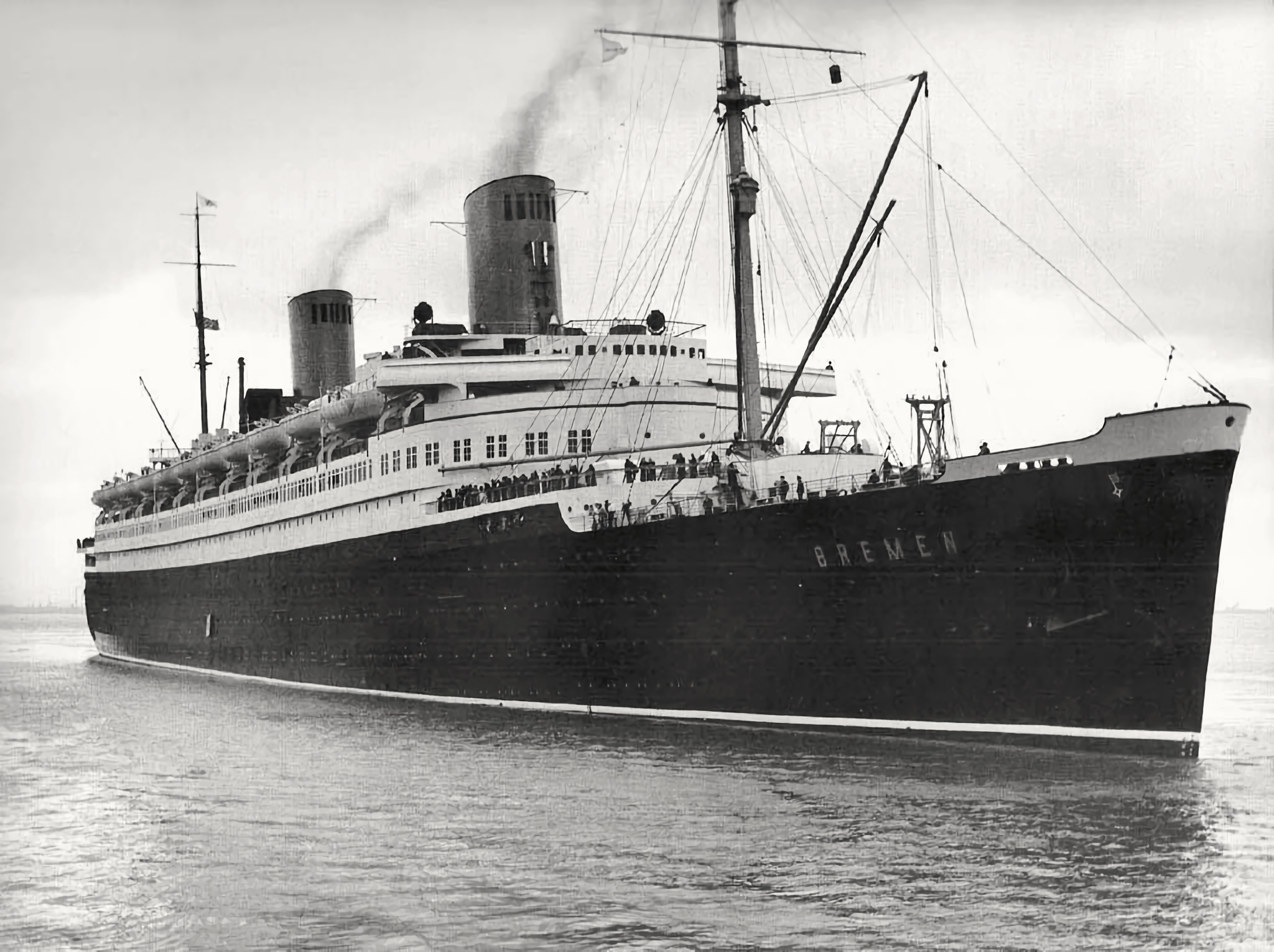
In 1935, Brodsky rendered the verdict on rioters of the SS Bremen (here, 1929)

Louis Bernard Brodsky (December 25, 1879 – April 29, 1970) was an American magistrate in The Tombs court in New York City known for the acquittal of the six men involved in the anti-Nazi SS Bremen riot in 1935 and for a progressive ruling regarding dancers and nudity in April 1935.

== Background ==
Brodsky was born into a Ukrainian Jewish family on December 25, 1879, to Elias and Sarah Brodsky. His family immigrated to New York in 1881, where his father worked as an embroiderer. He graduated from the New York University Law School in 1900 and applied for U.S. citizenship on December 26, 1900, the first day he was eligible. He was admitted to the New York Bar in 1901. His father died in 1924.

== Career ==
Brodsky was mostly involved in commercial cases as a trial lawyer. He was named a magistrate in 1924 by Mayor John F. Hylan. He filled an unexpired term and was reappointed to a 10-year-term by Mayor James J. Walker. He retired in 1939.

Brodsky was chairman of the National Hebrew Orphan Asylum, honorary president of the Hebrew Day and Night Nursery, director of the Home of Old Israel and Hebrew Orphan Home, and a trustee of the Israel Zion Hospital of Brooklyn, New York.

== Personal life and death ==
Brodsky resided at 169 Ocean Drive West in Stamford, Connecticut, in August 1952. On August 25, 1952, he was hit by a car outside the railroad station in Stamford. He sustained injuries to his head, left hand, and left leg but was reported to be in good condition.

Brodsky died at Mount Sinai Hospital in Manhattan, New York City, on April 29, 1970, at the age of 86. He resided at 465 Park Avenue at the time of his death. He was survived by his wife, Rose, a daughter, Mrs. Janet G. Frumberg, and a grandson.

== 1935 Rulings ==
=== Nudity case ruling ===
Brodsky dropped charges against Louise Wilson, 24, of 15 West 65th Street, Manhattan and Dorothy Sims, 22, of 450 West 150th Street, Manhattan. The two women were arrested by a policeman for indecency while performing before an audience of 101 men at a waiters' club at 80 Greenwich Street. Brodsky dismissed the women from court, saying "nudity is no longer considered indecent in uptown nightclubs and theaters." The women left the club without even a fan to cover them. Brodsky also released the 101 men who attended the performance who were detained at the police station overnight.

=== SS Bremen verdict ===
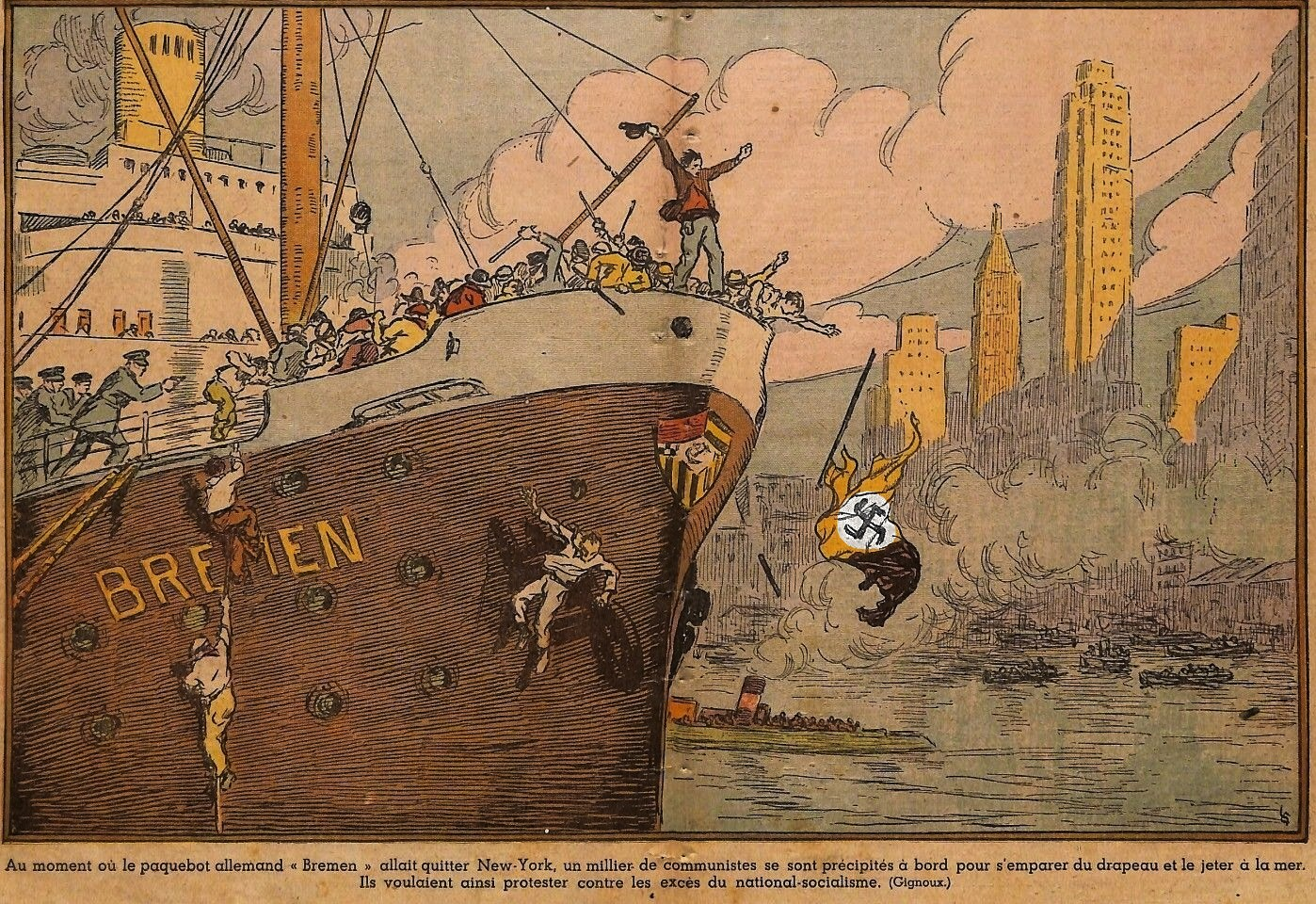
Illustration depicting anti-Nazi demonstrators attacking Bremen docked in New York Harbor, United States on 26 July 1935

Brodsky's most noteworthy decision came in a case involving six men arrested during a riot which occurred on July 26, 1935. He freed five of the six individuals who tore the Nazi swastika from the SS Bremen on account that their actions were justified, as Brodsky compared the Nazi emblem to a "pirate flag". He refused an apology even though German newspapers and government officials demanded one. United States Secretary of State Cordell Hull sent to Nazi Germany a note of "regret" for Brodsky's decision.

Brodsky's verdict became a catalyst for the adoption of Nuremberg Laws, which made the Swastika Flag the national flag of Nazi Germany.
