= SS Bremen (1928) =

German ocean liner in service 1929-1941

Coordinates: 53°30′27″N 8°32′14″E

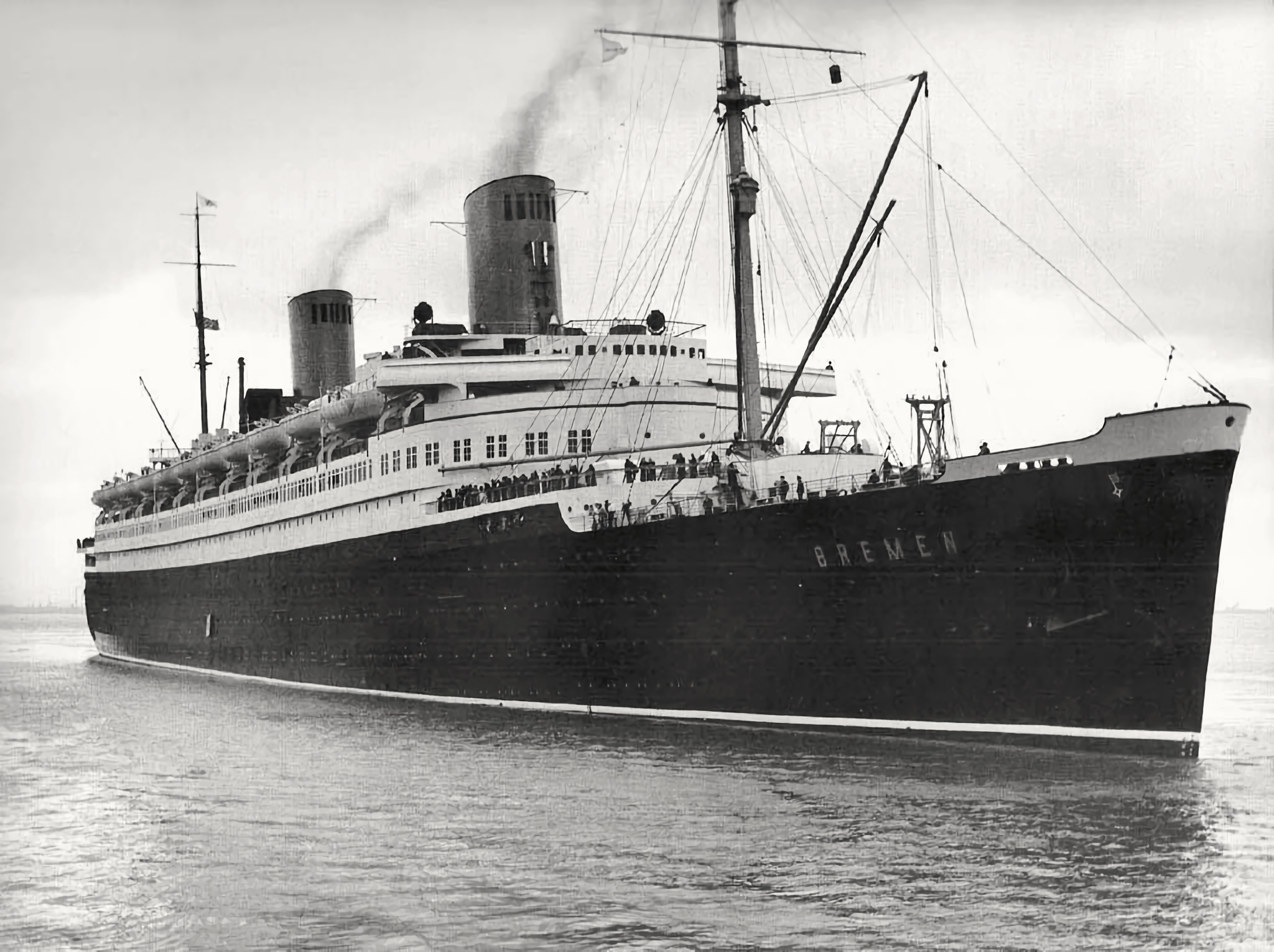
- SS Bremen in 1930s

History

Germany
- Name: Bremen
- Owner: Norddeutscher Lloyd
- Route: Bremerhaven-Southampton-Cherbourg-New York
- Builder: Deutsche Schiff- und Maschinenbau
- Laid down: 18 June 1927
- Launched: 16 August 1928
- Completed: 5 July 1929
- Maiden voyage: 16 July 1929
- Fate: Gutted by fire at Bremerhaven, 16–18 March 1941; scrapped to the waterline then towed up the River Weser to Nordenham and sunk by explosives, 1 April 1946; remains still visible at low tide.

General characteristics
- Tonnage: 51,656 GRT
- Displacement: 55,600 tons
- Length: 938.6 ft (286.1 m) oa; 905.5 ft (276.0 m) lwl; 888.12 ft (270.7 m) pp
- Beam: 101.9 ft (31.1 m)
- Draught: 31.72 ft (9.7 m) (design); 33.89 ft (10.3 m) (maximum)
- Depth: 71.5 ft (21.8 m) to promenade deck
- Installed power: Four sets of geared steam turbines generating 33,750 hp (25,170 kW) each; 135,000 shp (101,000 kW) maximum
- Propulsion: Quadruple propellers
- Speed: 27 knots (50 km/h; 31 mph) (design speed)
- Range: Approximately 6,000 nautical miles (11,000 km)
- Capacity: 2,139; 811 first class, 500 second class, 300 tourist class, 617 third class
- Crew: 966 total

SS Bremen was a German-built ocean liner constructed for the German shipping company Norddeutscher Lloyd (NDL) to work the transatlantic sea route. Launched in 1928, Bremen was notable for her high-speed engines and low, streamlined profile. At the time of her construction, she and her sister ship Europa were the two most advanced high-speed steam turbine ocean liners of their day. The German pair sparked an international competition in the building of large, fast, luxurious ocean liners that were national symbols and points of prestige during the pre-war years of the 1930s. She held the Blue Riband, and was the fourth ship of NDL to carry the name Bremen.

== History ==
Bremen and her sister were designed to have a cruising speed of 27.5 knots (50.9 km/h), allowing a crossing time of five days. This speed enabled Norddeutscher Lloyd to run regular weekly crossings with two ships; this type of service traditionally required three ships. It was claimed that Bremen briefly reached speeds of 32 knots (59 km/h) during her sea trials.

=== Design and construction ===
Bremen was built by the new German shipbuilding company Deutsche Schiff- und Maschinenbau. She was built from 7,000 tons of high-strength steel of 52 kg/m^{2} (500 N/m^{2}), allowing a weight saving of some 800 tons on the structure. She was also the first commercial ship to be designed with the Taylor bulbous bow, though bulbous bows of different types had appeared on earlier merchant vessels, such as SS Malolo of 1926. She was launched at Bremen during the afternoon of Thursday, 16 August 1928 by President Paul von Hindenburg, only one day after the launch of her sister ship Europa at Hamburg. SS Bremen and her sister ship Europa were considered for their time as the most modern liners in the world. The high speeds and the comfort and luxury level on board made high demands of technical personnel. Each ship required an engineering crew of some 170 men.

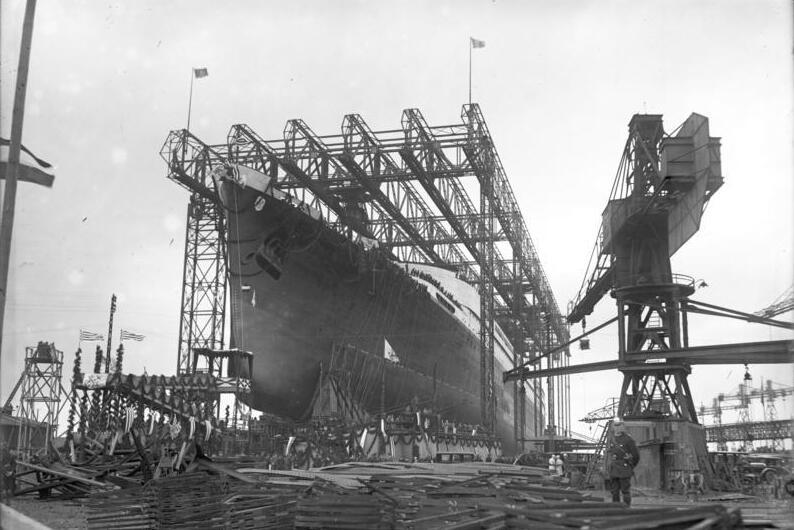
Bremen while under construction

As on her sister ship Europa, Bremen had a catapult on the upper deck between the two funnels with a small seaplane, which facilitated faster mail service. The aeroplane was launched from the ship several hours before arrival, landing at the seaplane base in Blexen.

The boiler and the machine equipment were designed by Professor Dr. Gustav Bauer. Bremen had four airtight boiler rooms. The combustion air for the oil burners of the boilers was blown into the boiler rooms by eight steam turbine blowers. The resulting positive pressure meant that the boiler rooms were accessible only through airlocks. The steam was generated in 20 oil-fired water tube boilers, eleven double-enders and nine single-enders in four banks fired by a total of 227 oil burners. The operating pressure was 23 atm = 24 bar with a steam temperature at the superheater discharge of 370 °C (698 °F). The maximum steam generating capacity was 500 tons/h. For harbour operation three boilers with their own blower were available, so that during work periods the main boiler room airlocks could remain open. The total heating surface amounted to 17,050 m^{2} (183,500 sq ft), the superheater surface 3,875 m^{2} (41,710 sq ft) and the air preheater surface 8,786 m^{2} (94,570 sq ft). The feed water was preheated to 130 °C (266 °F) and the fuel oil consumption was 33 tons/h or 380 g/HP/h or 800 tons/day, fed from oil bunkers with a capacity of 7,552 tons.

SS Bremen had four geared steam turbines that could generate approximately 135,000 shaft horsepower (101,000 kW). Each of them had a high pressure, a medium pressure, low pressure and a reverse turbine. In reverse, 65% of the forward power was available. At cruise speed the turbines made 1800 rpm while the propellers made 180 rpm for a power output of 84,000 shp (63,000 kW). The four propellers were bronze and had a diameter of 5,000 mm (197 in), pitch of 5,200 mm (205 in) and weighed 17 tons each. The 230 V electric power on the ship came from four diesel generators with a total output of 520 kW. On board, there were total of 420 electric motors, approximately 21,000 lamps, electric cookers and 20 elevators.

=== Blue Riband ===
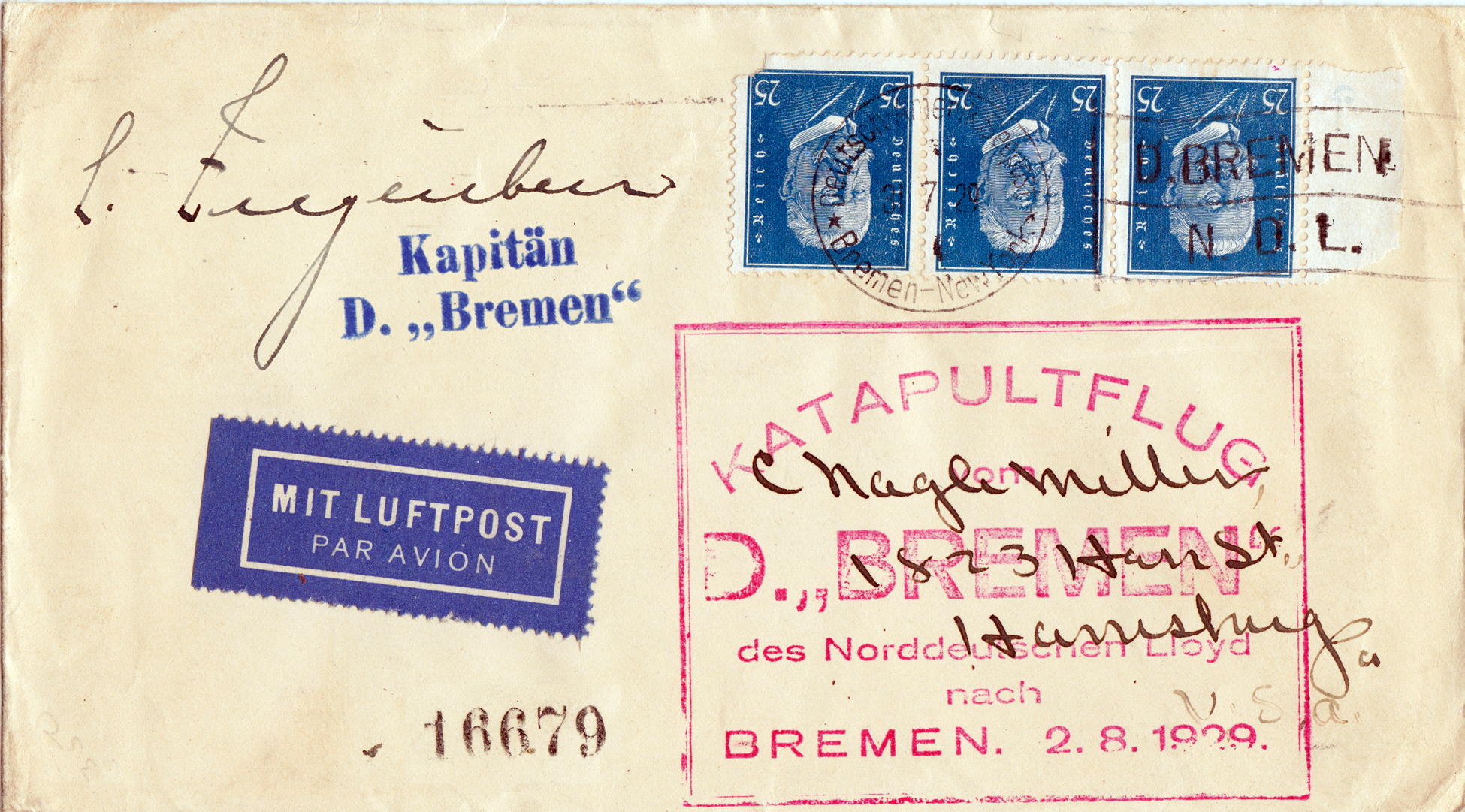
Cover flown from Bremen on 2 August 1929 signed by Capt. Ziegenbein

Bremen was to have made her maiden transatlantic crossing in the company of her sister Europa, but Europa suffered a serious fire during fitting-out, so Bremen crossed solo, departing Bremerhaven for New York City under the command of Commodore Leopold Ziegenbein on 16 July 1929. She arrived four days, 17 hours, and 42 minutes later, capturing the westbound Blue Riband from Mauretania with an average speed of 27.83 knots (51.54 km/h).

This voyage also marked the first time mail was carried by a ship-launched plane for delivery before the ship's arrival. A Heinkel HE 12 floatplane, flown by 27-year-old Luft Hansa pilot Baron Jobst von Studnitz, was launched at sea twenty miles east of Fire Island with 11,000 pieces of mail in six mailbags weighing 220 pounds (100 kg) which it delivered to New York many hours before the ship docked at the North German-Lloyd pier in Manhattan. On the return passage to Germany Bremen took the eastbound Blue Riband with a time of 4 days 14 hours and 30 minutes and an average speed of 27.91 knots (51.69 km/h), the first time a liner had broken two records on her first two passages. The mailplane was launched on the eastbound voyage in the English Channel near Cherbourg carrying 18,000 letters to Bremerhaven where it delivered the mail many hours ahead of the ship's arrival. Bremen lost the westbound Blue Riband to her sister Europa in 1930, and the eastbound Blue Riband to Italian SS Rex in 1932.

=== Before World War II ===
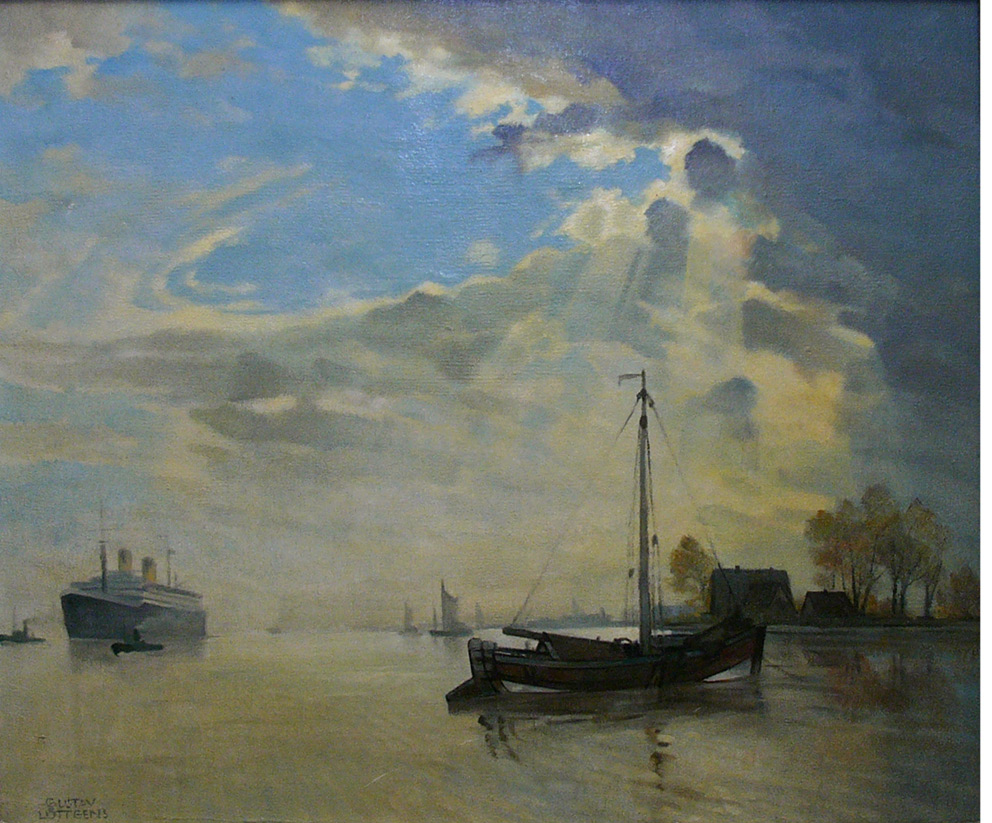
Bremen near Bremerhaven 1933. Oil painting by Gustav Lüttgens

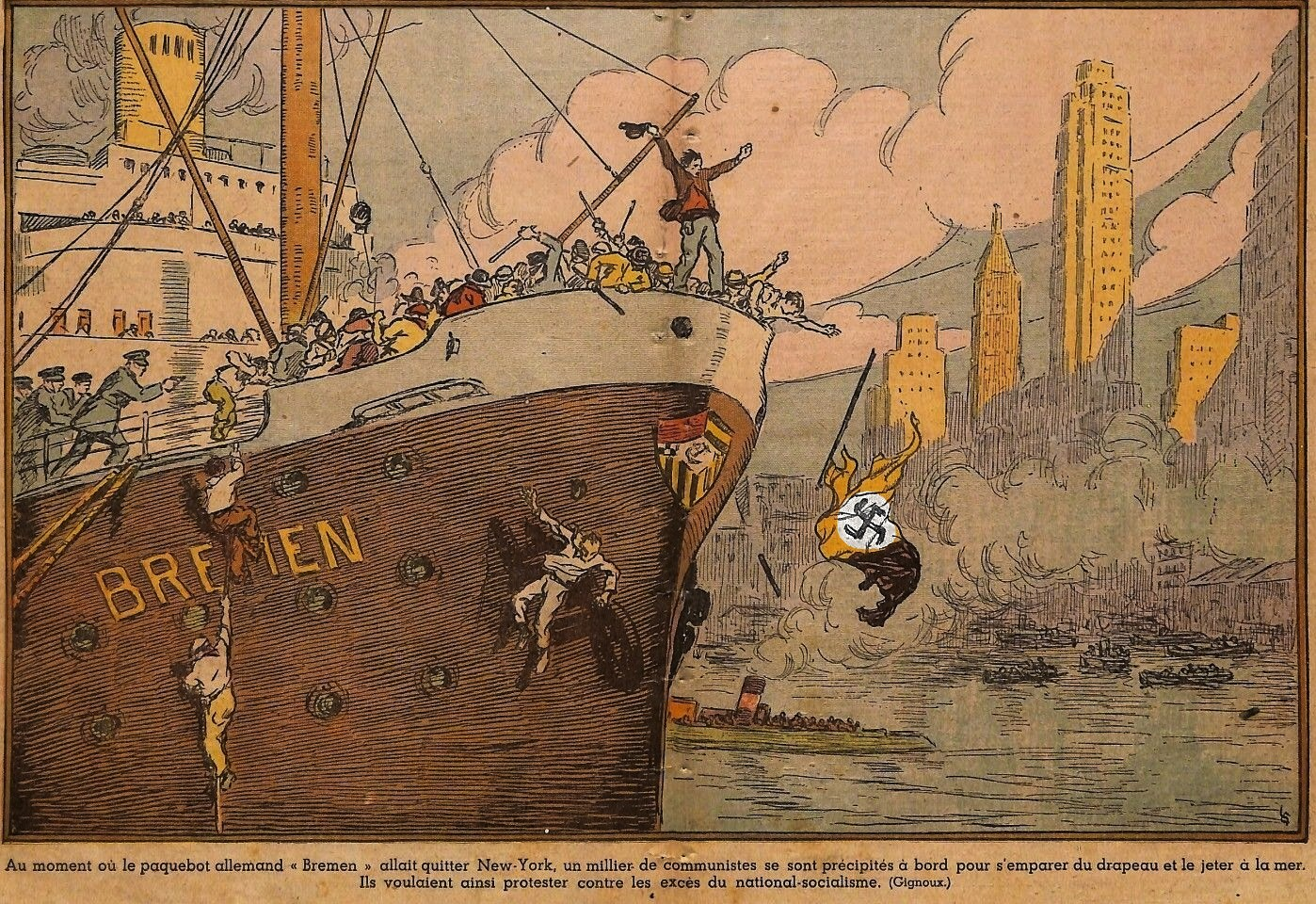
Illustration depicting anti-Nazi demonstrators attacking Bremen docked in New York Harbor, United States on 26 July 1935

As Nazism gained power in Germany, Bremen and her pier in New York were often the site of anti-Nazi demonstrations. On 26 July 1935, a group of anti-Nazi demonstrators, later dubbed "The Bremen Six", boarded Bremen just before she sailed and tore the Nazi flag from the jackstaff and tossed it into the Hudson River. The magistrate Louis B. Brodsky freed five of the six individuals, and justified their actions. At the time, there was a dual flag law, by which both the black-white-red horizontal tricolor (previously the flag of the German Empire), and the swastika flag were simultaneously official national flags of Germany. As the ship's swastika flag was the one tossed into the river, US authorities could say no symbol of Germany had been harmed. One of the six, Bill Bailey, later fought in the International Brigades during the Spanish Civil War.

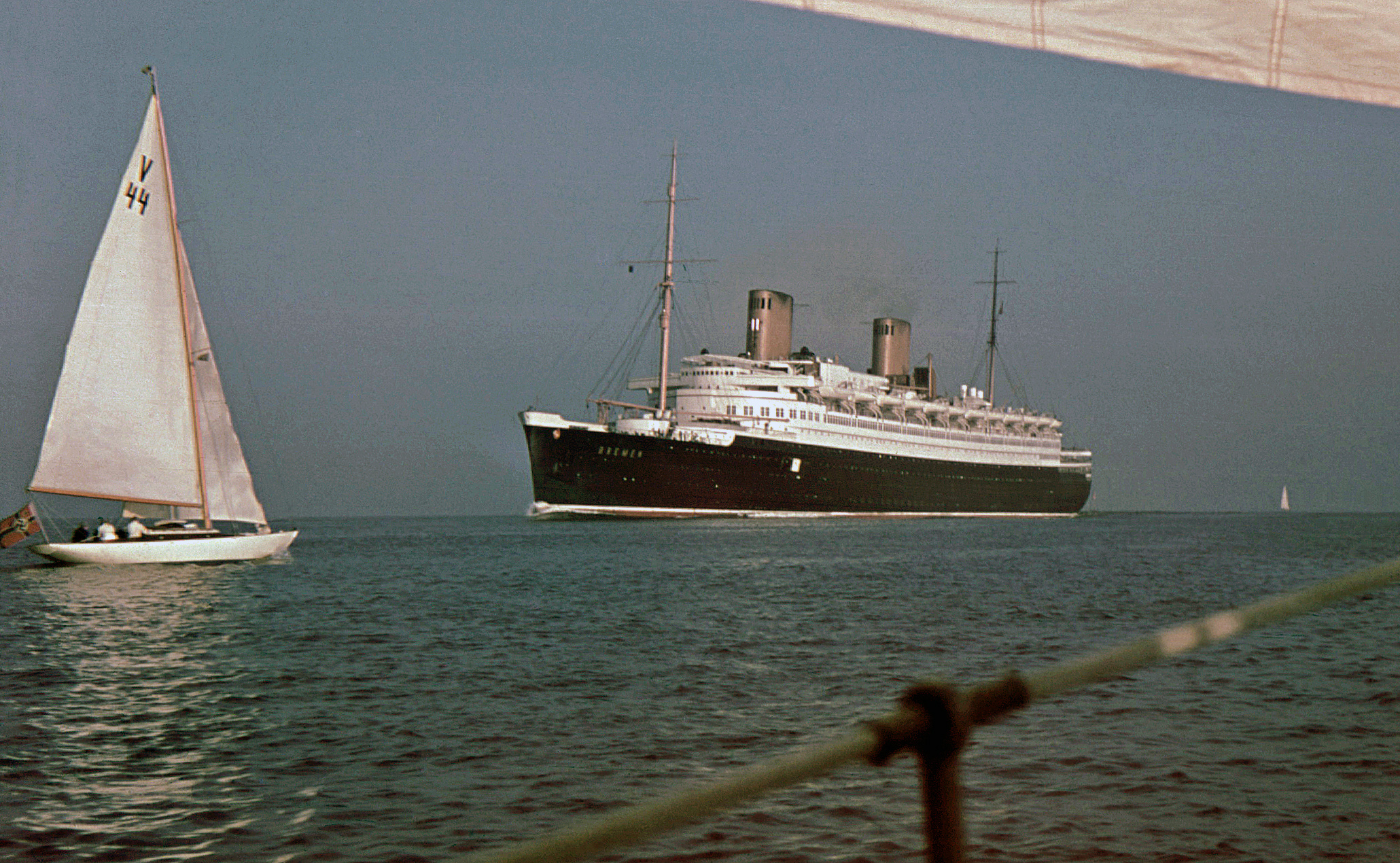
Bremen arriving at Bremerhaven in 1939

On 15 September 1935 Germany changed its flag law, removing the status of the black-white-red flag of imperial Germany, lest it be used by reactionaries. The Nazis on coming to power had used it as a co-national flag to replace the black-red-gold flag of the Weimar Republic.

Bremen started her South America cruise on 11 February 1939, and was the first ship of this size to traverse the Panama Canal. On 22 August 1939, she began her last voyage to New York. After ten years of service, she had almost 190 transatlantic voyages completed.

=== World War II ===
On 26 August 1939, in anticipation of the invasion of Poland, the Kriegsmarine high command ordered all German merchant ships to head to German ports immediately. Bremen was on a westbound crossing and two days from New York when she received the order. Bremen's captain decided to continue to New York to disembark her 1,770 passengers. During the few days in New York harbor, United States Customs Service agents conducted an unusually detailed inspection of the ship checking for weapons, contraband and ammunition, requiring the swimming pool to be drained and all shaft tunnels inspected. The ship was also required by U.S. authorities to engage in other activities that were uncommon at port, which effectively held it in port for days. During this period, the Bremen crew purchased paint and theater blackout paper while on furlough in New York City.

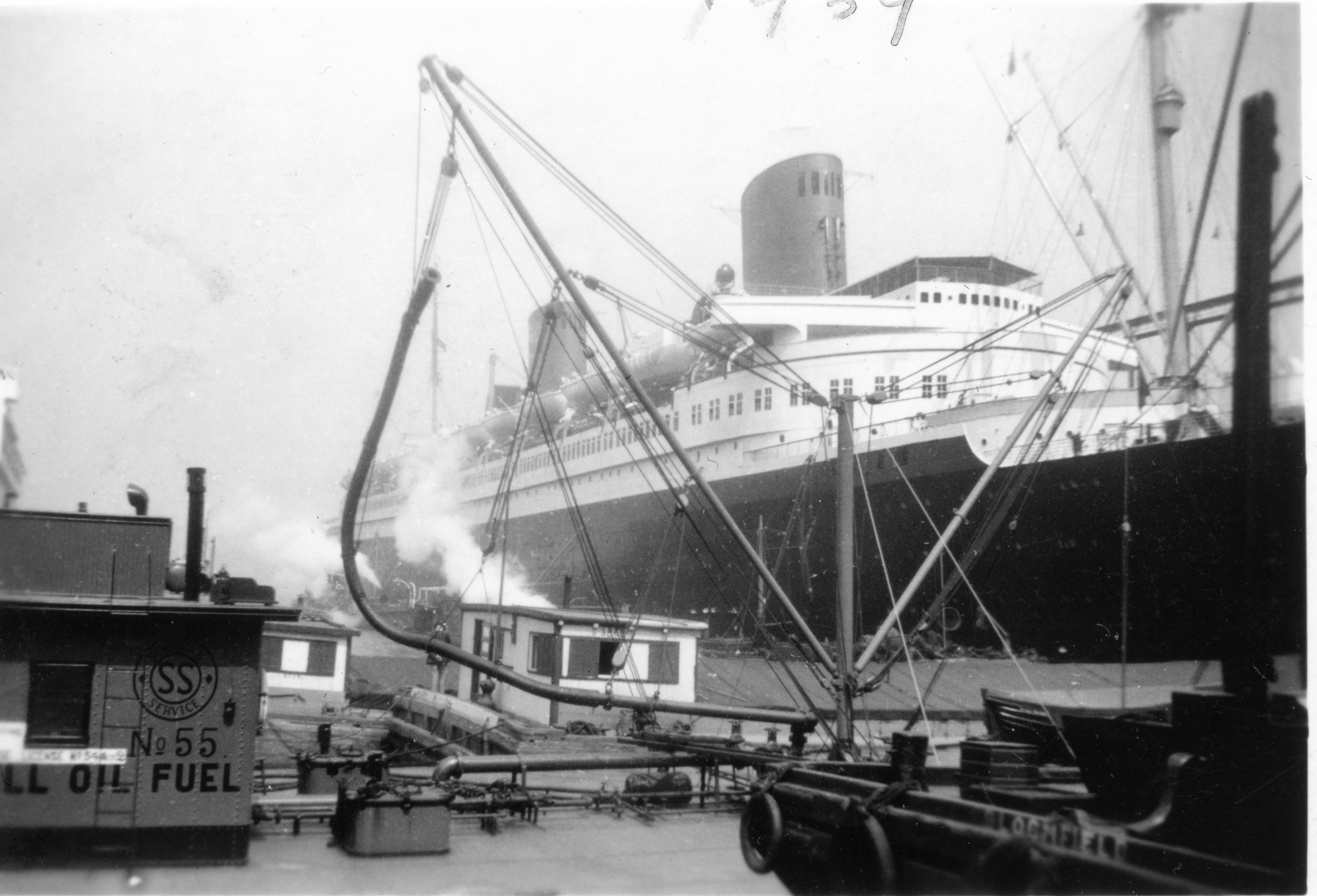
SS Bremen in NYC port Aug 28 1939

SS Bremen left New York without passengers on 30 August 1939 and at first opportunity accelerated to over 28 knots. On 1 September, coincident with the start of the Second World War, she was ordered to make for the Russian port of Murmansk. Underway, her crew painted the ship grey for camouflage and covered the portholes and windows. She made use of bad weather and high speed to avoid Royal Navy cruisers, arriving in Murmansk on 6 September 1939. With the outbreak of the Winter War between Finland and the Soviet Union, on 10 December 1939 Bremen made a dash to Bremerhaven, arriving on 13 December. On the way she was sighted and challenged by the S-class submarine HMS Salmon. A Dornier Do 18 seaplane escorting Bremen forced Salmon to dive for safety. Salmon's commander, Lieutenant Commander E. O. Bickford, decided not to torpedo the liner because he believed she was not a legal target. His decision not to fire on Bremen likely delayed the start of unrestricted submarine warfare.

Bremen was used as a barracks ship; there were plans to use her as a transport in Operation Sea Lion, the intended invasion of Great Britain.

== Fate ==
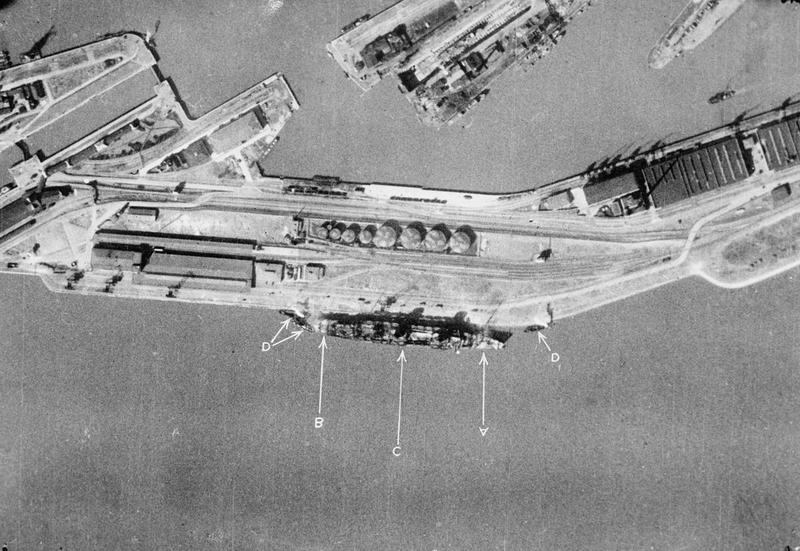
Reconnaissance photo of Bremen in Bremerhaven, still smoking after the fire

On 16 March 1941, Bremen was set alight by 14-year-old crew member Walter Schmidt while at her dock in Bremerhaven and completely gutted. A lengthy investigation discovered that the arson resulted from revenge stemming from a ship's officer who had punished him for not completing his assignment, not an act of war. Schmidt was later guillotined for the arson, becoming one of the youngest people to be judicially executed by the regime at age 15.

Starting in 1942 she was dismantled to the waterline so the steel could be used for munitions. In 1946 her remains were towed up the River Weser, beached on a sandbar off Blexen, Nordenham and destroyed by explosives, though some parts of the double hull remained as of 2012.

== Legacy ==
In 2004, a stamp was issued showing Bremen before the Manhattan skyline.

In 2004, Radio Bremen produced a one-hour radio feature, Königin der Meere – Die Geschichte des Schnelldampfers "Bremen" (Queen of the Seas - The story of the rapid steamer "Bremen") by Detlef Michelers, who included interviews with former stewards and elevator attendants of the Bremen.

In the stairwell in the Übersee Museum Bremen, there is a 1:100 scale model of Bremen, while in the shipping exhibit there is a model of her significantly smaller earlier namesake to the same scale.

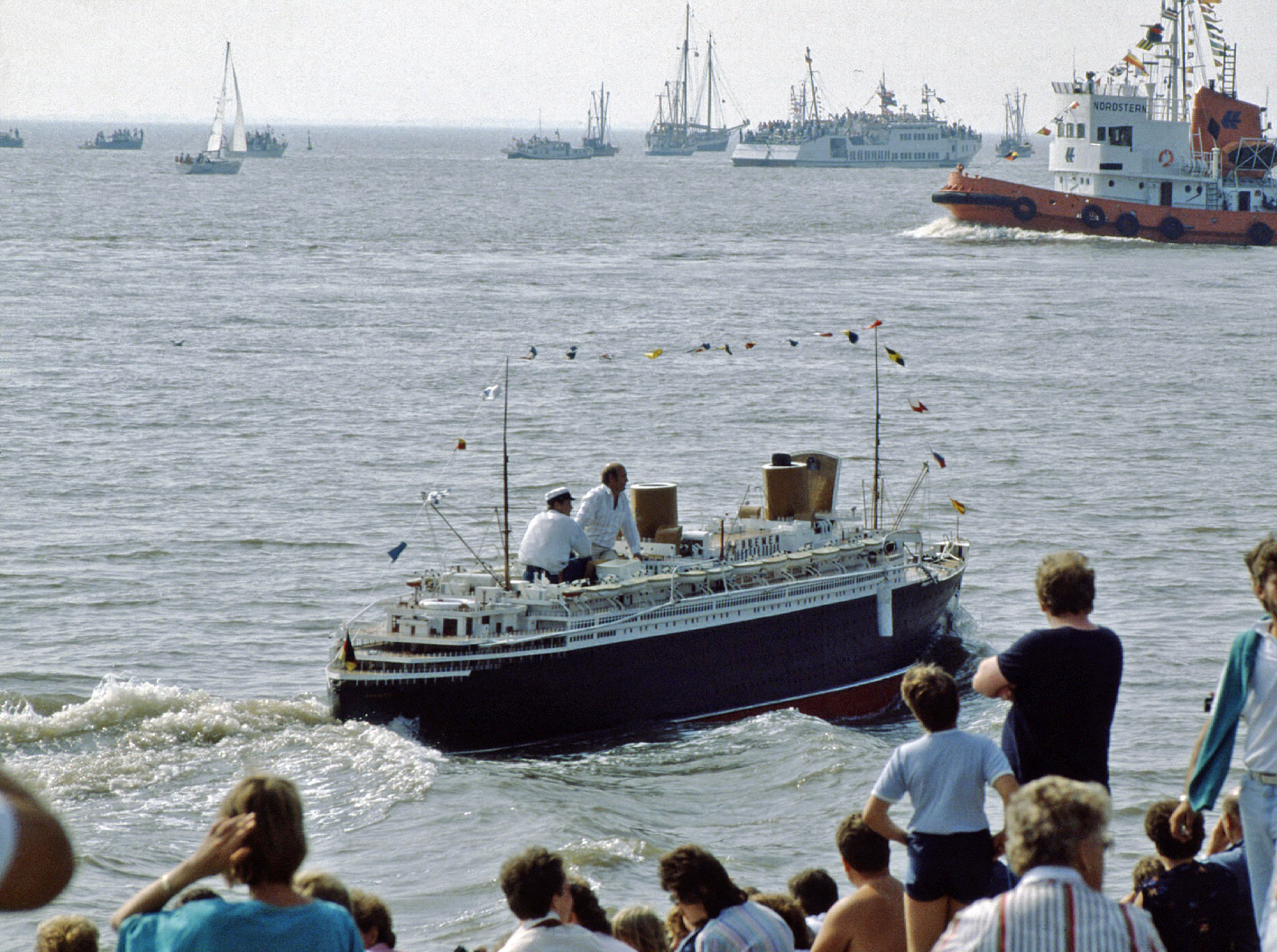
Bremen IV, Junior in Bremerhaven

A much larger, 39-foot-long (12 m) model of the Bremen, known officially as Bremen IV, Junior, was built between 1949 and 1962 by enthusiasts Günter Bos and Günter Buse. The 10-ton model, operated by a two-person crew inside, would tour the world, and achieve a Guinness World Record for largest seaworthy model ship. It currently resides at Technik Museum Speyer.

== View of Bremen ==
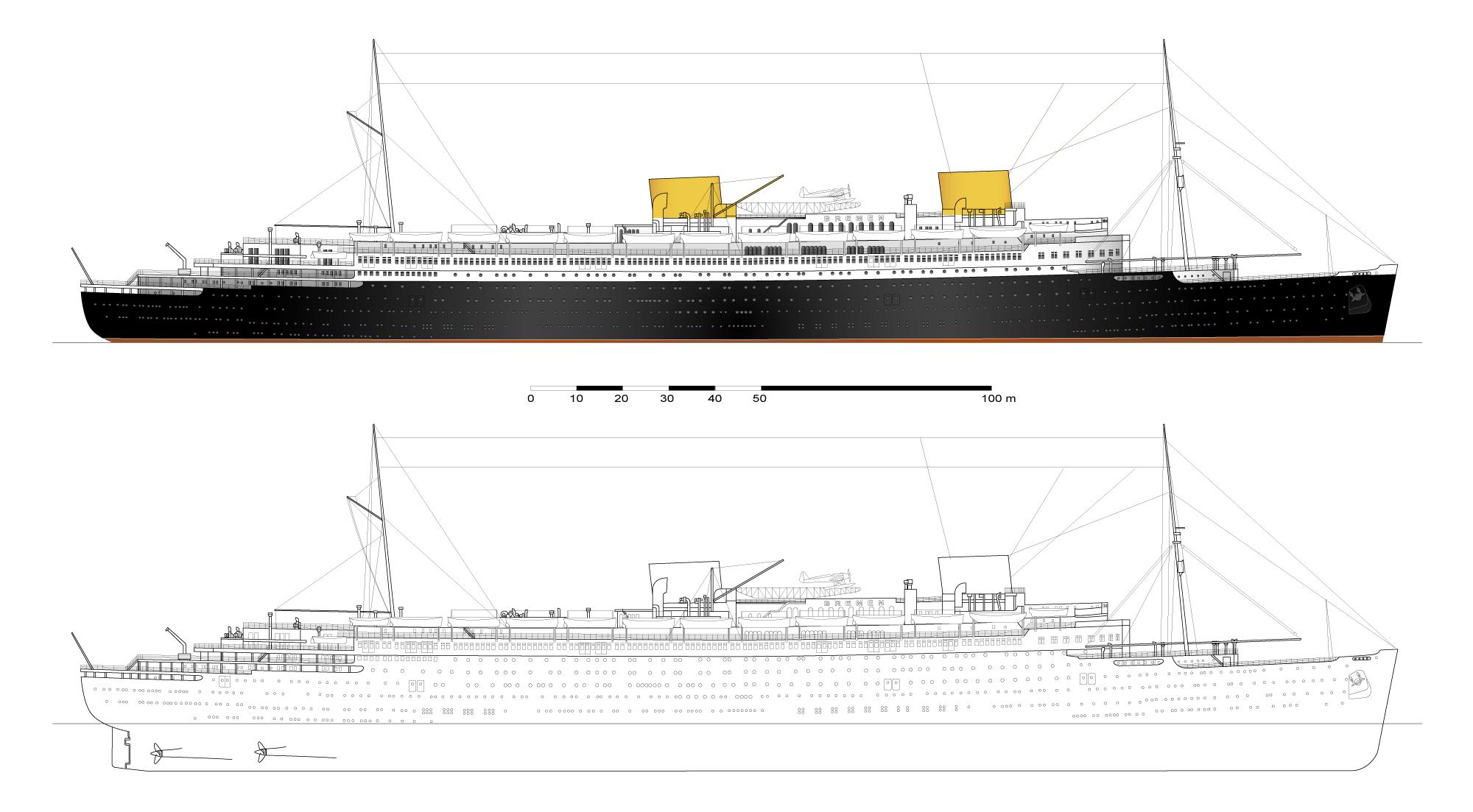
The profile of Bremen as originally built - the funnels were raised by five meters in 1930.

Records
Preceded by Mauretania	Holder of the Blue Riband (Westbound record); 1929 – 1930	Succeeded by Europa
Preceded by Mauretania	Blue Riband (Eastbound record); 1929 – 1935	Succeeded by Normandie
