= March 1936 =

Month of 1936

<<	March 1936					>>
Su	Mo	Tu	We	Th	Fr	Sa
1	2	3	4	5	6	7
8	9	10	11	12	13	14
15	16	17	18	19	20	21
22	23	24	25	26	27	28
29	30	31

The following events occurred in March 1936:

== March 1, 1936 (Sunday) ==
- Legislative elections were held in Argentina. The National Democratic Party remained the largest faction with 55 of 158 seats.
- German Minister of Postal Affairs Paul Freiherr von Eltz-Rübenach opened the first videophone conversation.
- The SS California strike began in San Pedro, California.

== March 2, 1936 (Monday) ==
- The League of Nations' Committee of Eighteen met in Geneva to renew discussions on expanding sanctions against Italy to include an oil embargo. France was opposed to the idea, believing it would not work and would only result in Italy quitting the League. The meeting adjourned with another agreement to make a last diplomatic attempt to bring about peace.
- The Dominican Republic National Police was formed.
- German wrestler Dick Shikat defeated Danno O'Mahony by submission at Madison Square Garden to win the National Wrestling Association World Heavyweight Championship.
- Born: Alan Scott, blacksmith and baker, in Toorak, Victoria, Australia (d. 2009)
- Died: Donald Alexander Mackenzie, 62, Scottish journalist and folklorist

== March 3, 1936 (Tuesday) ==
- The Italian government had the four largest banks in the country declared public banks.

== March 4, 1936 (Wednesday) ==
- A British Red Cross ambulance was bombed by Italian warplanes on the Korem plain in Ethiopia, killing seven patients.
- The espionage trial of Hermann Görtz began in the Old Bailey.
- The airship LZ 129 Hindenburg had its first flight.
- The SS California strike ended when Secretary of Labor Frances Perkins agreed to arrange a grievance hearing and guarantee the strikers they would face no reprisals.
- Born: Jim Clark, racing driver, in Kilmany, Scotland (d. 1968); Aribert Reimann, pianist and accompanist, in Berlin, Germany (d. 2024)

== March 5, 1936 (Thursday) ==
- The 8th Academy Awards were held in Los Angeles. Mutiny on the Bounty won Best Picture.
- The Supermarine Spitfire fighter plane had its first flight.
- Born: Dean Stockwell, actor, in North Hollywood, Los Angeles, California (d. 2021)

== March 6, 1936 (Friday) ==
- Adolf Hitler summoned the Reichstag for Saturday at noon. International speculation abounded as to what the purpose of the session might be, as all that was announced for the agenda was "acceptance of a declaration of the German government."
- Yugoslavian Prime Minister Milan Stojadinović survived an assassination attempt when a Macedonian deputy shot at him on the floor of the Chamber. Stojadinović was unhurt as another deputy struck the assailant's arm and caused the shots to go wild.
- Born: Marion Barry, civil rights activist and politician, in Itta Bena, Mississippi (d. 2014)
- Died: Rubin Goldmark, 63, American composer

== March 7, 1936 (Saturday) ==
- The Remilitarization of the Rhineland took place when German forces entered the Rhineland in violation of the Treaty of Versailles.
- In the Reichstag, Hitler announced the renunciation of the Locarno Treaties and then called for new elections on March 29 which he intended to prove that the German people were behind him.
- Douglas Fairbanks and Sylvia Ashley were married in Paris.
- Born: Loren Acton, astronaut, in Lewistown, Montana

== March 8, 1936 (Sunday) ==
- Spanish army officers including Emilio Mola and Francisco Franco held a secret meeting in Madrid to discuss launching a coup against the government.
- International Radio of Serbia was launched.
- The first stock car race occurred in Daytona Beach, Florida. Milt Marion would be declared the winner with an average speed of just over 52 mph. This race ultimately helped Daytona motorsports evolve into what it has become today, allowing the sports of IMSA, NASCAR, and others to thrive with the famed Daytona International Speedway.
- Born: Sue Ane Langdon, actress, in Paterson, New Jersey

== March 9, 1936 (Monday) ==
- Official authorization of the Great Purge in the Soviet Union, the arrest and execution of thousands of political opponents of Joseph Stalin, began with the Politburo of the Soviet Communist Party approving the resolution "Measures for Protecting the USSR from infiltration of spies, terrorist and diversion elements." Nikolai Yezhov, Secretary of the Party's Central Committee became the chairman of a special commission to purge all persons believed to be spying against the Party.
- British Foreign Secretary Anthony Eden told the House of Commons that Germany's actions "have profoundly shaken confidence in any engagement into which the government of Germany may in future enter", but said there was "no reason to suppose that the present German action implies a threat of hostilities."
- Kōki Hirota became the 32nd Prime Minister of Japan.
- Hermann Görtz was sentenced to four years in prison for espionage.
- Born: Mickey Gilley, country musician, in Natchez, Mississippi (d. 2022); Tom Sestak, American football player, in Gonzales, Texas (d. 1987)

== March 10, 1936 (Tuesday) ==
- France increased its military presence along the Maginot Line.
- In Granada, Spain, at least seven people were killed during rioting by leftists. In Pamplona, in a clash between peasants and soldiers four were killed.
- The Republican Party presidential primaries began in the United States.
- Born: Sepp Blatter, President of FIFA, in Visp, Switzerland

== March 11, 1936 (Wednesday) ==
- 5 nations agreed to support France in a protest to the League of Nations against Germany's remilitarization of the Rhineland.
- Italy announced that as long as Britain and France continued to apply sanctions, it would not co-operate with any measures they took against Germany.
- Rafael Franco proclaimed a dictatorship over Paraguay.
- Born: Ralph Abernathy, civil rights leader, in Linden, Alabama (d. 1990); Antonin Scalia, Associate Justice of the U.S. Supreme Court, in Trenton, New Jersey (d. 2016)
- Died: David Beatty, 1st Earl Beatty, 65, British admiral

== March 12, 1936 (Thursday) ==
- Britain, France, Belgium and Italy (the signatories of the Locarno Treaties besides Germany) formally protested against the German government's renunciation of the Locarno Pact. The League of Nations also noted it as a violation of international law.
- Germany threatened to enter a state of "honourable isolation" and increase its military presence in the Rhineland if France and Belgium continued to mass troops on their eastern borders.

== March 13, 1936 (Friday) ==
- Leftist rioters burned down churches and a newspaper plant in Madrid.
- 18 died in flooding across the northeastern United States and Canada.

== March 14, 1936 (Saturday) ==
- The Falange was banned in Spain. Police arrested 200 Fascists who were accused of using violence to stir up the recent outbreaks of rioting, including José Antonio Primo de Rivera.

== March 15, 1936 (Sunday) ==
- Hitler set two conditions before Germany would agree to send an envoy to a conference on the Rhineland dispute. First, Germany would have equal rights with those of the other powers present. Second, the powers would immediately enter negotiations for peace pacts with Germany. France was infuriated by the second condition and insisted that no such peace proposals could be discussed until German troops were withdrawn from the Rhineland.
- Serge Mdivani of the aristocratic Mdivani family was killed in a polo accident in Delray Beach, Florida.
- Born: Howard Greenfield, songwriter, in Brooklyn, New York (d. 1986)

== March 16, 1936 (Monday) ==
- The character Eugene the Jeep first appeared in the comic strip Thimble Theatre (later known as Popeye after the strip's best-known character).
- The U.S. Supreme Court decided Wisconsin v. Michigan.
- The Wehrmacht Long Service Award was established in Nazi Germany.
- Born: Raymond Vahan Damadian, physician and inventor, in New York City (d. 2022)
- Died: Marguerite Durand, 72, French stage actress, journalist and suffragette

== March 17, 1936 (Tuesday) ==
- The Pittsburgh Flood of 1936 was the worst flood in the city's history. At least 10 were dead in nearby Johnstown.
- Soviet Foreign Affairs Minister Maxim Litvinov told the League of Nations that it would become a "laughing stock" and could not be preserved "if it does not carry out its own decisions, but to the contrary accustoms the aggressor to ignore its recommendations, its admonitions and its warnings." Litvinov expressed skepticism of Hitler's proposals for peace, pointing out that the Locarno Treaties already represented just such a pact.
- Born: Patty Maloney, actress, in Perkinsville, New York (d. 2025)

== March 18, 1936 (Wednesday) ==
- Pittsburgh was without electricity and at least 57 were dead as flood waters in the region reached an all-time high of 46 feet.
- The Soviet Union and Turkey extended their treaty of friendship and mutual assistance for another 10 years.
- German envoy Joachim von Ribbentrop and a large entourage arrived in London ahead of a League of Nations council meeting on the Rhineland dispute.
- The drama film These Three starring Miriam Hopkins, Merle Oberon and Joel McCrea was released.
- Born: F. W. de Klerk, State President of South Africa, in Johannesburg (d. 2021)
- Died: Eleftherios Venizelos, 71, seven-time Prime Minister of Greece

== March 19, 1936 (Thursday) ==
- The known death toll in the flooding across twelve U.S. states rose to 150.
- President Roosevelt appealed for donations to the American Red Cross to help flood victims.
- In London, the Council of the League of Nations formally condemned Germany as a breaker of treaties. Joachim von Ribbentrop had pleaded for the delegates to delay the vote and take more time to consider Germany's peace offer, to no avail.
- Italy and Albania signed a new series of economic agreements between the two countries.
- Born: Ursula Andress, actress and model, in Ostermundigen, Switzerland

== March 20, 1936 (Friday) ==
- The Polish government backed down on its plan to outlaw kosher slaughtering of animals. An amendment to the bill was passed allowing religious communities to slaughter animals according to their practice.
- Born: Lee "Scratch" Perry, reggae producer, in Kendal, Jamaica (d. 2021)

== March 21, 1936 (Saturday) ==
- President Roosevelt allocated $25 million for flood relief in addition to the $18.4 million already allotted through emergency funds.
- The Noël Coward one-act play Star Chamber premiered in London.
- Born: Ed Broadbent, politician and political scientist, in Oshawa, Canada (d. 2024)
- Died: Alexander Glazunov, 70, Russian composer

== March 22, 1936 (Sunday) ==
- Italian warplanes bombed Jijiga for more than an hour in the most intense aerial bombardment of the war to date.
- The musical drama film The Great Ziegfeld premiered in Los Angeles.

== March 23, 1936 (Monday) ==
- Mussolini created the National Council of Guilds, representing 23 professional corporations. All large private industries in the country were nationalized.
- The League of Nations Committee of Thirteen called upon the International Committee of the Red Cross to supply any information it could offer regarding accusations of Italian troops using poison gas in Ethiopia. The Red Cross denied the request, explaining that the "neutrality which the International Red Cross Committee is bound to observe makes it necessary for the Committee to exercise very great discretion."
- Died: Oscar Asche, 65, Australian actor, director and writer

== March 24, 1936 (Tuesday) ==
- Germany rejected a settlement plan offered by the other four Locarno signatories due to "inequalities". Hitler said he would offer counterproposals after Sunday's elections.
- The longest game in National Hockey League history was played in Game 1 of a best-of-five semifinal between the Detroit Red Wings and Montreal Maroons. After 176 minutes and 30 seconds of play, Detroit's Mud Bruneteau scored in the sixth period of overtime at 2:25 the next morning to win the game, 1-0.
- The RMS Queen Mary ran aground twice at Clydebank, despite the River Clyde having been specially dredged beforehand.
- The Robert E. Sherwood play Idiot's Delight premiered at the Shubert Theatre in New York City.
- Born: David Suzuki, science journalist and environmental activist, in Vancouver, British Columbia, Canada
- Died: Henry Boyle Townshend Somerville, 72, British navy officer (murdered by the IRA)

== March 25, 1936 (Wednesday) ==
- Britain, France and the United States signed the Second London Naval Treaty, limiting tonnage and gun size for each ship category. However, the restrictions were slight and the agreement had many loopholes.
- International Committee of the Red Cross President Max Huber went to Rome to discuss an investigation of the Italian bombing of Red Cross units. Italy set its conditions: the question of poison gas would be excluded from any investigation, no Ethiopians could participate and Italy could not appear to be standing trial. Huber left with a promise from Mussolini to respect the Red Cross flag, but nothing more.
- Genrikh Yagoda, Director of the Soviet Union's NKVD intelligence agency, submitted a proposal to the Politburo for sending "all the Trotskyists" to "remote camps" mostly to be located in sparsely populated Siberia. The Politburo approved Yagoda's proposal on May 20.

== March 26, 1936 (Thursday) ==
- A plane crash in Mexico killed 14 people. Ten of the dead were European tourists, among them Prince Adolf of Schaumburg-Lippe and his wife. It was the worst crash in Mexican aviation history at the time.
- Rutgers University Press was founded.
- Born: Harry Kalas, sportscaster, in Naperville, Illinois (d. 2009); Maria Ines Ulloa de Navas, Queen of Navas dynasty (d. natural causes, 2018) (Bogota, Col)
- Died: Adolf II, Prince of Schaumburg-Lippe, 53 (plane crash)

== March 27, 1936 (Friday) ==
- Reynoldstown won the Grand National horse race for the second straight year.

== March 28, 1936 (Saturday) ==
- José Antonio Primo de Rivera was sentenced to two months in prison for insulting the Spanish Chief of Police.
- Born: Mario Vargas Llosa, Peruvian writer, politician and Nobel laureate, in Arequipa, Peru (d. 2025)

== March 29, 1936 (Sunday) ==
- Parliamentary elections were held in Germany. No opposition parties were allowed and the Nazis claimed almost 99% of the vote. Polling booths were established in the air for the first time in history, as the Hindenburg and Graf Zeppelin cruised over the Saar and Rhineland all day long as passengers and crew voted.
- Two large squadrons of Italian bombers pounded Harar for two and a half hours, setting the city ablaze. Ethiopian Red Cross and Egyptian Red Crescent hospitals were also bombed despite being clearly marked and set off some distance from the city.

== March 30, 1936 (Monday) ==
- The Palestine Broadcasting Service was inaugurated.
- Iran informed the U.S. State Department that it was closing its diplomatic and consular offices in the country due to treatment of Iranian subjects in the American press. The controversy stemmed from an incident the previous October when Iranian diplomat Ghaffer Djalal was arrested for speeding. Despite Djalal's claims that his diplomatic immunity was violated, comments in the American press said that even diplomats should obey speed laws.

== March 31, 1936 (Tuesday) ==
- Italians won the Battle of Maychew and achieved complete victory on Ethiopia's northern front.
- The Hindenburg began its first transatlantic crossing.
- Born: Marge Piercy, poet, novelist and activist, in Detroit, Michigan; Bob Pulford, ice hockey player, in Newton Robinson, Ontario, Canada
