= June 1936 =

Month of 1936

<<	June 1936					>>
Su	Mo	Tu	We	Th	Fr	Sa
	1	2	3	4	5	6
7	8	9	10	11	12	13
14	15	16	17	18	19	20
21	22	23	24	25	26	27
28	29	30

The following events occurred in June 1936:

== June 1, 1936 (Monday) ==
- The RMS Queen Mary steamed into New York Harbor to complete her maiden voyage. The crossing was completed in 4 days 12 hours and 24 minutes – 42 minutes shy of the speed record set by the Normandie last year.
- The Reichsmusikkammer decreed that using pseudonyms to hide foreign-sounding names without getting approval from the organization were illegal, effective immediately. Violations were punishable by fines or disbarment.
- The Italian African Police was created.
- Born: Gerald Scarfe, cartoonist and illustrator, in St. John's Wood, London, England

== June 2, 1936 (Tuesday) ==
- Nicaraguan President Juan Bautista Sacasa was overthrown by a revolt of the National Guard led by Anastasio Somoza García.
- Hungarian police arrested 770 Hungarian National Socialists and charged them with treason for plotting a putsch against the government.

== June 3, 1936 (Wednesday) ==
- Haile Selassie arrived by special train at London Waterloo station to a huge crowd cheering and displaying welcome banners.
- A series of strikes across France took on the character of a general strike.
- Died: Walther Wever, 48, German Luftwaffe general (plane accident)

== June 4, 1936 (Thursday) ==
- Léon Blum became Prime Minister of France. Blum immediately had a crisis on his hands when a wave of strikes across the country took on the character of a general strike.
- In Mińsk Mazowiecki, Poland, a total of 50 Jews were reported wounded after several days of anti-Semitic rioting. The violence stemmed from an alleged incident on May 31 when a Jew reportedly killed a Polish sergeant in a drunken brawl. A synagogue and many Jewish homes and shops were set ablaze during the riots.
- Born: Bruce Dern, actor, in Chicago, Illinois
- Died: Joseph W. Byrns, Sr., 66, American politician

== June 5, 1936 (Friday) ==
- Sir Samuel Hoare, who had resigned as Foreign Secretary in December over the Hoare–Laval Pact fiasco, returned to Stanley Baldwin's cabinet as First Lord of the Admiralty to replace the retiring Viscount Monsell.

== June 6, 1936 (Saturday) ==
- The British Union of Fascists held a rally in Hyde Park, London to protest against Haile Selassie's presence in the country.
- Tony Manero won the U.S. Open golf tournament.
- Granville won the Belmont Stakes horse race.

== June 7, 1936 (Sunday) ==
- The Matignon Agreements were signed to end the French general strike.
- A general election was held in Panama. Juan Demóstenes Arosemena was elected president.
- A victory parade was staged in Rome for thousands of troops returning from the Second Italo-Ethiopian War.
- Lucky Luciano was convicted on 62 counts of participating in a prostitution ring.

== June 8, 1936 (Monday) ==
- 42 were killed in Bucharest when two crowded grandstands collapsed during a Boy Scout rally. Members of the royal family including King Carol II and son Michael witnessed the tragedy but were uninjured.
- A bomb blast at the Jaffa Gate in Jerusalem wounded 25.
- Born: James Darren, actor, director and singer, in Philadelphia, Pennsylvania (d. 2024)
- Died: John Hays Hammond, 81, American mining engineer, diplomat and philanthropist

== June 9, 1936 (Tuesday) ==
- The 1936 Republican National Convention opened in Cleveland, Ohio.
- Mussolini made a cabinet reshuffle relinquishing three of his eight posts. Son-in-law Galeazzo Ciano was made Foreign Minister, the youngest in Italian history at age 33.
- A presidential election was held in Nicaragua as part of a military coup. Carlos Alberto Brenes became Provisional President.

== June 10, 1936 (Wednesday) ==
- Herbert Hoover spoke at the Republican National Convention, slamming President Roosevelt for increasing the national debt and preaching what Hoover called "the gospel of class hatred." The delegates yelled and cheered in what The New York Times called "a wild and uncontrollable burst of frenzy."

== June 11, 1936 (Thursday) ==
- The Republican Party unanimously nominated Governor of Kansas Alf Landon as its candidate for president.
- The Coppa Italia Final was played for the first time since 1922. Torino defeated Alessandria 5-1.
- James Henry Thomas resigned his seat in the British House of Commons over the budget leak scandal.
- The London International Surrealist Exhibition opened in England.
- Died: Robert E. Howard, 30, American pulp fiction writer and creator of Conan the Barbarian (suicide)

== June 12, 1936 (Friday) ==
- Frank Knox was selected as the Republican vice presidential nominee on the final day of the National Convention.
- 18 Jews were wounded in a train bombing at Qalqilya.

== June 13, 1936 (Saturday) ==
- 100,000 marched in Guangzhou in an anti-Japanese demonstration.
- The government of Palestine empowered civil courts to hand out the death penalty for rioting, bomb throwing, firing at soldiers or interfering with activities at harbours and railroads.

== June 14, 1936 (Sunday) ==
- Despite the new laws allowing for the death penalty, Arab snipers wounded 5 Jews on the Jaffa highway and Jericho road. Troops escorting a Jewish convoy returned fire.
- 120,000 Belgian miners decided to go on strike.
- Died: G. K. Chesterton, 62, English writer and critic; Hans Poelzig, 67, German architect, painter and set designer

== June 15, 1936 (Monday) ==
- A munitions factory explosion near Tallinn, Estonia killed about 40 people.
- Giovanni Mercati and Eugène Tisserant were made cardinals by Pope Pius XI.
- The Commodity Exchange Act was enacted in the United States.
- The Vickers Wellington bomber plane made its first flight.

== June 16, 1936 (Tuesday) ==
- Belgian troops were ordered to be mobilized to protect public services as thousands more workmen joined the miners already out on strike.
- José María Gil-Robles y Quiñones stood in the Cortes Generales and read out statistics, which he challenged the government to disprove, showing that in the last 48 hours, 65 people had been killed, 36 churches had been destroyed by fire and 34 more severely damaged. Prime Minister Quiroga did not dispute the statistics but blamed the country's strife on fascists.
- 24 died when a ferry sank in the Danube at Budapest.
- Havørn Accident: A Junkers Ju 52 crashed into the mountain Lihesten in Norway, killing all 7 aboard. It was the first fatal aviation accident in Norway.

== June 17, 1936 (Wednesday) ==
- The Supreme Court of Canada ruled that most of the New Deal-inspired legislation passed by the previous Prime Minister R. B. Bennett was invalid.
- Heinrich Himmler was appointed Chief of the German Police.
- Born: Ken Loach, film and television director, in Nuneaton, Warwickshire, England
- Died: Henry B. Walthall, 58, American stage and film actor

== June 18, 1936 (Thursday) ==
- Anthony Eden told the British House of Commons that there was "no longer any utility" in continuing sanctions against Italy, causing cries of "Shame!" and "Treachery!" to ring out from the Labour benches. Eden explained that the decision was made to prevent the European situation from deteriorating. Prime Minister Stanley Baldwin said his government was "hoping to bring the French, the Germans and ourselves into conference for the better security of the peace of Europe. The part that Germany can play for good or for evil in Europe is immense, and if we believe the opportunity is presented, let us do what we can to use it for good."
- The first in a series of six articles by Miguel Maura appeared in the leading Madrid newspaper El Sol calling for a multiparty "national Republican dictatorship" to save Spain from descending into anarchy.
- The Joe Louis vs. Max Schmeling fight at Yankee Stadium was postponed 24 hours due to rain.
- Born: Ronald Venetiaan, President of Suriname, in Paramaribo; Dick Wimmer, author, in New York City (d. 2011)
- Died: Maxim Gorky, 68, Russian writer and political activist

== June 19, 1936 (Friday) ==
- Max Schmeling knocked out Joe Louis in the 12th round of their bout at Yankee Stadium in front of 39,878. Schmeling's victory was considered a significant upset.
- The Irish Free State declared the Irish Republican Army illegal.
- Axel Pehrsson-Bramstorp became 24th Prime Minister of Sweden.
- Born: Takeshi Aono, actor, in Asahikawa, Hokkaido, Japan (d. 2012)

== June 20, 1936 (Saturday) ==
- President Roosevelt lifted the restrictions the United States had placed against Italy and Ethiopia under the Neutrality Act.
- Born: Harold E. Puthoff, electrical engineer and parapsychologist, in Chicago, Illinois

== June 21, 1936 (Sunday) ==
- The 74th United States Congress adjourned sine die at 12:39 a.m. Congress would not meet again until after the November elections.
- Real Madrid beat Barcelona 2-1 in the Copa del Presidente de la República Final. The tournament would not be held again until 1939 due to the Spanish Civil War.
- Born: Joseph Gosnell, Nisga'a leader, in Arrandale, British Columbia, Canada (d. 2020)

== June 22, 1936 (Monday) ==
- A conference opened in Montreaux to discuss Turkey's request to be allowed to refortify the Dardanelles.
- President Roosevelt signed the Flood Control Act into law.
- Honduras notified the League of Nations of its intention to withdraw from the organization.
- Nazi Germany introduced the death penalty for the crime of kidnapping for purposes of extortion.
- Born: Kris Kristofferson, singer-songwriter and actor, in Brownsville, Texas (d. 2024)
- Died: Moritz Schlick, 54, German philosopher and physicist

== June 23, 1936 (Tuesday) ==
- The 1936 Democratic National Convention opened in Philadelphia.
- Al Capone was stabbed in the back by fellow Alcatraz inmate James C. Lucas with a blade from a pair of barber's shears, but the wound was not serious.
- Maryse Hilsz of France set a new women's flight altitude record of 14,000m.

== June 24, 1936 (Wednesday) ==
- Joe DiMaggio of the New York Yankees hit two home runs in the same inning (the 5th) during an 18–11 win over the Chicago White Sox at Comiskey Park.
- Born: Robert Downey, Sr., actor and filmmaker, in New York City (d. 2021)

== June 25, 1936 (Thursday) ==
- At the Montreux Convention, the Soviet Union demanded the right to unrestricted passage through the Dardanelles for its warships.
- The Focke-Wulf Fw 61 helicopter had its first flight.
- The American Airlines Douglas DC-3 had its first commercial flight.
- Born: B. J. Habibie, 3rd President of Indonesia, in Parepare (d. 2019)

== June 26, 1936 (Friday) ==
- Haile Selassie arrived in Geneva to make a speech before the League of Nations. During a press conference with journalists, Selassie maintained that his government remained the only legitimate authority of Ethiopia.
- The musical drama film San Francisco starring Clark Gable, Jeanette MacDonald and Spencer Tracy was released.
- Born: Hal Greer, basketball player, in Huntington, West Virginia (d. 2018); Jean-Claude Turcotte, Roman Catholic cardinal, in Montreal, Quebec, Canada (d. 2015)

== June 27, 1936 (Saturday) ==
- Franklin D. Roosevelt was unanimously renominated for President at the Democratic National Convention. John N. Garner was renominated that same day for Vice President.
- President Roosevelt gave an open-air address to 110,000 people at Franklin Field and millions more by radio, accepting the renomination.
- Prince De Wang was installed as the puppet ruler of Japanese-controlled Inner Mongolia.
- Born: Joe Doyle, politician, in Ireland (d. 2009)
- Died: Antonio Locatelli, 41, Italian pilot (killed in ambush in Ethiopia)

== June 28, 1936 (Sunday) ==
- The fascist French Popular Party was founded.
- Briskeby Arena opened in Hamar, Norway.
- Born: Chuck Howley, NFL linebacker, in Wheeling, West Virginia
- Died: Alexander Berkman, 65, Lithuanian anarchist (suicide)

== June 29, 1936 (Monday) ==
- Pope Pius XI promulgated the papal encyclical Vigilanti cura on the subject of motion pictures. "Since ... the cinema is in reality a sort of object lesson which, for good or for evil, teaches the majority of men more effectively than abstract reasoning, it must be elevated to conformity with the aims of a Christian conscience and saved from depraving and demoralizing effects", the pontiff wrote.
- The Merchant Marine Act was enacted, creating the United States Maritime Commission.
- Born: Harmon Killebrew, baseball player, in Payette, Idaho (d. 2011)
- Died: János Szlepecz, 64, Slovene Roman Catholic priest

== June 30, 1936 (Tuesday) ==
- Haile Selassie appeared before the League of Nations to give a speech. Italian correspondents in the press gallery created a loud disturbance and had to be removed by police before he could speak. Selassie then made an impassioned speech recounting the principal events of the war and criticizing the League for its ineffective response.
- The Copeland Committee released a scathing report on the United States' lack of funding and maintenance of navigational aids.
- The novel Gone with the Wind by Margaret Mitchell was published in the United States.
