= November 1935 =

Month of 1935

| << | November 1935 | | | | | >> |
| Su | Mo | Tu | We | Th | Fr | Sa |
| | | | | | 1 | 2 |
| 3 | 4 | 5 | 6 | 7 | 8 | 9 |
| 10 | 11 | 12 | 13 | 14 | 15 | 16 |
| 17 | 18 | 19 | 20 | 21 | 22 | 23 |
| 24 | 25 | 26 | 27 | 28 | 29 | 30 |

The following events occurred in November 1935:

== November 1, 1935 (Friday) ==
- Chinese Premier Wang Jingwei and three other officials were shot in an assassination attempt in Nanjing as they were gathering for a group photo. The assailant was killed but it was not clear if he committed suicide or was shot by government bodyguards returning fire.
- The Timiskaming earthquake occurred in western Quebec, Canada.
- Born: Edward Said, literary critic, in Jerusalem, Mandatory Palestine (d. 2003)

== November 2, 1935 (Saturday) ==
- Czechoslovak police arrested 28 people accused of spying for Germany.
- The German cruiser Nürnberg was commissioned in Kiel in the presence of Julius Streicher.
- John Buchan became Governor General of Canada.
- Died: Jock Cameron, 30, South African cricketer (typhoid fever)

== November 3, 1935 (Sunday) ==
- A Greek monarchy referendum was held by self-proclaimed Regent Georgios Kondylis. Almost 98% of the votes favored the return of the monarchy, although the referendum's integrity was highly dubious.
- The Socialist Republican Union was formed in France.

== November 4, 1935 (Monday) ==
- The Yankee hurricane made landfall near Miami, causing 4 known deaths.
- Poland and Germany signed an economic agreement.

== November 5, 1935 (Tuesday) ==
- The Italian offensive in northern Abyssinia was halted for two days because of heavy rains.
- 20 people went on trial in Paris over the Stavisky Affair.
- Born: Nicholas Maw, composer, in Grantham, England (d. 2009)

== November 6, 1935 (Wednesday) ==
- Adolf Hitler gave International Olympic Committee President Henri de Baillet-Latour his personal assurance that there would be no racial discrimination against athletes or visitors at next summer's Berlin Olympics.
- The prototype of the British Hawker Hurricane fighter plane had its first test flight.
- Died: Billy Sunday, 72, American baseball player and evangelist

== November 7, 1935 (Thursday) ==
- Germany introduced a new Reichskriegsflagge (Reich war flag). It resembled the national swastika flag, with elements of the old Imperial war flag included.
- The Union Nationale was founded in Quebec, Canada.
- Born: WS Rendra, Indonesian poet, actor, director, activist, performer, and dramatist (d. 2009)

== November 8, 1935 (Friday) ==
- Mek'ele fell to the Italians.
- The last remnants of Der Stahlhelm were finally dissolved on order of Hitler. In a letter to Franz Seldte, Hitler explained that re-introduction of conscription meant the organization was no longer necessary.
- British police arrested Hermann Görtz and charged him with spying for Germany.
- The drama film Mutiny on the Bounty was released.
- Born: Alain Delon, French-Swiss actor and businessman, in Sceaux, Hauts-de-Seine, France (d. 2024)
- Died: Charles Kingsford Smith, 38, when his plane crashed into the sea off Myanmar (Burma)

== November 9, 1935 (Saturday) ==
- The 15 Nazis and one bystander who died in the 1923 Beer Hall Putsch were re-interred in the newly constructed Ehrentempel (honour temples) commemorating the failed coup attempt.
- The Congress of Industrial Organizations (CIO), originally called the Committee for Industrial Organization, was created as a committee within the American Federation of Labor (AFL) by United Mine Workers (UMW) leader John L. Lewis.
- The Croatian Ice Hockey Federation was established.
- Arranmore disaster: 19 of the 20 passengers on board died when the boat they were travelling in crashed into rocks. The boat was transporting workers to Arranmore from Burtonport.
- Born: Bob Gibson, baseball player, in Omaha, Nebraska (d. 2020)

== November 10, 1935 (Sunday) ==
- The original Pančevo Bridge opened in Yugoslavia in the presence of Regent Prince Paul.
- Born: Igor Dmitriyevich Novikov, theoretical astrophysicist and cosmologist, in Moscow, USSR
- Died: Edward Shortt, 73, British lawyer and politician

== November 11, 1935 (Monday) ==
- The American balloon Explorer II was launched, reaching an altitude of 72,395 feet (22,066 m) with Captains Orvil A. Anderson and Albert William Stevens aboard. During the flight, Stevens took the first photograph to show the Earth's curvature.

== November 12, 1935 (Tuesday) ==
- The Ethiopian government reported a victory over Italian forces in Ogaden.
- In an effort to address nationwide supply shortages, Nazi Germany prohibited the export of important food and industrial raw materials.
- Nadir of American race relations: A 700-person lynch mob in Columbus, Texas hanged two African-American youths accused of raping and murdering a young white woman. The county attorney said he did not consider the citizens who committed the lynching a mob, and called their act "the expression of the will of the people."
- Born: William Tallon, servant of the British Royal Family, in Birtley, England (d. 2007)

== November 13, 1935 (Wednesday) ==
- There were anti-British riots in Cairo and various other places in Egypt .
- Chinese former warlord Sun Chuanfang was assassinated by Shi Jianqiao, daughter of a slain military officer, in a revenge killing.
- Born: George Carey, Anglican bishop, in London, England
- Died: Frank Navin, 64, principal owner of the Detroit Tigers; Sun Chuanfang, 49 or 50, Chinese warlord (assassinated)

== November 14, 1935 (Thursday) ==
- The United Kingdom general election was held. The National Government led by Stanley Baldwin won another majority.
- Ramsay MacDonald lost the Seaham constituency to Emanuel Shinwell.
- The Congress of Industrial Organizations was created in USA and Canada.
- Born: King Hussein of Jordan, in Amman, Emirate of Transjordan (d. 1999)

== November 15, 1935 (Friday) ==
- The Commonwealth of the Philippines was established when the new constitution went into effect.
- The United States and Canada signed a reciprocal trade agreement.
- The comedy film A Night at the Opera starring the Marx Brothers was released.
- Born: Mahmoud Abbas, 2nd President of the State of Palestine since 2005
- Born: Try Sutrisno, 6th Vice President of Indonesia from 1993 to 1998 (d. 2026)

== November 16, 1935 (Saturday) ==
- The German government protested to Britain that a new British regulation on German exports going into effect on November 18 was "not in harmony with certain provisions of the German-British trade agreement." The regulation stated that the exports must be accompanied by certificates of origin and was an attempt to prevent Italian exports from entering Britain.
- The musical Jumbo with music and lyrics by Richard Rodgers and Lorenz Hart premiered at the New York Hippodrome on Broadway.

== November 17, 1935 (Sunday) ==
- Pietro Badoglio replaced Emilio De Bono as commander of Italian forces in East Africa.
- Born: Toni Sailer, alpine ski racer, in Kitzbühel, Austria (d. 2009)

== November 18, 1935 (Monday) ==
- The League of Nations sanctions against Italy went into effect.
- The Freedom Monument was unveiled in Riga, Latvia.
- The U.S. Supreme Court decided Pacific States Box & Basket Co. v. White.
- Died: Evelyn Ruggles-Brise, 77, British penologist and founder of the Borstal system

== November 19, 1935 (Tuesday) ==
- The University of Budapest closed for a day due to anti-Semitic rioting.

== November 20, 1935 (Wednesday) ==
- Mussolini declared government control of all the gold in Italy. All sellers of gold would be required to declare their holdings and record every transaction, and gold could not be sold without first offering it to the government at a 5 percent interest rate.
- Died: John Jellicoe, 1st Earl Jellicoe, 75, British admiral

== November 21, 1935 (Thursday) ==
- Mussolini granted three months' leave to 100,000 troops and sent them to work in agriculture and industry to combat the effects of sanctions.
- The Jean Giraudoux play The Trojan War Will Not Take Place premiered at the Théâtre de l'Athénée in Paris.

== November 22, 1935 (Friday) ==
- Pan American Airways' China Clipper inaugurated transpacific airmail service by taking off from Alameda, California en route to Manila.
- A decree by Reich Economics Minister Hjalmar Schacht took effect that excluded Jews from membership in Germany's eight stock exchanges.
- About 100 people were killed in a storm around Catanzaro, Italy, mostly by landslides.
- The drama film Splendor starring Miriam Hopkins and Joel McCrea was released.
- Died: Noel Skelton, 55, Scottish politician and journalist

== November 23, 1935 (Saturday) ==
- Georgi Kyoseivanov became the 27th Prime Minister of Bulgaria.
- The China Clipper landed in Honolulu.
- Born: Jean Havlish, baseball player, in Saint Paul, Minnesota (d. 2025); Vladislav Volkov, cosmonaut, in Moscow, USSR (d. 1971 on Soyuz 11)

== November 24, 1935 (Sunday) ==
- The Piazza di Spagna in Rome was renamed the Piazza De Bono because of Spain's participation in sanctions against Italy.
- Born: Salim Khan, actor and screenwriter, in Indore, Central India Agency

== November 25, 1935 (Monday) ==
- Japan proclaimed the puppet state of East Hebei Autonomous Council in northern China.
- After 11 years in exile, the newly divorced George II returned to Greek soil as King of the Hellenes at Corfu from London.
- Brazil declared a state of siege to fight a leftist uprising in the country's north.
- The Mayor of Berlin Heinrich Sahm was expelled from the Nazi Party because his family was said to have bought from Jewish shops.
- German Olympic officials said that fencer Helene Mayer, despite being half-Jewish, would be allowed to compete for Germany in the 1936 Summer Olympics.
- Nazi Germany forbade Jewish artists from working under pseudonyms.
- Died: Iyasu V, 40, emperor-designate of Ethiopia

== November 26, 1935 (Tuesday) ==
- Polish miners and steel workers began a three-day strike for shorter hours, higher wages and better working conditions.
- The China Clipper landed at Wake Island.
- The film Scrooge, the first feature-length sound version of the Charles Dickens classic A Christmas Carol, premiered in Britain.

== November 27, 1935 (Wednesday) ==
- The China Clipper arrived in Guam.
- The New Zealand general election concluded. The Labour Party led by Michael Joseph Savage won its first electoral victory in party history.
- The uprising in Brazil was crushed.
- The romantic comedy film I Dream Too Much starring Henry Fonda, Lily Pons and Lucille Ball was released.
- Born: Pat Fordice, First Lady of Mississippi (d. 2007)

== November 28, 1935 (Thursday) ==
- The Italian Ministry of Propaganda announced a ban on performances of music by any countries who had voted in the League of Nations for the sanctions against Italy.
- Hitler declared all German males between 18 and 45 to be army reservists.
- Died: Erich von Hornbostel, 58, Austrian ethnomusicologist

== November 29, 1935 (Friday) ==
- The China Clipper completed its 8,000-mile (13,000 km) flight, landing in Manila.
- 60 people drowned when two ferries capsized in the Chinese province of Jiangsu.
- At the urging of King George II, Greece announced an amnesty for those involved in the March coup d'état attempt.
- Born: Diane Ladd, actress and director, in Meridian, Mississippi (d. 2025); Thomas J. O'Brien, Roman Catholic bishop, in Indianapolis, Indiana (d. 2018)

== November 30, 1935 (Saturday) ==
- To mark the 17th anniversary of the founding of Yugoslavia, King Peter II declared an amnesty for 1,200 political prisoners.
- Army defeated Navy 28-6 at the Army–Navy Game (American Football) at Franklin Field in Philadelphia.
- Born: Woody Allen, filmmaker, writer and comedian, in the Bronx, New York
