= February 1936 =

Month of 1936

<<	February 1936					>>
Su	Mo	Tu	We	Th	Fr	Sa
						1
2	3	4	5	6	7	8
9	10	11	12	13	14	15
16	17	18	19	20	21	22
23	24	25	26	27	28	29

The following events occurred in February 1936:

== February 1, 1936 (Saturday) ==
- An appeal from Benito Mussolini to "the students of Europe" was published in Il Popolo d'Italia, claiming that Italy wanted peace in Europe but sanctions against the country would lead to a war for which Italy would not be responsible.
- Died: Georgios Kondylis, 57, Greek general and two-time prime minister of Greece

== February 2, 1936 (Sunday) ==
- Fuji-Hakone-Izu National Park was established in Japan.

== February 3, 1936 (Monday) ==
- The Soviet Union issued a statement accusing troops from Japan and Manchukuo of making "provocatory raids" into Soviet territory.
- The first round of the Liechtenstein general election was held. The ruling Progressive Citizens' Party led by prime minister Josef Hoop won seven of the ten municipal seats in the Landtag of Liechtenstein, compared to the newly-formed opposition Patriotic Union winning three. The second round for the national vote was to be held on 16 February.
- Born: Jim Marshall, photographer, in Chicago, Illinois (d. 2010)
- Died: Charles E. Cox, 75, American lawyer and judge; Princess Sophie of Schönburg-Waldenburg, 50, consort of William, Prince of Wied

== February 4, 1936 (Tuesday) ==
- Idaho Senator William E. Borah formally announced his candidacy for President of the United States.
- The General Theory of Employment, Interest and Money by the English economist John Maynard Keynes was published.
- Born: David Brenner, comedian and actor, in Philadelphia, Pennsylvania (d. 2014); Gary Conway, actor and screenwriter, in Boston, Massachusetts
- Died: Wilhelm Gustloff, 41, leader of the Swiss NSDAP/AO was assassinated by David Frankfurter, a Croatian Jew.

== February 5, 1936 (Wednesday) ==
- The University of Birmingham student newspaper Redbrick was first published, as Guild News.
- The Charlie Chaplin silent comedy film Modern Times premiered at the Rivoli Theatre on Broadway. Police were on hand to push back the thousands of moviegoers who turned out to get a glimpse of the gala premiere.
- The Japan Occupational Baseball League was established.

== February 6, 1936 (Thursday) ==
- The IV Olympic Winter Games opened in Garmisch-Partenkirchen, Germany. As each delegation of the 28 participating countries marched past Adolf Hitler in the opening ceremony he gave the Nazi salute. Most athletes appeared to return the gesture, although the Nazi salute was confusingly similar to the traditional Olympic salute. The Americans were among those who did not salute.
- The Maxwell Anderson play The Masque of Kings premiered at the Shubert Theatre in New York City.
- Born: Kent Douglas, ice hockey player and coach, in Cobalt, Ontario, Canada (d. 2009)

== February 7, 1936 (Friday) ==
- The last inmates in Welfare Island, widely considered the worst prison in the United States, were transferred to Rikers Island so the old prison could be razed and replaced with a park and hospital.

== February 8, 1936 (Saturday) ==
- Jawaharlal Nehru was elected president of the Indian National Congress.
- The original Teatro Regio in Turin was destroyed by fire.
- The first-ever NFL draft was held. Jay Berwanger was the first pick, selected by the Philadelphia Eagles. However, he would never play in the NFL.
- Born: Larry Verne, novelty song singer, in Minneapolis, Minnesota (d. 2013)
- Died: Charles Curtis, 76, 31st Vice President of the United States

== February 9, 1936 (Sunday) ==
- Egypt reduced the age of conscription from 19 to 18 years of age.
- Born: Stompin' Tom Connors, country and folk musician, in Saint John, New Brunswick, Canada (d. 2013); Clive Swift, actor and songwriter, in Liverpool, England (d. 2019)
- Died: Jacques Bainville, 57, French historian and journalist

== February 10, 1936 (Monday) ==
- The Battle of Amba Aradam began on the northern front in Ethiopia.
- The U.S. Supreme Court decided Grosjean v. American Press Co..
- Ricoh, Japan based office machine and digital camera brand, founded in Tokyo.
- Rose McConnell Long, widow of Huey Long, was sworn in as a U.S. Senator to serve the remainder of her late husband's term.

== February 11, 1936 (Tuesday) ==
- French police fought 200 pro-Italian students at the University of Paris calling for the dismissal of Gaston Jèze, who served as legal counsel to Ethiopia.
- Dame Laura Knight became the first woman appointed to the Royal Academy.
- Great Britain pulled off a major upset in the Olympic ice hockey semifinal with a 2–1 victory over Canada.
- Born: Burt Reynolds, actor, in Lansing, Michigan (d. 2018)

== February 12, 1936 (Wednesday) ==
- A severe cold wave swept across North America, breaking numerous records and crippling transportation services.
- A committee of experts reported to the League of Nations that an oil embargo against Italy would take three and a half months to become effective, and even that would only be if the United States agreed to curtail its booming oil business with Italy.
- A short-circuit started a fire in a Manhattan café that killed 5 people and injured 37. The incident would have been minor were it not for the panic causing a crowded dash down the stairways.

== February 13, 1936 (Thursday) ==
- Charles Maurras published a column in Action Française calling for "the knife" to be used against politicians who supported sanctions against Italy. That same day, French politician Léon Blum was attacked and cut about the head by student followers of Maurras. That night, the French government banned the Action Française, Camelots du Roi and Royalist Students' Association under the law passed in December prohibiting extremist political leagues.

== February 14, 1936 (Friday) ==
- At least 5 were killed in Caracas, Venezuela during protests against a government decree establishing censorship of the press.
- Karl Schäfer of Austria won gold in men's figure skating at the Winter Olympics.
- Born: Andrew Prine, actor, in Jennings, Florida (d. 2022)

== February 15, 1936 (Saturday) ==
- Rabbis in Poland threatened to organize a strike of the meat industry if the government went through with its plan to abolish the kosher slaughter of animals.
- Great Britain won gold in the Olympic ice hockey tournament by playing the United States to a scoreless tie to finish atop the standings.
- Sonja Henie of Norway won gold in ladies' figure skating in the Winter Olympics.
- Died: Jack McGurn, 33, Italian-American mobster (assassinated)

== February 16, 1936 (Sunday) ==
- Legislative elections were held in Spain. A left-wing coalition known as the Popular Front defeated its main opponent, the Spanish Confederation of Autonomous Right-wing Groups.
- The second round of the Liechtenstein general election was held. The ruling Progressive Citizens' Party led by prime minister Josef Hoop won four of the five of the seats in the national vote, compared to the newly-formed opposition Patriotic Union winning one. The Progressive Citizens' Party secured a final majority of eleven of the fifteen seats in the Landtag of Liechtenstein.
- The Winter Olympics ended in Germany. Norway dominated the medal count with 7 gold medals and 15 medals in total.

== February 17, 1936 (Monday) ==
- Paraguayan President Eusebio Ayala was overthrown in a coup led by supporters of Rafael Franco.
- In Geneva, the League of Nations moved to its new headquarters, the Palace of Nations.
- After several years of a trade war, the British and Irish government signed a pact reducing tariffs between the two countries.
- The U.S. Supreme Court decided Ashwander v. Tennessee Valley Authority and Brown v. Mississippi.
- The comic strip The Phantom made its first appearance. Although the Phantom character did not have any superpowers, he was the first to wear a skintight unitard-style costume, the hallmark of many comic book superheroes to come.
- Born: Jim Brown, American football player and actor, in St. Simons, Georgia (d. 2023)
- Died: Alexander Pantages, 68 or 69, Greek-born American impresario

== February 18, 1936 (Tuesday) ==
- Switzerland banned the NSDAP/AO.
- Born: Dick Duff, ice hockey player, in Kirkland Lake, Ontario, Canada

== February 19, 1936 (Wednesday) ==
- The Battle of Amba Aradam ended in an Italian victory.
- The Spanish Republic announced an amnesty for the rebels in the 1934 Asturian revolt.
- Born: Sam Myers, blues musician, in Laurel, Mississippi (d. 2006)
- Died: Billy Mitchell, 56, U.S. Army general

== February 20, 1936 (Thursday) ==
- Police in Spain fired on crowds of leftists attempting to burn churches and convents. 8 deaths were reported around the country.
- The science fiction film Things to Come, written by H. G. Wells, premiered in Britain.
- The musical comedy film Follow the Fleet starring Fred Astaire and Ginger Rogers with music by Irving Berlin was released.
- Born: Larry Hovis, singer and actor, in Wapato, Washington (d. 2003); Shigeo Nagashima, baseball player and manager, in Sakura, Chiba, Japan
- Died: Kip Rhinelander, 32, American socialite (lobar pneumonia)

== February 21, 1936 (Friday) ==
- The new Spanish government freed 34,000 political prisoners.

== February 22, 1936 (Saturday) ==
- On George Washington's 204th birthday, retired baseball legend Walter Johnson replicated a feat attributed to Washington by throwing a silver dollar across the Rappahannock River. Though it remained in dispute whether Washington ever did such a thing, Johnson did prove that it could be done.
- Nazi Germany established quotas for Jewish doctors. The decree by Gerhard Wagner stated that the proportion of Jewish doctors in Germany could not exceed the proportion of Jews in the country's general population.
- Born: Elizabeth MacRae, actress, in Columbia, North Carolina (d. 2024)

== February 23, 1936 (Sunday) ==
- Puerto Rico's Chief of Police E. Francis Riggs was shot and killed by two young Nationalists. The two assailants were captured and executed immediately without trial.

== February 24, 1936 (Monday) ==
- Anthony Eden addressed the House of Commons for the first time as Foreign Secretary. He responded to criticism of the League of Nations failing to impose oil sanctions on Italy by explaining that oil was "a sanction like any other and must be judged by the same criterion, whether its imposition will help stop the war."
- Born: Lance Reventlow, entrepreneur and racing driver, in London, England (d. 1972)
- Died: Albert Ritchie, 59, American lawyer and politician

== February 25, 1936 (Tuesday) ==
- Artists from Tin Pan Alley such as Rudy Vallée, George Gershwin and Irving Berlin came to Washington to fight a bill affecting the copyrighting of popular songs.

== February 26, 1936 (Wednesday) ==
- The attempted coup known as the February 26 Incident began in Japan.
- In Saxony, Hitler opened the first Volkswagen production plant.
- Died: Takahashi Korekiyo, 81, 20th prime minister of Japan (assassinated); Saitō Makoto, 77, Japanese admiral and politician (assassinated); Antonio Scotti, 70, Italian baritone; Jōtarō Watanabe, 61, Japanese general (assassinated)

== February 27, 1936 (Thursday) ==
- The Second Battle of Tembien began on Ethiopia's northern front.
- The French Chamber of Deputies ratified the Franco-Soviet Treaty of Mutual Assistance, 353 to 164.
- Born: Roger Mahony, Archbishop of Los Angeles, in Hollywood, California
- Died: Ivan Pavlov, 86, Russian physiologist and Nobel laureate; Mulugeta Yeggazu, Ethiopian government official and military leader

== February 28, 1936 (Friday) ==
- The Interstate Commerce Commission ordered a reduction in basic rail passenger fares from 3.6 to 2 cents per mile everywhere in the United States.
- Died: Charles Nicolle, 69, French bacteriologist and Nobel laureate

== February 29, 1936 (Saturday) ==
- The Second Battle of Tembien ended in an Italian victory.
- The Japanese coup attempt was put down.
- President Roosevelt extended the 1935 Neutrality Act through May 1, 1937.
- Born: Henri Richard, ice hockey player, in Montreal, Quebec, Canada (d. 2020); Alex Rocco, actor, in Cambridge, Massachusetts (d. 2015)
- Died: Shirō Nonaka, 32, central conspirator in the February 26 Incident (suicide)
