= December 1935 =

Month of 1935

<<	December 1935					>>
Su	Mo	Tu	We	Th	Fr	Sa
1	2	3	4	5	6	7
8	9	10	11	12	13	14
15	16	17	18	19	20	21
22	23	24	25	26	27	28
29	30	31

The following events occurred in December 1935:

== December 1, 1935 (Sunday) ==
- Reichsminister of Church Affairs Hanns Kerrl decreed that all pastors must submit pastoral letters to the government for approval.

== December 2, 1935 (Monday) ==
- The British cabinet decided to support a motion at the League of Nations that sanctions against Italy be expanded to include an oil embargo.
- French Fascist Marcel Bucard and 110 supporters were arrested in Strasbourg.
- Died: James Henry Breasted, 70, American archaeologist and historian

== December 3, 1935 (Tuesday) ==
- In his speech from the throne opening the new session of British Parliament, King George V said it was "urgently necessary" for Britain's air defenses to be improved.
- Died: Princess Victoria of the United Kingdom, 67

== December 4, 1935 (Wednesday) ==
- Nazi Germany placed an embargo on its own currency effective December 6. Foreign tourists were limited to bringing no more than 30 marks' worth of bank notes into the country at a time.
- Italian children had a three-hour school day (10 a.m. to 1 p.m.) in order to save coal.
- Died: Johan Halvorsen, 71, Norwegian composer, conductor and violinist; Charles Richet, 85, French physiologist and Nobel laureate

== December 5, 1935 (Thursday) ==
- After nearly four years of study, the Church of England decided not to allow women to be admitted to the priesthood.
- Court in Prague sentenced Otto Strasser to five months in prison for illegal use of a secret radio transmitter.
- The U.S. Supreme Court decided United States v. Constantine.
- The musical May Wine premiered at the St. James Theatre on Broadway.
- Born:
  - Calvin Trillin, writer, in Kansas City, Missouri
  - Yuri Vlasov, Soviet and Russian heavyweight weightlifter, writer and politician, in Makeyvka, Ukrainian SSR (d. 2021)

== December 6, 1935 (Friday) ==
- Italian planes bombed Emperor Haile Selassie's headquarters at Dessie. The American Seventh-day Adventist Hospital and a Red Cross tent were also hit by the indiscriminately dropped bombs, though the hospital was evacuated minutes before the attack. The emperor sent a vigorously worded protest to the League of Nations over the incident.
- Michael Joseph Savage became 23rd Prime Minister of New Zealand.

== December 7, 1935 (Saturday) ==
- Dessie was heavily bombarded again. International Red Cross representatives sent a formal protest of the bombings to the League of Nations.
- Mussolini defiantly told his parliament that sanctions would not deter Italy from its path and that only "full recognition of our rights and the safeguarding of our East African interests" could solve the crisis.
- British Foreign Secretary Samuel Hoare arrived in Paris for talks with French Prime Minister Pierre Laval on the Italo-Abyssinian conflict.
- Japan publicly demanded absolute naval parity with the United States and Great Britain.
- The Winnipeg 'Pegs beat the Hamilton Tigers 18-12 to win the 23rd Grey Cup of Canadian football.

== December 8, 1935 (Sunday) ==
- The Anglo-French proposal known as the Hoare–Laval Pact was agreed upon, in which Abyssinia would be partitioned and much of its territory given to Italy. The two delegations informed the media that they had come up with a plan, but withheld the details so the interested governments could review them.
- Houston, Texas was ravaged by flooding, causing hundreds to flee their homes.
- Born: Dharmendra, film actor, in Nasrali, Khanna, Punjab, British India

== December 9, 1935 (Monday) ==
- The French newspapers L'Œuvre and L'Écho de Paris leaked details of the Hoare–Laval Pact.
- The six major naval powers (Britain, France, Germany, Italy, Japan and the United States) opened a conference in London trying one last time to reduce naval armaments.
- Over a thousand students gathered at Tiananmen Square to protest against Chiang Kai-shek's failure to fight back against Japanese aggression. The demonstration was dispersed by police.
- The Downtown Athletic Club Trophy was awarded for the first time, to Jay Berwanger of the University of Chicago. The following year after the death of John Heisman the name of the award would be changed to the Heisman Trophy.
- The U.S. Supreme Court decided Fox Film Corp. v. Muller.
- Died: Walter Liggett, 49, American journalist (murdered)

== December 10, 1935 (Tuesday) ==
- The British newspaper The Times published its own report of leaked details of the Hoare–Laval Pact. As public anger about the proposal grew, Prime Minister Stanley Baldwin responded to a question in the House of Commons by saying it would be "premature to make a statement on the subject at present" because he was not sure if the proposal had been finalized.
- The 1935 Nobel Prizes were awarded in Stockholm. The recipients were James Chadwick of the United Kingdom for Physics, Frédéric and Irène Joliot-Curie of France (Chemistry) and Hans Spemann of Germany (Physiology or Medicine). No Literature Prize was awarded and the Peace Prize was not awarded at the time either – Carl von Ossietzky was retroactively named the recipient one year later.
- Nazi Germany published the details of a new decree requiring a "certificate of fitness for marriage" before Germans were allowed to wed. Prospective spouses were required to fill out a six-page questionnaire about their health, parentage, childhood rates of development and present smoking, drinking and sexual habits. Doctors were instructed to evaluate the fitness of each candidate and could deny a certificate if not satisfied.
- Died: Sir John Carden, 6th Baronet, 43, English tank and vehicle designer (plane crash)

== December 11, 1935 (Wednesday) ==
- Referring to the leaked details of the Hoare–Laval Pact, Ethiopia announced that it strongly rejected any proposal that would "reward Italian aggression."
- Albert Meyer was elected President of the Swiss Confederation for 1936.
- Born: Ron Carey, film and television actor, in Newark, New Jersey (d. 2007); Pranab Mukherjee, 13th President of India, in Mirati, British India (d. 2020)

== December 12, 1935 (Thursday) ==
- Edward Russell, 26th Baron de Clifford was found not guilty of manslaughter in a case of careless driving. This was the last time a trial of peers in the House of Lords was held, since that privilege of peerage was abolished in 1948.
- King Fuad restored the Egyptian Constitution of 1923.
- The Lebensborn organization was established in Nazi Germany.

== December 13, 1935 (Friday) ==
- The full text of the Hoare–Laval Pact was revealed to the public, causing a huge split at the League of Nations. Haile Selassie told the League that the plan violated the spirit of the League Covenant.
- Italy sent a protest to the League accusing Ethiopia of abusing the Red Cross emblem by placing it in militarized areas.
- Police in Nazi Germany closed Barasch Brothers' Department Store, a prominent Jewish establishment, for an "indefinite period". Police claimed that executives were forcing its female employees into illicit relations.
- The execution date for Richard Hauptmann was set for January 13 after the Supreme Court declined to review his trial.
- Representatives of the federal and provincial governments of Canada agreed unanimously to amend the constitution to allow the country to make its own constitutional amendments without recourse to the British Parliament.
- Born: Kenneth Hall, American football player, in Madisonville, Texas (d. 2025); Lindy McDaniel, baseball player, in Hollis, Oklahoma (d. 2020)
- Died: Victor Grignard, 64, French chemist and Nobel laureate

== December 14, 1935 (Saturday) ==
- Ted Drake of Arsenal scored seven goals in one game against Aston Villa.
- Tomáš Garrigue Masaryk resigned as President of Czechoslovakia due to old age.
- In New York City, a fundraising rally was held in Madison Square Garden for the Italian Red Cross. The crowd cheered every mention of Mussolini's name and booed references to Britain and sanctions. Mayor Fiorello H. La Guardia spoke at the event but kept his comments politically neutral.
- Born: Lee Remick, film and television actress, in Quincy, Massachusetts (d. 1991); Anthony Wilden, writer and social theorist, in London, England (d. 2019)
- Died: Stanley G. Weinbaum, 33, American science fiction writer (lung cancer)

== December 15, 1935 (Sunday) ==
- The Christmas Offensive began when Ethiopians launched a counterattack against the Italians at Dembeguina Pass.
- Rodolfo Graziani sent Mussolini a telegram requesting "maximum freedom of action for use of asphyxiating gases."
- In the NFL Championship Game, the Detroit Lions beat the New York Giants 26-7 at University of Detroit Stadium.

== December 16, 1935 (Monday) ==
- Haile Selassie held a conference for reporters on the porch of his headquarters to reject the Hoare–Laval Pact. Selassie declared that acceptance of the proposal "would not only be cowardice toward our people, but a betrayal of the League of Nations and of all states that have thought up to now that they could have confidence in the system of collective security."
- Mussolini authorized the use of chemical weapons in Ethiopia.
- Pope Pius XI created eighteen new cardinals.
- In Manhattan, the Frick Collection of art opened to the public.
- Died: Thelma Todd, 30, American actress (accidental carbon monoxide poisoning)

== December 17, 1935 (Tuesday) ==
- The prototype of the Douglas DC-3 airliner made its first flight.
- The British Boy Scouts announced that two of the organization's badges bearing the swastika would be redesigned to remove the symbol due to its increased association with Nazi Germany.
- Born: Cal Ripken, Sr., baseball coach and manager, in Aberdeen, Maryland (d. 1999)
- Died: Juan Vicente Gómez, 78, general and three-time President of Venezuela

== December 18, 1935 (Wednesday) ==
- Samuel Hoare resigned as British Foreign Secretary over the unpopular Hoare–Laval Pact.
- A magnitude 6.0 earthquake struck Sichuan Province in China that killed about 100 people and destroyed many homes.
- While inaugurating the new municipality of Pontinia, Mussolini introduced "Faith Day", in which Italians were to donate their wedding rings so the material could be melted down for use by the state. Queen Elena inaugurated the day in Rome by donating the King and Queen's own rings and receiving steel substitutes in return.
- Edvard Beneš became President of Czechoslovakia.
- The Lanka Sama Samaja Party was founded in Sri Lanka.

== December 19, 1935 (Thursday) ==
- Labour Party leader Clement Attlee brought a motion of censure against the government of Stanley Baldwin, explaining, "If it is right for (Samuel Hoare) to resign, then it is right for the Government to resign." Baldwin stood and took chief responsibility for the Hoare–Laval debacle, and declared that the proposals were "absolutely and completely dead" and that the government would "make no attempt to resurrect them." Attlee's motion was defeated, 397 to 165.
- Born: Tony Taylor, baseball player, in Central Álava, Cuba (d. 2020); Bobby Timmons, jazz pianist and composer, in Philadelphia, Pennsylvania (d. 1974)

== December 20, 1935 (Friday) ==
- British scientist Michael Perrin and his team at Imperial Chemical Industries were able to successfully reproduce a substance created by accident two years earlier. The new substance was named polyethylene.
- Idaho Republican Senator William Borah announced his willingness to run for president in 1936. "My primary objective is a convention of liberal delegates which will write a liberal platform and name a liberal candidate", Borah explained in a statement. "To that end I shall devote my efforts. If in any state or district the liberal forces think that it will help the liberal cause to pledge delegates to me, I shall cooperate fully with that plan."
- U.S. government employee Patrick W. Tierney fell to his death from the intake tower at Hoover Dam, becoming the last worker to die during the dam's construction. Tierney died 13 years to the day after his father, J.G. Tierney, fell off a barge into the Colorado River and drowned while conducting a geological survey preparatory to the dam's construction.
- Died: Martin O'Meara, 50, Irish-born Australian soldier

== December 21, 1935 (Saturday) ==
- Anthony Eden informed Prime Minister Baldwin that Turkey, Greece, Romania, Yugoslavia and Czechoslovakia would aid Britain in the event of war with Italy.
- Nazi Germany forced Jewish doctors to resign from private hospitals.
- Born: Phil Donahue, American talk show host, in Cleveland, Ohio (d. 2024)
- Died: Kurt Tucholsky, 45, German-Jewish journalist and writer (suicide)

== December 22, 1935 (Sunday) ==
- Anthony Eden was named Britain's new Secretary of State for Foreign Affairs.

== December 23, 1935 (Monday) ==
- The Italians first used chemical weapons in Ethiopia, spraying mustard gas and dropping bombs with mustard agent on Ethiopian soldiers and civilians.
- In a Christmas radio message, Austrian Chancellor Kurt Schuschnigg announced an extensive amnesty for political prisoners. It benefited both Socialists who fought in the Austrian Civil War and Nazis who participated in the July Putsch.
- It was announced that Charles Lindbergh and his family had departed the United States for England due to kidnapping threats against their 3-year-old son.
- Born: Paul Hornung, American football player, in Louisville, Kentucky (d. 2020)

== December 24, 1935 (Tuesday) ==
- The Soviet Union announced that its submarine and destroyer fleets had quadrupled in size over the last four years.
- 20 were killed and 80 injured in a train collision in Großheringen, Germany.
- Haile Selassie gave a Christmas message asking all Christian nations to pray for peace.

== December 25, 1935 (Wednesday) ==
- Vice Minister of Chinese Railways Tang Yu-jen was assassinated in Shanghai.
- Italian colonial authorities sentenced three Eritreans to be shot in the back as spies for Ethiopia.
- Born: Stephen Barnett, law professor and legal scholar, in Brooklyn, New York (d. 2009); Sadiq al-Mahdi, political and religious figure, in Al-Abasya, Omdurman, Sudan (d. 2020); Anne Roiphe, writer, journalist and feminist, in New York City; George Vande Woude, cancer researcher, in Brooklyn, New York (d. 2021)

== December 26, 1935 (Thursday) ==
- Martial law was declared in Shanghai, Nanjing and Hankou following Tang Yu-jen's assassination.
- Born: Gnassingbé Eyadéma, President of Togo, in Pya, Togo (d. 2005); Al Jackson, baseball player, in Waco, Texas (d. 2019); Norm Ullman, ice hockey player, in Provost, Alberta, Canada
- Died: Tito Minniti, 26, Italian pilot (killed after being captured by Ethiopians)

== December 27, 1935 (Friday) ==
- Five American warplanes of the 23d Bomb Squadron bombed Mauna Loa in Hawaii in an unprecedented attempt to divert the flow of lava from a volcanic eruption. The bombs hit their mark, but it was not clear if they had any effect.
- Uruguay broke off diplomatic relations with the Soviet Union. Uruguay accused the Soviets of using their legation as a headquarters for plotting communist revolutions.
- The film A Tale of Two Cities, based on the Charles Dickens novel of the same name, was released.

== December 28, 1935 (Saturday) ==
- The Sumatra earthquake occurred.
- Mussolini renounced the Stresa Front and Four-Power Pact due to hostile relations with Britain and France.
- The French government banned political "leagues" in an attempt to counteract radical political organizations.

== December 29, 1935 (Sunday) ==
- James Grover McDonald announced his resignation, effective tomorrow, as League of Nations High Commissioner for Refugees Coming from Germany. In his letter of resignation he explained that racial persecution in Germany had become so large a problem that only the League itself could solve it by addressing its source.
- The Soviet Union decided to allow Christmas trees again, but only for New Year's when they would be designated as New Year trees.
- Died: Photios II of Constantinople, 60 or 61, Ecumenical Patriarch of Constantinople

== December 30, 1935 (Monday) ==
- Dolo hospital airstrike: Italian warplanes bombed a Swedish Red Cross field hospital in southern Ethiopia, killing 42. The bombing, apparently in retaliation for the brutal murder, 4 days earlier, of a downed Italian pilot by Ethiopians, greatly angered Sweden and led to a diplomatic row with Italy.
- Ethiopia protested to the League of Nations that Italy had used chemical weapons in violation of the Geneva Convention.
- In order to economize gold, Nazi Germany restricted the size of wedding rings and the amount of gold that they could contain.
- The Leni Riefenstahl-directed documentary Tag der Freiheit: Unsere Wehrmacht (Day of Freedom: Our Armed Forces) premiered in Germany.
- My Day, a newspaper column by First Lady of the United States Eleanor Roosevelt, made its debut.
- Born: Omar Bongo, President of Gabon, in Lewai, French Equatorial Africa (d. 2009); Sandy Koufax, baseball player, in Brooklyn, New York
- Died: Rufus Isaacs, 1st Marquess of Reading, 75, English judge and politician; Hunter Liggett, 78, American army general

== December 31, 1935 (Tuesday) ==
- The Imperial Airways passenger plane City of Khartoum ran out of fuel and crashed off Alexandria, Egypt. 12 of the 13 aboard were killed.
- The Lindbergh family reached English shores and dodged an army of reporters, secluding themselves in a Liverpool hotel and turning down all requests for interviews.
- The musical film King of Burlesque had its world premiere at Grauman's Chinese Theatre in Hollywood.
- Born: King Salman of Saudi Arabia, in Riyadh, Saudi Arabia
