= May 1936 =

Month of 1936

<<	May 1936					>>
Su	Mo	Tu	We	Th	Fr	Sa
					1	2
3	4	5	6	7	8	9
10	11	12	13	14	15	16
17	18	19	20	21	22	23
24	25	26	27	28	29	30
31

The following events occurred in May 1936:

== May 1, 1936 (Friday) ==
- Emperor Haile Selassie, his wife Menen Asfaw and key members of the Ethiopian government decided to depart Addis Ababa by train and flee to Djibouti in French Somaliland.
- RAF Training Command was formed.
- Starting on this day, every newlywed couple in Nazi Germany was to receive a copy of Mein Kampf from the registrar.
- The Brazilian football club Associação Desportiva Confiança was founded.

== May 2, 1936 (Saturday) ==
- Parliamentary elections were held in Egypt, won by the Wafd Party.
- Bold Venture won the Kentucky Derby.
- The Sergei Prokofiev composition Peter and the Wolf premiered in Moscow.
- The Federal Bureau of Investigation arrested "Public Enemy No. 1" Alvin Karpis in New Orleans.
- Born: Sam DeLuca, AFL football player, in Brooklyn, New York (d. 2011); Engelbert Humperdinck, pop singer, in Madras, British India; Perdita Huston, journalist and women's rights activist, in Portland, Maine (d. 2001)

== May 3, 1936 (Sunday) ==
- The French legislative elections concluded. The Popular Front completed its victory and won a majority of seats in the Chamber of Deputies.
- Joe DiMaggio made his major league debut with the New York Yankees, going 3-for-6 with a triple during a 14–5 win over the St. Louis Browns.
- RC Paris beat FCO Charleville 1–0 in the Coupe de France Final.
- Died: Kikunae Ikeda, 71, Japanese chemist (b. 1864)

== May 4, 1936 (Monday) ==
- Haile Selassie and his entourage sailed aboard HMS Enterprise from Djibouti to Port Said.
- Rioters in Madrid set fire to Catholic churches, schools and monasteries due to unfounded rumors that priests and nuns were distributing poisoned candy to children.
- Died: Ludwig von Falkenhausen, 91, German general

== May 5, 1936 (Tuesday) ==
- The Italian army entered the Ethiopian capital of Addis Ababa. That evening, Mussolini gave a nationally broadcast speech declaring victory in the Second Italo-Ethiopian War.
- The short comic play Ways and Means by Noël Coward premiered in London.

== May 6, 1936 (Wednesday) ==
- The German airship Hindenburg departed on its first flight to the United States.
- Marshal Pietro Badoglio named Giuseppe Bottai as the first Italian Governor of Addis Ababa.

== May 7, 1936 (Thursday) ==
- Amy Johnson reclaimed her England-to-South Africa flight record when she landed her Percival Gull Six at Cape Town 3 days, 6 hours and 29 minutes after leaving Kent.
- At dawn in Washington, D.C., it was discovered that someone had hoisted the flag of the Soviet Union on the flagpole of the United States Supreme Court Building overnight, and had knotted the halyard so well that it could not be hauled down. At the base of the flagpole a copy of The Harvard Lampoon was found, indicating the work of a prankster. Police called in the fire department, who extended a ladder up to the flag and burned it.
- Born: Jimmy Ruffin, soul singer, in Collinsville, Mississippi (d. 2014)

== May 8, 1936 (Friday) ==
- Jockey Ralph Neves was thrown from his horse at Bay Meadows Racetrack in San Mateo, California and pronounced dead at the scene. His apparently dead body was taken away, but a doctor revived him with a shot of adrenaline. A famous headline in the next day's San Francisco Examiner read, "Neves, Called Dead in Fall, Denies It."
- Haile Selassie arrived in Palestine.
- German priest Paul Schulte celebrated the first aerial Catholic mass aboard the LZ 129 Hindenburg, with another ceremony for the crew taking place the following day.
- Died: Oswald Spengler, 55, German historian and philosopher

== May 9, 1936 (Saturday) ==
- Benito Mussolini announced the annexation of Ethiopia and proclaimed Italian East Africa in a triumphant speech from the balcony of the Palazzo Venezia. He declared a resurgent Roman empire and asked the assembled crowd, "Will you be worthy of it?" The crowd answered with a cry of "Si!"
- Police in Thessaloniki fired on a crowd staging a general strike against the government of Ioannis Metaxas. 30 were killed and hundreds wounded.
- The Hindenburg arrived at Lakehurst, New Jersey in a record time of 61 hours and 39 minutes.
- Born: Albert Finney, actor, in Charlestown, Pendleton, Greater Manchester, England (d. 2019); Glenda Jackson, politician and actress, in Birkenhead, England (d. 2023)

== May 10, 1936 (Sunday) ==
- Haile Selassie gave a written statement to journalists explaining that he and his family fled Ethiopia because their death or imprisonment would not have served the interests of the people. "Upon consulting our nobles, it was agreed that we could best serve the interests of our people by going abroad so that we might freely pursue our efforts to safeguard the independence of Ethiopia", the statement read.
- Manuel Azaña became the new President of Spain.
- Achille Varzi of Italy won the Tripoli Grand Prix.

== May 11, 1936 (Monday) ==
- The Italian delegation at the League of Nations walked out on a session about Ethiopia when the League allowed Ethiopia's delegate to continue participating in League sessions.
- The horror film Dracula's Daughter was released.

== May 12, 1936 (Tuesday) ==
- The Italian delegation to the League of Nations left Geneva at Mussolini's command.
- Born: Guillermo Endara, President of Panama, in Panama City (d. 2009); Tom Snyder, newscaster and talk show host, in Milwaukee, Wisconsin (d. 2007); Frank Stella, minimalist and abstract artist, in Malden, Massachusetts (d. 2024)

== May 13, 1936 (Wednesday) ==
- Santiago Casares Quiroga became Prime Minister of Spain.
- Austrian Vice-Chancellor Ernst Rüdiger Starhemberg sent Mussolini a telegram congratulating him on his conquest of Ethiopia. The Austrian foreign office was flooded with diplomatic protests from other countries that same day.
- The trial of Charles Lucky Luciano began, he was sentenced to 50 years.

== May 14, 1936 (Thursday) ==
- Ernst Rüdiger Starhemberg was dismissed as Vice-Chancellor of Austria. An official statement explained that it was due to "differences of opinion with Chancellor Schuschnigg."
- Guatemala notified the League of Nations that it was withdrawing from the organization.
- The musical drama film Show Boat starring Irene Dunne, Allan Jones and Charles Winninger premiered at Radio City Music Hall in New York.
- Born: Bobby Darin, singer and actor, in East Harlem, New York (d. 1973); Dick Howser, baseball player, coach and manager, in Miami, Florida (d. 1987)
- Died: Edmund Allenby, 1st Viscount Allenby, 75, English soldier and British Imperial Governor

== May 15, 1936 (Friday) ==
- Felicjan Sławoj Składkowski became Prime Minister of Poland.
- In a move aimed at the Heimwehr, Chancellor Schuschnigg ordered Austrian private armies to dissolve.
- Born: Wavy Gravy, entertainer and peace activist, in East Greenbush, New York; Paul Zindel, playwright and novelist, in Tottenville, Staten Island, New York (d. 2003)

== May 16, 1936 (Saturday) ==
- The Italian Senate ratified the annexation of Ethiopia.
- 3 Jews were killed and 2 injured in Jerusalem when an assailant opened fire on a crowd leaving a movie theatre.
- Bold Venture won the Preakness Stakes over Granville by a nose.
- Died: Leonidas Paraskevopoulos, 75, Greek military officer and politician

== May 17, 1936 (Sunday) ==
- A curfew was imposed in Jerusalem to prevent rioting due to the previous night's shooting.
- Born: Dennis Hopper, actor and filmmaker, in Dodge City, Kansas (d. 2010)

== May 18, 1936 (Monday) ==
- In Japan, Sada Abe strangled her lover with an obi and then cut off his genitals to carry around with her as a souvenir. When the crime was discovered the next day it became a national sensation and would be the subject of many books and movies over the decades to follow.
- Former U.S. President Herbert Hoover released a written statement asserting that he was not a candidate for president in 1936. "I have rigidly prevented my friends from setting up any organization and from presenting my name in any primary or to any state convention, and not a single delegate from California or any other state is pledged to me", Hoover declared. "That should end such discussion."
- The U.S. Supreme Court decided Carter v. Carter Coal Co. and Wallace v. Cutten.

== May 19, 1936 (Tuesday) ==
- The Republican Party presidential primaries concluded with Alf Landon defeating William Borah in New Jersey.
- The Mocidade Portuguesa paramilitary youth organization was created in Portugal.
- Louis Zamperini ran the fastest U.S. high school mile running 4:21. The record stood for 19 year

== May 20, 1936 (Wednesday) ==
- Miguel Mariano Gómez became President of Cuba.
- David Toro became President of Bolivia.
- The Rural Electrification Act was enacted in the United States.
- Died: Elmer Fowler Stone, 49, American naval aviator and Coast Guard commander

== May 21, 1936 (Thursday) ==
- During his annual message to Congress, Chilean President Arturo Alessandri hinted that Chile may withdraw from the League of Nations if it was not reorganized. "The great day of open diplomacy has not arrived", Alessandri said. "There has been no reduction of armaments. The political conveniences of the great powers have prevailed over the principles of the Covenant. The League's peace machinery is ineffective and 15 years of experience have shown that it requires fundamental revision." Alessandri mentioned unspecified "other measures" that would be taken if this revision did not happen.
- Born: Günter Blobel, biologist and Nobel laureate, in Waltersdorf, Lower Silesia, Germany (d. 2018)

== May 22, 1936 (Friday) ==
- James Henry Thomas resigned as Secretary of State for the Colonies after becoming embroiled in a political scandal involving leaked budget details.

== May 23, 1936 (Saturday) ==
- Australia raised its tariff rates, angering Japan as the move hurt Japanese textile imports.
- The Black Native Party was founded in Uruguay.
- Born: Ingeborg Hallstein, soprano, in Munich, Germany

== May 24, 1936 (Sunday) ==
- General elections were held in Belgium, won by the Belgian Labour Party. The new far-right Rexist Party finished fourth.
- Tony Lazzeri of the New York Yankees became the first player in major league baseball history to hit two grand slams in the same game during a 25-2 drubbing of the Philadelphia Athletics. He also recorded 11 runs batted in, an American League record that still stands.
- Died: Claudia Muzio, 47, Italian operatic soprano

== May 25, 1936 (Monday) ==
- In Wayne County, Michigan, 25 members of the Black Legion were charged with murder and kidnapping in connection with the death of a WPA worker the night of May 12–13.
- The Remington Rand strike began in the United States.
- The Socialist Party of America nominated Norman Thomas for President of the United States. It was his third nomination for the presidency.
- Born: Tom T. Hall, country musician and writer, in Olive Hill, Kentucky (d. 2021)

== May 26, 1936 (Tuesday) ==
- 276 Catholic monks went on trial in Koblenz, Germany on charges of immorality both among themselves and with young male pupils. The public was barred from the court proceedings.

== May 27, 1936 (Wednesday) ==
- The RMS Queen Mary departed Southampton on her maiden voyage to New York.
- Born: Louis Gossett Jr., actor, in Brooklyn, New York (d. 2024)
- Died: Duchess Elsa of Württemberg, 60

== May 28, 1936 (Thursday) ==
- A special edition of The London Gazette announced that the coronation date of Edward VIII had been set for May 12, 1937. Heralds made the official proclamation of the coronation date the following day.
- In a paper submitted to the London Mathematical Society, Alan Turing describes his Turing Machine.
- José Antonio Primo de Rivera was sentenced to five months in prison for arms trafficking.

== May 29, 1936 (Friday) ==
- The Turkish Flag Law standardized the appearance of the flag of Turkey.
- In Spain, during armed confrontation between Guardia Civil and local farmers, known as Events of Yeste, 18 people have been killed and many more heavily wounded
- The Brazilian Institute of Geography and Statistics was founded.
- Died:
  - Percy Dearmer, English Anglican priest and liturgist (b. 1867)
  - Norman Chaney, 21, American child actor (myocarditis)

== May 30, 1936 (Saturday) ==
- Germany observed a memorial day for the Navy to mark the 20th anniversary of the Battle of Jutland. Hitler attended the dedication of the Laboe Naval Memorial but was not among those who spoke at the ceremony.
- Louis Meyer won the Indianapolis 500, becoming the first driver to win the race three times.
- Born: Andy Tielman, Indorock artist, in Makassar, Dutch East Indies (d. 2011)
- Died: Homer Watson, 81, Canadian landscape painter

== May 31, 1936 (Sunday) ==
- Spanish politician Indalecio Prieto was shot during a socialist rally in Écija.
- Gustaaf Deloor of Belgium the Vuelta a España bicycle race for the second year running. The race was not held again until 1941 due to the Spanish Civil War.
- Fitzgerald Stadium opened in Killarney, Ireland.
