= Far Out Space Nuts =

1975–76 American children's television series

- Genre: Children's television series; Adventure; Comedy; Comic science fiction
- Created by: Sid and Marty Krofft; Joe Ruby; Ken Spears; Chuck McCann; Earle Doud
- Starring: Bob Denver; Chuck McCann; Patty Maloney
- Country of origin: United States
- No. of episodes: 15

Production
- Executive producer: Sid and Marty Krofft
- Producer: Al Schwartz
- Production locations: Samuel Goldwyn Studios; Compact Video Systems, Inc.
- Running time: 25 minutes (per episode)
- Production company: Sid & Marty Krofft Television Productions

Original release
- Network: CBS
- Release: September 6 – December 13, 1975

Far Out Space Nuts is an American children's television series that aired in 1975 for one season of 15 episodes. It was one of only two Krofft series produced exclusively for CBS (the second being 1984's Pryor's Place). Reruns of the show aired in daily syndication from 1978 to 1985 as part of the "Krofft Superstars" package with six other Krofft series.

== Plot ==
Like most of the Kroffts's productions, the show's opening sequence provides the setup of its fanciful premise: While loading food into various compartments to prepare a rocket for an upcoming mission, Barney instructs Junior to hit the "lunch" button, but Junior mistakenly hits the "launch" button. The rocket blasts off and takes them on various misadventures on alien planets.

Typically, in each episode, their spaceship (a NASA lunar module) would be captured by aliens (one being played by John Carradine, who so impressed Denver with his acting skills during a scene that he was left speechless and missed his cue, requiring another take) and taken to some strange planet, or the spaceship would merely land somewhere. Then, either Barney and Junior, or the ship, would be taken away by the strange creatures on the planet. After some weird mission was carried out, the two astronauts would be reunited with the spaceship and be off on their next mission.

== Cast ==
The show starred Bob Denver as Junior, a grey-haired (Denver was 40 years old at the time) and seemingly dim-witted but uniquely clever NASA maintenance worker, and Chuck McCann as Barney, his plump and grumpy co-worker. Patty Maloney played Honk, their furry little alien friend who made honking sounds out of the horn on the top of his head instead of speaking.

== Episodes ==
| No. | Title | Original release date |
|---|---|---|
| 1 | "It's All in Your Mind" | September 6, 1975 |
G.A.L, a sentient alien computer, decides that it wants Junior's mind to be transferred into its memory banks.
| 2 | "The Crystallites" | September 13, 1975 |
The Crystallites hand pick Junior for a very short reign as their king. Meanwhile, both Junior and Honk turn into green-furred monsters after ingesting a mysterious "coconut milk".
| 3 | "The Robots of Pod" | September 20, 1975 |
Lantana enlists the Space Nuts' help to recover her robot control belt, which has been stolen by Mercurial.
| 4 | "Fantastic Journey" | September 27, 1975 |
Junior, Barney, and Honk contend with mad scientists, a robot, and a giant alien monster that stole their antenna.
| 5 | "Tower of Tagot" | October 4, 1975 |
Junior falls for an alien queen, and duels with the evil despot Tagot in order to save her.
| 6 | "The Three Spaceketeers" | October 11, 1975 |
Convinced that he is totally useless, Junior runs away, only for him and his companions to be recruited to help rescue the ruler of the Sporians.
| 7 | "Flight of the Pippets" | October 18, 1975 |
Junior is captured and shrunk by the Pippets, who see him as just another exhibit for their space museum.
| 8 | "Birds of a Feather" | October 25, 1975 |
Junior and Barney are ordered by King Falco of the Vultrons to sit on and protect the Sovereign Egg. However, two other Vultrons decide to steal the egg, and frame the guys for the theft. Note: Patty Maloney plays both Honk and the Sovereign Hatchling.
| 9 | "Dangerous Game" | November 1, 1975 |
On an uncharted planet, aliens are the predators, and the Space Nuts are the prey.
| 10 | "Secrets of the Hexagon" | November 8, 1975 |
Junior agrees to trade the capsule for the Hexagon, causing no end of trouble.
| 11 | "Captain Torque, Space Pirate" | November 15, 1975 |
Captain Torque orders Junior and Barney to steal a treasure map for him.
| 12 | "Vanishing Aliens Mystery" | November 22, 1975 |
Following the reading of a space will, several of the aliens the Space Nuts met in previous episodes begin to disappear. It is up to them to find out who the culprit is. Note: This episode was inspired by Agatha Christie's "Ten Little Indians", as well as "Scooby-Doo, Where Are You?"
| 13 | "Barney Begonia" | November 29, 1975 |
An alien botanist unleashes radiation that turns Barney into a plant.
| 14 | "Destination: Earth" | December 6, 1975 |
A pair of aliens trick Junior and Barney into returning to Earth without Honk so that they can carry out their invasion plans. This is mostly a clip show as they "travel back in time" revisit old encounters.
| 15 | "Galaxy's Greatest Athlete" | December 13, 1975 |
Two female monsters disguise themselves as beautiful girls, and seduce Barney and Junior into participating in the Intergalactic Games.
