= April 1936 =

Month of 1936

<<	April 1936					>>
Su	Mo	Tu	We	Th	Fr	Sa
			1	2	3	4
5	6	7	8	9	10	11
12	13	14	15	16	17	18
19	20	21	22	23	24	25
26	27	28	29	30

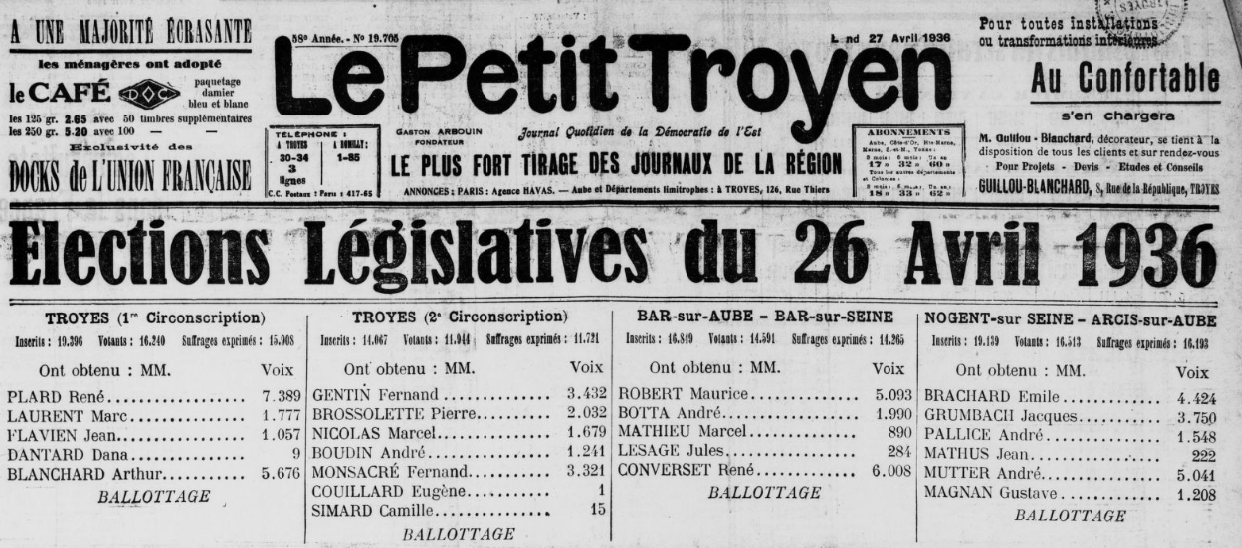
The French newspaper "Petit Troyen" from April 1936

The following events occurred in April 1936:

== April 1, 1936 (Wednesday) ==
- Germany offered a 19-point peace proposal to the other Locarno signatories. None of the points included Germany withdrawing any troops from the Rhineland.
- Austria reintroduced conscription, in violation of the Treaty of Saint-Germain-en-Laye.
- Britain assured France and Belgium of British support in the event of war with Germany.
- The Cordele–Greensboro tornado outbreak killed at least 44 people over this day and the next.
- The Italian bombing of Harar was discussed in the British House of Commons. Hugh Dalton of the Labour Party asked Foreign Minister Anthony Eden if he was aware "that British public opinion is increasingly stirred by these horrible atrocities which are being perpetrated, and when are His Majesty's Government going to take any further step to end it, at least by refusing to supply British oil to these murderous airmen?" Eden replied that the government was just as anxious "to bring this war, and the miserable suffering consequent upon it, to an end."
- John Winthrop Fowler of New York City, a junior at Princeton University, was fatally injured when he fell about 250 feet (76 m) onto rocks while hiking off Mount Washington after skiing in Tuckerman Ravine. Fowler's skiing companion, McKim Daingerfield of Baltimore, Maryland, also fell but survived.

== April 2, 1936 (Thursday) ==
- Germany suspended the export of coal to Italy as a goodwill gesture to Britain.
- Saudi Arabia and Iraq signed a treaty of non-aggression and Arab brotherhood.
- Austria and Czechoslovakia signed a trade agreement.

== April 3, 1936 (Friday) ==
- Germany sent Britain a point-blank refusal to promise not to fortify the Rhineland.
- The British government indicated that it would again apply pressure to impose an oil embargo against Italy unless it ceased its hostilities in Ethiopia, due to the strength of the evidence Britain now had that the Italians were using poison gas.
- Nazi Germany banned Jews from working as veterinarians.
- The shortest pro boxing match in history took place in New Haven, Connecticut when Al Carr knocked out Lew Massey in 10 seconds. This record was equalled in 1946 but not broken until 1984.
- Died: Richard Hauptmann, 36, German-born carpenter convicted of murder in the Lindbergh kidnapping (executed by electric chair)

== April 4, 1936 (Saturday) ==
- On orders from the German Labour Front, industrial workers who did not vote in the March 29 elections were fired from their jobs as "slackers".
- Cambridge won the 88th Boat Race.
- The airship LZ 129 Hindenburg completed its first transatlantic flight, arriving in Rio de Janeiro. From April 6 to 10 it flew back to Germany.

== April 5, 1936 (Sunday) ==
- The Tupelo–Gainesville tornado outbreak struck the Southeastern United States. Over the next two days approximately 454 people were killed.
- Died: Chandler Egan, 51, American golfer

== April 6, 1936 (Monday) ==
- In South Africa, the Representation of Natives Act was passed which further reduced the rights of black citizens.
- Horton Smith won the third Masters Tournament.
- The comic strip Mickey Finn first appeared.

== April 7, 1936 (Tuesday) ==
- Spanish parliament voted President Niceto Alcalá-Zamora out of office by a vote of 238 to 5 after the Socialists brought a motion against him claiming he had acted illegally in dissolving the last parliament. It was the first time Spanish parliament had ever voted a president out of office.
- A Trans Continental and Western Air passenger plane crashed during a fog in Uniontown, Pennsylvania, killing 13 of 15 aboard.
- Died: Marilyn Miller, 37, American stage dancer, singer and actress

== April 8, 1936 (Wednesday) ==
- France countered Germany's peace proposal with its own plan, which included the creation of an international army working through the League of Nations.
- The Soviet Union and Mongolia signed a treaty of mutual assistance to counter Japan's growing power in the Far East.

== April 9, 1936 (Thursday) ==
- Sylvia Sidney and Bennett Cerf were divorced in Los Angeles court.
- Born: Valerie Solanas, feminist writer and attempted assassin of Andy Warhol, in Ventnor City, New Jersey (d. 1988)
- Died: Róbert Bárány, 59, Austro-Hungarian otologist

== April 10, 1936 (Friday) ==
- The Mexican government exiled ex-president Plutarco Elías Calles and union boss Luis Napoleón Morones "for the purpose of maintaining tranquility".
- Born: John Howell, Olympic long jumper, in London, England; John Madden, American football player, coach and commentator, in Austin, Minnesota (d. 2021); Bobby Smith, R&B singer, in Detroit, Michigan (d. 2013)

== April 11, 1936 (Saturday) ==
- Kārlis Ulmanis became the 4th President of Latvia.
- The Detroit Red Wings defeated the Toronto Maple Leafs 3–2 to win the Stanley Cup Finals, three games to one. It was Detroit's first Stanley Cup win in franchise history.
- The first Butlins holiday camp opened in Skegness, England.
- The romantic drama film Desire starring Marlene Dietrich and Gary Cooper was released.

== April 12, 1936 (Sunday) ==
- Italian forces occupied Gallabat.
- A cave-in trapped three men in the Moose River Gold Mines in Nova Scotia. An attempt to rescue them soon got underway.
- Born: Charles Napier, actor, in Mt. Union, Kentucky (d. 2011)
- Died: James M. Beck, 74, American lawyer and politician

== April 13, 1936 (Monday) ==
- Ioannis Metaxas became the new Prime Minister of Greece upon the death of Konstantinos Demertzis.
- Italian forces reached Lake Tana.
- Joe Payne scored 10 goals in a single game during a 12–0 victory by Luton Town over Bristol Rovers.
- Died: Konstantinos Demertzis, 59 or 60, Prime Minister of Greece

== April 14, 1936 (Tuesday) ==
- The Battle of the Ogaden began on the southern front of the Abyssinian War.
- During a parade celebrating the fifth anniversary of the Second Spanish Republic in Madrid, several petards exploded under the presidential reviewing stand. The explosions caused no injuries but several people were trampled in the panic that ensued. Police blamed the attack on fascists.
- A production of William Shakespeare's Macbeth, commonly nicknamed Voodoo Macbeth and directed by Orson Welles, premiered at the Lafayette Theatre in Harlem.
- Born: Kenneth Mars, actor, in Chicago, Illinois (d. 2011)

== April 15, 1936 (Wednesday) ==
- Italian troops occupied Dessie.
- The Arab Revolt in Palestine began.

== April 16, 1936 (Thursday) ==
- The Italian government ordered its citizens to stop requesting permission to adopt Ethiopian babies.

== April 17, 1936 (Friday) ==
- Turkey broke the Treaty of Lausanne by sending troops into the DMZ around the Dardanelles.
- Peace talks in the Second Italo-Ethiopian War broke off in Geneva as the League of Nations essentially concluded that it was too late to save Ethiopia from defeat.
- Five London schoolboys died having been walked into a blizzard by their teacher on Schauinsland mountain in Germany.

== April 18, 1936 (Saturday) ==
- Leeds defeated Warrington 18–2 in front of 51,250 at Wembley Stadium to win the Challenge Cup of rugby.
- Rangers F.C. defeated Third Lanark in the 1935–36 Scottish Cup Final.
- The Irwin Shaw anti-war play Bury the Dead premiered at the Ethel Barrymore Theatre on Broadway.
- Born: "TV Tommy" Ivo, American drag racer and actor
- Died: Ottorino Respighi, 56, Italian composer and musicologist

== April 19, 1936 (Sunday) ==
- Baldur von Schirach said that 90 percent of young Germans were enrolled in the Hitler Youth. He appealed to parents of the remaining 10 percent to enroll their children as well, warning that special laws would be passed if they did not.

== April 20, 1936 (Monday) ==
- Before a military parade celebrating Hitler's 47th birthday, General Werner von Blomberg was promoted to the rank of Generalfeldmarschall.
- The German cruiser Emden began a controversial 10-day goodwill visit to the city of Baltimore, Maryland, sponsored by local German-American groups. Over 2,000 people marched to protest against the cruiser's arrival, but thousands of other Baltimoreans would wait for hours to take tours of the ship during its stay.
- Ellison "Tarzan" Brown won the Boston Marathon.

== April 21, 1936 (Tuesday) ==
- Anti-Jewish riots by Arabs in Tel Aviv killed 11 people and injured 50.
- On Budget Day in the United Kingdom, Chancellor of the Exchequer Neville Chamberlain projected a surplus of nearly £3 million for the next year, but raised taxes to help pay for increased defence spending.
- Born: James Dobson, author and founder of Focus on the Family, in Shreveport, Louisiana

== April 22, 1936 (Wednesday) ==
- Germany announced that Eckener Avenue in Berlin, named after the Zeppelin commander Hugo Eckener, would be renamed Adolf Hitler Street. Eckener had fallen out of favour with the Nazi regime after he declined to release a statement of support for Hitler ahead of the March 29 elections.
- Born: Glen Campbell, country musician, in Delight, Arkansas (d. 2017)

== April 23, 1936 (Thursday) ==
- At 12:44 a.m., rescuers freed two men trapped by a cave-in for over 10 days in the Moose River Gold Mines. A third trapped man had died during the rescue efforts.
- Born: Roy Orbison, singer-songwriter, in Vernon, Texas (d. 1988)

== April 24, 1936 (Friday) ==
- Adolf Hitler formally opened three NS-Ordensburgen (National Socialist Order Castles), elite military schools where future Nazi leaders were to be trained for three years.
- Hitler gave a belated birthday amnesty to minor offenders who had been fined small amounts or sentenced to prison terms not exceeding one month.
- The musical comedy-drama film Captain January starring Shirley Temple was released.
- Born: Glen Hobbie, baseball player, in Witt, Illinois (d. 2013); Jill Ireland, actress and singer, in London, England (d. 1990)

== April 25, 1936 (Saturday) ==
- The Battle of the Ogaden ended in Italian victory.
- Arsenal defeated Sheffield United 1–0 in the FA Cup Final at Wembley Stadium.
- Benito Mussolini inaugurated the new planned town of Aprilia, Lazio.
- The Arab Higher Committee was established.

== April 26, 1936 (Sunday) ==
- Legislative elections were held in France, with run-off elections to be held the following week. The left-wing coalition known as the Popular Front did even better than expected and looked poised to take power.
- The final Italian drive on the Ethiopian capital of Addis Ababa, immortalized in Fascist propaganda as the March of the Iron Will, began.
- Died: Tammany Young, 49, American stage and film actor

== April 27, 1936 (Monday) ==
- An Italian plane dropped leaflets on Addis Ababa threatening to bomb and destroy the city if the advance on the Ethiopian capital met any resistance.
- Hitler appointed Hermann Göring as Commissioner of Raw Materials and Foreign Currencies.
- Joseph Bowers made the first escape attempt from Alcatraz Federal Penitentiary. A tower guard shot him and he fell from a chain link fence to his death.
- Died: Joseph Bowers, 39, American criminal (shot)

== April 28, 1936 (Tuesday) ==
- Farouk became the new King of Egypt upon the death of his father Fuad.
- By a vote of 62–35, the House of Lords passed a bill abolishing the special privilege of trial by peers.
- Died: Fuad I of Egypt, 68, King of Egypt

== April 29, 1936 (Wednesday) ==
- The first professional baseball game in Japan took place. Nagoya defeated Dai Tokyo 8–5.
- Austria sent troops to its German border, fearing invasion.
- Detroit Tigers star Hank Greenberg suffered a season-ending wrist fracture in a collision at first base with Jake Powell. Without their best hitter, the Tigers' hopes of repeating as World Series champions were dashed.
- Near Fairport, Iowa, Iowa State Patrolman and former Green Bay Packers running back Oran Pape was taken hostage at gunpoint during a traffic stop. When Pape grappled with his abductor, the suspect was shot and killed, and Pape was mortally wounded. He died of his injuries the following day.
- Born: Bernie Parrish, American football player, in Long Beach, California (d. 2019); Volker Strassen, mathematician, in Düsseldorf-Gerresheim, Germany
- Died: W. H. Weeks, 72, Canadian-born American architect

== April 30, 1936 (Thursday) ==
- Italian troops occupied Degehabur.
- The British government announced plans to construct 38 new warships.
- Died: A. E. Housman, 77, English classical scholar and poet; Oran Pape, 32, Iowa State Patrolman and former Green Bay Packers running back (murdered in line of duty)
