= January 1936 =

Month of 1936

<<	January 1936					>>
Su	Mo	Tu	We	Th	Fr	Sa
			1	2	3	4
5	6	7	8	9	10	11
12	13	14	15	16	17	18
19	20	21	22	23	24	25
26	27	28	29	30	31

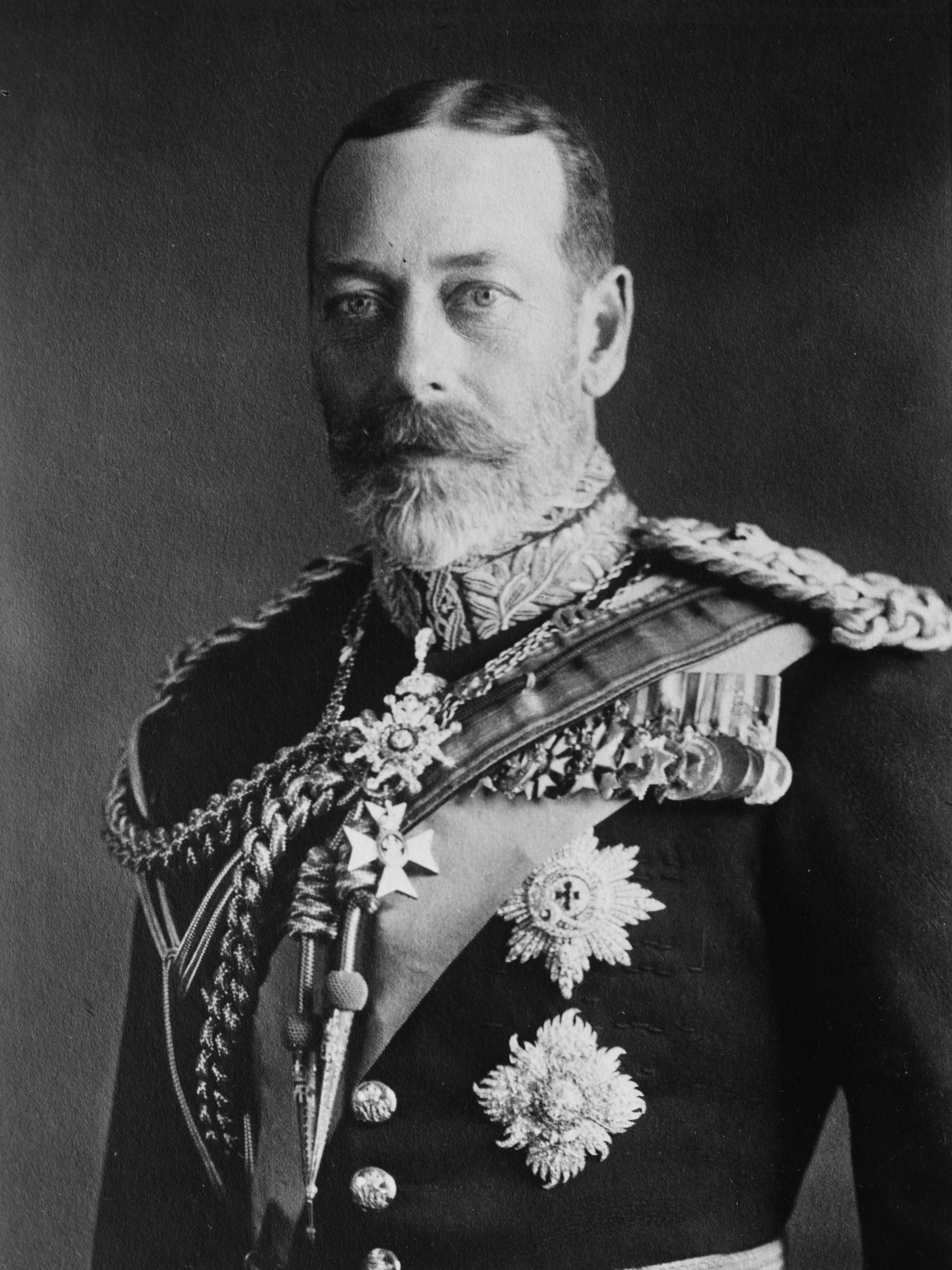
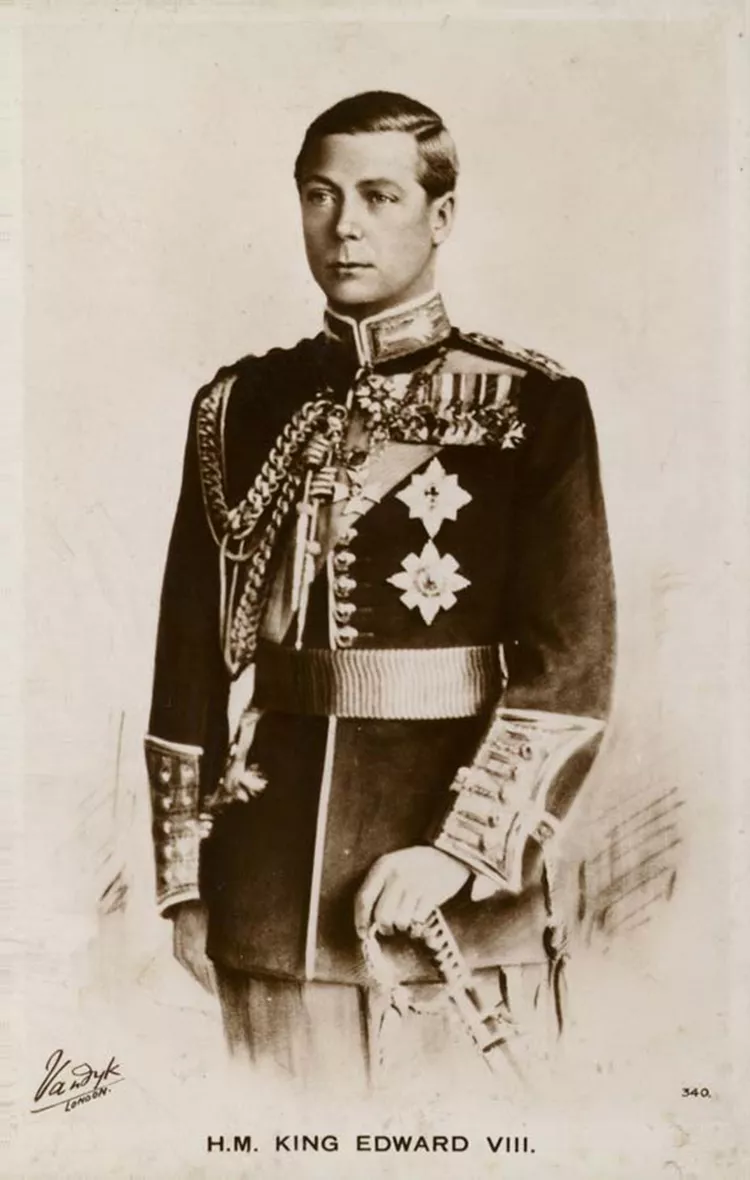
January 20, 1936: King George V dies and is succeeded by King Edward VIII

The following events occurred in January 1936:

== January 1, 1936 (Wednesday) ==
- A new law went into effect in Nazi Germany barring women under 35 from being employed by Jews. 10,000 women lost their jobs as a result.
- Stanford Indians defeated SMU Mustangs 7–0 in the 22nd Rose Bowl.
- In the 2nd Orange Bowl, Catholic University Cardinals beat Ole Miss Rebels 20–19.
- Butlin's was founded in The United Kingdom.
- Born: James Sinegal, American businessman, co-founder and former CEO of Costco

== January 2, 1936 (Thursday) ==
- In a reply to James Grover McDonald's statement of December 29, Germany said that the League of Nations had "every reason to worry first about the manner in which states belonging to the League deal with minorities and confessions within their borders" before concerning itself with Germany's internal affairs.
- The first-ever New York Film Critics Circle Awards were announced. The Informer was named Best Film of 1935.
- Cypress Gardens opened near Winter Haven, Florida.
- Born: Roger Miller, American musician; in Fort Worth, Texas (d. 1992)

== January 3, 1936 (Friday) ==
- U.S. President Franklin D. Roosevelt presented the annual State of the Union address to Congress. The president spoke at length about the international situation and warned that "a point has been reached where the people of the Americas must take cognizance of growing ill-will, of marked trends toward aggression, of increasing armaments, of shortening tempers — a situation which has in it many of the elements that lead to the tragedy of general war." Roosevelt asserted that if another age of war was at hand, "the United States and the rest of the Americas can play but one role: through a well-ordered neutrality to do naught to encourage the contest, through adequate defense to save ourselves from embroilment and attack, and through example and all legitimate encouragement and assistance to persuade other Nations to return to the ways of peace and good-will."
- The Polish government freed 27,000 prisoners under a general amnesty.
- The comedy-drama film Riffraff, starring Jean Harlow and Spencer Tracy, was released.

== January 4, 1936 (Saturday) ==
- England defeated the New Zealand All Blacks for the first time in a Rugby Union international match, 13–0. Alexander Obolensky became a national hero when he scored two tries.
- This is the cover date of Billboard magazine's first published hit parade, listing the most popular recordings in the United States.
- The George Bernard Shaw play The Millionairess had its world premiere in Vienna.
- Died:
  - James Churchward, 84, English occult writer
  - Robert Walter Richard Ernst von Görschen, 71, German government councillor

== January 5, 1936 (Sunday) ==
- Italian planes bombed Degehabur in Ethiopia as the Second Italo-Ethiopian War continued.
- The radio drama Famous Jury Trials premiered on WLW in Cincinnati, Ohio.
- Born: Florence King, U.S. writer; in Washington, D.C. (d. 2016)
- Died: Ramón del Valle-Inclán, 69, Spanish dramatist

== January 6, 1936 (Monday) ==
- The U.S. Supreme Court decided United States v. Butler, finding the processing taxes of the Agricultural Adjustment Act unconstitutional.
- The German cruiser Admiral Graf Spee entered service.
- The Agatha Christie detective novel The A.B.C. Murders was first published.
- Born:
  - Nida Blanca, Philippine actress; in Gapan (d. 2001)
  - Julio María Sanguinetti, President of Uruguay; in Montevideo
- Died: Louise Bryant, 50, American journalist

== January 7, 1936 (Tuesday) ==
- The Spanish Cortes Generales was dissolved and new elections called for February.
- Iran became the first Muslim country to ban the wearing of veils in public. In the years prior to the 1979 Revolution, Iran celebrated January 7 as Women's Day to mark this event.

== January 8, 1936 (Wednesday) ==
- Ethiopia asked the League of Nations to dispatch a commission to investigate the use of poison gas by Italian troops.
- The Dominican capital city Santo Domingo was renamed Ciudad Trujilo to honor Rafael Trujilo
- Jewish booksellers throughout Nazi Germany were ordered to turn in their Reich Publications Chamber membership cards, without which no one was permitted to sell books.
- Reza Shah of Iran issued the Kashf-e hijab decree, ordering police to remove the hijab from any woman in public.
- Born: Robert May, Baron May of Oxford, Australian scientist, in Sydney (d. 2020)

== January 9, 1936 (Thursday) ==
- An earthquake centred in Túquerres, Colombia killed 250 people.
- The Democratic National Committee endorsed U.S. President Franklin D. Roosevelt for re-election in 1936.
- Died: John Gilbert, 38, American actor, died of a heart attack

== January 10, 1936 (Friday) ==
- General elections were held in Cuba. Miguel Mariano Gómez was elected the country's new president.
- The Dominican Republic's capital city of Santo Domingo was renamed Ciudad Trujillo (Trujillo City), after the country's ruler Rafael Trujillo.
- The far-right political league Croix-de-Feu was dissolved in France.
- The French Social Party was formed.
- Born:
  - Stephen E. Ambrose, U.S. historian, in Lovington, Illinois (d. 2002)
  - Burnum Burnum, Australian Aboriginal activist; at Wallaga Lake, New South Wales (d. 1997)
  - Robert W. Wilson, American astronomer and 1978 Nobel Prize in Physics laureate; in Houston

== January 11, 1936 (Saturday) ==
- The Oberkommando der Marine was formed in Germany.
- The Executive Order on the Reich Tax Law forbade Jews from serving as tax consultants in Germany.
- The Warner Bros. short cartoon I Wanna Play House was released, the first with "target" titles.
- Born: Eva Hesse, Jewish German-born American sculptor; in Hamburg (d. 1970)

== January 12, 1936 (Sunday) ==
- The Battle of Ganale Doria began on the Ethiopian southern front.
- Born: Émile Lahoud, President of Lebanon, 1998 to 2007; in Beirut
- Died: John Francis Hylan, 67, Mayor of New York City 1918 to 1925

== January 13, 1936 (Monday) ==
- The city of Saarlouis in the Saarland had its name Germanized to Saarlautern.

== January 14, 1936 (Tuesday) ==
- Howard Hughes set a new transcontinental flight record, completing a non-stop flight from Los Angeles to Newark, New Jersey in 9 hours 27 minutes 10 seconds.
- An American Airlines passenger plane crashed in Goodwin, Arkansas, killing all 17 people aboard. The cause of the crash was never determined.

== January 15, 1936 (Wednesday) ==
- Japan quit the London Naval Conference after rejecting tonnage limitations on various types of warships.
- Died:
  - Henry Forster, 1st Baron Forster, 69, British politician, Governor-General of Australia from 1920 to 1925
  - George Landenberger, 56, U.S. Navy captain and Governor of American Samoa 1932 to 1934

== January 16, 1936 (Thursday) ==
- The Battle of Ganale Doria ended in an Italian victory.
- Mussolini sent a letter to the International Committee of the Red Cross referring to the Italian bombing of hospitals in Ethiopia as a series of "accidents".
- New Jersey Governor Harold G. Hoffman granted Richard Hauptmann a stay of execution, 28 hours before Hauptmann was scheduled to die in the electric chair.
- Died: Albert Fish, 65, American serial killer and cannibal, was executed in the electric chair.

== January 17, 1936 (Friday) ==
- In Paris, the trial in the Stavisky Affair ended with 9 convictions and 11 acquittals.
- Joseph Goebbels said in a speech in Berlin that Germany's colonies lost in the Treaty of Versailles must be returned. In this speech he also made the famous "guns versus butter" comparison, saying, "We can manage without butter but not, for example, without guns. If we are attacked we can only defend ourselves with guns, not with butter."

== January 18, 1936 (Saturday) ==
- The Metropolitan Benjamin was elected Ecumenical Patriarch of Constantinople to succeed Photios II, who died December 29.
- Died: Rudyard Kipling, 70, English writer

== January 19, 1936 (Sunday) ==
- A memorial to Theodore Roosevelt was dedicated in New York City. President Franklin D. Roosevelt made a speech paying tribute to his predecessor in the office and fourth cousin, describing him as "a great patriot and a great soul."

== January 20, 1936 (Monday) ==
- King George V died at the age of 70 in the presence of his immediate family at Sandringham House at five minutes to midnight after a four-day bronchial illness. His eldest son Edward became the new king.
- Italians captured what remained of the town of Negele Borana which had nearly been destroyed by bombing.
- The Christmas Offensive ended in an Ethiopian tactical victory over Italy.
- The First Battle of Tembien began on Ethiopia's northern front.
- A general strike began in Syria.
- Born: Frances Shand Kydd, mother of Diana, Princess of Wales, at Sandringham, Norfolk, England (d. 2004)

== January 21, 1936 (Tuesday) ==
- Bolivia and Paraguay signed a final peace treaty ending the Chaco War.
- The new King of the United Kingdom, Edward VIII flew from Sandringham House to London for the traditional pledges at St James's Palace, swearing to uphold the Church of England and receiving the oath of allegiance from the Privy Council.
- Richard W. Leche won the Louisiana gubernatorial election.
- Paul Hindemith wrote Trauermusik, on very short notice, for the late George V.
- Died: Arthur Dalrymple Fanshawe, 88, British admiral

== January 22, 1936 (Wednesday) ==
- Pierre Laval resigned as Prime Minister of France after the Radical-Socialist Party factions withdrew their support for his government.
- The U.S. House of Representatives passed the Adjusted Compensation Payment Bill and turned it over to President Roosevelt for signature or veto.
- Born: Ong Teng Cheong, President of Singapore 1993 to 1999; in Singapore (d. 2002)

== January 23, 1936 (Thursday) ==
- The final death toll in a cold wave, centered on the Midwestern United States, reached 54.
- The body of George V was brought to Westminster Abbey to lie in state for four days.
- Alexander Hore-Ruthven, 1st Earl of Gowrie became the 10th Governor-General of Australia.
- Born:
  - Arlene Golonka, actress known for The Andy Griffith Show; in Chicago (d. 2021);
  - Jerry Kramer, American football player and author; in Jordan, Montana
- Died: John C. Mills, 25, member of the Mills Brothers vocal group, died of pneumonia

== January 24, 1936 (Friday) ==
- Albert Sarraut became the new French Prime Minister.
- President Roosevelt sent a short handwritten message saying he would not sign the Adjusted Compensation Payment Bill, explaining that it only differed in two respects from the bill he had already vetoed at the last session. Prior to this note, Theodore Roosevelt had been the last president to write a veto message by hand. The House promptly took a vote and overrode the presidential veto by a count of 324 to 61.
- The First Battle of Tembien ended in a draw.
- Died: Harry Peach, 61, English businessman and author

== January 25, 1936 (Saturday) ==
- Al Smith announced in a radio address that due to his opposition to the New Deal, he would not be supporting Roosevelt in the 1936 election campaign as he had in 1932.
- General Francisco Franco was selected as Spain's representative to attend the funeral of George V.

== January 26, 1936 (Sunday) ==
- Parliamentary elections were held in Greece and won by the Liberal Party.

== January 27, 1936 (Monday) ==
- The U.S. Senate passed the Adjusted Compensation Payment Act by overriding the president's veto by a vote of 76 to 19.
- Born: Troy Donahue, U.S. actor and singer; in New York City (d. 2001)

== January 28, 1936 (Tuesday) ==
- An article "Muddle Instead of Music" was published anonymously, almost certainly with Stalin's approval, in the Soviet newspaper Pravda, denouncing Dmitri Shostakovich's opera Lady Macbeth of the Mtsensk District. Two further attacks followed and Shostakovich was persuaded not to go ahead with the premiere of his Symphony No. 4 later in the year.
- The funeral of George V was held. Britain observed 2 minutes of silence at 1:30 p.m. as he was interred at St George's Chapel, Windsor Castle.
- Born:
  - Alan Alda, American actor, director and screenwriter, known for the TV series M*A*S*H; in New York City
  - Ismail Kadare, Albanian novelist and poet; in Gjirokastër (d. 2024)
- Died:
  - Oscar K. Allen, 53, Governor of Louisiana since 1932, died of a brain hemorrhage, one week after winning the Democratic Primary to fill the U.S. Senate seat that had been held by the late Huey Long
  - Richard Loeb of the notorious Leopold and Loeb murder duo was slashed to death with a razor by a fellow inmate in Stateville Penitentiary

== January 29, 1936 (Wednesday) ==
- The Baseball Hall of Fame announced its first five inductees: Ty Cobb, Babe Ruth, Honus Wagner, Christy Mathewson and Walter Johnson. The official induction ceremony was held three years later on June 12, 1939.
- The Soviet Academy of Sciences announced that it had revived insects and lobsters buried 3,000 years ago under Siberian permafrost.
- Born:
  - Patrick Caulfield, British painter; in Acton, London (d. 2005)
  - James Jamerson, American bass player, in Edisto, South Carolina (d. 1983)
  - Walter Lewin, Dutch astrophysicist; in The Hague

== January 30, 1936 (Thursday) ==
- Ali Mahir Pasha became Prime Minister of Egypt.
- Another border incident between the Soviet Union and Manchukuo occurred. 3 Russians were killed in a skirmish with Japanese-Manchukuan troops.
- The new owners of the Boston Braves baseball club asked newspapermen to come up with a new nickname for the team based on suggestions by fans. The nickname of Bees was soon chosen, but it never really caught on and the team's nickname was reverted to the Braves after the 1940 season.
- The musical revue Ziegfeld Follies of 1936 with music by Vernon Duke and lyrics by Ira Gershwin premiered at the Winter Garden Theater on Broadway.

== January 31, 1936 (Friday) ==
- The radio adventure program Green Hornet premiered on WXYZ in Detroit.
