= October 1935 =

Month of 1935

<<	October 1935					>>
Su	Mo	Tu	We	Th	Fr	Sa
		1	2	3	4	5
6	7	8	9	10	11	12
13	14	15	16	17	18	19
20	21	22	23	24	25	26
27	28	29	30	31

The following events occurred in October 1935:

== October 1, 1935 (Tuesday) ==
- A new law went into effect in Siam that no longer recognized polygamy.
- Sport became mandatory in German schools.
- The Boston Housing Authority was formed.
- Born:
  - Julie Andrews, actress and singer, in Walton-on-Thames, England
  - Julio Jaramillo, singer, in Guayaquil, Ecuador (d. 1978)
  - Teruyoshi Nakano, special effects director, in Andong Province, Manchukuo (d. 2022)

== October 2, 1935 (Wednesday) ==
- Unconfirmed reports circulated of a battle between Italians and Ethiopians in the vicinity of Mousa Ali. Italian officials denied the reports.
- Benito Mussolini gave a radio address in Rome informing Italians that "A solemn hour is about to sound in the history of the fatherland ... For many months the wheels of destiny have been moving toward their goal under the impulse of our calm determination. In the latter hours their rhythm has become more swift and by now cannot be stopped. It is not only an army that strives towards its objectives but a whole people of 44 million souls against whom an attempt is being made to consumnate the blackest of injustices – that of depriving us of some small place in the sun."
- Bulgaria imposed a state of emergency after a failed coup against the government.
- Born: Robert Henry Lawrence, Jr., astronaut, in Chicago, Illinois (d. 1967)

== October 3, 1935 (Thursday) ==
- League of Nations officials announced that they had received a communication from Ethiopia asserting that Adwa had been bombed by Italian warplanes. Emperor Haile Selassie informed a Reuters correspondent: "I have just received the news that the first bombs dropped by Italian planes on Adwa fell on the Red Cross Hospital there, killing and wounding nurses." The Second Italo-Ethiopian War had begun.
- Haile Selassie ordered a general mobilization.
- The first phase of the war began with De Bono's invasion of Abyssinia in the north.
- Nazi Germany declared neutrality in the Ethiopian conflict.
- Born: Charles Duke, American astronaut, U.S. Air Force pilot, and test pilot, in Charlotte, North Carolina; Armen Dzhigarkhanyan, Soviet Russian-Armenian actor, in Yerevan, Armenian SSR (d. 2020); Sinikka Kurkinen, painter, in Joutseno, Finland

== October 4, 1935 (Friday) ==
- France informed Britain that it would support the enforcement of sanctions against Italy and pledged military support in the event of any attack that arose from them.
- Italian forces captured Adigrat and Enticho.
- The Italian delegation at the League of Nations maintained that Italy was not waging war, but was only engaged in "military police measures to establish order."
- Luna Park opened in Sydney, Australia.
- Died: Jean Béraud, 86, French painter

== October 5, 1935 (Saturday) ==
- U.S. President Franklin D. Roosevelt invoked the August 31 Neutrality Act to place an arms embargo on both Italy and Ethiopia.
- Collingwood defeated South Melbourne in the 39th Victorian Football League Grand Final.

== October 6, 1935 (Sunday) ==
- Italian forces captured Adwa.
- Haile Selassie made another public statement to the world through the Associated Press, saying, "Mr. Mussolini charges us with being barbarians and says he wishes to civilize us. Is the wanton slaughter of women and children by air bombs and machine guns the kind of civilization he wishes to give us? ... Despite the fact that our empire is faced with the gravest crisis of its long and glorious history – a crisis with which we have always striven to live in peace and amity – we still place all our faith in the League of Nations, which is pledged to defend its members, the small as well as the great, from unjustifiable aggression."
- Communists in Mexico City tore the swastika flag from Germany's honorary consulate and dragged it through the streets.
- Born: Bruno Sammartino, professional wrestler, in Abruzzo, Italy (d. 2018); Charito Solis, film actress, in Tondo, Manila, Philippines (d. 1998)

== October 7, 1935 (Monday) ==
- By unanimous vote, the League of Nations declared Italy guilty of committing an act of war against all members of the organization by invading Abyssinia. The vote laid the basis for economic sanctions.
- The Detroit Tigers won the World Series with a 4–3 victory over the Chicago Cubs in Game 6.
- The French dockworker's union called on its members to boycott the loading and unloading of Italian ships.
- The United States Supreme Court moved to the new $10 million Supreme Court Building.
- Five people were arrested in Los Angeles as suspects in a plot to extort $1,000 from Mae West by sending letters threatening to kill her or disfigure her by throwing acid in her face.
- Died: Francis Wilson, 81, American actor

== October 8, 1935 (Tuesday) ==
- Mussolini forbade anyone from bringing more than 2,000 lire into Italy at a time. Tourists had been changing their money for Italian currency in adjoining countries at a considerable discount.
- Clement Attlee was appointed the interim leader of the Labour Party.

== October 9, 1935 (Wednesday) ==
- Austria and Hungary announced that they would not co-operate with the League of Nations in applying any sanctions against Italy.
- The film A Midsummer Night's Dream, adapted from the William Shakespeare play of the same name, premiered at the Hollywood Theatre in New York.
- Born: Prince Edward, Duke of Kent, in Belgrave Square, London, England

== October 10, 1935 (Thursday) ==
- Greek President Alexandros Zaimis was deposed in a military coup. Panagis Tsaldaris was forced to resign and was succeeded by Georgios Kondylis.
- Ethiopian commander Haile Selassie Gugsa defected to the Italian side.
- The Langenberg transmission tower was destroyed by a tornado.
- Six American countries met to define the new border between Paraguay and Bolivia after the Chaco War.

== October 11, 1935 (Friday) ==
- The League of Nations applied its first round of sanctions against Italy, imposing a general arms embargo against the country. Members were asked to take steps to prevent arms from passing indirectly to Italy through any third party such as Austria.
- Joan Crawford and Franchot Tone were married in Englewood Cliffs, New Jersey.

== October 12, 1935 (Saturday) ==
- Nazi Germany banned jazz from the radio.
- An incident took place at the border between Siberia and Manchukuo near Grodekovo. Events in the clash between a Japanese-Manchukuan detachment and Soviet border guards were disputed, but several were killed on both sides.
- Born: Tony Kubek, baseball player, in Milwaukee, Wisconsin; Luciano Pavarotti, operatic tenor, in Modena, Italy (d. 2007)

== October 13, 1935 (Sunday) ==
- The Soviet Union directed a note of protest to Japan over the border incident, accusing the Japanese-Manchukuan detachment of crossing into the USSR by nearly a mile. The Japanese contended that it was the Russians who crossed the border.

== October 14, 1935 (Monday) ==
- The Canadian federal election was held. The Liberal Party led by William Lyon Mackenzie King was swept back into power.
- The Turkish government had all Masonic lodges in the country abolished on the ground that Masonic principles are incompatible with nationalistic policy and their property transferred to the state.
- Richard Hauptmann was given 30 days' grace to appeal his murder conviction to the U.S. Supreme Court.
- The Hornibrook Bridge opened in Bramble Bay, Queensland, Australia.
- Born: La Monte Young, minimalist composer, in Bern, Idaho

== October 15, 1935 (Tuesday) ==
- Axum fell to the Italians.
- Germany's Naval Gazette revealed that 21 U-boats had already been launched.
- Six one-act plays in the Noël Coward play cycle Tonight at 8.30 were performed for the first time in Manchester.
- Born: Barry McGuire, singer-songwriter, in Oklahoma City, Oklahoma; Bobby Morrow, sprinter, in Harlingen, Texas (d. 2020); Willie O'Ree, ice hockey player, in Fredericton, New Brunswick

== October 16, 1935 (Wednesday) ==
- The owners of the Nine Mile Point Colliery in the South Wales Valleys announced that the mine was closing indefinitely after a day of fighting between police and striking miners protesting against the employment of non-union workers.
- The Massachusetts Handicap horse race was inaugurated.
- Born: Sugar Pie DeSanto, rhythm and blues singer, in Brooklyn, New York (d. 2024); Sabiha Khanum, actress, in Gujrat, Punjab, British India (d. 2020)

== October 17, 1935 (Thursday) ==
- Hans Schweitzer was appointed Germany's Reichsbeauftragten für künstlerische Formgebung (Reich Commissioner for Artistic Design).

== October 18, 1935 (Friday) ==
- The Helena earthquake occurred in Montana.
- The German cabinet convened in Berlin for its first fall session and promulgated a new law forbidding marriage in the case of either party having a hereditary disease. The official publication of the Nuremberg Laws was postponed due to fears of an international boycott of the 1936 Summer Olympics if they went into effect beforehand.
- In the port of Alexandria, two boiler explosions on the Italian liner Ausonia killed 6 and injured 20. British vessels in the area including the hospital ship Maine rendered assistance.
- The historical drama film The Last Days of Pompeii was released.
- Born: Peter Boyle, actor, in Norristown, Pennsylvania (d. 2006)
- Died: Gaston Lachaise, 53, French-born American sculptor

== October 19, 1935 (Saturday) ==
- The sanctions committee of the League of Nations approved a British proposal for a complete boycott of Italian goods.

== October 20, 1935 (Sunday) ==
- The Long March of the Chinese Red Army ended. The March lasted 368 days and covered 6,000 miles.
- Born: Jerry Orbach, actor and singer, in the Bronx, New York (d. 2004)
- Died: Adolphus Greely, 91, American polar explorer and U.S. Army officer; Arthur Henderson, 72, British politician; Sidney Smith, 58, American cartoonist (auto accident)

== October 21, 1935 (Monday) ==
- Germany formally ended its membership in the League of Nations. Germany had announced its withdrawal from the League two years earlier, but had to wait until now for all its obligations to expire.
- Argentina joined the World Court.
- Grant v Australian Knitting Mills, a landmark case in consumer law, was decided on appeal in the Judicial Committee of the Privy Council in the U.K.
- Born: Derek Bell, musician, in Belfast, Northern Ireland (d. 2002)

== October 22, 1935 (Tuesday) ==
- The Jérémie hurricane left three dead and four injured in Santiago de Cuba. The USS Houston, bearing President Roosevelt home from a fishing trip, avoided the hurricane.
- Born: Ann Rule, true crime writer, in Lowell, Michigan (d. 2015)
- Died: Tommy Tucker, 71, American baseball player

== October 23, 1935 (Wednesday) ==
- William Lyon Mackenzie King became Prime Minister of Canada for the third time.
- A brush fire in Malibu, California threatened the homes of several movie stars. Residences belonging to Lionel Atwill and Charles Farrell were destroyed, though they were unoccupied at the time.
- Died: Charles Demuth, 51, American watercolorist and painter; Dutch Schultz, 34, American mobster was assassinated along with Abe Landau, Otto Berman, and Bernard "Lulu" Rosencrantz at a saloon in Newark, New Jersey in what became known as The Chophouse Massacre.

== October 24, 1935 (Thursday) ==
- The Río Piedras massacre occurred at the University of Puerto Rico in Río Piedras.
- Winston Churchill warned that Nazi Germany was a greater threat to peace than the war in Abyssinia. "We cannot afford to see Nazidom in its present phase of cruelty and intolerance, with all its hatreds and all its gleaming weapons, paramount in Europe at the present time", he told the House of Commons.

== October 25, 1935 (Friday) ==
- 2,500 died in Haiti from floods caused by the Jérémie hurricane.
- British Parliament was dissolved and a general election called for November 14.
- Clement Attlee was elected leader of the Labour Party.
- The underground miners' strike ended in South Wales.

== October 26, 1935 (Saturday) ==
- Due to a food shortage in the Rhineland-Palatinate and Saarland, Nazi Germany proclaimed meatless and butterless days for those regions on Mondays, Wednesdays and Fridays.
- During a speech commemorating the 13th anniversary of the March on Rome, Benito Mussolini called international sanctions against Italy "the most odious of injustices".
- Born: Gloria Conyers Hewitt, mathematician, in Sumter, South Carolina

== October 27, 1935 (Sunday) ==
- Albert Einstein and Thomas Mann endorsed Carl von Ossietzky for the Nobel Peace Prize. Ossietzky had been imprisoned in the Esterwegen concentration camp since February 1934.
- Born: Frank Adonis, actor, in Brooklyn, New York (d. 2018)

== October 28, 1935 (Monday) ==
- Civilians in Mek'ele were ordered to evacuate in anticipation of an Italian offensive.

== October 29, 1935 (Tuesday) ==
- Mussolini proclaimed food restrictions, going into effect November 5, in order to fight the effects of boycotting and sanctions. Butcher shops were to close on Tuesdays and were forbidden from selling beef, veal, mutton, lamb or pork on Wednesdays. Since butcher shops already usually closed on Thursdays and most Italians refrained from eating meat on Fridays, the decree amounted to a half-week ban on meat.
- Nazi Germany partially lifted the February 21 gag order on Jewish philosopher Martin Buber. He was permitted to continue his teaching activities as they promoted the emigration of young Jews to Palestine.
- Born: Isao Takahata, filmmaker and co-founder of Studio Ghibli, in Ise, Mie, Japan (d. 2018)

== October 30, 1935 (Wednesday) ==
- Nazi Germany announced a general inspection of all vehicles in the country to determine and catalogue their suitability for military use in the event of an emergency.
- Germany instructed its ambassador in Britain to lodge a protest over an article written by Winston Churchill in The Strand Magazine. In the article, Churchill wrote that "history is replete with examples of men who have risen to power by employing stern, grim, wicked and even frightful methods, but who, nevertheless, when their life is revealed as a whole, have been regarded as great figures whose lives have enriched the story of mankind. So may it be with Hitler." According to Churchill, time would tell whether Hitler would go down in history as "a monster or a hero."
- Born: Robert Caro, journalist and author, in New York City; Agota Kristof, writer, in Csikvánd, Hungary (d. 2011); Jim Perry, baseball player, in Williamston, North Carolina

== October 31, 1935 (Thursday) ==
- Angry Italians staged anti-British demonstrations in Rome. Students shouted anti-British slogans and vandalized shop signs that were written in English.
- In Chicago, Big Joe Williams and the Washboard Blues Singers made the first recording of the classic blues song "Baby, Please Don't Go".
- The British government said it would raise the school-leaving age from 14 to 15.
- John Henry Lewis defeated Bob Olin in St. Louis for the World Light Heavyweight Championship of boxing.
- Born: Ronald Graham, mathematician, in Taft, California (d. 2020)
