= 1936 Nicaraguan presidential election =

Presidential elections were held in Nicaragua on 9 June 1936.

On 31 May 1936 Somoza's forces attacked Managua. On 6 June President Juan Bautista Sacasa and Vice-president Rodolfo Espinosa Ramírez resigned and Julián Irías (Minister of Gobernacion) was appointed acting president. On 6 June Sacasa sailed for exile in El Salvador. “Julián Irías' term as President was very brief. Somoza made one attempt to see him, but Irias was drunk and nothing was accomplished”.

On 9 June the Congress unanimously accepted the resignations of the President Juan Bautista Sacasa and Vice President Rodolfo Espinosa Ramírez and unanimously selected Somoza’s choice as Provisional President, Carlos Alberto Brenes Jarquín. “The Conservatives in Congress justified their vote by saying they were interested in a peaceful solution to the present crisis but that they wanted to be known as the party of opposition and reserved the right to name a candidate in the presidential elections”.

“All relatives of incumbent presidents were forbidden by the constitution from standing for office for a period of six months. Somoza, as the husband of ex-President Sacasa’s niece, came into this category. Somoza sorted out this problem by having the elections put back from November to December”.

== Bibliography ==
- Barquero, Sara L. Gobernantes de Nicaragua, 1825–1947. Managua: Publicaciones del Ministerio de Instrucción Pública. Second edition. 1945.
- Cardenal Tellería, Marco A. Nicaragua y su historia: cronología del acontecer histórico y construcción de la nación nicaragüense. Managua: Banco Mercantíl. Volume I: 1502–1936. 2000.
- Elections in the Americas A Data Handbook Volume 1. North America, Central America, and the Caribbean. Edited by Dieter Nohlen. 2005.
- MacRenato, Ternot. 1991. Somoza: seizure of power, 1926–1939. La Jolla: University of California, San Diego.
- Millett, Richard. Guardians of the dynasty: a history of the U.S. created Guardia Nacional de Nicaragua and the Somoza Family. Maryknoll: Orbis Books. 1977. Pp. 180–181.
- Political handbook of the world 1937. New York, 1938.
- Smith, Hazel. Nicaragua: self-determination and survival. London : Pluto Press. 1993.
- Walter, Knut. The regime of Anastasio Somoza, 1936–1956. Chapel Hill: The University of North Carolina. 1993.
