= Patty Maloney =

American actress (1936–2025)

- Born: Patricia Anne Maloney; March 17, 1936; Perkinsville, New York, U.S.
- Died: March 31, 2025 (aged 89); Winter Park, Florida, U.S.
- Occupation: Actress
- Years active: 1973–2005
- Height: 119 cm (3 ft 11 in)
- Spouse: Joseph Vitek (m. 1961; died 1968)

Patricia Anne Maloney (March 17, 1936 – March 31, 2025) was an American actress.

== Early life ==
Maloney was born in Perkinsville, New York, and was raised in Winter Park, Florida, by her mother and stepfather. Standing 3 feet 11 inches (119 cm) and weighing 60 pounds (27 kg), she performed in carnivals and circuses in her youth. She married Joseph Vitek in 1961. During their marriage, she worked as a keypunch operator at Clipper Carloading in Chicago. After Vitek died from melanoma in 1968, her friends encouraged her to return to performing as a way to deal with grief.

== Career ==
Maloney was best known as Honk from Far Out Space Nuts, as Lumpy from the Star Wars Holiday Special, and as Darla Hood from the animated TV series version of The Little Rascals. She appeared in Star Trek: Voyager in 1996.

She was often a guest on the 1970s variety series Donny & Marie, and portrayed the robot waitress Tina in the Buck Rogers in the 25th Century episode "Cruise Ship to the Stars" and Twiki in the episode "Space Vampire".

In 1977 she appeared in the episode "Ida Works Out" on Rhoda as a witch on Halloween looking for a costume party in Rhoda's apartment building.

From 1982, she was also an animation voice actor, worked on the Monopoly game show pilot as Rich Uncle Pennybags/Mr. Monopoly, and even operated the Crypt Keeper puppet on Tales from the Crypt. Maloney appeared in Ernest Saves Christmas with California native Buddy Douglas as Santa's two elves. In 2011, she appeared as herself in Hanlet: Episode 4 1/2 – Attack of the Phantom Special, an independent documentary film about the making of Star Wars Holiday Special.

Another of her voice roles was in 1988, alongside Jeff Cohen, Glynis Johns, and Casey Kasem in the movie Scooby-Doo and the Ghoul School as Tanis the Mummy.

== Illness and death ==
In 2010, Maloney was diagnosed with age-related macular degeneration, a visual impairment which severely limited her ability to read scripts and other textual matter. After suffering several strokes, she died in Winter Park on March 31, 2025, at the age of 89.

== Filmography ==
=== Film ===
Year	Title	Role	Notes
1978	The Lord of the Rings	Voice	
1981	Under the Rainbow	Rosie	
1984	The Ice Pirates	Waitress	
1984	Swing Shift	Laverne	
1988	Ernest Saves Christmas	Thisbe	
1991	The Addams Family	Lois Addams	
1999	Twin Falls Idaho	June	

=== Television ===
Year	Title	Role	Notes
1973	Don't Be Afraid of the Dark	Creature	Television film
1974	Punch and Jody	Mrs. Stilts	Television film
1975	Far Out Space Nuts	Honk	9 episodes
1976	Don't Call Us	Sylvia	Television film
1976, 1977	The Brady Bunch Hour	Various roles	2 episodes
1977	Mary Hartman, Mary Hartman	Skipper	5 episodes
1977	Charlie's Angels	Tinkle Belle	Episode: "Circus of Terror"
1977	Rhoda	Witch	Episode: "Ida Works Out"
1978	Star Wars Holiday Special	Lumpy	Television film
1978	The Love Boat	Dottie Warren	Episode: "The Little People"
1978	The Krofft Superstar Hour	Various roles	13 episodes
1979–1980	Buck Rogers in the 25th Century	Twiki / Tina	3 episodes
1981	Side Show	Thelma Tiny	Television film
1982	Little House on the Prairie	Alice Bates	Episode: "Little Lou"
1982	Madame's Place	Patty, the Secretary	Episode: Pilot
1982–1983	The Little Rascals	Darla	31 episodes
1984	Trapper John, M.D.	Megan	Episode: "A Little Knife Music"
1984	Pryor's Place	Dumb #1	Episode: "Voyage to the Planet of the Dumb"
1984	The Smurfs	Blue Eyes	2 episodes
1985	Amazing Stories	Alien	Episode: "Fine Tuning"
1985–1986	Dumbo's Circus	Dink the Koala Bear	81 episodes
1986	Barnum	Older Tom Thumb	Television film
1986	Zoobilee Zoo	Ergo	Episode: "Close Encounters of a Zooble Kind"
1987	Throb	Little Woman	Episode: "Death Be Not Weird"
1987	Out of This World	Baby Neil	Episode: "Baby Talk"
1988	Circus	Maggie	Television film
1988	Scooby-Doo and the Ghoul School	Tanis the Mummy (voice)	Television film
1990	Married... with Children	Alien	Episode: "Married... with Aliens"
1995	Legend	Zorelda Tombs	Episode: "Clueless in San Francisco"
1995	A.J.'s Time Travelers	B.I.T.	33 episodes
1996	Star Trek: Voyager	Little Woman	Episode: "The Thaw"
1997	Pearl	Maggie	Episode: "Billy Returns"
1997	The New Batman Adventures	Mrs. Segar (voice)	Episode: "Double Talk"
1998	Nash Bridges	Tricia	Episode: "The Tourist"
2005	My Name Is Earl	Woman with Chimney	Episode: "Teacher Earl"
