= Perkinsville, New York =

Perkinsville
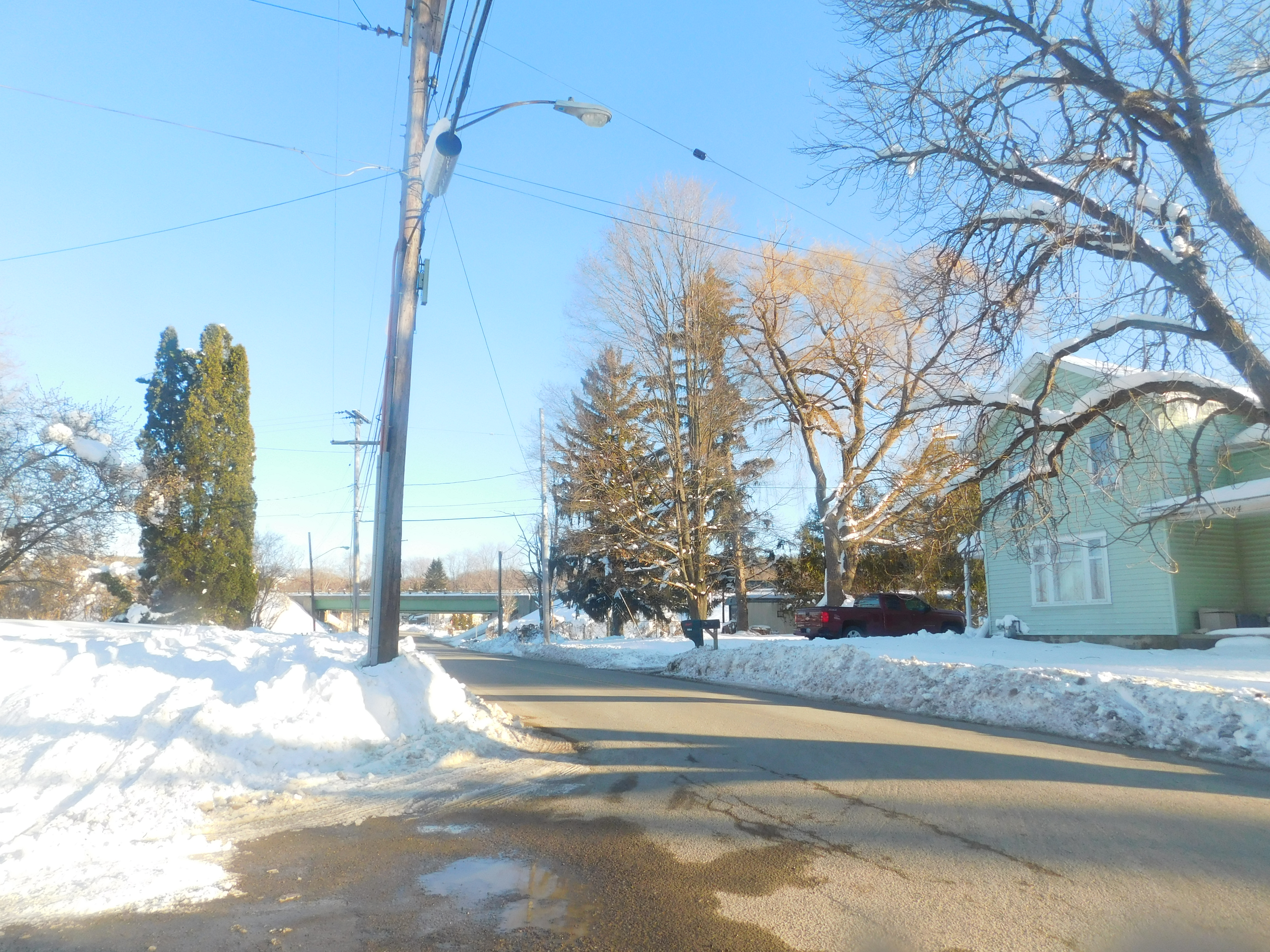
- Perkinsville in March 2018.

- Location in New York
- Coordinates: 42°32′23″N 77°37′41″W
- Country: United States
- State: New York
- County: Steuben

Perkinsville is a locale in Steuben County in the U.S. state of New York. It is the birthplace of Patty Maloney. It is located at 42°32′23″N 77°37′41″W. As of the 2000 U.S. census, Perkinsville has an average household size of 2.66 persons.

From 1882 to 1963, Perkinsville was located on the New York (Hoboken) to Buffalo Main Line of the Delaware, Lackawanna & Western Railroad (1882–1960) and, subsequently, the Erie Lackawanna Railroad (1960–1963). Tracks were removed through Perkinsville in 1963 by order of the United States Interstate Commerce Commission, upon application by the EL, which had far easier grades on the former Erie mainline via Hornell. Since 1963, Perkinsville has had no rail service.
