= SS Europa (1928) =

German, later French ocean liner in service 1930-1962

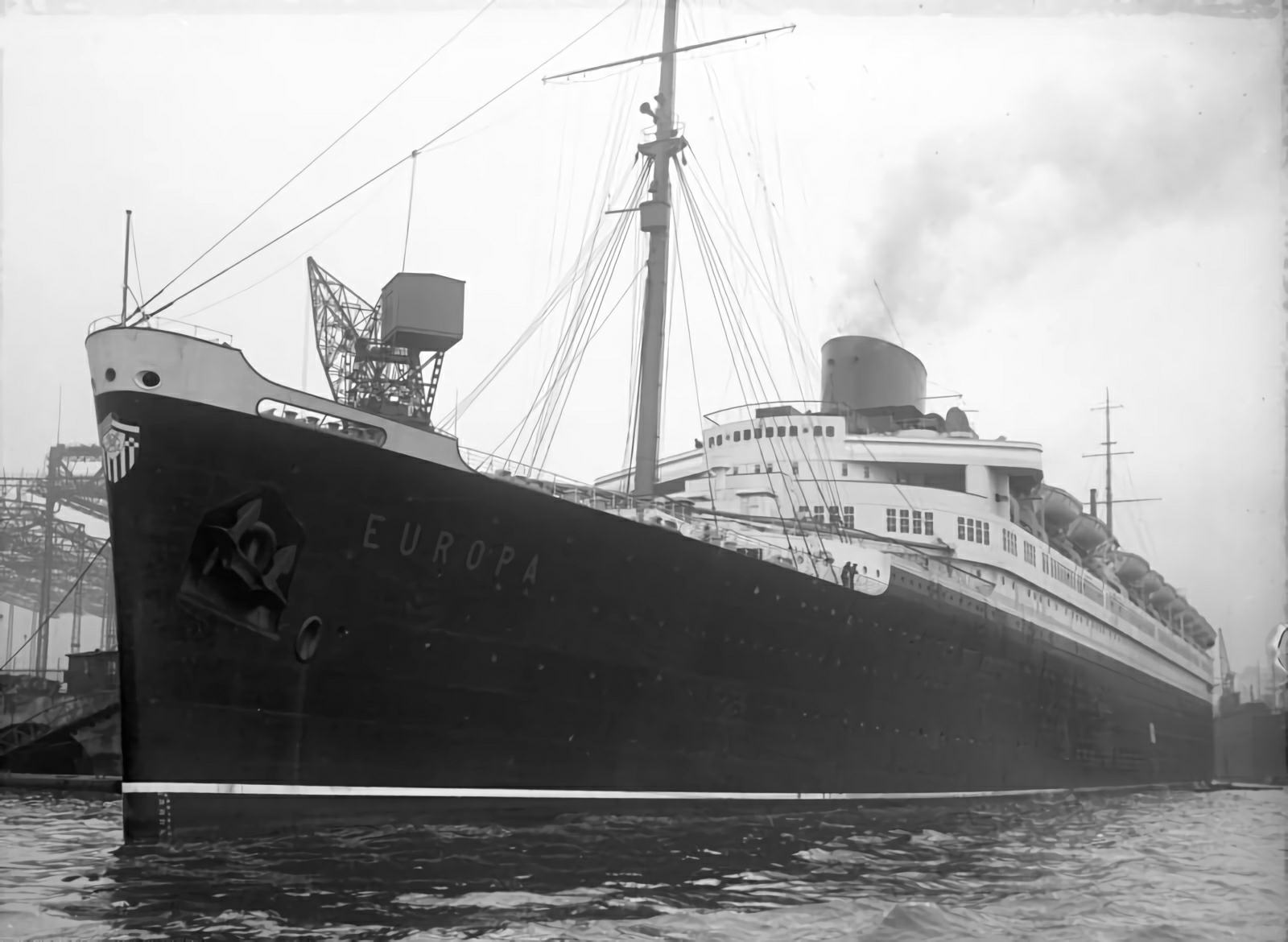
- SS Europa prior to her maiden voyage

History

Germany
- Name: Europa
- Owner: Norddeutscher Lloyd
- Port of registry: Bremen, Germany
- Route: Bremerhaven-Southampton-Cherbourg-New York
- Ordered: 1927
- Builder: Blohm & Voss shipyard, Hamburg, Germany
- Launched: 15 August 1928
- Christened: 15 August 1928
- Completed: 22 February 1930
- Maiden voyage: 19 March 1930
- In service: March 1930
- Out of service: May 1945
- Fate: Captured by Allied forces and claimed as war prize by the US Navy
- Notes: The second largest German ship built during the interwar period; Planned to be converted to German aircraft carrier I (1942) by the Kriegsmarine

United States
- Name: USS Europa
- Operator: United States Navy
- Port of registry: Boston, USA
- Route: Transatlantic
- Acquired: 1945
- In service: 1945 to 1946
- Out of service: 1946
- Identification: Pennant Number AP-177
- Fate: Turned over to the French Line in 1946
- Notes: Served as a Troop Transport from Brest, France to New York, USA

France
- Name: SS Liberté
- Operator: Compagnie Générale Transatlantique
- Route: Le Havre-Southampton-New York
- Acquired: 1946
- Maiden voyage: 16 July 1950
- In service: 1950 to 1962
- Out of service: 1946 to 1950, 1962
- Fate: Retired in 1962 and scrapped in 1963.

General characteristics
- Type: Ocean liner
- Tonnage: 49,746 GRT
- Displacement: 55,500 long tons (56,391 t)
- Length: 936.7 ft (283.5 m)
- Beam: 101.7 feet (31 m)
- Height: 150.6 feet
- Decks: 12
- Installed power: Four steam turbines generating 105,000 shp
- Propulsion: Quadruple propellers
- Speed: 27.5 knots (50.9 km/h; 31.6 mph)
- Capacity: 2,195 total passengers: 860 first class; 502 second class; 305 tourist class; 617 third class
- Crew: 965

SS Europa, later SS Liberté IMO 5607332, was an ocean liner built for the German shipping company Norddeutsche Lloyd (NDL) to work the transatlantic sea route. Launched in 1928, she and her sister ship, Bremen, were the two most advanced, high-speed steam turbine ocean vessels of their day, with both earning the Blue Riband.

After World War II, French line Compagnie Générale Transatlantique was awarded the Europa as a war prize to replace the destroyed SS Normandie, which had caught fire and capsized at her moorings while interned by the United States in New York City. Europa was refitted at Le Havre and rechristened the Liberté, serving until the arrival of the SS France in 1961 as the premier liner in the Compagnie's fleet. She was laid up in 1962 and scrapped at La Spezia, Italy, in 1963.

== History ==
=== Construction ===
Europa was built in 1928 with her sister ship SS Bremen to be the second 50,000–gross ton North German Lloyd liner. They both were powered with advanced high-speed steam turbine engines and were built with a bulbous bow entry and a low streamlined profile.

Europa and her slightly larger sister ship were designed to have a cruising speed of 27.5 knots, allowing an Atlantic crossing time of 5 days. This enabled Norddeutsche Lloyd to run regular weekly crossings with two ships, an operation that previously required three.

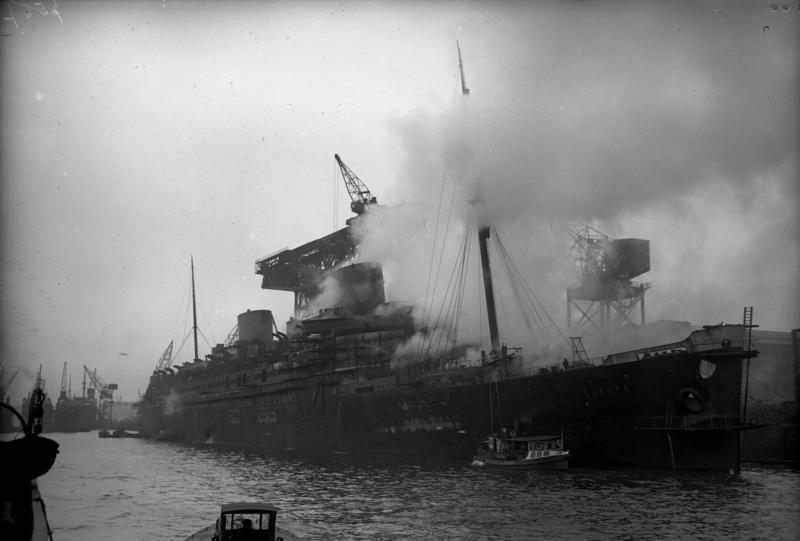
Europa burning and listing during her fitting out

The Europa was launched at Blohm & Voss shipyard, Hamburg on Wednesday, August 15, 1928. Bremen was launched the following day. Europa was intended to be completed in spring 1929. However, on the morning of 26 March 1929, a fire broke out while still at the equipment dock. The fire raged all day and was only brought under control in the evening. The ship's turbines were badly damaged in addition to significant damage to the rest of the ship's structure. After long discussions between builder and shipping company, it was decided to repair the ship. Within eleven months the ship was finished and completed on February 22, 1930. The cause of the fire has never been clearly identified.

=== Blue Riband ===
Europa made her maiden voyage to New York on 19 March 1930 taking the westbound Blue Riband from SS Bremen with the average speed of 27.91 knots and a crossing time of 4 days, 17 hours and 6 minutes. During the voyage many of her passengers were disturbed by the soot coming out of Europa's low funnels. The problem was corrected by raising the funnels by 15 feet, though decreasing her low profile. After they were raised, there were no more complaints. She held the Riband until Bremen recaptured it in June 1933.

=== Aircraft ===
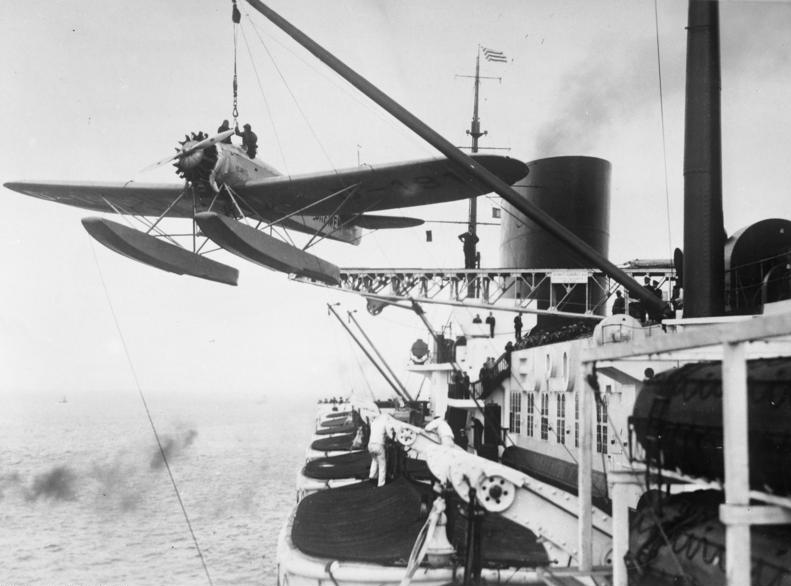
Heinkel He 58 D-1919 Bremen Atlantic being loaded onto the catapult on SS Europa

Like Bremen, Europa had a small seaplane launched from a catapult on her upper deck between the funnels. The airplane flew from the ship to a landing at the seaplane port in Blexen.

The catapult was removed from both Bremen and Europa after a few years of service.

=== World War II ===
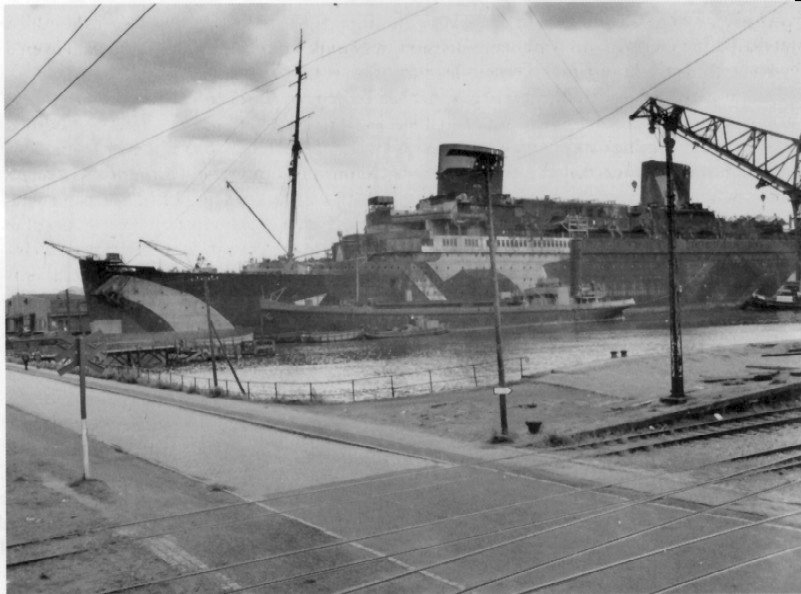
USS Europa in dazzle camouflage in Bremerhaven, May 1945

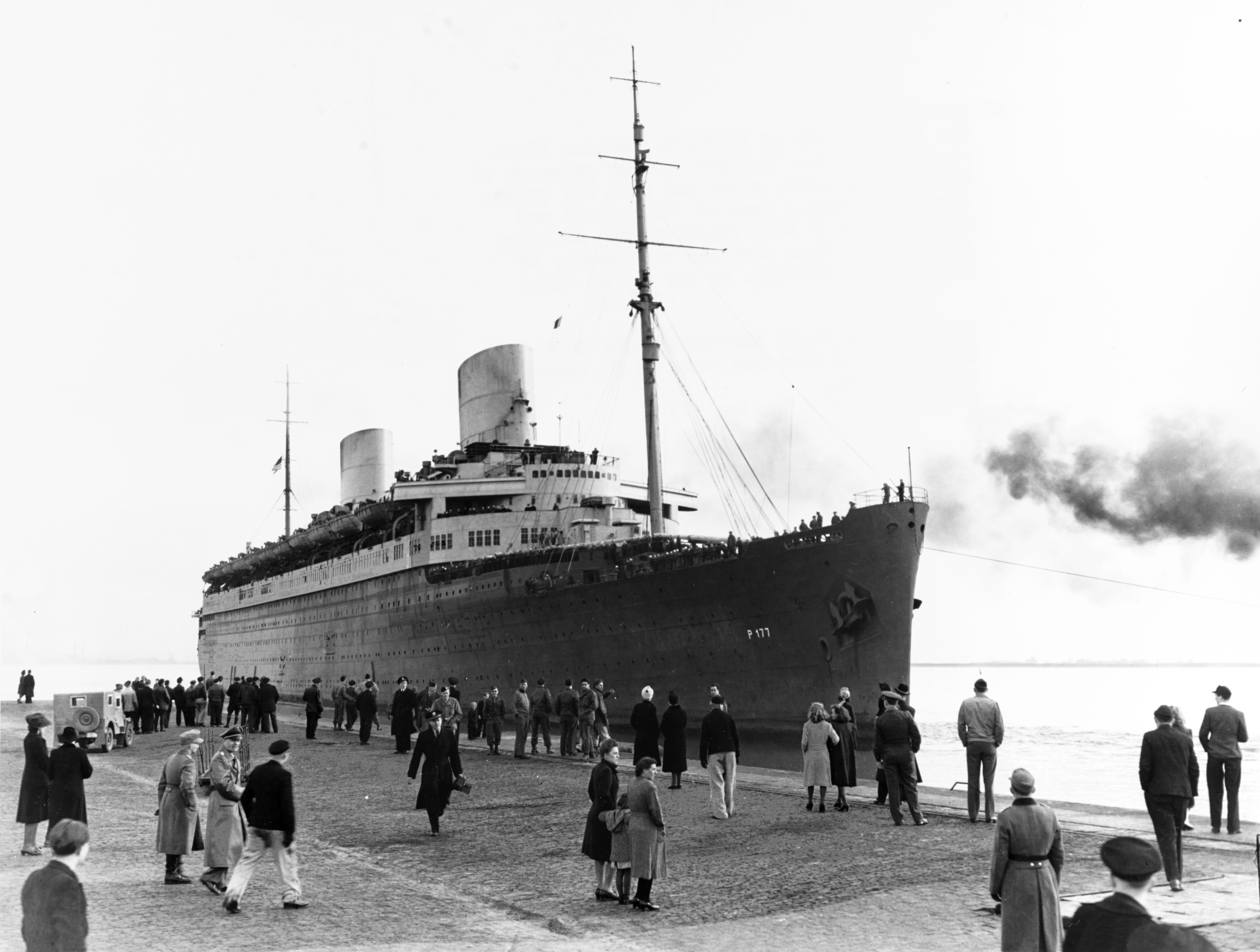
USS Europa arriving in Bremerhaven, 24 March 1946

Europa was inactive for most of World War II. There were plans to use her as a transport in Operation Sea Lion, the intended invasion of Great Britain, and later conversion to an aircraft carrier. None of these plans came to pass, and in 1945, she was captured by the Allies and used as a troopship, sailing as the USS Europa (AP-177). The United States claimed the ship as a war prize on 8 May 1945 and gave the vessel to the US Navy, which commissioned Europa 25 August 1945. Europa cleared Bremerhaven on 11 September 1945 for Southampton, England, where she loaded 4,500 homeward-bound American troops, arriving in New York City on 24 September. After alteration to increase her troop-carrying capacity, she made two voyages to Southampton to bring US servicemen home to the United States. She sailed from New York once more, on 15 March 1946, bound for Kirkwall in the Orkney Islands, and Bremerhaven, where she moored on 24 March.

Europa suffered from small fires caused by the removal of the ship's original high-quality fittings and installation of inferior replacements to compensate for material shortages in the war effort. Also, several serious hull cracks were discovered. The vessel was decommissioned on 2 May 1946 and delivered to the State Department on 8 June 1946. She was later transferred to France in partial payment of war reparations.

=== French Line ===
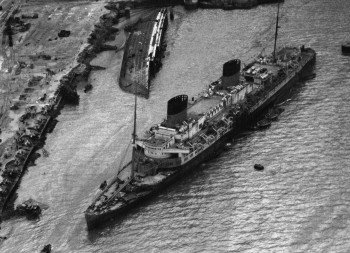
Europa sunk following a collision with the capsized SS Paris at Le Havre

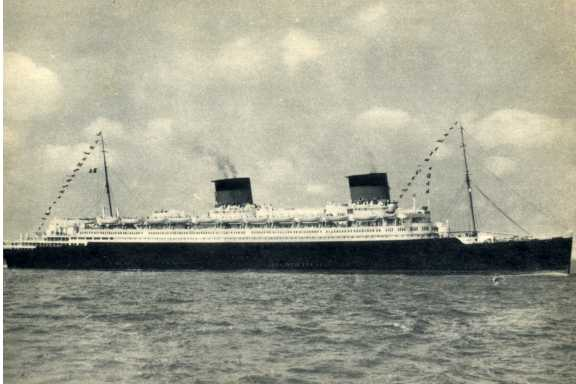
Sailing as SS Liberté in the 1950s

After World War II French line Compagnie Générale Transatlantique was awarded Europa as a war prize to replace the destroyed SS Normandie, which had caught fire and capsized at her moorings while interned by the United States in New York City. Europa was taken to Le Havre for refitting – which proved fraught with difficulties. On December 8, 1946, a storm caused her to break free from her moorings and she collided with the wreck of Paris, causing significant damage to her hull. She was raised in April 1947 and towed to the Ateliers et Chantiers de Saint-Nazaire Penhoët shipyard in Saint-Nazaire to complete her refitting. She suffered some further damage when the ship caught fire once again in October 1949, resulting in damage to some of her passenger space. Finally, on August 2, 1950, wearing CGT black-topped red funnels in place of NDL yellow, she made her maiden voyage to New York under her new name, Liberté. After five years and two near disasters the crossing was uneventful. Sailing the Le Havre – New York route, and she went on to serve as the premier transatlantic liner in the French Line fleet until the arrival of the 66,000-ton SS France in 1961. Liberté was laid up in 1962 and scrapped at La Spezia, Italy, in 1963.

Liberté was featured prominently in the Jane Russell film The French Line. Liberté made an appearance in the opening credits of the 1953 film How to Marry a Millionaire, as well as the 1954 classic film Sabrina, starring Audrey Hepburn and Humphrey Bogart, in the final scenes of the film.

== Fate ==
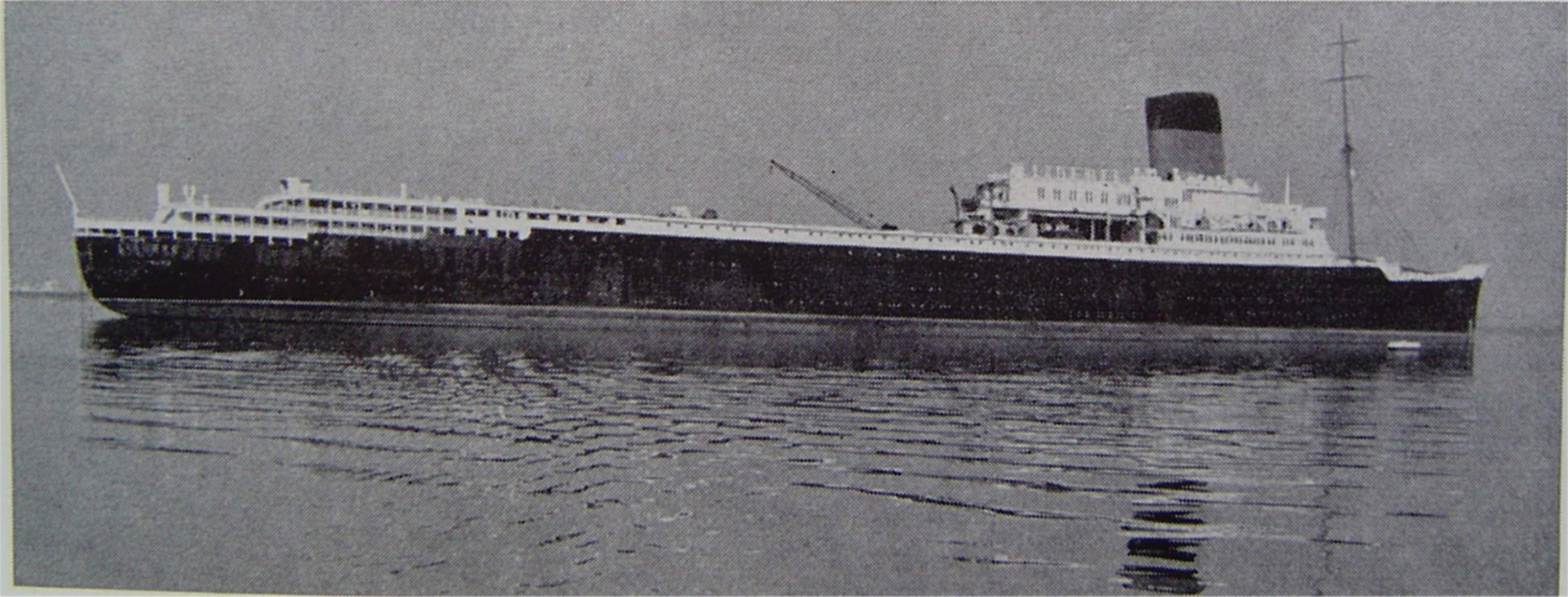
Liberté being scrapped in La Spezia, 1964

Liberté was scrapped in La Spezia, Italy, in 1964.

Records
Preceded by Bremen	Holder of the Blue Riband (Westbound); 1930 – 1933	Succeeded by Rex
