= Bulbous bow =

Protruding bulb at the front of a ship

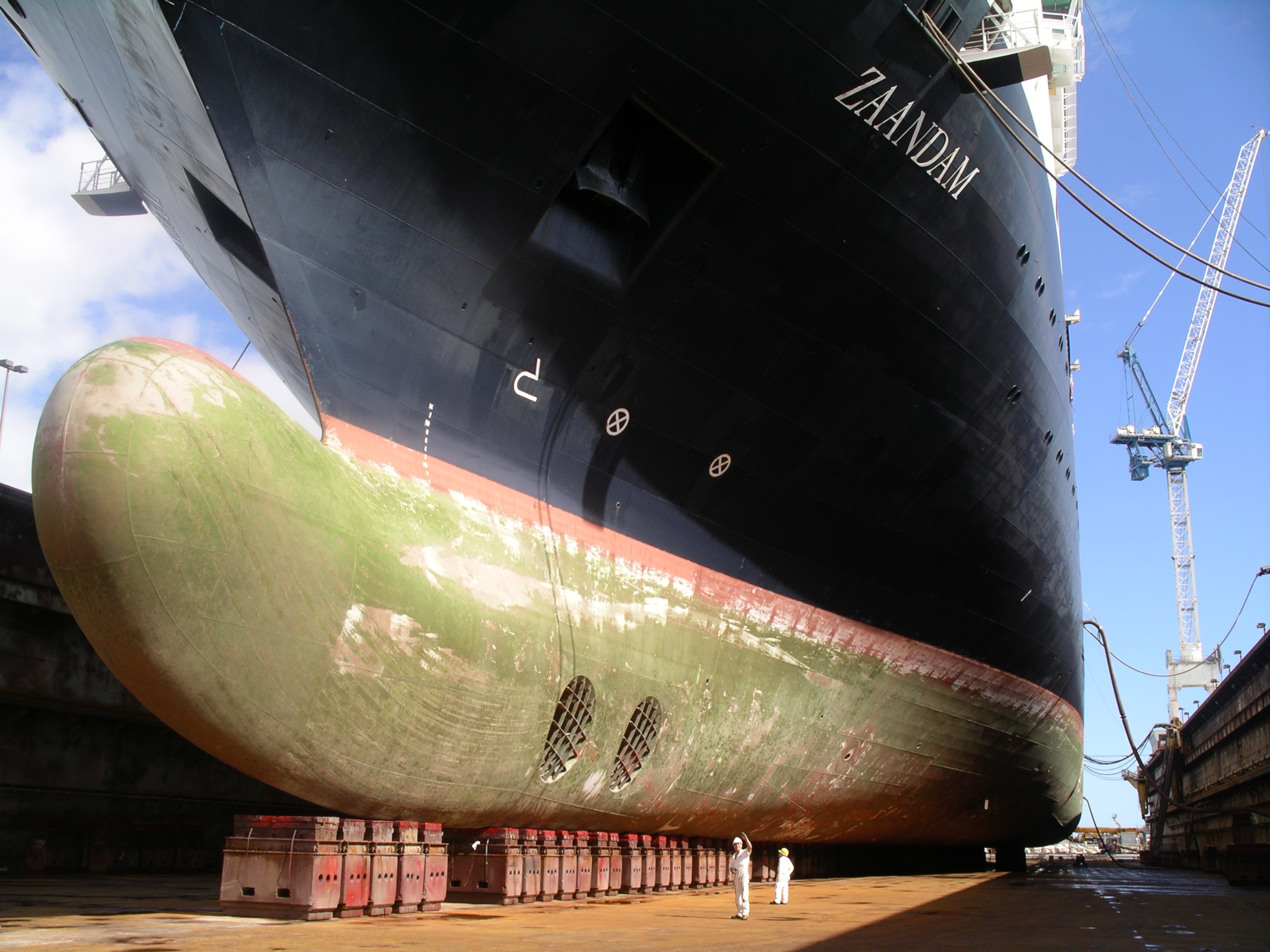
A "ram" bulbous bow curves upwards from the bottom, and has a "knuckle" if the top is higher than the juncture with the hull—the through-tunnels in the side are bow thrusters.

A bulbous bow is a streamlined flaring or protruding bulb at the bow (or front) of a ship just below the waterline. The flare or bulb modifies the way the water flows around the hull, reducing drag and thus increasing speed, range, fuel efficiency, and stability. Large ships with bulbous bows generally have twelve to fifteen percent better fuel efficiency than similar vessels without them. A bulbous bow also increases the buoyancy of the forward part and hence reduces the pitching of the ship to a small degree.

Vessels with high kinetic energy, which is proportional to mass and the square of the velocity, benefit from having a bulbous bow that is designed for their operating speed; this includes vessels with high mass (e.g. supertankers) or a high service speed (e.g. passenger ships, and cargo ships). Vessels of lower mass (less than 4,000 dwt) and those that operate at slower speeds (less than 12 kts) have a reduced benefit from bulbous bows, because of the eddies that occur in those cases; examples include tugboats, powerboats, sailing vessels, and small yachts.

Bulbous bows have been found to be most effective when used on vessels that meet the following conditions:

- The waterline length is longer than about 15 metres (49 ft).
- The bulb design is optimised for the vessel's operating speed.

== Underlying principle ==
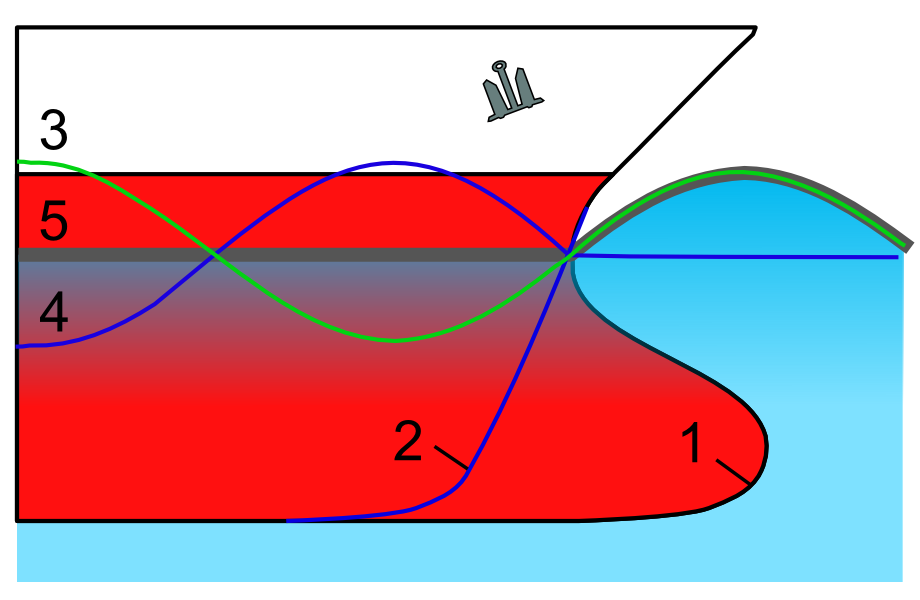
The combined influence of a subsurface bulb and a conventional bow on wave formation where the wave created by the bulb cancels that created by the conventional bow: 1. Profile of bow with bulb; 2. Profile of bow without bulb; 3. Wave created by bulb; 4. Wave created by conventional bow; 5. Waterline and region of cancelled waves

The effect of the bulbous bow can be explained using the concept of destructive interference of waves:

A conventionally shaped bow causes a bow wave. A bulb alone forces the water to flow up and over it forming a trough. Thus, if a bulb is added to a conventional bow at the proper position, the bulb trough coincides with the crest of the bow wave, and the two cancel out, reducing the vessel's wake. While inducing another wave stream saps energy from the ship, cancelling out the second wave stream at the bow changes the pressure distribution along the hull, thereby reducing wave resistance. The effect that pressure distribution has on a surface is known as the form effect.

A sharp bow on a conventional hull form would produce waves and low drag like a bulbous bow, but waves coming from the side would strike it harder. The blunt bulbous bow also produces higher pressure in a large region in front, making the bow wave start earlier.

The addition of a bulb to a ship's hull increases its overall wetted area. As wetted area increases, so does drag. At greater speeds and in larger vessels it is the bow wave that is the greatest force impeding the vessel's forward motion through the water. For a vessel that is small or spends a great deal of its time at a slow speed, the increase in drag will not be offset by the benefit in damping bow wave generation. As the wave counter effects are only significant at the vessel's higher range of speed, bulbous bows are not energy efficient when the vessel cruises outside of these ranges, specifically at lower speeds.

Bulbous bows may be configured differently, according to the designed interaction between the bow wave and the countering wave from the bulb. Design parameters include:

- a) upward curvature (a "ram" bulb) versus straight forward (a "faired-in" bulb),
- b) bulb position with respect to the waterline, and
- c) bulb volume.

Bulbous bows also decrease a ship's pitching motion, when they are ballasted, by increasing the mass at a distance removed from the ship's longitudinal centre of gravity.

== Development ==
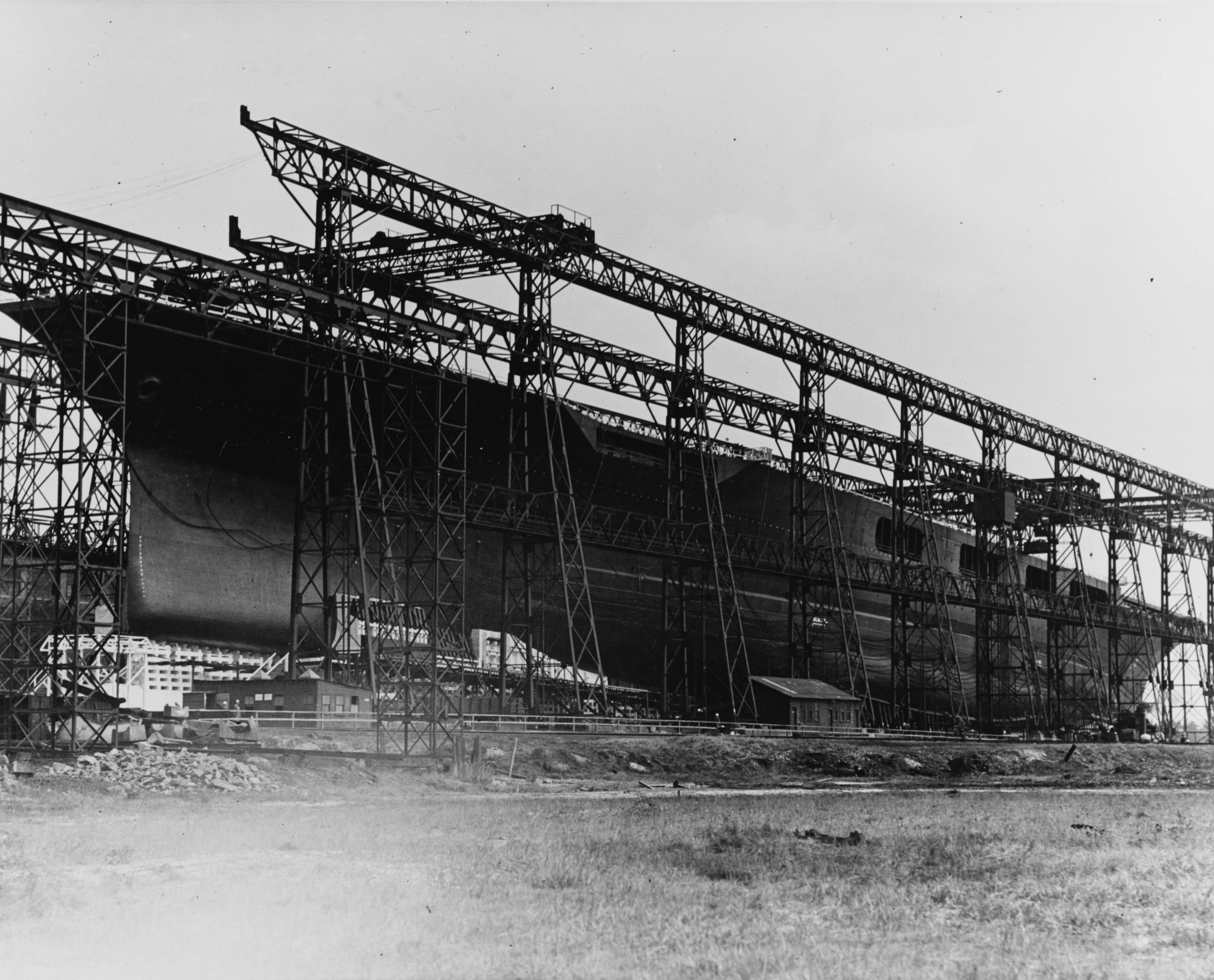
The flaring bulbous bow of the USS Lexington is visible on the left, while the vessel was under construction in 1925.

Before 1900, towing tests of warships had demonstrated that a below-water ram shape reduced resistance through the water. The bulbous bow concept is credited to David W. Taylor, a naval architect who served as Chief Constructor of the United States Navy during the First World War and who used the concept (known as a bulbous forefoot) in his design of the USS Delaware, which entered service in 1910. The bow design did not initially enjoy wide acceptance, although it was used in the Lexington-class battlecruiser to great success after the two ships of that class which survived the Washington Naval Treaty were converted to aircraft carriers. This lack of acceptance changed in the 1920s, with Germany's launching of Bremen and Europa. They were referred to as Germany's North Atlantic greyhounds, two large commercial ocean liners that competed for the trans-Atlantic passenger trade. Both ships won the coveted Blue Riband, Bremen in 1929 with a crossing speed of 27.9 knots (51.7 km/h; 32.1 mph), and Europa surpassing her in 1930 with a crossing speed of 27.91 knots.

The design began to be incorporated elsewhere, as seen in the U.S. built SS Malolo, SS President Hoover and SS President Coolidge passenger liners launched in the late 1920s and early 1930s. Still, the idea was viewed as experimental by many shipbuilders and owners.

In 1935 the French superliner Normandie was designed by Vladimir Yurkevich combining a bulbous forefoot with massive size and a redesigned hull shape. She was able to achieve speeds in excess of 30 knots (56 km/h). Normandie was famous for many things, including her clean entry into the water and markedly reduced bow wave. Normandie's great rival, the British liner Queen Mary, achieved equivalent speeds using traditional stem and hull design. However, a crucial difference was that Normandie achieved these speeds with approximately thirty per cent less engine power than Queen Mary and a corresponding reduction in fuel use.

Bulbous bow designs were also developed and used by the Imperial Japanese Navy. A modest bulbous bow was used in a number of their ship designs, including the light cruiser Ōyodo and the carriers Shōkaku and Taihō. A far more radical bulbous bow design solution was incorporated into their massively large Yamato-class battleships, including Yamato, Musashi and the aircraft carrier Shinano.

=== Modern bulbous bow ===
The modern bulbous bow was developed by Dr. Takao Inui at the University of Tokyo during the 1950s and 1960s, independently of Japanese naval research. Inui based his research on earlier findings by scientists made after Taylor discovered that ships fitted with a bulbous forefoot exhibited substantially lower drag characteristics than predicted. The bulbous bow concept was first definitively studied by Thomas Havelock, Cyril Wigley and Georg Weinblum, including Wigley's 1936 work "The Theory of the Bulbous Bow and its Practical Application" which examined the issues of wave production and damping. Inui's initial scientific papers on the effect of bulbous bow on wave-making resistance were collected into a report published by the University of Michigan in 1960. His work came to widespread attention with his paper "Wavemaking Resistance of Ships" published by the Society of Naval Architects and Marine Engineers in 1962. It was eventually found that drag could be reduced by about five per cent. Experimentation and refinement slowly improved the geometry of bulbous bows, but they were not widely exploited until computer modelling techniques enabled researchers at the University of British Columbia to increase their performance to a practical level in the 1980s.

== Design considerations ==
Bulbous bows embody the following defining characteristics:

- Length-wise shape
- Cross-section
- Length of forward projection
- Position of the shape's axis (e.g. forward or upwards)

While the primary purpose of such bulbs is to reduce the power required to drive a vessel at its operating speed, their sea-keeping characteristics are also important. A ship's wave-making characteristics at its operating speed are reflected in its Froude number. (Note: In marine hydrodynamic applications, the Froude number is usually referenced with the notation Fn and is defined as: $$\mathrm{Fn}_L = \frac{u}{\sqrt{gL}}$$ where u is the relative flow velocity between the sea and ship, g is in particular the acceleration due to gravity, and L is the length of the ship at the water line level, or L_{wl} in some notations. It is an important parameter with respect to the ship's drag, or resistance, especially in terms of wave making resistance.) A ship designer can compare the length at the water line for a design with and without a bulb necessary to power the vessel at its operating speed. The higher the speed, the bigger the benefit of the bulbous bow in diminishing the necessity for a longer water line to achieve the same power requirement. Bulbs typically are v-shaped on the bottom to minimise slamming in rough seas.

== See also ==
- Axe bow § LEADGE-bow
