= Vladimir Yourkevitch =

Russian naval engineer

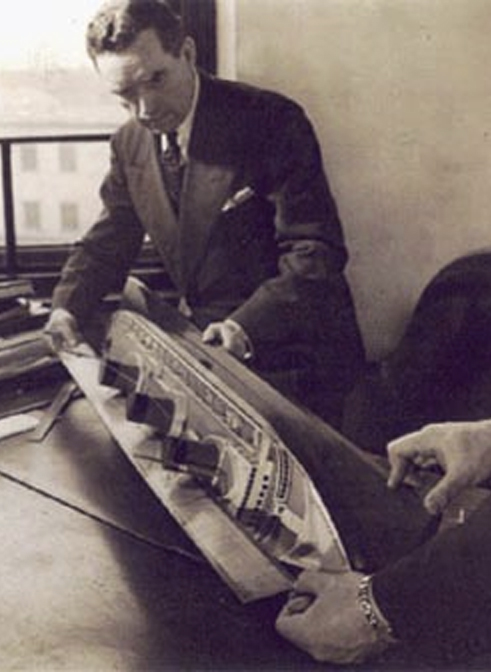
Vladimir Yourkevitch working on design of SS Normandie

Vladimir Yourkevitch (Russian: Владимир Иванович Юркевич, also spelled Yourkevitch, 1885 in Moscow – December 13, 1964) was a Russian naval engineer, and a designer of the Ocean Liner SS Normandie. He worked in Russia, France, and the United States.

== Years in Russia ==
Vladimir Yourkevitch attended Saint Petersburg Polytechnic Institute from 1903 to 1907, where he was a pupil of naval engineer Alexei Krylov. After graduation, he entered Kronstadt Naval School. One year later, he received a degree as a shipbuilding engineer and was promoted to the rank of second lieutenant.

He was assigned to work in the design bureau of the Baltic Shipyard. After Russia’s defeat in the Russo-Japanese War and the loss of the navy in the Battle of Tsushima, the Naval Staff Headquarters was set up in Russia, which worked out a program for the modernization of the Russian navy.

Yourkevitch was entrusted to work on the largest and fastest cruisers that existed at that time in the Russian Navy. According to experts, the first Russian dreadnought Sevastopol, which was launched in 1911, "was many years ahead of the world in shipbuilding." Yourkevitch's famous "streamlined form" was realized for the first time in its construction.

In 1915, Yourkevitch was transferred to the Sailing Department of the Baltic Shipyard. He was the designated designer of the Forel and Ersh submarines. He took part in the design process and testing of 11 submarines of the AG type. He was also one of the main designers of four super-dreadnought battlecruisers: Borodino, Kinbourn, Izmail and Navarin. The new shape of their hulls provided excellent results on the tests of the models, but the warships were not built because of the October Revolution.

During the Russian Civil War, Yourkevitch became an officer with the White Movement. In 1920, after the defeat of Wrangel's army in Crimea, he emigrated to Turkey. He experienced hardships living in a foreign country, including the inability of working at his profession, instead finding employment as a stevedore. Afterwards, with a group of fellow immigrants, he set up a repair shop for older cars. Two years later, he relocated to Paris.

== Involvement with ocean liners ==
Yourkevitch was obliged to accept work as a turner at the Renault car factory and as a draughtsman at a shipyard. He attempted to convince British shipbuilders to use the hull design he had developed in Russia for the project of RMS Queen Mary, claiming it would be equivalent to a power boost of 1/6, but his idea was rejected.

Six years later, he seized the opportunity to work based on his qualifications. He was employed by the shipbuilding company Penhoët, which soon afterward was commissioned to design and construct a massive new transatlantic liner called the SS Normandie. Yourkevitch designed the body plan of the ship independently, which played a very significant role in his future life.

Work on the project started in 1929. Yourkevitch believed he had to work until late at night to achieve his goals. "He created his work in primitive, refugee-style surroundings, where the drawing board was the most sacred object. On the walls, on the floor and on the desks there were volumes of correspondence, tables, diagrams…" said one of Yourkevitch's friends.

After more than five years of labor, calculations and checking, the project was adopted. "I had to sustain a long fight: the forms I suggested were so different from the ones that were generally accepted, that I had to argue in their favour to the end. It cost me a lot of emotions," Yourkevitch later confessed.

The testing, which started first in Paris and then continued in Hamburg, proved the superiority of Yourkevitch's model. It was the fastest of 25 models that had been proposed, mainly by French specialists. Many were struck by the novelty of its hull, which combined a bulbous bow with the Clipper-style of the top of the hull.

With France initially unaffected by the Great Depression, Compagnie Générale Transatlantique ("CGT" or "The French Line") started the construction of what would become the Normandie in 1931, and she was launched in 1932. But as the Depression reduced demand for transatlantic travel, CGT slowed her fitting-out, and she did not enter service for two and a half years. On her maiden voyage in May 1935 from Le Havre to New York City, she crossed from the Bishop Rock to Ambrose Light in four days, three hours, and five minutes at an average speed of almost 30 knots, bettering the previous record by over a knot, and earning Normandie the Blue Riband for the fastest crossing. She later lost it to RMS Queen Mary, and then took it back before losing it for good. But the revolutionary design of Normandie's hull allowed her, with 160,000 horsepower engines, to be almost as fast as Queen Mary, a ship virtually the same size but with 212,000 horsepower engines. Normandie also required much less fuel than Queen Mary.

Yourkevitch moved to America on 5 March 1937. He founded a technical bureau in New York called Yourkevitch Ship Designs, Inc. and started negotiating with representatives of the naval and commercial fleets of the US, as well as with private shipping companies. A. N. Vlasov, also a graduate from the Polytechnic Institute and the owner of over forty ocean liners, rendered Yourkevitch financial assistance and addressed their fellows with the following appeal: "We, Russian-Americans, are very proud of the success of our talented compatriot and consider it our sacred duty to support his new enterprise in America… We view the cause of V. I. Yourkevitch as the National Cause of Russia."

The first testing of Yourkevitch's models took place in Washington, D.C., in the government testing basin. Their results exceeded those of models designed by competitors. By 1938, 42 ships had been built or reconstructed according to Yourkevitch's designs.

From 1939 to 1945, Yourkevitch continued his scientific and educational studies. A number of his articles were dedicated to the problems of upgrading the form of the hull, to the ship's steadiness and speed, and to the ocean liners of the future. He gave lectures on the theory of ship design at the University of Michigan and in the Shipbuilding Department of the Massachusetts Institute of Technology. In 1940, Yourkevitch started working as a technical consultant for the U.S. Maritime Administration and contributed to the design of US warships during World War II.

Yourkevitch was in New York City on 9 February 1942 when Normandie, which had been requisitioned by the US Navy and renamed Lafayette, caught fire during conversion works, and subsequently capsized due to taking on too much extinguishing water. He could have saved the ship, based on his intimate knowledge of the liner's ballast systems, but the NYC Fire Department would not call on him. The situation was complicated by the fact that the ship's advanced fire suppression systems had been offline and un-staffed at the time. The United States Navy would later partner with him during what was then the largest and most complicated salvage operation on a passenger liner until the advent of the Costa Concordia incident of 2013. Even after the ship was but a blistered hull, with most of her superstructure gone, he strongly believed she was salvageable. President Franklin D. Roosevelt and others in the War Department felt the same way, but further inspections of her innovative hull nevertheless uncovered damages and other issues in the ship and made her, according to experts, beyond economical repair. The idea of having the former ocean liner rebuilt as an aircraft carrier was also shelved. The Normandie's eventual scrapping in 1946 was said to have been heartbreaking to Yourkevitch.

== Later life ==
In the post-war years of 1954–1957, Yourkevitch worked on a project of a giant ship that would carry six thousand passengers from New York to Le Havre within three days for 50 dollars. Two ships of this class were supposed to service the line between the United States and Germany. For several years the American press made a fuss over the sensational project, but it was never realised. To a significant degree, the realisation was hampered by the financial difficulties of the customer, and also by the shipping and airline companies that were afraid of losing passengers and profits.

Almost to the end of his days he worked as a consultant for big shipbuilding companies in England, Canada, and the US. Yourkevitch died in December 1964. He was buried at the Russian Orthodox cemetery at the Novo-Diveevo Convent in Nanuet, New York.

== See also ==
- List of Russian inventors
