= SS Normandie =

Ocean liner

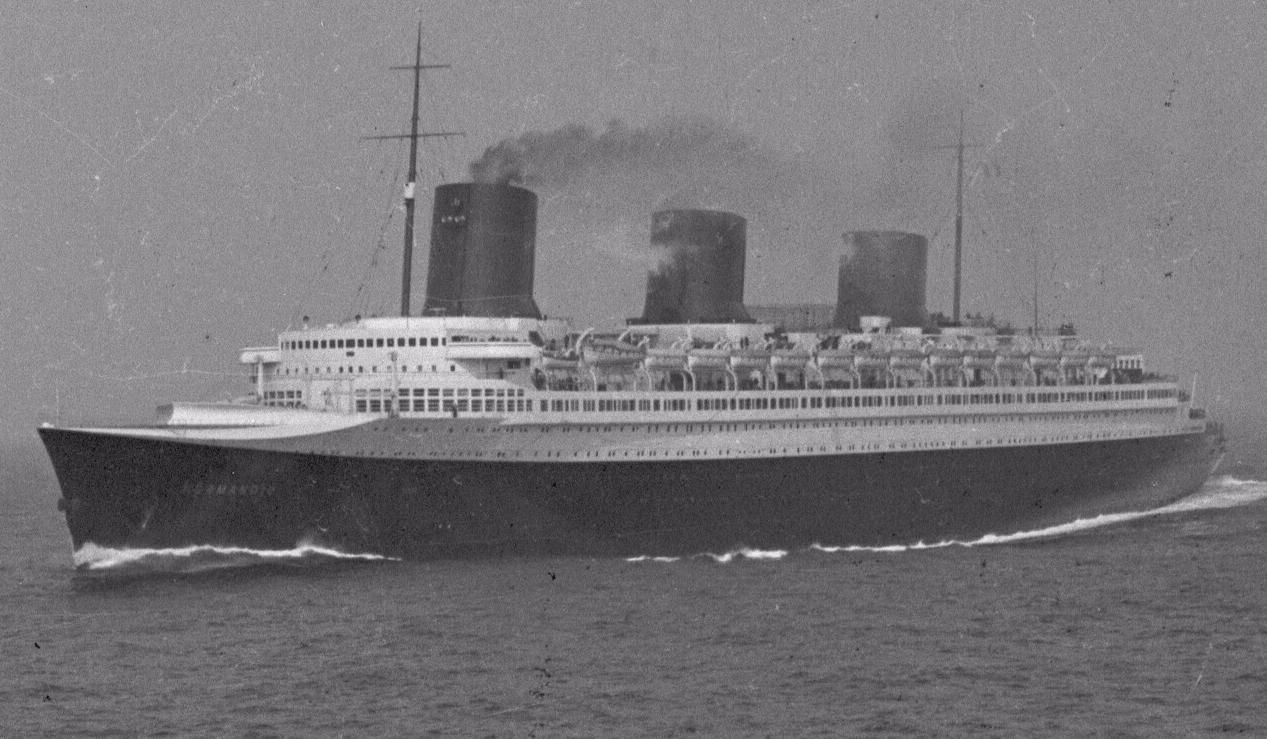
- Normandie at sea c. 1935–1936

History

France
- Name: Normandie
- Namesake: Normandy
- Owner: Compagnie Générale Transatlantique
- Port of registry: Port of Le Havre
- Route: Le Havre-Southampton-New York
- Builder: Chantiers de Penhoet, Saint-Nazaire, France
- Yard number: T6
- Laid down: 26 January 1931
- Launched: 29 October 1932
- Christened: 29 October 1932
- Completed: 1933
- Maiden voyage: 29 May 1935
- In service: 1935–1942
- Out of service: 1942
- Identification: Call sign FNSK
- Fate: Caught fire, capsized February 1942. Scrapped October 1946.

General characteristics
- Type: Ocean liner
- Tonnage: 79,280 GRT (1935–1936); 83,423 GRT (1936-1942)
- Displacement: 68,350 tons (loaded)
- Length: 313.6 m (1,029 ft) o/a; 293.2 m (962 ft) p/p
- Beam: 35.9 m (117 ft 10 in);
- Height: 56.1 m (184 ft)
- Draught: 11.2 m (36 ft 7 in) (loaded)
- Depth: 28.0 m (92 ft) to promenade (strength) deck
- Decks: 12
- Installed power: Four Alsthom steam turbines driving alternators powering electric motors, total 120 MW (160,000 hp); 150 MW (200,000 hp) max
- Propulsion: Four 3 bladed propellers on launch – later 4 bladed
- Speed: 29.5 kn (54.6 km/h; 33.9 mph) designed; 32.2 kn (59.6 km/h; 37.1 mph) recorded on trials
- Capacity: 1,972: 848 First Class (cabin), 670 Tourist Class, 454 Third Class
- Crew: 1,345

SS Normandie was a French ocean liner built in Saint-Nazaire, France, for the French Line Compagnie Générale Transatlantique (CGT). She entered service in 1935 as the largest and fastest passenger ship afloat, crossing the Atlantic in a record 4.14 days, and remains the most powerful steam turbo-electric-propelled passenger ship ever built.

During service as the flagship of the CGT, she made 139 westbound transatlantic crossings from her home port of Le Havre to New York City. Normandie held the Blue Riband for the fastest transatlantic crossing at several points during her service career, during which RMS Queen Mary was her main rival.

During the Second World War, Normandie was seized by U.S. authorities at New York and renamed USS Lafayette. In 1942, while being converted to a troopship, the liner caught fire and capsized onto her port side and came to rest, half submerged, on the bottom of the Hudson River at Pier 88 (the site of the current Manhattan Cruise Terminal). Although salvaged at great expense, restoration was deemed too costly and she was scrapped in October 1946.

== Origins ==
The origins of Normandie can be traced to the 1920s, when the U.S. put restrictions on immigration, greatly reducing the traditional market for steerage-class passengers from Europe, and placing a new emphasis on upper-class tourists, largely Americans, many of them wanting to escape prohibition. Companies like Cunard and the White Star Line planned to build their own superliners to rival newer ships of the day; such vessels included the record-breaking Bremen and Europa, both German. The French Line Compagnie Générale Transatlantique (CGT) began to plan its own superliner.

Adolphe Cassandre's famed 1935 depiction of the Normandie

The CGT's flagship was the Ile de France, which had modern Art Deco interiors but a conservative hull design. The designers intended their new superliner to be similar to earlier French Line ships. Then they were approached by Vladimir Yourkevitch, a former ship architect for the Imperial Russian Navy who had emigrated to France after the 1917 revolution. Yourkevitch's ideas included a slanting clipper-like bow and a bulbous forefoot beneath the waterline, in combination with a slim hydrodynamic hull. His concepts worked wonderfully in scale models, confirming the design's performance advantages. The French engineers were convinced by Yourkevitch and asked him to join their project. He also approached Cunard with his ideas, but was rejected because the bow was deemed too radical.

The CGT commissioned artists to create posters and publicity for the liner. One of the most famous posters was by Adolphe Mouron Cassandre, another Russian emigrant to France. Another poster, by Albert Sébille, showed the interior layout in a cutaway diagram 4.5 metres (15 ft) long. This poster is displayed in the Musée national de la Marine in Paris.

== Construction and launch ==
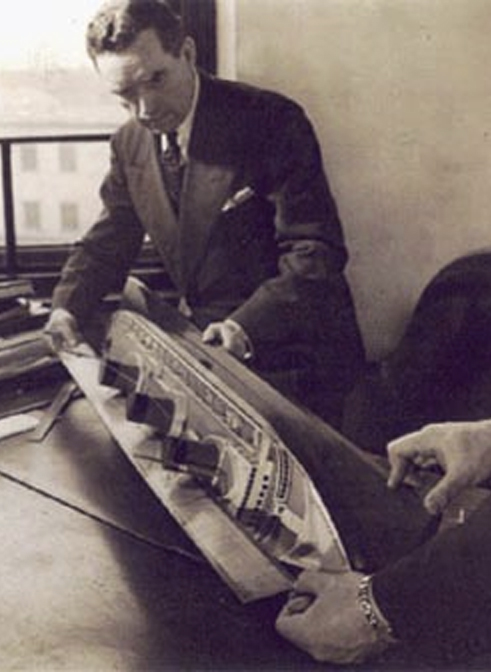
Vladimir Yourkevitch working on design of the Normandie

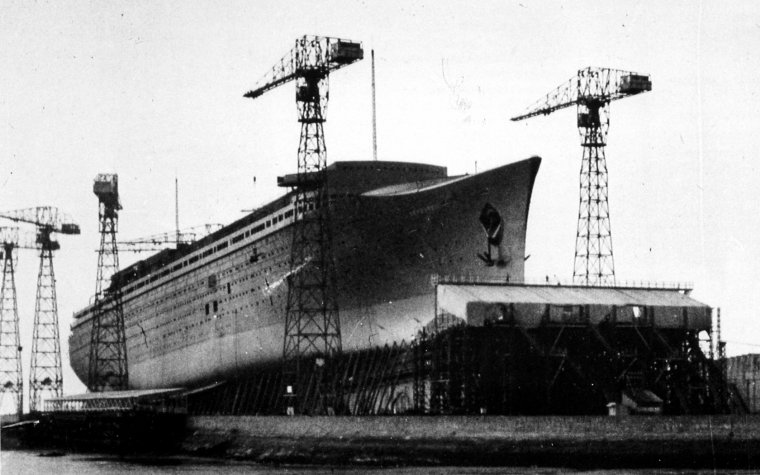
Normandie under construction, 1932

Work by the Société Anonyme des Chantiers de Penhoët began on the unnamed flagship on 26 January 1931 at Saint-Nazaire, not long after the stock market crash of 1929. While the French continued construction, the competing White Star Line's planned Oceanic was cancelled and Cunard's RMS Queen Mary put on hold. French builders also ran into difficulty and had to ask for government money; this subsidy was questioned in the press. Still, the ship's construction was followed by newspapers and national interest was deep, as she was designed to represent France in the nation-state contest of the great liners and was built in a French shipyard using French parts.

The growing hull in Saint-Nazaire had no formal designation except "T-6" ("T" for "Transat", an alternate name for the French Line, and "6" for "6th"), the contract name. Many names were suggested including Doumer, after Paul Doumer, the recently assassinated President of France; and originally, La Belle France. Finally Normandie was chosen, a name last used by CGT for a financially successful ocean liner in service from May 1883 until October 1911. In France, boat prefixes properly depend on the boat name's gender, but non-sailors mostly use the masculine form, inherited from the French terms for boat, which can be "paquebot", "navire", "bateau", or "bâtiment". British and Germans refer to boats as feminine ("she's a beauty"). The CGT called their ship simply "Normandie", preceded by neither "le" nor "la" (French masculine/feminine for "the") to avoid any confusion.

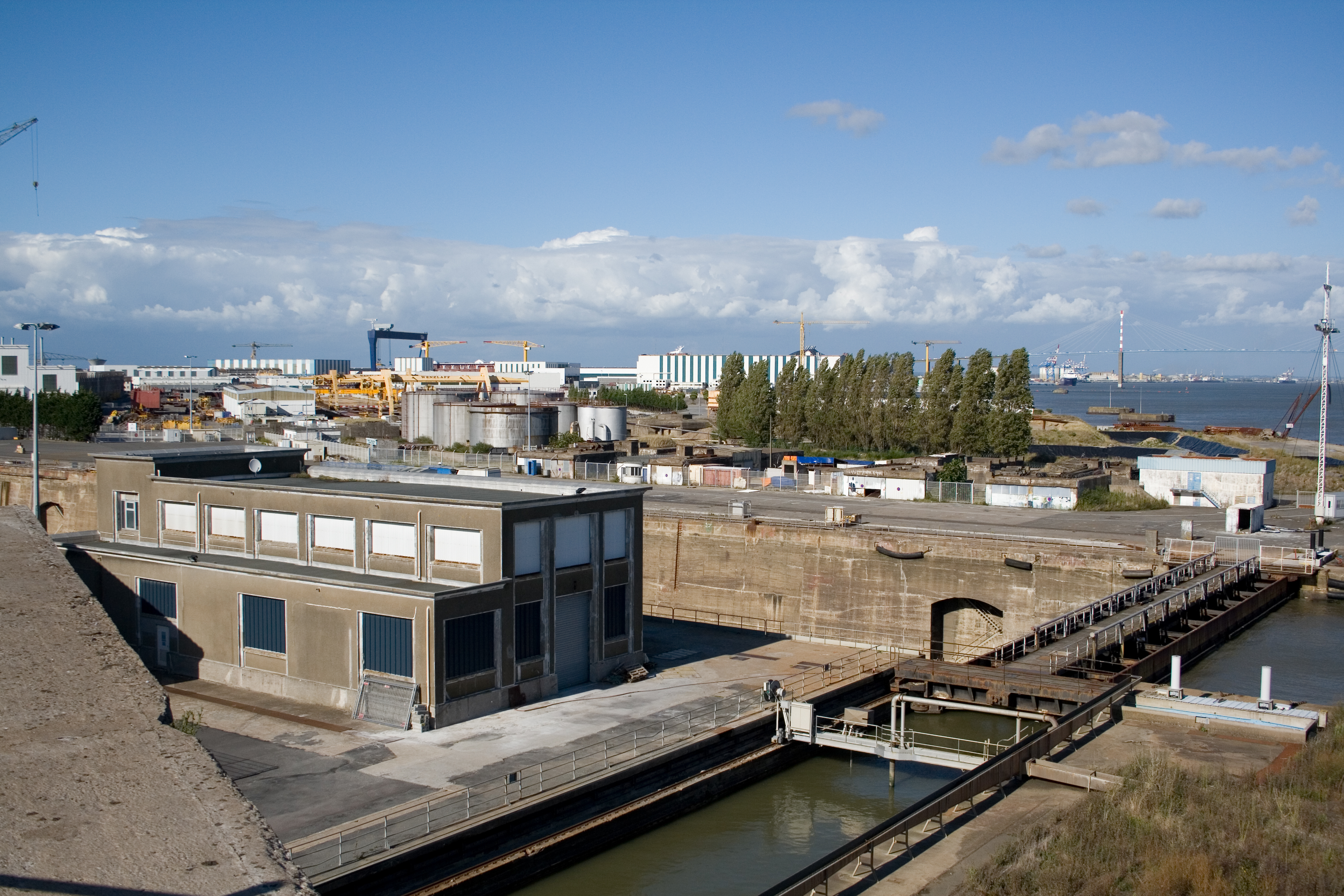
The Normandie drydock in St. Nazaire which was built specifically for the new ship

On 29 October 1932 – three years to the day after the stock market crash – Normandie was launched in front of two hundred thousand spectators. The 27,567-ton hull that slid into the river Loire was the largest launched and the wave washed up the shoreline and over several hundred spectators, but with no injury. She was dedicated by Madame Marguerite Lebrun, wife of Albert Lebrun, the president of France. The ship was outfitted until early 1935, her interiors, funnels, engines, and other fittings put in to make her into a working vessel. Finally, in May 1935, Normandie was ready for trials, which were watched by reporters. The hydrodynamic qualities of Yourkevitch's hull resulted in very little bow wave. The ship reached a top speed of 32.125 kn (59.5 km/h) and used her ability to dedicate all engines to full reverse to perform an emergency stop from that speed in 1,700 m (5,600 ft).

In addition to a hull design which let her attain speed at far less power than other big liners, Normandie had a turbo-electric transmission, with turbo-generators and electric propulsion motors built by Alsthom of Belfort. She remains the most powerful steam turbo-electric-propelled passenger ship ever built. The CGT chose turbo-electric transmission because they felt it was quieter, more easily maintained, and more easily controlled, as it had the ability to use full power from all engines in reverse, removing the need for dedicated astern turbines. The engine installation was heavier than conventional turbines and slightly less efficient at high speed but allowed all propellers to operate even if one engine was not running. An early form of radar was installed to help avoid collisions. The rudder frame, including the 125-ton cast steel connecting rod, was produced by Škoda Works in Czechoslovakia.

Normandie had a significant cost. By the time of her maiden voyage, she had cost 615 million francs, then equal to $43 million (equivalent to $1009.77 million in 2025).

== Interior ==
Normandie's luxurious interiors were designed in Art Déco and Streamline Moderne style by architect Pierre Patout, one of the founders of the Art Deco style. Many sculptures and wall paintings made allusions to Normandy, the province of France for which the ship was named. Drawings and photographs show a series of vast public rooms of great elegance. Her voluminous interior spaces were made possible by having the funnel uptakes split to pass along the sides of the ship, rather than straight upward. French architect Roger-Henri Expert was in charge of the overall decorative scheme.

Most of the public space was devoted to first-class passengers, including the dining room, first-class lounge, grill room, first-class swimming pool, theatre and winter garden. The first-class swimming pool featured staggered depths, with a shallow training beach for children. The children's dining room was decorated by Jean de Brunhoff, who covered the walls with Babar the Elephant and his entourage.

The interiors were filled with grand perspectives, spectacular entryways, and long, wide staircases. First-class suites were given unique designs by select designers. The most luxurious accommodations were the Deauville and Trouville apartments, featuring dining rooms, baby grand pianos, multiple bedrooms, and private decks.

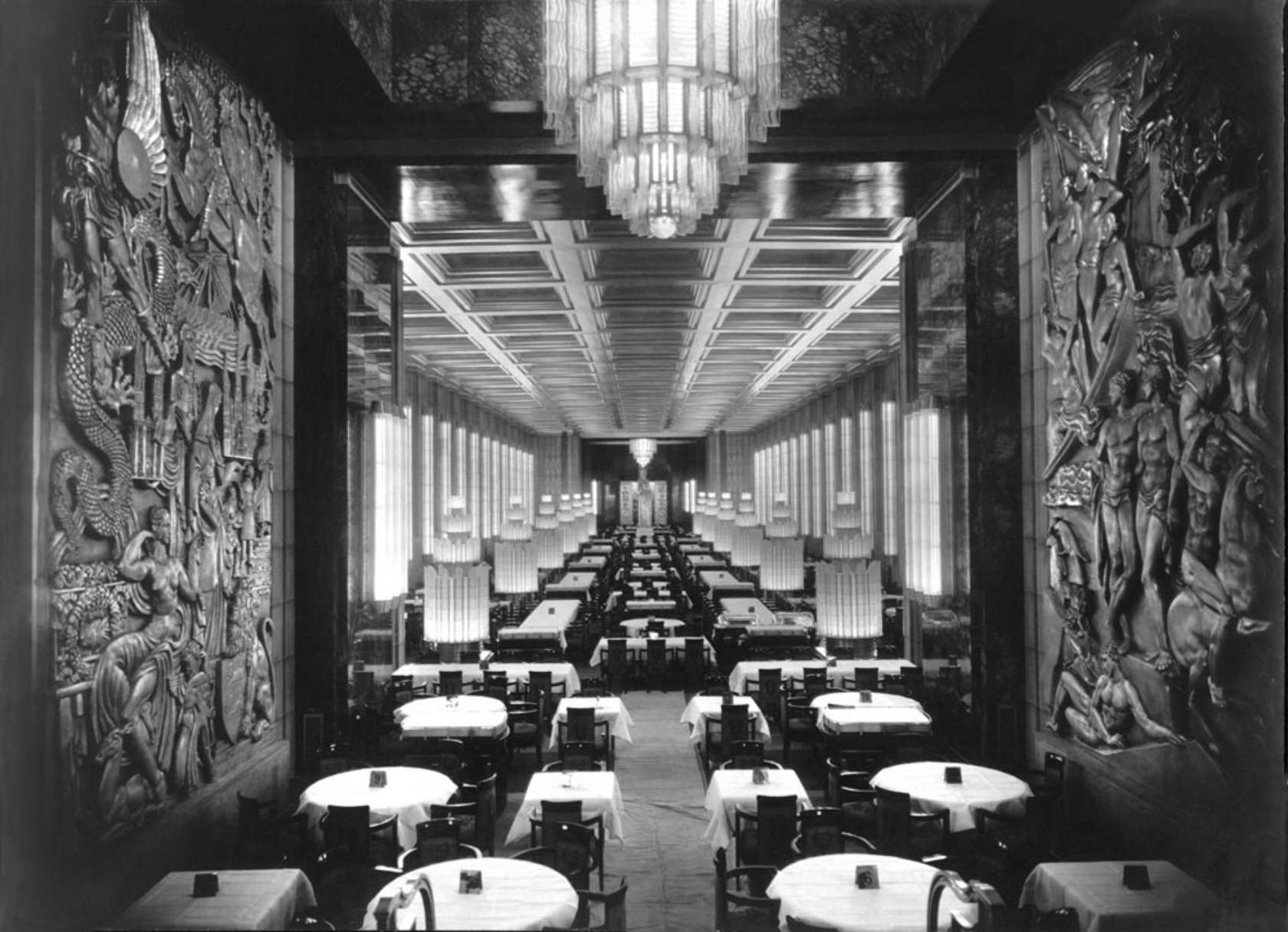
Normandie's main dining room, decorated with Lalique glass and compared to the Hall of Mirrors at Versailles

Normandie's first-class dining hall was the largest room afloat. At 93 m (305 ft), it was longer than the Hall of Mirrors at the Palace of Versailles, 14 m (46 ft) wide, and 8.5 m (28 ft) high. Passengers entered through six-metre-tall (20 ft) doors adorned with bronze medallions by artist Raymond Subes. The room could seat 700 at 157 tables, with Normandie serving as a floating promotion for the most sophisticated French cuisine of the period. As no natural light could enter it was illuminated by twelve tall pillars of Lalique glass flanked by 38 matching columns along the walls. These, with chandeliers hung at each end of the room, earned the Normandie the nickname "Ship of Light" (similar to Paris as the "City of Light").

A popular feature was the café grill, which would be transformed into a nightclub. Adjoining the café grill was the first-class smoking room, which was paneled in large murals depicting ancient Egyptian life. The ship also had indoor and outdoor pools, a chapel, and a theatre which could double as a stage and cinema.

The machinery of Normandie's top deck and forecastle was integrated within the ship, concealing it and releasing nearly all the exposed deck space for passengers. As such it was the only ocean liner to have a regulation-sized open air tennis court on board. The air conditioner units were concealed along with the kennels inside the third, dummy, funnel.

== Career ==
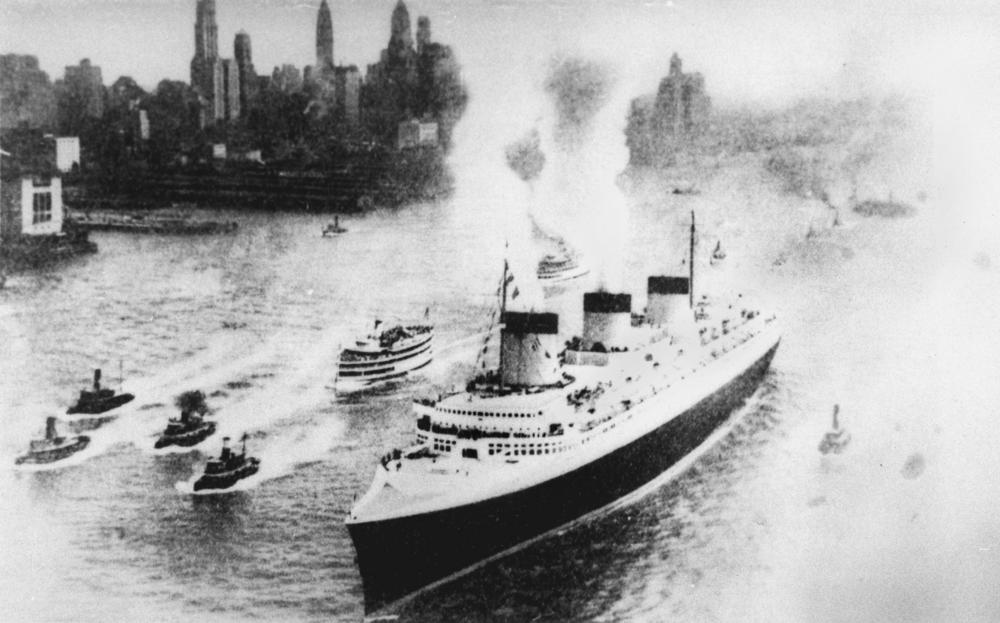
The maiden voyage of SS Normandie

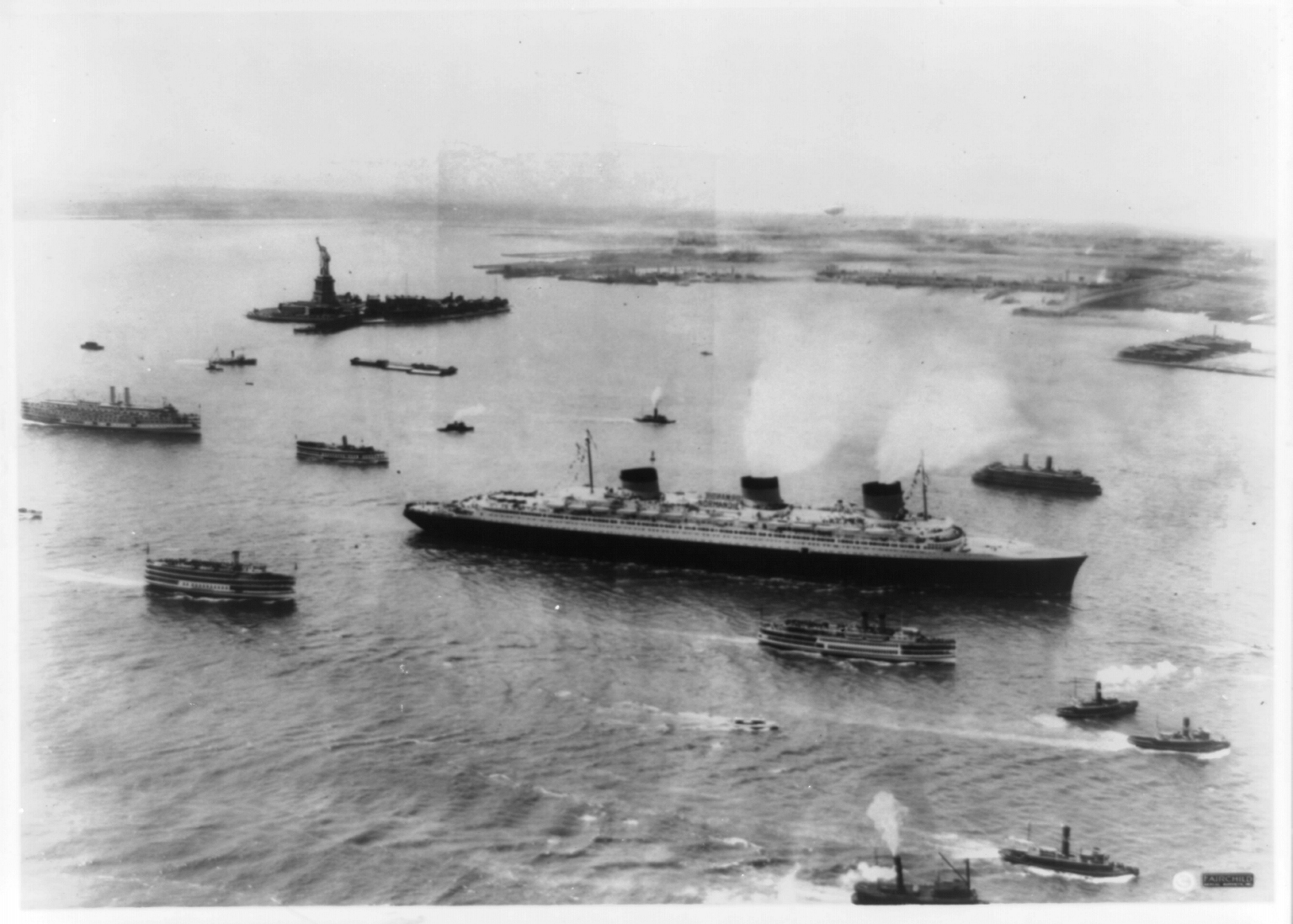
The triumphant arrival of Normandie in New York Harbor in June 1935 on her maiden voyage.

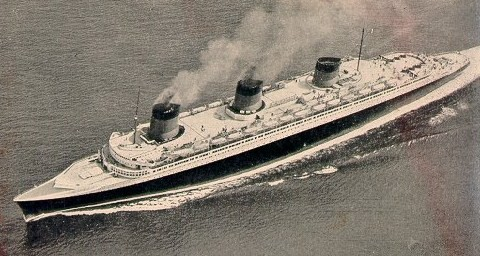
Normandie at sea

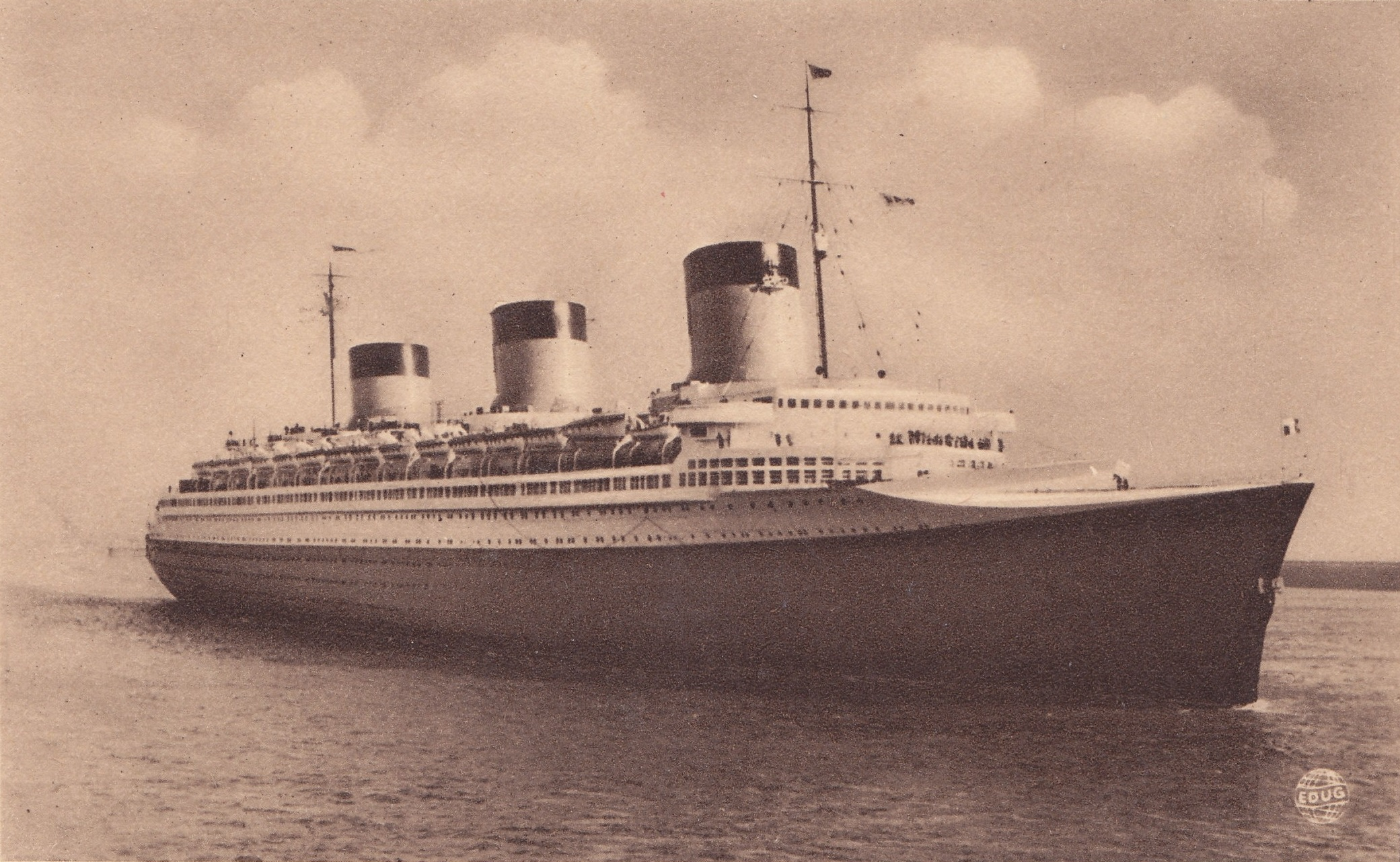
Postcard of the Normandie

Normandie's maiden voyage was on 29 May 1935. At Le Havre she took aboard 812 Passengers: 467 First Class Passengers, 244 Tourist Class and 101 Third Class. 50,000 people saw her off at Le Havre on what was hoped would be a record-breaking crossing. At Southampton she took aboard an additional 195 Passengers: 122 First Class Passengers, 53 Tourist Class and 20 Third Class. Her combined total was 1,007 passengers. First Class was booked at two-thirds capacity with 589, Tourist Class was half booked at 293, while Third Class was at less than a quarter capacity with only 121.

She reached New York City after four days, three hours and two minutes, taking away the Blue Riband from the Italian liner Rex. This brought great pride for the French, who had not won the distinction before. Under the command of Captain René Pugnet, Normandie's average on the maiden voyage was 29.98 knots (55.52 km/h; 34.50 mph) and on the eastbound crossing to France, she averaged over 30 knots (56 km/h; 35 mph), breaking records in both directions.

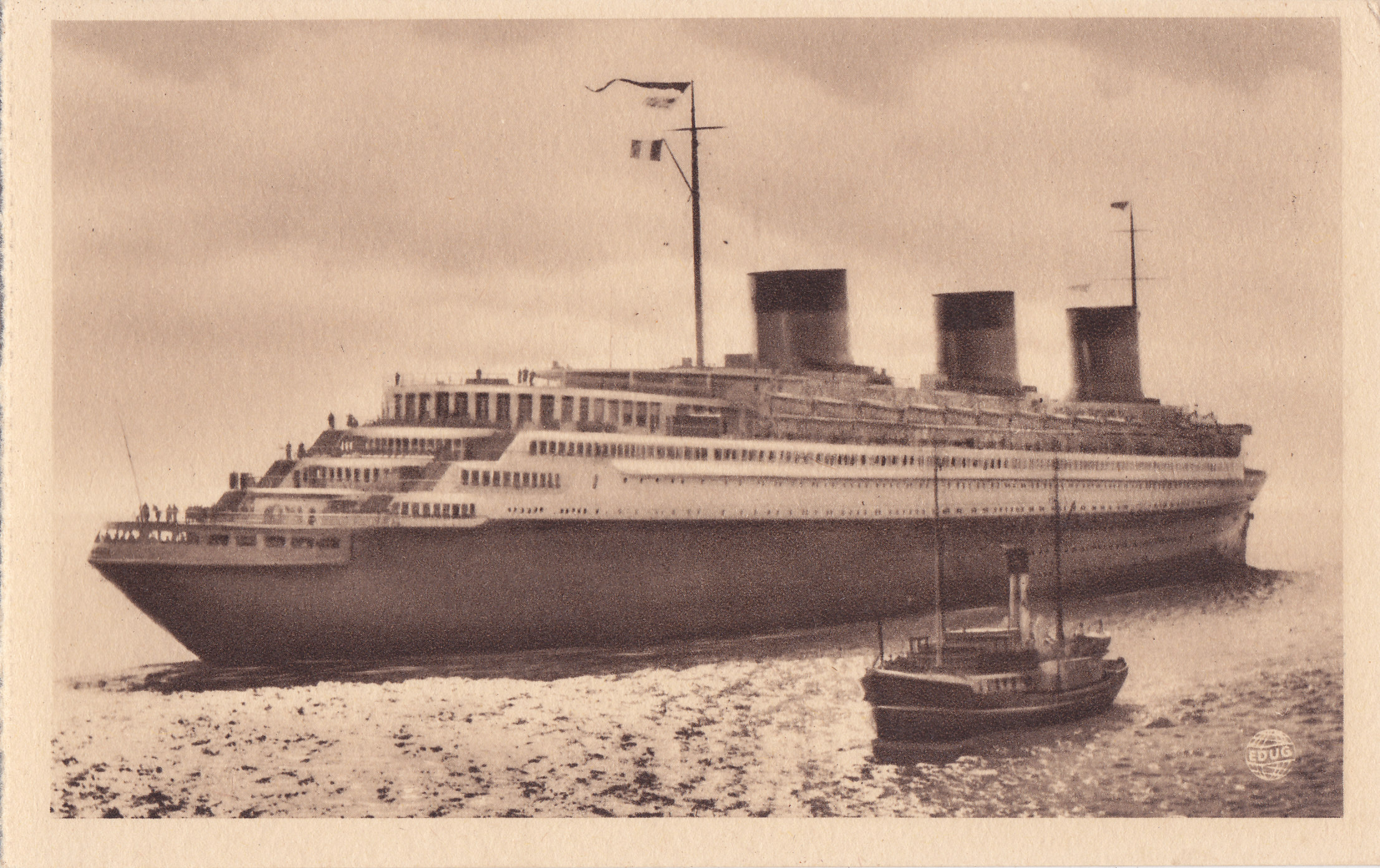
Postcard of SS Normandie

During the maiden voyage, the CGT refused to predict that their ship would win the Blue Riband. However, by the time the ship reached New York, medallions of the Blue Riband victory, made in France, were delivered to passengers and the ship flew a 9-metre-long (30 ft) blue pennant. An estimated 100,000 spectators lined New York Harbor for Normandie's arrival. All passengers were presented with a medal celebrating the occasion on behalf of the CGT.

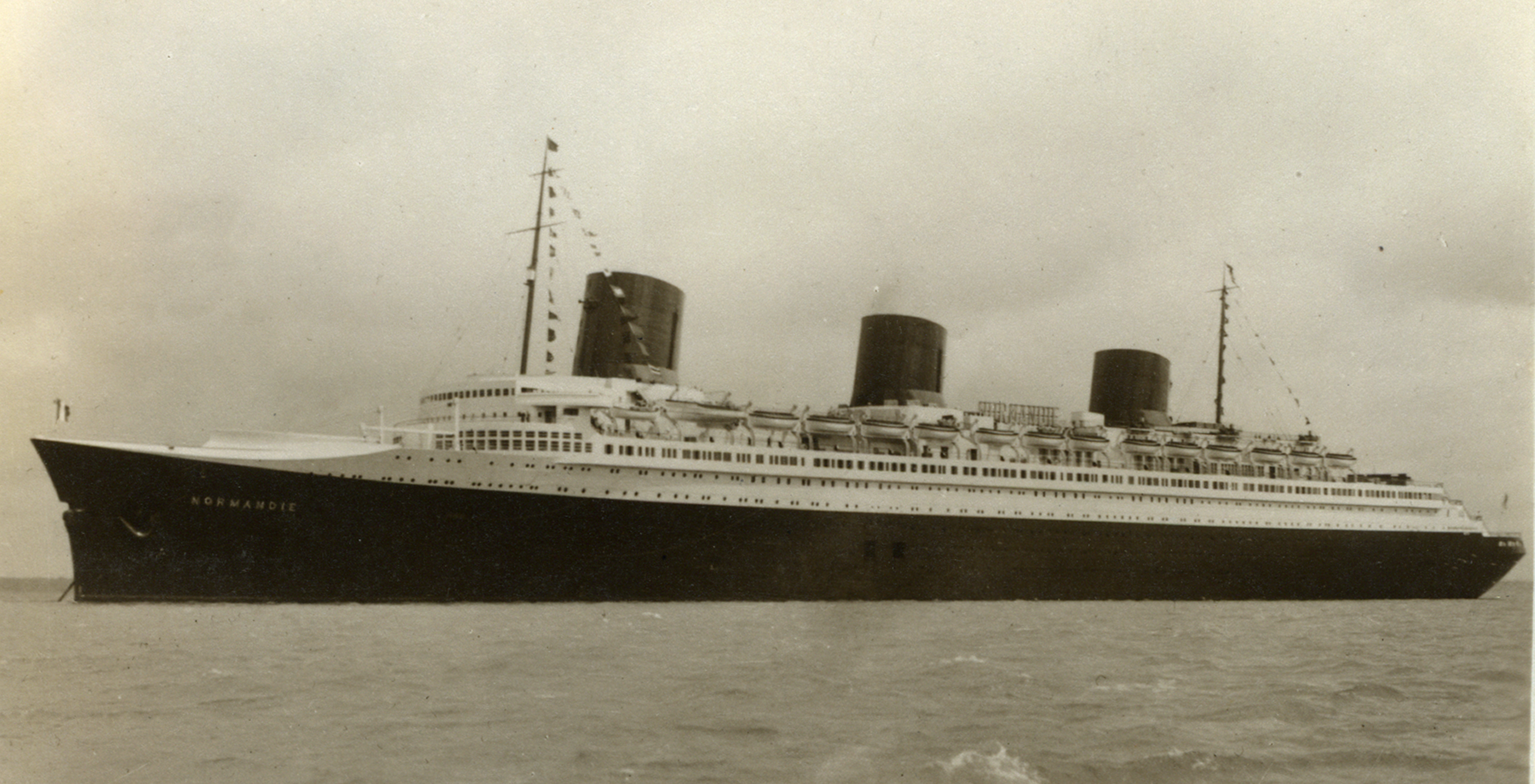
SS Normandie in the seas

Cunard contemporary rival

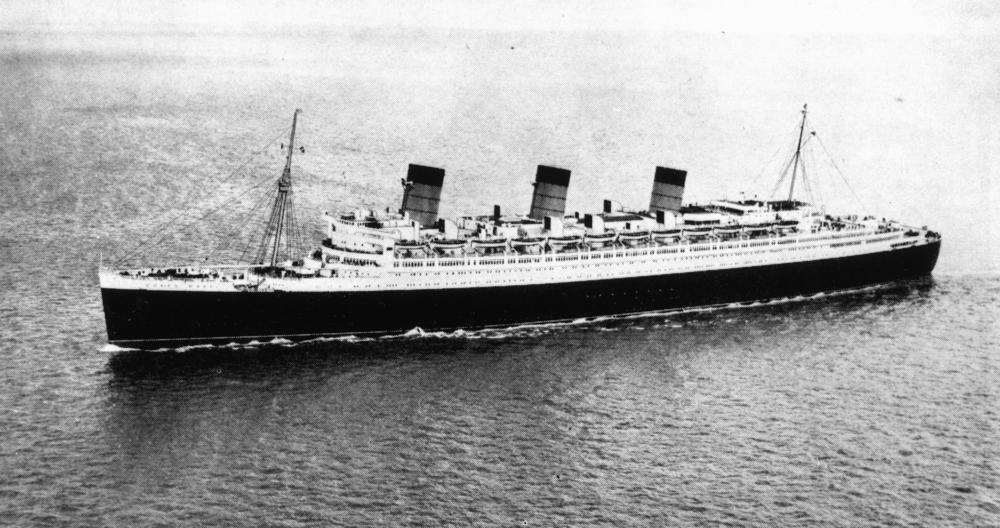
RMS Queen Mary

Normandie had a successful year but modifications were necessary. During her winter layover, CGT increased Normandie's size, mainly through the addition of an enclosed tourist lounge on the aft boat deck, to reduce vibrations. Following these and other alterations, she measured 83,423 GRT when she reentered service in May 1936. In contrast, her rival, Queen Mary, Cunard White Star Line's superliner, which entered service later that month, was only 80,774 gross registered tons. As such, Normandie retained the title of world's largest ship until Cunard White Star Line's RMS Queen Elizabeth at 83,673 gross registered tons formally entered service in 1946.

On 22 June 1936, a Blackburn Baffin, S5162 of A Flight, RAF Gosport, flown by Lt Guy Kennedy Horsey on torpedo-dropping practice, buzzed Normandie two kilometres (one nautical mile) off Ryde Pier and collided with a derrick which was transferring a motor car belonging to Arthur Evans, MP, onto a barge alongside the ship. The aircraft crashed onto Normandie's bow. The pilot was taken off by tender, but the wreckage of the aircraft remained on board Normandie as she had to sail due to the tide. It was carried to Le Havre. A salvage team from the Royal Air Force later removed the wreckage. Horsey was court-martialled and found guilty on two charges, and Evans' car was wrecked in the accident.

In August 1936, Queen Mary captured the Blue Riband, averaging 30.14 knots (55.82 km/h; 34.68 mph), starting a fierce rivalry. To recapture the speed record, CGT modified Normandie to reduce vibration and increase her speed. CGT replaced her three-bladed propellers with four-bladed ones, and made structural modifications to her lower aft section. These modifications reduced vibration at speed. In July 1937, she regained the Blue Riband, but Queen Mary took it back in 1938. After this, the captain of Normandie sent a message: "Bravo to the Queen Mary until next time!" This rivalry could have gone on into the 1940s, but was ended by the Second World War.

Normandie carried distinguished passengers, including the authors Colette and Ernest Hemingway; the wife of French president Albert Lebrun; songwriters Noël Coward and Irving Berlin; and Hollywood celebrities such as Fred Astaire, Marlene Dietrich, Walt Disney, Douglas Fairbanks, Jr, conductor Arturo Toscanini and James Stewart. She also carried the von Trapp family singers (later immortalized in The Sound of Music) from New York to Southampton in 1938; from Southampton, the family toured Scandinavia before returning to the United States.

== Planned running mate – SS Bretagne ==
Normandie never repaid any of the loans that made her construction possible. Despite this, the CGT considered commissioning a sister ship, SS Bretagne, which was to be even longer and larger. There were two competing designs for this ship – one conservative, one radical. The conservative design was essentially an enlarged Normandie with two funnels. The radical one was from Normandie's designer, Vladimir Yourkevitch, and had a long, streamlined superstructure with twin, side-by-side funnels just abaft the bridge. The more conservative design was chosen, but the outbreak of the war halted the plan permanently.

== Popularity ==
Although Normandie won praise for her design and decor, ultimately North Atlantic passengers flocked to the more traditional Queen Mary. Two of the ship's greatest attributes, in reality, turned out to be two of her biggest faults.

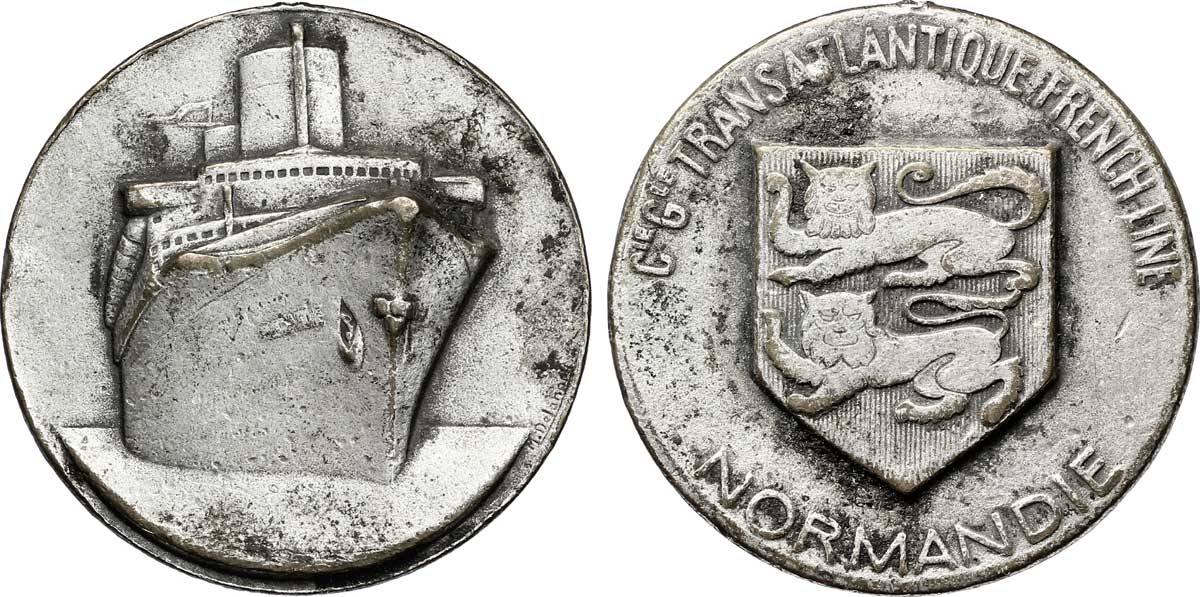
Normandie depicted on a token

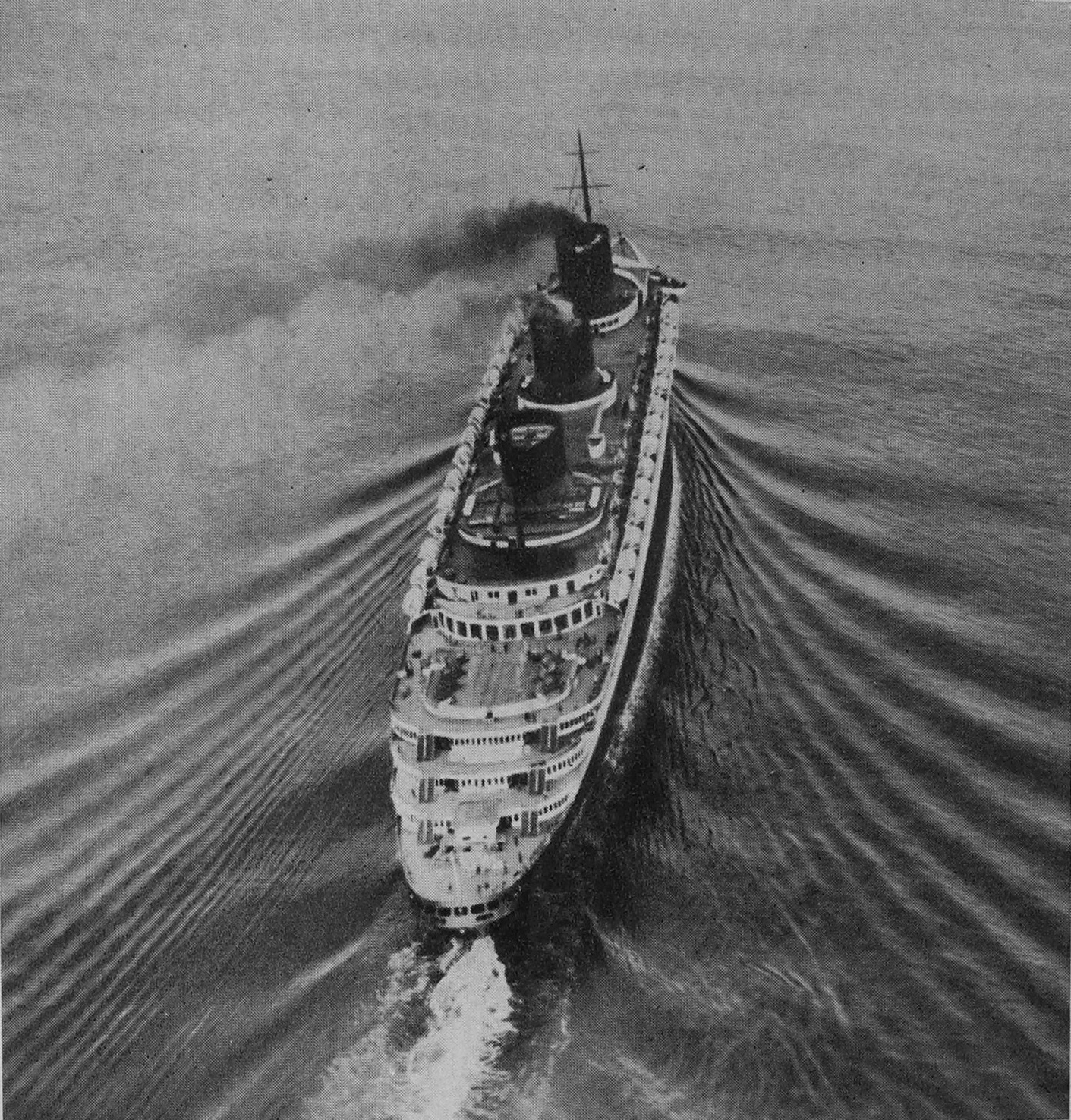
Overhead view of Normandie at sea

Part of Normandie's problem lay in the fact that the majority of her passenger space was devoted to first class, which could carry up to 848 people. Less space and consideration were given to second and tourist class, which numbered only 670 and 454 passengers, respectively. As a result, the consensus among North Atlantic passengers was that she was primarily a ship for the rich and famous. In contrast, in Queen Mary, Cunard White Star had placed just as much emphasis on décor, space, and accommodation in second and tourist class as in first class. Thus Queen Mary accommodated American tourists, who had become numerous in the 1920s and 1930s. Many of these passengers could not afford first-class passage yet wanted to travel in much of the same comfort as that experienced in first. As a result, second and tourist class became a significant source of cash for shipping companies at that time. Queen Mary would accommodate these trends and subsequently the liner achieved greater popularity among North Atlantic travellers during the late thirties.

Another of the CGT's greatest triumphs also turned out to be one of Normandie's greatest flaws: her décor. The ship's sleek and modern Art Deco interior was unsuitable for her travelers. Queen Mary triumphed over her French rival. Although the ship was also decorated in an Art Deco style, Queen Mary was more restrained in her appointments and was not as radical as Normandie, and proved ultimately to be more popular with travelers.

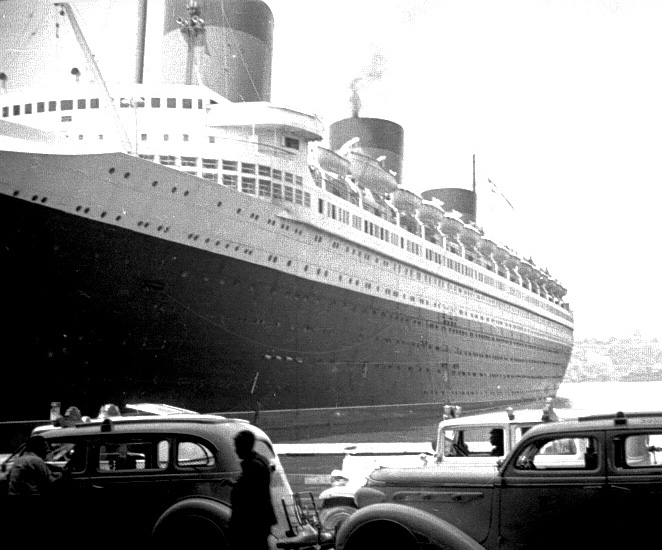
Normandie at C.G.T.'s pier 88 in New York

As a result, Normandie at many times throughout her service history carried less than half her full complement of passengers. Her German rivals Bremen and Europa, and Italian rivals Rex and Conte di Savoia also suffered from this problem; despite their innovative designs and luxurious interiors, they made little profit for their respective companies. Contributing to this were international boycotts against Germany and Italy as the European geopolitical situation deteriorated through the 1930s.

In contrast, Cunard White Star's Britannic III, Georgic II, and much older Aquitania, along with the Holland America Line's SS Nieuw Amsterdam, were among the few North Atlantic liners to make a profit, carrying the lion's share of passengers in the years preceding the Second World War.

Sometime in 1939, the famous Von Trapp Family Singers stayed in third class and traveled to Southampton aboard the Normandie. In Part 2, chapter 5 of "The Story of the Trapp Family Singers", the autobiography of Maria Augusta Trapp, Maria describes the Trapp Family's experience aboard the Normandie. She states, "The Normandie! What a noble boat, and what a wonderful crew! although we were only third-class passengers, the French-line went out of its way to make our stay as enjoyable as possible ... On board the Normandie we were treated as celebrated artists. People knew about our Town Hall concert and we were asked to give a gala performance on the last evening together with Rene Le Roy, the flutist. Champagne was served free of charge afterwards. The boat itself was a dream of beauty ... But four days was not too short to create a warm feeling for the boat and its crew, and when, years later, we learned of the dreadful disaster the Normandie had suffered in New York, we felt as if something terrible had happened to a close friend of ours."

== World War II ==
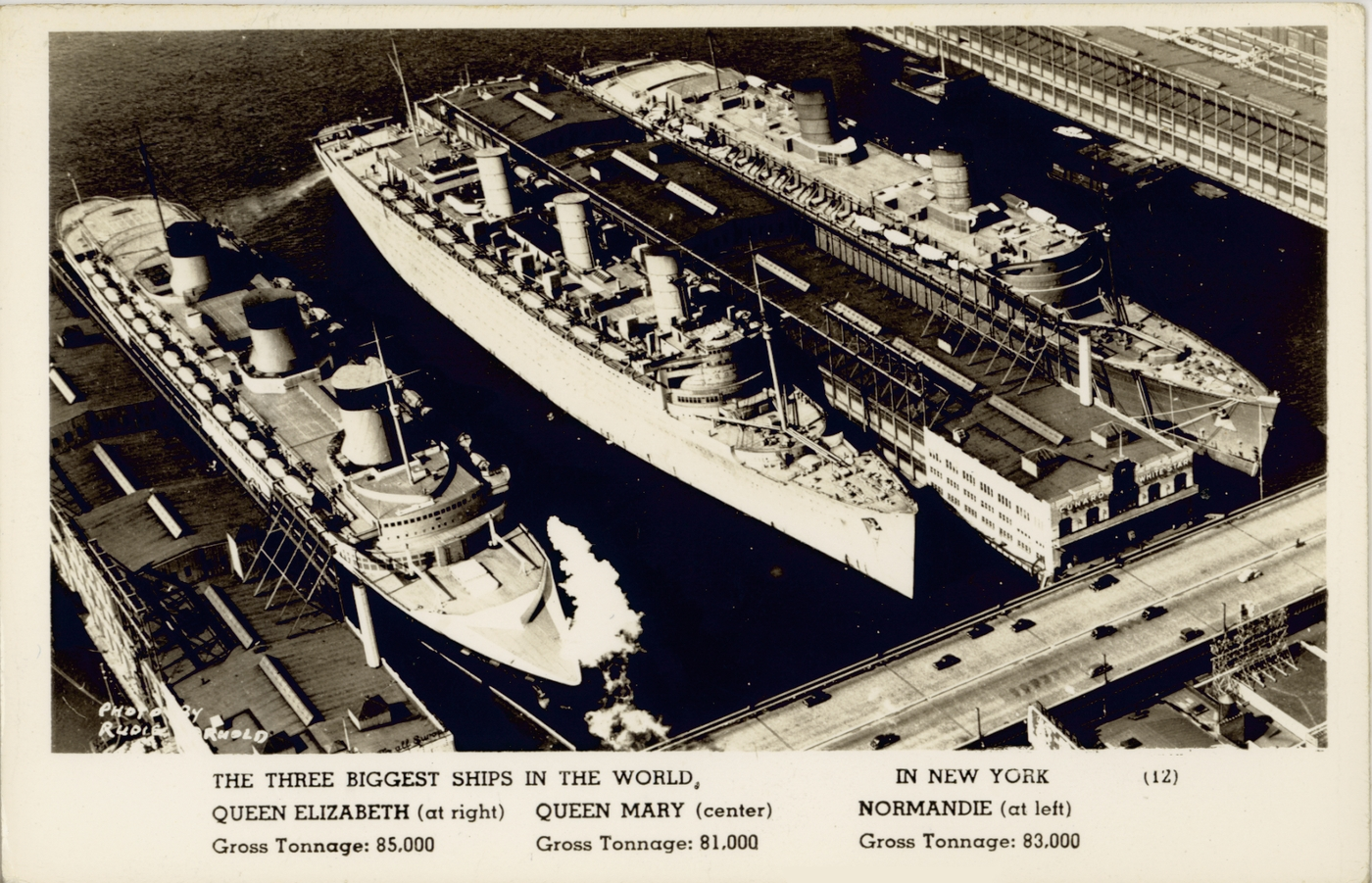
Normandie, Queen Mary and Queen Elizabeth in New York Harbor in 1940

The outbreak of the war found Normandie in New York Harbor. Looming hostilities in Europe had compelled Normandie to seek haven in the U.S. The federal government interned her on 3 September 1939, the same day France declared war on Germany. Several days later, Queen Mary moored nearby. Queen Elizabeth joined them several months later in March 1940. For approximately two weeks, the three largest liners in the world sat side by side, before Queen Mary departed later that month for Sydney, Australia. Queen Elizabeth departed in November 1940 for Singapore. Normandie remained at the pier in French hands, with French crewmembers on board, led by Captain Hervé Lehuédé, into the spring of 1940.

On 15 May 1940, during the Battle of France, the U.S. Treasury Department detailed about 150 agents of the United States Coast Guard (USCG) to go aboard the ship at Manhattan's Pier 88 to defend it against possible sabotage. (At the time, U.S. law mandated the Coast Guard as part of the Treasury during peacetime.) When the USCG became a part of the United States Navy on 1 November 1941, Normandie's USCG detail remained intact, mainly observing while the French crew maintained the vessel's boilers, machinery, and other equipment, including the fire-watch system. On 12 December 1941, five days after the attack on Pearl Harbor, the USCG removed Captain Lehuédé and his crew and took possession of Normandie under the right of angary, maintaining steam in the boilers and other activities on the idled vessel. However, the elaborate fire-watch system which ensured that any fire would be suppressed before it became a danger was abandoned.

=== Lafayette conversion ===
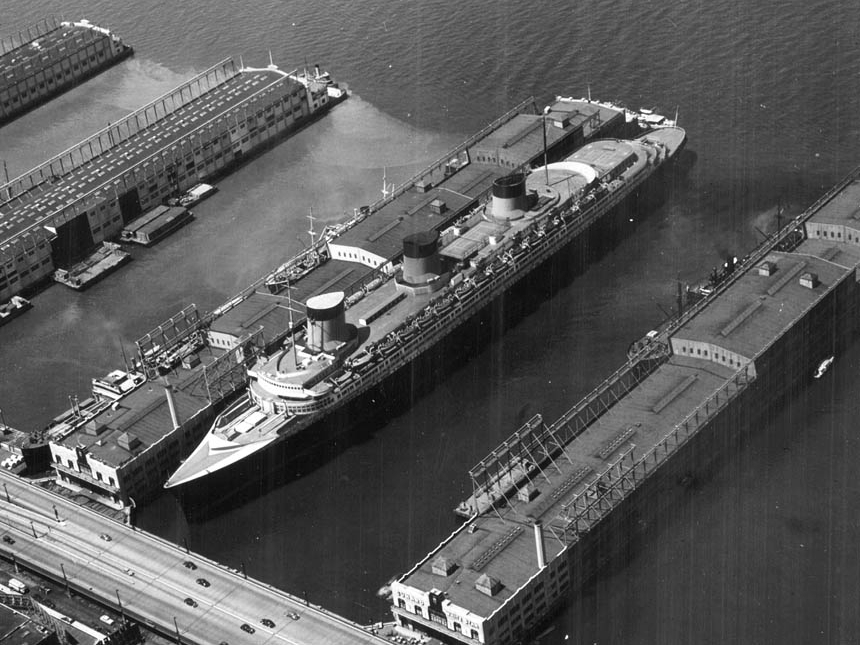
Normandie docked in New York Harbor at Pier 88, site of attempted troopship conversion

On 20 December 1941, the Auxiliary Vessels Board officially recorded President Franklin D. Roosevelt's approval of Normandie's transfer to the U.S. Navy. Plans called for the vessel to be turned into a troopship ("convoy unit loaded transport"). The Navy renamed her USS Lafayette, in honor of both Marquis de la Fayette, the French general who fought on the Colonies' behalf in the American Revolution, and the alliance with France that made American independence possible. The name was a suggestion of J. P. "Jim" Warburg, advisory assistant to Colonel William J. Donovan, Coordinator of Information, which was passed through multiple channels including Secretary of the Navy Frank Knox; Admiral Harold R. Stark, Chief of Naval Operations (CNO); and Rear Adm. Randall Jacobs, Chief of the Bureau of Navigation. The name La Fayette (later universally and unofficially contracted to Lafayette) was officially approved by the secretary of the navy on 31 December 1941, with the vessel classified as a transport, AP-53.

Earlier proposals included turning Lafayette into an aircraft carrier, but this was dropped in favor of immediate troop transport. The ship remained moored at Pier 88 for the conversion. A contract for her conversion to a troop transport was awarded to Robins Dry Dock and Repair Company, a subsidiary of Todd Shipyards, on 27 December 1941. On that date, Capt. Clayton M. Simmers, the 3rd Naval District Materiel Officer, reported to the Bureau of Ships (BuShips) his estimate that the conversion work could be completed by 31 January 1942, and planning for the work proceeded on that basis.

Capt. Robert G. Coman reported as Lafayette's prospective commanding officer on 31 January 1942, overseeing a skeleton engineering force numbering 458 men. The complicated nature and enormous size of the conversion effort prevented Coman's crew from adhering to the original schedule; crew familiarization with the vessel was an issue, and additional crew members were arriving to assist the effort. On 6 February 1942, a request for a two-week delay for the first sailing of Lafayette, originally scheduled for 14 February, was submitted to the Assistant Chief of Naval Operations. On that day, a schedule extension was granted due to a design plan change: elements of the superstructure were to be removed to improve stability, in work that was expected to take another 60 to 90 days. However, on 7 February, orders came from Washington that the reduction of the top-hamper had been abandoned and Lafayette was to sail on 14 February as planned. This abrupt reversal necessitated a frantic resumption of conversion work, and Captains Coman and Simmers scheduled 9 February meetings in New York and Washington to lobby for further clarification of conversion plans; ultimately, these meetings would never take place.

=== Fire and capsizing ===
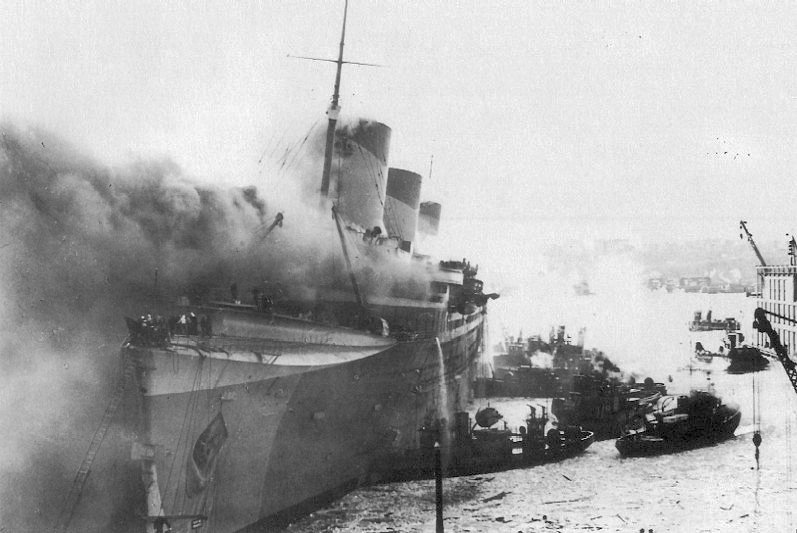
Lafayette (AP-53) afire at New York Harbor on 9 February 1942

At 14:30 on 9 February 1942, sparks from a welding torch used by workman Clement Derrick ignited a stack of life vests filled with flammable kapok that had been stored in Lafayette's first-class lounge. The flammable varnished woodwork had not yet been removed, and the fire spread rapidly. The ship had a very efficient fire protection system, but it had been disconnected during the conversion and its internal pumping system was deactivated. The New York City Fire Department's hoses did not fit the ship's French inlets. Before the fire department arrived, approximately 15 minutes after fire broke out, all onboard crew were using manual means in a vain attempt to stop the blaze. A strong northwesterly wind blowing over Lafayette's port quarter swept the blaze forward, eventually consuming the three upper decks of the ship within an hour of the start of the conflagration. Capt. Coman, along with Capt. Simmers, arrived about 15:25 to see his huge prospective command in flames.

USS Lafayette capsized in New York Harbor

As firefighters on shore and in fire boats poured water on the blaze, Lafayette developed a dangerous list to port due to water pumped into the seaward side by fireboats. Vladimir Yourkevitch, the ship's designer, arrived at the scene to offer expertise but was barred by harbor police. Yourkevitch's suggestion was to enter the vessel and open the sea-cocks. This would flood the lower decks and make her settle the few feet to the bottom. With the ship stabilised, water could be pumped into burning areas without the risk of capsizing. The suggestion was rejected by the commander of the 3rd Naval District, Rear Admiral Adolphus Andrews.

Between 17:45 and 18:00 on 9 February 1942, authorities considered the fire under control and began winding down operations until 20:00. Water entering Lafayette through submerged openings and flowing to the lower decks negated efforts to counter-flood, and her list to port gradually increased. Shortly after midnight, Rear Adm. Andrews ordered Lafayette abandoned. The ship continued to list, a process hastened by the 6,000 tons of water that had been sprayed on her. New York fire officials were concerned that the fire could spread to the nearby buildings. Lafayette eventually capsized during the mid watch (02:45) on 10 February, nearly crushing a fire boat, and came to rest on her port side at an angle of approximately 80 degrees. Recognising that his incompetence had caused the disaster, Rear Adm. Andrews ordered all pressmen barred from viewing the moment of capsize in an effort to lower the level of publicity.

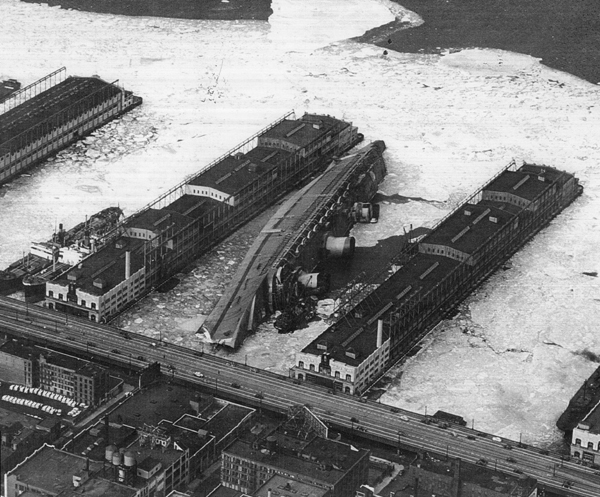
Normandie, renamed USS Lafayette, lies capsized in the frozen mud of her New York pier in the winter of 1942

One man died in the incident – Frank "Trent" Trentacosta, 36, of Brooklyn, a member of the fire watch. Some 94 USCG and Navy sailors, including some from Lafayette's pre-commissioning crew and men assigned to the receiving ship Seattle, 38 fire fighters, and 153 civilians, were treated for various injuries, burns, smoke inhalation, and exposure.

==== Saboteur (film) ====
The ruined Lafayette after the fire can be seen briefly in the film Saboteur (1942). The ship is not identified in the film, but the antagonist smiles when he sees it, suggesting that he was responsible. The film's director, Alfred Hitchcock, later said that "the Navy raised hell" about the implication that their security was so poor.

=== Investigation and salvage ===
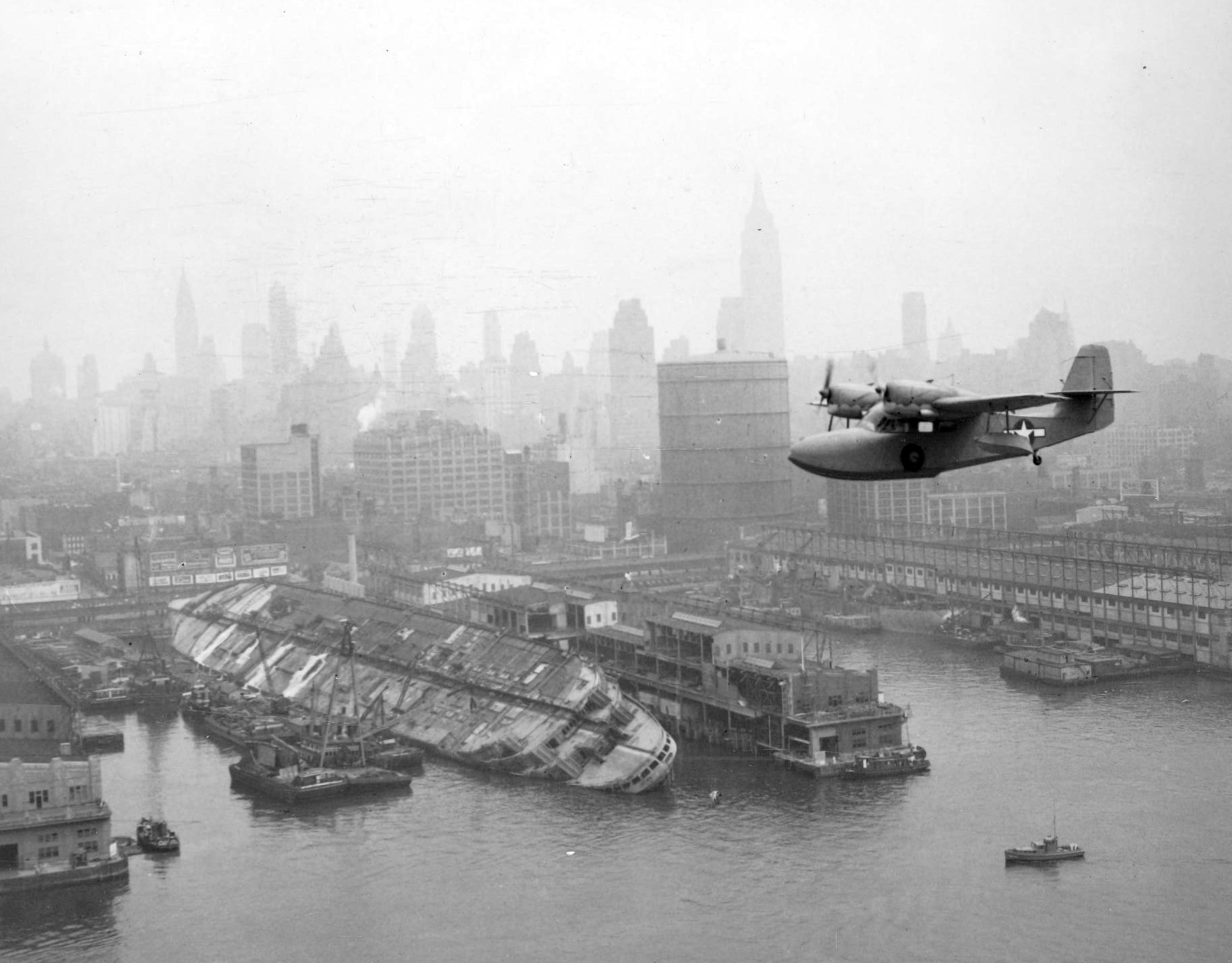
U.S. Coast Guard Grumman Widgeon flies over wreck of Lafayette in New York 1943

Enemy sabotage was widely suspected, but a congressional investigation in the wake of the sinking, chaired by Representative Patrick Henry Drewry (D-Virginia), concluded that the fire was accidental. The investigation found evidence of carelessness, rule violations, lack of coordination between the various parties on board, lack of clear command structure during the fire, and a hasty, poorly planned conversion effort.

Members of organized crime retrospectively claimed that they had sabotaged the vessel. It was alleged that arson had been organized by mobster Anthony Anastasio, who was a power in the local longshoremen's union, to provide leverage for the release of mob boss Charles "Lucky" Luciano from prison. Luciano's end of the bargain would be to ensure that there would be no further "enemy" sabotage in the ports where the mob had strong influence with the unions. (Note: The suggestion that the fire was caused by arson comes from Meyer Lansky and Luciano themselves.)

In one of the largest and most expensive salvage operations of its kind, estimated at $5 million at the time (equivalent to $93 million in 2025), the ship was stripped of superstructure and righted on 7 August 1943. She was renamed Lafayette and reclassified as an aircraft and transport ferry, APV-4, on 15 September 1943 and placed in drydock the following month. However, extensive damage to her hull, deterioration of her machinery, and the necessity for employing manpower on other more critical war projects prevented resumption of the conversion program, with the cost of restoring her determined to be too great. Her hulk remained in the Navy's custody through the end of the war.

Lafayette was stricken from the Naval Vessel Register on 11 October 1945 without having ever sailed under the U.S. flag. President Harry Truman authorized her disposal in an Executive Order on 8 September 1946, and she was sold as scrap on 3 October 1946 to Lipsett, Inc., an American salvage company based in New York City, for US$161,680 (approx. $1,997,000 in 2017 value). After neither the Navy nor French Line offered a plan to salvage her, Yourkevitch, the ship's original designer, proposed to cut the ship down and restore her as a mid-sized liner. This plan also failed to draw backing. She was sent for scrapping beginning in October 1946 at Port Newark, New Jersey, and completely scrapped by 31 December 1948.

== Legacy ==
The silhouette of Normandie influenced ocean liners over the decades, including Queen Mary 2. The ambience of classic transatlantic liners like Normandie and Queen Mary was the source of inspiration for Disney Cruise Line's matching vessels, Disney Magic, Disney Wonder, Disney Dream, and Disney Fantasy.

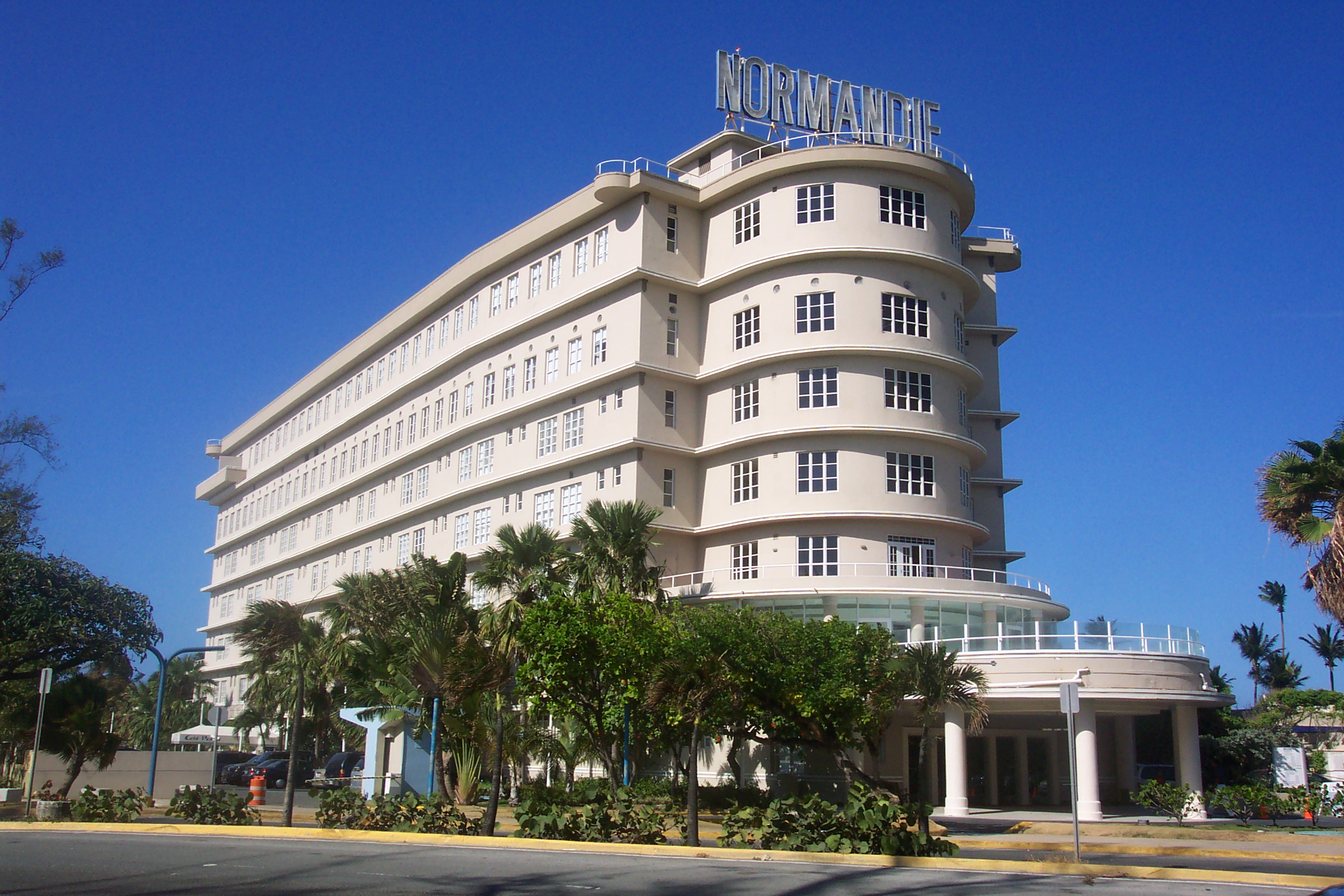
The Normandie Hotel in San Juan, Puerto Rico

Normandie also inspired the architecture and design of the Normandie Hotel in San Juan, Puerto Rico. The hotel's roof sign is one of the two signs that adorned the top deck of Normandie but were removed from it during an early refitting. It also inspired the nickname 'The Normandie' given to the International Savings Society Apartments in Shanghai, one of the most fashionable residential buildings during the city's pre-revolutionary heyday and home to several stars of China's mid-20th century film industry. Normandie's name also may have inspired that of The Normandy apartment building in New York City.

Items from Normandie were sold at a series of auctions after her demise, and many pieces are considered valuable Art Deco treasures today. The rescued items include the ten large dining-room door medallions and fittings, and some of the individual Jean Dupas glass panels that formed the large murals mounted at the four corners of her Grand Salon. One entire corner is preserved at the Metropolitan Museum of Art in New York. The dining room door medallions are now on the exterior doors of Our Lady of Lebanon Maronite Cathedral in Brooklyn.

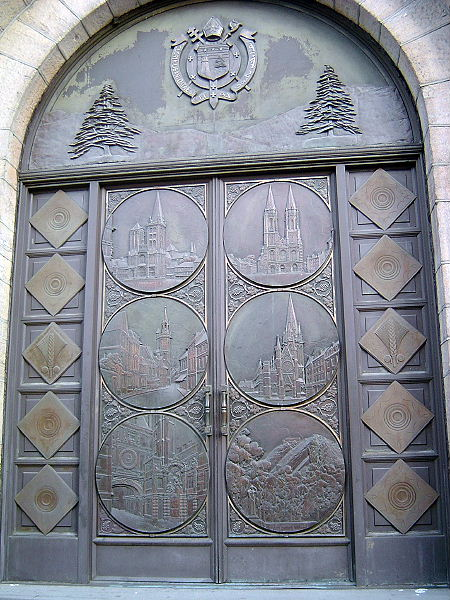
Dining room door medallions

Also surviving are some examples of the 24,000 pieces of crystal, some from the massive Lalique torchères that adorned her dining salon. Also extant are some of the room's table silverware, chairs, and gold-plated bronze table bases. Custom-designed suite and cabin furniture as well as original artwork and statues that decorated the ship, or were built for use by the CGT aboard Normandie, also survive today.

The 2.4-metre-high (8 ft), 450 kg (1,000 lb) bronze figural sculpture of a woman named "La Normandie", which was at the top of the grand stairway from the first class smoking room up to the grill room café, was found in a New Jersey scrapyard in 1954 and was purchased for the then-new Fontainebleau Hotel in Miami Beach, Florida. It was first displayed outside in the parterre gardens near the formal pool and later indoors near the then-Fontainebleau Hilton's spa. In 2001, the hotel sold the statue to Celebrity Cruises, which placed it in the main dining room of their new ship Celebrity Summit. The cruise ship also had a separate Normandie Restaurant, designed to reflect the interiors of the liner, and containing gold lacquered panels from the Normandie's First Class Smoking Room. The Normandie Restaurant and associated ocean liner decor was removed in 2015. The statue "La Paix", which stood in the First Class Dining Room, now stands in the Pinelawn Memorial Park, a cemetery in New York.

The three-note chime steam whistle, after salvage, was sent to the Bethlehem Steel factory in Bethlehem, Pennsylvania, where it was used to announce shift changes. It later resided in the Pratt Institute in Brooklyn and was used in their New Year's Eve steam whistle ceremony until 2014.

Pieces from Normandie occasionally appear on the BBC television series Antiques Roadshow and also on its American counterpart. A public lounge and promenade was created from some of the panels and furniture from Normandie in the Hilton Chicago. The dining room "Normandie" on the Carnival Cruise ship Carnival Pride was also inspired by the ocean liner, per the ship's designer Joseph Farcus.

Though not shown explicitly, "the majestic form of the Normandie" appears in the Tintin story, The Broken Ear.

== Profile views ==
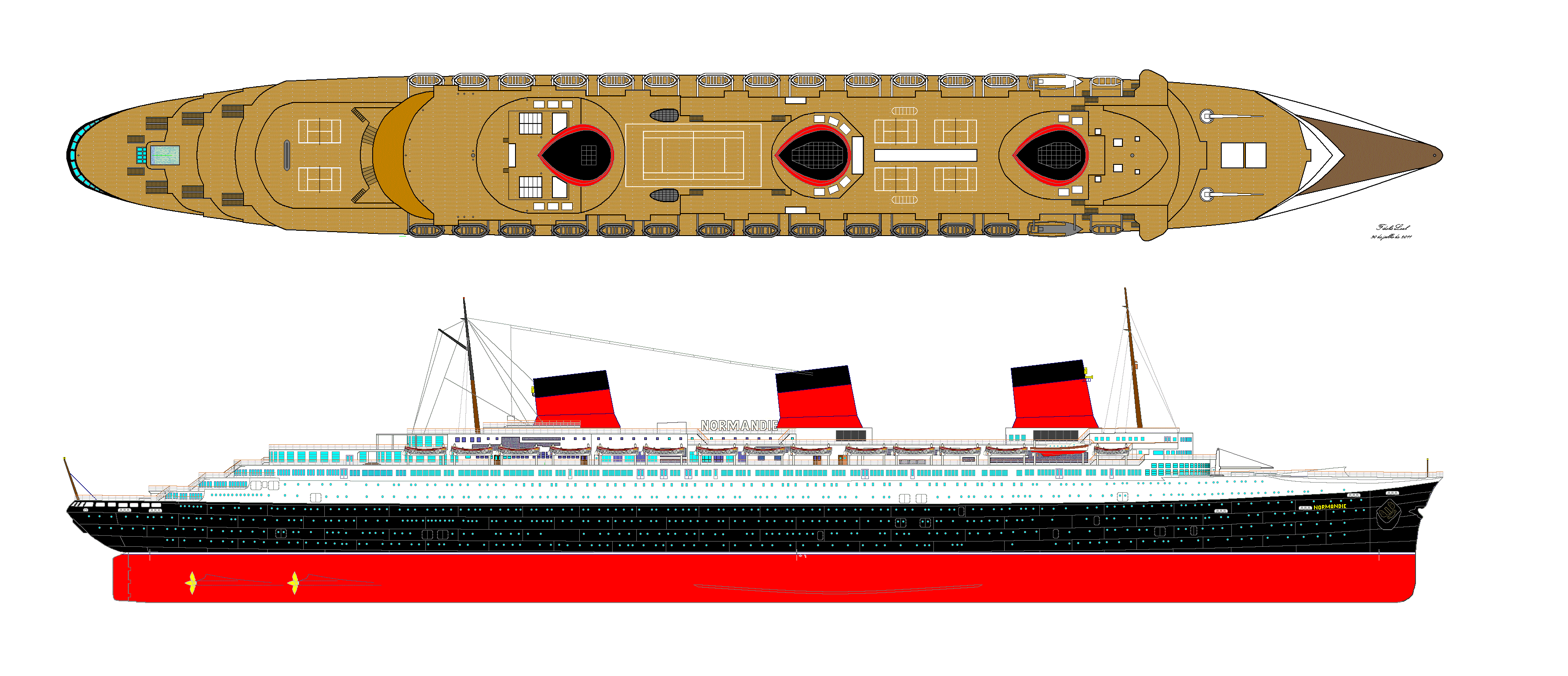
Starboard and side elevation diagram of Normandie's Streamline Moderne profile. The third funnel was a dummy employed to balance the ship aesthetically and contain the air conditioning machinery. This third funnel also was known to contain the dog kennels.

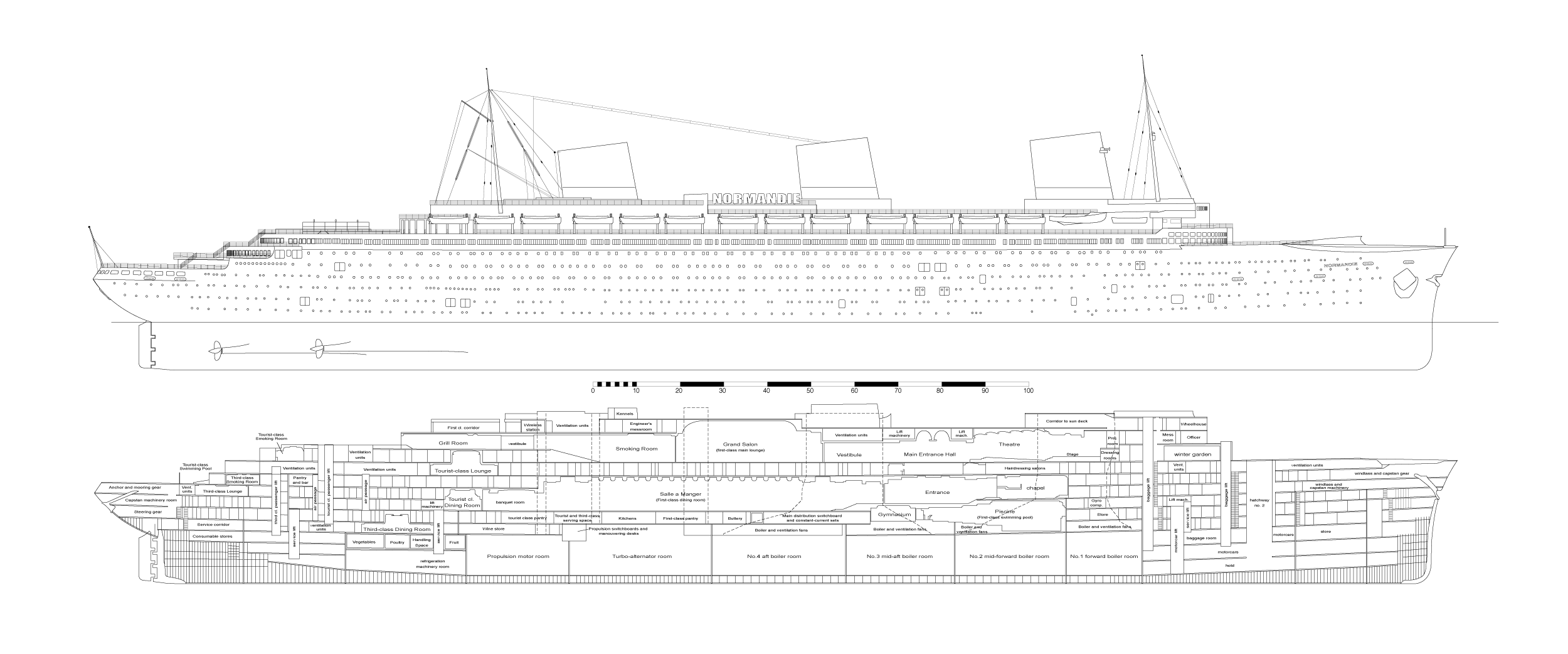
Side elevation and cutaway, revealing the vast internal spaces devoted to Normandie's public compartments

== See also ==
- The Big Broadcast of 1938, a 1938 film that featured the fictional ocean liner SS Colossal, based upon SS Normandie
- Oceanic III
- Pierre-Marie Poisson
- RMS Queen Elizabeth
- SS France (1960)
- SS Ile de France
- SS Liberté
- SS Paris (1916)

== Bibliography ==
This article incorporates text from the public domain Dictionary of American Naval Fighting Ships.

- Ardman, Harvey (1985). Normandie, Her Life and Times. New York: Franklin Watts. ISBN 0-531-09784-6. OCLC 1359091087 – via Internet Archive.
- Bathe, Basil W. (1972). Seven Centuries of Sea Travel: from the Crusaders to the Cruises. London: Barrie & Jenkins. ISBN 0-214-66811-8.
- Bondanella, Peter E. (2004). Hollywood Italians: Dagos, Palookas, Romeos, Wise Guys, and Sopranos. New York: Continuum International Publishing Group. ISBN 0-8264-1544-X.
- Braynard, Frank O. (1987). Picture History of the Normandie With 190 Illustrations. New York: Dover Publications. ISBN 0-486-25257-4.
- Brinnin, John Malcolm (1971). The Sway of the Grand Saloon: a Social History of the North Atlantic. New York: Delacorte Press.
- Coleman, Terry (1977). The liners: a history of the North Atlantic crossing. Harmondsworth: Penguin Books.
- Cressman, Robert J. (2 May 2007). "Lafayette (AP 53) ex-Normandie". Dictionary of American Naval Fighting Ships. U.S. Naval Historical Center. Archived from the original on 10 March 2009.
- Fox, Robert (1999). Liners: The Golden Age. Die große Zeit der Ozeanriesen. L'Âge d'or des paquebots. Cologne: Konneman.
- Foucart, Bruno; Robichon, François (1985). Normandie: Queen of the Seas. New York: Vendome Press. ISBN 0-86565-057-8.
- Gosch, Martin A; Hammer, Richard (1974). The Last Testament of Lucky Luciano. Boston: Little, Brown and Company.
- Kludas, Arnold (2000). Record breakers of the North Atlantic – Blue Riband Liners 1838-1952. London: Chatham Publishing.
- Maddocks, Melvin (1978). The Great Liners. Alexandria, VA: Time-Life Books.
- Maxtone-Graham, John (1972). The Only Way to Cross. New York: Collier Books. ISBN 0-02-096010-7.
- Maxtone-Graham, John (2007). Normandie: France's Legendary Art Deco Ocean Liner. New York: W. W. Norton & Co. ISBN 978-0-393-06120-8.
- Miller, William H. (2013). SS Normandie. Classic Liners series. Stroud, Gloucestershire: The History Press. ISBN 978-0-7524-8808-0.
- Priolo, Gary P. (25 April 2008). "Lafayette (AP-53)". NavSource.
- Schenk, Paul (2013). The Silent Front: Tales of Our Navy Salvage Divers. Blurb.
- Smith, Daniella Ohad (March 2011). "Legendary Interiors and Illustrious Travelers aboard the SS Normandie". Interiors: Design, Architecture, Culture. 2 (1): 128–131. doi:10.2752/204191211X12980384100274. S2CID 194098328.
- Spoto, Donald (1999). The Dark Side of Genius: The Life of Alfred Hitchcock. Da Capo. ISBN 0-306-80932-X.
- Williams, David L.; De Kerbrech, R. P. (1982). Damned by Destiny. Brighton: Teredo Books. ISBN 978-0-90366209-3.
- Streater, Les. "NORMANDIE Vols 1–5: The complete history". marpubs.
- Boks, W. Holland (1935), photo of the model boat SS Normandie

Records
Preceded by Rex	Blue Riband (Westbound record-holder); 1935–1936	Succeeded by Queen Mary
Preceded by Bremen	Blue Riband (Eastbound record-holder); 1935–1936	Succeeded by Queen Mary
Preceded by Queen Mary	Blue Riband (Westbound record-holder); 1937–1938	Succeeded by Queen Mary
Preceded by Queen Mary	Blue Riband (Eastbound record-holder); 1937–1938	Succeeded by Queen Mary
Preceded by Rex	Holder of the Hales Trophy; 1935–1952	Succeeded by United States
