= 1963–64 European Cup Winners' Cup =

Tournament details
- Dates: 24 September 1963 – 15 May 1964
- Teams: 29 (from 28 associations)

Final positions
- Champions: (Portugal) Sporting CP (1st title)
- Runners-up: (Hungary) MTK Budapest

Tournament statistics
- Matches played: 62
- Goals scored: 202 (3.26 per match)
- Attendance: 1,246,563 (20,106 per match)
- Top scorer(s): Domingos Mascarenhas (Sporting CP); 11 goals

The 1963–64 season of the European Cup Winners' Cup club football tournament was won by Sporting CP in a replayed final victory against MTK Budapest. Tottenham Hotspur were the defending champions but they were eliminated by fellow English club Manchester United in the second round

== Teams ==
(Austria) LASK (CR)	(Bulgaria) Slavia Sofia (CW)	(Cyprus) APOEL (CW)	(Czechoslovakia) Slovan Bratislava (CW)
(Denmark) B 1913 (CW)	(England) Manchester United (CW)	(England) Tottenham Hotspur (2nd)^{TH}	(Finland) HPS (CW)
(France) Lyon (CR)	(East Germany) Motor Zwickau (CW)	(West Germany) Hamburger SV (CW)	(Greece) Olympiacos (CW)
(Hungary) MTK Budapest (2nd)	(Republic of Ireland) Shelbourne (CW)	(Italy) Atalanta (CW)	US Luxembourg (CW)
(Malta) Sliema Wanderers (CW)	(Netherlands) Willem II (CW)	(Northern Ireland) Linfield (CW)	(Norway) Gjøvik-Lyn (CW)
(Poland) Zagłębie Sosnowiec (CW)	(Portugal) Sporting CP (CW)	(Romania) Petrolul Ploieşti (CW)	(Scotland) Celtic (CR)
(Spain) Barcelona (CW)	(Switzerland) Basel (CW)	(Turkey) Fenerbahçe (CR)	(Wales) Borough United (CW)
(Socialist Federal Republic of Yugoslavia) Dinamo Zagreb (CW)

== Bracket ==
First round
(Republic of Ireland) Shelbourne	0	1	1
(Spain) Barcelona	2	3	5
(West Germany) Hamburger SV	4	3	7
US Luxembourg	0	2	2
(France) Lyon	3	3	6
(Denmark) B 1913	1	1	2
(Greece) Olympiacos	2	0	2 (2)
(Poland) Zagłębie Sosnowiec	1	1	2 (0)
(Netherlands) Willem II	1	1	2
(England) Manchester United	1	6	7
(Italy) Atalanta	2	1	3 (1)
(Portugal) Sporting CP	0	3	3 (3)
(Cyprus) APOEL	6	1	7
(Norway) Gjøvik-Lyn	0	0	0
(Switzerland) Basel	1	0	1
(Scotland) Celtic	5	5	10
(Austria) LASK	1	0	1 (1)
(Socialist Federal Republic of Yugoslavia) Dinamo Zagreb (c.t.)	0	1	1 (1)
(Malta) Sliema Wanderers	0	0	0
(Wales) Borough United	0	2	2
(Finland) HPS	1	1	2
(Czechoslovakia) Slovan Bratislava	4	8	12
(Hungary) MTK Budapest	1	1	2
(Bulgaria) Slavia Sofia	0	1	1
(Turkey) Fenerbahçe	4	0	4
(Romania) Petrolul Ploieşti	1	1	2

Second round
(Spain) Barcelona	4	0	4 (2)
(West Germany) Hamburger SV	4	0	4 (3)
(France) Lyon	4	1	5
(Greece) Olympiacos	1	2	3
(England) Tottenham Hotspur	2	1	3
(England) Manchester United	0	4	4
(Portugal) Sporting CP	16	2	18
(Cyprus) APOEL	1	0	1
(Scotland) Celtic	3	1	4
(Socialist Federal Republic of Yugoslavia) Dinamo Zagreb	0	2	2
(Wales) Borough United	0	0	0
(Czechoslovakia) Slovan Bratislava	1	3	4
(East Germany) Motor Zwickau	1	0	1
(Hungary) MTK Budapest	0	2	2
(Turkey) Fenerbahçe	4	0	4
(Northern Ireland) Linfield	1	2	3

Quarter-finals
(West Germany) Hamburger SV	1	0	1
(France) Lyon	1	2	3
(England) Manchester United	4	0	4
(Portugal) Sporting CP	1	5	6
(Scotland) Celtic	1	0	2
(Czechoslovakia) Slovan Bratislava	1	0	0
(Hungary) MTK Budapest	2	1	3 (1)
(Turkey) Fenerbahçe	0	3	3 (0)

Semi-finals
(France) Lyon	0	1	1 (0)
(Portugal) Sporting CP	0	1	1 (1)
(Scotland) Celtic	3	0	3
(Hungary) MTK Budapest	0	4	4

Final
(Portugal) Sporting CP	3/1
(Hungary) MTK Budapest	3/0

== First round ==
Team 1	Agg.	Team 2	1st leg	2nd leg
Shelbourne (Republic of Ireland)	1–5	(Spain) Barcelona	0–2	1–3
Hamburger SV (West Germany)	7–2	US Luxembourg	4–0	3–2
Lyon (France)	6–2	(Denmark) B 1913	3–1	3–1
Olympiacos (Greece)	2–2^{1}	(Poland) Zagłębie Sosnowiec	2–1	0–1
Willem II (Netherlands)	2–7	(England) Manchester United	1–1	1–6
Atalanta (Italy)	3–3^{2}	(Portugal) Sporting CP	2–0	1–3
APOEL (Cyprus)	7–0	(Norway) Gjøvik-Lyn	6–0	1–0
Basel (Switzerland)	1–10	(Scotland) Celtic	1–5	0–5
LASK (Austria)	1–1^{3}	(Socialist Federal Republic of Yugoslavia) Dinamo Zagreb	1–0	0–1
Sliema Wanderers (Malta)	0–2	(Wales) Borough United	0–0	0–2
HPS (Finland)	2–12	(Czechoslovakia) Slovan Bratislava	1–4	1–8
MTK Budapest (Hungary)	2–1	(Bulgaria) Slavia Sofia	1–0	1–1
Fenerbahçe (Turkey)	4–2	(Romania) Petrolul Ploieşti	4–1	0–1

Bye: (England) Tottenham Hotspur, (East Germany) Motor Zwickau, (Northern Ireland) Linfield

^{1} Olympiacos beat Zagłębie Sosnowiec 2–0 in a play-off to qualify for the second round.

^{2} Sporting CP beat Atalanta 3–1 after extra time in a play-off to qualify for the second round.

^{3} Dinamo Zagreb played LASK in play-off that finished 1–1. Dinamo Zagreb won a coin toss to qualify for the second round.

=== First leg ===
24 September 1963

Shelbourne (Republic of Ireland)	0–2	(Spain) Barcelona
	Report	Zaldúa 45'; Pereda 77'

Dalymount Park, Dublin
Attendance: 19,493
Referee: Leopold Sylvain Horn (Netherlands)

25 September 1963

Hamburger SV (West Germany)	4–0	US Luxembourg
Boyens 28', 32', 63'; Seeler 38'	Report

Volksparkstadion, Hamburg
Attendance: 17,935
Referee: Alois Obtulovič (Czechoslovakia)

9 October 1963

Lyon (France)	3–1	(Denmark) B 1913
Combin 10'; Di Nallo 14'; Taberner 55'	Report	Rasmussen 44'

Stade de Gerland, Lyon
Attendance: 9,870
Referee: Joseph Heymann (Switzerland)

25 September 1963

Olympiacos (Greece)	2–1	(Poland) Zagłębie Sosnowiec
Sideris 47', 63'	Report	Piecyk 88'

Nea Filadelfeia Stadium, Athens
Attendance: 15,443
Referee: Joseph Heymann (Switzerland)

25 September 1963

Willem II (Netherlands)	1–1	(England) Manchester United
Louer 9'	Report	Herd 11'

De Kuip, Rotterdam
Attendance: 15,989
Referee: Jean Tricot (France)

4 September 1963

Atalanta (Italy)	2–0	(Portugal) Sporting CP
Calvanese 74'; Domenghini 86'	Report

Stadio Comunale, Bergamo
Attendance: 8,548
Referee: Josef Stoll (Austria)

8 September 1963

APOEL (Cyprus)	6–0	(Norway) Gjøvik-Lyn
Chailis 15', 61', 80'; Agathokleous 67'; Papallos 78'; Kantzilieris 86'	Report

Makario Stadium, Nicosia
Attendance: 7,100
Referee: Cezmi Başar (Turkey)

17 September 1963

Basel (Switzerland)	1–5	(Scotland) Celtic
Blumer 78'	Report	Divers 21'; Hughes 43', 65', 77'; Lennox 53'

Sankt Jakob Stadion, Basel
Attendance: 14,300
Referee: Manuel Gómez Arribas (Spain)

9 October 1963

LASK (Austria)	1–0	(Socialist Federal Republic of Yugoslavia) Dinamo Zagreb
Fürst 32'	Report

Linzer Stadion, Linz
Attendance: 5,410
Referee: István Zsolt (Hungary)

15 September 1963

Sliema Wanderers (Malta)	0–0	(Wales) Borough United
	Report

The Empire Stadium, La Valletta
Attendance: 9,786
Referee: Antonio Sbardella (Italy)

15 September 1963

HPS (Finland)	1–4	(Czechoslovakia) Slovan Bratislava
Rautiainen 72'	Report	Molnár 8'; Obert 15', 19'; Velecký 52'

Töölön Pallokenttä, Helsinki
Attendance: 2,934
Referee: Rudi Glöckner (East Germany)

2 October 1963

MTK Budapest (Hungary)	1–0	(Bulgaria) Slavia Sofia
Sándor 8'	Report

Hungaria Körut, Budapest
Attendance: 37,028
Referee: Eduard Babouczek (Austria)

12 September 1963

Fenerbahçe (Turkey)	4–1	(Romania) Petrolul Ploieşti
Birol 55'; Selim 56'; Şenol 68'; Nedim 70'	Report	Dridea 74'

Mithat Paşa Stadium, Istanbul
Attendance: 23,004
Referee: Petros Tsouvaras (Greece)

=== Second leg ===
15 October 1963

Barcelona (Spain)	3–1	(Republic of Ireland) Shelbourne
Kocsis 36'; Fusté 77'; Ré 80'	Report	Bonham 29' (pen.)

Camp Nou, Barcelona
Attendance: 18,694
Referee: Concetto Lo Bello (Italy)

Barcelona won 5–1 on aggregate.

2 October 1963

US Luxembourg	2–3	(West Germany) Hamburger SV
Winandy 70'; Bernardin 88'	Report	Giesemann 20', 62'; Kurbjuhn 83'

Stade Municipal, Luxembourg
Attendance: 7,939
Referee: Pieter Roomer (Netherlands)

Hamburger SV won 7–2 on aggregate.

16 October 1963

B 1913 (Denmark)	1–3	(France) Lyon
Grønning 10'	Report	Di Nallo 15'; Combin 20', 87'

Odense Stadion, Odense
Attendance: 9,938
Referee: William Clements (England)

Lyon won 6–2 on aggregate.

2 October 1963

Zagłębie Sosnowiec (Poland)	1–0	(Greece) Olympiacos
Krawiarz 41'	Report

Stadion Ludowy, Sosnowiec
Attendance: 20,479
Referee: Johannes Malka (West Germany)

2–2 on aggregate.

15 October 1963

Manchester United (England)	6–1	(Netherlands) Willem II
Setters 6'; Law 13', 32', 69'; Charlton 64'; Herd 80'	Report	Cantwell 36' (o.g.)

Old Trafford, Manchester
Attendance: 42,672
Referee: Henri Faucheux (France)

Manchester United won 7–2 on aggregate.

9 October 1963

Sporting CP (Portugal)	3–1	(Italy) Atalanta
Figueiredo 5'; Mascarenhas 63'; Bé 77'	Report	Christensen 18'

Estádio José Alvalade, Lisbon
Attendance: 37,943
Referee: Dittmar Huber (Switzerland)

3–3 on aggregate.

29 September 1963

Gjøvik-Lyn (Norway)	0–1	(Cyprus) APOEL
	Report	Partakis 48' (pen.)

Gjøvik Stadion, Gjøvik
Attendance: 5,756
Referee: Gunnar Michaelsen (Denmark)

APOEL won 7–0 on aggregate.

9 October 1963

Celtic (Scotland)	5–0	(Switzerland) Basel
Johnstone 3'; Divers 42', 88'; Murdoch 62'; Chalmers 78'	Report

Celtic Park, Glasgow
Attendance: 7,909
Referee: Frede Hansen (Denmark)

Celtic won 10–1 on aggregate.

16 October 1963

Dinamo Zagreb (Socialist Federal Republic of Yugoslavia)	1–0	(Austria) LASK
Lamza 48'	Report

Stadion Maksimir, Zagreb
Attendance: 6,030
Referee: Bela Balla (Hungary)

1–1 on aggregate.

3 October 1963

Borough United (Wales)	2–0	(Malta) Sliema Wanderers
Gerry Duffy 35'; Pritchard 57'	Report

Racecourse Ground, Wrexham
Attendance: 17,910
Referee: Gerhard Schulenburg (West Germany)

Borough United won 2–0 on aggregate.

19 October 1963

Slovan Bratislava (Czechoslovakia)	8–1	(Finland) HPS
Obert 20', 81'; Moravčík 55', 57'; Velecký 65', 76'; Cvetler 62'; Hrdlička 70'	Report	Raatikainen 84'

Tehelné pole, Bratislava
Attendance: 5,119
Referee: Józef Kowal (Poland)

Slovan Bratislava won 12–2 on aggregate.

9 October 1963

Slavia Sofia (Bulgaria)	1–1	(Hungary) MTK Budapest
Mishev 4'	Report	Kuti 35'

Vasil Levski Stadium, Sofia
Attendance: 13,942
Referee: Božidar Gugić (Yugoslavia)

MTK Budapest won 6–2 on aggregate.

16 October 1963

Petrolul Ploieşti (Romania)	1–0	(Turkey) Fenerbahçe
Dridea 14'	Report

Stadionul Petrolul, Ploieşti
Attendance: 13,846
Referee: Giannis Michailidis (Greece)

Fenerbahçe won 4–2 on aggregate.

=== Play-off ===
23 October 1963

Olympiacos (Greece)	2–0	(Poland) Zagłębie Sosnowiec
Sideris 38'; Tzinis 52'	Report

Praterstadion, Vienna
Attendance: 3,111
Referee: Josef Stoll (Austria)

14 October 1963

Sporting CP (Portugal)	3–1 (a.e.t.)	(Italy) Atalanta
Mascarenhas 24', 116'; Lúcio 96'	Report	Nova 21'

Estadi de Sarrià, Barcelona
Attendance: 4,860
Referee: Manuel Gómez Arribas (Spain)

23 October 1963

LASK (Austria)	1–1 (coin toss) (a.e.t.)	(Socialist Federal Republic of Yugoslavia) Dinamo Zagreb
Nemeth 49'	Report	Raus 38'

Linzer Stadion, Linz
Attendance: 11,212
Referee: Albert Guinnard (Switzerland)

1–1 in play-off match. Dinamo Zagreb qualified on a coin toss.

== Second round ==
Team 1	Agg.	Team 2	1st leg	2nd leg
Barcelona (Spain)	4–4^{1}	(West Germany) Hamburger SV	4–4	0–0
Lyon (France)	5–3	(Greece) Olympiacos	4–1	1–2
Tottenham Hotspur (England)	3–4	(England) Manchester United	2–0	1–4
Sporting CP (Portugal)	18–1	(Cyprus) APOEL	16–1	2–0
Celtic (Scotland)	4–2	(Socialist Federal Republic of Yugoslavia) Dinamo Zagreb	3–0	1–2
Borough United (Wales)	0–4	(Czechoslovakia) Slovan Bratislava	0–1	0–3
Motor Zwickau (East Germany)	1–2	(Hungary) MTK Budapest	1–0	0–2
Fenerbahçe (Turkey)	4–3	(Northern Ireland) Linfield	4–1	0–2

^{1} Hamburger SV beat Barcelona 3–2 in a play-off to qualify for the quarter-finals.

=== First leg ===
20 November 1963

Barcelona (Spain)	4–4	(Germany) Hamburger SV
Pereda 24'; Fusté 38' (pen.), 76'; Zaballa 56'	Report	Seeler 18', 72'; Dörfel 32'; Eladio 60' (o.g.)

Camp Nou, Barcelona
Attendance: 49,942
Referee: Gennaro Marchese (Italy)

20 November 1963

Lyon (France)	4–1	(Greece) Olympiacos
Combin 19', 33', 54' (pen.); Leborgne 89'	Report	Papazoglou 22'

Stade de Gerland, Lyon
Attendance: 10,244
Referee: Günther Baumgärtel (West Germany)

3 December 1963

Tottenham Hotspur (England)	2–0	(England) Manchester United
Mackay 67'; Dyson 88'	Report

White Hart Lane, London
Attendance: 57,447
Referee: Hugh Phillips (Scotland)

13 November 1963

Sporting CP (Portugal)	16–1	(Cyprus) APOEL
Mascarenhas 5', 20', 27', 51', 84', 88'; Figueiredo 67', 72', 76'; Pinto 7', 65'; Augusto Martins 64', 81'; Lino 35'; Louro 36'; Pérides 48'	Report	Andreou 24'

Estádio José Alvalade, Lisbon
Attendance: 5,111
Referee: James Finney (England)

4 December 1963

Celtic (Scotland)	3–0	(Socialist Federal Republic of Yugoslavia) Dinamo Zagreb
Chalmers 10', 13'; Hughes 62'	Report

Celtic Park, Glasgow
Attendance: 41,189
Referee: Pieter Roomer (Netherlands)

11 December 1963

Borough United (Wales)	0–1	(Czech Republic) Slovan Bratislava
	Report	Molnár 52'

Racecourse Ground, Wrexham
Attendance: 10,115
Referee: Henri Faucheux (France)

20 November 1963

Motor Zwickau (East Germany)	1–0	(Hungary) MTK Budapest
Jakob 51'	Report

Georgi-Dimitroff-Stadion, Zwickau
Attendance: 8,597
Referee: Aleksandar Škorić (Yugoslavia)

13 November 1963

Fenerbahçe (Turkey)	4–1	(Northern Ireland) Linfield
Ogün 4'; Şenol 34', 52', 76'	Report	Dickson 85'

Mithat Paşa Stadium, Istanbul
Attendance: 27,921
Referee: Paul Bonett (Malta)

=== Second leg ===
11 December 1963

Hamburger SV (Germany)	0–0	(Spain) Barcelona
	Report

Volksparkstadion, Hamburg
Attendance: 62,035
Referee: Dittmar Huber (SUI)

4–4 on aggregate.

4 December 1963

Olympiacos (Greece)	2–1	(France) Lyon
Sideris 17'; Kyprianidis 58'	Report	Combin 90'

Nea Filadelfeia Stadium, Athens
Attendance: 33,060
Referee: Atanas Stavrev (Bulgaria)

Lyon won 5–3 on aggregate.

10 December 1963

Manchester United (England)	4–1	(England) Tottenham Hotspur
Herd 7', 53'; Charlton 77', 88'	Report	Greaves 54'

Old Trafford, Manchester
Attendance: 48,639
Referee: Leo Callaghan (Wales)

Manchester United won 4–3 on aggregate.

20 November 1963

APOEL (Cyprus)	0–2	(Portugal) Sporting CP
	Report	Augusto Martins 37'; Mascarenhas 54'

Estádio José Alvalade, Lisbon
Attendance: 8,534
Referee: Daniel María Zariauiegui Izco (Spain)

Sporting CP won 18–1 on aggregate.

11 December 1963

Dinamo Zagreb (Socialist Federal Republic of Yugoslavia)	2–1	(Scotland) Celtic
Lamza 64'; Zambata 85'	Report	Murdoch 42'

Stadion Maksimir, Zagreb
Attendance: 6,490
Referee: Lajos Horvath (Hungary)

Celtic won 4–2 on aggregate.

15 December 1963

Slovan Bratislava (Czech Republic)	3–0	(Wales) Borough United
Molnár 52', 58'; Moravčík 73'	Report

Tehelné pole, Bratislava
Attendance: 3,653
Referee: Marian Koczner (Poland)

Slovan Bratislava won 4–0 on aggregate.

30 November 1963

MTK Budapest (Hungary)	2–0	(East Germany) Motor Zwickau
Kovács 61' (pen.); Bödör 71'	Report

Hungaria Körut, Budapest
Attendance: 3,565
Referee: Martti Hirviniemi (Finland)

MTK Budapest won 2–1 on aggregate.

11 December 1963

Linfield (Northern Ireland)	2–0	(Turkey) Fenerbahçe
Craig 13'; Ferguson 83'	Report

Windsor Park, Belfast
Attendance: 7,863
Referee: Erling Rolf Olsen (Denmark)

Feberbahçe won 4–3 on aggregate.

=== Play-off ===
18 December 1963

Hamburger SV (Germany)	3–2	(Spain) Barcelona
Bähre 51'; Seeler 65', 82'	Report	Kocsis 61', 63'

Stade Olympique de la Pontaise, Lausanne
Attendance: 14,759
Referee: Daniel Mellet (Switzerland)

== Quarter-finals ==
Team 1	Agg.	Team 2	1st leg	2nd leg
Hamburger SV (West Germany)	1–3	(France) Lyon	1–1	0–2
Manchester United (England)	4–6	(Portugal) Sporting CP	4–1	0–5
Celtic (Scotland)	2–0	(Czechoslovakia) Slovan Bratislava	1–0	1–0
MTK Budapest (Hungary)	3–3^{1}	(Turkey) Fenerbahçe	2–0	1–3

^{1} MTK Budapest beat Fenerbahçe 1–0 in a play-off to qualify for the semi-finals.

=== First leg ===
4 March 1964

Hamburger SV (Germany)	1–1	(France) Lyon
Dörfel 17'	Report	Mignot 10'

Volksparkstadion, Hamburg
Attendance: 35,018
Referee: Cesare Jonni (Italy)

26 February 1964

Manchester United (England)	4–1	(Portugal) Sporting CP
Law 22', 60', 72'; Charlton 38'	Report	Osvaldo 65'

Old Trafford, Manchester
Attendance: 60,207
Referee: Johan Martens (Netherlands)

26 February 1964

Celtic (Scotland)	1–0	(Czech Republic) Slovan Bratislava
Murdoch 71' (pen.)	Report

Celtic Park, Glasgow
Attendance: 51,865
Referee: Hubert Burguet (Belgium)

27 February 1964

MTK Budapest (Hungary)	2–0	(Turkey) Fenerbahçe
Vasas 77' (pen.); Bödör 81'	Report

Hungaria Körut, Budapest
Attendance: 13,697
Referee: Eduard Babouczek (Austria)

=== Second leg ===
18 March 1964

Lyon (France)	2–0	(Germany) Hamburger SV
Combin 15', 62'	Report

Stade de Gerland, Lyon
Attendance: 26,805
Referee: Daniel Mellet (Switzerland)

Lyon won 3–1 on aggregate.

18 March 1964

Sporting CP (Portugal)	5–0	(England) Manchester United
Osvaldo 3', 12', 54'; Geo 47'; Morais 52'	Report

Estádio José Alvalade, Lisbon
Attendance: 29,187
Referee: Michel Kitabdjian (France)

Sporting CP won 6–4 on aggregate.

4 March 1964

Slovan Bratislava (Czech Republic)	0–1	(Scotland) Celtic
	Report	Hughes 85'

Tehelné pole, Bratislava
Attendance: 17,893
Referee: Werner Treichel (West Germany)

Celtic won 2–0 on aggregate.

6 March 1964

Fenerbahçe (Turkey)	3–1	(Hungary) MTK Budapest
Ogün 6', 75'; Selim 66'	Report	Bödör 80'

Mithat Paşa Stadium, Istanbul
Attendance: 30,283
Referee: Konstantin Zečević (Yugoslavia)

3–3 on aggregate.

=== Play-off ===
18 March 1964

MTK Budapest (Hungary)	1–0	(Turkey) Fenerbahçe
Kuti 86'	Report

Stadio Flaminio, Rome
Attendance: 700
Referee: Cesare Jonni (Italy)

== Semi-finals ==
Team 1	Agg.	Team 2	1st leg	2nd leg
Lyon (France)	1–1^{1}	(Portugal) Sporting CP	0–0	1–1
Celtic (Scotland)	3–4	(Hungary) MTK Budapest	3–0	0–4

^{1} Sporting CP beat Lyon 1–0 in a play-off to qualify for the final.

=== First leg ===
8 April 1964

Lyon (France)	0–0	(Portugal) Sporting CP
	Report

Stade de Gerland, Lyon
Attendance: 28,053
Referee: Pieter Roomer (Netherlands)

15 April 1964

Celtic (Scotland)	3–0	(Hungary) MTK Budapest
Johnstone 41'; Chalmers 65', 76'	Report

Celtic Park, Glasgow
Attendance: 50,810
Referee: Giulio Campanati (Italy)

=== Second leg ===
21 April 1964

Sporting CP (Portugal)	1–1	(France) Lyon
Géo 48' (pen.)	Report	Combin 13'

Estádio José Alvalade, Lisbon
Attendance: 40,749
Referee: Kurt Tschenscher (West Germany)

1–1 on aggregate.

29 April 1964

MTK Budapest (Hungary)	4–0	(Scotland) Celtic
Kuti 12', 82'; Vasas 47' (pen.); Sándor 62'	Report

Népstadion, Budapest
Attendance: 10,800
Referee: Dimitris Wlachojanis (Austria)

MTK Budapest won 4–3 on aggregate.

=== Play-off ===
5 May 1964

Sporting CP (Portugal)	1–0	(France) Lyon
Osvaldo 64'	Report

Estadio Metropolitano de Madrid, Madrid
Attendance: 20,000
Referee: José González Echeverría (Spain)

== Final ==
13 May 1964
19:30

Sporting CP (Portugal)	3–3 (a.e.t.)	(Hungary) MTK Budapest
Mascarenhas 40'; Figueiredo 45', 80'	Report	Sándor 19', 75'; Kuti 73'

Heysel Stadium, Brussels
Attendance: 3,208
Referee: Lucien van Nuffel (Belgium)

=== Replay ===
15 May 1964
19:30

Sporting CP (Portugal)	1–0	(Hungary) MTK Budapest
Morais 20'	Report

Bosuil Stadium, Antwerp
Attendance: 13,924
Referee: Gérard Versyp (Belgium)

== Top scorers ==
The top scorers from the 1963–64 European Cup Winners' Cup (including preliminary round) are as follows:

Rank	Name	Team	Goals
1	(Portugal) Domingos Mascarenhas	(Portugal) Sporting CP	11
2	(France) Nestor Combin	(France) Lyon	10
3	(Portugal) Ernesto Figueiredo	(Portugal) Sporting CP	6
3	(Scotland) Denis Law	(England) Manchester United	6
5	(Scotland) Stevie Chalmers	(Scotland) Celtic	5
5	(Scotland) John Hughes	(Scotland) Celtic	5
5	(Hungary) István Kuti	(Hungary) MTK Budapest	5
5	(Brazil) Osvaldo	(Portugal) Sporting CP	5
5	(West Germany) Uwe Seeler	(West Germany) Hamburger SV	5

== See also ==
- 1963–64 European Cup
- 1963–64 Inter-Cities Fairs Cup
