= UEFA Cup Winners' Cup records and statistics =

Football tournament statistics

Below are tables of the clubs that have won the Cup Winners' Cup.

== Performances ==
=== By club ===
Performance in the UEFA Cup Winners' Cup by club
Club	Titles	Runners-up	Years won	Years runner-up
(Spain) Barcelona	4	2	1979, 1982, 1989, 1997	1969, 1991
(Belgium) Anderlecht	2	2	1976, 1978	1977, 1990
(Italy) Milan	2	1	1968, 1973	1974
(England) Chelsea	2	0	1971, 1998	–
(Soviet Union) Dynamo Kyiv	2	0	1975, 1986	–
(Spain) Atlético Madrid	1	2	1962	1963, 1986
(Scotland) Rangers	1	2	1972	1961, 1967
(England) Arsenal	1	2	1994	1980, 1995
(Italy) Fiorentina	1	1	1961	1962
(England) West Ham United	1	1	1965	1976
(West Germany) Hamburger SV	1	1	1977	1968
(Netherlands) Ajax	1	1	1987	1988
(Italy) Sampdoria	1	1	1990	1989
(Italy) Parma	1	1	1993	1994
(France) Paris Saint-Germain	1	1	1996	1997
(England) Tottenham Hotspur	1	0	1963	–
(Portugal) Sporting CP	1	0	1964	–
(West Germany) Borussia Dortmund	1	0	1966	–
(West Germany) Bayern Munich	1	0	1967	–
(Czechoslovakia) Slovan Bratislava	1	0	1969	–
(England) Manchester City	1	0	1970	–
(East Germany) 1. FC Magdeburg	1	0	1974	–
(Spain) Valencia	1	0	1980	–
(Soviet Union) Dinamo Tbilisi	1	0	1981	–
(Scotland) Aberdeen	1	0	1983	–
(Italy) Juventus	1	0	1984	–
(England) Everton	1	0	1985	–
(Belgium) KV Mechelen	1	0	1988	–
(England) Manchester United	1	0	1991	–
(Germany) Werder Bremen	1	0	1992	–
(Spain) Zaragoza	1	0	1995	–
(Italy) Lazio	1	0	1999	–
(Spain) Real Madrid	0	2	–	1971, 1983
(Austria) Rapid Wien	0	2	–	1985, 1996
(Hungary) MTK Budapest	0	1	–	1964
(West Germany) 1860 Munich	0	1	–	1965
(England) Liverpool	0	1	–	1966
(Poland) Górnik Zabrze	0	1	–	1970
(Soviet Union) Dynamo Moscow	0	1	–	1972
(England) Leeds United	0	1	–	1973
(Hungary) Ferencváros	0	1	–	1975
Austria Wien	0	1	–	1978
(West Germany) Fortuna Düsseldorf	0	1	–	1979
(East Germany) Carl Zeiss Jena	0	1	–	1981
(Belgium) Standard Liège	0	1	–	1982
(Portugal) Porto	0	1	–	1984
(East Germany) Lokomotive Leipzig	0	1	–	1987
(France) Monaco	0	1	–	1992
(Belgium) Antwerp	0	1	–	1993
(Germany) VfB Stuttgart	0	1	–	1998
(Spain) Mallorca	0	1	–	1999

=== By nation ===
Nation	Titles	Runners-up	Winning clubs (titles)
England	8	5	Chelsea (2), Arsenal (1), Everton (1), Manchester City (1), Manchester United (1), Tottenham Hotspur (1), West Ham United (1)
Spain	7	7	Barcelona (4), Atlético Madrid (1), Zaragoza (1), Valencia (1)
Italy	7	4	Milan (2), Fiorentina (1), Juventus (1), Lazio (1), Parma (1), Sampdoria (1)
Germany	5	6	Bayern Munich (1), Borussia Dortmund (1), Hamburger SV (1), Werder Bremen (1), 1. FC Magdeburg (1)
Belgium	3	4	Anderlecht (2), KV Mechelen (1)
Soviet Union	3	1	Dynamo Kyiv (2), Dinamo Tbilisi (1)
Scotland	2	2	Aberdeen (1), Rangers (1)
France	1	2	Paris Saint-Germain (1)
Netherlands	1	1	Ajax (1)
Portugal	1	1	Sporting CP (1)
Czechoslovakia	1	0	Slovan Bratislava (1)
Austria	0	3	–
Hungary	0	2	–
Poland	0	1	–

=== By manager ===
- Four managers hold the record of winning the competition on two occasions:
  - Nereo Rocco: 1968 and 1973 (Milan)
  - Valeriy Lobanovskyi in 1975 and 1986 (Dynamo Kyiv)
  - Johan Cruyff: 1987 (Ajax) and 1989 (Barcelona)
  - Alex Ferguson: 1983 (Aberdeen) and 1991 (Manchester United)

=== By player ===
- Most UEFA Cup Winners' Cup titles: Lobo Carrasco (3)
  - Barcelona (3): (1978–79, 1981–82, 1988–89)

== Clubs ==
=== By number of appearances ===
Club	No.	Years
(Wales) Cardiff City	14	1965, 1966, 1968, 1969, 1970, 1971, 1972, 1974, 1975, 1977, 1978, 1989, 1993, 1994
(Spain) Barcelona	13	1964, 1969, 1972, **1979**, 1980, **1982**, 1983, 1984, 1985, **1989**, 1990, 1991, **1997**
(Romania) Steaua București	11	1963, 1965, 1967, 1968, 1970, 1971, 1972, 1980, 1985, 1991, 1993
(Bulgaria) Levski / Levski-Spartak / Vitosha Sofia	11	1968, 1970, 1972, 1977, 1987, 1988, 1992, 1993, 1997, 1998, 1999
(Scotland) Rangers	10	1961, 1963, 1967, 1970, **1972**, 1974, 1978, 1980, 1982, 1984
(Malta) Floriana	10	1962, 1966, 1967, 1968, 1973, 1977, 1979, 1982, 1989, 1995
(Austria) Rapid Wien	10	1962, 1967, 1970, 1973, 1974, 1977, 1985, 1986, 1987, 1996
(Cyprus) APOEL	10	1964, 1969, 1970, 1977, 1979, 1980, 1985, 1994, 1996, 1998
(Socialist Federal Republic of Yugoslavia) / Dinamo / Croatia Zagreb	10	1961, 1964, 1965, 1966, 1970, 1974, 1981, 1984, 1995, 1998
Union Luxembourg	10	1964, 1965, 1970, 1971, 1979, 1985, 1987, 1990, 1997, 1998
(Spain) Atlético Madrid	9	**1962**, 1963, 1966, 1973, 1976, 1977, 1986, 1992, 1993
(Greece) Olympiacos	9	1962, 1964, 1966, 1969, 1970, 1972, 1987, 1991, 1993
(Malta) Sliema Wanderers	9	1964, 1969, 1970, 1975, 1980, 1983, 1988, 1991, 1994
(Poland) Legia Warsaw	9	1965, 1967, 1973, 1974, 1981, 1982, 1990, 1991, 1998
(Northern Ireland) Glentoran	9	1967, 1974, 1984, 1986, 1987, 1988, 1991, 1997, 1999
(Iceland) Fram	8	1972, 1975, 1981, 1982, 1986, 1987, 1989, 1991
(Scotland) Aberdeen	8	1968, 1971, 1979, **1983**, 1984, 1987, 1991, 1994
(Socialist Federal Republic of Yugoslavia) / (Croatia) Hajduk Split	8	1968, 1973, 1977, 1978, 1985, 1988, 1992, 1994
(Hungary) Ferencváros	8	1961, 1973, 1975, 1979, 1990, 1992, 1994, 1995
Austria Wien	8	1961, 1968, 1972, 1975, 1978, 1983, 1991, 1995
(Portugal) Porto	8	1965, 1969, 1978, 1982, 1984, 1985, 1992, 1995
(Scotland) Celtic	8	1964, 1966, 1976, 1981, 1985, 1986, 1990, 1996
(Portugal) Sporting CP	8	**1964**, 1965, 1972, 1973, 1974, 1979, 1988, 1996
(Wales) Wrexham	8	1973, 1976, 1979, 1980, 1985, 1987, 1991, 1996
(Turkey) Galatasaray	8	1965, 1966, 1967, 1977, 1983, 1986, 1992, 1997
(Switzerland) Sion	8	1966, 1975, 1981, 1983, 1987, 1992, 1996, 1997

(Years marked in bold denote Cups won by the respective club)

=== By semi-final appearances ===
Club	No.	Years
(Spain) Barcelona	6	**1969**, **1979**, **1982**, **1989**, **1991**, **1997**
(Spain) Atlético Madrid	5	**1962**, **1963**, 1977, **1986**, 1993
(England) Chelsea	4	**1971**, 1995, **1998**, 1999
(Belgium) Anderlecht	4	**1976**, **1977**, **1978**, **1990**
(West Germany) Bayern Munich	4	**1967**, 1968, 1972, 1985
(France) Paris Saint-Germain	3	1994, **1996**, **1997**
(Italy) Fiorentina	3	**1961**, **1962**, 1997
(Netherlands) Feyenoord	3	1981, 1992, 1996
(England) Arsenal	3	**1980, 1994**, **1995**
(Italy) Sampdoria	3	**1989**, **1990**, 1995
(Spain) Zaragoza	3	1965, 1987, **1995**
(Italy) Juventus	3	1980, **1984**, 1991
(Soviet Union) Dynamo Moscow	3	**1972**, 1978, 1985
(England) West Ham United	3	**1965**, 1966, **1976**
(Italy) Milan	3	**1968**, **1973**, **1974**
(Scotland) Rangers	3	**1961**, **1967**, **1972**
(Russia) Lokomotiv Moscow	2	1998, 1999
(England) Liverpool	2	**1966**, 1997
(Austria) Rapid Wien	2	**1985**, **1996**
(Italy) Parma	2	**1993**, **1994**
(Portugal) Benfica	2	1981, 1994
(France) Monaco	2	1990, **1992**
(England) Manchester United	2	1984, **1991**
(Belgium) KV Mechelen	2	**1988**, 1989
(Netherlands) Ajax	2	**1987**, **1988**
(Soviet Union) Dynamo Kyiv	2	**1975**, **1986**
(Scotland) Aberdeen	2	**1983**, 1984
Austria Wien	2	**1978**, 1983
(Spain) Real Madrid	2	**1971**, **1983**
(Soviet Union) Dinamo Tbilisi	2	**1981**, 1982
(Belgium) Standard Liège	2	1967, **1982**
(England) Tottenham Hotspur	2	**1963**, 1982
(East Germany) Carl Zeiss Jena	2	1962, **1981**
(West Germany) Hamburger SV	2	**1968**, **1977**
(Netherlands) PSV Eindhoven	2	1971, 1975
(Portugal) Sporting CP	2	**1964**, 1974
(England) Manchester City	2	**1970**, 1971
(Scotland) Celtic	2	1964, 1966
(Italy) Lazio	1	**1999**
(Spain) Mallorca	1	**1999**
(Germany) VfB Stuttgart	1	**1998**
(Italy) Vicenza	1	1998
(Spain) Deportivo La Coruña	1	1996
(Belgium) Antwerp	1	**1993**
(Russia) Spartak Moscow	1	1993
(Belgium) Club Brugge	1	1992
(Germany) Werder Bremen	1	**1992**
(Poland) Legia Warsaw	1	1991
(Romania) Dinamo București	1	1990
(Bulgaria) CSKA Sofia	1	1989
(Italy) Atalanta	1	1988
(France) Marseille	1	1988
(France) Bordeaux	1	1987
(East Germany) Lokomotive Leipzig	1	**1987**
(West Germany) Bayer Uerdingen	1	1986
(Czechoslovakia) Dukla Prague	1	1986
(England) Everton	1	**1985**
(Portugal) Porto	1	**1984**
(Belgium) Waterschei Thor	1	1983
(France) Nantes	1	1980
(Spain) Valencia	1	**1980**
(Czechoslovakia) Baník Ostrava	1	1979
(Belgium) Beveren	1	1979
(West Germany) Fortuna Düsseldorf	1	**1979**
(Netherlands) Twente	1	1978
(Italy) Napoli	1	1977
(East Germany) BSG Sachsenring Zwickau	1	1976
(West Germany) Eintracht Frankfurt	1	1976
(Hungary) Ferencváros	1	**1975**
(Socialist Federal Republic of Yugoslavia) Red Star Belgrade	1	1975
(West Germany) Borussia Mönchengladbach	1	1974
(East Germany) 1. FC Magdeburg	1	**1974**
(Socialist Federal Republic of Yugoslavia) Hajduk Split	1	1973
(England) Leeds United	1	**1973**
(Czechoslovakia) Sparta Prague	1	1973
(East Germany) Dynamo Berlin	1	1972
(Poland) Górnik Zabrze	1	**1970**
(Italy) Roma	1	1970
(West Germany) Schalke 04	1	1970
(West Germany) 1. FC Köln	1	1969
(Scotland) Dunfermline Athletic	1	1969
(Czechoslovakia) Slovan Bratislava	1	**1969**
(Wales) Cardiff City	1	1968
(Bulgaria) Slavia Sofia	1	1967
(West Germany) Borussia Dortmund	1	**1966**
(West Germany) 1860 Munich	1	**1965**
(Italy) Torino	1	1965
(France) Lyon	1	1964
(Hungary) MTK Budapest	1	**1964**
(West Germany) 1. FC Nürnberg	1	1963
(Socialist Federal Republic of Yugoslavia) OFK Beograd	1	1963
(Hungary) Újpest	1	1962
(Socialist Federal Republic of Yugoslavia) Dinamo Zagreb	1	1961
(England) Wolverhampton Wanderers	1	1961

Club in **bold**	=	Finalist club that season

== Trivia and records ==
- For the 1994–95 season, England had two representatives in the tournament, neither of which were the domestic cup winners. The first was Arsenal, who were the Cup Winners' Cup holders, and the second was Chelsea, who had lost the 1994 FA Cup final to double winners Manchester United, who had qualified for the 1994–95 UEFA Champions League. Both Arsenal and Chelsea were eliminated from the competition by eventual winners Zaragoza of Spain.
- For the 1996–97 season, the same situation happened for France. The first was Paris Saint-Germain FC, who were the trophy holders, and the second was Nîmes Olympique, who had lost the Coupe de France final against AJ Auxerre, who had qualified for the 1996–97 UEFA Champions League.
- Largest margin of victory in a final: 1962–63, Tottenham Hotspur 5–1 Atlético Madrid
- Most goals in a final: 1978–79, Barcelona 4–3 Fortuna Düsseldorf
- Most goals in a match: 1963–64, Sporting CP 16–1 APOEL (European Cups record)

=== Consecutive participations ===
It was uncommon for clubs to participate in more than two consecutive Cup Winners' Cups, but the following clubs did so.

5 seasons

- (Wales) Cardiff City (1967–68 to 1971–72)
- (Finland) Lahti (1973–74 to 1977–78)

4 seasons

- (Republic of Ireland) Shamrock Rovers (1966–67 to 1969–70)
- (Belgium) Anderlecht (1975–76 to 1978–79)
- (Spain) Barcelona (1981–82 to 1984–85)
- (Romania) Dinamo București (1986–87 to 1989–90)
- (Georgia (country)) Dinamo Batumi (1995–96 to 1998–99) (Note: Dinamo Batumi and Lokomotiv Moscow had their consecutive participation streak ended due to the discontinuation of the competition in 1999. After this, Lokomotiv Moscow qualified for the 1999–2000 UEFA Cup, while Dinamo Batumi did not.)

3 seasons

- (Greece) Olympiacos (1961–62 to 1963–64) (Note: Withdrew from 1962–63 competition)
- (Socialist Federal Republic of Yugoslavia) Dinamo Zagreb (1963–64 to 1965–66)
- (Turkey) Galatasaray (1965–65 to 1966–67)
- (Malta) Floriana (1965–66 to 1967–68)
- (Belgium) Standard Liège (1965–66 to 1967–68)
- (Hungary) Rába ETO Győr (1966–67 to 1968–69)
- (Bulgaria) Levski-Spartak Sofia (1967–68 to 1969–70)
- (Poland) Górnik Zabrze (1968–69 to 1970–71)
- (Romania) Steaua București (1969–70 to 1971–72)
- (Portugal) Sporting CP (1971–72 to 1973–74)
- (Greece) PAOK (1972–73 to 1974–75)
- (West Germany) Fortuna Düsseldorf (1978–79 to 1980–81)
- (Wales) Swansea City (1981–82 to 1983–84)
- (Austria) Rapid Wien (1984–85 to 1986–87)
- (Northern Ireland) Glentoran (1985–86 to 1987–88)
- (Spain) Barcelona (1988–89 to 1990–91)
- (Italy) Sampdoria (1988–89 to 1990–91)
- (Iceland) Valur (1991–92 to 1993–94)
- (Lithuania) Žalgiris (1993–94 to 1995–96)
- (Greece) AEK Athens (1995–96 to 1997–98)
- (Russia) Lokomotiv Moscow (1996–97 to 1998–99)

=== Domestic champions ===
Five clubs won their domestic leagues and the Cup Winners' Cup in the same season.

- (Soviet Union) Dynamo Kyiv: 1975, 1986
- (Italy) Milan: 1968
- (East Germany) Magdeburg: 1974
- (Italy) Juventus: 1984
- (England) Everton: 1985

=== Undefeated champions ===
- (Spain) Atlético Madrid (1962)
- (Italy) Milan (1968 & 1973)
- (Italy) Juventus (1984)
- (England) Everton (1985)
- (Belgium) KV Mechelen (1988)
- (Spain) Barcelona (1989 & 1997)
- (Italy) Sampdoria (1990)
- (England) Manchester United (1991)
- (Germany) Werder Bremen (1992)
- (England) Arsenal (1994)
- (Italy) Lazio (1999)

== Scoring records ==
=== All-time top scorers ===
Rank	Player	Goals	Club(s)
1	(Netherlands) Rob Rensenbrink	25	Club Brugge; Anderlecht
2	(West Germany) Gerd Müller	20	Bayern Munich
3	(Italy) Gianluca Vialli	19	Sampdoria; Chelsea
4	(Belgium) François Van der Elst	18	Anderlecht
5	(Belgium) Roger Claessen	17	Standard Liège; Beerschot
5	(Austria) Hans Krankl	17	Rapid Wien; Barcelona
7	(Angola) Jorge Mendonça	16	Atlético Madrid; Barcelona
8	(Sweden) Kurt Hamrin	15	Fiorentina; Milan
8	(Poland) Włodzimierz Lubański	15	Górnik Zabrze
8	(Israel) Alon Mizrahi	15	Maccabi Haifa
8	(Bulgaria) Hristo Stoichkov	15	CSKA Sofia; Barcelona; Parma

=== Most goals in a single season ===
Goals	Player(s)	Season(s)
14	(West Germany) Lothar Emmerich	1965–66
13	(Bulgaria) Kiril Milanov	1976–77
11	(Portugal) Mascarenhas	1963–64
10	(Belgium) Roger Claessen	1966–67
9	(Argentina) Mario Kempes	1979–80
9	(Italy) Roberto Baggio	1990–91
9	(England) Ian Wright	1994–95
9	(Czech Republic) Petr Samec	1995–96

=== Most goals in a match ===
Goals	Season	Round	Home team	Score	Away team
17	1963–64	Second round, 1st leg	Sporting CP (Portugal)	16–1	(Cyprus) APOEL
14	1976–77	First round, 1st leg	Levski Spartak (Bulgaria)	12–2	(Finland) Lahden Reipas
13	1971–72	First round, 2nd leg	Chelsea (England)	13–0	(Luxembourg) Jeunesse Hautcharage
12	1961–62	First round, 2nd leg	Újpest (Hungary)	10–2	(Malta) Floriana
12	1965–66	First round, 1st leg	Reipas Lahti (Finland)	2–10	(Hungary) Honvéd
12	1982–83	First round, 1st leg	Swansea City (Wales)	12–0	(Malta) Sliema Wanderers
11	1968–69	First round, 1st leg	Dunfermline Athletic (Scotland)	10–1	(Cyprus) APOEL
11	1969–70	First round, 1st leg	Lierse (Belgium)	10–1	(Cyprus) APOEL
11	1973–74	First round, 2nd leg	Malmö FF (Sweden)	11–0	(Cyprus) Pezoporikos
11	1974–75	First round, 1st leg	Liverpool (England)	11–0	(Norway) Strømsgodset

=== Most goals in a two-legged tie ===
Goals	Season	Round	Team 1	Score	Team 2	1st leg	2nd leg
22	1976–77	First round	Levski Spartak (Bulgaria)	19–3	(Finland) Lahden Reipas	12–2	7–1
21	1971–72	First round	Jeunesse Hautcharage (Luxembourg)	0–21	(England) Chelsea	0–8	0–13
19	1961–62	First round	Floriana (Malta)	4–15	(Hungary) Újpest	2–5	2–10
19	1963–64	Second round	Sporting CP (Portugal)	18–1	(Cyprus) APOEL	16–1	2–0
18	1965–66	First round	Reipas Lahti (Finland)	2–16	(Hungary) Honvéd	2–10	0–6
18	1983–84	First round	Valletta (Malta)	0–18	(Scotland) Rangers	0–8	0–10
17	1973–74	First round	ÍB Vestmannaeyja (Iceland)	1–16	(West Germany) Borussia Mönchengladbach	0–7	1–9
17	1982–83	First round	Swansea City (Wales)	17–0	(Malta) Sliema Wanderers	12–0	5–0

=== Largest margin of victory in a match ===
Margin	Season	Round	Winners	Score	Losers
15	1963–64	Second round, 1st leg	Sporting CP (Portugal)	16–1	(Cyprus) APOEL
13	1971–72	First round, 2nd leg	Chelsea (England)	13–0	(Luxembourg) Jeunesse Hautcharage
12	1982–83	First round, 1st leg	Swansea City (Wales)	12–0	(Malta) Sliema Wanderers
11	1973–74	First round, 2nd leg	Malmö FF (Sweden)	11–0	(Cyprus) Pezoporikos
11	1974–75	First round, 1st leg	Liverpool (England)	11–0	(Norway) Strømsgodset
10	1964–65	First round, 1st leg	Spartak Praha Sokolovo (Czechoslovakia)	10–0	(Cyprus) Anorthosis Famagusta
10	1967–68	First round, 1st leg	Aberdeen (Scotland)	10–0	(Iceland) KR Reykjavik
10	1974–75	First round, 1st leg	PSV Eindhoven (Netherlands)	10–0	(Northern Ireland) Ards
10	1976–77	First round, 1st leg	Levski Spartak (Bulgaria)	12–2	(Finland) Lahden Reipas
10	1983–84	First round, 2nd leg	Rangers (Scotland)	10–0	(Malta) Valletta
10	1994–95	Qualifying round, 2nd leg	Maribor (Slovenia)	10–0	(Estonia) Norma Tallinn
10	1997–98	First round, 2nd leg	Roda (Netherlands)	10–0	(Israel) Hapoel Be'er Sheva

=== Largest margin of victory in an away match ===
Margin	Season	Round	Home team	Score	Away team
8	1965–66	First round, 1st leg	Reipas Lahti (Finland)	2–10	(Hungary) Honvéd
8	1971–72	First round, 1st leg	Jeunesse Hautcharage (Luxembourg)	0–8	(England) Chelsea
8	1983–84	First round, 1st leg	Valletta (Malta)	0–8	(Scotland) Rangers
7	1970–71	First round, 2nd leg	IB Akureyri (Iceland)	0–7	(Switzerland) Zürich
7	1973–74	First round, 1st leg	ÍB Vestmannaeyja (Iceland)	0–7	(West Germany) Borussia Mönchengladbach
7	1993–94	Second round, 2nd leg	Standard Liège (Belgium)	0–7	(England) Arsenal
7	1995–96	First round, 1st leg	DAG-Liepaja (Latvia)	0–7	(Netherlands) Feyenoord
6	1964–65	First round, 2nd leg	Anorthosis Famagusta (Cyprus)	0–6	(Czechoslovakia) Spartak Praha Sokolovo
6	1965–66	First round, 1st leg	Go Ahead Eagles (Netherlands)	0–6	(Scotland) Celtic
6	1969–70	First round, 1st leg	Mjøndalen (Norway)	1–7	(Wales) Cardiff City
6	1976–77	First round, 2nd leg	Lahden Reipas (Finland)	1–7	(Bulgaria) Levski Spartak
6	1980–81	First round, 1st leg	Spora (Luxembourg)	0–6	(Czechoslovakia) Sparta Prague
6	1991–92	First round, 1st leg	Bacău (Romania)	0–6	(Germany) Werder Bremen

=== Largest margin of victory in a two-legged tie ===
Margin	Season	Round	Winners	Score	Losers	1st leg	2nd leg
21	1971–72	First round	Chelsea (England)	21–0	(Luxembourg) Jeunesse Hautcharage	8–0	13–0
18	1983–84	First round	Rangers (Scotland)	18–0	(Malta) Valletta	8–0	10–0
17	1963–64	Second round	Sporting CP (Portugal)	18–1	(Cyprus) APOEL	16–1	2–0
17	1982–83	First round	Swansea City (Wales)	17–0	(Malta) Sliema Wanderers	12–0	5–0
16	1964–65	First round	Spartak Praha Sokolovo (Czechoslovakia)	16–0	(Cyprus) Anorthosis Famagusta	10–0	6–0
16	1976–77	First round	Levski Spartak (Bulgaria)	19–3	(Finland) Lahden Reipas	12–2	7–1
15	1973–74	First round	Borussia Mönchengladbach (West Germany)	16–1	(Iceland) ÍB Vestmannaeyja	7–0	9–1
14	1965–66	First round	Honvéd (Hungary)	16–2	(Finland) Reipas Lahti	10–2	6–0

=== Highest-scoring matches with at least three goals for each side ===
Below is a list of matches with at least eight goals scored, including at least three by each side.

Season	Round	Home team	Score	Away team
1962–63	First round, 2nd leg	Boldklubben 1909 (Denmark)	5–3	(Austria) GAK
1963–64	Second round, 1st leg	Barcelona (Spain)	4–4	(West Germany) Hamburger SV
1966–67	First round, 2nd leg	Galatasaray (Turkey)	3–5	(Austria) Rapid Wien
1967–68	First round, 1st leg	Hamburger SV (Germany)	5–3	(Denmark) Randers
1986–87	Second round, 2nd leg	VfB Stuttgart (Germany)	3–5	(Soviet Union) Torpedo Moscow
1989–90	First round, 2nd leg	Celtic (Scotland)	5–4	(Socialist Federal Republic of Yugoslavia) Partizan
1993–94	Quarter-finals, 2nd leg	Bayer Leverkusen (Germany)	4–4	(Portugal) Benfica
1996–97	Second round, 2nd leg	Liverpool (England)	6–3	(Switzerland) Sion

=== Most goals in a two-legged tie without advancing ===
The following sides scored five or more goals over a two-legged tie, but were still eliminated from the competition.

Season	Round	Losers	Score	Winners	1st leg	2nd leg
1961–62	Preliminary round	La Chaux-de-Fonds (Switzerland)	6–7	(Portugal) Leixões	6–2	0–5
1971–72	Second round	Sporting CP (Portugal)	6–6 (a)	(Scotland) Rangers	2–3	4–3
1972–73	Second round	Atlético Madrid (Spain)	5–5 (a)	(Soviet Union) Spartak Moscow	3–4	2–1
1975–76	Quarter-finals	ADO Den Haag (Netherlands)	5–5 (a)	(England) West Ham United	4–2	1–3
1977–78	Second round	Manchester United (England)	5–6	(Portugal) Porto	0–4	5–2
1979–80	First round	Wrexham (Wales)	5–7	(East Germany) 1. FC Magdeburg	3–2	2–5 (a.e.t.)
1983–84	Second round	1. FC Köln (West Germany)	5–5 (a)	(Hungary) Újpest	1–3	4–2
1984–85	First round	Barcelona (Spain)	5–6	(France) Metz	4–2	1–4
1985–86	Quarter-finals	Dynamo Dresden (East Germany)	5–7	(West Germany) Bayer Uerdingen	2–0	3–7
1986–87	First round	Club Brugge (Belgium)	6–7	(Austria) Rapid Wien	3–4	3–3
1989–90	First round	Swansea City (Wales)	5–6	(Greece) Panathinaikos	2–3	3–3
1989–90	First round	Celtic (Scotland)	6–6 (a)	(Socialist Federal Republic of Yugoslavia) Partizan	1–2	5–4
1989–90	Second round	Groningen (Netherlands)	5–6	(Socialist Federal Republic of Yugoslavia) Partizan	4–3	1–3
1992–93	Second round	Admira Wacker (Austria)	6–7	(Belgium) Antwerp	2–4	4–3 (a.e.t.)
1993–94	Quarter-finals	Bayer Leverkusen (Germany)	5–5 (a)	(Portugal) Benfica	1–1	4–4
1994–95	Semi-finals	Sampdoria (Italy)	5–5 (2–3 p)	(England) Arsenal	2–3	3–2 (a.e.t.)
1997–98	Second round	Zagreb (Croatia)	5–6	(Norway) Tromsø	3–2	2–4 (a.e.t.)

=== Biggest two-legged comebacks ===
Below is a list of two-legged ties where a side qualified for the next round after trailing the tie at some point by three goals or more, or by two goals along with an away goal deficit.

Season	Round	Winners	Score	Losers	1st leg	2nd leg
1961–62	Preliminary round	Leixões (Portugal)	7–6	(Switzerland) La Chaux-de-Fonds	2–6	5–0
1963–64	Quarter-finals	Sporting CP (Portugal)	6–4	(England) Manchester United	1–4	5–0
1963–64	Semi-finals	MTK Budapest (Hungary)	4–3	(Scotland) Celtic	0–3	4–0
1972–73	Second round	Hajduk Split (Socialist Federal Republic of Yugoslavia)	3–3 (a)	(Wales) Wrexham	1–3 (trailed 0–3)	2–0
1972–73	Quarter-finals	Hajduk Split (Socialist Federal Republic of Yugoslavia)	5–4	(Scotland) Hibernian	2–4 (trailed 1–4)	3–0
1975–76	Quarter-finals	West Ham United (England)	5–5 (a)	(Netherlands) FC Den Haag	2–4 (trailed 0–4)	3–1
1978–79	Second round	Barcelona (Spain)	3–3 (4–1 p)	(Belgium) Anderlecht	0–3	3–0 (a.e.t.)
1980–81	First round	Carl Zeiss Jena (East Germany)	4–3	(Italy) Roma	0–3	4–0
1984–85	First round	Metz (France)	6–5	(Spain) Barcelona	2–4 (trailed 1–4)	4–1 (trailed 0–1)
1984–85	Quarter-finals	Rapid Wien (Austria)	5–3	(East Germany) Dynamo Dresden	0–3	5–0
1985–86	Quarter-finals	Bayer Uerdingen (West Germany)	7–5	(East Germany) Dynamo Dresden	0–2	7–3 (trailed 0–1 and 1–3)
1989–90	First round	Grasshopper (Switzerland)	4–3	(Czechoslovakia) Slovan Bratislava	0–3	4–0 (a.e.t.)
1992–93	Semi-finals	Antwerp (Belgium)	3–2	(Russia) Spartak Moscow	0–1	3–1 (trailed 0–1)
1994–95	Qualifying round	Tirana (Albania)	4–4 (a)	(Belarus) Fandok Bobruisk	1–4 (trailed 0–4)	3–0
1995–96	Second round	Parma (Italy)	4–3	(Sweden) Halmstad	0–3	4–0
1996–97	First round	Brann (Norway)	6–3	(Belgium) Cercle Brugge	2–3 (trailed 0–3)	4–0
1997–98	First round	Tromsø (Norway)	6–5	(Croatia) Zagreb	2–3 (trailed 0–3)	4–2 (a.e.t.)
1997–98	Semi-finals	Chelsea (England)	3–2	(Italy) Vicenza	0–1	3–1 (trailed 0–1)

==== Single match ====
In the entire history of the Cup Winners' Cup, there was only one instance where a side avoided defeat after trailing by three or more goals during a single match:

- Vålerenga were trailing 3–0 to Beşiktaş after 40 minutes in the 1998–99 second round, but managed to finish the game 3–3.

== See also ==
- European Cup and UEFA Champions League records and statistics
- European association football club records and statistics
- UEFA Cup and Europa League records and statistics
- UEFA club competition records and statistics
- Intercontinental Cup records and statistics
- List of world association football records
