= 1962–63 Taça de Portugal =

Tournament details
- Country: Portugal
- Dates: 23 September 1962 – 30 June 1963

Final positions
- Champions: Sporting CP (6th title)
- Runners-up: Vitória de Guimarães

Tournament statistics
- Matches played: 91
- Goals scored: 379 (4.16 per match)
- Top goal scorer(s): Mascarenhas (17 goals)

The 1962–63 Taça de Portugal was the 23rd edition of the Portuguese football knockout tournament, organized by the Portuguese Football Federation (FPF). The 1962–63 Taça de Portugal began on 23 September 1962. The final was played on 30 June 1963 at the Estádio Nacional.

Benfica were the previous holders, having defeated Vitória de Setúbal 3–0 in the previous season's final. Defending champions Benfica were eliminated in the semi-finals by Sporting CP. Sporting CP defeated Vitória de Guimarães, 4–0 in the final to win their sixth Taça de Portugal.

== First round ==
Teams from the Primeira Liga (I) and the Portuguese Second Division (II) entered at this stage.

| Team 1 | Agg. | Team 2 | 1st leg | 2nd leg | 3rd leg |
|---|---|---|---|---|---|
| Académica de Coimbra (I) | 12 – 2 | Académico de Viseu (II) | 10 – 1 | 2 – 1 | |
| Alhandra (II) | 8 – 5 | Sporting CP (II) | 0 – 4 | 4 – 0 | 4 – 1 |
| Atlético CP (I) | 3 – 2 | Barreirense (I) | 2 – 0 | 1 – 2 | {{{8}}} |
| Beira-Mar (II) | 5 – 2 | Farense (II) | 4 – 2 | 1 – 0 | |
| Belenenses (I) | 10 – 2 | Montijo (II) | 4 – 2 | 6 – 0 | |
| Benfica Castelo Branco (II) | 4 – 3 | Sanjoanense (II) | 2 – 1 | 2 – 2 | |
| Cova da Piedade (II) | 4 – 3 | Torreense (II) | 3 – 2 | 1 – 1 | |
| Fabril Barreiro (I) | 5 – 2 | Olhanense (II) | 1 – 1 | 4 – 1 | |
| Feirense (I) | 4 – 3 | Boavista (II) | 0 – 1 | 2 – 1 | 2 – 1 |
| Leixões (I) | 6 – 3 | Braga (II) | 5 – 2 | 1 – 1 | |
| Lusitano de Évora (I) | 11 – 1 | Portalegrense (II) | 10 – 0 | 1 – 1 | |
| Luso (II) | 0 – 19 | Benfica (I) | 0 – 7 | 0 – 12 | |
| Marinhense (II) | 5 – 2 | Silves (II) | 4 – 1 | 1 – 1 | |
| Olhanense (I) | 6 – 1 | Peniche (II) | 3 – 0 | 3 – 1 | |
| Portimonense (II) | 7 – 1 | Leça (II) | 7 – 0 | 0 – 1 | |
| Sacavenense (II) | 6 – 5 | Vianense (II) | 1 – 1 | 1 – 1 | 4 – 3 |
| Seixal (II) | 8 – 3 | Lusitano VRSA (II) | 4 – 2 | 4 – 1 | |
| Sporting CP (I) | 8 – 1 | Oliveirense (II) | 4 – 1 | 4 – 0 | |
| Varzim (II) | 12 – 2 | Oriental (II) | 4 – 2 | 8 – 0 | |
| Vitória de Guimarães (I) | 5 – 1 | Sporting da Covilhã (II) | 3 – 1 | 2 – 0 | |
| Vitória de Setúbal (I) | 4 – 7 | Porto (I) | 0 – 2 | 3 – 1 | 1 – 4 |

== Second round ==
Vitória de Guimarães took a bye to the next round.

| Team 1 | Agg. | Team 2 | 1st leg | 2nd leg | 3rd leg |
|---|---|---|---|---|---|
| Alhandra (II) | 4 – 3 | Benfica Castelo Branco (II) | 3 – 1 | 1 – 2 | |
| Atlético CP (II) | 4 – 2 | Portimonense (II) | 0 – 2 | 4 – 0 | |
| Belenenses (I) | 4 – 1 | Olhanense (I) | 0 – 0 | 4 – 1 | |
| Feirense (I) | 0 – 15 | Porto (I) | 0 – 6 | 0 – 9 | |
| Leixões (I) | 8 – 2 | Fabril Barreiro (I) | 3 – 1 | 5 – 1 | |
| Lusitano de Évora (I) | 2 – 5 | Benfica (I) | 1 – 3 | 1 – 2 | |
| Marinhense (II) | 4 – 3 | Varzim (II) | 2 – 1 | 2 – 2 | |
| Sacavenense (II) | 4 – 7 | Académica de Coimbra (I) | 0 – 1 | 3 – 2 | 1 – 4 |
| Seixal (II) | 4 – 1 | Beira-Mar (II) | 5 – 0 | 1 – 2 | |
| Sporting CP (I) | 11 – 1 | Cova da Piedade (II) | 3 – 1 | 2 – 2 | |

== Third round ==
Ties were played between the 19–26 May. Benfica took a bye to the next round.

| Team 1 | Agg. | Team 2 | 1st leg | 2nd leg |
|---|---|---|---|---|
| Belenenses (I) | 7 – 1 | Seixal (II) | 2 – 1 | 5 – 0 |
| Marinhense (II) | 8 – 4 | Alhandra (II) | 3 – 0 | 5 – 4 |
| Porto (I) | 3 – 0 | Leixões (I) | 1 – 0 | 2 – 0 |
| Sporting CP (I) | 12 – 0 | Atlético CP (II) | 10 – 0 | 2 – 0 |
| Vitória de Guimarães (I) | 4 – 3 | Académica de Coimbra (I) | 1 – 2 | 3 – 1 |

== Quarter-finals ==
Ties were played between the 2–9 June. Mozambican side Sporting de Lourenço Marques and União da Madeira were invited to participate in the competition.

| Team 1 | Agg. | Team 2 | 1st leg | 2nd leg |
|---|---|---|---|---|
| Marinhense (II) | 1 – 8 | Benfica (I) | 1 – 3 | 0 – 5 |
| Porto (I) | 1 – 4 | Belenenses (I) | 1 – 1 | 0 – 3 |
| Sporting de Lourenço Marques (N/A) | 3 – 7 | Sporting CP (I) | 1 – 3 | 2 – 4 |
| Vitória de Guimarães (I) | 6 – 2 | União da Madeira (N/A) | 1 – 2 | 5 – 0 |

== Semi-finals ==
Ties were played between the 16–23 June.

| Team 1 | Agg. | Team 2 | 1st leg | 2nd leg | 3rd leg |
|---|---|---|---|---|---|
| Vitória de Guimarães (I) | 6 – 4 | Belenenses (I) | 0 – 2 | 3 – 1 | 3 – 1 |
| Sporting CP (I) | 2 – 1 | Benfica (I) | 0 – 1 | 2 – 0 | |

== Final ==
30 June 1963

| Sporting CP | 4 – 0 | Vitória de Guimarães |
|---|---|---|
| Figueiredo 25', 70'; Lúcio 73'; Mascarenhas 87' | (Report) |

Estádio Nacional, Oeiras
Referee: Francisco Guerra (Porto)
