= Ernesto Figueiredo =

Portuguese footballer (1937–2025)

Personal information
- Full name: Ernesto de Figueiredo Cordeiro
- Date of birth: 6 July 1937
- Place of birth: Tomar, Portugal
- Date of death: 13 December 2025 (aged 88)
- Place of death: Alcobaça, Portugal
- Position: Striker

Senior career*
| Years | Team | Apps | (Gls) |
| 1955–1956 | Matrena | | |
| 1956–1959 | União Tomar | | |
| 1959–1960 | Cernache | | |
| 1960–1968 | Sporting CP | 155 | (100) |
| 1968–1970 | Vitória Setúbal | 41 | (14) |

International career
| 1966–1969 | Portugal | 6 | (0) |
Medal record
Men's football
Representing Portugal
FIFA World Cup
| Third place | 1966 England |
- * Club domestic league appearances and goals

Ernesto de Figueiredo Cordeiro (6 July 1937 – 13 December 2025) was a Portuguese footballer who played as a striker.

== Club career ==
Born in Tomar, Santarém District, Figueiredo arrived at Sporting CP in summer 1960 from amateurs União Desportiva e Recreativa de Cernache, aged already 23. He scored 17 goals in only 24 games in his first season with his new team, good enough for Primeira Liga runner-up accolades.

At the end of the 1965–66 campaign, Figueiredo finished joint-top scorer alongside S.L. Benfica's Eusébio – both at 25 goals – but his team won the league by one point. He netted 147 times in 232 competitive appearances during his tenure; additionally, in the 1963–64 edition of the UEFA Cup Winners' Cup, he featured in the final against MTK Budapest FC, won after a replay and with the player scoring twice in the first match (3–3 draw).

Nicknamed Altafini of Cernache while at the Estádio José Alvalade, Figueiredo retired in 1970 after two years with Vitória de Setúbal also in the top division. Subsequently, he worked as a taxi driver.

== International career ==
Figueiredo earned six caps for Portugal, making his debut on 21 June 1966 in a friendly with Denmark. He was selected by manager Otto Glória for his 1966 FIFA World Cup squad, being an unused member for the third-placed team.

== Death ==
Figueiredo died on 13 December 2025, at the age of 88.

== Honours ==
Sporting CP

- Primeira Liga: 1961–62, 1965–66
- Taça de Portugal: 1962–63
- UEFA Cup Winners' Cup: 1963–64

Portugal

- FIFA World Cup third place: 1966
