= 1962–63 Irish Cup =

Tournament details
- Country: Northern Ireland
- Teams: 16

Final positions
- Champions: Linfield (29th win)
- Runners-up: Distillery

Tournament statistics
- Matches played: 17
- Goals scored: 67 (3.94 per match)

The 1962–63 Irish Cup was the 83rd edition of the Irish Cup, the premier knock-out cup competition in Northern Irish football.

Linfield won the cup for the 29th time and second consecutive year, defeating Distillery 2–1 in the final at The Oval.

== Results ==
=== First round ===
| Team 1 | Score | Team 2 |
|---|---|---|
| Ards | 3–2 | Portadown Reserves |
| Ballymena United | 4–1 | Portadown |
| Bangor | 1–1 | Cliftonville |
| Coleraine | 4–0 | Shorts |
| Glenavon | 0–0 | Distillery |
| Glentoran | 4–1 | Ballyclare Comrades |
| Linfield | 3–1 | Derry City |
| Newry Town | 0–2 | Crusaders |

==== Replay ====
| Team 1 | Score | Team 2 |
|---|---|---|
| Cliftonville | 0–1 | Bangor |
| Distillery | 4–2 | Glenavon |

=== Quarter-finals ===
| Team 1 | Score | Team 2 |
|---|---|---|
| Ballymena United | 3–1 | Glentoran |
| Bangor | 2–6 | Crusaders |
| Coleraine | 1–3 | Linfield |
| Distillery | 4–2 | Ards |

=== Semi-finals ===
| Team 1 | Score | Team 2 |
|---|---|---|
| Distillery | 3–1 | Ballymena United |
| Linfield | 3–1 | Crusaders |

=== Final ===
20 April 1963

| Linfield | 2–1 | Distillery |
|---|---|---|
| Cairns 16'; Braithwaite 61' | Report | Kennedy 46' |

The Oval, Belfast
Attendance: 20,000
Referee: S. Carswell (Belfast)
