= Constant Winandy =

Luxembourgish footballer (1933–2020)

Personal information
- Date of birth: 1 April 1933
- Date of death: 14 January 2020 (aged 86)

International career
| Years | Team | Apps | (Gls) |
| 1958–1963 | Luxembourg | 9 | (0) |

Constant Winandy (1 April 1933 – 14 January 2020) was a Luxembourgish footballer. He played in nine matches for the Luxembourg national football team from 1958 to 1963. Winandy died in Ettelbruck on 14 January 2020, at the age of 86.
