= Mihály Vasas =

Hungarian footballer (born 1933)

Personal information
- Full name: Mihály Vasas
- Date of birth: 14 September 1933 (age 93)
- Place of birth: Békéscsaba, Hungary
- Position: Forward

Senior career*
| Years | Team | Apps | (Gls) |
| 1953–1961 | Salgótarjáni BTC | 197 | (64) |
| 1961–1965 | MTK Budapest FC | 64 | (10) |
| Total | | 261 | (74) |

International career
| 1958 | Hungary | 2 | (2) |

Managerial career
- 1972–1975: Szombierki Bytom
- * Club domestic league appearances and goals

Mihály Vasas (born 14 September 1933) is a Hungarian football forward who played for Hungary in the 1958 FIFA World Cup. He also played for Salgótarjáni BTC. He is the last Hungarian surviving player at World Cup 1958.
