= Mascarenhas (footballer) =

Angolan footballer

Domingos Mascarenhas
Personal information
- Full name: Domingos António da Silva
- Date of birth: 28 April 1937
- Place of birth: Vila Salazar, Angola
- Date of death: 25 August 2015 (aged 78)
- Place of death: Lisbon, Portugal
- Position: Forward

Senior career*
Years	Team	Apps	(Gls)
1958–1959	Benfica	2	(1)
1959–1962	Barreirense	25	(10)
1962–1965	Sporting CP	26	(12)
1965–1966	Barreirense	17	(7)
1966–1967	CUF	8	(1)
1967–1968	Peniche		
1969–1971	Riopele		
1972–1975	Paços Ferreira		
- * Club domestic league appearances and goals

Domingos António da Silva (28 April 1937 – 25 August 2015), known as Mascarenhas, was an Angolan footballer who played as a forward.

== Club career ==
Mascarenhas was born in Vila Salazar, Portuguese Angola. After one season with S.L. Benfica and three with F.C. Barreirense, he joined Sporting CP in 1962; during his three-year spell with the Lisbon club, he scored 80 goals in 107 matches all appearances comprised, even friendlies.

In the 1963 Portuguese Cup final, Mascarenhas scored once in a 4–0 victory over Vitória de Guimarães. The following campaign, in Sporting's victorious campaign in the UEFA Cup Winners' Cup, he netted six times in a 16–1 home rout of APOEL FC (European competition record, tied in 2003), adding another in the final against MTK Budapest FC, the 3–3 leading to a replay in Antwerp which ended with a 1–0 win for the Lions.

== Death ==
Mascarenhas died on 25 August 2015 at the São José Hospital in Lisbon, after a long illness. He was 78 years old.
