= UEFA Cup and Europa League records and statistics =

Statistics of the football club competition

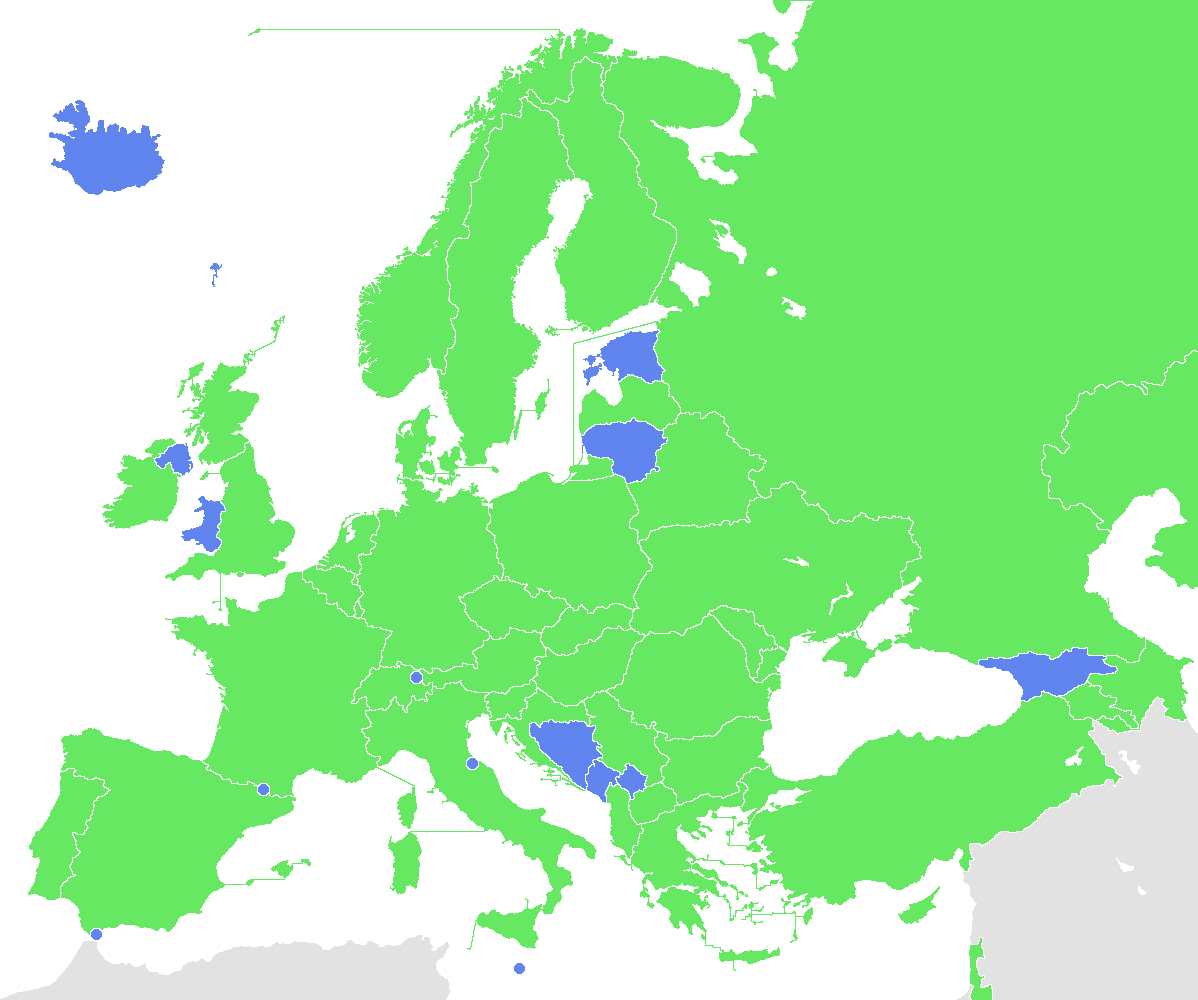
Map of UEFA countries whose teams reached the group stage of the UEFA Europa League UEFA member country that has been represented in the group stage UEFA member country that has not been represented in the group stage

This page details statistics of the UEFA Cup and UEFA Europa League. Unless notified these statistics concern all seasons since the inception of the UEFA Cup in the 1971–72 season, including qualifying rounds. The UEFA Cup replaced the Inter-Cities Fairs Cup in the 1971–72 season, so the Fairs Cup is not considered a UEFA competition, and hence clubs' records in the Fairs Cup are not considered part of their European record.

== General performances ==
=== By club ===
A total of 31 clubs have won the tournament since its 1971 inception, with Sevilla being the only team to win it seven times, and only one to win three in a row. A total of fifteen clubs have won the tournament multiple times: the forementioned club, along with Liverpool, Juventus, Inter Milan, Atlético Madrid, Borussia Mönchengladbach, Tottenham Hotspur, Real Madrid, IFK Göteborg, Parma, Feyenoord, Chelsea, Porto and Eintracht Frankfurt. A total of 33 clubs have reached the final without ever managing to win the tournament.

Clubs from eleven countries have provided tournament winners. Spanish clubs have been the most successful, winning a total of fourteen titles. England is second with eleven, followed by Italy in third with ten, while the other multiple-time winners are Germany with seven, Netherlands with four, and Portugal, Sweden and Russia with two each. The only other countries to provide a tournament winner are Belgium, Ukraine, and Turkey. France, Scotland, Yugoslavia, Hungary, and Austria have all provided losing finalists.

The 1980 UEFA Cup saw four Bundesliga teams (i.e., Bayern Munich, Eintracht Frankfurt, Borussia Mönchengladbach, and VfB Stuttgart) make up all of the semi-finals competitors — a unique record for one country. Frankfurt beat Mönchengladbach in the final.

Clubs from a total of 56 European cities have participated in the tournament final. Clubs from 29 cities have provided winners, with the clear city leaders being Seville (seven), followed by London and Madrid (five each).

Performance in the UEFA Cup and UEFA Europa League by club
Club	Winners	Runners-up	Years won	Years runner-up
(Spain) Sevilla	7	0	2006, 2007, 2014, 2015, 2016, 2020, 2023	—
(Italy) Inter Milan	3	2	1991, 1994, 1998	1997, 2020
(England) Tottenham Hotspur	3	1	1972, 1984, 2025	1974
(England) Liverpool	3	1	1973, 1976, 2001	2016
(Italy) Juventus	3	1	1977, 1990, 1993	1995
(Spain) Atlético Madrid	3	0	2010, 2012, 2018	—
(Germany) Borussia Mönchengladbach	2	2	1975, 1979	1973, 1980
(Netherlands) Feyenoord	2	0	1974, 2002	—
(Germany) Eintracht Frankfurt	2	0	1980, 2022	—
(Sweden) IFK Göteborg	2	0	1982, 1987	—
(Spain) Real Madrid	2	0	1985, 1986	—
(Italy) Parma	2	0	1995, 1999	—
(Portugal) Porto	2	0	2003, 2011	—
(England) Chelsea	2	0	2013, 2019	—
(England) Manchester United	1	2	2017	2021, 2025
(Belgium) Anderlecht	1	1	1983	1984
(Germany) Bayer Leverkusen	1	1	1988	2024
(Netherlands) Ajax	1	1	1992	2017
(Netherlands) PSV Eindhoven	1	0	1978	—
(England) Ipswich Town	1	0	1981	—
(Italy) Napoli	1	0	1989	—
(Germany) Bayern Munich	1	0	1996	—
(Germany) Schalke 04	1	0	1997	—
(Turkey) Galatasaray	1	0	2000	—
(Spain) Valencia	1	0	2004	—
(Russia) CSKA Moscow	1	0	2005	—
(Russia) Zenit Saint Petersburg	1	0	2008	—
(Ukraine) Shakhtar Donetsk	1	0	2009	—
(Spain) Villarreal	1	0	2021	—
(Italy) Atalanta	1	0	2024	—
(England) Aston Villa	1	0	2026	—
(Portugal) Benfica	0	3	—	1983, 2013, 2014
(France) Marseille	0	3	—	1999, 2004, 2018
(Spain) Athletic Bilbao	0	2	—	1977, 2012
(Spain) Espanyol	0	2	—	1988, 2007
(Italy) Roma	0	2	—	1991, 2023
(Germany) Borussia Dortmund	0	2	—	1993, 2002
(England) Arsenal	0	2	—	2000, 2019
(Scotland) Rangers	0	2	—	2008, 2022
(England) Wolverhampton Wanderers	0	1	—	1972
(Netherlands) Twente	0	1	—	1975
(Belgium) Club Brugge	0	1	—	1976
(France) Bastia	0	1	—	1978
(Socialist Federal Republic of Yugoslavia) Red Star Belgrade	0	1	—	1979
(Netherlands) AZ	0	1	—	1981
(Germany) Hamburger SV	0	1	—	1982
(Hungary) Videoton	0	1	—	1985
(Germany) 1. FC Köln	0	1	—	1986
(Scotland) Dundee United	0	1	—	1987
(Germany) VfB Stuttgart	0	1	—	1989
(Italy) Fiorentina	0	1	—	1990
(Italy) Torino	0	1	—	1992
Austria Salzburg	0	1	—	1994
(France) Bordeaux	0	1	—	1996
(Italy) Lazio	0	1	—	1998
(Spain) Alavés	0	1	—	2001
(Scotland) Celtic	0	1	—	2003
(Portugal) Sporting CP	0	1	—	2005
(England) Middlesbrough	0	1	—	2006
(Germany) Werder Bremen	0	1	—	2009
(England) Fulham	0	1	—	2010
(Portugal) Braga	0	1	—	2011
(Ukraine) Dnipro Dnipropetrovsk	0	1	—	2015
(Germany) SC Freiburg	0	1	—	2026

=== By nation ===
As of 2025–26 season

Country	Winners	Runners-up	Winning clubs	Runners-up
Spain	14	5	Sevilla (7); Atlético Madrid (3); Real Madrid (2); Valencia (1); Villarreal (1)	Espanyol (2); Athletic Bilbao (2); Alavés (1)
England	11	9	Liverpool (3); Tottenham Hotspur (3); Chelsea (2); Ipswich Town (1); Manchester United (1); Aston Villa (1)	Arsenal (2); Manchester United (2); Wolverhampton Wanderers (1); Tottenham Hotspur (1); Middlesbrough (1); Fulham (1); Liverpool (1)
Italy	10	8	Inter Milan (3); Juventus (3); Parma (2); Napoli (1); Atalanta (1)	Inter Milan (2); Roma (2); Fiorentina (1); Torino (1); Juventus (1); Lazio (1)
Germany	7	10	Borussia Mönchengladbach (2); Eintracht Frankfurt (2); Bayer Leverkusen (1); Bayern Munich (1); Schalke 04 (1)	Borussia Mönchengladbach (2); Borussia Dortmund (2); Hamburger SV (1); 1. FC Köln (1); VfB Stuttgart (1); Werder Bremen (1); Bayer Leverkusen (1); SC Freiburg (1)
Netherlands	4	3	Feyenoord (2); PSV Eindhoven (1); Ajax (1)	Twente (1); AZ (1); Ajax (1)
Portugal	2	5	Porto (2)	Benfica (3); Sporting CP (1); Braga (1)
Sweden	2	0	IFK Göteborg (2)	—
Russia	2	0	CSKA Moscow (1); Zenit Saint Petersburg (1)	—
Belgium	1	2	Anderlecht (1)	Club Brugge (1); Anderlecht (1)
Ukraine	1	1	Shakhtar Donetsk (1)	Dnipro Dnipropetrovsk (1)
Turkey	1	0	Galatasaray (1)	—
France	0	5	—	Marseille (3); Bastia (1); Bordeaux (1)
Scotland	0	4	—	Rangers (2); Dundee United (1); Celtic (1)
Yugoslavia	0	1	—	Red Star Belgrade (1)
Hungary	0	1	—	Videoton (1)
Austria	0	1	—	Red Bull Salzburg (1)

=== By city ===
As of 2025–26 season

City	Winners	Runners-up	Winning clubs	Runners-up
(Spain) Seville	7	0	Sevilla (7)	
(England) London	5	4	Tottenham Hotspur (3), Chelsea (2)	Arsenal (2), Tottenham Hotspur (1), Fulham (1)
(Spain) Madrid	5	0	Atlético Madrid (3), Real Madrid (2)	
(Italy) Turin	3	2	Juventus (3)	Torino (1), Juventus (1)
(Italy) Milan	3	2	Inter Milan (3)	Inter Milan (2)
(England) Liverpool	3	1	Liverpool (3)	Liverpool (1)
(Germany) Mönchengladbach	2	2	Borussia Mönchengladbach (2)	Borussia Mönchengladbach (2)
(Sweden) Gothenburg	2	0	IFK Göteborg (2)	
(Italy) Parma	2	0	Parma (2)	
(Netherlands) Rotterdam	2	0	Feyenoord (2)	
(Portugal) Porto	2	0	Porto (2)	
(Germany) Frankfurt	2	0	Eintracht Frankfurt (2)	
(England) Manchester	1	2	Manchester United (1)	Manchester United (2)
(Belgium) Brussels	1	1	Anderlecht (1)	Anderlecht (1)
(Netherlands) Amsterdam	1	1	Ajax (1)	Ajax (1)
(Germany) Leverkusen	1	1	Bayer Leverkusen (1)	Bayer Leverkusen (1)
(Netherlands) Eindhoven	1	0	PSV Eindhoven (1)	
(England) Ipswich	1	0	Ipswich Town (1)	
(Italy) Naples	1	0	Napoli (1)	
(Germany) Munich	1	0	Bayern Munich (1)	
(Germany) Gelsenkirchen	1	0	Schalke 04 (1)	
(Turkey) Istanbul	1	0	Galatasaray (1)	
(Spain) Valencia	1	0	Valencia (1)	
(Russia) Moscow	1	0	CSKA Moscow (1)	
(Russia) Saint Petersburg	1	0	Zenit Saint Petersburg (1)	
(Ukraine) Donetsk	1	0	Shakhtar Donetsk (1)	
(Spain) Villarreal	1	0	Villarreal (1)	
(Italy) Bergamo	1	0	Atalanta (1)	
(England) Birmingham	1	0	Aston Villa (1)	
(Portugal) Lisbon	0	4		Benfica (3), Sporting CP (1)
(France) Marseille	0	3		Marseille (3)
(Scotland) Glasgow	0	3		Rangers (2), Celtic (1)
(Italy) Rome	0	3		Roma (2), Lazio (1)
(Germany) Dortmund	0	2		Borussia Dortmund (2)
(Spain) Barcelona	0	2		Espanyol (2)
(Spain) Bilbao	0	2		Athletic Bilbao (2)
(England) Wolverhampton	0	1		Wolverhampton Wanderers (1)
(Netherlands) Enschede	0	1		Twente (1)
(Belgium) Bruges	0	1		Club Brugge (1)
(France) Bastia	0	1		Bastia (1)
(Serbia) Belgrade	0	1		Red Star Belgrade (1)
(Netherlands) Alkmaar	0	1		AZ (1)
(Germany) Hamburg	0	1		Hamburger SV (1)
(Hungary) Székesfehérvár	0	1		Videoton (1)
(Germany) Cologne	0	1		1. FC Köln (1)
(Scotland) Dundee	0	1		Dundee United (1)
(Germany) Stuttgart	0	1		VfB Stuttgart (1)
(Italy) Florence	0	1		Fiorentina (1)
(Austria) Salzburg	0	1		Red Bull Salzburg (1)
(France) Bordeaux	0	1		Bordeaux (1)
(Spain) Vitoria-Gasteiz	0	1		Alavés (1)
(England) Middlesbrough	0	1		Middlesbrough (1)
(Germany) Bremen	0	1		Werder Bremen (1)
(Portugal) Braga	0	1		Braga (1)
(Ukraine) Dnipro	0	1		Dnipro Dnipropetrovsk (1)
(Germany) Freiburg im Breisgau	0	1		SC Freiburg (1)

=== By player ===
- Most titles: José Antonio Reyes (5)
  - Atlético Madrid (2): 2009–10, 2011–12
  - Sevilla (3): 2013–14, 2014–15, 2015–16

=== By manager ===
- Most titles: Unai Emery (5)
  - Sevilla (3): 2013–14, 2014–15, 2015–16
  - Villarreal (1): 2020–21
  - Aston Villa (1): 2025–26

=== All-time points table ===
In this ranking, two points are awarded for a win, one for a draw, and zero for a loss. Following statistical convention in football, matches decided in extra time are counted as wins and losses, while matches decided by penalty shoot-outs are counted as draws. Teams are ranked by total points, then by goal difference, then by goals scored. Only the top twenty-five are listed (includes qualifying rounds).

As of 10 November 2026

Rank	Club	Seasons	Pld	W	D	L	GF	GA	GD	Pts
1	(Italy) Roma	22	196	102	42	52	336	193	+143	246
2	(Portugal) Sporting CP	36	203	95	48	60	321	226	+95	238
3	(England) Tottenham Hotspur	17	168	98	40	30	343	147	+196	236
4	(Italy) Inter Milan	28	191	96	44	51	297	173	+124	236
5	(Netherlands) PSV Eindhoven	27	179	90	39	50	305	189	+116	219
6	(Spain) Sevilla	17	158	92	33	33	283	133	+150	217
7	(Belgium) Anderlecht	24	178	87	42	49	295	196	+99	216
8	(Netherlands) Ajax	31	177	89	31	57	305	186	+119	209
9	(Portugal) Braga	23	175	82	38	55	267	212	+55	202
10	(Belgium) Club Brugge	32	182	79	42	61	298	237	+61	200
11	(Italy) Lazio	21	163	79	39	45	258	186	+72	197
12	(Serbia) Red Star Belgrade	33	177	76	44	57	265	220	+45	196
13	(Scotland) Rangers	25	170	72	51	47	244	178	+66	195
14	(Portugal) Benfica	24	152	78	36	38	262	168	+94	192
15	(Netherlands) AZ	18	160	73	43	44	272	200	+72	189
16	(Italy) Juventus	16	132	82	24	26	251	110	+141	188
17	(Romania) FCSB	24	171	71	44	56	237	210	+27	186
18	(Spain) Villarreal	12	134	77	31	26	237	137	+100	185
19	(Greece) PAOK	31	178	68	49	61	254	208	+46	185
20	(Germany) Bayer Leverkusen	21	146	76	32	38	261	145	+116	184
21	(England) Liverpool	15	134	73	34	27	215	106	+109	180
22	(Turkey) Fenerbahçe	28	158	68	41	49	220	198	+22	177
23	(Germany) Stuttgart	19	144	73	28	43	265	165	+100	174
24	(Netherlands) Feyenoord	31	165	67	39	59	254	212	+42	173
25	(Spain) Athletic Bilbao	19	150	72	28	50	243	197	+46	172

=== Number of participating clubs of the Europa League era ===
The following is a list of clubs that have played in or qualified for the Europa League group stage (league phase since the 2024–25 season). Season in bold represents teams that qualified for the knockout phase that season. Starting from the 2021–22 season with the introduction of the knockout round play-offs, round of 16 teams are considered to be qualified.

Nation	No.	Clubs	Seasons
England (23)	7	Tottenham Hotspur	2011–12, **2012–13**, **2013–14**, **2014–15**, **2015–16**, **2020–21**, **2024–25**
England (23)	5	Arsenal	**2017–18**, **2018–19**, **2019–20**, **2020–21**, **2022–23**
England (23)	4	Liverpool	**2010–11**, **2012–13**, **2015–16**, **2023–24**
England (23)	4	Manchester United	**2016–17**, **2019–20**, **2022–23**, **2024–25**
England (23)	3	Everton	**2009–10**, **2014–15**, 2017–18
England (23)	2	Fulham	**2009–10**, 2011–12
England (23)	2	Leicester City	**2020–21**, 2021–22
England (23)	2	West Ham United	**2021–22**, **2023–24**
England (23)	1	Manchester City	**2010–11**
England (23)	1	Stoke City	**2011–12**
England (23)	1	Birmingham City	2011–12
England (23)	1	Newcastle United	**2012–13**
England (23)	1	Swansea City	**2013–14**
England (23)	1	Wigan Athletic	2013–14
England (23)	1	Southampton	2016–17
England (23)	1	Chelsea	**2018–19**
England (23)	1	Wolverhampton Wanderers	**2019–20**
England (23)	1	Brighton & Hove Albion	**2023–24**
England (23)	1	Aston Villa	**2025–26**
England (23)	1	Nottingham Forest	**2025–26**
England (23)	1	Bournemouth	2026–27
England (23)	1	Sunderland	2026–27
England (23)	1	Crystal Palace	2026–27
Germany (18)	7	Bayer Leverkusen	**2010–11**, **2012–13**, **2018–19**, **2020–21**, **2021–22**, **2023–24**, 2026–27
Germany (18)	5	Eintracht Frankfurt	**2013–14**, **2018–19**, **2019–20**, **2021–22**, **2024–25**
Germany (18)	4	SC Freiburg	2013–14, **2022–23**, **2023–24**, **2025–26**
Germany (18)	4	TSG Hoffenheim	2017–18, **2020–21**, 2024–25, 2026–27
Germany (18)	3	Schalke 04	**2011–12**, **2015–16**, **2016–17**
Germany (18)	3	Borussia Mönchengladbach	**2012–13**, **2014–15**, 2019–20
Germany (18)	3	VfB Stuttgart	**2010–11**, **2012–13**, **2025–26**
Germany (18)	2	Hannover 96	**2011–12**, **2012–13**
Germany (18)	2	Borussia Dortmund	2010–11, **2015–16**
Germany (18)	2	Hertha BSC	**2009–10**, 2017–18
Germany (18)	2	VfL Wolfsburg	**2014–15**, **2019–20**
Germany (18)	1	Hamburger SV	**2009–10**
Germany (18)	1	Werder Bremen	**2009–10**
Germany (18)	1	FC Augsburg	**2015–16**
Germany (18)	1	Mainz 05	2016–17
Germany (18)	1	1. FC Köln	2017–18
Germany (18)	1	RB Leipzig	2018–19
Germany (18)	1	Union Berlin	**2022–23**
Italy (15)	11	Lazio	2009–10, **2011–12**, **2012–13**, **2013–14**, **2015–16**, **2017–18**, **2018–19**, 2019–20, 2021–22, 2022–23, **2024–25**
Italy (15)	8	Roma	**2009–10**, **2016–17**, **2019–20**, **2020–21**, **2022–23**, **2023–24**, **2024–25**, **2025–26**
Italy (15)	6	Napoli	**2010–11**, **2012–13**, **2014–15**, **2015–16**, **2020–21**, 2021–22
Italy (15)	4	Fiorentina	**2013–14**, **2014–15**, **2015–16**, **2016–17**
Italy (15)	4	Milan	**2017–18**, 2018–19, **2020–21**, 2026–27
Italy (15)	3	Inter Milan	**2012–13**, **2014–15**, 2016–17
Italy (15)	2	Udinese	**2011–12**, 2012–13
Italy (15)	2	Atalanta	**2017–18**, **2023–24**
Italy (15)	2	Juventus	2010–11, 2026–27
Italy (15)	1	Genoa	2009–10
Italy (15)	1	Palermo	2010–11
Italy (15)	1	Sampdoria	2010–11
Italy (15)	1	Torino	**2014–15**
Italy (15)	1	Sassuolo	2016–17
Italy (15)	1	Bologna	**2025–26**
Portugal (13)	10	Braga	**2011–12**, **2015–16**, 2016–17, **2017–18**, **2019–20**, **2020–21**, **2021–22**, 2022–23, 2024–25, **2025–26**
Portugal (13)	8	Sporting CP	**2009–10**, **2010–11**, **2011–12**, 2012–13, **2015–16**, **2018–19**, **2019–20**, **2023–24**
Portugal (13)	4	Porto	**2010–11**, **2019–20**, 2024–25, **2025–26**
Portugal (13)	3	Vitória de Guimarães	2013–14, 2017–18, 2019–20
Portugal (13)	3	Benfica	**2009–10**, **2020–21**, 2026–27
Portugal (13)	2	Estoril	2013–14, 2014–15
Portugal (13)	1	Nacional	2009–10
Portugal (13)	1	Marítimo	2012–13
Portugal (13)	1	Académica	2012–13
Portugal (13)	1	Paços de Ferreira	2013–14
Portugal (13)	1	Rio Ave	2014–15
Portugal (13)	1	Belenenses	2015–16
Portugal (13)	1	Torreense	2026–27
Spain (12)	9	Villarreal	**2009–10**, **2010–11**, **2014–15**, **2015–16**, **2016–17**, **2017–18**, **2018–19**, **2020–21**, **2023–24**
Spain (12)	7	Athletic Bilbao	**2009–10**, **2011–12**, 2012–13, **2015–16**, **2016–17**, **2017–18**, **2024–25**
Spain (12)	6	Real Betis	**2013–14**, **2018–19**, **2021–22**, **2022–23**, 2023–24, **2025–26**
Spain (12)	6	Real Sociedad	**2017–18**, **2020–21**, 2021–22, **2022–23**, **2024–25**, 2026–27
Spain (12)	5	Sevilla	**2010–11**, **2013–14**, **2014–15**, **2018–19**, **2019–20**
Spain (12)	3	Atlético Madrid	2010–11, **2011–12**, **2012–13**
Spain (12)	3	Celta Vigo	**2016–17**, **2025–26**, 2026–27
Spain (12)	2	Valencia	**2009–10**, **2013–14**
Spain (12)	2	Getafe	2010–11, **2019–20**
Spain (12)	1	Levante	**2012–13**
Spain (12)	1	Espanyol	**2019–20**
Spain (12)	1	Granada	**2020–21**
France (12)	7	Marseille	2012–13, **2015–16**, **2017–18**, 2018–19, 2021–22, **2023–24**, 2026–27
France (12)	7	Lyon	**2012–13**, **2013–14**, **2017–18**, **2021–22**, **2024–25**, **2025–26**, 2026–27
France (12)	6	Rennes	2011–12, **2018–19**, 2019–20, 2022–23, 2023–24, 2026–27
France (12)	5	Lille	**2009–10**, **2010–11**, 2014–15, **2020–21**, **2025–26**
France (12)	5	Nice	2016–17, **2017–18**, 2020–21, 2024–25, 2025–26
France (12)	4	Bordeaux	**2012–13**, 2013–14, 2015–16, 2018–19
France (12)	4	Saint-Étienne	2014–15, **2015–16**, **2016–17**, 2019–20
France (12)	3	Monaco	2015–16, **2021–22**, 2022–23
France (12)	2	Paris Saint-Germain	**2010–11**, 2011–12
France (12)	2	Toulouse	2009–10, 2023–24
France (12)	1	Guingamp	**2014–15**
France (12)	1	Nantes	2022–23
Netherlands (11)	10	PSV Eindhoven	**2009–10**, **2010–11**, **2011–12**, 2012–13, 2013–14, **2014–15**, 2019–20, **2020–21**, 2021–22, 2022–23
Netherlands (11)	9	AZ	2010–11, **2011–12**, **2013–14**, 2015–16, **2016–17**, **2019–20**, 2020–21, **2024–25**, 2026–27
Netherlands (11)	6	Feyenoord	**2014–15**, 2016–17, 2019–20, 2020–21, **2022–23**, 2025–26
Netherlands (11)	5	Ajax	**2009–10**, 2015–16, **2016–17**, 2023–24, **2024–25**
Netherlands (11)	4	Twente	**2009–10**, **2011–12**, 2012–13, 2024–25
Netherlands (11)	2	Utrecht	2010–11, 2025–26
Netherlands (11)	1	Heerenveen	2009–10
Netherlands (11)	1	Groningen	2015–16
Netherlands (11)	1	Vitesse	2017–18
Netherlands (11)	1	Go Ahead Eagles	2025–26
Netherlands (11)	1	NEC Nijmegen	2026–27
Belgium (9)	8	Anderlecht	**2009–10**, **2010–11**, **2011–12**, **2015–16**, **2016–17**, 2018–19, 2024–25, 2026–27
Belgium (9)	7	Standard Liège	**2011–12**, 2013–14, 2014–15, 2016–17, 2018–19, 2019–20, 2020–21
Belgium (9)	6	Club Brugge	**2009–10**, 2010–11, **2011–12**, 2012–13, **2014–15**, 2015–16
Belgium (9)	6	Genk	**2012–13**, **2013–14**, **2016–17**, **2018–19**, 2021–22, **2025–26**
Belgium (9)	4	Gent	2010–11, **2016–17**, **2019–20**, 2020–21
Belgium (9)	4	Union Saint-Gilloise	**2022–23**, 2023–24, 2024–25, 2026–27
Belgium (9)	2	Zulte Waregem	2013–14, 2017–18
Belgium (9)	2	Antwerp	**2020–21**, 2021–22
Belgium (9)	1	Lokeren	2014–15
Turkey (9)	9	Fenerbahçe	**2009–10**, **2012–13**, **2015–16**, **2016–17**, **2018–19**, 2021–22, **2022–23**, **2024–25**, 2025–26
Turkey (9)	8	Beşiktaş	**2010–11**, **2011–12**, **2014–15**, 2015–16, 2018–19, 2019–20, 2024–25, 2026–27
Turkey (9)	4	Trabzonspor	**2013–14**, **2014–15**, 2019–20, 2022–23
Turkey (9)	3	Galatasaray	**2009–10**, **2021–22**, 2024–25
Turkey (9)	2	Konyaspor	2016–17, 2017–18
Turkey (9)	2	İstanbul Başakşehir	2017–18, **2019–20**
Turkey (9)	1	Ankaraspor	**2016–17**
Turkey (9)	1	Akhisarspor	2018–19
Turkey (9)	1	Sivasspor	2020–21
Ukraine (9)	9	Dynamo Kyiv	**2010–11**, 2011–12, **2013–14**, **2014–15**, **2017–18**, **2018–19**, 2019–20, 2022–23, 2024–25
Ukraine (9)	4	Metalist Kharkiv	**2010–11**, **2011–12**, **2012–13**, 2014–15
Ukraine (9)	4	Dnipro Dnipropetrovsk	**2012–13**, **2013–14**, **2014–15**, 2015–16
Ukraine (9)	3	Zorya Luhansk	2016–17, 2017–18, 2020–21
Ukraine (9)	2	Shakhtar Donetsk	**2009–10**, **2016–17**
Ukraine (9)	2	Vorskla Poltava	2011–12, 2018–19
Ukraine (9)	1	Karpaty Lviv	2010–11
Ukraine (9)	1	Chornomorets Odesa	**2013–14**
Ukraine (9)	1	Oleksandriya	2019–20
Russia (9)	5	Krasnodar	2014–15, **2015–16**, **2016–17**, **2018–19**, 2019–20
Russia (9)	4	Rubin Kazan	**2011–12**, **2012–13**, **2013–14**, 2015–16
Russia (9)	4	Zenit Saint Petersburg	**2010–11**, **2016–17**, **2017–18**, **2018–19**
Russia (9)	4	Lokomotiv Moscow	**2011–12**, **2015–16**, **2017–18**, 2021–22
Russia (9)	3	CSKA Moscow	**2010–11**, 2019–20, 2020–21
Russia (9)	2	Anzhi Makhachkala	**2012–13**, **2013–14**
Russia (9)	2	Spartak Moscow	2018–19, **2021–22**
Russia (9)	1	Kuban Krasnodar	2013–14
Russia (9)	1	Dynamo Moscow	**2014–15**
Switzerland (9)	8	Young Boys	**2010–11**, 2012–13, **2014–15**, 2016–17, 2017–18, 2019–20, **2020–21**, 2025–26
Switzerland (9)	5	Zürich	2011–12, 2014–15, 2016–17, **2018–19**, 2022–23
Switzerland (9)	5	Basel	2009–10, **2012–13**, **2015–16**, **2019–20**, 2025–26
Switzerland (9)	2	Lugano	2017–18, 2019–20
Switzerland (9)	1	Lausanne-Sport	2010–11
Switzerland (9)	1	St. Gallen	2013–14
Switzerland (9)	1	Thun	2013–14
Switzerland (9)	1	Sion	**2015–16**
Switzerland (9)	1	Servette	2023–24
Romania (8)	9	FCSB	2009–10, 2010–11, **2011–12**, **2012–13**, 2014–15, 2016–17, **2017–18**, **2024–25**, 2025–26
Romania (8)	3	CFR Cluj	2009–10, **2019–20**, 2020–21
Romania (8)	2	Astra Giurgiu	2014–15, **2016–17**
Romania (8)	1	Dinamo București	2009–10
Romania (8)	1	Poli Timişoara	2009–10
Romania (8)	1	Vaslui	2011–12
Romania (8)	1	Rapid București	2011–12
Romania (8)	1	Pandurii Târgu Jiu	2013–14
Greece (7)	10	PAOK	**2010–11**, **2011–12**, **2013–14**, 2014–15, 2015–16, **2016–17**, 2018–19, 2020–21, 2024–25, 2025–26
Greece (7)	7	Olympiacos	**2016–17**, **2018–19**, 2021–22, 2022–23, 2023–24, **2024–25**, 2026–27
Greece (7)	6	AEK Athens	2009–10, 2010–11, 2011–12, **2017–18**, 2020–21, 2023–24
Greece (7)	6	Panathinaikos	**2009–10**, 2012–13, 2014–15, 2016–17, 2023–24, **2025–26**
Greece (7)	2	Asteras Tripolis	2014–15, 2015–16
Greece (7)	1	Aris Thessaloniki	**2010–11**
Greece (7)	1	OFI Crete	2026–27
Norway (7)	6	Rosenborg	2010–11, 2012–13, 2015–16, 2017–18, 2018–19, 2019–20
Norway (7)	4	Molde	2012–13, **2015–16**, **2020–21**, 2023–24
Norway (7)	2	Bodø/Glimt	2022–23, **2024–25**
Norway (7)	1	Tromsø	2013–14
Norway (7)	1	Sarpsborg 08	2018–19
Norway (7)	1	Brann	2025–26
Norway (7)	1	Lillestrøm	2026–27
Austria (6)	10	Red Bull Salzburg	**2009–10**, 2010–11, **2011–12**, **2013–14**, **2014–15**, 2016–17, **2017–18**, **2018–19**, 2025–26, 2026–27
Austria (6)	9	Rapid Wien	2009–10, 2010–11, 2012–13, 2013–14, **2015–16**, 2016–17, **2018–19**, 2020–21, 2021–22
Austria (6)	7	Sturm Graz	2009–10, 2011–12, 2021–22, 2022–23, 2023–24, 2025–26, 2026–27
Austria (6)	4	Austria Wien	2009–10, 2011–12, 2016–17, 2017–18
Austria (6)	3	LASK	**2019–20**, 2020–21, 2023–24
Austria (6)	2	Wolfsberger AC	2019–20, **2020–21**
Czech Republic (6)	10	Sparta Prague	2009–10, **2010–11**, **2012–13**, 2014–15, **2015–16**, **2016–17**, 2020–21, 2021–22, **2023–24**, 2026–27
Czech Republic (6)	7	Viktoria Plzeň	**2012–13**, 2015–16, 2016–17, **2017–18**, **2024–25**, 2025–26, 2026–27
Czech Republic (6)	6	Slavia Prague	2009–10, 2017–18, **2018–19**, **2020–21**, **2023–24**, 2024–25
Czech Republic (6)	4	Slovan Liberec	**2013–14**, 2015–16, 2016–17, 2020–21
Czech Republic (6)	1	Zlín	2017–18
Czech Republic (6)	1	Jablonec	2018–19
Denmark (6)	7	Copenhagen	**2009–10**, 2011–12, 2012–13, 2014–15, **2017–18**, 2018–19, **2019–20**
Denmark (6)	5	Midtjylland	**2015–16**, 2021–22, 2022–23, 2024–25, **2025–26**
Denmark (6)	2	Odense	2010–11, 2011–12
Denmark (6)	1	Esbjerg	**2013–14**
Denmark (6)	1	AaB	**2014–15**
Denmark (6)	1	Brøndby	2021–22
Cyprus (6)	4	Apollon Limassol	2013–14, 2014–15, 2017–18, 2018–19
Cyprus (6)	4	APOEL	2013–14, 2015–16, **2016–17**, **2019–20**
Cyprus (6)	3	AEK Larnaca	2011–12, 2018–19, 2022–23
Cyprus (6)	3	Omonia	2020–21, 2022–23, 2026–27
Cyprus (6)	1	AEL Limassol	2012–13
Cyprus (6)	1	Aris Limassol	2023–24
Sweden (6)	6	Malmö FF	2011–12, **2018–19**, **2019–20**, 2022–23, 2024–25, 2025–26
Sweden (6)	2	IF Elfsborg	2013–14, 2024–25
Sweden (6)	1	AIK	2012–13
Sweden (6)	1	Helsingborgs IF	2012–13
Sweden (6)	1	Östersunds FK	**2017–18**
Sweden (6)	1	BK Häcken	2023–24
Israel (5)	7	Maccabi Tel Aviv	2011–12, **2013–14**, 2016–17, 2017–18, **2020–21**, 2024–25, 2025–26
Israel (5)	4	Hapoel Be'er Sheva	**2016–17**, 2017–18, 2020–21, 2026–27
Israel (5)	3	Hapoel Tel Aviv	**2009–10**, 2011–12, 2012–13
Israel (5)	3	Maccabi Haifa	2011–12, 2013–14, 2023–24
Israel (5)	1	Ironi Kiryat Shmona	2012–13
Poland (5)	5	Legia Warsaw	**2011–12**, 2013–14, **2014–15**, 2015–16, 2021–22
Poland (5)	4	Lech Poznań	**2010–11**, 2015–16, 2020–21, 2026–27
Poland (5)	1	Wisła Kraków	**2011–12**
Poland (5)	1	Raków Częstochowa	2023–24
Poland (5)	1	Jagiellonia Białystok	2026–27
Bulgaria (3)	9	Ludogorets Razgrad	**2013–14**, **2017–18**, 2018–19, **2019–20**, 2020–21, 2021–22, 2022–23, 2024–25, 2025–26
Bulgaria (3)	3	CSKA Sofia	2009–10, 2010–11, 2020–21
Bulgaria (3)	3	Levski Sofia	2009–10, 2010–11, 2026–27
Croatia (3)	9	Dinamo Zagreb	2009–10, 2010–11, 2013–14, 2014–15, **2018–19**, **2020–21**, 2021–22, 2025–26, 2026–27
Croatia (3)	4	Rijeka	2013–14, 2014–15, 2017–18, 2020–21
Croatia (3)	1	Hajduk Split	2010–11
Azerbaijan (3)	9	Qarabağ	2014–15, 2015–16, 2016–17, 2018–19, 2019–20, 2020–21, 2022–23, **2023–24**, 2024–25
Azerbaijan (3)	2	Gabala	2015–16, 2016–17
Azerbaijan (3)	1	Neftçi	2012–13
Serbia (3)	6	Partizan	2009–10, 2012–13, 2014–15, 2015–16, **2017–18**, 2019–20
Serbia (3)	5	Red Star Belgrade	**2017–18**, **2020–21**, **2021–22**, 2022–23, 2025–26
Serbia (3)	1	TSC	2023–24
Hungary (3)	6	Ferencváros	2019–20, 2021–22, **2022–23**, 2024–25, **2025–26**, 2026–27
Hungary (3)	2	Videoton	2012–13, 2018–19
Hungary (3)	1	Debrecen	2010–11
Scotland (2)	10	Celtic	2009–10, 2011–12, **2014–15**, 2015–16, **2018–19**, **2019–20**, 2020–21, 2021–22, 2025–26, 2026–27
Scotland (2)	7	Rangers	2018–19, **2019–20**, **2020–21**, **2021–22**, **2023–24**, **2024–25**, 2025–26
Belarus (2)	4	BATE Borisov	2009–10, **2010–11**, 2017–18, **2018–19**
Belarus (2)	2	Dinamo Minsk	2014–15, 2015–16
Kazakhstan (2)	4	Astana	2016–17, **2017–18**, 2018–19, 2019–20
Kazakhstan (2)	1	Shakhter Karagandy	2013–14
Slovakia (2)	3	Slovan Bratislava	2011–12, 2014–15, 2019–20
Slovakia (2)	1	Spartak Trnava	2018–19
Slovenia (2)	3	Maribor	2011–12, 2012–13, **2013–14**
Slovenia (2)	1	Celje	2026–27
Republic of Ireland (2)	2	Dundalk	2016–17, 2020–21
Republic of Ireland (2)	1	Shamrock Rovers	2011–12
Latvia (2)	1	Ventspils	2009–10
Latvia (2)	1	RFS	2024–25
Moldova (1)	6	Sheriff Tiraspol	2009–10, 2010–11, 2013–14, 2017–18, 2022–23, 2023–24
Albania (1)	2	Skënderbeu	2015–16, 2017–18
Luxembourg (1)	2	F91 Dudelange	2018–19, 2019–20
Finland (1)	2	HJK	2014–15, 2022–23
North Macedonia (1)	1	Vardar	2017–18
Armenia (1)	1	Ararat-Armenia	2026–27

=== Number of participating clubs in the group stage of the UEFA Cup era ===
Season in bold represents teams that qualified for the knockout phase.

Nation	No.	Clubs	Years
France (13)	2	Auxerre	**2004–05**, 2006–07
France (13)	2	Lens	**2005–06**, **2006–07**
France (13)	2	Rennes	2005–06, 2007–08
France (13)	2	Paris Saint-Germain	**2006–07**, **2008–09**
France (13)	2	Nancy	**2006–07**, 2008–09
France (13)	1	Lille	**2004–05**
France (13)	1	Sochaux	**2004–05**
France (13)	1	Marseille	**2005–06**
France (13)	1	Monaco	**2005–06**
France (13)	1	Strasbourg	**2005–06**
France (13)	1	Bordeaux	**2007–08**
France (13)	1	Toulouse	2007–08
France (13)	1	Saint-Étienne	**2008–09**
Spain (12)	4	Sevilla	**2004–05**, **2005–06**, **2006–07**, 2008–09
Spain (12)	2	Espanyol	**2005–06**, **2006–07**
Spain (12)	2	Villarreal	**2004–05**, **2007–08**
Spain (12)	1	Athletic Bilbao	**2004–05**
Spain (12)	1	Zaragoza	**2004–05**
Spain (12)	1	Celta Vigo	**2006–07**
Spain (12)	1	Osasuna	**2006–07**
Spain (12)	1	Atlético Madrid	**2007–08**
Spain (12)	1	Getafe	**2007–08**
Spain (12)	1	Deportivo A Coruña	**2008–09**
Spain (12)	1	Valencia	**2008–09**
Spain (12)	1	Racing Santander	2008–09
Germany (10)	3	VfB Stuttgart	**2004–05**, **2005–06**, **2008–09**
Germany (10)	3	Hamburger SV	**2005–06**, **2007–08**, **2008–09**
Germany (10)	2	Bayer Leverkusen	**2006–07**, **2007–08**
Germany (10)	2	Schalke 04	**2004–05**, 2008–09
Germany (10)	2	Hertha BSC	**2005–06**, 2008–09
Germany (10)	1	Alemannia Aachen	**2004–05**
Germany (10)	1	Eintracht Frankfurt	2006–07
Germany (10)	1	1. FC Nürnberg	**2007–08**
Germany (10)	1	Bayern Munich	**2007–08**
Germany (10)	1	VfL Wolfsburg	**2008–09**
England (9)	3	Tottenham Hotspur	**2006–07**, **2007–08**, **2008–09**
England (9)	2	Middlesbrough	**2004–05**, **2005–06**
England (9)	2	Newcastle United	**2004–05**, **2006–07**
England (9)	2	Bolton Wanderers	**2005–06**, **2007–08**
England (9)	1	Blackburn Rovers	**2006–07**
England (9)	1	Everton	**2007–08**
England (9)	1	Aston Villa	**2008–09**
England (9)	1	Manchester City	**2008–09**
England (9)	1	Portsmouth	2008–09
Italy (9)	2	Parma	**2004–05**, **2006–07**
Italy (9)	2	Palermo	**2005–06**, 2006–07
Italy (9)	2	Sampdoria	2005–06, **2008–09**
Italy (9)	1	Lazio	2004–05
Italy (9)	1	Roma	**2005–06**
Italy (9)	1	Livorno	**2006–07**
Italy (9)	1	Fiorentina	**2007–08**
Italy (9)	1	Milan	**2008–09**
Italy (9)	1	Udinese	**2008–09**
Greece (8)	2	AEK Athens	2004–05, **2007–08**
Greece (8)	2	Panionios	2004–05, 2007–08
Greece (8)	2	Panathinaikos	**2006–07**, **2007–08**
Greece (8)	1	Egaleo	2004–05
Greece (8)	1	PAOK	2005–06
Greece (8)	1	Aris Thessaloniki	2007–08
Greece (8)	1	AEL Larissa	2007–08
Greece (8)	1	Olympiacos	**2008–09**
Netherlands (7)	4	AZ	**2004–05**, **2005–06**, **2006–07**, 2007–08
Netherlands (7)	4	Heerenveen	**2004–05**, **2005–06**, 2006–07, 2008–09
Netherlands (7)	3	Feyenoord	**2004–05**, **2006–07**, 2008–09
Netherlands (7)	2	Ajax	**2006–07**, **2008–09**
Netherlands (7)	1	Utrecht	2004–05
Netherlands (7)	1	NEC Nijmegen	**2008–09**
Netherlands (7)	1	Twente	**2008–09**
Belgium (5)	3	Club Brugge	2004–05, 2006–07, 2008–09
Belgium (5)	2	Standard Liège	2004–05, **2008–09**
Belgium (5)	1	Beveren	2004–05
Belgium (5)	1	Zulte Waregem	**2006–07**
Belgium (5)	1	Anderlecht	**2007–08**
Russia (4)	3	Zenit Saint Petersburg	2004–05, **2005–06**, **2007–08**
Russia (4)	2	Lokomotiv Moscow	**2005–06**, 2007–08
Russia (4)	2	CSKA Moscow	2005–06, **2008–09**
Russia (4)	2	Spartak Moscow	**2007–08**, 2008–09
Czech Republic (4)	2	Mladá Boleslav	2006–07, 2007–08
Czech Republic (4)	2	Sparta Prague	2006–07, 2007–08
Czech Republic (4)	2	Slavia Prague	**2005–06**, 2008–09
Czech Republic (4)	1	Slovan Liberec	2006–07
Portugal (4)	3	Braga	**2006–07**, **2007–08**, **2008–09**
Portugal (4)	2	Benfica	**2004–05**, 2008–09
Portugal (4)	1	Sporting CP	**2004–05**
Portugal (4)	1	Vitória de Guimarães	2005–06
Denmark (4)	2	Copenhagen	2007–08, **2008–09**
Denmark (4)	1	Brøndby	2005–06
Denmark (4)	1	Odense	2006–07
Denmark (4)	1	AaB	2007–08
Norway (4)	1	Tromsø	2005–06
Norway (4)	1	Viking	2005–06
Norway (4)	1	Brann	**2007–08**
Norway (4)	1	Rosenborg	2008–09
Switzerland (3)	4	Basel	**2004–05**, **2005–06**, 2006–07, **2007–08**
Switzerland (3)	2	Grasshopper	2005–06, 2006–07
Switzerland (3)	1	Zürich	**2007–08**
Romania (3)	2	FCSB	**2004–05**, **2005–06**
Romania (3)	2	Dinamo București	2005–06, **2006–07**
Romania (3)	2	Rapid București	**2005–06**, 2006–07
Turkey (3)	3	Beşiktaş	2004–05, 2005–06, 2006–07
Turkey (3)	2	Galatasaray	**2007–08**, **2008–09**
Turkey (3)	1	Fenerbahçe	**2006–07**
Scotland (3)	2	Rangers	2004–05, **2006–07**
Scotland (3)	1	Heart of Midlothian	2004–05
Scotland (3)	1	Aberdeen	**2007–08**
Israel (3)	2	Hapoel Tel Aviv	**2006–07**, 2007–08
Israel (3)	1	Maccabi Petah Tikva	2005–06
Israel (3)	1	Maccabi Haifa	**2006–07**
Ukraine (3)	2	Dnipro Dnipropetrovsk	**2004–05**, 2005–06
Ukraine (3)	1	Shakhtar Donetsk	**2005–06**
Ukraine (3)	1	Metalist Kharkiv	**2008–09**
Bulgaria (3)	1	Levski Sofia	**2005–06**
Bulgaria (3)	1	Litex Lovech	**2005–06**
Bulgaria (3)	1	CSKA Sofia	2005–06
Sweden (3)	1	Halmstads BK	2005–06
Sweden (3)	1	IF Elfsborg	2007–08
Sweden (3)	1	Helsingborgs IF	**2007–08**
Poland (3)	1	Amica Wronki	2004–05
Poland (3)	1	Wisła Kraków	2006–07
Poland (3)	1	Lech Poznań	**2008–09**
Serbia (2)	3	Partizan	**2004–05**, 2006–07, 2008–09
Serbia (2)	2	Red Star Belgrade	2005–06, 2007–08
Austria (2)	3	Austria Wien	**2004–05**, 2006–07, 2007–08
Austria (2)	1	GAK	**2004–05**
Croatia (1)	3	Dinamo Zagreb	2004–05, 2007–08, 2008–09
(Georgia (country)) Georgia (1)	1	Dinamo Tbilisi	2004–05
Hungary (1)	1	Ferencváros	2004–05
Slovakia (1)	1	Žilina	2008–09

== Club appearances ==
=== By semi-final appearances ===
Team in **bold**	=	Finalist team in season

Team	No.	Years
(Italy) Inter Milan	8	1985, 1986, **1991**, **1994**, **1997**, **1998**, 2002, **2020**
(Italy) Juventus	7	1975, **1977**, **1990**, **1993**, **1995**, 2014, 2023
(Spain) Sevilla	7	**2006**, **2007**, **2014**, **2015**, **2016**, **2020**, **2023**
(Germany) Borussia Mönchengladbach	5	**1973**, **1975**, **1979**, **1980**, 1987
(England) Liverpool	5	**1973**, **1976**, **2001**, 2010, **2016**
(England) Tottenham Hotspur	5	**1972**, 1973, **1974**, **1984**, **2025**
(Spain) Atlético Madrid	5	1998, 1999, **2010**, **2012**, **2018**
(Germany) 1. FC Köln	4	1975, 1981, **1986**, 1990
(Spain) Barcelona	4	1976, 1978, 1996, 2001
(Germany) Hamburger SV	4	1976, **1982**, 2009, 2010
(Germany) Bayern Munich	4	1980, 1989, **1996**, 2008
(Portugal) Benfica	4	**1983**, 2011, **2013**, **2014**
(Germany) Werder Bremen	4	1988, 1990, 2007, **2009**
(Germany) Bayer Leverkusen	4	**1988**, 1995, 2023, **2024**
(Italy) Roma	4	**1991**, 2021, **2023**, 2024
(France) Marseille	4	**1999**, **2004**, **2018**, 2024
(England) Arsenal	4	**2000**, 2018, **2019**, 2021
(Spain) Villarreal	4	2004, 2011, 2016, **2021**
(Spain) Valencia	4	**2004**, 2012, 2014, 2019
(England) Manchester United	4	**2017**, 2020, **2021**, **2025**
(Germany) Eintracht Frankfurt	3	**1980**, 2019, **2022**
(Spain) Real Madrid	3	**1985**, **1986**, 1992
(Germany) VfB Stuttgart	3	1974, 1980, **1989**
(Spain) Athletic Bilbao	3	**1977**, **2012**, 2025
(Italy) Fiorentina	3	**1990**, 2008, 2015
(Germany) Borussia Dortmund	3	**1993**, 1995, **2002**
(Italy) Parma	3	**1995**, **1999**, 2005
(Portugal) Sporting CP	3	1991, **2005**, 2012
(Ukraine) Shakhtar Donetsk	3	**2009**, 2016, 2020
(Italy) Milan	2	1972, 2002
(Netherlands) Twente	2	1973, **1975**
(Netherlands) Feyenoord	2	**1974**, **2002**
(Belgium) Club Brugge	2	**1976**, 1988
(Netherlands) AZ	2	**1981**, 2005
(Sweden) IFK Göteborg	2	**1982**, **1987**
(Germany) 1. FC Kaiserslautern	2	1982, 2001
(Belgium) Anderlecht	2	**1983**, **1984**
(England) Nottingham Forest	2	1984, 2026
(Spain) Espanyol	2	**1988**, **2007**
(Italy) Napoli	2	**1989**, 2015
(Netherlands) Ajax	2	**1992**, **2017**
(Austria) Red Bull Salzburg	2	**1994**, 2018
(Germany) Schalke 04	2	**1997**, 2006
(Italy) Lazio	2	**1998**, 2003
(Portugal) Porto	2	**2003**, **2011**
(Scotland) Rangers	2	**2008**, **2022**
(Portugal) Braga	2	**2011**, 2026
(England) Chelsea	2	**2013**, **2019**
(Hungary) Ferencváros	1	1972
(England) Wolverhampton Wanderers	1	**1972**
(Germany) Lokomotive Leipzig	1	1974
(Greece) AEK Athens	1	1977
(Belgium) Molenbeek	1	1977
(Switzerland) Grasshopper	1	1978
(Netherlands) PSV Eindhoven	1	**1978**
(France) Bastia	1	**1978**
(Germany) Duisburg	1	1979
(Germany) Hertha BSC	1	1979
(Serbia) Red Star Belgrade	1	**1979**
(France) Sochaux	1	1981
(England) Ipswich Town	1	**1981**
(Serbia) Radnički Niš	1	1982
(Romania) Universitatea Craiova	1	1983
(Czech Republic) Bohemians	1	1983
(Croatia) Hajduk Split	1	1984
(Bosnia and Herzegovina) Željezničar	1	1985
(Hungary) Videoton	1	**1985**
(Belgium) Waregem	1	1986
(Austria) Swarovski Tirol	1	1987
(Scotland) Dundee United	1	**1987**
(Germany) Dynamo Dresden	1	1989
(Denmark) Brøndby	1	1991
(Italy) Genoa	1	1992
(Italy) Torino	1	**1992**
(France) Paris Saint-Germain	1	1993
(France) Auxerre	1	1993
(Germany) Karlsruher SC	1	1994
(Italy) Cagliari	1	1994
(Czech Republic) Slavia Prague	1	1996
(France) Bordeaux	1	**1996**
(Spain) Tenerife	1	1997
(France) Monaco	1	1997
(Russia) Spartak Moscow	1	1998
(Italy) Bologna	1	1999
(France) Lens	1	2000
(England) Leeds United	1	2000
(Turkey) Galatasaray	1	**2000**
(Spain) Alavés	1	**2001**
(Portugal) Boavista	1	2003
(Scotland) Celtic	1	**2003**
(England) Newcastle United	1	2004
(Russia) CSKA Moscow	1	**2005**
(Romania) FCSB	1	2006
(England) Middlesbrough	1	**2006**
(Spain) Osasuna	1	2007
(Russia) Zenit Saint Petersburg	1	**2008**
(Ukraine) Dynamo Kyiv	1	2009
(England) Fulham	1	**2010**
(Switzerland) Basel	1	2013
(Turkey) Fenerbahçe	1	2013
(Ukraine) Dnipro Dnipropetrovsk	1	**2015**
(France) Lyon	1	2017
(Spain) Celta Vigo	1	2017
(Germany) RB Leipzig	1	2022
(England) West Ham United	1	2022
(Italy) Atalanta	1	**2024**
(Norway) Bodø/Glimt	1	2025
(England) Aston Villa	1	**2026**
(Germany) SC Freiburg	1	**2026**

=== Consecutive appearances ===
As of 23 July 2026

Entries	Club	Seasons
20	Club Brugge	1996–97 to 2015–16
16	Sparta Prague	2006–07 to 2021–22
14	Hajduk Split	2007–08 to 2020–21
14	Rosenborg	2007–08 to 2020–21
13	Vaduz	1999–2000 to 2011–12
13	Omonia	2004–05 to 2016–17
12	Slavia Prague	1998–99 to 2009–10
12	Ajax	2006–07 to 2017–18
12	PAOK	2009–10 to 2020–21
11	Litex Lovech	2001–02 to 2011–12
11	Viktoria Plzeň	2010–11 to 2020–21
11	Legia Warsaw	2011–12 to 2021–22
11	Braga	2015–16 to 2025–26
10	CSKA Sofia	1998–99 to 2007–08
10	Dinamo București	2003–04 to 2012–13
10	Nõmme Kalju	2011–12 to 2020–21
10	Partizan	2011–12 to 2020–21
10	Shakhtyor Soligorsk	2011–12 to 2020–21

Bold = Ongoing streak

== Cities ==
- Cities at the geographical extremes:
  - Easternmost: (Russia) Novosibirsk – Sibir Novosibirsk
  - Southernmost: (Spain) Las Palmas de Gran Canaria – Las Palmas
  - Northernmost: (Norway) Tromsø – Tromsø
  - Westernmost: (Iceland) Reykjanesbær – Keflavík

== Undefeated champions ==
- Nine teams have won the tournament undefeated in UEFA Cup history:
  - Tottenham Hotspur (1972)
  - Borussia Mönchengladbach (1979)
  - Göteborg (1982, 1987)
  - Ajax (1992)
  - Galatasaray (2000)
  - Feyenoord (2002)
  - Chelsea (2019)
  - Villarreal (2021)
  - Eintracht Frankfurt (2022)

== Consecutive wins ==
- Atlético Madrid hold the record of most consecutive wins (both home and away) with 15 spanning the 2011–12 and 2012–13 seasons.

== Miscellaneous records ==
- Only four clubs have won the treble of their national league championship, domestic cup competition and the UEFA Cup all in the same season:
  - IFK Göteborg (1982)
  - Galatasaray (2000)
  - Porto (2003, 2011)
  - CSKA Moscow (2005)
- In addition to the above, nine clubs (including IFK Göteborg again, and Liverpool doing so twice) won their national league championship and the UEFA Cup in the same season:
  - Liverpool (1973, 1976)
  - IFK Göteborg (1987)
  - Feyenoord (1974)
  - Borussia Mönchengladbach (1975)
  - Juventus (1977)
  - PSV Eindhoven (1978)
  - Real Madrid (1986)
  - Valencia (2004)
  - Zenit Saint Petersburg (2008)
- Until 1997, the UEFA Cup was the only European club competition which routinely allocated multiple entrants to many countries. This has led to several finals featuring two clubs from the same country:

Year	Country	Final		
1972	England	Tottenham Hotspur	3–2 agg.	Wolverhampton Wanderers
1980	West Germany	Eintracht Frankfurt	3–3 agg. (a)	Borussia Mönchengladbach
1990	Italy	Juventus	3–1 agg.	Fiorentina
1991	Italy	Inter Milan	2–1 agg.	Roma
1995	Italy	Parma	2–1 agg.	Juventus
1998	Italy	Inter Milan	3–0	Lazio
2007	Spain	Sevilla	2–2 (a.e.t.) (3–1 p)	Espanyol
2011	Portugal	Porto	1–0	Braga
2012	Spain	Atlético Madrid	3–0	Athletic Bilbao
2019	England	Chelsea	4–1	Arsenal
2025	England	Tottenham Hotspur	1–0	Manchester United

- During the 1979–80 season, West Germany had five entrants including cup holders Borussia Mönchengladbach. All five managed to reach the quarter-final stage and both semi-finals ended up being all-West German affairs. Ultimately, Eintracht Frankfurt defeated Borussia Mönchengladbach in the final. No West German club that season was eliminated by a non-German club.
- During the 1997–98 season, France had seven entrants: Strasbourg as winner of the Coupe de la Ligue, Nantes, Bordeaux and Metz as third, fourth and fifth placed respectively in Division 1, and also Auxerre, Bastia and Lyon as 1997 UEFA Intertoto Cup Group winners. Nevertheless, only Auxerre reached the quarter-finals, where they were eliminated by Lazio.
- Sevilla are the only club to win the UEFA Cup/Europa League three times consecutively, in 2014, 2015 and 2016. Real Madrid were the first club to win two in a row in 1985 and 1986, matched by Sevilla in 2006 and 2007.
- Only two countries have provided the champion in three consecutive seasons:
  - Italy: between 1988–89 and 1990–91 (Napoli, Juventus and Inter Milan the winners) and between 1992–93 and 1994–95 (Juventus, Inter Milan and Parma).
  - Spain: 2014, 2015 and 2016 (all Sevilla).
- Entering both the Champions League and/or its qualifying rounds and the UEFA Cup in the same season became so common that a separate statistic of all clubs having done so in three or more consecutive seasons may be of interest (the means of entering the UEFA Cup is indicated in the last column in chronological order, G denoting group stage, q denoting qualifying round):

Entries	Club	Seasons	Stages
6	Shakhtar Donetsk	2000–01 to 2005–06	GqqqGq
3	Rangers	1999–00 to 2001–02	GGq
3	Celtic	2000–01 to 2003–04	GqG
3	GAK	2002–03 to 2004–05	qqq
3	Club Brugge	2002–03 to 2004–05	qGq
3	Wisła Kraków	2003–04 to 2005–06	qqq

- Several times, winning the UEFA Cup was a club's only chance to qualify for European competition in the next season. A win by such a mid-table (and non-domestic-cup-winning) club then led to an extra place in the UEFA Cup (or an extra place in the UEFA Champions League since 2015) for the country in question. The following clubs managed to 'save their season' by winning the UEFA Cup:

Season	Club	Country	Domestic position
1971–72	Tottenham Hotspur	England	6th
1978–79	Borussia Mönchengladbach	West Germany	10th
1979–80	Eintracht Frankfurt	West Germany	9th
1983–84	Tottenham Hotspur	England	8th
1987–88	Bayer Leverkusen	West Germany	8th
1993–94	Inter Milan	Italy	13th
1996–97	Schalke 04	Germany	12th
2021–22	Eintracht Frankfurt	Germany	11th
2022–23	Sevilla	Spain	12th
2024–25	Tottenham Hotspur	England	17th

== Highest attendances ==
=== Overall (UEFA Cup/Europa League) ===
1. 110,000 – Real Madrid 0–0 Ipswich Town, 3 October 1973, First round second leg

2. 93,000 – Real Madrid 2–1 Torino, 1 April 1992, Semi-finals first leg

3. 92,000 – Dynamo Kyiv 1–1 Eintracht Braunschweig, 14 September 1977, First round first leg

4. 90,832 – Barcelona 0–0 Liverpool, 5 April 2001, Semi-finals first leg

=== Europa League only ===
1. 90,225 – Barcelona 2–2 Manchester United, 16 February 2023, Knockout round play-offs first leg

2. 80,465 – Tottenham Hotspur 2–2 Gent, 23 February 2017, Round of 32 second leg

3. 79,468 – Barcelona 2–3 Eintracht Frankfurt, 14 April 2022, Quarter-finals second leg

4. 75,180 – Manchester United 1–1 Liverpool, 17 March 2016, Round of 16 second leg

5. 75,138 – Manchester United 1–1 Celta Vigo, 11 May 2017, Semi-finals second leg

== Individuals' goals ==
=== Most goals in a single match ===
The record for most goals scored in a single match across all UEFA Cup/Europa League seasons is held by Eldar Hadžimehmedović, after he scored six goals for Lyn against NSÍ Runavík in the 2003–04 qualifying round.

Europa League only

Goals	Player(s)
5	Aritz Aduriz
4	Radamel Falcao, Edinson Cavani, Willian José, Patson Daka
3	66 players

=== Most goals in a single season ===
UEFA Cup and Europa League

Goals	Player(s)
17	Radamel Falcao
15	Jürgen Klinsmann
14	Ruud Geels, John Wark, Alfredo Morelos
12	Radamel Falcao, Derlei, Jupp Heynckes, Jan Jeuring
11	Alan Shearer, Walter Pandiani, Vágner Love, Stan Bowles, Lex Schoenmaker, Giuseppe Rossi, Henrik Larsson, Olivier Giroud
10	Jupp Heynckes, Rudi Völler, Ludwig Bründl, Luca Toni, Ulf Kirsten, Pavel Pogrebnyak, Darko Kovačević, Klaas-Jan Huntelaar, Aritz Aduriz, Luka Jović, Pierre-Emerick Aubameyang

=== Goals in different finals ===
UEFA Cup and Europa League

Player	Seasons
Wim Jonk	1992, 1994
Stefan Pettersson	1987, 1992
Iván Zamorano	1997, 1998
Frédéric Kanouté	2006, 2007
Radamel Falcao	2011, 2012

=== All-time top goalscorers ===
==== Including qualifying rounds ====
As of 6 March 2025
Players taking part in the 2024–25 UEFA Europa League (including qualifying rounds) are highlighted in bold.
Players still active but not in this year's Europa League are highlighted in italics.

Rank	Player	Goals	Apps	Ratio	Years	Club(s) (Goals)
1	(Sweden) Henrik Larsson	40	56	0.71	1994–2009	Feyenoord (1/6), Celtic (27/35), Helsingborg (12/15)
2	(Gabon) Pierre-Emerick Aubameyang	37	68	0.54	2009–	Lille (0/9), Borussia Dortmund (11/14), Arsenal (14/26), Barcelona (2/6), Marseille (10/13)
3	(Netherlands) Klaas-Jan Huntelaar	34	54	0.63	2004–2020	Heerenveen (5/13), Ajax (11/17), Schalke 04 (18/24)
4	(Colombia) Alfredo Morelos	32	62	0.52	2016–	HJK (4/6), Rangers (28/56)
5	(Colombia) Radamel Falcao	31	35	0.89	2009–	Porto (18/16), Atlético Madrid (13/17), Galatasaray (0/2)
5	(Spain) Aritz Aduriz	31	47	0.66	2011–2018	Valencia (0/6), Athletic Bilbao (31/41)
7	(Germany) Dieter Müller	29	36	0.81	1973–1984	1. FC Köln (25/31), VfB Stuttgart (1/2), Bordeaux (3/3)
8	(Bosnia and Herzegovina) Edin Džeko	28	60	0.47	2003–	Željezničar (0/1), VfL Wolfsburg (5/14), Manchester City (3/7), Roma (17/26), Fenerbahçe (3/11)
9	(Brazil) Vágner Love	27	44	0.61	2004–2022	CSKA Moscow (20/32), Beşiktaş (4/8), Kairat (3/4)
9	(Georgia (country)) Shota Arveladze	27	45	0.6	1993–2007	Dinamo Tbilisi (2/4), Trabzonspor (4/4), Ajax (10/13), Rangers (2/7), AZ (9/17)
9	(Belgium) Romelu Lukaku	27	46	0.59	2009–	Anderlecht (5/18), Everton (8/9), Inter Milan (7/6), Roma (7/13)
12	(Israel) Mu'nas Dabbur	26	57	0.46	2011–	Maccabi Tel Aviv (1/12), Red Bull Salzburg (16/30), Grasshopper (0/2), Sevilla (3/6), TSG Hoffenheim (6/7)
12	(France) Kevin Gameiro	26	57	0.46	2005–2019	Strasbourg (2/3), Paris Saint-Germain (1/7), Sevilla (18/34), Atlético Madrid (2/5), Valencia (3/8)
12	(France) Alexandre Lacazette	26	60	0.43	2012–	Lyon (13/33), Arsenal (13/27)
15	(England) Jermain Defoe	25	40	0.63	2006–2021	Tottenham Hotspur (20/28), Portsmouth (2/4), Rangers (3/8)
15	(Italy) Alessandro Altobelli	25	55	0.45	1977–1989	Inter Milan (21/50), Juventus (4/8)
15	(Netherlands) Ricky van Wolfswinkel	25	57	0.44	2010–	Utrecht (9/12), Sporting CP (9/20), Saint-Étienne (1/6), Basel (4/9), Twente (2/10)
15	(Croatia) Mladen Petrić	25	72	0.35	2004–2016	Grasshopper (1/11), Basel (8/26), Hamburger SV (15/27), Panathinaikos (1/8)
19	(Russia) Aleksandr Kerzhakov	24	44	0.55	2002–2017	Zenit Saint Petersburg (21/34), Sevilla (2/8), Dynamo Moscow (1/2)
19	(Colombia) Carlos Bacca	24	60	0.4	2012–	Club Brugge (3/7), Sevilla (14/31), Villarreal (7/22)
19	(North Macedonia) Ivan Trichkovski	24	67	0.36	2005–	Vardar (1/6), Rabotnički (0/6), Red Star Belgrade (0/2), APOEL (1/5), Club Brugge (1/3), Legia Warsaw (0/6), AEK Larnaca (21/39)

==== Excluding qualifying rounds ====
As of 6 March 2025
Players taking part in the 2024–25 UEFA Europa League are highlighted in bold.
Players still active but not in this year's Europa League are highlighted in italics.

Rank	Player	Goals	Apps	Ratio	Years	Club(s) (Goals)
1	(Gabon) Pierre-Emerick Aubameyang	34	62	0.55	2009–	Lille (0/7), Borussia Dortmund (8/10), Arsenal (14/26), Barcelona (2/6), Marseille (10/13)
2	(Sweden) Henrik Larsson	31	45	0.69	1994–2008	Feyenoord (1/6), Celtic (24/31), Helsingborg (6/8)
3	(Colombia) Radamel Falcao	30	31	0.97	2010–	Porto (17/14), Atlético Madrid (13/17)
3	(Netherlands) Klaas-Jan Huntelaar	30	50	0.6	2004–2020	Heerenveen (5/13), Ajax (11/15), Schalke 04 (14/22)
5	(Germany) Dieter Müller	29	36	0.81	1973–1984	1. FC Köln (25/31), VfB Stuttgart (1/2), Bordeaux (3/3)
6	(Bosnia and Herzegovina) Edin Džeko	28	59	0.47	2003–	Željezničar (0/1), VfL Wolfsburg (5/14), Manchester City (3/7), Roma (17/26), Fenerbahçe (3/11)
7	(Belgium) Romelu Lukaku	27	46	0.59	2009–	Anderlecht (5/18), Everton (8/9), Inter Milan (7/6), Roma (7/13)
8	(Spain) Aritz Aduriz	26	39	0.67	2012–2018	Valencia (0/6), Athletic Bilbao (26/33)
9	(France) Alexandre Lacazette	25	56	0.45	2012–	Lyon (12/29), Arsenal (13/27)
9	(Italy) Alessandro Altobelli	25	58	0.43	1977–1989	Inter Milan (21/50), Juventus (4/8)
11	(Georgia (country)) Shota Arveladze	24	41	0.59	1994–2007	Dinamo Tbilisi (1/2), Trabzonspor (2/2), Ajax (10/13), Rangers (2/7), AZ (9/17)
11	(Israel) Mu'nas Dabbur	24	49	0.49	2011–	Maccabi Tel Aviv (1/8), Red Bull Salzburg (14/28), Sevilla (3/6), TSG Hoffenheim (6/7)
11	(France) Kevin Gameiro	24	54	0.44	2005–	Strasbourg (2/3), Paris Saint-Germain (0/5), Sevilla (17/33), Atlético Madrid (2/5), Valencia (3/8)
14	(Germany) Jupp Heynckes	23	21	1.1	1971–1975	Borussia Mönchengladbach
14	(Brazil) Vágner Love	23	36	0.64	2004–2018	CSKA Moscow (20/31), Beşiktaş (3/5)
14	(Greece) Dimitris Salpingidis	23	67	0.34	1999–2015	PAOK (13/43), Panathinaikos (10/24)
17	(England) Martin Chivers	22	34	0.65	1971–1978	Tottenham Hotspur
17	(Germany) Jürgen Klinsmann	22	36	0.61	1988–1998	VfB Stuttgart (4/8), Inter Milan (3/13), Bayern Munich (15/14), Sampdoria (0/1)
17	(Netherlands) Dennis Bergkamp	22	42	0.52	1988–2000	Ajax (9/21), Inter Milan (9/13), Arsenal (4/8)
17	(Germany) Karl-Heinz Rummenigge	22	49	0.45	1977–1989	Bayern Munich (13/22), Inter Milan (9/23), Servette (0/4)

== All-time appearances ==
=== Including qualifying rounds ===
As of 20 February 2025

Rank	Nation	Player	Apps	Debut in Europe	Club(s)
1	Italy	Giuseppe Bergomi	96	1980	Inter Milan
2	Germany	Frank Rost	90	1995	Werder Bremen; Schalke 04; Hamburger SV
3	Portugal	Rui Patrício	88	2008	Sporting CP; Wolverhampton Wanderers; Roma
4	Israel	**Bibras Natcho**	87	2006	Rubin Kazan; Hapoel Tel Aviv; CSKA Moscow; Olympiacos; **Partizan**
5	Belgium	**Dries Mertens**	82	2010	Utrecht; PSV Eindhoven; Napoli; **Galatasaray**
5	Spain	Pepe Reina	82	2000	Barcelona; Villarreal; Liverpool; Napoli; Milan
7	Austria	**Aleksandar Dragović**	81	2008	**Austria Wien**; Basel; Dynamo Kyiv; Bayer Leverkusen; Red Star Belgrade
8	Portugal	**João Moutinho**	80	2005	Sporting CP; Porto; Monaco; Wolverhampton Wanderers; **Braga**
9	Portugal	João Pereira	77	2003	Benfica; Braga; Sporting CP; Valencia; Trabzonspor
10	Greece	Dimitris Salpingidis	76	1999	PAOK; Panathinaikos
11	Netherlands	Jeremain Lens	75	2006	AZ; PSV Eindhoven; Dynamo Kyiv; Fenerbahçe; Beşiktaş
12	Spain	Raúl García	74	2005	Osasuna; Atlético Madrid; Athletic Bilbao
13	Portugal	Daniel Carriço	73	2008	Sporting CP; Sevilla
13	Turkey	Mehmet Topal	73	2007	Galatasaray; Valencia; Fenerbahçe; İstanbul Başakşehir
15	Croatia	Mladen Petrić	72	2004	Grasshopper; Basel; Hamburger SV; Panathinaikos
16	Austria	Andreas Ulmer	71	2006	Austria Wien; Red Bull Salzburg
17	Canada	Atiba Hutchinson	70	2007	Copenhagen; PSV Eindhoven; Beşiktaş
17	Slovakia	Martin Škrtel	70	2004	Zenit Saint Petersburg; Liverpool; Fenerbahçe; İstanbul Başakşehir
19	Austria	Mario Sonnleitner	69	2005	GAK; Sturm Graz; Rapid Wien
19	Italy	Walter Zenga	69	1983	Inter Milan; Sampdoria

**Bold**	=	Still active

=== Excluding qualifying rounds ===
As of 20 February 2025

Rank	Nation	Player	Apps	Debut in Europe	Club(s)
1	Italy	Giuseppe Bergomi	96	1980	Inter Milan
2	Germany	Frank Rost	87	1995	Werder Bremen; Schalke 04; Hamburger SV
3	Spain	Pepe Reina	77	2000	Barcelona; Villarreal; Liverpool; Napoli; Milan
4	Portugal	Rui Patrício	75	2008	Sporting CP; Wolverhampton Wanderers; Roma
5	Belgium	**Dries Mertens**	73	2010	Utrecht; PSV Eindhoven; Napoli; **Galatasaray**
6	Portugal	**João Moutinho**	69	2005	Sporting CP; Porto; Monaco; Wolverhampton Wanderers; **Braga**
6	Italy	Walter Zenga	69	1983	Inter Milan; Sampdoria
8	Spain	Raúl García	67	2005	Osasuna; Atlético Madrid; Athletic Bilbao
8	Greece	Dimitris Salpingidis	67	1999	PAOK; Panathinaikos
10	Austria	**Aleksandar Dragović**	66	2008	**Austria Wien**; Basel; Dynamo Kyiv; Bayer Leverkusen; Red Star Belgrade

**Bold**	=	Still active

== Scorelines ==
- Highest win in one leg, most goals in game:
  - 1984–85, First round:
    - Ajax 14–0 Red Boys Differdange
- Highest aggregate win, most goals in tie:
  - 1972–73, First round:
    - Feyenoord 9–0 Rumelange
    - Rumelange 0–12 Feyenoord
    - Feyenoord won 21–0 on aggregate
- Best second-leg comebacks: (4 goals)
  - 1984–85, Second round:
    - Queens Park Rangers 6–2 Partizan
    - Partizan 4–0 Queens Park Rangers
    - 6–6 on aggregate, Partizan won on away goals
  - 1985–86, Third round:
    - Borussia Mönchengladbach 5–1 Real Madrid
    - Real Madrid 4–0 Borussia Mönchengladbach
    - 5–5 on aggregate, Real Madrid won on away goals
  - 2018–19, Third qualifying round:
    - Dinamo Minsk 4–0 Zenit Saint Petersburg
    - Zenit Saint Petersburg 8–1 Dinamo Minsk (a.e.t.) (4–0 after 90 minutes)
    - Zenit Saint Petersburg won 8–5 on aggregate
- Best away-leg come-back after losing home leg: (3 goals)
  - 2009–10, play-off round:
    - Dinamo București 0–3 Slovan Liberec
    - Slovan Liberec 0–3 Dinamo București (a.e.t.)
    - Dinamo București won 9–8 on penalties
- Final comeback:
  - 1988:
    - Espanyol 3–0 Bayer Leverkusen
    - Bayer Leverkusen 3–0 Espanyol (a.e.t.)
    - 3–3 on aggregate, Bayer Leverkusen won 3–2 on penalties
- Highest aggregate score in the final:
  - 1993:
    - Borussia Dortmund 1–3 Juventus
    - Juventus 3–0 Borussia Dortmund
    - Juventus won 6–1 on aggregate

== Bibliography ==
- UEFA (2023). "1. Facts & figures" (PDF). UEFA Europa League Statistics Handbook 2022/23. Archived from the original (PDF) on September 21, 2023.
- UEFA (2023b). "2. Finals" (PDF). UEFA Europa League Statistics Handbook 2022/23. Archived from the original (PDF) on June 17, 2023.
- UEFA (2023c). "3. All-time records 1971–2023" (PDF). UEFA Europa League Statistics Handbook 2022/23. Archived from the original (PDF) on September 21, 2023.

== See also ==
- European Cup and UEFA Champions League records and statistics
- European association football club records and statistics
- UEFA Cup Winners' Cup records and statistics
- UEFA club competition records and statistics
- List of world association football records
- UEFA Super Cup
