= Anselmo Fernandez =

Portuguese architect and football manager

Personal information
- Full name: Anselmo Fernandez Rodrigues
- Date of birth: 21 August 1918
- Place of birth: Lisbon, Portugal
- Date of death: 19 January 2000 (aged 81)
- Place of death: Madrid, Spain

Managerial career
- Years: Team
- 1964: Sporting CP
- 1965: Sporting CP
- 1965–1968: CUF Barreiro
Citizenship	Portuguese
Occupation	Architect
Buildings	Estádio José Alvalade; Hotel Tivoli; Biblioteca Nacional de Portugal; Reitoria da Universidade, Lisbon; Faculdade de Letras, Lisbon; Faculdade de Direito, Lisbon; Hotel Florida, Lisbon

Anselmo Fernandez Rodrigues (21 August 1918 – 19 January 2000) was a Portuguese architect and football manager who led Sporting Clube de Portugal (Sporting CP) to victory in the UEFA Cup Winners' Cup in 1964 and was the architect of Sporting CP's Estádio José Alvalade inaugurated in 1956.

== Early life and career ==
Anselmo Fernandez, born in Lisbon of Spanish descent, initially hoped for a career as football player with Lisbon's Sporting Clube de Portugal, however his health did not allow for it. He later engaged with Rugby at the club and emerged as a well regarded referee in that sport. His career focus then switched to architecture. His first major work was the original Estádio José Alvalade, which he built in conjunction with António Augusto Sá da Costa. The 61,000 capacity stadium of SCP opened in 1956. He was a major collaborator in many works of the architects Porfírio Pardal Monteiro and António Pardal Monteiro being involved with construction of the Lisbon hotel Tivoli, National Library of Portugal, the directorate of Lisbon University and the Faculty of Law. The Reitoria da Universidade, the university directorate was awarded with a Prémio Valmor, a major architectural prize. In 1962 he had a first brief stint as coach of Sporting's football team. His second stint at the helm of Sporting ended spectacularly. In the quarterfinals of the European Cup Winner' Cup in March 1964 Sporting defeated Manchester United – featuring Bobby Charlton, George Best and Denis Law – 5-0 after an initial away defeat of 1-4, which was instrumental in the ousting of his predecessor, the Brazilian Gentil Cardoso. After a tight contest in the semifinals against Olympique Lyonnais Sporting met MTK Budapest in the final. The match in Brussel's Heysel Stadium ended 3-3. The rematch in Antwerp was decided by a directly converted corner kick by João Morais, who was replacing injured star defender Hilário Conceição, thus Sporting gained its hitherto only international trophy. After this, Fernandez withdrew and made way for Frenchman Jean Luciano. Another crisis at the club made Fernandez step up once more for several weeks. He began the next season at the helm of the club. Fernandez, who up to then has offered all his services to Sporting for free, including his work for the stadium, was offered a remuneration of 15 million Escudos, which he considered low. Further dissonances led to an early separation. The Brazilian Otto Glória succeeded him and achieved the championship by the end of the year. Fernandez continued coaching at the then first division club CUF Barreiro, which achieved mid-table positions between 1965/66 and 1967/68. In his third season with CUF he got severely injured in a road accident requiring neurosurgery. This led to his retirement. In further years Sporting Clube de Portugal would bestow all its honours – the Prémio Stomp and honorary membership – to Anselmo Fernandez. Os Cinquentenários, an organisation closely linked to the club, anointed him Visconde de Alvalade, the "Viscount of Alvalade", in reference to Alfredo Holtreman, Viscount of Alvalade, the first president of Sporting CP, from 1906 to 1910, the sports club founded in 1906 by his grandson José Alvalade through the Viscount's donation of money and land.

== Architectural works ==
- Estádio José Alvalade, Lisbon, 1956 (with António Augusto Sá da Costa)
- Hotel Tivoli, Lisbon, 1956 (with Porfírio Pardal Monteiro and António Pardal Monteiro)
- National Library of Portugal (with Porfírio Pardal Monteiro and António Pardal Monteiro)
- Reitoria da Universidade, Lisbon (with Porfírio Pardal Monteiro and António Pardal Monteiro). Awarded with the Prémio Valmor
- Faculdade de Letras, Lisbon (with Porfírio Pardal Monteiro and António Pardal Monteiro)
- Faculdade de Direito, Lisbon (with Porfírio Pardal Monteiro and António Pardal Monteiro)
- Hotel Florida, Lisbon (with Jorge Ferreira Chaves e Eduardo Goulartt Medeiros).
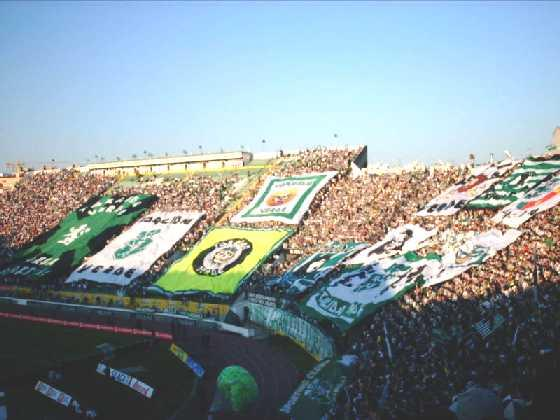
The historic Estádio José Alvalade

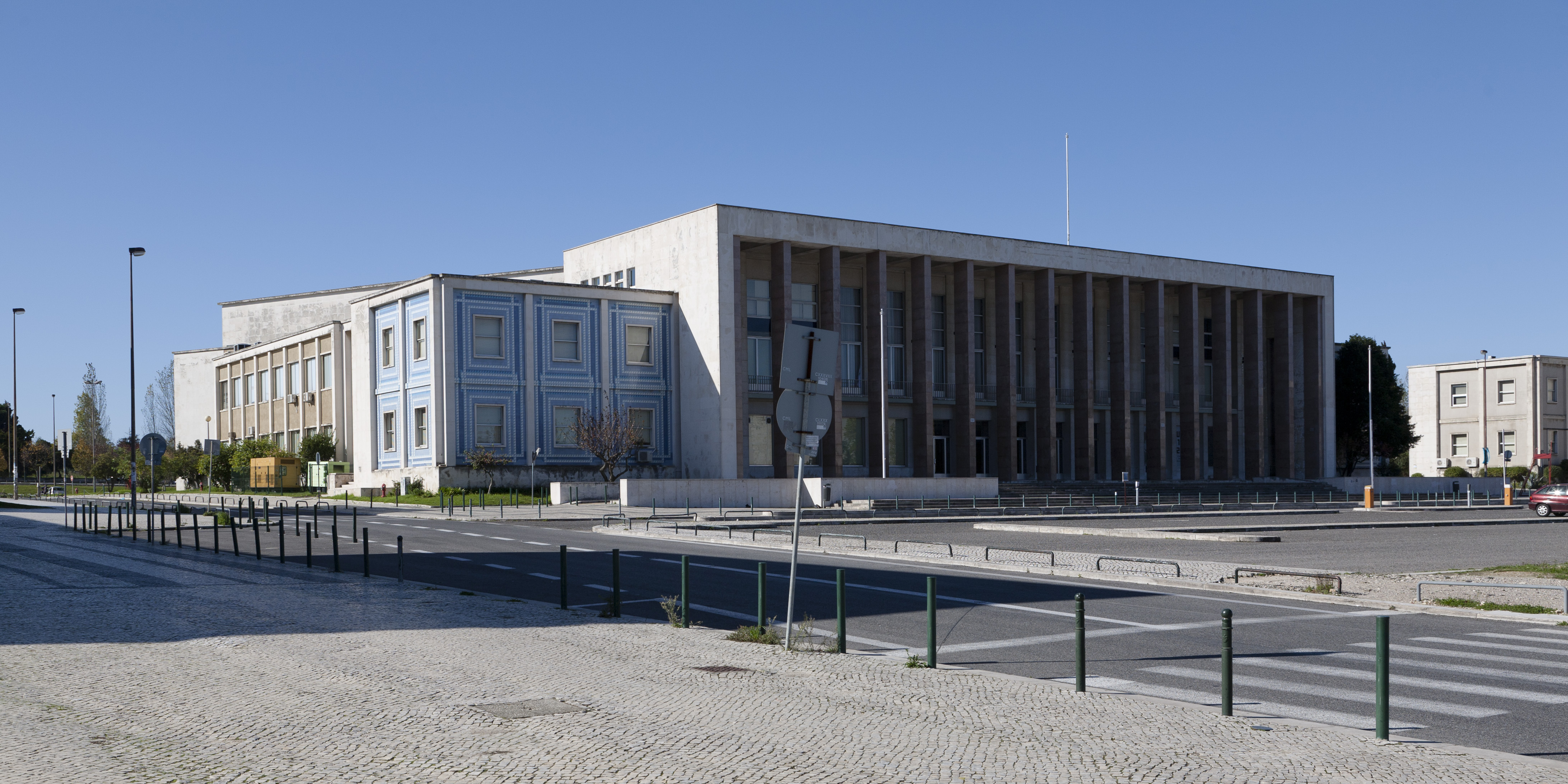
Reitoria da Universidade de Lisboa

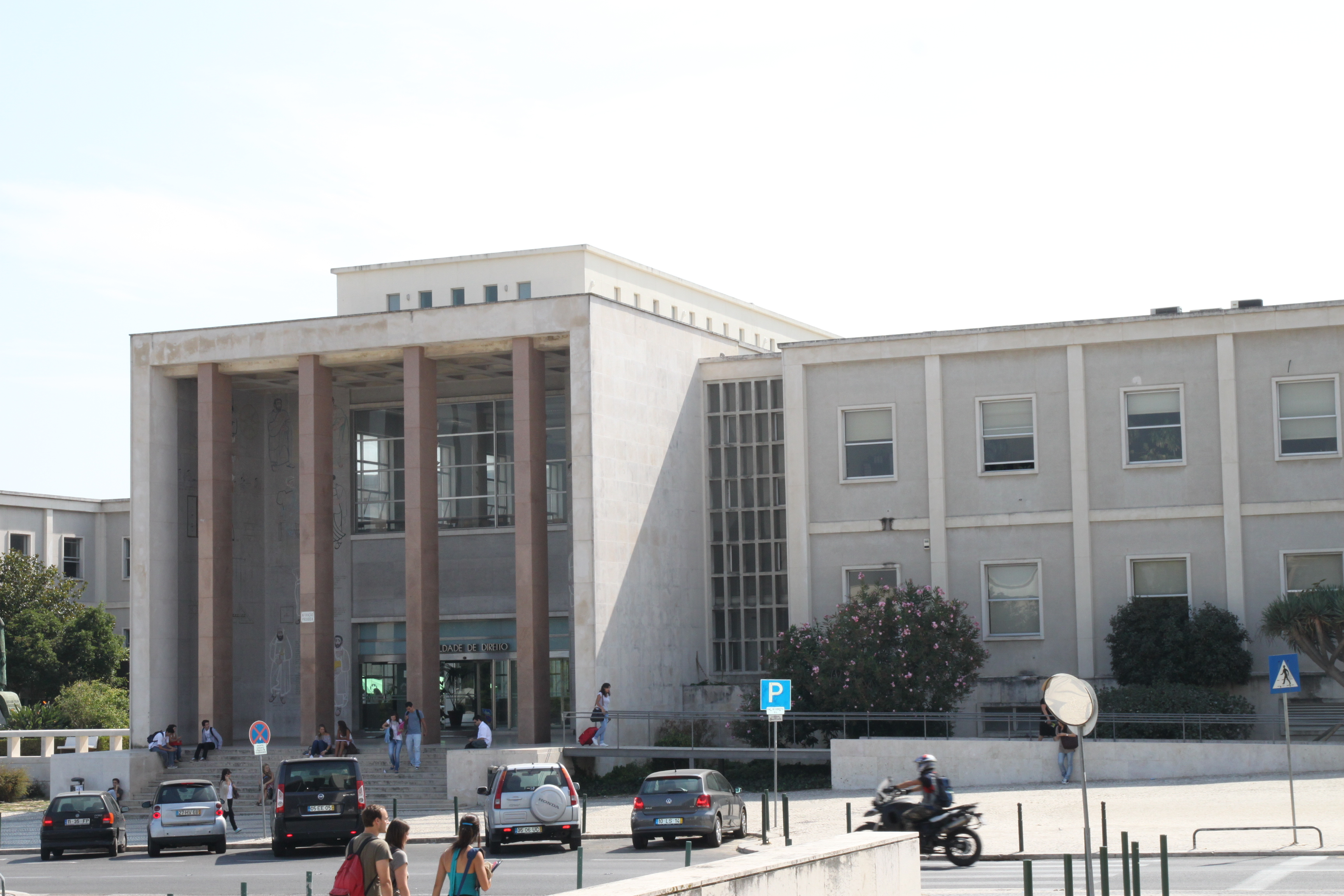
Faculdade de Direito da Universidade de Lisboa

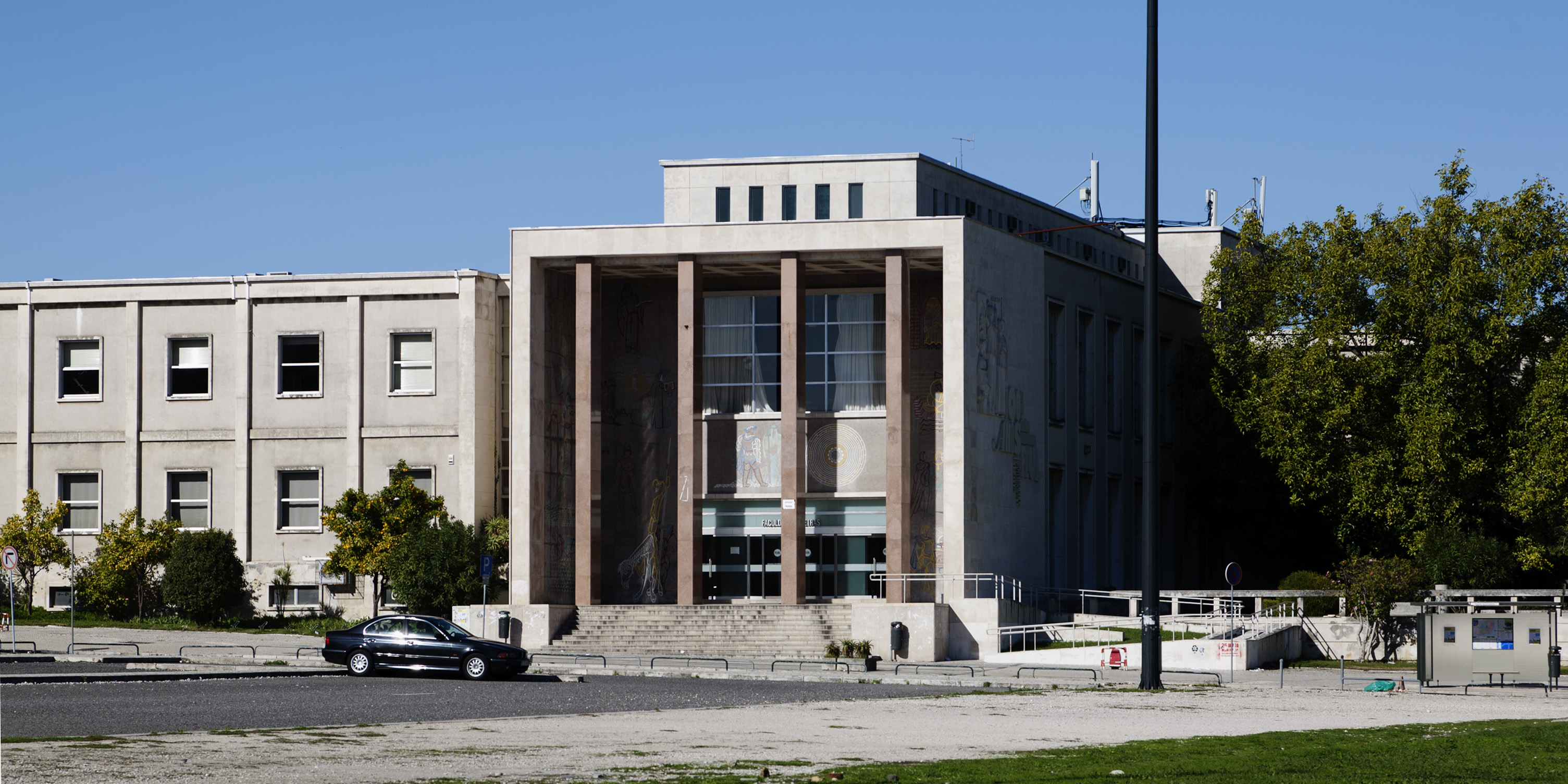
Faculdade de Letras da Universidade de Lisboa

== See also ==
- List of UEFA Cup Winners' Cup winning managers
