= List of UEFA Cup Winners' Cup finals =

European football matches

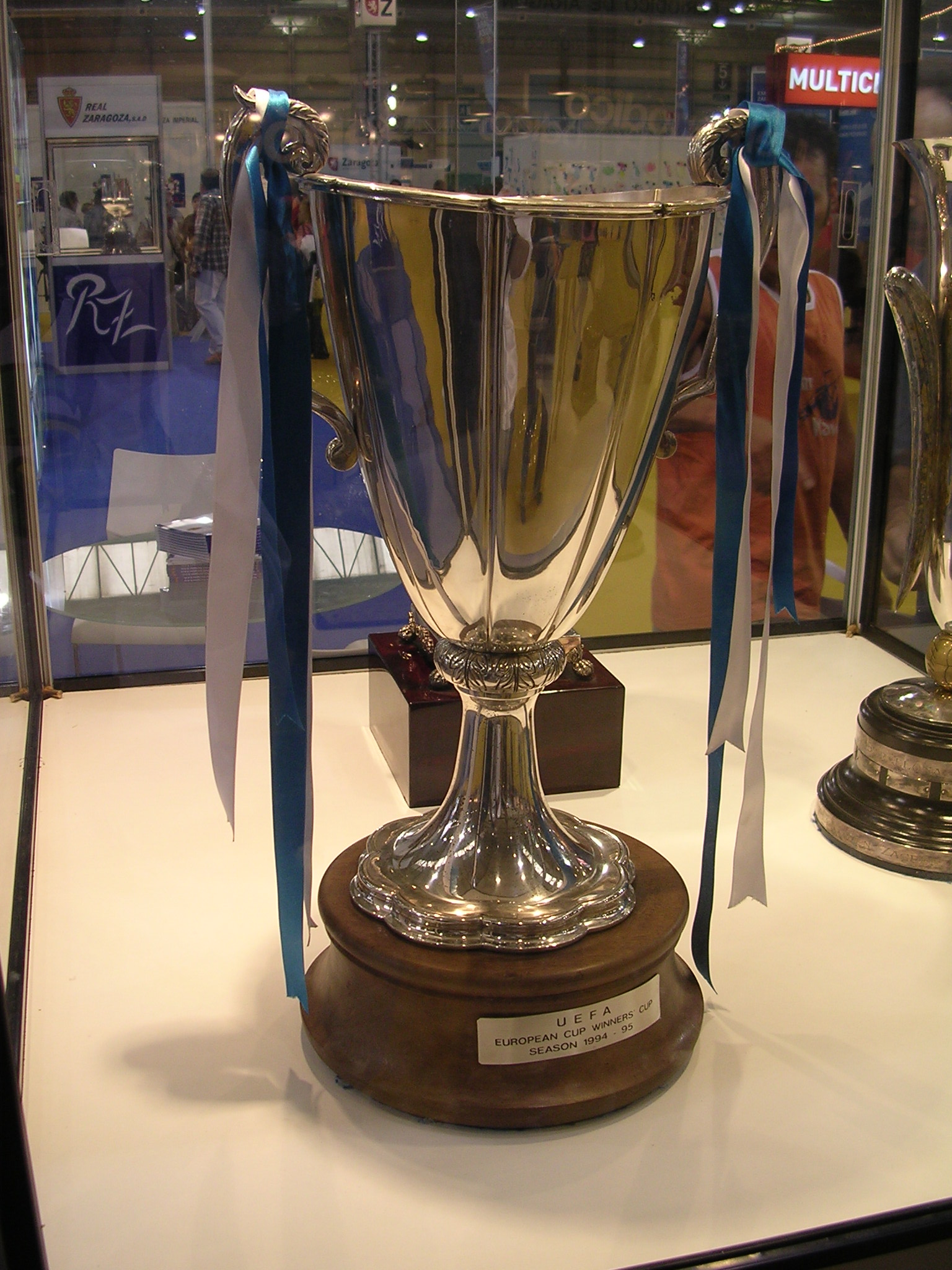
- Founded: 1960
- Abolished: 1999
- Region: Europe (UEFA)
- Teams: 32 (first round); 2 (finalists)
- Last champions: (Italy) Lazio (1st title)
- Most championships: (Spain) Barcelona (4 titles)

The UEFA Cup Winners' Cup (called European Cup Winners' Cup prior to 1994–95) was a seasonal association football competition contested between member associations of European football's governing body, the Union of European Football Associations (UEFA). It was open to winners of domestic cup competitions, such as the English FA Cup champions. Throughout its 39-year history, the UEFA Cup Winners' Cup was always a knock-out tournament with two-legged home and away ties until the single match final staged at a neutral venue, the only exception to this being the two-legged final in the competition's first year. The first competition was won by Fiorentina, from Italy, who defeated Scotland's Rangers 4–1 over two legs to win the 1961 final. The competition was abolished in 1999; Italian team Lazio were the last team to win the competition when they beat Mallorca 2–1.

Barcelona are the most successful club in the competition's history, having won it on four occasions, followed by Anderlecht (Belgium), Milan (Italy), Chelsea (England) and Dynamo Kyiv (USSR / Ukraine) with two victories each. Barcelona, Atlético Madrid, Real Madrid (all from Spain), Anderlecht (Belgium), Rangers (Scotland), Arsenal (England) and Rapid Wien (Austria) hold the record for being runners-up the most times, with each team losing the final twice. Teams from England won the competition eight times, more than any other country. Additionally, England provided nine different teams in the finals, seven of which went on to win the trophy at least once, both also records.

== List of finals ==
Key
†	Match went to extra time
*	Match won on a penalty shoot-out
&	Match won after a replay

UEFA Cup Winners' Cup finals
Season	Nation	Winners	Score	Runners-up	Nation	Venue	Attendance
1960–61 (Note: Only the final of the first season of the Cup Winners' Cup was played as a two-legged tie.)	Italy	Fiorentina	2–0	Rangers	Scotland	Ibrox Stadium, Glasgow, Scotland	80,000
1960–61	Italy	Fiorentina	2–1	Rangers	Scotland	Stadio Comunale, Florence, Italy	50,000
1961–62	Spain	Atlético Madrid	1–1	Fiorentina	Italy	Hampden Park, Glasgow, Scotland	29,066
1961–62	Spain	Atlético Madrid	3–0^{&}	Fiorentina	Italy	Neckarstadion, Stuttgart, West Germany	38,120
1962–63	England	Tottenham Hotspur	5–1	Atlético Madrid	Spain	De Kuip, Rotterdam, Netherlands	49,143
1963–64	Portugal	Sporting CP	3–3	MTK Budapest	Hungary	Heysel Stadium, Brussels, Belgium	3,208
1963–64	Portugal	Sporting CP	1–0^{&}	MTK Budapest	Hungary	Bosuil Stadium, Antwerp, Belgium	13,924
1964–65	England	West Ham United	2–0	1860 Munich	West Germany	Wembley Stadium, London, England	97,974
1965–66	West Germany	Borussia Dortmund	2–1^{†}	Liverpool	England	Hampden Park, Glasgow, Scotland	41,657
1966–67	West Germany	Bayern Munich	1–0^{†}	Rangers	Scotland	Städtisches Stadion, Nuremberg, West Germany	69,480
1967–68	Italy	Milan	2–0	Hamburger SV	West Germany	De Kuip, Rotterdam, Netherlands	53,276
1968–69	Czechoslovakia	Slovan Bratislava	3–2	Barcelona	Spain	St. Jakob Stadium, Basel, Switzerland	19,478
1969–70	England	Manchester City	2–1	Górnik Zabrze	Poland	Prater Stadium, Vienna, Austria	7,968
1970–71	England	Chelsea	1–1	Real Madrid	Spain	Karaiskakis Stadium, Piraeus, Greece	42,000
1970–71	England	Chelsea	2–1^{&}	Real Madrid	Spain	Karaiskakis Stadium, Piraeus, Greece	19,917
1971–72	Scotland	Rangers	3–2	Dynamo Moscow	Soviet Union	Camp Nou, Barcelona, Spain	24,701
1972–73	Italy	Milan	1–0	Leeds United	England	Kaftanzoglio Stadium, Thessaloniki, Greece	40,154
1973–74	East Germany	1. FC Magdeburg	2–0	Milan	Italy	De Kuip, Rotterdam, Netherlands	6,461
1974–75	Soviet Union	Dynamo Kyiv	3–0	Ferencváros	Hungary	St. Jakob Stadium, Basel, Switzerland	10,897
1975–76	Belgium	Anderlecht	4–2	West Ham United	England	Heysel Stadium, Brussels, Belgium	58,000
1976–77	West Germany	Hamburger SV	2–0	Anderlecht	Belgium	Olympisch Stadion, Amsterdam, Netherlands	66,000
1977–78	Belgium	Anderlecht	4–0	Austria Wien	Austria	Parc des Princes, Paris, France	48,769
1978–79	Spain	Barcelona	4–3^{†}	Fortuna Düsseldorf	West Germany	St. Jakob Stadium, Basel, Switzerland	58,000
1979–80	Spain	Valencia	0–0* (Note: Score was 0–0 after 90 minutes and extra time. Valencia won the penalty-shootout 5–4.)	Arsenal	England	Heysel Stadium, Brussels, Belgium	40,000
1980–81	Soviet Union	Dinamo Tbilisi	2–1	Carl Zeiss Jena	East Germany	Rheinstadion, Düsseldorf, West Germany	8,000
1981–82	Spain	Barcelona	2–1	Standard Liège	Belgium	Camp Nou, Barcelona, Spain	100,000
1982–83	Scotland	Aberdeen	2–1^{†}	Real Madrid	Spain	Nya Ullevi, Gothenburg, Sweden	17,804
1983–84	Italy	Juventus	2–1	Porto	Portugal	St. Jakob Stadium, Basel, Switzerland	60,000
1984–85	England	Everton	3–1	Rapid Wien	Austria	De Kuip, Rotterdam, Netherlands	38,500
1985–86	Soviet Union	Dynamo Kyiv	3–0	Atlético Madrid	Spain	Stade de Gerland, Lyon, France	39,300
1986–87	Netherlands	Ajax	1–0	1. FC Lokomotive Leipzig	East Germany	Spyros Louis Stadium, Athens, Greece	35,000
1987–88	Belgium	KV Mechelen	1–0	Ajax	Netherlands	Stade de la Meinau, Strasbourg, France	39,446
1988–89	Spain	Barcelona	2–0	Sampdoria	Italy	Wankdorf Stadium, Bern, Switzerland	45,000
1989–90	Italy	Sampdoria	2–0^{†}	Anderlecht	Belgium	Nya Ullevi, Gothenburg, Sweden	20,103
1990–91	England	Manchester United	2–1	Barcelona	Spain	De Kuip, Rotterdam, Netherlands	45,000
1991–92	Germany	Werder Bremen	2–0	Monaco	France	Estádio da Luz, Lisbon, Portugal	16,000
1992–93	Italy	Parma	3–1	Antwerp	Belgium	Wembley Stadium, London, England	37,393
1993–94	England	Arsenal	1–0	Parma	Italy	Parken Stadium, Copenhagen, Denmark	33,765
1994–95	Spain	Zaragoza	2–1^{†}	Arsenal	England	Parc des Princes, Paris, France	42,424
1995–96	France	Paris Saint-Germain	1–0	Rapid Wien	Austria	King Baudouin Stadium, Brussels, Belgium	37,500
1996–97	Spain	Barcelona	1–0	Paris Saint-Germain	France	De Kuip, Rotterdam, Netherlands	36,802
1997–98	England	Chelsea	1–0	VfB Stuttgart	Germany	Råsunda Stadium, Stockholm, Sweden	30,216
1998–99	Italy	Lazio	2–1	Mallorca	Spain	Villa Park, Birmingham, England	33,000

== Performances ==
=== By club ===
Performance in the UEFA Cup Winners' Cup by club
Club	Titles	Runners-up	Years won	Years runner-up
(Spain) Barcelona	4	2	1979, 1982, 1989, 1997	1969, 1991
(Belgium) Anderlecht	2	2	1976, 1978	1977, 1990
(Italy) Milan	2	1	1968, 1973	1974
(England) Chelsea	2	0	1971, 1998	—
(Soviet Union) Dynamo Kyiv	2	0	1975, 1986	—
(Spain) Atlético Madrid	1	2	1962	1963, 1986
(Scotland) Rangers	1	2	1972	1961, 1967
(England) Arsenal	1	2	1994	1980, 1995
(Italy) Fiorentina	1	1	1961	1962
(England) West Ham United	1	1	1965	1976
(Germany) Hamburger SV	1	1	1977	1968
(Netherlands) Ajax	1	1	1987	1988
(Italy) Sampdoria	1	1	1990	1989
(Italy) Parma	1	1	1993	1994
(France) Paris Saint-Germain	1	1	1996	1997
(England) Tottenham Hotspur	1	0	1963	—
(Portugal) Sporting CP	1	0	1964	—
(Germany) Borussia Dortmund	1	0	1966	—
(Germany) Bayern Munich	1	0	1967	—
(Czechoslovakia) Slovan Bratislava	1	0	1969	—
(England) Manchester City	1	0	1970	—
(East Germany) 1. FC Magdeburg	1	0	1974	—
(Spain) Valencia	1	0	1980	—
(Soviet Union) Dinamo Tbilisi	1	0	1981	—
(Scotland) Aberdeen	1	0	1983	—
(Italy) Juventus	1	0	1984	—
(England) Everton	1	0	1985	—
(Belgium) KV Mechelen	1	0	1988	—
(England) Manchester United	1	0	1991	—
(Germany) Werder Bremen	1	0	1992	—
(Spain) Zaragoza	1	0	1995	—
(Italy) Lazio	1	0	1999	—
(Spain) Real Madrid	0	2	—	1971, 1983
(Austria) Rapid Wien	0	2	—	1985, 1996
(Hungary) MTK Budapest	0	1	—	1964
(Germany) 1860 Munich	0	1	—	1965
(England) Liverpool	0	1	—	1966
(Poland) Górnik Zabrze	0	1	—	1970
(Soviet Union) Dynamo Moscow	0	1	—	1972
(England) Leeds United	0	1	—	1973
(Hungary) Ferencváros	0	1	—	1975
Austria Wien	0	1	—	1978
(Germany) Fortuna Düsseldorf	0	1	—	1979
(East Germany) Carl Zeiss Jena	0	1	—	1981
(Belgium) Standard Liège	0	1	—	1982
(Portugal) Porto	0	1	—	1984
(East Germany) 1. FC Lokomotive Leipzig	0	1	—	1987
(France) Monaco	0	1	—	1992
(Belgium) Antwerp	0	1	—	1993
(Germany) VfB Stuttgart	0	1	—	1998
(Spain) Mallorca	0	1	—	1999

=== By nation ===
Performance in finals by nation
Nation	Titles	Runners-up	Total
England	8	5	13
Spain	7	7	14
Italy	7	4	11
Germany (Note: Includes clubs representing West Germany.)	4	4	8
Belgium	3	4	7
Soviet Union (Note: Two Soviet final appearances were by a Ukrainian SSR club (both won), one was by a Georgian SSR club (won) and one was by a Russian SFSR club (lost).)	3	1	4
Scotland	2	2	4
France	1	2	3
East Germany	1	2	3
Netherlands	1	1	2
Portugal	1	1	2
Czechoslovakia (Note: The Czechoslovak final appearance was by a Slovak SR club.)	1	0	1
Austria	0	3	3
Hungary	0	2	2
Poland	0	1	1

== See also ==
- List of European Cup and UEFA Champions League finals
- List of UEFA Cup Winners' Cup winning managers
- List of UEFA Cup and Europa League finals
- List of UEFA Conference League finals
- List of UEFA Super Cup matches
