= List of UEFA Cup Winners' Cup winning managers =

The UEFA Cup Winners' Cup (called European Cup Winners' Cup prior to 1994–95) was an association football competition contested between UEFA member associations' domestic cup winners, such as the English FA Cup champions. Hungarian manager Nándor Hidegkuti led Italian club Fiorentina to victory against Rangers in the inaugural tournament in 1961, which was recognized as an official UEFA competition the following season due to insistence of Italian Football Federation president Artemio Franchi. As part of UEFA's reorganisation of their cup competitions, the Cup Winners' Cup was abolished and the last final of the competition was held in 1999; Swede Sven-Göran Eriksson's Italian team Lazio triumphed over Spanish opponents, Mallorca.

Four managers have twice led their teams to victory in the tournament, Johan Cruyff, Valeri Lobanovsky, Nereo Rocco and most recently Alex Ferguson, who won the cup in 1983 with Aberdeen of Scotland and subsequently with Manchester United of England in 1991. Italians Giovanni Trapattoni, Nevio Scala and Gianluca Vialli are the only managers that also won the Cup Winners' Cup as players.

== List ==
=== By year ===
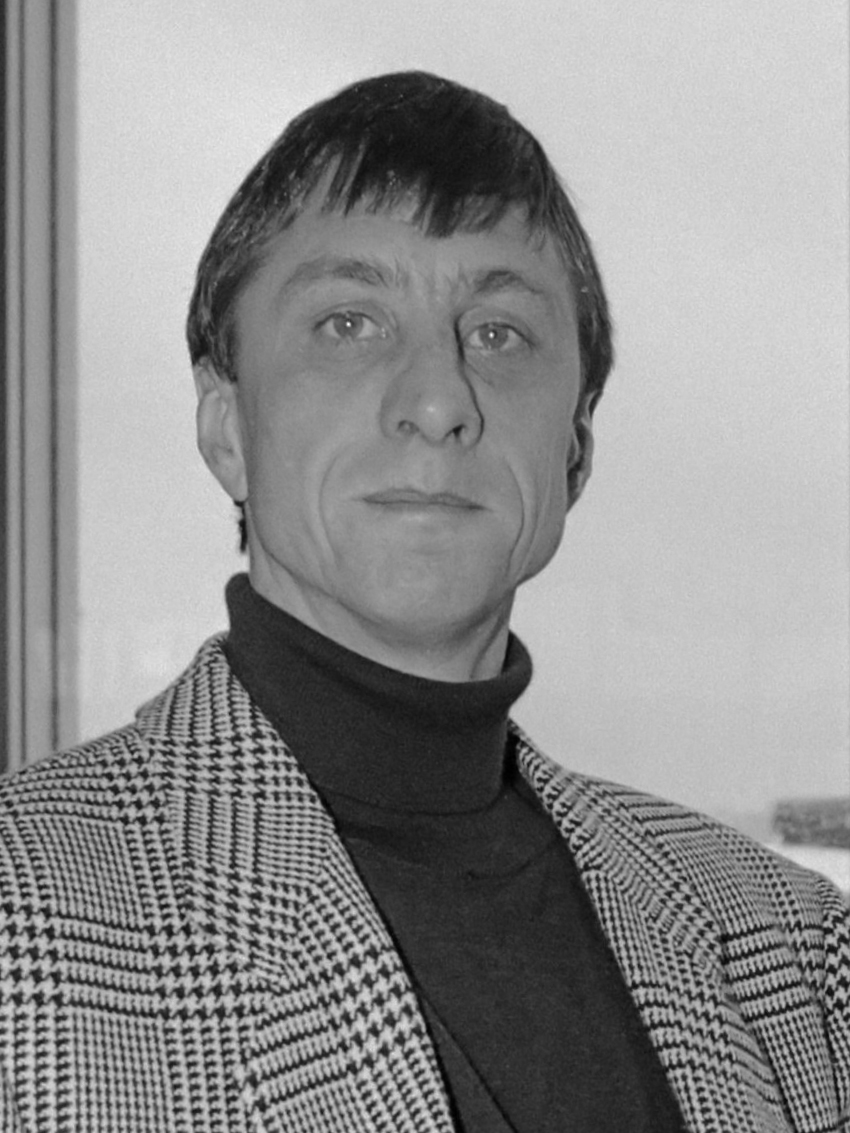
Johan Cruyff won the trophy in 1987 and 1989. He lost the final in 1991.

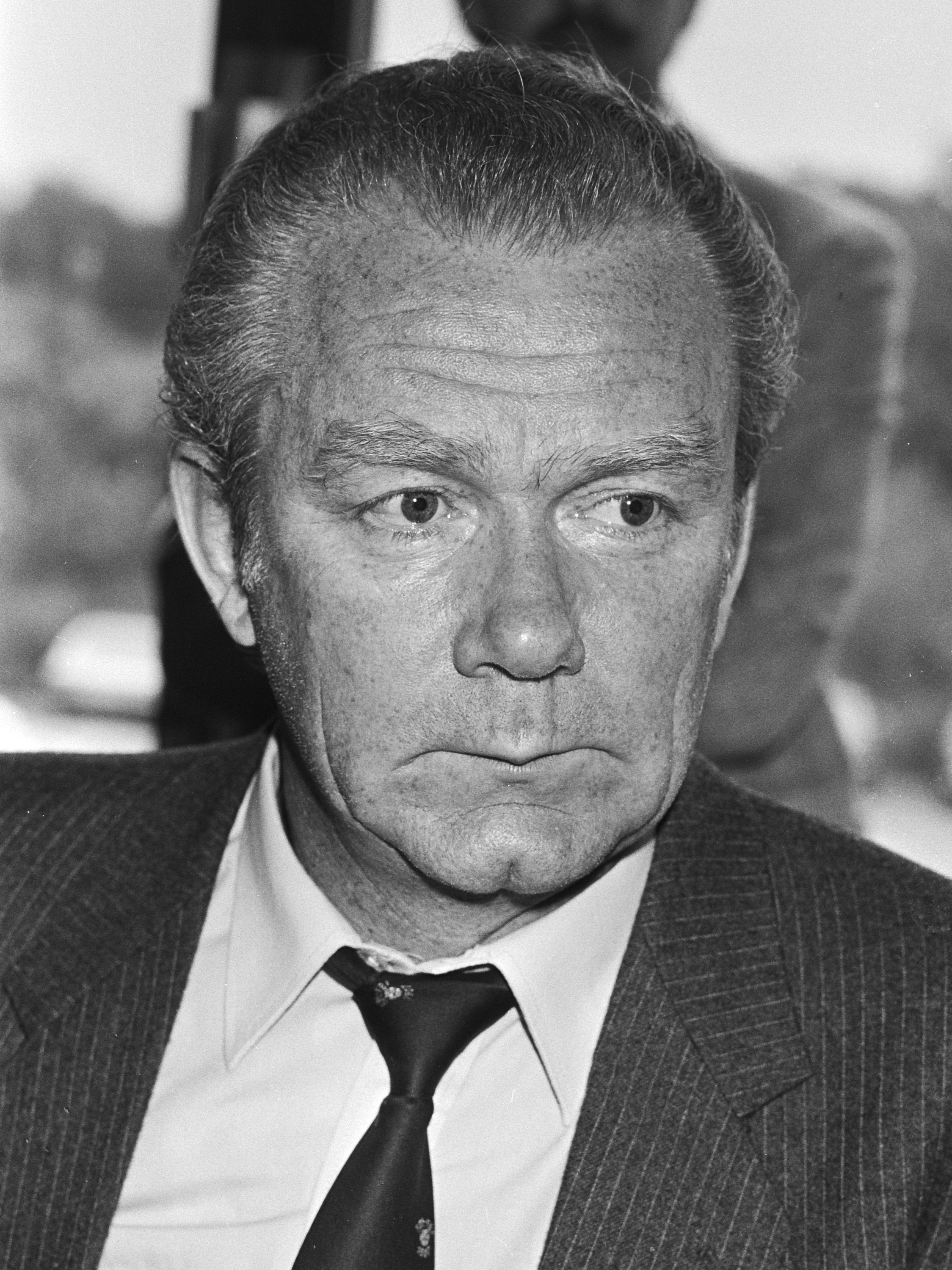
Valeri Lobanovsky won the trophy in 1975 and 1986.

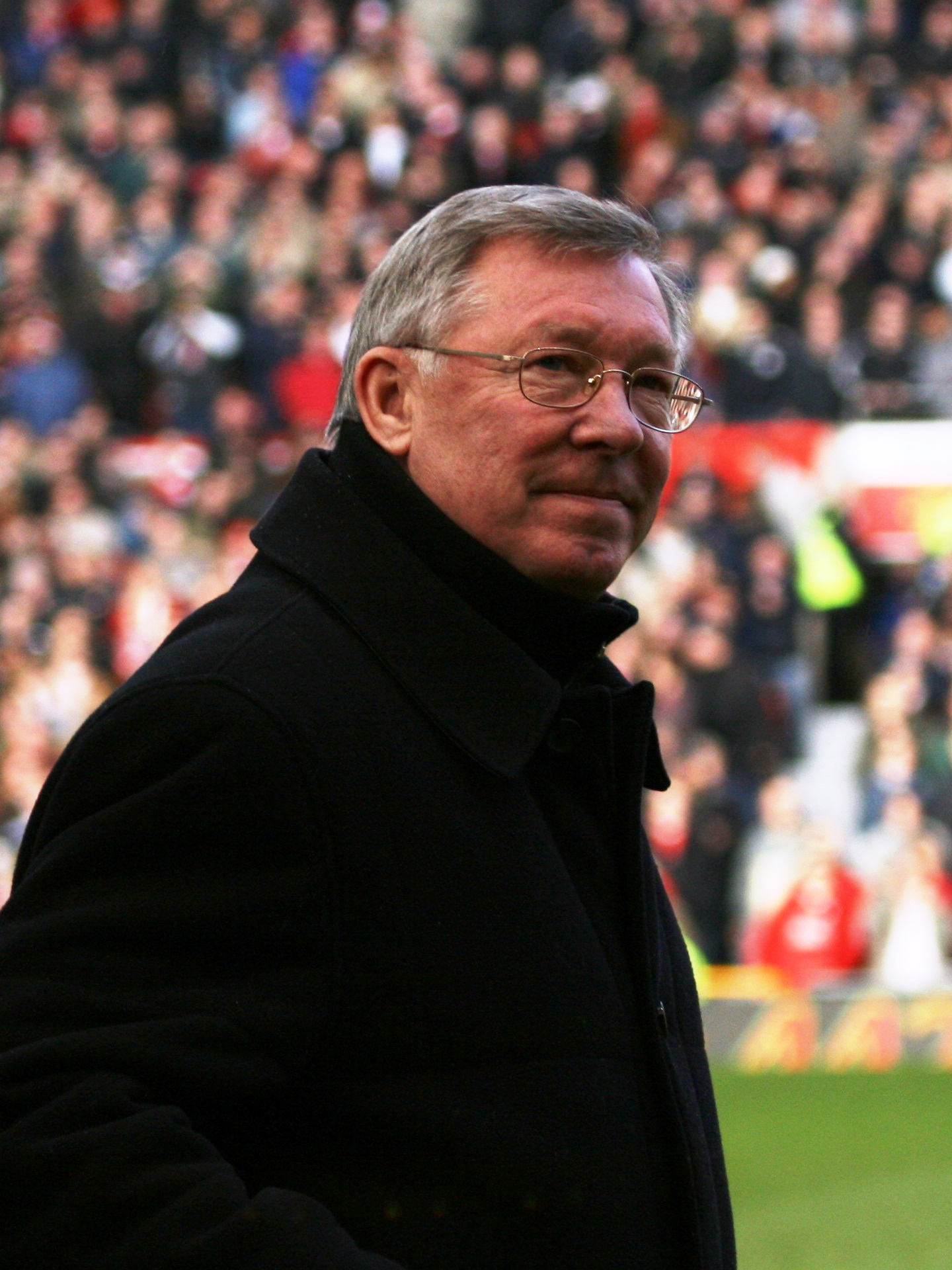
Alex Ferguson won the cup in both 1983 and 1991.

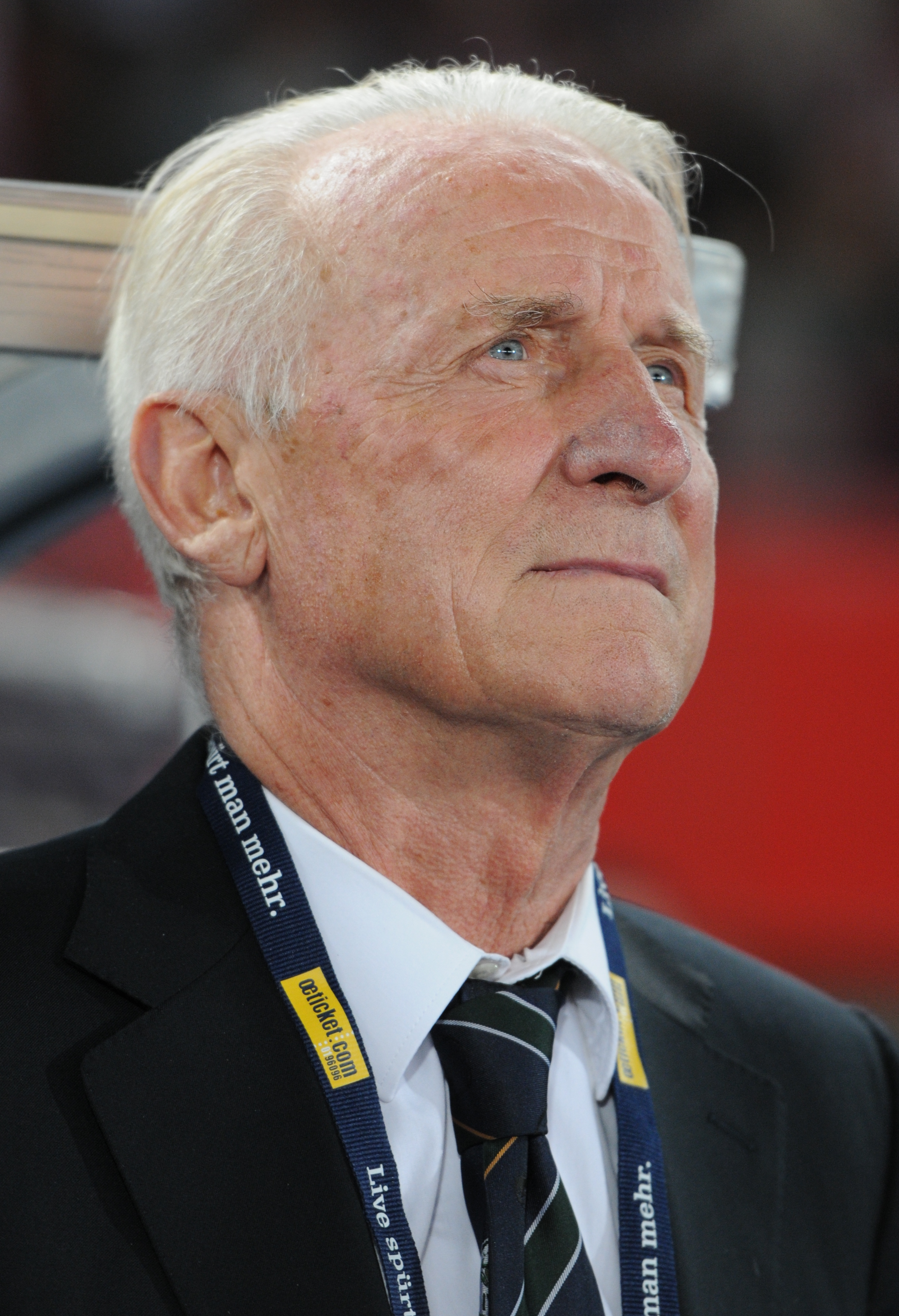
Giovanni Trapattoni won the cup in 1984.

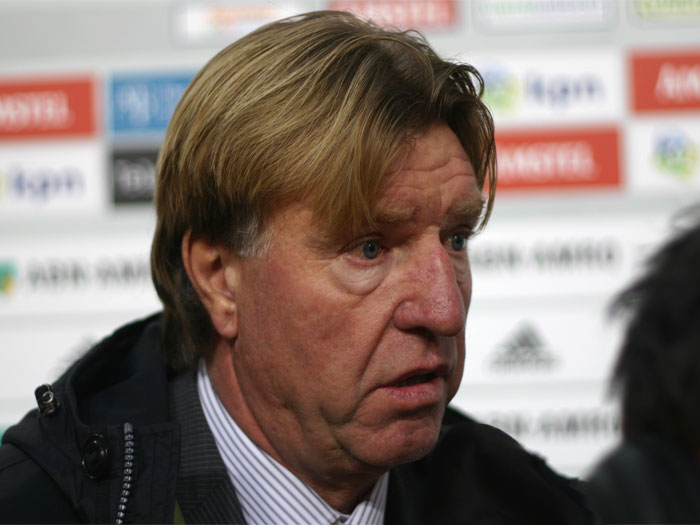
Aad de Mos won the cup in 1988.

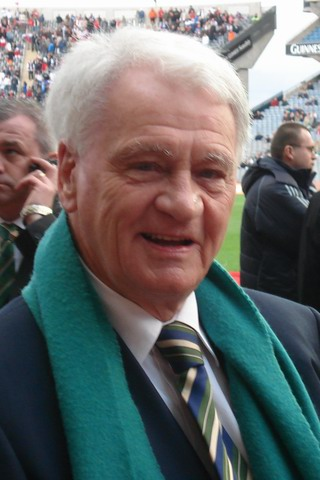
Bobby Robson won the cup in 1997.

UEFA Cup Winners' Cup winning managers
Final	Nationality	Winning manager	Nation	Club	Ref.
1961	Hungary	Nándor Hidegkuti	Italy	Fiorentina	
1962	Spain	José Villalonga	Spain	Atlético Madrid	
1963	England	Bill Nicholson	England	Tottenham Hotspur	
1964	Portugal	Anselmo Fernandez	Portugal	Sporting CP	
1965	England	Ron Greenwood	England	West Ham United	
1966	West Germany	Willi Multhaup	West Germany	Borussia Dortmund	
1967	Yugoslavia	Zlatko Čajkovski	West Germany	Bayern Munich	
1968	Italy	Nereo Rocco	Italy	Milan	
1969	Czechoslovakia	Michal Vičan	Czechoslovakia	Slovan Bratislava	
1970	England	Joe Mercer	England	Manchester City	
1971	England	Dave Sexton	England	Chelsea	
1972	Scotland	William Waddell	Scotland	Rangers	
1973	Italy	Nereo Rocco	Italy	Milan	
1974	East Germany	Heinz Krügel	East Germany	1. FC Magdeburg	
1975	Soviet Union	Valeri Lobanovsky	Soviet Union	Dynamo Kyiv	
1976	Netherlands	Hans Croon	Belgium	Anderlecht	
1977	West Germany	Kuno Klötzer	West Germany	Hamburger SV	
1978	Belgium	Raymond Goethals	Belgium	Anderlecht	
1979	Spain	Joaquim Rifé	Spain	Barcelona	
1980	Spain	Alfredo Di Stéfano	Spain	Valencia	
1981	Soviet Union	Nodar Akhalkatsi	Soviet Union	Dinamo Tbilisi	
1982	West Germany	Udo Lattek	Spain	Barcelona	
1983	Scotland	Alex Ferguson	Scotland	Aberdeen	
1984	Italy	Giovanni Trapattoni	Italy	Juventus	
1985	England	Howard Kendall	England	Everton	
1986	Soviet Union	Valeri Lobanovsky	Soviet Union	Dynamo Kyiv	
1987	Netherlands	Johan Cruyff	Netherlands	Ajax	
1988	Netherlands	Aad de Mos	Belgium	KV Mechelen	
1989	Netherlands	Johan Cruyff	Spain	Barcelona	
1990	Yugoslavia	Vujadin Boškov	Italy	Sampdoria	
1991	Scotland	Alex Ferguson	England	Manchester United	
1992	Germany	Otto Rehhagel	Germany	Werder Bremen	
1993	Italy	Nevio Scala	Italy	Parma	
1994	Scotland	George Graham	England	Arsenal	
1995	Spain	Víctor Fernández	Spain	Zaragoza	
1996	France	Luis Fernández	France	Paris Saint-Germain	
1997	England	Bobby Robson	Spain	Barcelona	
1998	Italy	Gianluca Vialli	England	Chelsea	
1999	Sweden	Sven-Göran Eriksson	Italy	Lazio	

=== Managers with multiple titles ===
Managers who have won multiple UEFA Cup Winners' Cups
Rank	Nationality	Manager	Number of wins	Years won	Club(s)
1	Italy	Nereo Rocco	2	1968, 1973	Milan
1	Soviet Union	Valeri Lobanovsky	2	1975, 1986	Dynamo Kyiv
1	Netherlands	Johan Cruyff	2	1987, 1989	Ajax, Barcelona
1	Scotland	Alex Ferguson	2	1983, 1991	Aberdeen, Manchester United

=== By nationality ===
This table lists the total number of titles won by managers of each country.

UEFA Cup Winners' Cup winning managers by nationality
Nationality	Number of wins
England	6
Italy	5
Germany (Note: Includes West Germany.)	4
Netherlands	4
Scotland	4
Spain	4
Soviet Union	3
Yugoslavia	2
Belgium	1
Czechoslovakia	1
East Germany	1
France	1
Hungary	1
Portugal	1
Sweden	1

== See also ==
- UEFA Cup Winners' Cup records and statistics
- List of UEFA Cup Winners' Cup finals
