= 2005 UEFA Cup final =

- Match programme cover
- Event: 2004–05 UEFA Cup
Sporting CP	CSKA Moscow
(Portugal)	(Russia)
1	3
- Date: 18 May 2005
- Venue: Estádio José Alvalade, Lisbon
- Man of the Match: Daniel Carvalho (CSKA Moscow)
- Referee: Graham Poll (England)
- Attendance: 47,085
- Weather: Fair; 19 °C (66 °F); 54% humidity

The 2005 UEFA Cup final was the final match of the 2004–05 UEFA Cup, the 34th season of the UEFA Cup, UEFA's second-tier club football tournament. The match was contested by Sporting CP and CSKA Moscow on 18 May 2005; CSKA won the match 3–1. Sporting CP opened the scoring in the first half from full-back Rogério, before Aleksei Berezutskiy equalised in the second half. Yuri Zhirkov would give the Russian side the lead nine minutes after CSKA's equalising goal, and the Moscow outfit would close out the scoring 15 minutes from the end after a quick CSKA counterattack saw Vágner Love become the youngest player to score in a UEFA Cup final at the age of 20 years, 341 days, firing the ball past Sporting goalkeeper Ricardo to give the Russian side a first UEFA Cup trophy. It was also the first European trophy won by a Russian club, in what was the first final since Dynamo Moscow—then part of the Russian SFSR of the Soviet Union—lost the 1972 European Cup Winners' Cup final, and the first European title for a side from what was the Soviet Union since Dynamo Kyiv, now part of Ukraine, won the 1986 European Cup Winners' Cup final.

The match was played at the Estádio José Alvalade – home ground of finalists Sporting CP – in Lisbon, Portugal. Until then, it was the third European football final to be held in Portugal, after the 1967 European Cup final, which was held in another venue in the Lisbon District, the Estádio Nacional in Oeiras, and the 1992 European Cup Winners' Cup final, which was held at the old Estádio da Luz in the city.

== Venue ==
The Estádio José Alvalade was announced as the final venue on 5 February 2004, following the decision of the UEFA Executive Committee meeting in Nyon, Switzerland.

== Route to the final ==
Note: In all results below, the score of the finalist is given first (H: home; A: away).

(Portugal) Sporting CP				Round		(Russia) CSKA Moscow			
UEFA Cup						Champions League			
Opponent	Agg.	1st leg	2nd leg	Initial phase	Qualifying phase	Opponent	Agg.	1st leg	2nd leg
Bye				Second qualifying round		(Azerbaijan) Neftçi	2–0	0–0 (A)	2–0 (H)
(Austria) Rapid Wien	2–0	2–0 (H)	0–0 (A)	First round	Third qualifying round	(Scotland) Rangers	3–2	2–1 (H)	1–1 (A)
Opponent	Result			Group stage (UC, CL)		Opponent	Result		
Bye				Matchday 1		(Portugal) Porto	0–0 (A)		
(Greece) Panionios	4–1 (H)			Matchday 2		(France) Paris Saint-Germain	2–0 (H)		
(Georgia (country)) Dinamo Tbilisi	4–0 (A)			Matchday 3		(England) Chelsea	0–2 (A)		
(France) Sochaux	0–1 (H)			Matchday 4		(England) Chelsea	0–1 (H)		
(England) Newcastle United	1–1 (A)			Matchday 5		(Portugal) Porto	0–1 (H)		
N/A				Matchday 6		(France) Paris Saint-Germain	3–1 (A)		
Group D third place: Pos / Team / Pld / Pts; 1 / (England) Newcastle United / 4 / 10; 2 / (France) Sochaux / 4 / 9; 3 / (Portugal) Sporting CP / 4 / 7; 4 / (Greece) Panionios / 4 / 3; 5 / (Georgia (country)) Dinamo Tbilisi / 4 / 0; Source: RSSSF				Final standings		Group H third place: Pos / Team / Pld / Pts; 1 / (England) Chelsea / 6 / 13; 2 / (Portugal) Porto / 6 / 8; 3 / (Russia) CSKA Moscow / 6 / 7; 4 / (France) Paris Saint-Germain / 6 / 5; Source:			
Group D third place: Pos / Team / Pld / Pts; 1 / (England) Newcastle United / 4 / 10; 2 / (France) Sochaux / 4 / 9; 3 / (Portugal) Sporting CP / 4 / 7; 4 / (Greece) Panionios / 4 / 3; 5 / (Georgia (country)) Dinamo Tbilisi / 4 / 0; Source: RSSSF						UEFA Cup			
Opponent	Agg.	1st leg	2nd leg	Knockout stage		Opponent	Agg.	1st leg	2nd leg
(Netherlands) Feyenoord	4–2	2–1 (H)	2–1 (A)	Round of 32		(Portugal) Benfica	3–1	2–0 (H)	1–1 (A)
(England) Middlesbrough	4–2	3–2 (A)	1–0 (H)	Round of 16		(Serbia and Montenegro) Partizan	3–1	1–1 (A)	2–0 (H)
(England) Newcastle United	4–2	0–1 (A)	4–1 (H)	Quarter-finals		(France) Auxerre	4–2	4–0 (H)	0–2 (A)
(Netherlands) AZ	4–4 (a)	2–1 (H)	2–3 (a.e.t.) (A)	Semi-finals		(Italy) Parma	3–0	0–0 (A)	3–0 (H)

== Match ==
=== Details ===
18 May 2005
19:45 UTC+1

Sporting CP (Portugal)	1–3	(Russia) CSKA Moscow
Rogério 29'	Report	A. Berezutski 56'; Zhirkov 65'; Vágner Love 75'

Estádio José Alvalade, Lisbon
Attendance: 47,085
Referee: Graham Poll (England)

Sporting CP	CSKA Moscow

GK	76	(Portugal) Ricardo
RB	37	(Brazil) Rogério		(substituted off) 80'
CB	22	(Portugal) Beto
CB	14	(Nigeria) Joseph Enakarhire
LB	15	(Portugal) Miguel Garcia
CM	26	(Brazil) Fábio Rochemback
CM	28	(Portugal) João Moutinho		(substituted off) 88'
RW	10	(Portugal) Ricardo Sá Pinto		(substituted off) 73'
AM	8	(Portugal) Pedro Barbosa (c)	(yellow card) 14'
LW	11	(Chile) Rodrigo Tello
CF	31	(Brazil) Liédson
Substitutes:
GK	1	(Portugal) Nélson
DF	4	(Brazil) Ânderson Polga
DF	23	(Portugal) Rui Jorge
DF	27	(Portugal) Custódio
MF	45	(Portugal) Hugo Viana		(substituted on) 88'
FW	9	(Romania) Marius Niculae		(substituted on) 73'
FW	17	(Cameroon) Roudolphe Douala		(substituted on) 80'
Manager:
(Portugal) José Peseiro

GK	35	(Russia) Igor Akinfeev
CB	24	(Russia) Vasili Berezutski
CB	4	(Russia) Sergei Ignashevich (c)
CB	6	(Russia) Aleksei Berezutski
RM	15	(Nigeria) Chidi Odiah
CM	22	(Russia) Evgeni Aldonin	(substituted off) 86'
CM	25	(Bosnia and Herzegovina) Elvir Rahimić
LM	18	(Russia) Yuri Zhirkov
AM	7	(Brazil) Daniel Carvalho	(substituted off) 82'
CF	11	(Brazil) Vágner Love
CF	9	(Croatia) Ivica Olić	(substituted off) 67'
Substitutes:
GK	1	(Russia) Veniamin Mandrykin
MF	2	(Lithuania) Deividas Šemberas	(substituted on) 82'
MF	8	(Russia) Rolan Gusev	(substituted on) 86'
MF	10	(Argentina) Osmar Ferreyra
MF	19	(Latvia) Juris Laizāns
FW	17	(Serbia and Montenegro) Miloš Krasić	(substituted on) 67'
FW	40	(Russia) Aleksandr Salugin
Manager:
(Russia) Valery Gazzaev

Man of the Match:
Daniel Carvalho (CSKA Moscow)

Assistant referees:
Michael Tingey (England)
Glenn Turner (England)
Fourth official:
Steve Bennett (England)

Match rules

- 90 minutes
- 30 minutes of extra time if necessary
- Penalty shootout if scores still level
- Seven named substitutes
- Maximum of three substitutions

== See also ==
- 2005 UEFA Champions League final
- 2005 UEFA Super Cup
- PFC CSKA Moscow in European football
- Sporting CP in European football
- 2005 PFC CSKA Moscow season
- 2004–05 Sporting CP season
