= Pedro Gomes (footballer, born 1941) =

Portuguese football manager and former player

Personal information
- Full name: Manuel Pedro Gomes
- Date of birth: 16 October 1941 (age 85)
- Place of birth: Torres Novas, Portugal
- Position: Defender

Youth career
- 1957–1960: Sporting CP

Senior career*
Years	Team	Apps	(Gls)
1960–1973	Sporting CP	157	(0)

International career
1964–1970	Portugal	9	(0)

Managerial career
- 1973–1974: Oriental
- 1974–1975: Marítimo
- 1975–1976: Farense
- 1976–1978: Marítimo
- 1978–1979: Rio Ave
- 1979–1980: Académica
- 1980–1981: Leiria
- 1981: Belenenses
- 1982: Marítimo
- 1982–1983: Rio Ave
- 1983–1984: Nacional
- 1984–1985: Sporting CP (assistant)
- 1985: Sporting CP
- 1985–1986: Torreense
- 1986–1987: Tirsense
- 1987: Trofense
- 1987–1989: Vila Real
- 1989: Lusitano Évora
- 1989–1990: Olhanense
- 1990–1991: União Tomar
- 1992–1994: Benfica Castelo Branco
- 1994–1996: Oriental
- 1996–1997: Atlético
- 1998–1999: Atlético
- 2000–2001: Marco
- 2006: Torreense
- 2006–2007: Sintrense
- 2007–2008: Oriental
- 2008–2009: Torreense
- * Club domestic league appearances and goals

Manuel Pedro Gomes (born 16 October 1941 in Torres Novas, Santarém) is a Portuguese retired football defender and manager.

== Playing career ==
Gomes spent his entire career with Sporting Clube de Portugal, going on to appear in 516 matches over 13 seasons (youth, friendlies and official), eighth-best at the time of his retirement. He was a member of the team that won the UEFA Cup Winners' Cup in 1963–64.

In 1970, Gomes won the second Primeira Liga championship of his career, the first with his active participation. He retired in June 1973 at the age of 31, having earned nine caps for Portugal during six years; his debut came on 31 May 1964 in a friendly against Argentina, in Rio de Janeiro (0–2 loss).

== Coaching career ==
Gomes took up coaching immediately after retiring, a career which would last more than three decades. In the top division he was in charge of Clube Oriental de Lisboa, S.C. Farense, C.S. Marítimo, U.D. Leiria, C.F. Os Belenenses, Rio Ave F.C. and Sporting.

Precisely with his only club as a player, Gomes served his last spell in the top tier: having started the 1984–85 season as assistant to John Toshack, he took the reins of the team in the last two matches, winning one and losing another in an eventual runner-up finish behind FC Porto.

Before signing with the Lisbon side, Gomes worked as C.D. Nacional manager, being responsible for the acquisition of future Sporting legend Oceano.

== Honours ==
=== Player ===
- Primeira Liga: 1965–66, 1969–70
- Taça de Portugal: 1962–63, 1970–71, 1972–73; Runner-up 1969–70, 1971–72
- UEFA Cup Winners' Cup: 1963–64

=== Manager ===
- Segunda Liga: 1976–77, 1980–81

== See also ==
- List of one-club men
