= 2005 UEFA Super Cup =

- Match programme cover
- Event: UEFA Super Cup
Liverpool	CSKA Moscow
(England)	(Russia)
3	1
- After extra time
- Date: 26 August 2005
- Venue: Stade Louis II, Monaco
- Man of the Match: Djibril Cissé (Liverpool)
- Referee: René Temmink (Netherlands)
- Attendance: 17,042
- Weather: Clear night 25 °C (77 °F); 55% humidity

The 2005 UEFA Super Cup was an association football match between Liverpool of England and CSKA Moscow of Russia on 26 August 2005 at Stade Louis II, Monaco, the annual UEFA Super Cup contested between the winners of the UEFA Champions League and UEFA Cup. Liverpool were appearing in the Super Cup for the fifth time, having won the competition in 1977 and 2001. CSKA Moscow were appearing in the Super Cup for the first time, the first Russian team to appear in the competition.

The teams had qualified for the competition by winning the two seasonal European competitions. Liverpool won the 2004–05 UEFA Champions League, defeating Italian team A.C. Milan 3–2 in a penalty shoot-out after the match had finished 3–3. CSKA Moscow won the 2004–05 UEFA Cup, beating Portuguese team Sporting CP 3–1.

Watched by a crowd of 17,042, CSKA took the lead in the first half when Daniel Carvalho scored. Liverpool did not respond until the 82nd minute when substitute Djibril Cissé scored. The score remained 1–1 until the end of the 90 minutes to send the match into extra-time. Cissé scored again in the 103rd minute to give Liverpool the lead, which was later extended by Luis García. Liverpool held out until the end of extra-time to win the match 3–1, their third Super Cup win.

== Background ==
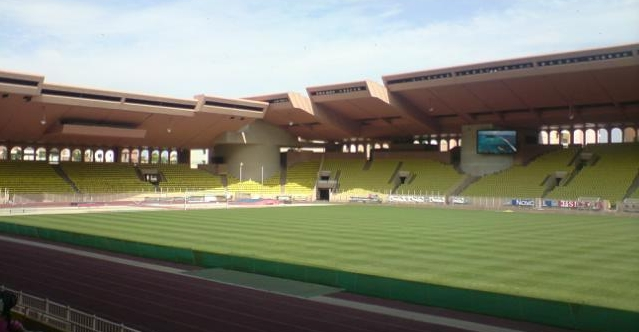
The Stade Louis II, which was the venue for the UEFA Super Cup from 1998 to 2012

Liverpool qualified for the UEFA Super Cup as the reigning UEFA Champions League winners. They had won the Champions League beating A.C. Milan 3–2 in a penalty shoot-out after the match had finished 3–3. It would be Liverpool's fifth appearance in the Super Cup. They had previously won the competition in 1977 and 2001, beating Hamburger SV and Bayern Munich respectively. The two other appearances in 1978 and 1984 had resulted in losses to Anderlecht and Juventus respectively.

CSKA Moscow had qualified for the Super Cup as a result of winning the 2004–05 UEFA Cup. They had beaten Sporting CP 3–1 to become the first Russian team to win a European trophy. Therefore, they were making their first appearance in the competition and were the first Russian team to compete in the Super Cup.

Both sides had played several matches already, which was unusual, as the Super Cup would normally have been the first significant match the two teams had played. Liverpool had been forced to enter the first qualifying round of the 2005–06 UEFA Champions League, despite being champions. They had failed to finish in the top four during the 2004–05 FA Premier League, which would ensure Champions League qualification. UEFA granted them special dispensation to enter the competition as holders. Meanwhile, CSKA Moscow were in the middle of their domestic season. At the time of this match, they were second in the 2005 Russian Premier League, seven points behind leaders Lokomotiv Moscow.

Both teams valued the competition, despite some commentators being dismissive of the match's importance. CSKA captain Sergei Ignashevich underlined his team's determined mood: "We know their players are very strong because they won the Champions League. But we are not thinking about individuals. We will only worry about ourselves and not them." Likewise, Liverpool captain Steven Gerrard was equally determined to be successful: "This is the opportunity to win another trophy. When you play against good teams you have to do your best. I am not thinking about the past and that we won the Champions League."

CSKA and Liverpool had injury concerns ahead of the match. CSKA striker Ivica Olić, the top scorer in Russia at the time, was sidelined with a serious knee injury. However, fellow CSKA striker Vágner Love was said by manager Valery Gazzaev to have "no problems" over his leg injury. Liverpool were without injured duo Djimi Traoré and Peter Crouch. There was also doubt over whether their captain Steven Gerrard would play. The decision over whether his calf injury had healed sufficiently for the match was left to the last moment. However, Gerrard was not deemed fit enough to play and was left out of the squad. The lead up to the match had been changed from the previous year. The UEFA Club Football Awards were incorporated into the draw for the group stage of the 2005–06 UEFA Champions League on the day before the match.

== Match ==
=== Summary ===
CSKA kicked off, but Liverpool had the first chance of the match. Dietmar Hamann shot from 20 yards (18 m) but his shot was saved by CSKA goalkeeper Igor Akinfeev. 11 minutes after the start of the match, Luis García was put through on goal from a pass by Hamann, but before he could shoot, Akinfeev had smothered the ball. García was put through on goal again moments later from a Boudewijn Zenden pass but his shot went over the crossbar. Midway through the first-half, García found Fernando Morientes 25 yards (23 m) from goal with a pass, but Morientes' subsequent shot was saved by Akinfeev. At this point in the match, Liverpool were dominating possession but were unable to convert this into goals. With Liverpool dominating for the majority of the half, CSKA scored against the run of play. Midfielder Daniel Carvalho took the ball past Liverpool goalkeeper Pepe Reina and put the ball into an open goal to give CSKA a 1–0 lead. It was not until the 36th minute that Liverpool created another goalscoring opportunity; however, García and Steve Finnan both failed to score. Towards the end of the half, Zenden was shown a yellow card for a late tackle on Chidi Odiah.

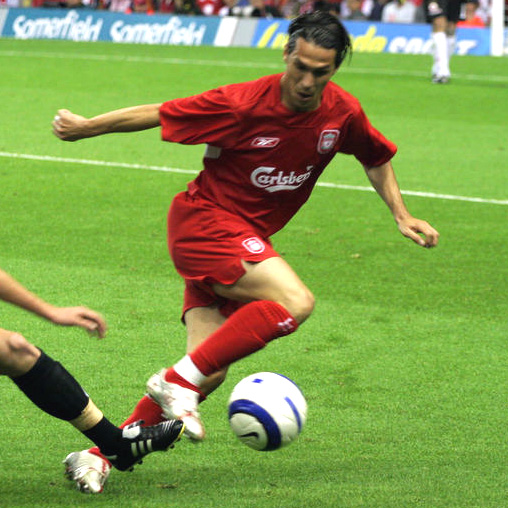
Luis García scored Liverpool's third goal

Liverpool kicked off the second half and five minutes into the half Liverpool defender Josemi was shown a yellow card for fouling Miloš Krasić. Liverpool's poor play in front of goal continued after the restart; Josemi had a chance to score, but his shot from the edge of the penalty area went over the crossbar. After the attack, Liverpool made the first substitution of the match; Florent Sinama Pongolle replaced Finnan. After just over an hour's play, a mix-up between Reina and Sami Hyypiä nearly contrived to present a goal to CSKA, before Hyypiä intervened to clear the ball. CSKA made their first substitution in the 66th minute with Deividas Šemberas replacing Yuri Zhirkov. Liverpool followed this by replacing Xabi Alonso with Mohamed Sissoko. Vágner Love had a chance to extend CSKA's lead in the 77th minute, but he was unable to control the ball after a high pass and lost possession. Despite their lead, CSKA were negative in their play; they were punished when Liverpool replaced John Arne Riise with striker Djibril Cissé. Cissé made an immediate impact; he ran on to a pass from García. The pass was cleared by CSKA defender Sergei Ignashevich but it ricocheted off Cissé and left him with an open goal after Akinfeev had come off his line in an attempt to clear the ball. Cissé's goal meant the match was now drawn at 1–1, and with no further goals, the match went into extra-time.

CSKA kicked off the first half of extra-time. Five minutes into the half, Liverpool substitute Sinama Pongolle was booked. With two minutes of the half remaining, the ball was played into the centre of the CSKA half; Ignashevich misjudged the flight of the ball, which went over his head and fell to Cissé. His subsequent shot was saved by Akinfeev, but the ball rebounded to Cissé who scored to give Liverpool a 2–1 lead. The half was brought to an end with Liverpool leading for the first time in the match. Liverpool kicked off the second half of extra-time. CSKA had the first chance of the half, but Vágner Love's effort was easily saved by Reina. Liverpool responded midway through the half; Cissé's cross from the right side of the pitch was met by García, who scored. No further goals were scored, and the referee blew for full-time with the final score 3–1 to Liverpool.

=== Details ===
26 August 2005
20:45 CEST

Liverpool (England)	3–1 (a.e.t.)	(Russia) CSKA Moscow
Cissé 82', 103'; García 109'	Report	Carvalho 28'

Stade Louis II, Monaco
Attendance: 17,042
Referee: René Temmink (Netherlands)

Liverpool	CSKA Moscow

GK	25	(Spain) Pepe Reina
RB	17	(Spain) Josemi	(yellow card) 50'
CB	23	(England) Jamie Carragher (c)
CB	4	(Finland) Sami Hyypiä	(yellow card) 73'
LB	6	(Norway) John Arne Riise		(substituted off) 79'
CM	14	(Spain) Xabi Alonso		(substituted off) 70'
CM	16	(Germany) Dietmar Hamann
RW	3	(Republic of Ireland) Steve Finnan		(substituted off) 55'
AM	10	(Spain) Luis García
LW	30	(Netherlands) Boudewijn Zenden	(yellow card) 38'
CF	19	(Spain) Fernando Morientes
Substitutes:
GK	20	(England) Scott Carson
DF	28	(England) Stephen Warnock
MF	22	(Mali) Mohamed Sissoko		(substituted on) 70'
FW	9	(France) Djibril Cissé		(substituted on) 79'
FW	24	(France) Sinama Pongolle	(yellow card) 95'	(substituted on) 55'
Manager:
(Spain) Rafael Benítez

GK	35	(Russia) Igor Akinfeev
CB	24	(Russia) Vasili Berezutski
CB	4	(Russia) Sergei Ignashevich (c)
CB	6	(Russia) Aleksei Berezutski
RM	15	(Nigeria) Chidi Odiah		(substituted off) 90'
CM	25	(Bosnia and Herzegovina) Elvir Rahimić
CM	22	(Russia) Evgeni Aldonin
LM	18	(Russia) Yuri Zhirkov		(substituted off) 66'
RW	17	(Serbia and Montenegro) Miloš Krasić		(substituted off) 85'
LW	7	(Brazil) Daniel Carvalho
CF	11	(Brazil) Vágner Love
Substitutes:
GK	1	(Russia) Veniamin Mandrykin
DF	2	(Lithuania) Deividas Šemberas		(substituted on) 66'
MF	8	(Russia) Rolan Gusev		(substituted on) 90'
MF	10	(Brazil) Dudu Cearense	(yellow card) 101'	(substituted on) 85'
FW	13	(Russia) Sergey Samodin
Manager:
(Russia) Valery Gazzaev

Man of the Match:
Djibril Cissé (Liverpool)

Assistant referees:
Adriaan Inia (Netherlands)
Rob Meenhuis (Netherlands)
Fourth official:
Eric Braamhaar (Netherlands)

Match rules

- 90 minutes
- 30 minutes of extra time if necessary
- Penalty shoot-out if scores still level
- Five named substitutes
- Maximum of three substitutions

=== Statistics ===
First half
Statistic	Liverpool	CSKA Moscow
Goals scored	0	1
Total shots	9	2
Shots on target	2	1
Saves	0	2
Ball possession	67%	33%
Corner kicks	2	0
Fouls committed	9	6
Offsides	0	1
Yellow cards	1	0
Red cards	0	0

Second half and extra time
Statistic	Liverpool	CSKA Moscow
Goals scored	3	0
Total shots	11	7
Shots on target	6	2
Saves	3	3
Ball possession	56%	64%
Corner kicks	2	3
Fouls committed	15	9
Offsides	1	4
Yellow cards	3	1
Red cards	0	0

Overall
Statistic	Liverpool	CSKA Moscow
Goals scored	3	1
Total shots	20	9
Shots on target	8	3
Saves	3	5
Ball possession	60%	40%
Corner kicks	4	3
Fouls committed	24	15
Offsides	1	5
Yellow cards	4	1
Red cards	0	0

== Post-match ==
Liverpool manager Rafael Benítez was happy with his players after they had come from behind to win the match: "It was a difficult game. We were controlling the game, passing the ball around and then we made a mistake and had to work really hard to get back. They played well, but I think we controlled the game. To score three goals is not easy. I can say that we are very happy now with this trophy. Now is the time to enjoy our victory." With five days of the transfer window left, Benítez refused to speculate on whether Liverpool would sign Michael Owen, stating, "I like good players, we have a lot of them here."

CSKA manager Valery Gazzaev praised his players despite their loss and hinted that injuries may have been a factor in the loss: "The game was satisfactory – we had followed the plan we set out, but still we made two mistakes. On the whole I think our team played very well but of course it is a shame we didn't win. We had a lot of good opportunities but we couldn't do it. Liverpool played as we expected – they played quite aggressively. We didn't feel uncomfortable but we made a couple of mistakes." Gazzaev rued the injuries his team suffered indicating there might have been a different outcome had certain players been fit.

Despite Cissé's two goals, there had been speculation linking Liverpool with re-signing Michael Owen, who had left the club for Real Madrid a year earlier. Liverpool fans had even chanted Owen's name during the match, singing, "There's only one Michael Owen." Cissé underlined the importance of scoring twice with speculation rife: "It is clear scoring two goals in the Super Cup is important for me, because there has been a lot of speculation about me of late and about my position within the club." Liverpool defender Jamie Carragher stated the importance of the two goals for Cissé: "Cissé wanted to prove a point – he wanted to show everyone what he can do and great credit to him. We're the players – it's up to us to play and the management decides which players we have." Carragher confirmed that Liverpool missed their captain Gerrard, but was delighted to win the match despite this.

== See also ==
- 2005–06 UEFA Champions League
- 2005–06 UEFA Cup
- 2005 PFC CSKA Moscow season
- 2005–06 Liverpool F.C. season
- Liverpool F.C. in international football
- PFC CSKA Moscow in European football
