= 1964 European Cup Winners' Cup final =

- Match programme cover
- Event: 1963–64 European Cup Winners' Cup
Sporting CP	MTK Budapest
(Portugal)	(Hungary)
- Sporting CP won after a replay

Final
Sporting CP	MTK Budapest
3	3
- After extra time
- Date: 13 May 1964
- Venue: Heysel Stadium, Brussels
- Referee: Lucien van Nuffel (Belgium)
- Attendance: 3,208

Replay
Sporting CP	MTK Budapest
1	0
- Date: 15 May 1964
- Venue: Bosuilstadion, Antwerp
- Referee: Gérard Versyp (Belgium)
- Attendance: 13,924

The 1964 European Cup Winners' Cup Final was a football match contested between Sporting CP of Portugal and MTK Budapest of Hungary. The fourth European Cup Winners' Cup final, the match was played at Heysel Stadium, Brussels, ending in a 3–3 tie after extra time, and the therefore necessary replay two days later in Bosuil Stadium, Antwerp. Sporting won the replay 1–0, with a famous direct corner kick goal by João Morais.

== Route to the final ==
(Portugal) Sporting CP						(Hungary) MTK Budapest				
Opponent	Agg.	1st leg	2nd leg	Replay		Opponent	Agg.	1st leg	2nd leg	Replay
(Italy) Atalanta	3–3 (r)	0–2 (A)	3–1 (aet) (H)	3–1 (aet)	First round	(Bulgaria) Slavia Sofia	2–1	1–0 (H)	1–1 (A)	
(Cyprus) APOEL	18–1	16–1 (H)	2–0 (A)		Second round	(East Germany) Motor Zwickau	2–1	0–1 (A)	2–0 (H)	
(England) Manchester United	6–4	1–4 (A)	5–0 (H)		Quarter-finals	(Turkey) Fenerbahçe	3–3 (r)	2–0 (H)	1–3 (aet) (A)	1–0
(France) Lyon	1–1 (r)	0–0 (A)	1–1 (aet) (H)	1–0	Semi-finals	(Scotland) Celtic	4–3	0–3 (A)	4–0 (H)	

== Match ==
=== Details ===
13 May 1964
19:30 CET

Sporting CP (Portugal)	3–3 (a.e.t.)	(Hungary) MTK Budapest
Mascarenhas 40'; Figueiredo 45', 80'	Report	Sándor 19', 75'; Kuti 73'

Heysel Stadium, Brussels
Attendance: 3,208
Referee: Lucien van Nuffel (Belgium)

Sporting CP	MTK Budapest

GK	1	(Portugal) Joaquim Carvalho
DF	2	(Portugal) Pedro Gomes
DF	3	(Portugal) João Morais
DF	4	(Portugal) José Carlos
DF	5	(Portugal) Alexandre Baptista
MF	6	(Portugal) Fernando Mendes (c)
MF	7	(Portugal) Géo Carvalho
MF	8	(Portugal) Mascarenhas
FW	9	(Brazil) Bé Bocareli
FW	10	(Portugal) Ernesto Figueiredo
MF	11	(Portugal) Osvaldo da Silva
Manager:
(Portugal) Anselmo Fernández

GK	1	(Hungary) Ferenc Kovalik
DF	2	(Hungary) György Keszei
DF	3	(Hungary) István Nagy
DF	4	(Hungary) József Danszky
DF	5	(Hungary) István Jenei
MF	6	(Hungary) Ferenc Kovács
MF	7	(Hungary) Károly Sándor
MF	8	(Hungary) Mihály Vasas
FW	9	(Hungary) István Kuti
FW	10	(Hungary) István Halápi
MF	11	(Hungary) László Bödör
Manager:
(Hungary) Béla Volentik

=== Replay ===
15 May 1964
19:30 CET

Sporting CP (Portugal)	1–0	(Hungary) MTK Budapest
Morais 20'	Report

Bosuil Stadium, Antwerp
Attendance: 13,924
Referee: Gérard Versyp (Belgium)

Sporting CP	MTK Budapest

GK	1	(Portugal) Joaquim Carvalho
DF	2	(Portugal) Pedro Gomes
DF	3	(Portugal) João Morais
DF	4	(Portugal) José Carlos
DF	5	(Portugal) Alexandre Baptista
MF	6	(Portugal) Fernando Mendes (c)
MF	7	(Portugal) Géo Carvalho
MF	8	(Portugal) Mascarenhas
FW	9	(Portugal) José Pérides
FW	10	(Portugal) Ernesto Figueiredo
MF	11	(Portugal) Osvaldo da Silva
Manager:
(Portugal) Anselmo Fernández

GK	1	(Hungary) Ferenc Kovalik
DF	2	(Hungary) György Keszei
DF	3	(Hungary) István Nagy
DF	4	(Hungary) József Danszky
DF	5	(Hungary) István Jenei
MF	6	(Hungary) Ferenc Kovács
MF	7	(Hungary) Károly Sándor
MF	8	(Hungary) Mihály Vasas
FW	9	(Hungary) István Kuti
FW	10	(Hungary) István Halápi
MF	11	(Hungary) László Bödör
Manager:
(Hungary) Béla Volentik

== See also ==
- MTK Budapest FC in European football
- Sporting CP in European football
