= Sporting CP in European football =

The following article lists Sporting Clube de Portugal's history and statistics in UEFA competitions.

== 1963–64 Cup Winners' Cup ==
The 1963–64 European Cup Winners' Cup was won by Sporting CP, who defeated MTK Budapest of Hungary in the final. It was the first and only time a Portuguese team side has won a UEFA Cup Winners' Cup trophy.

Sporting began the competition by defeating Atalanta in the qualifying round, got past APOEL with the biggest club win in UEFA competitions (16–1), Manchester United, Lyon and in the end defeated MTK Budapest, the same final that was played over two legs on neutral ground. Sporting thus lifted their first European title.

== Honours ==
- European Cup Winners' Cup

- Winners (1): 1963−64

- UEFA Cup

- Runners-up (1): 2004–05

== Matches ==
=== From 1955–56 to 1979–80 ===
| Season | Competition | Round | Opponent | Home | Away | Agg. |
|---|---|---|---|---|---|---|
| 1955–56 | European Cup | R1 | (Socialist Federal Republic of Yugoslavia) Partizan | 3–3 | 2–5 | 5–8 |
| 1958–59 | European Cup | PR | (Netherlands) Utrecht | 2–1 | 4–3 | 6–4 |
| 1958–59 | European Cup | R1 | (Belgium) Standard Liège | 2–3 | 0–3 | 2–6 |
| 1961–62 | European Cup | PR | (Socialist Federal Republic of Yugoslavia) Partizan | 1–1 | 0–2 | 1–3 |
| 1962–63 | European Cup | PR | (Republic of Ireland) Shelbourne | 5–1 | 2–0 | 7–1 |
| 1962–63 | European Cup | R1 | (Scotland) Dundee | 1–0 | 1–4 | 2–4 |
| 1963–64 | Cup Winners' Cup | R1 | (Italy) Atalanta | 3–1 | 0–2 | 3–3 (3–1 (aet) rep) |
| 1963–64 | Cup Winners' Cup | R2 | (Cyprus) APOEL | 16–1 | 2–0 | 18–1 |
| 1963–64 | Cup Winners' Cup | QF | (England) Manchester United | 5–0 | 1–4 | 6–4 |
| 1963–64 | Cup Winners' Cup | SF | (France) Lyon | 1–1 | 0–0 | 1–1 (3–1 rep) |
| 1963–64 | Cup Winners' Cup | F | (Hungary) MTK Budapest | —N/a | —N/a | 3–3 (1–0 rep) |
| 1964–65 | Cup Winners' Cup | R1 | Bye | | | |
| 1964–65 | Cup Winners' Cup | R2 | (Wales) Cardiff City | 1–2 | 0–0 | 1–2 |
| 1965–66 | Inter-Cities Fairs Cup | R1 | (France) Bordeaux | 4–0 | 6–1 | 10–1 |
| 1965–66 | Inter-Cities Fairs Cup | R2 | (Spain) Espanyol | 2–1 | 3–4 | 5–5 (1–2 rep) |
| 1966–67 | European Cup | R1 | (Hungary) Vasas | 0–2 | 0–5 | 0–7 |
| 1967–68 | Inter-Cities Fairs Cup | R1 | (Belgium) Club Brugge | 0–0 | 2–1 | 2–1 |
| 1967–68 | Inter-Cities Fairs Cup | R2 | (Italy) Fiorentina | 2–1 | 1–1 | 3–2 |
| 1967–68 | Inter-Cities Fairs Cup | R3 | (Switzerland) Zürich | 0–3 | 1–0 | 1–3 |
| 1968–69 | Inter-Cities Fairs Cup | R1 | (Spain) Valencia | 4–0 | 1–4 (aet) | 5–4 |
| 1968–69 | Inter-Cities Fairs Cup | R2 | (England) Newcastle United | 1–1 | 0–1 | 1–2 |
| 1969–70 | Inter-Cities Fairs Cup | R1 | (Austria) LASK Linz | 4–0 | 2–2 | 6–2 |
| 1969–70 | Inter-Cities Fairs Cup | R2 | (England) Arsenal | 0–0 | 0–3 | 0–3 |
| 1970–71 | European Cup | R1 | (Malta) Floriana | 5–0 | 4–0 | 9–0 |
| 1970–71 | European Cup | R2 | (East Germany) Carl Zeiss Jena | 1–2 | 1–2 | 2–4 |
| 1971–72 | Cup Winners' Cup | R1 | (Norway) Lyn | 4–0 | 3–0 | 7–0 |
| 1971–72 | Cup Winners' Cup | R2 | (Scotland) Rangers | 4–3 (aet) | 2–3 | 6–6 (a) |
| 1972–73 | Cup Winners' Cup | R1 | (Scotland) Hibernian | 2–1 | 1–6 | 3–7 |
| 1973–74 | Cup Winners' Cup | R1 | (Wales) Cardiff City | 0–0 | 2–1 | 2–1 |
| 1973–74 | Cup Winners' Cup | R2 | (England) Sunderland | 2–0 | 1–2 | 3–2 |
| 1973–74 | Cup Winners' Cup | QF | (Switzerland) Zürich | 3–0 | 1–1 | 4–1 |
| 1973–74 | Cup Winners' Cup | SF | (East Germany) Magdeburg | 1–1 | 1–2 | 2–3 |
| 1974–75 | European Cup | R1 | (France) Saint-Étienne | 1–1 | 0–2 | 1–3 |
| 1975–76 | UEFA Cup | R1 | (Malta) Sliema Wanderers | 2–1 | 3–1 | 5–2 |
| 1975–76 | UEFA Cup | R2 | (Hungary) Vasas | 2–1 | 1–3 | 3–4 |
| 1977–78 | UEFA Cup | R1 | (France) Bastia | 2–3 | 1–2 | 3–5 |
| 1978–79 | Cup Winners' Cup | R1 | (Czechoslovakia) Baník Ostrava | 0–1 | 0–1 | 0–2 |
| 1979–80 | UEFA Cup | R1 | (Republic of Ireland) Bohemians | 2–0 | 0–0 | 2–0 |
| 1979–80 | UEFA Cup | R2 | (West Germany) Kaiserslautern | 1–1 | 0–2 | 1–3 |

Note: Sporting CP score always listed first.

=== From 1980–81 to 1999–2000 ===
| Season | Competition | Round | Opponent | Home | Away | Agg. |
|---|---|---|---|---|---|---|
| 1980–81 | European Cup | R1 | (Hungary) Budapest Honvéd | 0–2 | 0–1 | 0–3 |
| 1981–82 | UEFA Cup | R1 | (Luxembourg) Red Boys Differdange | 4–0 | 7–0 | 11–0 |
| 1981–82 | UEFA Cup | R2 | (England) Southampton | 0–0 | 4–2 | 4–2 |
| 1981–82 | UEFA Cup | R3 | (Switzerland) Neuchâtel Xamax | 0–0 | 0–1 | 0–1 |
| 1982–83 | European Cup | R1 | (Socialist Federal Republic of Yugoslavia) Dinamo Zagreb | 3–0 | 0–1 | 3–1 |
| 1982–83 | European Cup | R2 | (Bulgaria) CSKA September Flag | 0–0 | 2–2 | 2–2 (a) |
| 1982–83 | European Cup | QF | (Spain) Real Sociedad | 1–0 | 0–2 | 1–2 |
| 1983–84 | UEFA Cup | R1 | (Spain) Sevilla | 3–2 | 1–1 | 4–3 |
| 1983–84 | UEFA Cup | R2 | (Scotland) Celtic | 2–0 | 0–5 | 2–5 |
| 1984–85 | UEFA Cup | R1 | (France) Auxerre | 2–0 | 2–2 (aet) | 4–2 |
| 1984–85 | UEFA Cup | R2 | (Soviet Union) Dinamo Minsk | 2–0 | 0–2 (aet) | 2–2 (3–5 p) |
| 1985–86 | UEFA Cup | R1 | (Netherlands) Feyenoord | 3–1 | 1–2 | 4–3 |
| 1985–86 | UEFA Cup | R2 | (Albania) Dinamo Tirana | 1–0 | 0–0 | 1–0 |
| 1985–86 | UEFA Cup | R3 | (Spain) Athletic Bilbao | 3–0 | 1–2 | 4–2 |
| 1985–86 | UEFA Cup | QF | (West Germany) Köln | 1–1 | 0–2 | 1–3 |
| 1986–87 | UEFA Cup | R1 | (Iceland) ÍA | 6–0 | 9–0 | 15–0 |
| 1986–87 | UEFA Cup | R2 | (Spain) Barcelona | 2–1 | 0–1 | 2–2 (a) |
| 1987–88 | Cup Winners' Cup | R1 | (Austria) Swarovski Tirol | 4–0 | 2–4 | 6–4 |
| 1987–88 | Cup Winners' Cup | R2 | (Sweden) Kalmar FF | 5–0 | 0–1 | 5–1 |
| 1987–88 | Cup Winners' Cup | QF | (Italy) Atalanta | 1–1 | 0–2 | 1–3 |
| 1988–89 | UEFA Cup | R1 | (Netherlands) Ajax | 4–2 | 2–1 | 6–3 |
| 1988–89 | UEFA Cup | R2 | (Spain) Real Sociedad | 1–2 | 0–0 | 1–2 |
| 1989–90 | UEFA Cup | R1 | (Italy) Napoli | 0–0 | 0–0 (aet) | 0–0 (3–4 p) |
| 1990–91 | UEFA Cup | R1 | (Belgium) Mechelen | 1–0 | 2–2 | 3–2 |
| 1990–91 | UEFA Cup | R2 | (Romania) Politehnica Timișoara | 7–0 | 0–2 | 7–2 |
| 1990–91 | UEFA Cup | R3 | (Netherlands) Vitesse | 2–1 | 2–0 | 4–1 |
| 1990–91 | UEFA Cup | QF | (Italy) Bologna | 2–0 | 1–1 | 3–1 |
| 1990–91 | UEFA Cup | SF | (Italy) Internazionale | 0–0 | 0–2 | 0–2 |
| 1991–92 | UEFA Cup | R1 | (Romania) Dinamo București | 1–0 | 0–2 (aet) | 1–2 |
| 1992–93 | UEFA Cup | R1 | (Switzerland) Grasshopper | 1–3 (aet) | 2–1 | 3–4 |
| 1993–94 | UEFA Cup | R1 | (Turkey) Kocaelispor | 2–0 | 0–0 | 2–0 |
| 1993–94 | UEFA Cup | R2 | (Scotland) Celtic | 2–0 | 0–1 | 1–0 |
| 1993–94 | UEFA Cup | R3 | (Austria) Casino Salzburg | 2–0 | 0–3 (aet) | 2–3 |
| 1994–95 | UEFA Cup | R1 | (Spain) Real Madrid | 2–1 | 0–1 | 2–2 (a) |
| 1995–96 | UEFA Cup Winners' Cup | R1 | (Israel) Maccabi Haifa | 4–0 | 0–0 | 4–0 |
| 1995–96 | UEFA Cup Winners' Cup | R2 | (Austria) Rapid Wien | 2–0 | 0–4 (aet) | 2–4 |
| 1996–97 | UEFA Cup | R1 | (France) Montpellier | 1–0 | 1–1 | 2–1 |
| 1996–97 | UEFA Cup | R2 | (France) Metz | 2–1 | 0–2 | 2–3 |
| 1997–98 | UEFA Champions League | QR2 | (Israel) Beitar Jerusalem | 3–0 | 0–0 | 3–0 |
| 1997–98 | UEFA Champions League | GS | (France) Monaco | 3–0 | 2–3 | 3rd |
| 1997–98 | UEFA Champions League | GS | (Belgium) Lierse | 2–1 | 1–1 | 3rd |
| 1997–98 | UEFA Champions League | GS | (Germany) Bayer Leverkusen | 0–2 | 1–4 | 3rd |
| 1998–99 | UEFA Cup | R1 | (Italy) Bologna | 0–2 | 1–2 | 1–4 |
| 1999–2000 | UEFA Cup | R1 | (Norway) Viking | 1–0 | 0–3 | 1–3 |

Note: Sporting CP score always listed first.

=== From 2000–01 to present ===
| Season | Competition | Round | Opponent | Home | Away | Agg. |
|---|---|---|---|---|---|---|
| 2000–01 | UEFA Champions League | GS1 | (Spain) Real Madrid | 2–2 | 0–4 | 4th |
| 2000–01 | UEFA Champions League | GS1 | (Germany) Bayer Leverkusen | 0–0 | 2–3 | 4th |
| 2000–01 | UEFA Champions League | GS1 | (Russia) Spartak Moscow | 0–3 | 1–3 | 4th |
| 2001–02 | UEFA Cup | R1 | (Denmark) Midtjylland | 3–2 | 3–0 | 6–3 |
| 2001–02 | UEFA Cup | R2 | (Sweden) Halmstad | 6–1 | 1–0 | 7–1 |
| 2001–02 | UEFA Cup | R3 | (Italy) Milan | 1–1 | 0–2 | 1–3 |
| 2002–03 | UEFA Champions League | QR3 | (Italy) Internazionale | 0–0 | 0–2 | 0–2 |
| 2002–03 | UEFA Cup | R1 | (Serbia and Montenegro) Partizan | 1–3 | 3–3 (a.e.t.) | 4–6 |
| 2003–04 | UEFA Cup | R1 | (Sweden) Malmö FF | 2–0 | 1–0 | 3–0 |
| 2003–04 | UEFA Cup | R2 | (Turkey) Gençlerbirliği | 0–3 | 1–1 | 1–4 |
| 2004–05 | UEFA Cup | R1 | (Austria) Rapid Wien | 2–0 | 0–0 | 2–0 |
| 2004–05 | UEFA Cup | GS | (Greece) Panionios | 4–1 | —N/a | 3rd |
| 2004–05 | UEFA Cup | GS | (Georgia (country)) Dinamo Tbilisi | —N/a | 4–0 | 3rd |
| 2004–05 | UEFA Cup | GS | (France) Sochaux | 0–1 | —N/a | 3rd |
| 2004–05 | UEFA Cup | GS | (England) Newcastle United | —N/a | 1–1 | 3rd |
| 2004–05 | UEFA Cup | R32 | (Netherlands) Feyenoord | 2–1 | 2–1 | 4–2 |
| 2004–05 | UEFA Cup | R16 | (England) Middlesbrough | 1–0 | 3–2 | 4–2 |
| 2004–05 | UEFA Cup | QF | (England) Newcastle United | 4–1 | 0–1 | 4–2 |
| 2004–05 | UEFA Cup | SF | (Netherlands) AZ | 2–1 | 2–3 (a.e.t.) | 4–4 (a) |
| 2004–05 | UEFA Cup | F | (Russia) CSKA Moscow | —N/a | —N/a | 1–3 |
| 2005–06 | UEFA Champions League | QR3 | (Italy) Udinese | 0–1 | 2–3 | 2–4 |
| 2005–06 | UEFA Cup | R1 | (Sweden) Halmstad | 2–3 (a.e.t.) | 2–1 | 4–4 (a) |
| 2006–07 | UEFA Champions League | GS | (Italy) Internazionale | 1–0 | 0–1 | 4th |
| 2006–07 | UEFA Champions League | GS | (Russia) Spartak Moscow | 1–3 | 1–1 | 4th |
| 2006–07 | UEFA Champions League | GS | (Germany) Bayern Munich | 0–1 | 0–0 | 4th |
| 2007–08 | UEFA Champions League | GS | (England) Manchester United | 0–1 | 1–2 | 3rd |
| 2007–08 | UEFA Champions League | GS | (Ukraine) Dynamo Kyiv | 2–1 | 3–0 | 3rd |
| 2007–08 | UEFA Champions League | GS | (Italy) Roma | 2–2 | 1–2 | 3rd |
| 2007–08 | UEFA Cup | R32 | (Switzerland) Basel | 2–0 | 3–0 | 5–0 |
| 2007–08 | UEFA Cup | R16 | (England) Bolton Wanderers | 1–0 | 1–1 | 2–1 |
| 2007–08 | UEFA Cup | QF | (Scotland) Rangers | 0–2 | 0–0 | 0–2 |
| 2008–09 | UEFA Champions League | GS | (Spain) Barcelona | 2–5 | 1–3 | 2nd |
| 2008–09 | UEFA Champions League | GS | (Switzerland) Basel | 2–0 | 1–0 | 2nd |
| 2008–09 | UEFA Champions League | GS | (Ukraine) Shakhtar Donetsk | 1–0 | 1–0 | 2nd |
| 2008–09 | UEFA Champions League | R16 | (Germany) Bayern Munich | 0–5 | 1–7 | 1–12 |
| 2009–10 | UEFA Champions League | QR3 | (Netherlands) Twente | 0–0 | 1–1 | 1–1 (a) |
| 2009–10 | UEFA Champions League | PO | (Italy) Fiorentina | 2–2 | 1–1 | 3–3 (a) |
| 2009–10 | UEFA Europa League | GS | (Netherlands) Heerenveen | 1–1 | 3–2 | 1st |
| 2009–10 | UEFA Europa League | GS | (Germany) Hertha BSC | 1–0 | 0–1 | 1st |
| 2009–10 | UEFA Europa League | GS | (Latvia) Ventspils | 1–1 | 2–1 | 1st |
| 2009–10 | UEFA Europa League | R32 | (England) Everton | 1–2 | 3–0 | 4–2 |
| 2009–10 | UEFA Europa League | R16 | (Spain) Atlético Madrid | 2–2 | 0–0 | 2–2 (a) |
| 2010–11 | UEFA Europa League | QR3 | (Denmark) Nordsjælland | 2–1 | 1–0 | 3–1 |
| 2010–11 | UEFA Europa League | PO | (Denmark) Brøndby | 0–2 | 3–0 | 3–2 |
| 2010–11 | UEFA Europa League | GS | (France) Lille | 1–0 | 2–1 | 1st |
| 2010–11 | UEFA Europa League | GS | (Bulgaria) Levski Sofia | 5–0 | 0–1 | 1st |
| 2010–11 | UEFA Europa League | GS | (Belgium) Gent | 5–1 | 1–3 | 1st |
| 2010–11 | UEFA Europa League | R32 | (Scotland) Rangers | 2–2 | 1–1 | 3–3 (a) |
| 2011–12 | UEFA Europa League | PO | (Denmark) Nordsjælland | 2–1 | 0–0 | 2–1 |
| 2011–12 | UEFA Europa League | GS | (Switzerland) Zürich | 2–0 | 2–0 | 1st |
| 2011–12 | UEFA Europa League | GS | (Italy) Lazio | 2–1 | 0–2 | 1st |
| 2011–12 | UEFA Europa League | GS | (Romania) Vaslui | 2–0 | 0–1 | 1st |
| 2011–12 | UEFA Europa League | R32 | (Poland) Legia Warsaw | 1–0 | 2–2 | 3–2 |
| 2011–12 | UEFA Europa League | R16 | (England) Manchester City | 1–0 | 2–3 | 3–3 (a) |
| 2011–12 | UEFA Europa League | QF | (Ukraine) Metalist Kharkiv | 2–1 | 1–1 | 3–2 |
| 2011–12 | UEFA Europa League | SF | (Spain) Athletic Bilbao | 2–1 | 1–3 | 3–4 |
| 2012–13 | UEFA Europa League | PO | (Denmark) Horsens | 5–0 | 1–1 | 6–1 |
| 2012–13 | UEFA Europa League | GS | (Switzerland) Basel | 0–0 | 0–3 | 4th |
| 2012–13 | UEFA Europa League | GS | (Hungary) Videoton | 2–1 | 0–3 | 4th |
| 2012–13 | UEFA Europa League | GS | (Belgium) Genk | 1–1 | 1–2 | 4th |
| 2014–15 | UEFA Champions League | GS | (Slovenia) Maribor | 3–1 | 1–1 | 3rd |
| 2014–15 | UEFA Champions League | GS | (England) Chelsea | 0–1 | 1–3 | 3rd |
| 2014–15 | UEFA Champions League | GS | (Germany) Schalke 04 | 4–2 | 3–4 | 3rd |
| 2014–15 | UEFA Europa League | R32 | (Germany) VfL Wolfsburg | 0–0 | 0–2 | 0–2 |
| 2015–16 | UEFA Champions League | PO | (Russia) CSKA Moscow | 2–1 | 1–3 | 3–4 |
| 2015–16 | UEFA Europa League | GS | (Russia) Lokomotiv Moscow | 1–3 | 4–2 | 2nd |
| 2015–16 | UEFA Europa League | GS | (Turkey) Beşiktaş | 3–1 | 1–1 | 2nd |
| 2015–16 | UEFA Europa League | GS | (Albania) Skënderbeu | 5–1 | 0–3 | 2nd |
| 2015–16 | UEFA Europa League | R32 | (Germany) Bayer Leverkusen | 0–1 | 1–3 | 1–4 |
| 2016–17 | UEFA Champions League | GS | (Spain) Real Madrid | 1–2 | 1–2 | 4th |
| 2016–17 | UEFA Champions League | GS | (Poland) Legia Warsaw | 2–0 | 0–1 | 4th |
| 2016–17 | UEFA Champions League | GS | (Germany) Borussia Dortmund | 1–2 | 0–1 | 4th |
| 2017–18 | UEFA Champions League | PO | (Romania) FCSB | 0–0 | 5–1 | 5–1 |
| 2017–18 | UEFA Champions League | GS | (Greece) Olympiacos | 3–1 | 3–2 | 3rd |
| 2017–18 | UEFA Champions League | GS | (Spain) Barcelona | 0–1 | 0–2 | 3rd |
| 2017–18 | UEFA Champions League | GS | (Italy) Juventus | 1–1 | 1–2 | 3rd |
| 2017–18 | UEFA Europa League | R32 | (Kazakhstan) Astana | 3–3 | 3–1 | 6–4 |
| 2017–18 | UEFA Europa League | R16 | (Czech Republic) Viktoria Plzeň | 2–0 | 1–2 (a.e.t.) | 3–2 |
| 2017–18 | UEFA Europa League | QF | (Spain) Atlético Madrid | 1–0 | 0–2 | 1–2 |
| 2018–19 | UEFA Europa League | GS | (Azerbaijan) Qarabağ | 2–0 | 6–1 | 2nd |
| 2018–19 | UEFA Europa League | GS | (Ukraine) Vorskla Poltava | 3–0 | 2–1 | 2nd |
| 2018–19 | UEFA Europa League | GS | (England) Arsenal | 0–1 | 0–0 | 2nd |
| 2018–19 | UEFA Europa League | R32 | (Spain) Villarreal | 0–1 | 1–1 | 1–2 |
| 2019–20 | UEFA Europa League | GS | (Netherlands) PSV Eindhoven | 4–0 | 2–3 | 2nd |
| 2019–20 | UEFA Europa League | GS | (Norway) Rosenborg | 1–0 | 2–0 | 2nd |
| 2019–20 | UEFA Europa League | GS | (Austria) LASK | 2–1 | 0–3 | 2nd |
| 2019–20 | UEFA Europa League | R32 | (Turkey) İstanbul Başakşehir | 3–1 | 1–4 (a.e.t.) | 4–5 |
| 2020–21 | UEFA Europa League | QR3 | (Scotland) Aberdeen | 1–0 | —N/a | —N/a |
| 2020–21 | UEFA Europa League | PO | (Austria) LASK | 1–4 | —N/a | —N/a |
| 2021–22 | UEFA Champions League | GS | (Netherlands) Ajax | 1–5 | 2–4 | 2nd |
| 2021–22 | UEFA Champions League | GS | (Germany) Borussia Dortmund | 3–1 | 0–1 | 2nd |
| 2021–22 | UEFA Champions League | GS | (Turkey) Beşiktaş | 4–0 | 4–1 | 2nd |
| 2021–22 | UEFA Champions League | R16 | (England) Manchester City | 0–5 | 0–0 | 0–5 |
| 2022–23 | UEFA Champions League | GS | (Germany) Eintracht Frankfurt | 1–2 | 3–0 | 3rd |
| 2022–23 | UEFA Champions League | GS | (England) Tottenham Hotspur | 2–0 | 1–1 | 3rd |
| 2022–23 | UEFA Champions League | GS | (France) Marseille | 0–2 | 1–4 | 3rd |
| 2022–23 | UEFA Europa League | KPO | (Denmark) Midtjylland | 1–1 | 4–0 | 5–1 |
| 2022–23 | UEFA Europa League | R16 | (England) Arsenal | 2–2 (a.e.t.) | 1–1 | 3–3 (5–3 p) |
| 2022–23 | UEFA Europa League | QF | (Italy) Juventus | 1–1 | 0–1 | 1–2 |
| 2023–24 | UEFA Europa League | GS | (Austria) Sturm Graz | 3–0 | 2–1 | 2nd |
| 2023–24 | UEFA Europa League | GS | (Italy) Atalanta | 1–2 | 1–1 | 2nd |
| 2023–24 | UEFA Europa League | GS | (Poland) Raków Częstochowa | 2–1 | 1–1 | 2nd |
| 2023–24 | UEFA Europa League | KPO | (Switzerland) Young Boys | 1–1 | 3–1 | 4–2 |
| 2023–24 | UEFA Europa League | R16 | (Italy) Atalanta | 1–1 | 1–2 | 2–3 |
| 2024–25 | UEFA Champions League | LP | (France) Lille | 2–0 | —N/a | 23rd |
| 2024–25 | UEFA Champions League | LP | (Netherlands) PSV Eindhoven | —N/a | 1–1 | 23rd |
| 2024–25 | UEFA Champions League | LP | (Austria) Sturm Graz | —N/a | 2–0 | 23rd |
| 2024–25 | UEFA Champions League | LP | (England) Manchester City | 4–1 | —N/a | 23rd |
| 2024–25 | UEFA Champions League | LP | (England) Arsenal | 1–5 | —N/a | 23rd |
| 2024–25 | UEFA Champions League | LP | (Belgium) Club Brugge | —N/a | 1–2 | 23rd |
| 2024–25 | UEFA Champions League | LP | (Germany) RB Leipzig | —N/a | 1–2 | 23rd |
| 2024–25 | UEFA Champions League | LP | (Italy) Bologna | 1–1 | —N/a | 23rd |
| 2024–25 | UEFA Champions League | KPO | (Germany) Borussia Dortmund | 0–3 | 0–0 | 0–3 |
| 2025–26 | UEFA Champions League | LP | (Kazakhstan) Kairat | 4–1 | —N/a | 7th |
| 2025–26 | UEFA Champions League | LP | (Italy) Napoli | —N/a | 1–2 | 7th |
| 2025–26 | UEFA Champions League | LP | (France) Marseille | 2–1 | —N/a | 7th |
| 2025–26 | UEFA Champions League | LP | (Italy) Juventus | —N/a | 1–1 | 7th |
| 2025–26 | UEFA Champions League | LP | (Belgium) Club Brugge | 3–0 | —N/a | 7th |
| 2025–26 | UEFA Champions League | LP | (Germany) Bayern Munich | —N/a | 1–3 | 7th |
| 2025–26 | UEFA Champions League | LP | (France) Paris Saint-Germain | 2–1 | —N/a | 7th |
| 2025–26 | UEFA Champions League | LP | (Spain) Athletic Bilbao | —N/a | 3–2 | 7th |
| 2025–26 | UEFA Champions League | R16 | (Norway) Bodø/Glimt | 5–0 (a.e.t.) | 0–3 | 5–3 |
| 2025–26 | UEFA Champions League | QF | (England) Arsenal | 0–1 | 0–0 | 0–1 |
| 2026–27 | UEFA Champions League | LP | (Turkey) Galatasaray | 3–1 | —N/a | |
| 2026–27 | UEFA Champions League | LP | (France) Lens | —N/a | 2–0 | |
| 2026–27 | UEFA Champions League | LP | (Austria) LASK | 2–3 | —N/a | |
| 2026–27 | UEFA Champions League | LP | (Ukraine) Shakhtar Donetsk | —N/a | | |
| 2026–27 | UEFA Champions League | LP | (England) Manchester United | | —N/a | |
| 2026–27 | UEFA Champions League | LP | (Italy) Roma | —N/a | | |
| 2026–27 | UEFA Champions League | LP | (Spain) Barcelona | | —N/a | |
| 2026–27 | UEFA Champions League | LP | (England) Manchester City | —N/a | | |

Last updated: 21 October 2026
Note: Sporting CP score always listed first.

== Overall record ==
=== By competition ===
As of 21 October 2026

Sporting CP record in European football by competition
| Competition | Pld | W | D | L | GF | GA | GD | Win% (Note: Win% is rounded to two decimal places.) |
|---|---|---|---|---|---|---|---|---|
| UEFA Champions League / European Cup | 131 | 42 | 27 | 62 | 182 | 212 | −30 | 32.06 |
| UEFA Cup Winners' Cup | 40 | 18 | 9 | 13 | 82 | 49 | +33 | 45.00 |
| UEFA Europa League / UEFA Cup | 203 | 95 | 48 | 60 | 321 | 226 | +95 | 46.80 |
| Inter-Cities Fairs Cup | 19 | 8 | 5 | 6 | 34 | 25 | +9 | 42.11 |
| Total | 393 | 163 | 89 | 141 | 619 | 512 | +107 | 41.48 |

=== Finals ===
| Year | Competition | Opposing team | Score | Venue |
|---|---|---|---|---|
| 1964 | Cup Winners' Cup | (Hungary) MTK Budapest | 3–3 (1–0 rep) | (Belgium) Heysel Stadium, Brussels (Belgium) Bosuilstadion, Antwerp (rep) |
| 2005 | UEFA Cup | (Russia) CSKA Moscow | 1–3 | (Portugal) Estádio José Alvalade, Lisbon |
