= MTK Budapest FC in European football =

Magyar Testgyakorlók Köre Budapest Futball Club is a professional football club based in Budapest, Hungary.

== Matches ==
Season	Competition	Round	Club	Home	Away	Aggregate
1955–56	European Cup	1. Round	(Belgium) Anderlecht	6–3	4–1	10–4
1955–56	European Cup	Quarter-finals	(France) Stade Reims	4–4	2–4	6–8
1958–59	European Cup	Preliminary Round	(Poland) Polonia Bytom	3–0	3–0	6–0
1958–59	European Cup	1. Round	(Switzerland) Young Boys	1–2	1–4	2–6
1961–62	Inter-Cities Fairs Cup	1. Round	(France) Strasbourg	10–2	3–1	13–3
1961–62	Inter-Cities Fairs Cup	2. Round	(East Germany) Lokomotive Leipzig	3–0	0–3	3–3 (play-off 2–0)
1961–62	Inter-Cities Fairs Cup	Quarter-finals	(Socialist Federal Republic of Yugoslavia) Novi Sad	2–1	4–1	6–2
1961–62	Inter-Cities Fairs Cup	Semi-finals	(Spain) Valencia	3–7	0–3	3–10
1963–64	UEFA Cup Winners' Cup	Preliminary Round	(Bulgaria) Slavia Sofia	1–0	1–1	2–1
1963–64	UEFA Cup Winners' Cup	1. Round	(East Germany) Motor Zwickau	2–0	0–1	2–1
1963–64	UEFA Cup Winners' Cup	Quarter-finals	(Turkey) Fenerbahçe	2–0	1–3	3–3 (play-off 1–0)
1963–64	UEFA Cup Winners' Cup	Semi-finals	(Scotland) Celtic	4–0	0–3	4–3
1963–64	UEFA Cup Winners' Cup	Final	(Portugal) Sporting CP	3–3 (aet)		0–1 (play-off)
1969–70	UEFA Cup Winners' Cup	1. Round	(East Germany) Magdeburg	1–1	0–1	1–2 (aet)
1976–77	UEFA Cup Winners' Cup	1. Round	(Czech Republic) Sparta Prague	3–1	1–1	4–2
1976–77	UEFA Cup Winners' Cup	2. Round	(Soviet Union) Dinamo Tbilisi	1–0	4–1	5–1
1976–77	UEFA Cup Winners' Cup	Quarter-finals	(West Germany) Hamburg	1–1	1–4	2–5
1978–79	UEFA Cup	1. Round	(Romania) Politehnica Timişoara	2–1	0–2	2–3
1985	Intertoto Cup	Group 11	(Bulgaria) Chernomorets Burgas	5–1	2–1	First Place
1985	Intertoto Cup	Group 11	(Norway) IK Start	3–0	3–3	First Place
1985	Intertoto Cup	Group 11	(Switzerland) FC Aarau	3–1	1–1	First Place
1986	Intertoto Cup	Group 1	(West Germany) Fortuna Düsseldorf	0–0	3–3	Second Place
1986	Intertoto Cup	Group 1	(Netherlands) NEC Nijmegen	2–2	3–1	Second Place
1986	Intertoto Cup	Group 1	(Belgium) FC Liége	5–2	0–3	Second Place
1987–88	European Cup	1. Round	(Romania) Steaua București	2–0	0–4	2–4
1988	Intertoto Cup	Group 10	(West Germany) Karlsruher SC	2–1	1–1	Third Place
1988	Intertoto Cup	Group 10	(Socialist Federal Republic of Yugoslavia) Vojvodina	1–0	0–5	Third Place
1988	Intertoto Cup	Group 10	(Austria) Grazer AK	0–1	1–1	Third Place
1989–90	UEFA Cup	1. Round	(Soviet Union) Dynamo Kyiv	1–2	0–4	1–6
1990	Intertoto Cup	Group 4	(Czech Republic) Slovan Bratislava	0–2	0–2	Fourth Place
1990	Intertoto Cup	Group 4	(Denmark) Vejle	0–1	1–4	Fourth Place
1990	Intertoto Cup	Group 4	(Sweden) Norrköping	4–3	0–2	Fourth Place
1990–91	UEFA Cup	1. Round	(Switzerland) Luzern	1–1	1–2	2–3
1993–94	UEFA Cup	1. Round	(Iceland) Reykjavík	0–0	2–1	2–1
1993–94	UEFA Cup	2. Round	(Belgium) Mechelen	1–1	0–5	1–6
1997–98	UEFA Cup	1. Round	(Russia) Alania Vladikavkaz	3–0	1–1	4–1
1997–98	UEFA Cup	2. Round	Croatia Zagreb	1–0	0–2	1–2
1997–98	UEFA Champions League	1. Qualifying Round	(Armenia) Pyunik	4–3	2–0	6–3
1997–98	UEFA Champions League	2. Qualifying Round	(Norway) Rosenborg	0–1	1–3	1–4
1998–99	UEFA Cup Winners' Cup	Qualifying Round	(Faroe Islands) Gøta	7–0	3–1	10–1
1998–99	UEFA Cup Winners' Cup	1. Round	(Austria) Ried	0–1	0–2	0–3
1999–00	UEFA Champions League	2. Qualifying Round	(Iceland) ÍBV	3–1	2–0	5–1
1999–00	UEFA Champions League	3. Qualifying Round	Croatia Zagreb	0–2	0–0	0–2
1999–00	UEFA Cup	1. Round	(Turkey) Fenerbahçe	0–0	2–0	2–0
1999–00	UEFA Cup	2. Round	(Greece) AEK Athens	2–1	0–1	2–2 (a)
2000–01	UEFA Cup	Qualifying Round	(Finland) Jokerit	1–0	4–2	5–2
2000–01	UEFA Cup	1. Round	(Bulgaria) CSKA Sofia	0–1	2–1	2–2 (a)
2000–01	UEFA Cup	2. Round	(France) Nantes	0–1	1–2	1–3
2003–04	UEFA Champions League	2. Qualifying Round	(Finland) HJK Helsinki	3–1	0–1	3–2
2003–04	UEFA Champions League	3. Qualifying Round	(Scotland) Celtic	0–4	0–1	0–5
2003–04	UEFA Cup	1. Round	(Croatia) Dinamo Zagreb	0–0	1–3	1–3
2007–08	UEFA Cup	1. Qualifying Round	(Armenia) Mika	2–1	0–1	2–2 (a)
2008–09	UEFA Champions League	2. Qualifying Round	(Turkey) Fenerbahçe	0–5	0–2	0–7
2012–13	UEFA Europa League	1. Qualifying Round	(Slovakia) Senica	1–1	1–2	2–3
2015–16	UEFA Europa League	1. Qualifying Round	(Serbia) Vojvodina	0–0	1–3	1–3
2016–17	UEFA Europa League	1. Qualifying Round	(Kazakhstan) Aktobe	2–0	1–1	3–1
2016–17	UEFA Europa League	2. Qualifying Round	(Azerbaijan) Gabala	1–2	0–2	1–4

== Record by country of opposition ==
- Correct as of 21 July 2016

Country	Pld	W	D	L	GF	GA	GD	Win%
Austria	4	0	1	3	1	5	−4	0.00
Armenia	4	3	0	1	8	5	+3	75.00
Azerbaijan	2	0	0	2	1	4	−3	0.00
Belgium	6	3	1	2	16	15	+1	50.00
Bulgaria	6	4	1	1	11	5	+6	66.67
Croatia	6	1	2	3	2	7	−5	16.67
(Czech Republic) Czechoslovakia	4	1	1	2	4	6	−2	25.00
Denmark	2	0	0	2	1	5	−4	0.00
East Germany	7	3	1	3	8	6	+2	42.86
Faroe Islands	2	2	0	0	10	1	+9	100.00
Finland	4	3	0	1	8	4	+4	75.00
France	6	2	1	3	20	14	+6	33.33
Germany	6	1	4	1	8	10	−2	16.67
Greece	2	1	0	1	2	2	+0	50.00
Iceland	4	3	1	0	7	2	+5	75.00
Kazakhstan	2	1	1	0	3	1	+2	50.00
Netherlands	2	1	1	0	5	3	+2	50.00
Norway	4	1	1	2	7	7	+0	25.00
Poland	2	2	0	0	6	0	+6	100.00
Portugal	2	0	1	1	3	4	−1	0.00
Romania	4	2	0	2	4	7	−3	50.00
Russia	2	1	1	0	4	1	+3	50.00
Scotland	4	1	0	3	4	8	−4	25.00
Serbia	2	0	1	1	1	3	−2	0.00
Slovakia	2	0	1	1	2	3	−1	0.00
Soviet Union	4	2	0	2	6	7	−1	50.00
Spain	2	0	0	2	3	10	−7	0.00
Sweden	2	1	0	1	4	5	−1	50.00
Switzerland	6	1	2	3	8	11	−3	16.67
Turkey	7	3	1	3	6	10	−4	42.86
(Socialist Federal Republic of Yugoslavia) Yugoslavia	4	3	0	1	7	7	+0	75.00
Totals	116	46	23	47	180	178	+2	39.65

P – Played; W – Won; D – Drawn; L – Lost

== Club record in UEFA competitions ==
As correct of 22 June 2015.

- Biggest win: 27 August 1998, MTK 7–0 (Faroe Islands) Gøta, Budapest
- Biggest defeat: 6 August 2008, MTK 0–5 (Turkey) Fenerbahçe, Budapest and 20 October 1993, (Belgium) Mechelen 5–0 MTK, Mechelen
- Appearances in UEFA Champions League: 7
- Appearances in UEFA Cup Winners' Cup: 4
- Appearances in UEFA Europa League: 12
- Player with most UEFA appearances: 27 (Hungary) Illés
- Top scorers in UEFA club competitions: 10 (Hungary) Palotás
