= István Jenei =

Hungarian sports shooter

Personal information
- Born: 21 May 1953 Budapest, Hungary
- Died: 25 February 2011 (aged 57)

Sport
- Sport: Sports shooting

István Jenei (21 May 1953 – 25 February 2011) was a Hungarian sports shooter. He competed in the 50 metre running target event at the 1972 Summer Olympics.
