= PFC CSKA Moscow in European football =

Russian club in European football

These are the matches of CSKA Moscow playing in Europe.

== Overall ==
As of match played 10 December 2020

Competition	P	W	D	L	GF	GA	%W	Notes
European Cup / UEFA Champions League	104	34	24	46	125	155	32.69	Quarter-finals (2009–10)
UEFA Cup / UEFA Europa League	69	31	18	20	97	67	44.93	Champions (2004–05)
Cup Winners' Cup	4	2	0	2	5	5	50.00	First round (1991–92, 1994–95)
UEFA Super Cup	1	0	0	1	1	3	0.00	Runners-up (2005)
Total	178	67	42	69	228	230	37.64	–

== Results in European competitions ==
Season	Competition	Round	Club	Home	Away	Aggregate
1971–72	European Cup	First Round	(Turkey) Galatasaray	3–0	1–1	4–1
1971–72	European Cup	Second Round	(Belgium) Standard Liège	1–0	0–2	1–2
1981–82	UEFA Cup	First round	(Austria) Sturm Graz	2–1	0–1	2–2 (a)
1991–92	European Cup Winners' Cup	First round	(Italy) Roma	1–2	1–0	2–2 (a)
1992–93	UEFA Champions League	First Round	(Iceland) Vikingur Reykjavik	4–2	1–0	5–2
1992–93	UEFA Champions League	Second Round	(Spain) Barcelona	1–1	3–2	4–3
1992–93	UEFA Champions League	Group A	(France) Marseille	1–1	0–6	4th
1992–93	UEFA Champions League	Group A	(Scotland) Rangers	0–1	0–0	4th
1992–93	UEFA Champions League	Group A	(Belgium) Club Brugge	1–2	0–1	4th
1994–95	UEFA Cup Winners' Cup	First round	(Hungary) Ferencváros	2–1	1–2	3–3 (6–7 p)
1996–97	UEFA Cup	Qualifying round	(Iceland) ÍA	4–1	2–0	6–1
1996–97	UEFA Cup	First round	(Netherlands) Feyenoord	0–1	1–1	1–2
1999–2000	UEFA Champions League	Second Qualifying Round	(Norway) Molde	2–0	0–4	2–4
2000–01	UEFA Cup	First round	(Denmark) Viborg	0–0	0–1	0–1
2002–03	UEFA Cup	First round	(Italy) Parma	1–1	2–3	3–4
2003–04	UEFA Champions League	Second Qualifying Round	(North Macedonia) Vardar	1–2	1–1	2–3
2004–05	UEFA Champions League	Second Qualifying Round	(Azerbaijan) Neftçi Baku	2–0	0–0	2–0
2004–05	UEFA Champions League	Third Qualifying Round	(Scotland) Rangers	2–1	1–1	3–2
2004–05	UEFA Champions League	Group H	(Portugal) Porto	0–1	0–0	3rd
2004–05	UEFA Champions League	Group H	(France) Paris Saint-Germain	2–0	3–1	3rd
2004–05	UEFA Champions League	Group H	(England) Chelsea	0–1	0–2	3rd
2004–05	UEFA Cup	Round of 32	(Portugal) Benfica	2–0	1–1	3–1
2004–05	UEFA Cup	Round of 16	(Serbia and Montenegro) Partizan	2–0	1–1	3–1
2004–05	UEFA Cup	Quarter-final	(France) Auxerre	3–0	0–0	3–0
2004–05	UEFA Cup	Semi-final	(Italy) Parma	3–1	1–2	4–3
2004–05	UEFA Cup	Final	(Portugal) Sporting CP	3–1		
2005–06	UEFA Super Cup	Final	(England) Liverpool	1–3		
2005–06	UEFA Cup	First round	(Denmark) Midtjylland	3–1	3–1	6–2
2005–06	UEFA Cup	Group F	(France) Marseille	1–2	—N/a	4th
2005–06	UEFA Cup	Group F	(Bulgaria) Levski Sofia	2–1	—N/a	4th
2005–06	UEFA Cup	Group F	(Netherlands) Heerenveen	—N/a	0–0	4th
2005–06	UEFA Cup	Group F	(Romania) Dinamo București	—N/a	0–1	4th
2006–07	UEFA Champions League	Third Qualifying Round	(Slovakia) Ružomberok	3–0	2–0	5–0
2006–07	UEFA Champions League	Group G	(Portugal) Porto	0–2	0–0	3rd
2006–07	UEFA Champions League	Group G	(Germany) Hamburger SV	1–0	2–3	3rd
2006–07	UEFA Champions League	Group G	(England) Arsenal	1–0	0–0	3rd
2006–07	UEFA Cup	Round of 32	(Israel) Maccabi Haifa	0–0	0–1	0–1
2007–08	UEFA Champions League	Group G	(Netherlands) PSV Eindhoven	0–1	1–2	4th
2007–08	UEFA Champions League	Group G	(Turkey) Fenerbahçe	2–2	1–3	4th
2007–08	UEFA Champions League	Group G	(Italy) Inter Milan	1–2	2–4	4th
2008–09	UEFA Cup	First round	(Croatia) Slaven Koprivnica	1–0	2–1	3–1
2008–09	UEFA Cup	Group F	(Spain) Deportivo La Coruña	3–0	—N/a	1st
2008–09	UEFA Cup	Group F	(Netherlands) Feyenoord	—N/a	3–1	1st
2008–09	UEFA Cup	Group F	(Poland) Lech Poznań	2–1	—N/a	1st
2008–09	UEFA Cup	Group F	(France) Nancy	—N/a	4–3	1st
2008–09	UEFA Cup	Round of 32	(England) Aston Villa	2–0	1–1	3–1
2008–09	UEFA Cup	Round of 16	(Ukraine) Shakhtar Donetsk	1–0	0–2	1–2
2009–10	UEFA Champions League	Group B	(Germany) VfL Wolfsburg	2–1	1–3	2nd
2009–10	UEFA Champions League	Group B	(Turkey) Beşiktaş	2–1	2–1	2nd
2009–10	UEFA Champions League	Group B	(England) Manchester United	0–1	3–3	2nd
2009–10	UEFA Champions League	Round of 16	(Spain) Sevilla	1–1	2–1	3–2
2009–10	UEFA Champions League	Quarter-final	(Italy) Inter Milan	0–1	0–1	0–2
2010–11	UEFA Europa League	Play-off Round	(Cyprus) Anorthosis Famagusta	4–0	2–1	6–1
2010–11	UEFA Europa League	Group F	(Switzerland) Lausanne-Sport	5–1	3–0	1st
2010–11	UEFA Europa League	Group F	(Czech Republic) Sparta Prague	3–0	1–1	1st
2010–11	UEFA Europa League	Group F	(Italy) Palermo	3–1	3–0	1st
2010–11	UEFA Europa League	Round of 32	(Greece) PAOK	1–1	1–0	2–1
2010–11	UEFA Europa League	Round of 16	(Portugal) Porto	0–1	1–2	1–3
2011–12	UEFA Champions League	Group B	(France) Lille	0–2	2–2	2nd
2011–12	UEFA Champions League	Group B	(Italy) Inter Milan	2–3	2–1	2nd
2011–12	UEFA Champions League	Group B	(Turkey) Trabzonspor	3–0	0–0	2nd
2011–12	UEFA Champions League	Round of 16	(Spain) Real Madrid	1–1	1–4	2–5
2012–13	UEFA Europa League	Play-off round	(Sweden) AIK	1–0	0–2	1–2
2013–14	UEFA Champions League	Group D	(Germany) Bayern Munich	1–3	0–3	4th
2013–14	UEFA Champions League	Group D	(England) Manchester City	1–2	2–5	4th
2013–14	UEFA Champions League	Group D	(Czech Republic) Viktoria Plzeň	3–2	1–2	4th
2014–15	UEFA Champions League	Group E	(Germany) Bayern Munich	0–1	0–3	4th
2014–15	UEFA Champions League	Group E	(England) Manchester City	2–2	2–1	4th
2014–15	UEFA Champions League	Group E	(Italy) Roma	1–1	1–5	4th
2015–16	UEFA Champions League	Third Qualifying Round	(Czech Republic) Sparta Prague	2–2	3–2	5–4
2015–16	UEFA Champions League	Play-off Round	(Portugal) Sporting CP	3–1	1–2	4–3
2015–16	UEFA Champions League	Group B	(Germany) VfL Wolfsburg	0–2	0–1	4th
2015–16	UEFA Champions League	Group B	(Netherlands) PSV Eindhoven	3–2	1–2	4th
2015–16	UEFA Champions League	Group B	(England) Manchester United	1–1	0–1	4th
2016–17	UEFA Champions League	Group E	(France) Monaco	1–1	0–3	4th
2016–17	UEFA Champions League	Group E	(Germany) Bayer Leverkusen	1–1	2–2	4th
2016–17	UEFA Champions League	Group E	(England) Tottenham Hotspur	0–1	1–3	4th
2017–18	UEFA Champions League	Third Qualifying Round	(Greece) AEK Athens	1–0	2–0	3–0
2017–18	UEFA Champions League	Play-off Round	(Switzerland) Young Boys	1–0	2–0	3–0
2017–18	UEFA Champions League	Group A	(Portugal) Benfica	2–0	2–1	3rd
2017–18	UEFA Champions League	Group A	(England) Manchester United	1–4	1–2	3rd
2017–18	UEFA Champions League	Group A	(Switzerland) Basel	0–2	2–1	3rd
2017–18	UEFA Europa League	Round of 32	(Serbia) Red Star Belgrade	1–0	0–0	1–0
2017–18	UEFA Europa League	Round of 16	(France) Lyon	0–1	3–2	3–3 (a)
2017–18	UEFA Europa League	Quarter-final	(England) Arsenal	2–2	1–4	3–6
2018–19	UEFA Champions League	Group G	(Spain) Real Madrid	1–0	3–0	4th
2018–19	UEFA Champions League	Group G	(Italy) Roma	1–2	0–3	4th
2018–19	UEFA Champions League	Group G	(Czech Republic) Viktoria Plzeň	1–2	2–2	4th
2019–20	UEFA Europa League	Group H	(Bulgaria) Ludogorets Razgrad	1–1	1–5	4th
2019–20	UEFA Europa League	Group H	(Spain) Espanyol	0–2	1–0	4th
2019–20	UEFA Europa League	Group H	(Hungary) Ferencváros	0–1	0–0	4th
2020–21	UEFA Europa League	Group K	(Croatia) Dinamo Zagreb	0–0	1–3	4th
2020–21	UEFA Europa League	Group K	(Netherlands) Feyenoord	0–0	1–3	4th
2020–21	UEFA Europa League	Group K	(Austria) Wolfsberg	0–1	1–1	4th

== Result by team ==
As of match played 10 December 2020

Opponents	Played	Won	Drawn*	Lost	GF	GA	GD	% Won
(Austria) Sturm Graz	2	1	0	1	2	2	0	50
(Austria) Wolfsberg	2	0	1	1	1	2	−1	0
(Azerbaijan) Neftçi Baku	2	1	1	0	2	0	+2	50
(Belgium) Club Brugge	2	0	0	2	1	3	–2	0
(Belgium) Standard Liège	2	1	0	1	1	2	–1	50
(Bulgaria) Levski Sofia	1	1	0	0	2	1	+1	100
(Bulgaria) Ludogorets Razgrad	2	0	1	1	2	6	–4	0
(Croatia) Dinamo Zagreb	2	0	1	1	1	3	−2	0
(Croatia) Slaven Koprivnica	2	2	0	0	3	1	+2	100
(Cyprus) Anorthosis Famagusta	2	2	0	0	6	1	+5	100
(Czech Republic) Sparta Prague	4	2	2	0	9	5	+4	50
(Czech Republic) Viktoria Plzeň	3	1	1	1	6	6	0	33.33
(Denmark) Midtjylland	2	2	0	0	6	2	+4	100
(Denmark) Viborg	2	0	1	1	0	1	–1	0
(England) Arsenal	4	1	2	1	4	6	–2	25
(England) Aston Villa	2	1	1	0	3	1	+2	50
(England) Chelsea	2	0	0	2	0	3	–3	0
(England) Liverpool	1	0	0	1	1	3	–2	0
(England) Manchester City	4	1	1	2	7	10	–3	25
(England) Manchester United	6	0	2	4	6	12	–6	0
(England) Tottenham Hotspur	2	0	0	2	1	4	–3	0
(France) Auxerre	2	1	1	0	3	0	+3	50
(France) Lille	2	0	1	1	2	4	–2	0
(France) Marseille	3	0	1	2	2	9	–7	0
(France) Monaco	2	0	1	1	1	4	–3	0
(France) Nancy	1	1	0	0	4	3	+1	100
(France) Lyon	2	1	0	1	3	3	0	50
(France) Paris Saint-Germain	2	2	0	0	5	1	+4	100
(Germany) Bayer Leverkusen	2	0	2	0	3	3	0	0
(Germany) Bayern Munich	4	0	0	4	1	10	–9	0
(Germany) Hamburger SV	2	1	0	1	3	3	0	50
(Germany) VfL Wolfsburg	4	1	0	3	3	7	–4	25
(Greece) AEK Athens	2	2	0	0	3	0	+3	100
(Greece) PAOK	2	1	1	0	2	1	+1	50
(Hungary) Ferencváros	4	1	1	2	3	4	–1	25
(Iceland) ÍA	2	2	0	0	6	1	+5	100
(Iceland) Vikingur Reykjavik	2	2	0	0	5	2	+3	100
(Israel) Maccabi Haifa	2	0	1	1	0	1	–1	0
(Italy) Inter Milan	6	1	0	5	7	12	–5	16.67
(Italy) Parma	4	1	1	2	7	7	0	25
(Italy) Palermo	2	2	0	0	6	1	+5	100
(Italy) Roma	6	1	1	4	5	13	–8	16.67
(North Macedonia) Vardar	2	0	1	1	2	3	–1	0
(Netherlands) Heerenveen	1	0	1	0	0	0	0	0
(Netherlands) Feyenoord	5	1	2	2	5	6	−1	20
(Netherlands) PSV Eindhoven	4	1	0	3	5	7	–2	25
(Norway) Molde	2	1	0	1	2	4	–2	50
(Poland) Lech Poznań	1	1	0	0	2	1	+1	100
(Portugal) Benfica	4	3	1	0	7	2	+5	75
(Portugal) Porto	6	0	2	4	1	6	–5	0
(Portugal) Sporting CP	3	2	0	1	7	4	+3	66.67
(Romania) Dinamo București	1	0	0	1	0	1	–1	0
(Scotland) Rangers	4	1	2	1	3	3	0	25
(Serbia and Montenegro) Partizan	2	1	1	0	3	1	+2	50
(Serbia) Red Star Belgrade	2	1	1	0	1	0	+1	50
(Slovakia) MFK Ružomberok	2	2	0	0	5	0	+5	100
(Spain) Barcelona	2	1	1	0	4	3	+1	50
(Spain) Deportivo La Coruña	1	1	0	0	3	0	+3	100
(Spain) Espanyol	2	1	0	1	1	2	–1	50
(Spain) Real Madrid	3	1	1	1	3	5	–2	33.33
(Spain) Sevilla	2	1	1	0	3	2	+1	50
(Sweden) AIK	2	1	0	1	1	2	–1	50
(Switzerland) Basel	2	1	0	1	2	3	–1	50
(Switzerland) Lausanne-Sport	2	2	0	0	8	1	+7	100
(Switzerland) Young Boys	2	2	0	0	3	0	+3	100
(Turkey) Beşiktaş	2	2	0	0	4	2	+2	100
(Turkey) Fenerbahçe	2	0	1	1	3	5	–2	0
(Turkey) Galatasaray	2	1	1	0	4	1	+3	50
(Turkey) Trabzonspor	2	1	1	0	3	0	+3	50
(Ukraine) Shakhtar Donetsk	2	1	0	1	1	2	–1	50
Total	175	66	42	67	224	225	−1	37.71

== UEFA Coefficient Rankings ==
=== UEFA club coefficient ranking ===
As of 21 September 2023. Source: UEFA Coefficients

Rank	Team	Points
183	(Denmark) Randers	7.000
184	(Cyprus) Anorthosis	7.000
185	(Russia) CSKA Moscow	7.000
186	(Turkey) Adana Demirspor	2.500
187	(Turkey) Konyaspor	2.000

=== Football Club Elo ranking ===
As of 14 June 2023

Rank	Team	Points
132	(England) Coventry City	1570
133	(Germany) Hertha Berlin	1570
134	(Russia) CSKA Moscow	1570
135	(France) Toulouse	1569
136	(Germany) Heidenheim	1568
