= João Morais =

Portuguese footballer (1935–2010)

Personal information
- Full name: João Pedro Morais
- Date of birth: 6 March 1935
- Place of birth: Cascais, Portugal
- Date of death: 27 April 2010 (aged 75)
- Place of death: Vila do Conde, Portugal
- Height: 1.69 m (5 ft 7 in)
- Positions: Full-back; winger

Youth career
- 1948–1951: Sporting Alcabideche
- 1951–1954: Estoril

Senior career*
Years	Team	Apps	(Gls)
1954–1955	Caldas		
1955–1958	Torreense	41	(18)
1958–1969	Sporting CP	192	(50)
1970–1972	Rio Ave		
1972–1973	Paços Ferreira		

International career
1966–1967	Portugal	9	(0)
Medal record
Men's football
Representing Portugal
FIFA World Cup
Third place	1966 England
- * Club domestic league appearances and goals

João Pedro Morais (6 March 1935 – 27 April 2010) was a Portuguese footballer. He started playing as a winger and later became a full-back.

== Club career ==
Born in Cascais, Morais joined Sporting CP in 1958, arriving from S.C.U. Torreense where he had made his Primeira Liga debut. He spent the following 11 seasons with the Lisbon club, appearing in 256 matches in all competitions – including friendlies – and scoring 68 goals.

Morais was essential as Sporting won the 1964 edition of the UEFA Cup Winners' Cup: in the final's replay (3–3 in the first match), he scored from a direct corner kick in a 1–0 win against MTK Budapest FC.

Morais left the Lions in June 1969, having won four titles. He retired at the age of 38, after three years in amateur football with Rio Ave F.C. and F.C. Paços de Ferreira.

== International career ==
Morais earned nine caps for Portugal in one year. His debut was on 18 June 1966 in a 1–0 friendly victory over Scotland, in Glasgow.

Morais was selected for the country's 1966 FIFA World Cup squad, appearing in three games in a third-place finish. In the last group-stage fixture against Brazil, he committed one of the most infamous World Cup fouls on Brazilian legend Pelé; however, he was allowed to stay on the field by English referee George McCabe.

== Later life and death ==
Morais settled in Vila do Conde, the city of his penultimate club, after retiring, going on to work as a city hall employee. He died on 27 April 2010 at 75 after a long battle with illness.

== Honours ==
Sporting CP

- Primeira Liga: 1961–62, 1965–66
- Taça de Portugal: 1962–63
- UEFA Cup Winners' Cup: 1963–64

Portugal

- FIFA World Cup third place: 1966
