= List of Sporting CP players =

This is a list of notable footballers who have played for Sporting Clube de Portugal. Generally, this means players that have played a significant number of first-class matches for the club. Other players who have played an important role for the club can be included, but the reason why they have been included should be added in the 'Notes' column.

For a list of all Sporting CP players, major or minor, with a Wikipedia article, see Category:Sporting CP players, and for the current squad see the main Sporting CP article.

Players are listed according to the date of their first team debut. Appearances and goals are for first-team competitive matches only; wartime matches are excluded. Substitute appearances included.

== Table ==
Name	Nationality	Position	Sporting career	Appearances	Goals	Notes
Francisco dos Santos	(Portugal)	MF	1908-1911	4	0	
Francisco Stromp	(Portugal)	FW	1908-1924	43	13	
Jaime Gonçalves	(Portugal)	FW	1914-1927	58	30	
Torres Pereira	(Portugal)	FW	1916-1927	62	8	
João Maia	(Portugal)	FW	1917-1929	78	26	
Jorge Viera	(Portugal)	DF	1920-1930	109	0	1928 Summer Olympics participant
Henrique Portela	(Portugal)	MF	1920-1929	35	1	
Serra e Moura	(Portugal)	MF	1924-1930	74	10	
José Martins	(Portugal)	FW	1925-1929	46	31	1928 Summer Olympics participant
Artur Dyson	(Portugal)	GK	1930-1936	62	0	
Alfredo Valadas	(Portugal)	FW	1931-1933	11	4	
Rui Araújo	(Portugal)	MF	1932-1939	105	3	
Manuel Soeiro	(Portugal)	FW	1933-1945	104	99	
Rudolf Jeny	(Hungary)	FW	1933-1934	25	6	
Manuel Marques	(Portugal)	MF	1935-1951	219	4	
João Azevedo	(Portugal)	GK	1935-1953	424	0	
Joaquim Alcobia	(Portugal)	MF	1935-1936	12	0	
Wilhelm Possak	(Romania)	FW	1935-1937	15	7	
Mário Galvão	(Portugal)	DF	1935-1940	0	0	
Aníbal Paciência	(Portugal)	MF	1936-1937 19431944	180	8	
João Cruz	(Portugal)	FW	1936-1947	278	144	
Fernando Peyroteo	(Portugal) / (Angola)	FW	1937-1949	197	332	
Carlos Canário	(Portugal)	MF	1938-1952	197	26	
Álvaro Cardoso	(Portugal)	MF	1938-1948	148	1	
Georges Demulder	(Belgium)	FW	1940-1941	14	8	
Jesus Correia	(Portugal)	LW	1943-1953	157	127	
Albano	(Portugal)	FW	1943-1956	335	162	
José Travassos	(Portugal)	LW	1946-1959	321	129	13 August 1955; Windsor Park, Belfast: Great Britain 1–4 Rest of Europe participant
Manuel Vasques	(Portugal)	FW	1946-1959	278	190	
João Martins	(Portugal)	FW	1946-1959	204	131	
Mário Wilson	(Portugal) / (Mozambique)	DF	1949-1951	36	37	
Juca	(Portugal) / (Mozambique)	MF	1949-1958	179	9	
Carlos Gomes	(Portugal)	GK	1950-1958	178	0	
José Rita	(Portugal)	GK	1952-1955	0	0	
Iosif Fabian	(Romania) / (Portugal)	FW	1953-1954	6	2	
János Hrotkó	(Hungary)	FW	1953-1955	35	5	
Octávio de Sá	(Mozambique)	GK	1954-1960	76	0	
Léon Mokuna	(Democratic Republic of the Congo)	FW	1954-1957	13	19	
José Pérides	(Portugal)	MF	1955-1960 1961–1964	131	9	
António Morato	(Portugal)	DF	1956-1963/1964-1965	160	1	
Fernando Mendes	(Portugal)	MF	1956-1968	225	2	
David Júlio	(Portugal) / (South Africa)	MF	1957-1964	145	9	
Mário Lino	(Portugal)	DF	1958-1967	127	4	
João Morais	(Portugal)	MF	1958-1969	192	50	1966 FIFA World Cup participant
Joaquim Carvalho	(Portugal)	GK	1958-1970	244	0	
Hilário	(Portugal) / (Mozambique)	DF	1958-1973	471	0	1966 FIFA World Cup participant
Bé	(Brazil)	FW	1958-1961	7	0	
Juan Seminario	(Peru)	FW	1959-1961	40	17	
Jose Ferdinando Puglia	(Brazil)	MF	1959-1961	57	58	
Ernesto Figueiredo	(Portugal)	FW	1960-1968	232	148	
Alexandre Baptista	(Portugal)	DF	1960-1971	94	2	1966 FIFA World Cup participant
Mascarenhas	(Portugal) / (Angola)	FW	1962-1965	25	12	
José Carlos	(Portugal)	DF	1962-1974	248	3	1966 FIFA World Cup participant
Osvaldo da Silva	(Brazil)	MF	1962-1966	74	27	
Barroca	(Portugal)	GK	1963-1970	19	0	
Alfredo Moreira	(Portugal)	DF	1963-1967	45	0	
João Lourenço	(Portugal)	FW	1964-1972	219	145	
Jean-Pierre Serra	(France)	FW	1964-1965	25	12	
Armando Manhiça	(Portugal)	DF	1964-1970	86	0	
Fernando Peres	(Portugal)	MF	1965-1968/1969-1972	200	65	Brazil Independence Cup participant
Francisco Caló	(Portugal)	DF	1965-1972	74	1	
Vítor Damas	(Portugal)	GK	1966-1976/1984-1989	332	0	
Manaca	(Mozambique) / (Portugal)	DF	1966-1968 1969–1975 1977–1978	201	6	
Marinho	(Portugal)	FW	1967-1977	237	70	
Chico Faria	(Portugal)	FW	1968-1976	168	43	
Pedras	(Portugal)	MF	1968-1971	41	9	
Joaquim Dinis	(Portugal) / (Angola)	LW	1969-1975	151	27	Brazil Independence Cup participant
Nélson Fernandes	(Portugal)	MF	1969-1976	195	70	
Fernando Tomé	(Portugal)	MF	1970-1976	97	10	
João Laranjeira	(Portugal)	DF	1970-1979	151	2	
António Botelho	(Portugal)	GK	1970-1974 197–1979	58	0	
Héctor Yazalde	(Argentina)	FW	1971-1975	104	104	1974 FIFA World Cup participant
Wágner	(Brazil)	MF	1971-1975	85	9	
Jorge Jesus	(Portugal)	MF	1973-1976	12	1	
Baltasar Gonçalves	(Portugal)	FW	1973-1979	103	8	
Paulo Rocha	(Portugal)	MF	1973-1976	28	0	
Dé Aranha	(Brazil)	FW	1973-1975	13	5	
Augusto Inácio	(Portugal)	DF	1974-1982	157	5	
Rui Palhares	(Portugal)	MF	1974-1977	15	0	
Valter Costa	(Portugal)	MF	1974-1977	50	0	
Manuel Fernandes	(Portugal)	FW	1975-1987	326	189	
Amândio Barreiras	(Portugal)	DF	1975-1977	14	0	
Virgílio	(Portugal)	MF	1976-1978/1981-1988	142	10	
Salif Keïta	(Mali)	FW	1976-1979	83	32	
Carlos Freire	(Portugal)	LW	1976-1983	101	11	
Francisco Barão	(Portugal)	DF	1976-1983	114	1	
Conhé	(Portugal)	GK	1976-1977	20	0	
Manoel	(Brazil)	FW	1976-1981	117	42	
Rui Jordão	(Portugal)	FW	1977-1979 1979–1987	207	140	UEFA Euro 1984 participant
Joaquim Murça	(Portugal)	DF	1977-1979	10	0	
Artur Correia	(Portugal)	DF	1977-1979 1979–1980	63	0	
Eurico Gomes	(Portugal)	DF	1979-1982	89	2	
Lito	(Portugal)	MF	1979-1985	113	17	
Carlos Xavier	(Portugal)	MF	1980-1991/1994-1996	230	13	
Peta Bala'c	(England)	GK/MF	1980	15	0	
António Oliveira	(Portugal)	MF	1981-1985	67	27	
Ferenc Mészáros	(Hungary)	GK	1981-1983	57	0	
Joaquim Melo	(Portugal)	GK	1981-1984	9	0	
Pedro Venâncio	(Portugal)	DF	1982-1992	209	9	
Fernando Festas	(Portugal)	DF	1982-1984	26	0	
Vanio Kostov	(Bulgaria)	MF	1982-1985	49	4	
Vjeran Simunić	(Croatia)	GK	1983-1983	0	0	
Paulo Futre	(Portugal)	LW	1983-1984	21	3	
Béla Katzirz	(Hungary)	GK	1983-1986	30	0	
Rodger Wylde	(England)	FW	1983-1984	9	1	
António Morato	(Portugal)	DF	1983-1989	140	4	
Romeu Silva	(Portugal)	MF	1983-1986	41	3	
António Sousa	(Portugal)	MF	1984-1986	54	13	1986 FIFA World Cup participant
Jaime Pacheco	(Portugal)	MF	1984-1986	39	2	1986 FIFA World Cup participant
José Forbs	(Guinea-Bissau)	FW	1984-1986 1988–1989	29	4	
Litos	(Portugal)	MF	1984-1992	150	10	
Oceano	(Portugal)	MF	1984-1991/1994-1998	308	39	UEFA Euro 1996 participant
Fernando Mendes	(Portugal)	DF	1985-1989	91	1	
Raphael Meade	(England)	FW	1985-1988	40	24	
José Lima	(Portugal)	FW	1985-1992	62	6	
Manuel Negrete	(Mexico)	FW	1986	15	3	
Rob McDonald	(England)	FW/MF	1986	6	1	
Zinho	(Brazil)	MF	1986-1987	22	2	
Silvinho	(Brazil)	MF	1986-1988	48	7	
Rui Correia	(Portugal)	GK	1986-1988	15	0	
Frank Rijkaard	(Netherlands)	MF	1987-1988	0	0	
Paulinho Cascavel	(Brazil)	FW	1987-1990	94	38	
Marlon Brandão	(Brazil)	FW	1987-1990	55	8	
Tony Sealy	(England)	FW	1987-1988	29	9	
Peter Houtman	(Netherlands)	FW	1987-1988	19	3	
Jorge Cadete	(Portugal)	FW	1987-1995	164	62	
Amadou Pathé Diallo	(Mali)	MF	1987-1988	58	4	
Ricardo Rocha	(Brazil)	DF	1988	10	1	
Rodolfo Rodríguez	(Uruguay)	GK	1988-1989	16	0	
Hans Eskilsson	(Sweden)	FW/DF	1988-1989	7	1	
Ali Hassan	(Mozambique)	MF	1988-1991	22	0	
Paulo Silas	(Brazil)	MF	1988-1990	47	11	1989 Copa América participant
Carlos Manuel	(Portugal)	MF	1988-1990	48	4	
Jorge Amaral	(Portugal)	MF	1988-1994	29	0	
Luizinho	(Brazil)	DF	1989-1992	82	3	
Fernando Gomes	(Portugal)	FW	1989-1991	63	31	
Tomislav Ivković	(Socialist Federal Republic of Yugoslavia)	GK	1989-1993	133	0	1990 FIFA World Cup participant
Paulo Torres	(Portugal)	DF	1989-1995	65	7	1991 FIFA World Youth Championship and 1994 UEFA European Under-21 Football Championship participant
Luís Figo	(Portugal)	RW	1989-1995	137	16	1991 FIFA World Youth Championship and 1994 UEFA European Under-21 Football Championship participant
Douglas	(Brazil)	MF	1989-1991	124	14	
José Leal	(Portugal)	DF	1989-1994	118	12	
Pedro Dias	(Portugal)	FW	1989-1992	0	0	
Vlado Bozinovski	(Australia)	MF	1990-1991	11	0	
João Oliveira Pinto	(Portugal)	MF	1990-1992	0	0	
Nélson	(Portugal)	DF	1991-1996	115	3	1994 UEFA European Under-21 Football Championship participant
Emílio Peixe	(Portugal)	MF	1991–1995; 1996–1997	124	3	1991 FIFA World Youth Championship, 1996 UEFA European Under-21 Football Championship and 1996 Summer Olympics participant
Krasimir Balakov	(Bulgaria)	MF	1991-1995	138	43	1994 FIFA World Cup participant
Boncho Genchev	(Bulgaria)	MF	1991-1992	2	0	
Ivaylo Yordanov	(Bulgaria)	FW	1991-2001	183	55	1994 FIFA World Cup, UEFA Euro 1996 and 1998 FIFA World Cup participant
Fernando Nélson	(Portugal)	DF	1991-1996	115	2	
Serhiy Scherbakov	(Ukraine)	MF	1992-1993	25	5	
Stan Valckx	(Netherlands)	DF	1992-1994	69	5	1994 FIFA World Cup participant
Nuno Capucho	(Portugal)	RW	1992-1995	65	10	1994 UEFA European Under-21 Football Championship participant
Andrzej Juskowiak	(Poland)	FW	1992-1995	74	25	
Hugo Porfírio	(Portugal)	LW	1992-1997	12	0	
Pedro Barny	(Portugal)	DF	1992-1993	30	0	
Poejo	(Portugal)	MF	1992-1996	13	0	
Luís Bilro	(Portugal)	DF	1992-1993	0	0	
Paulo Sousa	(Portugal)	MF	1993-1994	31	2	
António Pacheco	(Portugal)	FW	1993-1995	22	2	
Budimir Vujačić	(Socialist Federal Republic of Yugoslavia)	DF	1993-1997	62	7	
Costinha	(Portugal)	GK	1993-1997	76	0	1996 Summer Olympics, 1994 UEFA European Under-21 Football Championship and 1996 UEFA European Under-21 Football Championship participant
Anselmo Ribeiro	(Cape Verde)	MF/FW	1993-1996	0	0	
Zoran Lemajić	(Montenegro)	GK	1993-1995	24	0	
Dani	(Portugal)	MF	1994-1996	10	0	1995 FIFA World Youth Championship participant
Emmanuel Amuneke	(Nigeria)	LW	1994-1996	51	17	1994 FIFA World Cup, 1994 Africa Cup of Nations and 1996 Summer Olympics participant
Noureddine Naybet	(Morocco)	DF	1994-1996	64	5	
Nuno Valente	(Portugal)	DF	1994-1999	36	1	
Marco Aurélio	(Brazil)	DF	1994-1999	134	3	
Beto	(Portugal)	DF	1994-2006	241	21	1995 FIFA World Youth Championship, 1996 Summer Olympics, UEFA Euro 2000 and 2002 FIFA World Cup participant
Chiquinho Conde	(Mozambique)	FW	1994-1995	27	3	
Ricardo Sá Pinto	(Portugal)	FW	1994-1997/2000-2006	174	34	UEFA Euro 1996 participant
Marco Aurélio	(Brazil)	DF	1994-1999	134	3	
José Dominguez	(Portugal)	LW	1995-1997	62	4	1993 FIFA World Youth Championship, 1996 UEFA European Under-21 Football Championship and 1996 Summer Olympics participant
Paulo Alves	(Portugal)	FW	1995-1998	68	22	1996 Summer Olympics participant
Luís Vidigal	(Portugal)	MF	1995-2000	110	5	1996 UEFA European Under-21 Football Championship, 1996 Summer Olympics and UEFA Euro 2000 participant
Luís Miguel	(Mozambique)	DF	1995-1998	41	0	
Afonso Martins	(Portugal)	MF	1995-2002	65	5	1996 UEFA European Under-21 Football Championship and 1996 Summer Olympics participant
Pedro Barbosa	(Portugal)	MF	1995-2005	259	41	UEFA Euro 1996 participant
Tomáš Skuhravý	(Czech Republic)	FW	1995-1996	4	0	
Tiago	(Portugal)	GK	1995-2012	85	0	
Ahmed Ouattara	(Ivory Coast)	FW	1995-1997	20	5	
Dani	(Portugal)	MF	1995-1996	9	0	
Assis	(Brazil)	MF	1995-1996 1998	8	2	
Tiago Ferreira	(Portugal)	GK	1995-2012	85	0	
Mustapha Hadji	(Morocco)	MF	1996-1997	27	3	
Jean-Jacques Missé-Missé	(Cameroon)	FW	1996-1997	4	0	
Filip De Wilde	(Belgium)	GK	1996-1998	50	0	
Andrija Balajić	(Croatia)	DF	1996-1997	3	0	
Marco Caneira	(Portugal)	DF	1996-2000/2006-2007/2008-2011	69	1	
Nuno Assis	(Portugal)	MF	1996-2001	0	0	
Carlos Fernandes	(Portugal)	DF	1996-1999	2	0	
Luís Boa Morte	(Portugal)	MF	1996-1997	0	0	
Gil Baiano	(Brazil)	DF	1996-1997	22	0	
César Ramírez	(Paraguay)	FW	1997-1998	29	2	1997 FIFA World Youth Championship and 1998 FIFA World Cup participant
Simão Sabrosa	(Portugal)	LW	1997-1999	53	12	1999 FIFA World Youth Championship participant
Abdelilah Saber	(Morocco)	DF	1997-2001	61	0	1998 FIFA World Cup participant
Nélson Pereira	(Portugal)	GK	1997-2006	66	0	
Quim Berto	(Portugal)	DF	1997-2001	48	3	
Nuno Santos	(Portugal)	GK	1997-2005	1	0	
Nenê	(Brazil)	DF	1997-1998	4	0	
Didier Lang	(France)	DF	1997-1998	24	2	
Leandro Machado	(Brazil)	FW	1997-1999	35	12	
Gabriel Heinze	(Argentina)	DF	1998-1999	5	1	
Aldo Duscher	(Argentina)	MF	1998-2000	55	6	1999 FIFA World Youth Championship participant
Edmílson	(Brazil)	FW/MF	1998-2000	66	19	
Delfim	(Portugal)	MF	1998-2001	58	7	
Facundo Quiroga	(Argentina)	DF	1998-2004	73	2	
Petar Krpan	(Croatia)	FW	1998-1999	29	3	
Alberto Acosta	(Argentina)	FW	1998-2001	78	39	
Julián Kmet	(Argentina)	MF	1998-2000	1	0	
Rui Jorge	(Portugal)	DF	1998-2005	192	5	UEFA Euro 2000, 2002 FIFA World Cup and UEFA Euro 2004 participant
Ivo Damas	(Portugal)	MF	1998-2002	8	0	
Vasco Faísca	(Portugal)	DF	1998-2000	0	0	
Bino	(Portugal)	MF	1998-2001	41	2	
Alhandra	(Portugal)	DF	1998-1999	0	0	
Bruno Marioni	(Argentina)	FW	1998-1999	16	1	
Leão	(Portugal)	MF	1998	2	0	
Ivone De Franceschi	(Italy)	LW	1999-2000	25	3	
Kwame Ayew	(Ghana)	FW	1999-2000	26	7	
Peter Schmeichel	(Denmark)	GK	1999-2001	55	0	UEFA Euro 2000 participant
Mauricio Hanuch	(Argentina)	MF	1999-2003	12	0	
André Cruz	(Brazil)	DF	1999-2002	78	9	
Toñito	(Spain)	MF	1999-2004	87	9	
Marcos	(Brazil)	DF	1999-2000	5	0	
Juan Francisco Viveros	(Chile)	FW	1999-2001	3	0	
Santamaria	(Portugal)	DF	1999-2006	3	0	
Carlos Fumo	(Mozambique)	MF	1999-2003	0	0	
Antonio Robaina	(Spain)	MF	1999-2000	3	0	
Rodrigo Fabri	(Brazil)	MF	2000-2001	23	3	
Mbo Mpenza	(Belgium)	FW	2000-2001	35	3	UEFA Euro 2000 participant
Phil Babb	(Republic of Ireland)	DF	2000-2002	37	0	
César Prates	(Brazil)	DF	2000-2003	84	2	
João Pinto	(Portugal)	FW	2000-2004	115	28	2002 FIFA World Cup participant
Pavel Horváth	(Czech Republic)	MF	2000-2001	19	1	
Jovan Kirovski	(United States)	FW	2000-2001	5	0	
Alan Mahon	(Republic of Ireland)	MF	2000-2001	1	0	
Paulo Bento	(Portugal)	MF	2000-2004	92	2	2002 FIFA World Cup participant
Robert Špehar	(Croatia)	FW	2000-2001	11	5	
Dimas	(Portugal)	DF	2000-2002	10	2	
Carlos Martins	(Portugal)	MF	2000-2007	76	9	
Hugo Viana	(Portugal)	MF	2001-2002/2004-2005	58	7	2002 UEFA European Under-21 Football Championship and Men's Football at the 2004 Summer Olympics participant
Mário Jardel	(Brazil)	FW	2001-2003	49	53	
Ricardo Quaresma	(Portugal)	RW	2001-2003	59	8	
Cristiano Ronaldo	(Portugal)	LW	2001-2003	25	3	
Rui Bento	(Portugal)	MF	2001-2004	55	1	
Marius Niculae	(Romania)	FW	2001-2005	59	14	
Custódio	(Portugal)	MF	2001-2007	95	4	2004 UEFA European Under-21 Football Championship and 2006 UEFA European Under-21 Football Championship participant
Rodrigo Tello	(Chile)	MF	2001-2007	113	8	2000 Summer Olympics and 2010 FIFA World Cup participant
Mario Cáceres	(Chile)	FW	2001	1	0	
Luís Filipe	(Portugal)	DF	2001-2004	18	0	
Diogo Matos	(Portugal)	MF	2001-2004	4	0	
Pablo Contreras	(Chile)	DF	2002-2003	30	2	2000 Summer Olympics and 2010 FIFA World Cup participant
Dimitris Nalitzis	(Greece)	FW	2002	11	0	
Danny	(Portugal) / (Venezuela)	LW	2002-2005	10	0	2004 UEFA European Under-21 Football Championship and Men's Football at the 2004 Summer Olympics participant
Vitali Kutuzov	(Belarus)	FW	2002-2003	23	3	
Custódio Castro	(Portugal)	MF	2002-2007	95	4	
Jorge Vidigal	(Angola)	DF	2002	1	0	
Fábio Rochemback	(Brazil)	MF	2003–2005; 2008–2009	66	11	
Ricardo	(Portugal)	GK	2003-2007	125	0	UEFA Euro 2004 and 2006 FIFA World Cup participant.
Liédson	(Portugal) / (Brazil)	FW	2003-2011	313	174	2010 FIFA World Cup participant
Elpídio Silva	(Brazil)	FW	2003-2006	29	6	
Clayton	(Brazil)	FW	2003-2005	8	0	
Ânderson Polga	(Brazil)	DF	2003-2012	221	0	
Paíto	(Mozambique)	DF	2003-2004	24	0	
Mário Sérgio	(Portugal)	DF	2003-2006	12	0	
Luís Lourenço	(Angola)	FW	2003-2006	17	4	
Joseph Enakarhire	(Nigeria)	DF	2004-2005	19	0	
Rogério	(Brazil)	DF	2004-2006	41	4	
Roudolphe Douala	(Cameroon)	FW	2004-2007	47	5	2006 Africa Cup of Nations participant
Mauricio Pinilla	(Chile)	FW	2004–2007	20	5	
Tinga	(Brazil)	MF	2004	20	0	
José Semedo	(Portugal)	MF	2004-2007	0	0	
Silvestre Varela	(Portugal)	MF	2004-2008	2	0	
Deivid	(Brazil)	FW	2005-2006	36	9	
Miguel Veloso	(Portugal)	MF	2005-2010	98	4	2007 UEFA European Under-21 Football Championship, UEFA Euro 2008 and 2010 FIFA World Cup participant
Nani	(Portugal)	MF	2005–2007; 2014–2015	58	9	2006 UEFA European Under-21 Football Championship and 2007 UEFA European Under-21 Football Championship participant
João Moutinho	(Portugal)	MF	2005–2010	163	21	2006 UEFA European Under-21 Football Championship, 2007 UEFA European Under-21 Football Championship and UEFA Euro 2008 participant
Wender	(Brazil)	FW	2005	9	0	
Tonel	(Portugal)	DF	2005-2010	117	10	
Edson	(Brazil)	DF	2005-2006	1	0	
Mário Felgueiras	(Portugal)	GK	2005-2007	0	0	
Bruninho	(Portugal)	MF	2005-2006	0	0	
Yannick Djaló	(Portugal)	FW/MF	2005-2011	98	23	
Emídio Rafael	(Portugal)	DF	2005-2007	0	0	
Mota	(Brazil)	FW	2005	5	0	
Rui Patrício	(Portugal)	GK	2006-2018	327	0	UEFA Euro 2008, UEFA Euro 2012, 2014 FIFA World Cup and UEFA Euro 2016 participant
Leandro Romagnoli	(Argentina)	MF	2006 2006–2009	65	7	
Pontus Farnerud	(Sweden)	MF	2006-2008	23	0	
Yannick Pupo	(Brazil)	MF	2006-2008	0	0	
Koke	(Spain)	FW	2006	6	2	
Ronny	(Brazil)	MF	2006-2010	38	1	
Abel Ferreira	(Portugal)	DF	2006–2011	111	2	
Carlos Paredes	(Paraguay)	MF	2006-2008	18	0	
Carlos Bueno	(Uruguay)	FW	2006-2007	14	4	
Bruno Pereirinha	(Portugal)	MF	2006-2013	86	2	
Celestino	(Cape Verde)	MF	2006-2009	0	0	
Zezinando	(Guinea-Bissau) / (Portugal)	MF	2006-2009	0	0	
David Caiado	(Portugal)	MF	2006-2008	1	0	
Alecsandro	(Brazil)	FW	2006-2007	35	8	
Fábio Paim	(Brazil)	FW	2006-2010	0	0	
Derlei	(Brazil)	FW	2007-2009	27	8	
Simon Vukčević	(Montenegro)	RW	2007–2011	134	27	
Vladimir Stojković	(Serbia)	GK	2007-2010	9	0	Men's Football at the 2008 Summer Olympics participant
Daniel Carriço	(Portugal)	DF	2007–2012	91	2	
Adrien Silva	(Portugal)	MF	2007–2017	168	32	UEFA Euro 2016 participant
Marián Had	(Slovakia)	DF	2007-2008	5	0	
Marat Izmailov	(Russia)	MF	2007-2008 2008–2013	59	9	UEFA Euro 2012 participant
Luis Páez	(Paraguay)	FW	2007-2009	2	0	
Milan Purović	(Montenegro)	FW	2007-2011	15	2	
Fábio Paím	(Portugal)	MF	2007-2010	0	0	
Tiago Pinto	(Portugal)	DF	2007-2009	0	0	
Gladstone	(Brazil)	DF	2007-2008	13	1	
Pedro Silva	(Brazil)	DF	2007-2011	24	1	
Hélder Postiga	(Portugal)	FW	2008–2011	113	18	UEFA Euro 2008 participant
Rodrigo Tiuí	(Brazil)	FW	2008-2009	14	1	
André Santos	(Portugal)	MF	2008-2013	37	2	
William Owusu	(Ghana)	FW	2008-2014	0	0	
Ricardo Batista	(Portugal)	GK	2008-2011	0	0	
Marco Matias	(Portugal)	MF	2008-2010	0	0	
Matías Fernández	(Chile)	MF	2009–2012	117	19	2010 FIFA World Cup and 2011 Copa América participant
Miguel Ángel Angulo	(Spain)	MF/FW/DF	2009	4	0	
Ibrahim Rabiu	(Nigeria)	MF	2009-2010	0	0	
Victor Golas	(Brazil)	GK	2009-2014	0	0	
Rui Fonte	(Portugal)	FW	2009-2011	0	0	
Felipe Caicedo	(Ecuador)	FW	2009	7	0	
Renato Neto	(Brazil)	MF	2009-2014	8	1	
Pedro Mendes	(Portugal)	DF	2009-2013	3	0	
André Martins	(Portugal)	MF	2009-2016	72	3	
Pedro Mendes	(Portugal)	MF	2010–2011	18	0	2010 FIFA World Cup participant
Maniche	(Portugal)	MF	2010–2011	17	1	
Mexer	(Mozambique)	DF	2010-2012	0	0	
Cédric	(Portugal)	DF	2010–2015	67	2	UEFA Euro 2016 participant
Evaldo	(Brazil)	DF	2010-2014	42	0	
Florent Sinama Pongolle	(France)	FW	2010-2012	5	1	
Timo Hildebrand	(Germany)	GK	2010-2011	0	0	
João Pereira	(Portugal)	DF	2010–2012; 2015–2016 2021	105	6	UEFA Euro 2012 participant
Marco Torsiglieri	(Argentina)	DF	2010-2011	16	0	
Diogo Salomão	(Portugal)	FW	2010-2016	15	2	
Alberto Zapater	(Spain)	MF	2010-2011	22	2	
Cédric Soares	(Portugal)	DF	2010-2015	67	2	
Nuno André Coelho	(Portugal)	DF	2010-2011	9	0	
Jaime Valdés	(Chile)	MF	2010-2012	24	5	
Nuno Reis	(Portugal)	DF	2010-2015	0	0	
Amido Baldé	(Guinea-Bissau)	FW	2010-2012	0	0	
Emiliano Insúa	(Argentina)	DF	2011–2013	37	1	
Ricky van Wolfswinkel	(Netherlands)	FW	2011–2013	55	28	
William Carvalho	(Portugal)	MF	2011– 2018	143	10	2014 FIFA World Cup and UEFA Euro 2016 participant
João Mário	(Portugal)	MF	2011–2016 2020–2021	65	11	UEFA Euro 2016 participant
Ricardo Esgaio	(Portugal)	DF	2011-2017 2021-	73	1	
Diego Capel	(Spain)	MF	2011-2015	99	10	
Oguchi Onyewu	(United States)	DF	2011-2013	17	4	
Stijn Schaars	(Netherlands)	MF	2011-2013	37	3	
Valeri Bojinov	(Bulgaria)	FW	2011-2013	8	2	
André Carrillo	(Peru)	MF/FW	2011-2016	110	11	
Zezinho	(Guinea-Bissau)	MF	2011-2014	5	0	
Cristiano	(Brazil)	MF	2011	4	0	
Luis Aguiar	(Uruguay)	MF	2011-2012	0	0	
Jeffrén Suárez	(Venezuela)	FW	2011-2014	24	5	
Santiago Arias	(Colombia)	DF	2011-2013	7	0	
Fabián Rinaudo	(Argentina)	MF	2011-2014	36	2	
Diego Rubio	(Chile)	FW	2011-2015	11	1	
Marcelo Boeck	(Brazil)	GK	2011-2016	4	0	
Betinho	(Portugal)	FW	2011-2015	3	0	
Alberto Rodríguez	(Peru)	DF	2011-2012	7	0	
Tiago Ilori	(Portugal)	DF	2011-2013 2019–2023	14	0	
Marcos Rojo	(Argentina)	DF	2012–2014	49	5	2014 FIFA World Cup participant
Eric Dier	(England)	DF/MF	2012-2014	27	1	
Gaël Etock	(Cameroon)	FW	2012-2014	0	0	
Khalid Boulahrouz	(Netherlands)	DF	2012-2013	11	0	
Xandão	(Brazil)	DF	2012-2013	23	1	
Valentín Viola	(Argentina)	FW/MF	2012-2016	18	1	
Gelson Fernandes	(Switzerland)	MF	2012-2013	6	0	
Sebastián Ribas	(Uruguay)	FW	2012	5	0	
Zakaria Labyad	(Morocco)	MF/FW	2012-2016	19	2	
Danijel Pranjić	(Croatia)	MF/DF	2012-2013	9	0	
Islam Slimani	(Algeria)	FW	2013-2016 2022	109	57	2014 FIFA World Cup and 2015 Africa Cup of Nations participant
Nii Plange	(Burkina Faso)	MF	2013	1	0	
Jefferson	(Brazil)	DF	2013-2019	88	3	
Miguel Lopes	(Portugal)	DF	2013-2017	24	0	
Maurício	(Brazil)	DF	2013-2015	42	1	
Fabrice Fokobo	(Cameroon)	MF	2013-2018	2	0	
Carlos Mané	(Guinea-Bissau)	MF/FW	2013-2019	62	9	
Gérson Magrão	(Brazil)	MF	2013-2014	9	0	
Iván Piris	(Paraguay)	DF	2013-2014	19	0	
Bruma	(Portugal)	MF	2013	13	1	
Fredy Montero	(Colombia)	FW	2013-2014 2014–2016 2018–2019	20	3	
Joãozinho	(Portugal)	DF	2013	13	0	
Ryan Gauld	(Scotland)	MF	2014-2019	2	0	
Héldon Ramos	(Cape Verde)	MF	2014-2018	12	1	
Ramy Rabia	(Egypt)	DF	2014-2015	0	0	
Junya Tanaka	(Japan)	FW/MF	2014-2016	20	5	
Shikabala	(Egypt)	MF	2014-2015	1	0	
Ousmane Dramé	(France)	MF	2014-2016	0	0	
Simeon Slavchev	(Bulgaria)	MF	2014-2018	0	0	
Tobias Figueiredo	(Portugal)	DF	2014-2018	15	2	
Naby Sarr	(France)	DF	2014-2015	8	0	
Oriol Rosell	(Spain)	MF	2014-2018	12	0	
Rúben Semedo	(Portugal)	DF	2014-2017	38	0	
Daniel Podence	(Portugal)	MF	2014-2018	25	0	
Hadi Sacko	(France)	FW	2014-2017	0	0	
Wallyson Mallmann	(Brazil)	MF	2014-2017 2017–2019	0	0	
Paulo Oliveira	(Portugal)	DF	2014-2017	59	1	
Jonathan Silva	(Argentina)	DF	2014-2019	21	1	
André Geraldes	(Portugal)	DF	2014-2020	0	0	
Ewerton	(Brazil)	DF	2015 2015–2017	18	1	
Teófilo Gutiérrez	(Colombia)	FW	2015-2017	23	11	
Michaël Ciani	(France)	DF	2015	0	0	
Ažbe Jug	(Slovenia)	GK	2015-2017	0	0	
Bruno César	(Brazil)	MF	2015-2018	96	12	
Ezequiel Schelotto	(Italy)	DF/MF	2015-2017	37	0	
Alberto Aquilani	(Italy)	MF	2015-2016	19	3	
Naldo	(Brazil)	DF	2015-2016	18	0	
Bryan Ruiz	(Costa Rica)	MF	2015-2018	86	12	
Gelson Martins	(Portugal)	MF	2015-2018	92	18	
Francisco Geraldes	(Portugal)	MF	2015-2020	15	0	
Sebastián Coates	(Uruguay)	DF	2016-2017 2017–2024	216	19	
Bas Dost	(Netherlands)	FW	2016-2019	84	76	
Radosav Petrović	(Serbia)	MF	2016-2019	16	0	
Marcelo Meli	(Argentina)	MF	2016	0	0	
Joel Campbell	(Costa Rica)	FW	2016-2017	19	3	
João Palhinha	(Portugal)	MF	2016-2022	72	4	
Marvin Zeegelaar	(Netherlands)	DF/MF	2016-2017	31	0	
Alan Ruiz	(Argentina)	MF	2016-2019	28	6	
Hernán Barcos	(Argentina)	FW	2016-2017	8	0	
Luc Castaignos	(Netherlands)	FW	2016-2019	17	0	
Lazar Marković	(Serbia)	MF	2016	6	1	
Lukas Spalvis	(Lithuania)	FW	2016-2018	0	0	
Douglas	(Brazil)	DF	2016-2017	2	0	
Bruno Fernandes	(Portugal)	MF	2017-2020	83	39	
Cristiano Piccini	(Italy)	DF	2017-2018	24	0	
Rafael Leão	(Portugal)	MF	2017-2018	3	1	
Fábio Coentrão	(Portugal)	DF/MF	2017-2018	25	1	
Marcos Acuña	(Argentina)	DF	2017-2020	85	7	
Seydou Doumbia	(Ivory Coast)	FW	2017-2018	14	0	
Romain Salin	(France)	GK	2017-2019	9	0	
Jérémy Mathieu	(France)	DF	2017-2020	71	6	
Gelson Dala	(Angola)	MF/FW	2017-2020	1	0	
Stefan Ristovski	(North Macedonia)	DF	2017-2021	52	0	
Iuri Medeiros	(Portugal)	MF	2017-2019	6	0	
Rodrigo Battaglia	(Argentina)	MF	2017-2022	56	1	
Jovane Cabral	(Cape Verde)	MF	2018-2024	72	14	
Raphinha	(Brazil)	MF	2018-2019	28	6	
Luís Maximiano	(Portugal)	GK	2018-2021	25	0	
Renan Ribeiro	(Brazil)	GK	2018-2019 2019–2022	11	0	
Lumor Agbenyenu	(Ghana)	DF	2018-2021	8	0	
Nemanja Gudelj	(Serbia)	DF/MF	2018-2019	27	1	
Abdoulay Diaby	(Mali)	MF	2018-2021	31	2	
Stefano Sturaro	(Italy)	MF	2018-2019	0	0	
Thierry Correia	(Portugal)	DF	2018-2019	4	0	
Emiliano Viviano	(Italy)	GK	2018-2019	0	0	
Bruno Paz	(Angola)	MF	2018-2022	0	0	
Bruno Gaspar	(Angola)	DF	2018-2022	16	1	
Wendel	(Brazil)	MF	2018-2020	54	4	
Miguel Luís	(Portugal)	MF	2018-2020	10	1	
Josip Mišić	(Croatia)	MF	2018-2021	8	0	
Luís Neto	(Portugal)	DF	2019-2024	68	0	
Luiz Phellype	(Brazil)	FW	2019-2023	30	14	
Gonzalo Plata	(Ecuador)	MF	2019-2022	30	3	
Valentin Rosier	(France)	DF	2019-2021	9	0	
Idrissa Doumbia	(Ivory Coast)	MF	2019-2023	34	1	
David Wang	(Spain)	MF	2019	0	0	
Cristian Borja	(Colombia)	DF	2019-2021	36	1	
Jesé	(Spain)	MF/FW	2019-2020	12	1	
Rafael Camacho	(Portugal)	MF	2019-2024	19	0	
Luciano Vietto	(Argentina)	FW/MF	2019-2020	27	5	
Matheus Nunes	(Brazil)	MF	2019-2022	76	7	
Pedro Mendes	(Portugal)	FW	2019-2022	6	0	
Eduardo Henrique	(Brazil)	MF	2019-2023	15	0	
Fernando	(Brazil)	FW	2019	0	0	
Filipe Chaby	(Portugal)	MF	2019-2022	0	0	
Diogo Sousa	(Portugal)	GK	2019-2021	0	0	
Gonçalo Inácio	(Portugal)	DF	2020-	113	7	
Pedro Porro	(Spain)	DF	2020-2022 2022–2023	14	2	
Tiago Tomás	(Portugal)	FW	2020-2023	48	3	
Antonio Adán	(Spain)	GK	2020-2024	118	0	
Nuno Mendes	(Portugal)	DF	2020-2022	40	1	
Nuno Santos	(Portugal)	MF	2020-	136	25	
Eduardo Quaresma	(Portugal)	DF	2020-	67	4	
Pedro Gonçalves	(Portugal)	MF	2020-	165	75	
Zouhair Feddal	(Morocco)	DF	2020-2022	36	2	
Andraž Šporar	(Slovenia)	FW	2020-2022	29	9	
Yannick Bolasie	(Democratic Republic of the Congo)	MF	2020	14	1	
Vitorino Antunes	(Portugal)	DF	2020-2021	8	0	
Bruno Tabata	(Brazil)	MF	2020-2022	37	3	
João Silva	(Portugal)	DF	2020-2021	0	0	
Joelson Fernandes	(Portugal)	FW	2020	4	0	
Matheus Reis	(Brazil)	DF	2021-2026	125	3	
Geny Catamo	(Mozambique)	MF/DF	2021-	87	16	
Pablo Sarabia	(Spain)	MF	2021-2022	29	15	
Dário Essugo	(Portugal)	MF	2021-2025	12	0	
Manuel Ugarte	(Uruguay)	MF	2021-2023	56	0	
Gonçalo Esteves	(Portugal)	DF	2021-2024	4	0	
João Virgínia	(Portugal)	GK	2021-2022	1	0	
Diego Callai	(Brazil)	GK	2021-	0	0	
Flávio Nazinho	(Portugal)	DF	2021-2024	5	0	
Paulinho	(Portugal)	FW	2021-2024	96	34	
André Paulo	(Portugal)	GK	2021-2023	2	0	
Hidemasa Morita	(Japan)	MF	2022-	112	11	
Jerry St. Juste	(Netherlands)	DF	2022-2026	46	1	
Rodrigo Ribeiro	(Portugal)	FW	2022-	6	0	
Rochinha	(Portugal)	MF	2022-2024	16	1	
Franco Israel	(Uruguay)	GK	2022-2025	24	0	
Marcus Edwards	(Cyprus)	MF	2022-2025	77	15	
Sotiris Alexandropoulos	(Greece)	MF	2022-	6	0	
Abdul Fatawu	(Ghana)	MF	2022-2024	6	0	
Chico Lamba	(Portugal)	DF	2022-2024	1	0	
Francisco Trincão	(Portugal)	MF	2022-2023 2023-	99	25	
José Marsà	(Spain)	DF	2022-2023	3	0	
Arthur Gomes	(Brazil)	MF	2022-2023	24	1	
Iván Fresneda	(Spain)	DF	2023-	46	4	
Viktor Gyökeres	(Sweden)	FW	2023-2025	66	68	
Afonso Moreira	(Portugal)	MF	2023-2025	2	0	
Ousmane Diomande	(Ivory Coast)	DF	2023-	87	5	
Morten Hjulmand	(Denmark)	MF	2023-	85	8	
Youssef Chermiti	(Portugal)	FW	2023	16	3	
Tiago Ferreira	(Portugal)	MF	2023-2024	0	0	
Héctor Bellerín	(Spain)	DF	2023	10	1	
Mateo Tanlongo	(Argentina)	MF	2023-	9	0	
Rafael Pontelo	(Brazil)	DF	2024-	1	0	
Koba Koindredi	(France)	MF	2024-	4	0	
Vladan Kovačević	(Bosnia and Herzegovina)	GK	2024-2025	6	0	
Zeno Debast	(Belgium)	DF	2024-	6	0	
Conrad Harder	(Denmark)	FW	2024-2025	32	6	
Maximiliano Araújo	(Uruguay)	MF/DF	2024-	57	8	
João Simões	(Portugal)	MF	2024-	27	1	
Rui Silva	(Portugal)	GK	2025-	32	0	
João Virgínia	(Portugal)	GK	2025-	2	0	
Giorgi Kochorashvili	(Georgia (country))	MF	2025-	18	0	
Luis Suárez	(Colombia)	FW	2025-	32	28	
