= List of Portugal international footballers born outside Portugal =

This list includes all the Portuguese players who played for the Portugal senior national football team who are born outside Portugal. Almost all of this players (94 totally) are born in the former Portuguese colonies, while others (the minority) are naturalized or born abroad.

== List by country of birth ==
Last update on 17 November 2026

Country	Total	Notes
Angola	29	Includes 26 players born in the Portuguese Angola
Mozambique	23	Includes 23 players born in the Portuguese Mozambique
Guinea-Bissau	11	Includes 4 players born in the Portuguese Guinea
Brazil	8	
Cape Verde	8	Includes 6 players born in the Portuguese Cape Verde
France	5	
Canada	2	
(Democratic Republic of the Congo) DR Congo	2	Includes 2 players born in Zaire
Macau	2	Includes 2 players born in the Portuguese Macau
São Tomé and Príncipe	2	Includes 1 player born in the Portuguese São Tomé
South Africa	2	
Switzerland	2	
Germany	1	
Morocco	1	Born in the French Morocco
Venezuela	1	

== List of players ==
The players in bold are currently representing Portugal.

Country	Birthplace	Player	Caps	Goals	Period	Notes	Ref.
Angola	Portuguese Angola	José Águas	25	11	1952–1962		
Angola	Portuguese Angola	Miguel Arcanjo	9	0	1957–1965		
Angola		**William Carvalho**	80	5	2013–2022	Moved to Portugal as a child.	
Angola		Hélder Costa	1	1	2018	Switched to Angola in 2021.	
Angola	Portuguese Angola	Joaquim Dinis	14	5	1970–1973		
Angola	Portuguese Angola	Carlos Duarte	7	1	1952–1962		
Angola		Edgar	1	0	1998	Born to a Portuguese father. Moved to Portugal as a child.	
Angola	Portuguese Angola	Jorge Ferreira	4	0	1989–1990		
Angola	Portuguese Angola	José Ferreira Pinto	2	0	1965		
Angola	Portuguese Angola	Fernando Freitas	9	0	1972–1976		
Angola	Portuguese Angola	Hélder	35	3	1992–2001		
Angola	Portuguese Angola	Jacinto João	10	2	1968–1974		
Angola	Portuguese Angola	Rui Jordão	43	15	1972–1989		
Angola	Portuguese Angola	José Leal	15	1	1990–1992		
Angola	Portuguese Angola	Lito	2	0	1983		
Angola	Portuguese Angola	Paulo Madeira	25	3	1991–1999		
Angola	Portuguese Angola	Amândio Malta da Silva	5	0	1971		
Angola	Portuguese Angola	José Maria	4	0	1967–1970		
Angola	Portuguese Angola	Aníbal Paciência	1	0	1941		
Angola	Portuguese Angola	Carlos Parente	2	0	1987		
Angola	Portuguese Angola	Paulinho	1	0	1992		
Angola	Portuguese Angola	Fernando Peyroteo	20	15	1938–1949		
Angola	Portuguese Angola	Jorge Plácido	3	2	1987–1989		
Angola	Portuguese Angola	Filipe Ramos	3	0	1992		
Angola	Portuguese Angola	Santana	5	1	1960–1965		
Angola	Portuguese Angola	Seninho	4	1	1976–1978		
Angola	Portuguese Angola	Mário Torres	5	0	1957–1959		
Angola	Portuguese Angola	Vado	3	0	1989–1995		
Angola	Portuguese Angola	José Luís Vidigal	15	0	2000–2002		
Brazil		Celso	3	0	1976–1978		
Brazil		Deco	75	5	2003–2010		
Brazil		Liédson	15	4	2009–2010		
Brazil		Lúcio	5	0	1960–1962		
Brazil		**Otávio**	22	3	2021–2024	Became a Portuguese citizen in 2021.	
Brazil		**Rony Lopes**	2	0	2017–2018	Born to a Portuguese mother. Moved to Portugal at age 4.	
Brazil		**Matheus Nunes**	21	2	2021–	Moved to Portugal at age 12.	
Brazil		Pepe	141	8	2007–2024	Moved to Portugal at age 18.	
Brazil		**Dyego Sousa**	2	0	2019		
Canada		Daniel Fernandes	2	0	2007–2009	Born to a Portuguese father.	
Canada		Ricardo Ferreira	1	0	2017	Born to Portuguese parents. Switched to Canada in 2021.	
Cape Verde	Portuguese Cape Verde	Carlos Alhinho	15	0	1973–1982		
Cape Verde	Portuguese Cape Verde	Henrique Ben David	6	4	1950–1952		
Cape Verde	Portuguese Cape Verde	Óscar Duarte	1	0	1978		
Cape Verde		Nélson	4	0	2009–2012	Became a Portuguese citizen in 2005.	
Cape Verde	Portuguese Cape Verde	Neno	9	0	1989–1996		
Cape Verde	Portuguese Cape Verde	Oceano da Cruz	54	8	1985–1998	Moved to Portugal as a child.	
Cape Verde	Portuguese Cape Verde	Paris	1	0	1983		
Cape Verde		Rolando	21	0	2009–2018	Moved to Portugal at age 14.	
(Democratic Republic of the Congo) DR Congo	Zaire	José Bosingwa	27	0	2007–2015	Born to a Portuguese father. Moved to Portugal as a child.	
(Democratic Republic of the Congo) DR Congo	Zaire	Ariza Makukula	4	1	2007–2008	Born to a Portuguese mother.	
France		**Raphaël Guerreiro**	65	4	2014–2023	Born to a Portuguese father.	
France		Anthony Lopes	14	0	2015–2021	Born to Portuguese parents.	
France		Petit	57	4	2001–2008	Born to Portuguese parents. Moved to Portugal at age 2.	
France		**Kévin Rodrigues**	3	0	2017–2018	Born to Portuguese parents. Previously has been a France youth international.	
France		Adrien Silva	26	1	2014–2018	Born to a Portuguese father. Moved to Portugal at age 11.	
Germany		**Cédric**	34	1	2014–2022	Born to Portuguese parents. Moved to Portugal at age 2.	
Guinea-Bissau		**Bruma**	12	2	2017–	Moved to Portugal as a child.	
Guinea-Bissau		Yannick Djaló	1	0	2010		
Guinea-Bissau		Eder	35	5	2012–2018	Moved to Portugal as a child. Scored the winning goal in the UEFA Euro 2016 Final.	
Guinea-Bissau	Portuguese Guinea	Alberto Fonseca	9	2	1978–1986		
Guinea-Bissau		**Toti Gomes**	2	0	2023–		
Guinea-Bissau		Edgar Ié	1	0	2017	He switched to Guinea-Bissau in 2021.	
Guinea-Bissau		**Geovany Quenda**	1	0	2026–		
Guinea-Bissau		**Danilo Pereira**	74	2	2015–2024	Moved to Portugal at age 5.	
Guinea-Bissau	Portuguese Guinea	Reinaldo	6	1	1979–1983		
Guinea-Bissau	Portuguese Guinea	Samuel	5	0	1991–1992		
Guinea-Bissau	Portuguese Guinea	Arnaldo Silva	1	0	1974		
Macau	Portuguese Macau	Joaquim Pacheco	1	0	1957		
Macau	Portuguese Macau	Augusto Rocha	7	0	1958–1963		
Morocco	French Morocco	Jacques Pereira	1	0	1981	Born to Portuguese parents.	
Mozambique	Portuguese Mozambique	Abel	4	0	1972–1973		
Mozambique	Portuguese Mozambique	Acúrsio	8	0	1959–1960		
Mozambique	Portuguese Mozambique	Jorge Cadete	33	5	1990–1998		
Mozambique	Portuguese Mozambique	Mário Coluna	57	8	1955–1968		
Mozambique	Portuguese Mozambique	Alberto Costa Pereira	22	0	1955–1965		
Mozambique	Portuguese Mozambique	Djão	1	0	1981		
Mozambique	Portuguese Mozambique	Eusébio	64	41	1961–1973		
Mozambique	Portuguese Mozambique	Hilário	40	0	1959–1971		
Mozambique	Portuguese Mozambique	Joaquim Jorge	2	0	1969		
Mozambique	Portuguese Mozambique	Juca	6	0	1952–1956		
Mozambique	Portuguese Mozambique	Armando Manhiça	2	0	1968		
Mozambique	Portuguese Mozambique	Matateu	27	13	1952–1960		
Mozambique	Portuguese Mozambique	Augusto Matine	9	0	1970–1973		
Mozambique	Portuguese Mozambique	Messias	6	0	1972		
Mozambique	Portuguese Mozambique	Perdigão	1	0	1957		
Mozambique	Portuguese Mozambique	José Pérides	2	0	1961		
Mozambique	Portuguese Mozambique	Rui Rodrigues	12	3	1967–1976		
Mozambique	Portuguese Mozambique	Vítor Santos	1	0	1983		
Mozambique	Portuguese Mozambique	Shéu	24	1	1976–1986		
Mozambique	Portuguese Mozambique	Vicente	20	0	1959–1966		
Mozambique	Portuguese Mozambique	Abel Xavier	20	2	1993–2002		
Mozambique	Portuguese Mozambique	Carlos Xavier	10	0	1981–1993		
Mozambique	Portuguese Mozambique	Pedro Xavier	4	0	1985–1989		
São Tomé and Príncipe		**Gedson Fernandes**	2	0	2018		
São Tomé and Príncipe	(Portugal) Portuguese São Tomé and Príncipe	Vítor Guilhar	2	0	1941		
South Africa		Dimas	44	0	1995–2002	Born to Portuguese parents.	
South Africa		David Júlio	4	0	1960–1961		
Switzerland		**Diogo Costa**	54	0	2021–	Born to Portuguese parents. Moved to Portugal at age 7.	
Switzerland		**Pedro Mendes**	1	0	2018	Born to Portuguese parents.	
Venezuela		Danny	38	4	2008–2016	Born to Portuguese parents. Moved to Portugal at age 15.	
