= 1982 Supertaça Cândido de Oliveira =

- Event: Supertaça Cândido de Oliveira (Portuguese Super Cup)
Braga	Sporting CP
3	7
- 3–7 on aggregate.

First leg
Braga	Sporting CP
2	1
- Date: 9 October 1982
- Venue: Estádio Primeiro de Maio, Braga
- Referee: Armando Paraty (Porto)

Second leg
Sporting CP	Braga
6	1
- Date: 14 December 1982
- Venue: Estádio José Alvalade, Lisbon
- Referee: Francisco Silva (Algarve)

The 1982 Supertaça Cândido de Oliveira was the 4th edition of the Supertaça Cândido de Oliveira, the annual Portuguese football season-opening match contested by the winners of the previous season's top league and cup competitions (or cup runner-up in case the league- and cup-winning club is the same). The 1982 Supertaça Cândido de Oliveira was contested over two legs, and opposed Braga and Sporting CP of the Primeira Liga. Sporting CP qualified for the SuperCup by winning the 1981–82 Primeira Divisão and the 1981–82 Taça de Portugal, whilst Braga qualified for the Supertaça as the cup runners-up.

The first leg which took place at the Estádio Primeiro de Maio, saw 2–1 victory for Braga. The second leg which took place at the Estádio José Alvalade, saw the Leões defeat Os Arsenalistas 6–1 (7–3 on aggregate) to claim their first Supertaça.

== First leg ==
=== Details ===
9 October 1982

Braga	2–1	Sporting CP
Jorge Gomes 12'; Fontes 31'		Freire 77'

Estádio Primeiro de Maio, Braga
Referee: Armando Paraty (Porto)

Braga	Sporting CP

GK	1	(Portugal) Valter Onofre (c)
DF	(Portugal) Guedes
DF	(Portugal) João Cardoso
DF	(Portugal) António Paris
DF	(Portugal) Artur Correia
MF	(Portugal) Vítor Oliveira
MF	(Portugal) Vítor Santos
MF	(Portugal) José Germano
FW	(Brazil) Wando	(substituted off) 65'
FW	(Portugal) Armando Fontes
FW	(Brazil) Jorge Gomes	(substituted off) 42'
Substitutes:
FW	(Portugal) Fernando Malheiro	(substituted on) 42'
FW	(Brazil) Manoel Costa	(substituted on) 65'
Manager:
(Portugal) Juca

GK	1	(Hungary) Ferenc Mészáros
DF	(Portugal) Virgílio Lopes
DF	(Brazil) Uchoa
DF	(Portugal) José Eduardo
DF	(Socialist Federal Republic of Yugoslavia) Dušan Bukovac
DF	(Portugal) Zezinho	(substituted off) 46'
DF	(Portugal) Vitorino Bastos
DF	(Portugal) Francisco Barão
MF	(Bulgaria) Vanio Kostov
FW	(Portugal) Carlos Freire
FW	(Portugal) Manuel Fernandes (c)
Substitutes:
DF	(Portugal) Kikas	(substituted on) 46'
Manager:
(Portugal) António Oliveira

Match officials

- Assistant referees:
- Fourth official:

Match rules

- 90 minutes.
- Maximum of three substitutions

== Second leg ==
=== Details ===
14 December 1982

Sporting CP	6–1	Braga
Fernandes 2', 81', 84'; Jordão 9', 64'; Lito 67'		Oliveira 86'

Estádio José Alvalade, Lisbon
Referee: Francisco Silva (Algarve)

Sporting CP	Braga

GK	1	(Hungary) Ferenc Mészáros
DF	(Portugal) Marinho
DF	(Portugal) Virgílio Lopes
DF	(Portugal) Kikas	(substituted off) 74'
DF	(Bulgaria) Vanio Kostov
MF	(Portugal) Carlos Xavier
MF	(Portugal) Mário Jorge
MF	(Portugal) Lito
FW	(Portugal) Rui Jordão
FW	(Portugal) Manuel Fernandes (c)
FW	(Portugal) Carlos Freire	(substituted off) 68'
Substitutes:
DF	(Portugal) José Eduardo	(substituted on) 74'
DF	(Socialist Federal Republic of Yugoslavia) Dušan Bukovac	(substituted on) 68'
Manager:
(Portugal) António Oliveira

GK	1	(Portugal) Valter Onofre (c)
DF	(Portugal) Dito
DF	(Portugal) Artur Correia
DF	(Portugal) António Paris
DF	(Portugal) Guedes	(substituted off) 58'
DF	(Portugal) João Cardoso
MF	(Portugal) Vítor Santos
MF	(Portugal) José Germano	(substituted off) 52'
FW	(Brazil) Wando
FW	(Brazil) Jorge Gomes
FW	(Portugal) Armando Fontes
Substitutes:
MF	(Portugal) Spencer	(substituted on) 52'
MF	(Portugal) Vítor Oliveira	(substituted on) 58'
Manager:
(Portugal) Juca

1982 Supertaça Cândido de Oliveira Winners
Sporting CP
1st Title

Match officials

- Assistant referees:
- Fourth official:

Match rules

- 90 minutes.
- Maximum of three substitutions
