= 1982 Taça de Portugal final =

- Event: 1981–82 Taça de Portugal
Braga	Sporting CP
0	4
- Date: 29 May 1982
- Venue: Estádio Nacional, Oeiras
- Referee: Raúl Nazaré (Setúbal)

The 1982 Taça de Portugal final was the final match of the 1981–82 Taça de Portugal, the 42nd season of the Taça de Portugal, the premier Portuguese football cup competition organized by the Portuguese Football Federation (FPF). The match was played on 29 May 1982 at the Estádio Nacional in Oeiras, and opposed two Primeira Liga sides: Braga and Sporting CP. Sporting CP defeated Braga 4–0 to claim the Taça de Portugal for an eleventh time.

In Portugal, the final was televised live on RTP. As a result of the Leões claiming both the league and cup double in the same season, cup runners-up Braga faced their cup final opponents in the 1982 Supertaça Cândido de Oliveira.

== Match ==
=== Details ===
29 May 1982

Braga	0–4	Sporting CP
		Oliveira 37', 82'; Fernandes 66'; Jordão 71'

Estádio Nacional, Oeiras
Referee: Raúl Nazaré (Setúbal)

Braga	Sporting CP

GK	1	(Portugal) Valter Onofre (c)
DF		(Portugal) Guedes
DF		(Portugal) Artur Correia
DF		(Portugal) João Cardoso
DF		(Portugal) Dito
MF		(Portugal) José Carlos
MF		(Portugal) Serra
MF		(Portugal) Vítor Oliveira	(substituted off) 62'
MF		(Portugal) Vítor Santos
MF		(Portugal) Chico Faria
FW		(Portugal) Armando Fontes
Substitutes:
MF		(Portugal) Spencer
FW	14	(Portugal) Fernando Malheiro	(substituted on) 62'
Manager:
(Portugal) Quinito

GK	1	(Hungary) Ferenc Mészáros
DF		(Portugal) Vitorino Bastos
DF		(Portugal) Augusto Inácio
DF		(Portugal) Virgílio Lopes	(substituted off) 77'
DF		(Portugal) Marinho	(substituted off) 62'
DF		(Portugal) Zezinho
MF	8	(Portugal) Lito
MF	10	(Portugal) António Oliveira
MF		(Portugal) Ademar Marques
FW		(Portugal) Manuel Fernandes (c)
FW	11	(Portugal) Rui Jordão
Substitutes:
DF		(Brazil) Paulo Meneses	(substituted on) 77'
MF	14	(Portugal) António Nogueira	(substituted on) 62'
Manager:
(England) Malcolm Allison

1981–82 Taça de Portugal Winners
Sporting CP
11th Title

Match officials

- Assistant referees:
- Fourth official:

Match rules

- 90 minutes.
- 30 minutes of extra time if necessary.
- Maximum of two substitutions
