= 1963 Taça de Portugal final =

- Event: 1962–63 Taça de Portugal
| Sporting CP | Vitória de Guimarães |
| 4 | 0 |
- Date: 30 June 1963
- Venue: Estádio Nacional, Oeiras
- Referee: Francisco Guerra (Porto)

The 1963 Taça de Portugal final was the final match of the 1962–63 Taça de Portugal, the 23rd season of the Taça de Portugal, the premier Portuguese football cup competition organized by the Portuguese Football Federation (FPF). The match was played on 30 June 1963 at the Estádio Nacional in Oeiras, and opposed two Primeira Liga sides: Sporting CP and Vitória de Guimarães. Vitória de Guimarães defeated Sporting CP 4–0 to claim their sixth Taça de Portugal.

== Match ==
=== Details ===
30 June 1963

| Sporting CP | 4–0 | Vitória de Guimarães |
|---|---|---|
| Figueiredo 25', 70'; Lúcio 73'; Mascarenhas 87' |

Estádio Nacional, Oeiras
Referee: Francisco Guerra (Porto)

| Sporting CP | Vitória de Guimarães |

| GK | 1 | (Portugal) Joaquim Carvalho (c) |
| DF | | (Portugal) Pedro Gomes |
| DF | | (Portugal) Hilário |
| DF | | (Portugal) Lúcio |
| MF | | (Portugal) João Morais |
| MF | | (Portugal) David Júlio |
| MF | | (Brazil) Osvaldo Silva |
| MF | | (Portugal) José Pérides |
| FW | | (Portugal) Ernesto Figueiredo |
| FW | | (Portugal) Mascarenhas |
| FW | | (Brazil) Géo Carvalho |
Substitutes:
Manager:
(Portugal) Juca

| GK | 1 | (Portugal) Mário Roldão |
| DF | | (Portugal) Daniel |
| DF | | (Portugal) João da Costa (c) |
| DF | | (Portugal) Manuel Pinto |
| MF | | (Portugal) Virgílio |
| MF | | (Brazil) Caiçara |
| MF | | (Portugal) Paulino |
| MF | | (Portugal) Peres |
| FW | | (Portugal) Armindo Silva |
| FW | | (Portugal) António Mendes |
| FW | | (Brazil) Lua |
Substitutes:
Manager:
(Argentina) José Valle

1962–63 Taça de Portugal Winners
Sporting CP
6th Title

Match officials

- Assistant referees:
- Fourth official:

Match rules

- 90 minutes.
- 30 minutes of extra time if necessary.
