= 1961 Taça de Portugal final =

- Event: 1960–61 Taça de Portugal
Leixões	Porto
2	0
- Date: 9 July 1961
- Venue: Estádio das Antas, Porto
- Referee: Décio Freitas (Lisbon)

The 1961 Taça de Portugal final was the final match of the 1960–61 Taça de Portugal, the 21st season of the Taça de Portugal, the premier Portuguese football cup competition organized by the Portuguese Football Federation (FPF). The match was played on 9 July 1961 at the Estádio das Antas in Porto, and opposed two Primeira Liga sides: Leixões and Porto. Leixões defeated Porto 2–0 to claim the Taça de Portugal for the first time.

== Match ==
=== Details ===
9 July 1961

Leixões	2–0	Porto
Silva 68'; Oliveirinha 70'

Estádio das Antas, Porto
Referee: Décio Freitas (Lisbon)

Leixões	Porto

GK	1	(Portugal) José Rosas
DF		(Portugal) Ventura
DF		(Portugal) Santana
DF	3	(Portugal) Joaquim Pacheco (c)
DF		(Portugal) Jacinto Santos
DF		(Portugal) Raúl Machado
MF		(Brazil) Osvaldo Silva
MF		(Portugal) António Medeiros
FW	7	(Portugal) Oliveirinha
FW		(Portugal) Silva
FW		(Portugal) Gomes
Substitutes:
Manager:
(Argentina) Filpo Nunez

GK	1	(Portugal) Acúrsio Carrelo
DF		(Portugal) Virgílio (c)
DF		(Portugal) Miguel Arcanjo
DF		(Portugal) António Barbosa
MF		(Brazil) Ivan Palmeira
MF		(Portugal) Monteiro da Costa
MF		(Portugal) Hernâni
FW		(Portugal) Carlos Duarte
FW		(Portugal) Fernando Perdigão
FW		(Portugal) Noé Castro
FW		(Portugal) Serafim Pereira
Substitutes:
Manager:
(Argentina) Francisco Reboredo

1960–61 Taça de Portugal Winners
Leixões
1st Title

Match officials

- Assistant referees:
- Fourth official:

Match rules

- 90 minutes.
- 30 minutes of extra time if necessary.
