= 1960 Taça de Portugal final =

- Event: 1959–60 Taça de Portugal
Belenenses	Sporting CP
2	1
- Date: 3 July 1960
- Venue: Estádio Nacional, Oeiras
- Referee: Clemente Henriques (Porto)

The 1960 Taça de Portugal final was the final match of the 1959–60 Taça de Portugal, the 20th season of the Taça de Portugal, the premier Portuguese football cup competition organized by the Portuguese Football Federation (FPF). The match was played on 3 July 1960 at the Estádio Nacional in Oeiras, and opposed two Primeira Liga sides: Belenenses and Sporting CP. Belenenses defeated Sporting CP 2–1 to claim the Taça de Portugal for a second time.

== Match ==
=== Details ===
3 July 1960

Belenenses	2–1	Sporting CP
Carvalho 32'; Matateu 62'		Arizaga 18'

Estádio Nacional, Oeiras
Referee: Clemente Henriques (Porto)

Belenenses	Sporting CP

GK	1	(Portugal) José Pereira
DF		(Portugal) Raul Moreira
DF		(Portugal) João Rosendo
MF		(Portugal) Vicente Lucas
MF		(Portugal) Manuel Castro
MF		(Portugal) Francisco Pires (c)
FW		(Portugal) António Carvalho
FW		(Portugal) Estevão Mansidão
FW		(Portugal) Iaúca
FW		(Portugal) Matateu
FW		(Brazil) Tonho
Substitutes:
Manager:
(Brazil) Otto Glória

GK	1	(Portugal) Octávio de Sá
DF		(Portugal) Hilário (c)
DF		(Portugal) Mário Lino
DF		(Portugal) Lúcio Soares
MF		(Portugal) David Júlio
MF		(Portugal) Fernando Mendes
FW		(Argentina) Diego Arizaga
FW		(Brazil) Vadinho
FW		(Peru) Juan Seminario
FW		(Portugal) Hugo Sarmento
FW		(Brazil) Faustino Pinto
Substitutes:
Manager:
(Argentina) Alfredo González

1959–60 Taça de Portugal Winners
Belenenses
2nd Title

Match officials

- Assistant referees:
- Fourth official:

Match rules

- 90 minutes.
- 30 minutes of extra time if necessary.
