= António Morato =

António Morato may refer to:

- António Morato (footballer, born 1937) (1937–2025), Portuguese footballer
- António Morato (footballer, born 1964), Portuguese footballer
