= Morato =

Morato or Morató is a surname. It is most prevalent in Brazil, followed by Spain and the Philippines.

Notable people with this surname include:

- Andrew Eric Feitosa (born 1992), Brazilian footballer commonly known as Morato
- António Henriques Morato (1937–2025), Portuguese footballer
- António Morato (footballer, born 1964), Portuguese footballer
- Joaquín García Morato (1904–1939), Spanish aviator
- Manuel Morato (1933–2021), Filipino politician
- Morato (footballer, born 2001), Brazilian footballer
- Nina Morato (born 1966), French singer-songwriter
- Rosa Morató (born 1979), Spanish runner
- Teresa Morató (born 1998), Andorran footballer
- Tomas Morato (1887-1965), Filipino businessman
