= Yanick =

Yanick is a given name. Notable people with the name include:

- Yanick Dupré (1972–1997), Canadian professional ice hockey player
- Yanick Lehoux (born 1982), Canadian hockey player
- Yanick Paquette (born 1974), Canadian penciller in North American comics
- Yanick Paternotte (born 1951), member of the National Assembly of France

== See also ==
- Yanick Dupre Memorial Award
- Yannick
