= Yannick =

- Pronunciation: [jaˈnik]
- Gender: Male

Origin
- Meaning: Little Yann (Little John)
- Region of origin: Brittany

Other names
- Related names: Yanic, Yanick, Yann, Yannik, Jean, Annick, John, Joan, Sean, Giovanni, Johann, Ian, Ivan, Juan

Yannick is a first name that originated in Brittany, France, where the combination of its two Breton language parts, Yann and -ick, results in the meaning of Little John or Petit Jean in French. It is used as a first name mostly for men and is in use, notably, in French-speaking countries like France, (a part of) Belgium, Switzerland (Romandy), Canada (Quebec), and former French African colonies.

== Notable people with the name 'Yannick' ==
- Yannick (rapper) (born 1978), French rapper
- Yannick Androf (born 1999), French drag artist and model
- Yannick Agnel (born 1992), French swimmer and Olympic champion
- Yannick Anzuluni (born 1988), Congolese basketball player
- Yannick Bellon (1924–2019), French film director, editor and screenwriter
- Yannick Bertrand (born 1980), French alpine skier
- Yannick Bisson (born 1969), Canadian actor
- Yannick Bolasie (born 1989), French-Congolese footballer
- Yannick Dalmas (born 1961), French racing driver
- Yannick Dias Pupo (born 1988), Brazilian footballer
- Yannick Djaló (born 1986), Portuguese footballer
- Yannick Carrasco (born 1993), Belgian footballer
- Yannick Franke (born 1996), Dutch basketball player
- Yannick Gerhardt (born 1994), German footballer
- Yannick Grannec, 21st century French writer
- Yannick Jadot (born 1967), French politician
- Yannick Jauzion (born 1978), French rugby player
- Yannick Mettler (born 1989), Swiss racing driver
- Yannick Monnet (born 1975), French politician
- Yannick Nézet-Séguin (born 1975), French-Canadian conductor
- Yannick Ngakoue (born 1995), American football player
- Yannick Noah (born 1960), French tennis player, singer
- Yannick Ottley (born 1991), Trinidadian cricketer
- Yannick Pelletier (born 1976), Swiss chess player
- Yannick Peeters (born 1996), Belgian cyclist
- Yannick Reine (born 1987), French kickboxer
- Yannick Sagbo (born 1988), French-Ivorian footballer
- Yannick Semedo (born 1995), Cape Verdean footballer
- Yannick Shetty (born 1995), Austrian politician
- Yannick Stopyra (born 1961), French footballer
- Yannick Tremblay (born 1975), French-Canadian ice hockey player
- Yannick Veits (born 1994), German politician
- Yannick Weber (born 1988), Swiss ice hockey player

== Notable people with the name 'Yanic' ==
- Yanic Bercier, Canadian musician
- Yanic Gentry (born 1991), Mexican sailor
- Yanic Konan Niederhäuser (born 2003), Swiss basketball player
- Yanic Perreault (born 1971), French-Canadian ice hockey player
- Yanic Truesdale (born 1970), Canadian actor
- Yanic Wildschut (born 1991), Dutch professional footballer

== See also ==
- Yannick (film), 2023 comedy film by Quentin Dupieux
