= Jacinto Santos =

Portuguese footballer (1941–2023)

Personal information
- Full name: Jacinto José Martins Godinho Santos
- Date of birth: 28 January 1941
- Place of birth: Matosinhos, Portugal
- Date of death: 21 July 2023 (aged 82)
- Place of death: Antwerp, Belgium
- Position: Defender

Youth career
- 1957–1959: Leixões

Senior career*
Years	Team	Apps	(Gls)
1959–1962	Leixões		
1962–1971	Benfica	115	(5)
1971	Leixões		
1972	Porto		

International career
1966–1969	Portugal	5	(2)
- * Club domestic league appearances and goals

Jacinto José Martins Godinho Santos (28 January 1941 – 21 July 2023), known simply as Jacinto, was a Portuguese footballer who played as defender. A Portuguese international, he won one Taça de Portugal with Leixões and seven Primeira Divisão titles with Benfica.

Jacinto died in Antwerp on 21 July 2023, at the age of 82.

== Career ==
Jacinto gained five caps and scored two goals for Portugal. He made his debut 13 November 1966 in Lisbon against Sweden, in a 2–1 defeat.

== Career statistics ==
Jacinto Santos: International goals
No.	Date	Venue	Opponent	Score	Result	Competition
1	27 October 1968	Estádio Nacional, Lisbon, Portugal	Romania	1–0	3–0	1970 World Cup qualification
2	27 October 1968	Estádio Nacional, Lisbon, Portugal	Romania	3–0	3–0	1970 World Cup qualification

== Honours ==
Leixões

- Taça de Portugal: 1960–61

Benfica

- Primeira Liga (7): 1962–63, 1963–64, 1964–65, 1966–67, 1967–68, 1968–69, 1970–71
- Taça de Portugal: 1963–64, 1968–69, 1969–70
- Intercontinental Cup runner-up: 1962
