= Georges Demulder =

Belgian footballer(

Personal information
- Full name: Cecil Georges Demulder
- Date of birth: 12 May 1919
- Place of birth: Elisabethville, Belgian Congo
- Date of death: 6 May 1983 (aged 63)
- Place of death: Brussels, Belgium
- Position: Forward

Youth career
- 1934–1936: White Star

Senior career*
Years	Team	Apps	(Gls)
1936–1939	White Star		
1940–1941	Sporting CP	14	(8)
1941–1947	White Star		

International career
1937–1939	Belgium	2?	(0)
- * Club domestic league appearances and goals

Cecil Georges Demulder (12 May 1919 – 6 May 1983) was a Belgian footballer who played as a forward. He made one appearance for the Belgium national team in 1939. He was a winger for White Star A.C., today's Molenbeek, and for Sporting CP.

== Club career ==
Georges Demulder played his first match for White Star AC in 1936. The club played in the first tier, Belgian Division of Honour. Demulder gradually became an important player in the team and his good performances earned him a selection for the Belgian national team in 1939.

With the Second World War approaching, the Demulder family moved to Portugal, where Georges's father could continue his work in the diamond industry. Georges Demulder joined the top club Sporting Clube de Portugal where he scored 14 goals, topping off with the Portuguese national championship of 1940–41. he scored 8 goals that season, including one against Benfica Lisbon. After the father had died in 1941, officially through a car accident yet according to Georges's brother-in-law Arsène Vaillant by assassination, the Demulder family returned to Brussels.

With more war interruptions, Georges returned to play for White Star AC until it was relegated from the first tier in 1947.

== International career ==
Initially, Demulder joined the second squad of the Belgium national team, playing a match against the Netherlands in 1937.

Demulder played at least one official international match on the first squad of the national team, on 14 May 1939. The match ended in a 2–1 loss for the "Red Devils" against Switzerland. Demulder was only the second White Star player to play on the Belgium national team, after Jean Fievez.

The international career of Demulder was disrupted by the Demulder family fleeing to Lisbon and the Second World War. Demulder's brother-in-law, Arsène Vaillant, playing for the same club, played later on the national team.

== Death ==
Demulder died on 6 May 1983, six days shy of his 64th birthday.
