= Yannick Veits =

German politician (born 1994)

Member of the Landtag of Baden-Württemberg
- Incumbent
- Assumed office 11 May 2026

Personal details
- Born: 1994 (age 31–32)
- Party: Alliance 90/The Greens (since 2017)

Yannick Veits (born 1994) is a German politician who was elected member of the Landtag of Baden-Württemberg in 2026. He has been a municipal councillor of Nußloch since 2019.
