= António Barbosa (footballer) =

Portuguese footballer (born 1931)

Barbosa
Personal information
- Full name: António Fernando Barbosa da Silva
- Date of birth: 3 November 1931 (age 94)
- Place of birth: Porto, Portugal
- Position: Defender

Senior career*
Years	Team	Apps	(Gls)
1955–1956	Boavista		
1956–1962	Porto	92	(0)

International career
1955	Portugal B	1	(0)
1959	Portugal	2	(0)
- * Club domestic league appearances and goals

António Fernando Barbosa da Silva (born 3 November 1931), known simply as Barbosa, is a Portuguese former footballer who played as a defender and made two appearances for the Portugal national team.

== Career ==
Barbosa made his international debut for Portugal on 16 May 1959 in a friendly match against Switzerland, which finished as a 3–4 loss. He made his second and final appearance five days later against Sweden in another friendly, which finished as a 0–2 loss.

== Career statistics ==
=== International ===
Portugal
Year	Apps	Goals
1959	2	0
Total	2	0
