= Vanio Kostov =

Bulgarian footballer

Personal information
- Date of birth: 7 September 1952 (age 74)
- Place of birth: Burgas, Bulgaria
- Position: Central midfielder

Senior career*
Years	Team	Apps	(Gls)
1971–1973	Chernomorets Burgas	53	(4)
1973–1982	Slavia Sofia	220	(11)
1982–1985	Sporting CP	49	(4)
1985–1986	Belenenses	22	(3)
1987–1988	Farense	3	(0)
1988–1989	Bragança	–	(–)

International career
1974–1980	Bulgaria	14	(0)
- * Club domestic league appearances and goals

Vanio Kostov (Bulgarian: Ваньо Костов; born 7 September 1952) is a Bulgarian former professional footballer who played as a central midfielder and is currently a sports agent.

Kostov was part of the Sporting CP team who won the 1982 Supertaça Cândido de Oliveira.
