= António Oliveira (footballer, born 1952) =

Portuguese footballer and manager (born 1952)

Personal information
- Full name: António Luís Alves Ribeiro de Oliveira
- Date of birth: 10 June 1952 (age 74)
- Place of birth: Penafiel, Portugal
- Height: 1.72 m (5 ft 8 in)
- Position: Attacking midfielder

Youth career
- 1968–1971: Porto

Senior career*
Years	Team	Apps	(Gls)
1971–1979	Porto	188	(71)
1979	Betis	10	(1)
1980	Porto	12	(1)
1980–1981	Penafiel	22	(10)
1981–1985	Sporting CP	67	(27)
1985–1986	Marítimo	7	(0)
Total		306	(110)

International career
1974–1983	Portugal	24	(7)

Managerial career
- 1980–1981: Penafiel (player-coach)
- 1982–1983: Sporting CP (player-coach)
- 1985–1986: Marítimo (player-coach)
- 1987–1988: Vitória Guimarães
- 1988: Académica
- 1991–1992: Gil Vicente
- 1993–1994: Braga
- 1994–1996: Portugal
- 1996–1998: Porto
- 1998: Betis
- 2000–2002: Portugal
- 2015: Al Faisaly
- * Club domestic league appearances and goals

António Luís Alves Ribeiro de Oliveira (born 10 June 1952) is a Portuguese former football attacking midfielder and a former manager.

As a player, he notably represented two of the Big Three in his country, Porto and Sporting, amassing totals of 267 matches and 99 Primeira Liga goals between the two and also later managing the former club with great success.

Also an international player, Oliveira had two coaching spells with the Portugal national team, leading them in one World Cup and one European Championship.

== Playing career ==
Born in Penafiel, Porto District, Oliveira made his senior debut with FC Porto, first appearing in the Primeira Liga at the age of 18. From 1974 onwards, with the exception of one year, he always scored in double digits, netting a career-best 19 in the 1977–78 season as the northerners won the national championship after a 19-year drought.

In the summer of 1979, 27-year-old Oliveira moved to La Liga with Real Betis. He returned to Porto the following transfer window due to homesickness, being an important first-team element as the latter side finished second in the league, two points behind Sporting CP.

After helping hometown's F.C. Penafiel retain top-flight status – he left Porto alongside club director Jorge Nuno Pinto da Costa and coach José Maria Pedroto following internal disputes– Oliveira signed with Sporting, helping them to the double in 1981–82. In 1985, aged 33, he moved to C.S. Marítimo, retiring at the end of the campaign with Portuguese top division totals of 296 matches and 109 goals; at both Penafiel and Marítimo, he acted as player-coach.

Oliveira earned 24 caps for Portugal over a nine-year spell, which included his player-manager career at Penafiel. He did not take part, however, in any major international tournament.

== Coaching career ==
Oliveira started managing while still an active player. Exclusively a coach from 1987 onwards, his only full season in his beginnings was 1991–92, when he led modest Gil Vicente F.C. to the 13th position in the top flight.

After helping Portugal to the quarter-finals in UEFA Euro 1996, Oliveira signed for former club Porto, leading it to back-to-back national championships with the addition of one Portuguese Cup, won against S.C. Braga. His first season started with a 5–0 demolition of S.L. Benfica in the domestic Supercup, as the team went on to win the league with 85 points – a record which would last until the 2002–03 campaign, broken by José Mourinho's team– also reaching the quarter-finals of the UEFA Champions League and being eliminated by Manchester United.

In summer 1998, Oliveira was appointed at another former club, Betis, but left the Andalusians before the season started. He returned to the national side two years later, qualifying to the 2002 FIFA World Cup, the first time in 16 years.

Several problems occurred during the preparation for the tournament in Japan and South Korea, and the competition itself: Vítor Baía replaced in-form Ricardo in goalkeeper, Beto played out of position at right back, Luís Figo was in very poor physical condition and Hugo Viana was called as a last-minute replacement for Daniel Kenedy, who tested positive in a doping control test; after one win and two losses in the group stage, Portugal were eliminated and the manager was fired.

Afterwards, Oliveira was elected chairman of Penafiel Futebol Clube. He also majored in law, at the age of 54.

== Personal life ==
He was married to Ivete Oliveira, a former teacher and a businesswoman owner of a well-known auction house in the city of Porto, who revealed in 2025 that she was battling cancer for the second time when she discovered she was being cheated on by her ex-husband, to whom she was married for 22 years. The couple divorced in 2015.

== Career statistics ==
António Oliveira: International goals
No.	Date	Venue	Opponent	Score	Result	Competition
1	15 April 1981	Estádio das Antas, Porto, Portugal	Bulgaria	1–1	1–1	Friendly
2	16 December 1981	Haskovo Stadium, Haskovo, Bulgaria	Bulgaria	0–1	5–2	Friendly
3	16 December 1981	Haskovo Stadium, Haskovo, Bulgaria	Bulgaria	5–2	5–2	Friendly
4	20 January 1982	Nikos Goumas Stadium, Athens, Greece	Greece	1–1	1–2	Friendly
5	20 January 1982	Nikos Goumas Stadium, Athens, Greece	Greece	1–2	1–2	Friendly
6	22 September 1982	Olympic Stadium (Helsinki), Helsinki, Finland	Finland	0–2	0–2	Euro 1984 qualifying
7	21 September 1983	Estádio José Alvalade (1956), Lisbon, Portugal	Finland	5–0	5–0	Euro 1984 qualifying

== Honours ==
=== Player ===
Porto

- Primeira Divisão: 1977–78, 1978–79
- Taça de Portugal: 1976–77

Sporting CP

- Primeira Divisão: 1981–82
- Taça de Portugal: 1981–82
- Supertaça Cândido de Oliveira: 1982

Individual

- Portuguese Footballer of the Year: 1978, 1981, 1982

=== Manager ===
Sporting CP

- Supertaça Cândido de Oliveira: 1982

Porto

- Primeira Divisão: 1996–97, 1997–98
- Taça de Portugal: 1997–98
- Supertaça Cândido de Oliveira: 1996
