= 1981–82 Primeira Divisão =

48th season of top-tier Portuguese football

Primeira Liga
- Season: 1981–82
- Champions: Sporting CP; 16th title
- Relegated: Penafiel; Académico de Viseu; Belenenses; União de Leiria
- European Cup: Sporting CP (first round)
- Cup Winners' Cup: Sporting Braga (first round)
- UEFA Cup: Benfica (first round); Porto (first round); Guimarães (first round)
- Matches: 240
- Goals: 563 (2.35 per match)
- Top goalscorer: Jacques (27 goals)

Statistics of Portuguese Liga in the 1981–82 season.

== Overview ==
It was contested by 16 teams, and Sporting Clube de Portugal won the championship.

C.F. Os Belenenses, who had co-founded the league in 1934 with Sporting, S.L. Benfica and F.C. Porto, was relegated for the first time.

== League standings ==
Pos	Team	Pld	W	D	L	GF	GA	GD	Pts	Qualification or relegation
1	Sporting CP (C)	30	19	8	3	66	26	+40	46	Qualification to European Cup first round
2	Benfica	30	20	4	6	60	22	+38	44	Qualification to UEFA Cup first round
3	Porto	30	17	9	4	46	17	+29	43	Qualification to UEFA Cup first round
4	Vitória de Guimarães	30	13	12	5	42	22	+20	38	Qualification to UEFA Cup first round
5	Rio Ave	30	13	8	9	26	31	−5	34	
6	Portimonense	30	12	8	10	35	24	+11	32	
7	Braga	30	11	8	11	34	42	−8	30	Qualification to Cup Winners' Cup preliminary round
8	Vitória de Setúbal	30	9	10	11	30	35	−5	28	
9	Boavista	30	10	6	14	36	37	−1	26	
10	Espinho	30	7	11	12	32	42	−10	25	
11	Amora	30	6	12	12	29	37	−8	24	
12	Estoril	30	7	10	13	30	41	−11	24	
13	Penafiel (R)	30	9	5	16	20	37	−17	23	Relegation to Segunda Divisão
14	Académico de Viseu (R)	30	9	5	16	24	52	−28	23	Relegation to Segunda Divisão
15	Belenenses (R)	30	5	10	15	28	48	−20	20	Relegation to Segunda Divisão
16	União de Leiria (R)	30	8	4	18	25	50	−25	20	Relegation to Segunda Divisão

Source: RSSSF
(C) Champions; (R) Relegated

== Results ==
Home \ Away	ACV	AMO	BEL	BEN	BOA	BRA	ESP	EST	PEN	PTM	POR	RAV	SCP	ULE	VGU	VSE
Académico de Viseu		0–0	2–0	0–2	1–0	2–0	0–0	3–0	1–0	3–0	0–1	0–0	0–2	2–1	2–0	2–0
Amora	4–2		2–1	1–0	0–0	5–0	1–1	1–1	1–1	0–0	0–0	2–1	2–3	2–0	2–2	0–1
Belenenses	2–0	0–0		1–4	1–0	0–0	4–0	2–1	1–1	2–2	0–1	0–0	1–3	1–0	2–2	1–1
Benfica	3–0	2–1	3–1		2–0	3–0	5–1	3–0	1–0	2–0	3–1	3–0	1–1	3–0	1–0	2–1
Boavista	6–1	2–0	2–1	2–1		0–1	5–0	1–0	4–0	1–3	0–6	0–0	2–1	1–0	1–1	2–1
Braga	5–0	2–0	1–1	1–3	2–2		2–1	2–1	2–0	0–3	1–1	1–0	0–2	3–1	2–0	1–1
Espinho	4–1	4–2	2–0	1–2	0–0	0–1		2–1	3–0	0–0	0–0	5–1	0–1	3–1	0–0	0–0
Estoril	1–0	0–0	1–1	0–0	1–0	1–1	1–1		2–0	2–1	1–1	0–0	0–3	2–0	2–2	4–2
Penafiel	1–0	1–0	3–1	0–3	1–0	0–1	2–0	3–1		0–1	0–0	2–0	0–2	3–1	0–0	0–1
Portimonense	4–0	1–1	5–1	1–1	1–0	2–1	2–0	1–2	0–0		1–1	0–1	2–0	2–0	0–0	2–0
Porto	3–0	1–1	3–0	2–1	2–1	3–1	3–0	1–0	1–0	1–0		1–2	2–0	3–0	0–0	2–1
Rio Ave	1–1	1–0	3–0	1–0	3–1	2–1	1–0	0–0	1–0	1–0	0–2		0–0	2–0	2–1	1–0
Sporting CP	4–0	3–0	2–2	3–1	3–3	3–1	1–1	3–2	6–0	1–0	1–0	7–1		2–2	2–2	4–1
União de Leiria	1–1	2–1	1–0	0–3	1–0	4–0	2–2	2–1	2–1	0–1	1–3	1–0	0–2		1–0	0–0
Vitória de Guimarães	3–0	4–0	2–1	1–0	1–0	0–0	2–0	2–1	1–0	2–0	1–0	3–1	0–0	4–1		5–0
Vitória de Setúbal	4–0	1–0	1–0	2–2	2–0	1–1	1–1	3–1	0–1	1–0	1–1	0–0	0–1	2–0	1–1	

Legend: Blue = home team win; Yellow = draw; Red = away team win.

== Season statistics ==
=== Top goalscorers ===
Rank	Player	Club	Goals
1	(Portugal) Jacques	Porto	27
2	(Portugal) Rui Jordão	Sporting	26
3	(Portugal) Nené	Benfica	24
4	(Portugal) Joaquim Rocha	Vitória de Guimarães	16
5	(Portugal) Manuel Fernandes	Sporting	15
6	(Brazil) Caio Cambalhota	Amora	14
7	(Portugal) António Oliveira	Sporting	12
7	(Portugal) N'Habola	União de Leiria	12
7	(Portugal) Norton de Matos	Portimonense	12
10	(Portugal) José Abrantes	Estoril	10
