= Guinea-Bissau national football team results (2020–present) =

This page details the match results and statistics of the Guinea-Bissau national football team from 2020 to present.

== Results ==
Guinea-Bissau's score is shown first in each case.

Date	Venue	Opponents	Score	Competition	Guinea-Bissau scorers	Att.	Ref.
11 November 2020	Stade Lat-Dior, Thiès (A)	Senegal	0–2	2021 Africa Cup of Nations qualification	—	0 (Note: Match held behind closed doors due to the COVID-19 pandemic.)	
15 November 2020	Estádio 24 de Setembro, Bissau (H)	Senegal	0–1	2021 Africa Cup of Nations qualification	—	0	
26 March 2021	Mavuso Sports Centre, Manzini (A)	Eswatini	3–1	2021 Africa Cup of Nations qualification	Djaló 15', Semedo 24', Pelé 50'		
30 March 2021	Estádio 24 de Setembro, Bissau (H)	Congo	3–0	2021 Africa Cup of Nations qualification	Piqueti 45', Mendy 74', Jorghinho 80'		
1 September 2021	Stade Olympique, Nouakchott (H) (Note: Match played in Nouakchott, Mauritania, as Guinea-Bissau's ground was deemed unfit to host international football by CAF.)	Guinea	1–1	2022 FIFA World Cup qualification	Mendes 46'	500	
7 September 2021	Al Hilal Stadium, Omdurman (A)	Sudan	4–2	2022 FIFA World Cup qualification	Piqueti 8', 39', Mendy 11', Baldé 82'	0	
6 October 2021	Prince Moulay Abdellah Stadium, Rabat (A)	Morocco	0–5	2022 FIFA World Cup qualification		0	
9 October 2021	Stade Mohammed V, Casablanca (H) (Note: Match played in Casablanca, Morocco, as Guinea-Bissau's ground was deemed unfit to host international football by CAF.)	Morocco	0–3	2022 FIFA World Cup qualification			
12 November 2021	General Lansana Conté Stadium, Conakry (A)	Guinea	0–0	2022 FIFA World Cup qualification		0	
15 November 2021	Marrakesh Stadium, Marrakesh (H) (Note: Match played in Marrakesh, Morocco, as Guinea-Bissau's ground was deemed unfit to host international football by CAF.)	Guinea	0–0	2022 FIFA World Cup qualification		0	
