= Arsène Vaillant =

Belgian footballer (1922–2007)

Personal information
- Full name: Arsène René Vaillant
- Date of birth: 13 June 1922
- Place of birth: Saint-Hubert, Belgium
- Date of death: 30 April 2007 (aged 84)
- Position: Defender

Senior career*
Years	Team	Apps	(Gls)
1941–1948	White Star		
1948–1955	Anderlecht		

International career
1944–1951	Belgium	12	(1)
- * Club domestic league appearances and goals

Arsène René Vaillant (13 June 1922 – 30 April 2007) was a Belgian footballer who played as a defender. He made twelve appearances for the Belgium national team from 1944 to 1951.
