= Serra (footballer) =

Portuguese footballer

Personal information
- Full name: José Carvalho Gonçalves
- Date of birth: 8 December 1961 (age 64)
- Place of birth: Braga, Portugal
- Height: 1.68 m (5 ft 6 in)
- Position: Midfielder

Senior career*
Years	Team	Apps	(Gls)
1980–1987	Braga	141	(15)
1987–1989	Chaves	45	(1)
1989–1991	Vitória de Setúbal	51	(5)
1991–1992	Paços de Ferreira	23	(1)
1992–1994	Amares		
- * Club domestic league appearances and goals

José Carvalho Gonçalves, known as Serra (born 9 December 1961) is a Portuguese former professional footballer who played as a midfielder.

He played 12 seasons and 260 games in the Primeira Liga, mostly with Braga.

== Career ==
Serra made his professional debut in the Primeira Liga for Braga on 31 May 1981 as a starter in a 1–1 draw against Boavista.
