= Manuel Fernandes (footballer, born 1951) =

Portuguese footballer and manager (1951–2024)

Personal information
- Full name: Manuel José Tavares Fernandes
- Date of birth: 5 June 1951
- Place of birth: Sarilhos Pequenos, Portugal
- Date of death: 27 June 2024 (aged 73)
- Place of death: Lisbon, Portugal
- Height: 1.72 m (5 ft 8 in)
- Position: Striker

Youth career
- 1967–1969: Sarilhense

Senior career*
Years	Team	Apps	(Gls)
1969–1975	CUF	132	(34)
1975–1977	Sporting CP	55	(47)
1977	Rochester Lancers		
1977–1979	Sporting CP	52	(24)
1979	New England Tea Men		
1979–1987	Sporting CP	218	(120)
1987–1988	Vitória Setúbal	28	(16)
Total		485	(241)

International career
1975–1987	Portugal	31	(7)

Managerial career
- 1988–1990: Vitória Setúbal
- 1990–1991: Estrela Amadora
- 1991–1992: Ovarense
- 1992–1994: Sporting CP (assistant)
- 1994–1995: Campomaiorense
- 1996–1997: Tirsense
- 1997: Vitória Setúbal
- 1998–2001: Santa Clara
- 2001: Sporting CP
- 2003–2005: Penafiel
- 2007–2008: Atlético Aviação
- 2008–2009: União Leiria
- 2009–2011: Vitória Setúbal
- * Club domestic league appearances and goals

Manuel José Tavares Fernandes (5 June 1951 – 27 June 2024) was a Portuguese football striker and manager.

His playing career was mainly associated with Sporting CP, which he later also coached. At 255 goals in all competitions, he was the second-highest goalscorer in the club's history.

Over 19 seasons, in which he also represented two other teams, Fernandes amassed Primeira Liga totals of 486 matches, an all-time record, and 241 goals.

== Club career ==
Born in Sarilhos Pequenos, Moita, Setúbal District, Fernandes started his career with local CUF, scoring 43 goals in five years. In 1975 he got his first break, joining Primeira Liga (the only tier he competed in in a career which spanned almost two decades) club Sporting CP, netting more than 250 times in official matches and only trailing legendary Fernando Peyroteo who totalled over 500.

Halfway through his career at Sporting, Fernandes accepted an offer from the United States to play for the Rochester Lancers for a season in 1977. Two years later, he returned to North American soil to represent the New England Tea Men, a team based in the Greater Boston area.

In 1985–86, aged 34/35, Fernandes produced his best individual season, scoring 30 goals – and winning the Bola de Prata – for the eventual third-placed side, behind Porto and Benfica. On 14 December 1986, he had arguably his finest moment as a professional, when he netted four to help to the 7–1 home demolition of Benfica.

After that season in Lisbon, Fernandes closed out his career at Vitória de Setúbal, reuniting with his former Sporting teammate Rui Jordão, adding a further 20 total goals to his tally and retiring at 37. In his last campaign, he notably scored against Sporting in a 2–1 home win, mere minutes after kick-off, and the Sadinos finished in a comfortable eighth place.

== International career ==
Fernandes won 31 caps for Portugal, scoring seven goals. Even though he had that stellar campaign with Sporting, he was excluded from the 1986 FIFA World Cup squad, with the tournament being marred by the Saltillo Affair; he still travelled to Mexico courtesy of his club, later telling the media: "But I wasn't in Saltillo. I watched the games and that was it. I went on vacation near Guadalajara."

== Coaching career ==
Fernandes began his coaching career with Setúbal in 1988, and stayed with them a further year (several other spells there would befall in the future). Then, he went on to manage several teams: Estrela da Amadora, Ovarense, Campomaiorense, Tirsense and Santa Clara; the Azores club would be the first from the region to play in the Portuguese top division.

With Sporting, Fernandes had already served as an assistant to England's Bobby Robson, leaving following the head coach's dismissal. In January 2001 he began a short managerial spell with the Lions, winning the Supertaça Cândido de Oliveira before quitting his post later that year.

In October 2009, after a successful promotion from the Segunda Liga with União de Leiria, and having already started the following top-flight campaign, Fernandes bought out his contract and returned to struggling Setúbal for a third stint, which ended on 1 March 2011.

== Personal life and death ==
Fernandes' son Tiago was also a football player and manager. In December 2020, Sporting dedicated Gate 7 of the Estádio José Alvalade to him.

In May 2024, Sporting chairman Frederico Varandas and club footballer Viktor Gyökeres visited Fernandes in hospital with the league championship cup, before a reception at Lisbon City Hall. He died on 27 June at age 73, three days after surgery for a tumour.

== Career statistics ==
Scores and results list Portugal's goal tally first, score column indicates score after each Fernandes goal.

List of international goals scored by Manuel Fernandes
No.	Date	Venue	Opponent	Score	Result	Competition
1	17 November 1976	Estádio da Luz, Lisbon, Portugal	Denmark	1–0	1–0	1978 World Cup qualification
2	9 October 1977	Idrætsparken, Copenhagen, Denmark	Denmark	3–1	4–2	1978 World Cup qualification
3	29 October 1977	Silesian Stadium, Chorzow, Poland	Poland	1–1	1–1	1978 World Cup qualification
4	16 November 1977	Estádio de São Luís, Faro, Portugal	Cyprus	4–0	4–0	1978 World Cup qualification
5	18 November 1981	Estádio da Luz, Lisbon, Portugal	Scotland	1–1	2–1	1982 World Cup qualification
6	18 November 1981	Estádio da Luz, Lisbon, Portugal	Scotland	2–1	2–1	1982 World Cup qualification
7	29 October 1986	Wankdorf Stadium, Bern, Switzerland	Switzerland	1–1	1–1	Euro 1988 qualifying

== Honours ==
=== Player ===
Sporting CP

- Primeira Divisão: 1979–80, 1981–82
- Taça de Portugal: 1977–78, 1981–82
- Supertaça Cândido de Oliveira: 1982

Individual

- Primeira Divisão top scorer: 1985–86

=== Manager ===
Sporting CP

- Supertaça Cândido de Oliveira: 2000
