= Fábio Paim =

Portuguese footballer

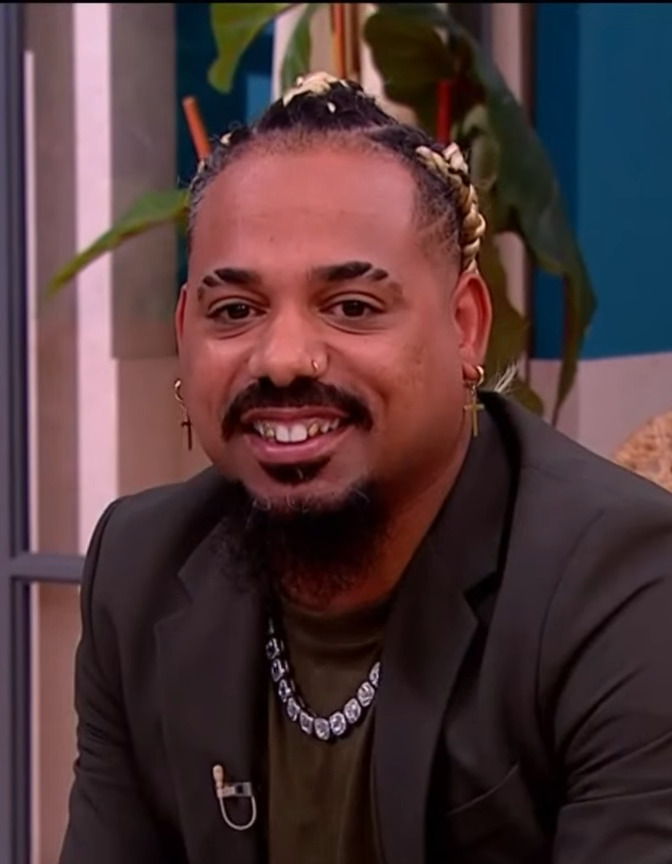
- Paim in 2024

Personal information
- Full name: Fábio Miguel Malheiro Paim
- Date of birth: 15 February 1988 (age 38)
- Place of birth: Estoril, Portugal
- Height: 1.80 m (5 ft 11 in)
- Position: Winger

Youth career
- AFD Torre
- 1997–2006: Sporting CP

Senior career*
Years	Team	Apps	(Gls)
2006–2010	Sporting CP	0	(0)
2007	→ Olivais Moscavide (loan)	11	(1)
2007	→ Trofense (loan)	13	(1)
2008	→ Paços Ferreira (loan)	7	(0)
2008	→ Chelsea (loan)	0	(0)
2009	→ Rio Ave (loan)	0	(0)
2009–2010	→ Real Massamá (loan)	2	(0)
2010	Torreense	3	(0)
2011–2012	1º Agosto		
2011	→ Benfica Luanda (loan)		
2012	Futebol Benfica	2	(0)
2013	Al Kharaitiyat		
2013	Oliveirense	1	(0)
2014–2015	Mosta	2	(0)
2015	Nevėžis	11	(2)
2015	Union 05		
2016	Sintra Football		
2017	Paraíba do Sul	0	(0)
2017–2018	Leixões B		
2020	LZS Starowice	6	(0)
Total		58+	(4+)

International career
2003	Portugal U16	2	(0)
2004–2005	Portugal U17	16	(3)
2006	Portugal U18	3	(0)
2006–2007	Portugal U19	8	(1)
2007–2008	Portugal U20	12	(3)
2008	Portugal U21	1	(0)
- * Club domestic league appearances and goals

Fábio Miguel Malheiro Paim (born 15 February 1988) is a Portuguese former professional footballer who played as a winger.

Touted as a promising player at a young age while he was in Sporting CP, including by Cristiano Ronaldo who was also a youth academy graduate at the club, he would later fail to make any significant impact in the sport. After an unsuccessful four-month loan spell at Chelsea in 2008, he went on to play for a host of minor teams in many countries without settling anywhere.

== Club career ==
Born in Estoril, Lisbon District, Paim was once regarded as the most promising young player in Portugal by Cristiano Ronaldo, who said upon arriving at Manchester United: "If you think I'm good, just wait until you see Fábio Paim". He joined Sporting CP's youth system at the age of 9, beginning his senior career at C.D. Olivais e Moscavide loaned alongside teammate Bruno Pereirinha. He spent the 2007–08 season with two teams, making his Primeira Liga debut with F.C. Paços de Ferreira after starting with C.D. Trofense in the Segunda Liga.

Paim moved to Luiz Felipe Scolari's Chelsea in August 2008, but only appeared for their reserves during a four-month spell. On 11 December he left the English club and moved, yet again on loan, to Rio Ave FC. Coach Carlos Brito decided not to keep him mainly due to his high salary, and the player did not manage to attract any interest before the end of winter transfer window, spending the rest of the campaign unattached.

On 25 September 2009, both Sporting and Real S.C. – which had Filipe Ramos, a former Sporting player, as a coach, with the side competing in the third tier – agreed to a one-year loan deal until the end of 2009–10, making Paim the ninth Sporting player loaned out to that team. In the 2010 off-season, without any official appearances to his credit, the 22-year-old left the Estádio José Alvalade for good, signing with S.C.U. Torreense of the same league. He left after only a couple of months, spending the following years in Angola with C.D. Primeiro de Agosto and S.L. Benfica (Luanda).

Paim joined C.F. Benfica of the Portuguese third division for the 2012–13 season. After some months trying to regain match fitness, he made his official debut against C.D. Mafra; in December 2012, however, he moved teams and countries again, penning a two-year deal with Al Kharaitiyat SC of the Qatar Stars League.

On 19 August 2014, Paim signed a two-year contract for Mosta F.C. in the Maltese Premier League. In April of the following year, he joined FK Nevėžis in Lithuania.

In the summer of 2015, Paim moved to Union 05 Kayl-Tétange in Luxembourg's division two. He was dismissed from the team in September, for "unprofessional behavior".

On 10 November 2017, after a fleeting spell in Brazilian amateur football, Paim signed with the reserves of Leixões S.C. in the Porto Football Association. In August 2020, he agreed to a short contract at LZS Starowice in the Polish fifth tier, making six league appearances for the club.

== International career ==
Paim won 42 caps for Portugal across all youth levels, scoring seven goals. Of Angolan descent, as his parents hailed from Huambo Province, he was eligible to represent its senior team and hoped to be selected to the 2012 Africa Cup of Nations, but ultimately was not called.

Paim's only appearance for the Portugal under-21s was on 14 October 2008, when he came on as a 69th-minute substitute for Daniel Candeias in a 1–0 friendly loss to Ukraine held in Vila Nova de Gaia.

== Personal life ==
Paim was acquitted of sexual crimes in 2012 in Portugal, and in 2015 in Lithuania. In August 2019, he was arrested by the Public Security Police after an undetermined amount of illegal drugs were found in his possession in Estoril. He was eventually acquitted on the grounds that wire tapping was not admissible evidence in a court of law, but he previously served time in the Caxias prison.

In October 2023, Paim stated that he would have been a better footballer than Cristiano Ronaldo if he had worked half as hard as him, and that he believed that he would have won the Ballon d'Or in place of Ronaldo. The following month, Ronaldo responded to those claims on Instagram by commenting on the podcast clip: "WTF. Who is this guy?"

In September 2024, Paim shot a pornographic film.

== Honours ==
Trofense

- Segunda Liga: 2007–08
