= Aníbal Paciência =

Portuguese footballer

Personal information
- Full name: Aníbal da Fonseca Paciência
- Date of birth: 11 May 1915
- Place of birth: Luanda, Angola
- Date of death: Deceased
- Position: Midfielder

Senior career*
Years	Team	Apps	(Gls)
1936–1944	Sporting		

International career
1941	Portugal	1	(0)
- * Club domestic league appearances and goals

Aníbal da Fonseca Paciência (born 11 May 1915 - deceased) was a Portuguese footballer, who played as a midfielder.
