= João Cardoso (footballer, born 1951) =

Portuguese footballer

Personal information
- Full name: João Soares Cardoso
- Date of birth: 27 September 1951 (age 75)
- Place of birth: Sacavém, Portugal
- Position: Defender

Youth career
- 1967–1968: Sacavenense

Senior career*
Years	Team	Apps	(Gls)
1970–1977	Belenenses	125	
1977–1985	Sporting Braga	213	(20)

International career
	Portugal	8	
- * Club domestic league appearances and goals

João Soares Cardoso (born 27 September 1951 in Sacavém) is a former Portuguese footballer who played as a defender who is the first-team coach of Primeira Liga club Braga.

Cardoso gained 8 caps for the Portugal national team.
