= Carlos Freire (footballer) =

Portuguese footballer

Personal information
- Full name: Carlos Manuel da Silva Freire
- Date of birth: 18 April 1959 (age 67)
- Place of birth: Sintra, Portugal
- Position: Forward

Youth career
- 1975–1977: Sporting CP

Senior career*
Years	Team	Apps	(Gls)
1977–1983	Sporting CP	98	(12)
1983–1985	Vitória Setúbal	48	(10)
1985–1986	Portimonense	23	(3)
1986–1987	Celta	17	(1)
1987	Beira-Mar		
1987–1989	Estoril		
1989–1991	Beira-Mar	29	(0)
1992–1993	Sintrense	4	(0)
Total		219	(26)

International career
1981	Portugal	1	(0)
- * Club domestic league appearances and goals

Carlos Manuel da Silva Freire (born 18 April 1959 in Sintra, Lisbon) is a Portuguese retired footballer who played as a forward.
