= António Paris =

Portuguese footballer

Paris
Personal information
- Full name: António Cândido Duarte Paris
- Date of birth: 11 June 1957 (age 69)
- Place of birth: São Vicente, Cape Verde
- Position: Centre-back

Youth career
- 1974–1975: Messinense

Senior career*
Years	Team	Apps	(Gls)
1977–1979	Estoril-Praia	29	(0)
1979–1980	Nacional	7	(0)
1980–1982	Estoril-Praia	48	(0)
1982–1984	Braga	36	(1)
1984–1985	Salgueiros	16	(2)
1985–1986	Estoril-Praia		
1987–1988	União Almeirim		

International career
1983	Portugal	1	(0)
- * Club domestic league appearances and goals

António Cândido Duarte Paris (born 13 June 1957) is a Portuguese former professional footballer who played as a centre-back. He made one appearance for the Portugal national team.
