= Acúrsio Carrelo =

Portuguese footballer

Acúrsio
Personal information
- Full name: Acúrsio Freire Alves Carrelo
- Date of birth: 16 March 1931
- Place of birth: Lourenço Marques, Mozambique
- Date of death: 9 January 2010 (aged 78)
- Position: Goalkeeper

Senior career*
Years	Team	Apps	(Gls)
1955	Ferroviário Lourenço Marques		
1955–1961	FC Porto		(1)

International career
1959–1960	Portugal	8	(0)
- * Club domestic league appearances and goals

Acúrsio Freire Alves Carrelo (16 March 1931, in Lourenço Marques – 9 January 2010), better known as Acúrsio, was a Portuguese footballer. He played as a goalkeeper. He also had a rink hockey player career as a goalkeeper. He played for FC Porto.

== Football career ==
Acúrsio gained 8 caps for Portugal and made his debut 20 May 1959 in Gothenburg against Sweden, in a 0-2 defeat. He played 4 matches in the 1960 European Nations' Cup qualification rounds.
