= Yannick Pupo =

Brazilian footballer

Personal information
- Full name: Yannick Dias Pupo
- Date of birth: June 17, 1988 (age 38)
- Place of birth: São Paulo, Brazil
- Height: 1.74 m (5 ft 9 in)
- Position: Midfielder

Team information
- Current team: Grêmio Prudente

Youth career
- Corinthians Paulista

Senior career*
Years	Team	Apps	(Gls)
2006–2008	Sporting de Lisbon	0	(0)
2007	→ Juventude (loan)	1	(0)
2007	→ Palmeiras (loan)		
2008–2010	→Marília	2	(0)
2010	Corinthians Al.	1	(1)
2010–	Grêmio Prudente		
- * Club domestic league appearances and goals

Yannick Dias Pupo (born 17 June 1988 in São Paulo) is a Brazilian footballer. He is a free agent since he was released in January 2010 by Marília.

Signed by Sporting at age 18 in summer 2006, he was loaned back to Brazil for Juventude on 31 August 2007. He was loaned to Palmeiras on 1 March 2008, for their Campeonato Paulista.
