= Francisco Barão =

Portuguese footballer

Personal information
- Full name: Francisco da Cruz Barão
- Date of birth: 13 June 1957 (age 69)
- Place of birth: Mértola, Portugal
- Height: 1.76 m (5 ft 9 in)
- Position: Full-back

Team information
- Current team: Sporting B (assistant manager)

Youth career
- 1972–1973: Prior Velho
- 1973–1976: Sporting CP

Senior career*
Years	Team	Apps	(Gls)
1976–1983	Sporting CP	114	(1)
1983–1988	Portimonense	75	(0)

International career
	Portugal U21	6	(0)

Managerial career
- 1988–1990: Portimonense (assistant manager)
- 1990–1992: Oriental
- 1992–1993: Sacavenense
- 1993–1994: Portosantense
- 1994–1996: Camacha
- 1996–1997: O Elvas
- 1997–1998: Machico
- 1998–1999: O Elvas
- 1999–2002: Estrela Portalegre
- 2002–2003: Caldas
- 2003–2004: Espinho
- 2005: Atlético CP
- 2005: Odivelas
- 2005–2006: Caniçal
- 2006–2007: Sertanense
- 2007–2009: Eléctrico
- 2010–2011: Praiense
- 2011–2013: Pinhalnovense
- 2013–2014: Sporting B (assistant manager)
- 2014: Sporting B
- 2014–: Sporting B (assistant manager)
- * Club domestic league appearances and goals

Francisco da Cruz Barão (born 13 June 1957), known as Francisco Barão, is a Portuguese former footballer who played as a full-back and current assistant manager of Sporting B.

After a year as an assistant manager at Sporting B, Barão was appointed as the new manager of Sporting B in the summer of 2014 following Abel Ferreira's departure. Ten games into the 2014–15 season, a run of poor results culminated in Barão being demoted to assistant manager which led to João de Deus' appointment as the new manager.
