= Manuel Guedes =

Portuguese footballer

Guedes
Personal information
- Full name: Manuel Fernando de Azevedo Guedes
- Date of birth: 2 May 1953 (age 73)
- Place of birth: Gondomar, Portugal
- Height: 1.70 m (5 ft 7 in)
- Position: Defender

Senior career*
Years	Team	Apps	(Gls)
1972–1974	Porto	59	(0)
1974–1975	Leixões	17	(0)
1975–1977	Beira-Mar	57	(1)
1977–1981	Varzim	109	(4)
1981–1986	Braga	101	(0)
1986–1987	São Pedro da Cova		
1987–1988	Gondomar		
- * Club domestic league appearances and goals

Manuel Fernando de Azevedo Guedes, known as Guedes (born 2 May 1953) is a Portuguese former footballer who played as a defender.

He played 14 seasons and 343 games in the Primeira Liga for Varzim, Braga, Porto, Beira-Mar and Leixões.

== Career ==
Guedes made his Primeira Liga debut for Porto on 11 September 1972 as a starter in a 0–1 loss to Sporting.
