= Armando Manhiça =

Portuguese footballer

Personal information
- Full name: Armando António dos Santos Manhiça
- Date of birth: 12 April 1943
- Place of birth: Lourenço Marques, Mozambique
- Date of death: 12 September 2009 (aged 66)
- Position: Defender

Senior career*
Years	Team	Apps	(Gls)
1964	Sporting Lourenço Marques		
1964–1970	Sporting		
1970–1974	FC Porto		

International career
1968	Portugal	2	(0)
- * Club domestic league appearances and goals

Armando António dos Santos Manhiça (born 12 April 1943 - deceased 12 September 2009) was a Portuguese footballer who played as defender.
