= Octávio de Sá =

Mozambican footballer

Personal information
- Full name: Octávio Augusto César de Sá
- Date of birth: 2 November 1935 (age 90)
- Place of birth: Lourenço Marques, Mozambique
- Date of death: 1990 (aged 54 or 55)
- Height: 1.89 m (6 ft 2 in)
- Position: Goalkeeper

Youth career
- 1953–1954: Sporting Clube de Portugal

Senior career*
Years	Team	Apps	(Gls)
1954–1960	Sporting Clube de Portugal	76	(0)
1966	Durban United	3	(0)
- * Club domestic league appearances and goals

Octavio de Sá (born 2 November 1935) was a Mozambican football goalkeeper who played for Sporting Clube de Portugal and Durban United. He is the father of South African international Roger De Sá.
