= Adriano Spencer =

Cape Verdean footballer (1959–2006)

Personal information
- Full name: Adriano Santos Spencer
- Date of birth: 11 February 1959
- Place of birth: São Vicente, Cape Verde
- Date of death: 24 November 2006 (aged 47)
- Position: Midfielder

Youth career
- 1976–1977: Benfica

Senior career*
Years	Team	Apps	(Gls)
1975–1976	Almada		
1977–1979	Benfica	0	(0)
1980–1981	Alcobaça		
1981–1988	Braga	117	(12)
1988–1989	Académico de Viseu	0	(0)
- * Club domestic league appearances and goals

Adriano Santos Spencer, known as Spencer (11 February 1959 – 24 November 2006) was a Cape Verdean professional footballer who played as a midfielder.

He spent six seasons and 117 games in the Primeira Liga for Braga. He played one game for Benfica in the Taça de Portugal.

== Career ==
Spencer made his Primeira Liga debut for Braga on 30 August 1981 as a late substitute in a 1–0 victory over Rio Ave.
