= Armando Fontes =

Portuguese footballer

Personal information
- Full name: Armando Gonçalves de Medeiros Fontes
- Date of birth: 18 January 1958 (age 68)
- Place of birth: Vila Franca do Campo, Portugal
- Position: Forward

Senior career*
Years	Team	Apps	(Gls)
1977–1978	Lusitânia		
1978–1986	Braga	144	(35)
1986–1987	Chaves	18	(1)
1987–1990	Santa Clara		
- * Club domestic league appearances and goals

Armando Gonçalves de Medeiros Fontes (born 18 January 1958) is a Portuguese former footballer who played as a forward, spending most of his career with Braga.

== Career ==
Fontes made his professional debut in the Primeira Liga for Braga on 27 August 1978 as a late substitute in a 4–0 victory against Académico de Viseu. Over his career, he played 162 games and scored 36 goals in the top division of Portuguese football.
