= 1957–58 Primeira Divisão =

24th season of top-tier Portuguese football

Primeira Liga
- Season: 1957–58
- Champions: Sporting CP; 10th title
- Relegated: S.C. Salgueiros; Oriental
- European Cup: Sporting
- Matches: 182
- Goals: 634 (3.48 per match)

Statistics of Portuguese Liga in the 1957/1958 season.

== Overview ==
Location of teams in the 1957–58 Liga

It was contested by 14 teams, and Sporting Clube de Portugal won the championship.

== League standings ==
Pos	Team	Pld	W	D	L	GF	GA	GD	Pts	Qualification or relegation
1	Sporting CP (C)	26	19	5	2	79	21	+58	43	Qualification to European Cup preliminary round
2	Porto	26	21	1	4	64	25	+39	43	
3	Benfica	26	17	2	7	59	23	+36	36	
4	Belenenses	26	12	4	10	54	42	+12	28	
5	Braga	26	9	7	10	51	52	−1	25	
6	Lusitano de Évora	26	10	4	12	37	36	+1	24	
7	Barreirense	26	10	4	12	42	52	−10	24	
8	Torreense	26	11	2	13	30	46	−16	24	
9	Académica	26	10	4	12	45	40	+5	24	
10	Caldas	26	9	5	12	30	46	−16	23	
11	Vitória de Setúbal	26	9	4	13	37	59	−22	22	
12	CUF Barreiro	26	8	3	15	40	59	−19	19	
13	Salgueiros (R)	26	7	2	17	45	65	−20	16	Relegation to Segunda Divisão
14	Oriental (R)	26	4	5	17	21	68	−47	13	Relegation to Segunda Divisão

Source: rsssf.org
(C) Champions; (R) Relegated

== Results ==
Home \ Away	ACA	BAR	BEL	BEN	BRA	CAL	CUF	LUS	ORI	POR	SAL	SCP	SCT	VSE
Académica		4–0	2–2	0–1	4–4	1–1	1–0	0–1	3–1	0–1	3–1	0–1	1–0	6–1
Barreirense	4–1		2–0	1–2	3–1	4–1	1–3	2–2	2–2	2–1	3–2	0–1	4–3	2–1
Belenenses	2–0	3–2		2–1	9–3	0–1	4–0	0–0	4–0	1–3	6–2	3–3	3–2	2–1
Benfica	3–1	3–0	0–1		0–0	5–1	1–0	1–0	7–0	2–3	9–1	2–0	1–0	4–0
Braga	1–3	2–2	3–2	0–1		1–0	5–1	1–0	5–0	3–2	4–1	0–5	7–0	4–1
Caldas	2–1	1–0	1–0	3–2	0–0		2–2	1–0	3–0	1–3	1–1	1–3	1–0	1–2
CUF Barreiro	2–4	0–2	1–2	0–2	2–2	3–1		2–0	5–3	2–1	2–1	3–3	1–2	7–1
Lusitano Évora	1–0	3–1	3–2	4–0	3–2	1–2	4–2		3–1	0–2	5–0	1–1	3–1	0–1
Oriental	1–3	2–1	0–1	0–0	1–1	0–0	1–2	2–1		1–2	3–2	0–5	0–1	0–0
Porto	4–2	3–0	4–1	1–0	4–2	3–1	4–0	1–0	5–0		5–1	2–1	1–1	5–0
Salgueiros	2–3	1–2	2–0	1–3	0–0	5–2	4–0	5–0	4–1	1–2		0–1	3–1	4–0
Sporting CP	1–1	7–1	3–2	2–0	3–0	3–0	5–0	3–0	5–0	3–0	5–0		6–1	2–2
Torreense	2–1	0–0	2–1	1–3	1–0	1–0	1–0	2–1	3–1	0–1	1–0	0–3		1–3
Vitória de Setúbal	1–0	3–1	1–1	1–6	4–0	5–2	2–0	1–1	0–1	0–1	3–1	2–4	1–3	

Source: rsssf.org
Legend: Blue = home team win; Yellow = draw; Red = away team win.
