= Artur (footballer, born 1955) =

Portuguese footballer

Personal information
- Full name: Artur Soares Correia
- Date of birth: 15 March 1955 (age 71)
- Place of birth: Braga, Portugal
- Position: Defender

Youth career
- 1970–1974: Sporting Braga

Senior career*
Years	Team	Apps	(Gls)
1975–1987	Sporting Braga	255	(1)
1987–1988	Sporting Espinho	11	(0)

International career
1978	Portugal B	1	(0)
1979	Portugal	1	(0)
- * Club domestic league appearances and goals

Artur Soares Correia (born 15 March 1955), known simply as Artur, is a Portuguese former footballer who played as a defender.

He gained 1 cap for Portugal, appearing in a friendly against Spain on 26 September 1979.
