= Miguel Arcanjo =

Angolan-Portuguese footballer

Personal information
- Full name: Miguel Arcanjo Arsénio de Oliveira
- Date of birth: 13 May 1932 (age 94)
- Place of birth: Nova Lisboa, Angola
- Position: Centre back

Senior career*
Years	Team	Apps	(Gls)
1950–1966	Porto	228	(0)

International career
1957–1965	Portugal	9	(0)
- * Club domestic league appearances and goals

Miguel Arcanjo Arsénio de Oliveira (born 13 May 1932) is an Angolan-born former Portuguese footballer. He played as a central defender.

== Career ==
After playing professionally in Angola with Sporting de Benguela, Arcanjo became one of the most highly sought after football players in the European league. In 1950, he signed a professional contract to play with FC Porto (FCP) in Portugal, making him the first African player in the history of FCP. During a lengthy ship ride from Angola to Portugal, he developed an eye infection that almost ended his soccer career. The following summer of 1951, retina surgery saved Arcanjo from blindness and increased his chances of playing professional once again. Arcanjo was the driving force behind FCP's success in the 1950s to early '60s and went on to become one of the best players in the club's history.

Arcanjo gained 9 caps for Portugal. After establishing himself as the best defender in Portugal, he made his debut on 26 May 1957 in Lisbon against Italy, in a 3–0 victory.

== Honours ==
Porto

- Primeira Liga: 1955–56, 1958–59
- Taça de Portugal: 1955–56, 1957–58

== See also ==
- List of one-club men
