= David Júlio =

South African-born Portuguese footballer

David Julius
Personal information
- Full name: David Abraam Julius
- Date of birth: 8 January 1932 (age 94)
- Place of birth: Johannesburg, South Africa
- Position: Midfielder

Senior career*
Years	Team	Apps	(Gls)
1957–1964	Sporting CP	145	(9)

International career
1960–1961	Portugal	4	(0)
- * Club domestic league appearances and goals

David Abraam Julius (Portuguese, David Abraão Júlio) (born 8 January 1932) is a former South African born Portuguese footballer who played as midfielder.

== Football career ==
He was one of the first two footballers from South Africa to sign with overseas clubs, alongside Steve Mokone who joined Cardiff City. Júlio gained 4 caps for Portugal and made his debut 27 April 1960 in Ludwigshafen am Rhein against West Germany, in a 1–2 defeat.

== Honours ==
- 1956-57 Portuguese Cup
- 1957-58 Primeira Divisão
- 1961-62 Primeira Divisão
- 1963-64 UEFA Cup Winners' Cup
