= Juca =

Portuguese footballer and manager (1929–2007)

Personal information
- Full name: Júlio Cernadas Pereira
- Date of birth: 13 January 1929
- Place of birth: Lourenço Marques, Mozambique
- Date of death: 11 October 2007 (aged 78)
- Place of death: Lisbon, Portugal
- Position: Midfielder

Senior career*
| Years | Team | Apps | (Gls) |
| ?–1949 | Sporting Lourenço Marques | | |
| 1949–1958 | Sporting CP | 145 | (6) |

International career
| 1952–1956 | Portugal | 6 | (0) |

Managerial career
- 1961–1963: Sporting CP
- 1964–1965: Sporting CP
- 1967–1968: Vitória Guimarães
- 1969–1972: Académica
- 1973–1974: Barreirense
- 1975–1976: Sporting CP
- 1976–1979: Académica
- 1977–1978: Portugal
- 1979–1980: Belenenses
- 1980–1982: Portugal
- 1982–1983: Braga
- 1987–1989: Portugal
- * Club domestic league appearances and goals

Júlio Cernadas Pereira (13 January 1929 – 11 October 2007), commonly known as Juca, was a Portuguese football midfielder and coach. Most of his career was associated with Sporting CP, as both player and manager.

== Playing career ==
The son of Portuguese parents who had settled in Mozambique, Juca was born in Lourenço Marques, and started playing professionally with local Sporting de Lourenço Marques as a goalkeeper. In 1949 he went to Portugal and joined Sporting CP, where he remained for nine years until his retirement at the age of 29 due to a knee injury, helping them win five Primeira Liga championships and the 1954 domestic cup.

During nearly four years, Juca earned six caps for Portugal. His first game was a 1–1 draw with Austria on 23 November 1952 in a friendly match in Porto, and his last appearance was in another exhibition game, against Hungary (9 June 1956 in Lisbon, same result).

== Coaching career ==
Shortly after retiring in 1960, Juca started managing, his first job being with main club Sporting's under-19. He was promoted to head coach of the first team the following year, being in charge for three-and-a-half of the following five years and winning the 1962 and 1966 leagues (he was only in charge for four matches in the latter campaign however) as well as the 1963 Portuguese Cup.

After spending the following years with three clubs, mainly Académica de Coimbra, and some periods of inactivity, Juca returned to Sporting for 1975–76, being fired after the team could only rank in fifth position, 12 points behind champions S.L. Benfica.

In his second spell with the Coimbra side, Juca accumulated and worked for the first time as coach of the Portugal national team – in 1968 he had already worked in Otto Glória's staff– winning three games during the 1978 FIFA World Cup qualifiers and finishing second to Poland in its group, but faring worse in the 1982 edition (fourth position); both campaigns ended in failure to reach the final stages.

Juca was again in charge of the national team for the 1990 World Cup qualification, missing it by just two points in the favour of Czechoslovakia. After being dismissed he returned to Sporting, working until 2004 as director of football and youth coordinator. He died at the age of 78.

== Honours ==
=== Player ===
- Primeira Liga: 1950–51, 1951–52, 1952–53, 1953–54, 1957–58
- Taça de Portugal: 1953–54

=== Manager ===
- Primeira Liga: 1961–62, 1965–66
- Taça de Portugal: 1962–63
