= Lúcio Soares =

Portuguese footballer

Lúcio
Personal information
- Full name: Lúcio Soares
- Date of birth: 31 May 1934
- Place of birth: Manhuaçu, Brazil
- Date of death: 15 October 1974 (aged 40)
- Position: Defender

Senior career*
Years	Team	Apps	(Gls)
1959–1964	Sporting CP		

International career
1960–1962	Portugal	5	(0)
- * Club domestic league appearances and goals

Lúcio Soares (31 May 1934, in Manhuaçu – 15 October 1974) was a Portuguese footballer who played as defender.

== Football career ==
Lúcio gained 5 caps for Portugal and made his debut on 27 April 1960 in Ludwigshafen against West Germany, in a 1–2 defeat.
