= Virgílio Lopes =

Portuguese footballer

Virgílio
Personal information
- Full name: Virgílio Manuel Bagulho Lopes
- Date of birth: 27 October 1957 (age 69)
- Place of birth: Loures, Portugal
- Position: Right back

Youth career
- 1973–1975: Loures
- 1975–1976: Sporting CP

Senior career*
| Years | Team | Apps | (Gls) |
| 1976–1988 | Sporting CP | 142 | (10) |
| 1978–1981 | → Famalicão (loan) | 77 | (2) |
| 1988–1990 | Braga | 8 | (0) |
| Total | | 227 | (12) |

International career
| 1983–1985 | Portugal | 3 | (0) |
- * Club domestic league appearances and goals

Virgílio Manuel Bagulho Lopes (born 27 October 1957), known simply as Virgílio, is a Portuguese former footballer who played as a right back. He played club football for Sporting CP, Famalicão and Braga and made three appearances for his country.
