= José Pérides =

Portuguese footballer

Personal information
- Date of birth: 18 April 1935 (age 91)
- Place of birth: Tete, Mozambique
- Position: Midfielder

Senior career*
Years	Team	Apps	(Gls)
1954–1956	Académica		
1955–1960	Sporting CP		
1960–1961	Sporting Covilhã		
1961–1964	Sporting CP		
1964–1966	Benfica		
1966–1967	Sanjoanense		

International career
1961	Portugal	2	(0)
- * Club domestic league appearances and goals

José Pérides (born 18 April 1935) is a Portuguese former footballer who played as midfielder for Portuguese clubs Académica Coimbra, Sporting Portugal, Sporting Covilhã, Benfica and Sanjoanense, as well as for the Portugal national football team.

== Early life ==
José Peridis was born in 1935 in Tete, Portuguese Mozambique, son of a white Greek emigrant whose surname was Peridis. His mother was a black Mozambican woman.

== Career ==
Pérides gained 2 caps for Portugal, and made his debut on 8 October 1961 in Luxembourg City against Luxembourg, in a 4–2 defeat. He was part of the Sporting Portugal team that scored 16 goals against Cypriot team APOEL on 13 November 1963, a record in European club competitions, and would win the 1964 European Cup Winners' Cup final, in a match where Pérides also played.
