= Vítor Santos =

Portuguese footballer

Personal information
- Full name: Vítor Manuel Lopes dos Santos
- Date of birth: 1 June 1958 (age 68)
- Place of birth: Chimoio, Mozambique
- Position: Midfielder

Youth career
- 1975–1976: Lusitânia

Senior career*
Years	Team	Apps	(Gls)
1978–1980	Lusitânia		
1980–1981	Alcobaça		
1981–1989	Sporting Braga	188	(12)
1989–1990	Leixões		

International career
1983	Portugal	1	(0)
- * Club domestic league appearances and goals

Vítor Manuel Lopes dos Santos (born 1 June 1958 in Chimoio, Mozambique) is a former Portuguese footballer who played midfielder at top level for Sporting Braga, and gained 1 cap for the Portugal national team.
