= António Morato (footballer, born 1937) =

Portuguese footballer (1937–2025)

Personal information
- Full name: António Henriques Morato
- Date of birth: 20 March 1937
- Place of birth: Lisbon, Portugal
- Date of death: 19 June 2025 (aged 88)
- Place of death: Portugal
- Height: 1.72 m (5 ft 8 in)
- Position: Defender

Youth career
- 1954–1956: Sporting CP

Senior career*
Years	Team	Apps	(Gls)
1956–1965	Sporting CP	80	(0)
1963–1964	→ Vitória Setúbal (loan)	24	(1)
1965–1966	Lusitano Évora	11	(0)
1966–1967	Barreirense		
1967–1968	Oriental		
Total		115	(1)

International career
1961	Portugal	1	(0)
- * Club domestic league appearances and goals

António Henriques Morato (20 March 1937 – 19 June 2025) was a Portuguese footballer who played as a defender.

== Club career ==
Born in Lisbon, Morato spent seven seasons in the Primeira Liga with local club Sporting CP. In 1961–62, he contributed 21 appearances to help the team win the national championship, the only one of his career.

In the top division, Morato also represented Vitória de Setúbal and Lusitano de Évora. He retired in 1968, aged 31.

== International career ==
Morato's only cap for the Portugal national side arrived on 8 October 1961, in a 4–2 away loss against Luxembourg in the 1962 FIFA World Cup qualifiers.

== Personal life and death ==
Morato's son, also named António, was also an international footballer. The former died following a long illness on 19 June 2025, at the age of 88.
