= António Morato (footballer, born 1964) =

Portuguese footballer

Personal information
- Full name: António Maurício Farinha Henriques Morato
- Date of birth: 6 November 1964 (age 61)
- Place of birth: Lisbon, Portugal
- Height: 1.77 m (5 ft 10 in)
- Position: Centre-back

Youth career
- 1978–1983: Sporting CP

Senior career*
Years	Team	Apps	(Gls)
1983–1989	Sporting CP	141	(4)
1989–1990	Porto	2	(0)
1990–1991	Belenenses	35	(0)
1991–1993	Gil Vicente	38	(1)
1993	Estoril	3	(0)
1994	Fanhões	11	(0)
1995–1996	Desportivo Beja	1	(0)
Total		231	(5)

International career
1985–1990	Portugal	6	(0)
- * Club domestic league appearances and goals

António Maurício Farinha Henriques Morato (born 6 November 1964) is a Portuguese former professional footballer who played as a central defender.

== Club career ==
Relatively short for the position, Lisbon-born Morato quickly imposed himself at local Sporting CP, being an undisputed starter from the age of 19 onwards and making nearly 200 competitive appearances for the capital club before he reached 25. During his spell, he formed a pair of youth graduate stoppers with Pedro Venâncio.

Morato then moved to another Primeira Liga side in the summer of 1989, FC Porto, but his one-year stay would be not very successful. He won the only championship of his career but only appeared twice, barred by, amongst others, Belgian international Stéphane Demol.

Morato finished his professional career at only 29, after spells with C.F. Os Belenenses, Gil Vicente F.C. (two years) and G.D. Estoril Praia.

== International career ==
Morato earned six caps for Portugal, being picked for the squad at the 1986 FIFA World Cup where he was an unused substitute.

== Post-retirement ==
After retiring, Morato worked for a security company that provided services in football matches.

== Personal life ==
Morato's father, also named António, was also an international footballer.

== Honours ==
Sporting CP

- Supertaça Cândido de Oliveira: 1987

Porto

- Primeira Liga: 1989–90
