= Lito (footballer) =

Portuguese footballer

Personal information
- Full name: José Eldon de Araújo Lobo Júnior
- Date of birth: 10 August 1956 (age 70)
- Place of birth: Luanda, Angola
- Position: Winger

Youth career
- 1973–1974: Vitória Setúbal

Senior career*
Years	Team	Apps	(Gls)
1974–1977	Vitória Setúbal	49	(8)
1977–1979	Braga	56	(17)
1979–1985	Sporting CP	113	(17)
1985–1986	Braga	13	(4)
Total		231	(46)

International career
1983	Portugal	2	(0)
- * Club domestic league appearances and goals

José Eldon de Araújo Lobo Júnior (born 10 August 1956 in Luanda, Angola), known as Lito, is a Portuguese former footballer who played as a right winger.
