= 1966 FIFA World Cup knockout stage =

International football tournament stage

The knockout stage of the 1966 FIFA World Cup was the second and final stage of the competition, following the group stage. The knockout stage began on 23 July with the quarter-finals and ended on 30 July 1966 with the final match, held at Wembley Stadium in London. The top two teams from each group (eight in total) advanced to the knockout stage to compete in a single-elimination style tournament. A match for third place also was played between the two losing teams of the semi-finals.

England won the final 4–2 against West Germany for their first, and still only, World Cup title.

== Qualified teams ==
The top two placed teams from each of the four groups qualified for the knockout stage.

| Group | Winners | Runners-up |
|---|---|---|
| 1 | England | Uruguay |
| 2 | West Germany | Argentina |
| 3 | Portugal | Hungary |
| 4 | Soviet Union | North Korea |

== Bracket ==
Quarter-finals
23 July – London (Wembley)
England | 1
Argentina | 0
23 July – Liverpool
Portugal | 5
North Korea | 3
23 July – Sheffield (Hillsborough)
West Germany | 4
Uruguay | 0
23 July – Sunderland
Soviet Union | 2
Hungary | 1

Semi-finals
26 July – London (Wembley)
England | 2
Portugal | 1
25 July – Liverpool
West Germany | 2
Soviet Union | 1

Final
30 July – London (Wembley)
England (a.e.t.) | 4
West Germany | 2
Match for third place
28 July – London (Wembley)
Portugal | 2
Soviet Union | 1

== Quarter-finals ==
=== England vs Argentina ===
23 July 1966
15:00 BST

| England | 1–0 | Argentina |
|---|---|---|
| Hurst 78' |

Wembley Stadium, London
Attendance: 90,584
Referee: Rudolf Kreitlein (West Germany)

England

Argentina

| GK | 1 | Gordon Banks |
| RB | 2 | George Cohen |
| CB | 5 | Jack Charlton |
| CB | 6 | Bobby Moore (c) |
| LB | 3 | Ray Wilson |
| DM | 4 | Nobby Stiles |
| CM | 7 | Alan Ball |
| CM | 9 | Bobby Charlton |
| CM | 16 | Martin Peters |
| CF | 21 | Roger Hunt |
| CF | 10 | Geoff Hurst |
Manager:
Alf Ramsey

| GK | 1 | Antonio Roma |
| RB | 8 | Roberto Ferreiro |
| CB | 4 | Roberto Perfumo |
| CB | 12 | Rafael Albrecht |
| LB | 7 | Silvio Marzolini |
| DM | 10 | Antonio Rattín (c) | (red card) 35' |
| CM | 15 | Jorge Solari | (yellow card) 24' |
| CM | 16 | Alberto González |
| RW | 20 | Ermindo Onega |
| CF | 19 | Luis Artime | (yellow card) 45' |
| LW | 21 | Oscar Más | (yellow card) 89' |
Manager:
Juan Carlos Lorenzo

=== West Germany vs Uruguay ===
23 July 1966
15:00 BST

| West Germany | 4–0 | Uruguay |
|---|---|---|
| Haller 11', 83'; Beckenbauer 70'; Seeler 75' |

Hillsborough Stadium, Sheffield
Attendance: 40,007
Referee: Jim Finney (England)

West Germany

Uruguay

| GK | 1 | Hans Tilkowski |
| RB | 2 | Horst-Dieter Höttges |
| CB | 5 | Willi Schulz |
| CB | 6 | Wolfgang Weber | (yellow card) 86' |
| LB | 3 | Karl-Heinz Schnellinger |
| MF | 4 | Franz Beckenbauer |
| MF | 12 | Wolfgang Overath |
| RW | 8 | Helmut Haller |
| CF | 9 | Uwe Seeler (c) |
| CF | 10 | Siggi Held |
| LW | 11 | Lothar Emmerich |
Manager:
Helmut Schön

| GK | 1 | Ladislao Mazurkiewicz |
| RB | 15 | Luis Ubiña |
| CB | 3 | Jorge Manicera |
| CB | 2 | Horacio Troche (c) | (red card) 49' |
| LB | 5 | Néstor Gonçalves |
| MF | 17 | Héctor Salva | (yellow card) 86' |
| MF | 6 | Omar Caetano |
| RW | 7 | Julio César Cortés |
| CF | 19 | Héctor Silva | (yellow card) 20' | (red card) 54' |
| CF | 10 | Pedro Rocha |
| LW | 11 | Domingo Pérez |
Manager:
Ondino Viera

=== Soviet Union vs Hungary ===
23 July 1966
15:00 BST

| Soviet Union | 2–1 | Hungary |
|---|---|---|
| Chislenko 5'; Porkuyan 46' | | Bene 57' |

Roker Park, Sunderland
Attendance: 26,844
Referee: Juan Gardeazábal Garay (Spain)

Soviet Union

Hungary

| GK | 1 | Lev Yashin |
| RB | 4 | Vladimir Ponomaryov |
| CB | 6 | Albert Shesternyov (c) |
| CB | 12 | Valery Voronin |
| LB | 10 | Vasiliy Danilov |
| MF | 8 | Yozhef Sabo |
| MF | 15 | Galimzyan Khusainov |
| RW | 11 | Igor Chislenko |
| CF | 18 | Anatoliy Banishevskiy |
| CF | 19 | Eduard Malofeyev |
| LW | 17 | Valeriy Porkuyan |
Manager:
Nikolai Morozov

| GK | 21 | József Gelei |
| RB | 2 | Benő Káposzta |
| CB | 17 | Gusztáv Szepesi |
| CB | 5 | Kálmán Mészöly |
| LB | 3 | Sándor Mátrai |
| MF | 6 | Ferenc Sipos (c) |
| MF | 14 | István Nagy |
| RW | 7 | Ferenc Bene |
| CF | 9 | Flórián Albert |
| CF | 10 | János Farkas |
| LW | 11 | Gyula Rákosi |
Manager:
Lajos Baróti

=== Portugal vs North Korea ===
23 July 1966
15:00 BST

| Portugal | 5–3 | North Korea |
|---|---|---|
| Eusébio 27', 43' (pen.), 56', 59' (pen.); José Augusto 80' | | Pak Seung-zin 1'; Li Dong-woon 22'; Yang Seung-kook 25' |

Goodison Park, Liverpool
Attendance: 40,248
Referee: Menachem Ashkenazi (Israel)

Portugal

North Korea

| GK | 3 | José Pereira |
| RB | 17 | Morais |
| CB | 20 | Alexandre Baptista |
| CB | 4 | Vicente |
| LB | 9 | Hilário |
| CM | 16 | Jaime Graça |
| CM | 10 | Mário Coluna (c) | (yellow card) 41' |
| RW | 12 | José Augusto |
| SS | 13 | Eusébio |
| CF | 18 | José Torres |
| LW | 11 | António Simões |
Manager:
(Brazil) Otto Glória

| GK | 1 | Li Chan-myung |
| RB | 5 | Lim Zoong-sun |
| CB | 3 | Shin Yung-kyoo |
| CB | 14 | Ha Jung-won |
| LB | 13 | Oh Yoon-kyung |
| MF | 8 | Pak Seung-zin (c) |
| MF | 6 | Im Seung-hwi |
| RW | 11 | Han Bong-zin |
| CF | 7 | Pak Doo-ik |
| CF | 16 | Li Dong-woon |
| LW | 15 | Yang Seung-kook |
Manager:
Myung Rye-hyun

== Semi-finals ==
=== West Germany vs Soviet Union ===
25 July 1966
19:30 BST

| West Germany | 2–1 | Soviet Union |
|---|---|---|
| Haller 43'; Beckenbauer 67' | | Porkuyan 88' |

Goodison Park, Liverpool
Attendance: 38,273
Referee: Concetto Lo Bello (Italy)

West Germany

Soviet Union

| GK | 1 | Hans Tilkowski |
| RB | 14 | Friedel Lutz |
| CB | 5 | Willi Schulz |
| CB | 6 | Wolfgang Weber |
| LB | 3 | Karl-Heinz Schnellinger |
| MF | 4 | Franz Beckenbauer | (yellow card) 72' |
| MF | 8 | Helmut Haller |
| RW | 9 | Uwe Seeler (c) |
| CF | 10 | Siggi Held |
| CF | 12 | Wolfgang Overath |
| LW | 11 | Lothar Emmerich |
Manager:
Helmut Schön

| GK | 1 | Lev Yashin |
| RB | 4 | Vladimir Ponomaryov |
| CB | 6 | Albert Shesternyov (c) |
| CB | 10 | Vasiliy Danilov |
| LB | 12 | Valery Voronin | (yellow card) 20' |
| MF | 8 | Yozhef Sabo |
| MF | 15 | Galimzyan Khusainov |
| RW | 11 | Igor Chislenko | (red card) 44' |
| CF | 18 | Anatoliy Banishevskiy |
| CF | 19 | Eduard Malofeyev |
| LW | 17 | Valeriy Porkuyan |
Manager:
Nikolai Morozov

=== England vs Portugal ===
26 July 1966
19:30 BST

| England | 2–1 | Portugal |
|---|---|---|
| B. Charlton 30', 80' | | Eusébio 82' (pen.) |

Wembley Stadium, London
Attendance: 94,493
Referee: Pierre Schwinte (France)

England

Portugal

| GK | 1 | Gordon Banks |
| RB | 2 | George Cohen |
| CB | 5 | Jack Charlton |
| CB | 4 | Nobby Stiles |
| LB | 3 | Ray Wilson |
| DM | 6 | Bobby Moore (c) |
| CM | 7 | Alan Ball |
| CM | 9 | Bobby Charlton |
| CM | 16 | Martin Peters |
| CF | 21 | Roger Hunt |
| CF | 10 | Geoff Hurst |
Manager:
Alf Ramsey

| GK | 3 | José Pereira |
| RB | 22 | Alberto Festa |
| CB | 20 | Alexandre Baptista |
| CB | 21 | José Carlos |
| LB | 9 | Hilário |
| CM | 16 | Jaime Graça |
| CM | 10 | Mário Coluna (c) |
| RW | 12 | José Augusto |
| SS | 13 | Eusébio |
| CF | 18 | José Torres |
| LW | 11 | António Simões |
Manager:
(Brazil) Otto Glória

== Match for third place ==
28 July 1966
19:30 BST

| Portugal | 2–1 | Soviet Union |
|---|---|---|
| Eusébio 12' (pen.); Torres 89' | | Malofeyev 43' (Note: Goal also credited to Banishevskiy.) |

Wembley Stadium, London
Attendance: 87,696
Referee: Ken Dagnall (England)

Portugal

Soviet Union

| GK | 3 | José Pereira |
| RB | 22 | Alberto Festa |
| CB | 20 | Alexandre Baptista |
| CB | 21 | José Carlos |
| LB | 9 | Hilário |
| CM | 16 | Jaime Graça |
| CM | 10 | Mário Coluna (c) |
| RW | 12 | José Augusto |
| SS | 13 | Eusébio |
| CF | 18 | José Torres |
| LW | 11 | António Simões |
Manager:
(Brazil) Otto Glória

| GK | 1 | Lev Yashin (c) |
| RB | 4 | Vladimir Ponomaryov |
| CB | 13 | Alexey Korneyev |
| CB | 7 | Murtaz Khurtsilava |
| LB | 10 | Vasiliy Danilov |
| MF | 12 | Valery Voronin |
| MF | 14 | Georgi Sichinava |
| RW | 16 | Slava Metreveli |
| FW | 19 | Eduard Malofeyev |
| FW | 18 | Anatoliy Banishevskiy |
| LW | 2 | Viktor Serebryanikov |
Manager:
Nikolai Morozov

== Final ==
30 July 1966
15:00 BST

| England | 4–2 (a.e.t.) | West Germany |
|---|---|---|
| Hurst 18', 101', 120'; Peters 78' | | Haller 12'; Weber 89' |

Wembley Stadium, London
Attendance: 96,924
Referee: Gottfried Dienst (Switzerland)

| England | West Germany |

| GK | 1 | Gordon Banks |
| RB | 2 | George Cohen |
| CB | 5 | Jack Charlton |
| CB | 6 | Bobby Moore (c) |
| LB | 3 | Ray Wilson |
| DM | 4 | Nobby Stiles |
| CM | 7 | Alan Ball |
| CM | 9 | Bobby Charlton |
| CM | 16 | Martin Peters | (yellow card) 20' |
| CF | 21 | Roger Hunt |
| CF | 10 | Geoff Hurst |
Manager:
Alf Ramsey

| GK | 1 | Hans Tilkowski |
| SW | 5 | Willi Schulz |
| RB | 2 | Horst-Dieter Höttges |
| CB | 6 | Wolfgang Weber |
| LB | 3 | Karl-Heinz Schnellinger |
| CM | 8 | Helmut Haller |
| CM | 4 | Franz Beckenbauer |
| CM | 12 | Wolfgang Overath |
| LW | 11 | Lothar Emmerich |
| CF | 9 | Uwe Seeler (c) |
| CF | 10 | Sigfried Held |
Manager:
Helmut Schön

Officials

- Linesman: Tofiq Bahramov (Soviet Union)
- Linesman: Karol Galba (Czechoslovakia)
