= 1966 FIFA World Cup Group 3 =

1966 Football Tournament Group

Group 3 of the 1966 FIFA World Cup consisted of holders Brazil, Hungary, Portugal, and Bulgaria. Play began on 12 July 1966 and concluded on 20 July 1966. World Cup newcomers Portugal won the group, Hungary finished as runners-up, and both advanced to the quarter-finals. Meanwhile, Bulgaria and defending Champions Brazil failed to advance.

== Standings ==
Pos	Team	Pld	W	D	L	GF	GA	GR	Pts	Qualification
1	Portugal	3	3	0	0	9	2	4.500	6	Advance to knockout stage
2	Hungary	3	2	0	1	7	5	1.400	4	Advance to knockout stage
3	Brazil	3	1	0	2	4	6	0.667	2	
4	Bulgaria	3	0	0	3	1	8	0.125	0	

Source: FIFA

== Matches ==
=== Brazil vs Bulgaria ===
12 July 1966
19:30 BST

Brazil	2–0	Bulgaria
Pelé 15'; Garrincha 63'

Goodison Park, Liverpool
Attendance: 47,308
Referee: Kurt Tschenscher (West Germany)

Brazil
Bulgaria

GK	1	Gilmar
RB	2	Djalma Santos
CB	4	Bellini (c)
CB	6	Altair
LB	8	Paulo Henrique
RH	13	Denílson	(yellow card) 87'
LH	14	Lima
OR	16	Garrincha
CF	10	Pelé
CF	18	Alcindo
OL	17	Jairzinho
Manager:
Vicente Feola

GK	1	Georgi Naydenov
RB	2	Aleksandar Shalamanov
CB	5	Dimitar Penev
CB	3	Ivan Vutsov
LB	4	Boris Gaganelov (c)
RH	8	Stoyan Kitov
LH	6	Dobromir Zhechev	(yellow card) 36'
OR	7	Dinko Dermendzhiev
CF	9	Georgi Asparuhov
CF	13	Dimitar Yakimov
OL	11	Ivan Kolev	(yellow card) 66'
Manager:
(Czechoslovakia) Rudolf Vytlačil

=== Portugal vs Hungary ===
13 July 1966
19:30 BST

Portugal	3–1	Hungary
José Augusto 2', 67'; Torres 90'		Bene 60'

Old Trafford, Manchester
Attendance: 29,886
Referee: Leo Callaghan (Wales)

Portugal
Hungary

GK	2	Joaquim Carvalho
RB	17	João Morais
CB	20	Alexandre Baptista
CB	4	Vicente
LB	9	Hilário
CM	16	Jaime Graça
CM	10	Mário Coluna (c)
RW	12	José Augusto
SS	13	Eusébio
CF	18	José Torres
LW	11	António Simões
Manager:
(Brazil) Otto Glória

GK	1	Antal Szentmihályi
RB	2	Benő Káposzta
CB	3	Sándor Mátrai
CB	5	Kálmán Mészöly
LB	4	Kálmán Sóvári
MF	14	István Nagy
MF	6	Ferenc Sipos (c)
RW	7	Ferenc Bene
CF	10	János Farkas
CF	9	Flórián Albert
LW	11	Gyula Rákosi
Manager:
Lajos Baróti

=== Hungary vs Brazil ===
15 July 1966
19:30 BST

Hungary	3–1	Brazil
Bene 2'; Farkas 64'; Mészöly 73' (pen.)		Tostão 14'

Goodison Park, Liverpool
Attendance: 51,387
Referee: Ken Dagnall (England)

Hungary
Brazil

GK	21	József Gelei
RB	2	Benő Káposzta
CB	17	Gusztáv Szepesi
CB	5	Kálmán Mészöly
LB	3	Sándor Mátrai
RH	6	Ferenc Sipos (c)
LH	13	Imre Mathesz
RW	7	Ferenc Bene
CF	9	Flórián Albert
CF	10	János Farkas
LW	11	Gyula Rákosi
Manager:
Lajos Baróti

GK	1	Gilmar
RB	2	Djalma Santos
CB	4	Bellini (c)
CB	6	Altair
LB	8	Paulo Henrique
RH	11	Gérson
CM	14	Lima
LH	20	Tostão
OR	16	Garrincha
CF	18	Alcindo
OL	17	Jairzinho
Manager:
Vicente Feola

=== Portugal vs Bulgaria ===
16 July 1966
15:00 BST

Portugal	3–0	Bulgaria
Vutsov 7' (o.g.); Eusébio 38'; Torres 81'

Old Trafford, Manchester
Attendance: 25,438
Referee: José María Codensal (Uruguay)

Portugal
Bulgaria

GK	3	José Pereira
RB	22	Alberto Festa
CB	4	Vicente
CB	5	Germano (c)
LB	9	Hilário
CM	16	Jaime Graça
CM	10	Mário Coluna
RW	12	José Augusto
SS	13	Eusébio	(yellow card) 70'
CF	18	José Torres
LW	11	António Simões
Manager:
(Brazil) Otto Glória

GK	1	Georgi Naydenov
RB	2	Aleksandar Shalamanov
CB	5	Dimitar Penev
CB	3	Ivan Vutsov
LB	4	Boris Gaganelov (c)
CM	7	Dinko Dermendzhiev	(yellow card) 70'
OR	6	Dobromir Zhechev
CF	10	Petar Zhekov
CF	9	Georgi Asparuhov
CF	13	Dimitar Yakimov
OL	16	Aleksandar Kostov
Manager:
(Czechoslovakia) Rudolf Vytlačil

=== Portugal vs Brazil ===
19 July 1966
19:30 BST

Portugal	3–1	Brazil
Simões 15'; Eusébio 27', 85'		Rildo 73'

Goodison Park, Liverpool
Attendance: 58,479
Referee: George McCabe (England)

Portugal
Brazil

GK	3	José Pereira
RB	17	João Morais
CB	20	Alexandre Baptista
CB	4	Vicente
LB	9	Hilário
CM	16	Jaime Graça
CM	10	Mário Coluna (c)
RW	12	José Augusto
SS	13	Eusébio
CF	18	José Torres
LW	11	António Simões
Manager:
(Brazil) Otto Glória

GK	12	Manga
RB	3	Fidélis
CB	5	Brito
CB	7	Orlando (c)
LB	9	Rildo
RH	13	Denílson
LH	14	Lima
OR	17	Jairzinho
CF	10	Pelé
CF	19	Silva Batuta
OL	21	Paraná
Manager:
Vicente Feola

=== Hungary vs Bulgaria ===
20 July 1966
19:30 BST

Hungary	3–1	Bulgaria
Davidov 43' (o.g.) (Note: Also credited to Vutsov own goal.); Mészöly 45'; Bene 54'		Asparuhov 15'

Old Trafford, Manchester
Attendance: 24,129
Referee: Roberto Goicoechea (Argentina)

Hungary
Bulgaria

GK	21	József Gelei
RB	2	Benő Káposzta
CB	17	Gusztáv Szepesi
CB	5	Kálmán Mészöly
LB	3	Sándor Mátrai
RH	6	Ferenc Sipos (c)
LH	13	Imre Mathesz
RW	7	Ferenc Bene
CF	9	Flórián Albert
CF	10	János Farkas
LW	11	Gyula Rákosi
Manager:
Lajos Baróti

GK	21	Simeon Simeonov
RB	15	Dimitar Largov
CB	5	Dimitar Penev
CB	3	Ivan Vutsov
LB	4	Boris Gaganelov (c)
CM	20	Ivan Davidov
OR	6	Dobromir Zhechev
CF	14	Nikola Kotkov
CF	9	Georgi Asparuhov
CF	13	Dimitar Yakimov
OL	11	Ivan Kolev
Manager:
(Czechoslovakia) Rudolf Vytlačil

== See also ==
- Brazil at the FIFA World Cup
- Bulgaria at the FIFA World Cup
- Hungary at the FIFA World Cup
- Portugal at the FIFA World Cup
