= Os Magriços =

Portuguese team at the 1966 FIFA World Cup

Os Magriços was the nickname of the Portugal national football team which finished third at the 1966 FIFA World Cup in England. The team were based on the Benfica team that won two consecutive European Cups in 1961 and 1962, which included Mário Coluna, Eusébio, José Augusto, José Augusto Torres and António Simões. They were selected by Manuel da Luz Afonso and coached by Otto Glória. The nickname is derived from a 15th-century Portuguese chivalric legend - The Twelve of England (Portuguese: Os Doze de Inglaterra). It was made famous by the poet Luís de Camões in his 1572 Os Lusíadas. It tells the story of twelve Portuguese knights who travelled to England at the request of twelve English women to avenge their insult by a group of English knights. One of these Portuguese knights, Álvaro Gonçalves Coutinho, was nicknamed O Magriço.

== Team ==
Head coach: (Brazil) Otto Glória

No.	Pos.	Player	Date of birth (age)	Club
1	GK	Américo	6 March 1933 (aged 33)	(Portuguese Football Federation) Porto
2	GK	Joaquim Carvalho	18 April 1937 (aged 29)	(Portuguese Football Federation) Sporting CP
3	GK	José Pereira	15 September 1931 (aged 34)	(Portuguese Football Federation) Belenenses
4	DF	Vicente	24 September 1935 (aged 30)	(Portuguese Football Federation) Belenenses
5	DF	Germano	18 January 1933 (aged 33)	(Portuguese Football Federation) Benfica
6	MF	Fernando Peres	8 January 1942 (aged 24)	(Portuguese Football Federation) Sporting CP
7	FW	Ernesto Figueiredo	6 July 1937 (aged 29)	(Portuguese Football Federation) Sporting CP
8	FW	João Lourenço	8 April 1942 (aged 24)	(Portuguese Football Federation) Sporting CP
9	MF	Hilário	19 March 1939 (aged 27)	(Portuguese Football Federation) Sporting CP
10	MF	Mário Coluna (captain)	6 August 1935 (aged 30)	(Portuguese Football Federation) Benfica
11	MF	António Simões	14 December 1943 (aged 22)	(Portuguese Football Federation) Benfica
12	MF	José Augusto	13 April 1937 (aged 29)	(Portuguese Football Federation) Benfica
13	FW	Eusébio	25 January 1942 (aged 24)	(Portuguese Football Federation) Benfica
14	MF	Fernando Cruz	12 August 1940 (aged 25)	(Portuguese Football Federation) Benfica
15	FW	Manuel Duarte	20 May 1943 (aged 23)	(Portuguese Football Federation) Leixões
16	MF	Jaime Graça	10 January 1942 (aged 24)	(Portuguese Football Federation) Vitória Setúbal
17	DF	João Morais	6 March 1935 (aged 31)	(Portuguese Football Federation) Sporting CP
18	FW	José Torres	8 September 1938 (aged 27)	(Portuguese Football Federation) Benfica
19	MF	Custódio Pinto	9 February 1942 (aged 24)	(Portuguese Football Federation) Porto
20	DF	Alexandre Baptista	17 February 1941 (aged 25)	(Portuguese Football Federation) Sporting CP
21	DF	José Carlos	22 September 1941 (aged 24)	(Portuguese Football Federation) Sporting CP
22	DF	Alberto Festa	21 July 1939 (aged 26)	(Portuguese Football Federation) Porto
