= Cabrita =

Cabrita is a surname. Notable people with the surname include:

- Cabrita (footballer), full name Jorge Soares Marins (born 1939), Brazilian footballer
- Augusto Cabrita (1923–1993), Portuguese photographer, cinematographer and film director
- Barbara Cabrita (born 1982), French-Portuguese actress
- Eduardo Cabrita (born 1961), Portuguese politician
- Fernando Cabrita (1923–2014), Portuguese football forward and manager
- Pedro Cabrita Reis (born 1956), Portuguese artist

== See also ==
- The Battle of Cabrita Point, was a naval battle that took place while a combined Spanish-French force besieged Gibraltar on 10 March 1705 during the War of Spanish Succession
