= José Carlos (footballer, born 1941) =

Portuguese footballer (1941–2025)

Personal information
- Full name: José Carlos da Silva José
- Date of birth: 22 September 1941
- Place of birth: Vila Franca de Xira, Portugal
- Date of death: 26 April 2025 (aged 83)
- Place of death: Torres Vedras, Portugal
- Height: 1.75 m (5 ft 9 in)
- Position: Defender

Youth career
- CUF

Senior career*
Years	Team	Apps	(Gls)
1960–1962	CUF	51	(1)
1962–1974	Sporting CP	248	(3)
1974–1975	Braga		
Total		299	(4)

International career
1961–1971	Portugal	36	(0)

Managerial career
- 1975: Oriental
- 1975–1976: Braga
- 1978: Boavista
- 1980–1981: Varzim
- 1981–1982: Chaves
- 1982–1984: Águeda
- 1984–1985: Gil Vicente
- 1985–1986: União Santarém
- 1986–1988: Gil Vicente
- 1988–1989: Paredes
- 1989–1990: Fafe
- 1990–1992: Valpaços
- 1993–1994: Lanheses
- 1995: Penafiel
- 1996–2001: Dragões Sandinenses
- 2004–2005: Lourinhanense
Medal record
Men's football
Representing Portugal
FIFA World Cup
Third place	1966 England
- * Club domestic league appearances and goals

José Carlos da Silva José (22 September 1941 – 26 April 2025), known as José Carlos, was a Portuguese footballer who played mostly as a central defender.

== Club career ==
Born in Vila Franca de Xira, Lisbon District, José Carlos joined Sporting CP in 1962 from G.D. Fabril in Barreiro. Over 12 seasons, all spent in the Primeira Liga (14 counting those with his previous team), he appeared in 348 official matches and also acted as captain, winning three leagues and four Taça de Portugal and adding the 1964 edition of the UEFA Cup Winners' Cup.

José Carlos retired in 1975 at the age of 34, following a brief spell in the Segunda Liga with S.C. Braga where he achieved promotion. Shortly after the 1966 FIFA World Cup, Sporting rejected an offer from La Liga club FC Barcelona to acquire his services.

== International career ==
José Carlos played 36 times for Portugal, three as a CUF player and 33 whilst at the service of Sporting. His debut came on 19 March 1961 against Luxembourg in the 1962 FIFA World Cup qualifiers (6–0 home win), and his last appearance came nearly ten years later, against Denmark in the UEFA Euro 1972 qualifying stages (5–0 victory).

José Carlos represented the country at the 1966 World Cup in England. He appeared twice in the tournament, against England in the semi-finals and the Soviet Union in the third-place match, the latter ending in a 2–1 triumph.

== Death ==
José Carlos died on 26 April 2025, at the age of 83.

== Honours ==
Sporting CP

- Primeira Liga: 1965–66, 1969–70, 1973–74
- Taça de Portugal: 1962–63, 1970–71, 1972–73, 1973–74
- UEFA Cup Winners' Cup: 1963–64

Portugal

- FIFA World Cup third place: 1966
