= Viktor Bondarenko (footballer) =

Russian footballer (born 1949)

Personal information
- Full name: Viktor Ivanovich Bondarenko
- Date of birth: 13 June 1949 (age 77)
- Height: 1.78 m (5 ft 10 in)
- Positions: Defender; striker

Senior career*
Years	Team	Apps	(Gls)
1968–1974	SKA Rostov-on-Don	132	(15)
1975	Lokomotiv Moscow	0	(0)
1975	Rostselmash	29	(3)
1976	Daugava Rīga	38	(8)
1977–1979	SKA Rostov-on-Don	108	(13)
1980	Rostselmash	30	(4)

Managerial career
- 1983–1985: SKA Rostov-on-Don (assistant)
- 1985–1988: Matchedje Nampula
- 1989: SKA Rostov-on-Don (director)
- 1991: SKA Rostov-on-Don
- Matchedje Nampula
- Costa do Sol
- Mozambique
- 1995–1996: Orlando Pirates
- Moroka Swallows
- Bush Bucks
- Mamelodi Sundowns
- 2004: Dynamo Moscow (assistant)
- 2004: Dynamo Moscow
- 2005: Ismaily
- 2006: SKA Rostov-on-Don
- 2009: Primeiro de Agosto
- 2010: Kabuscorp
- 2011–2012: Kabuscorp
- * Club domestic league appearances and goals

Viktor Ivanovich Bondarenko (Russian: Виктор Иванович Бондаренко; born 13 June 1949) is a Russian professional football coach and a former player who is mostly known for coaching in Africa for many years. He coached Mozambique twice. In 2009, he managed Primeiro de Agosto, but was fired in July.
