= Vladimir Ponomaryov =

Vladimir Ponomaryov may refer to:

- Vladimir Ponomaryov (footballer, born 1940) (Vladimir Alekseyevich Ponomaryov), Soviet international footballer
- Vladimir Ponomaryov (footballer, born 1987) (Vladimir Sergeyevich Ponomaryov), Russian footballer
- Vladimir Ponomaryov (actor), see Qumi-Qumi
- Vladimir Ponomaryov (runner) (born 1952), Soviet Olympic middle-distance runner
