= 1966 São Paulo FC season =

São Paulo
1966 season
- Chairman: Laudo Natel
- Manager: Aymoré Moreira
- Torneio Rio-São Paulo: Runners-up
- Campeonato Paulista: 5th

The 1966 football season was São Paulo's 37th season since club's existence.

== Overall ==
Games played	52 (9 Torneio Rio-São Paulo, 28 Campeonato Paulista, 15 Friendly match)
Games won	23 (5 Torneio Rio-São Paulo, 12 Campeonato Paulista, 6 Friendly match)
Games drawn	15 (0 Torneio Rio-São Paulo, 10 Campeonato Paulista, 5 Friendly match)
Games lost	14 (4 Torneio Rio-São Paulo, 6 Campeonato Paulista, 4 Friendly match)
Goals scored	93
Goals conceded	66
Goal difference	+27
Best result	5–0 (A) v Ituveravense - Friendly match - 1966.04.21
Worst result	0–3 (A) v Palmeiras - Campeonato Paulista - 1966.12.15
Most appearances	
Top scorer	

Source: São Paulo FC

== Friendlies ==
January 15 National	Londrina	0–4	São Paulo	Londrina
			Goal	Stadium: Estádio Vitorino Gonçalves Dias

January 26 National	São José	1–2	São Paulo	São José dos Campos
	Goal		Goal

January 30 National	Francana	2–2	São Paulo	Franca
	Goal		Goal	Stadium: Estádio Palmeiras Futebol Clube

February 6 National	Ponte Preta	1–1	São Paulo	Campinas
	Goal		Goal	Stadium: Estádio Moisés Lucarelli

March 30 National	Ferroviário-PR	1–4	São Paulo	Curitiba
	Goal		Goal	Stadium: Estádio Durival Britto e Silva (Vila Capanema)

April 16 National	Atlético Mineiro	1–1	São Paulo	Belo Horizonte
	Goal		Goal	Stadium: Estádio Governador Magalhães Pinto (Mineirão)

April 21 National	Ituveravense	0–5	São Paulo	Ituverava
			Goal

June 9 National	Internacional	0–0	São Paulo	Porto Alegre
				Stadium: Estádio Ildo Meneghetti (dos Eucaliptos)

June 12 National	Grêmio	2–1	São Paulo	Porto Alegre
	Goal		Goal	Stadium: Estádio Olímpico Monumental

October 4 National	Ferroviário (Araçatuba)	0–2	São Paulo	Araçatuba
			Goal

=== Torneio Laudo Natel ===
June 26 National	São Paulo	1–2	Corinthians	São Paulo
	Goal		Goal	Stadium: Estádio Cícero Pompeu de Toledo (Morumbi)

June 29 National	São Paulo	3–4	Portuguesa	São Paulo
	Goal		Goal	Stadium: Estádio Municipal Paulo Machado de Carvalho (Pacaembu)

July 6 National	Portuguesa	2–1	São Paulo	São Paulo
	Goal		Goal	Stadium: Estádio Municipal Paulo Machado de Carvalho (Pacaembu)

July 10 National	Corinthians	4–4	São Paulo	São Paulo
	Goal		Goal	Stadium: Estádio Municipal Paulo Machado de Carvalho (Pacaembu)

== Official competitions ==
=== Torneio Rio-São Paulo ===
February 9 1	Fluminense	1–3	São Paulo	Rio de Janeiro
	Amoroso		Valdir Birigui; Valdir Birigui; Prado	Stadium: Estádio Vasco da Gama (São Januário)

February 13 2	São Paulo	2–0	Flamengo	São Paulo
	Prado; Benê			Stadium: Estádio Cícero Pompeu de Toledo (Morumbi)

February 19 3	Portuguesa	1–0	São Paulo	São Paulo
	Sílvio			Stadium: Estádio Municipal Paulo Machado de Carvalho (Pacaembu)

February 26 4	São Paulo	3–2	Santos	São Paulo
	Benê; Fefeu; Valdir Birigui		Toninho Guerreiro; Toninho Guerreiro	Stadium: Estádio Municipal Paulo Machado de Carvalho (Pacaembu)

March 5 5	São Paulo	1–2	Botafogo	São Paulo
	Faustino		Parada; Jairzinho	Stadium: Estádio Municipal Paulo Machado de Carvalho (Pacaembu)

March 9 6	Vasco da Gama	1–0	São Paulo	Rio de Janeiro
	Célio			Stadium: Estádio Jornalista Mário Filho (Maracanã)

March 12 7	São Paulo	1–0	Bangu	São Paulo
	Fefeu			Stadium: Estádio Municipal Paulo Machado de Carvalho (Pacaembu)

March 19 8	Corinthians	2–0	São Paulo	São Paulo
	Garrincha Tales			Stadium: Estádio Municipal Paulo Machado de Carvalho (Pacaembu)

March 26 9	São Paulo	4–2	Palmeiras	São Paulo
	Babá; Benê; Prado; Fefeu		Ademar Pantera; Ademir da Guia	Stadium: Estádio Municipal Paulo Machado de Carvalho (Pacaembu)

==== Record ====
Final Position	Points	Matches	Wins	Draws	Losses	Goals For	Goals Away	Win%
2nd	10	9	5	0	4	14	11	55%

=== Campeonato Paulista ===
July 31 1	São Paulo	4–2	Noroeste	São Paulo
	Goal		Goal	Stadium: Estádio Cícero Pompeu de Toledo (Morumbi)

August 7 2	São Paulo	1–1	Juventus	São Paulo
	Goal		Goal	Stadium: Estádio Municipal Paulo Machado de Carvalho (Pacaembu)

August 14 3	Prudentina	1–1	São Paulo	Presidente Prudente
	Goal		Goal	Stadium: Estádio Félix Ribeiro Marcondes

August 21 4	São Bento	0–1	São Paulo	Sorocaba
			Goal	Stadium: Estádio Humberto Reale

August 28 5	América	0–1	São Paulo	São José do Rio Preto
			Goal	Stadium: Estádio Mário Alves de Mendonça

September 4 6	São Paulo	3–0	Comercial	São Paulo
	Goal			Stadium: Estádio Cícero Pompeu de Toledo (Morumbi)

September 7 7	Bragantino	0–1	São Paulo	Bragança Paulista
			Goal	Stadium: Estádio Marcelo Stéfani

September 10 8	São Paulo	2–0	Guarani	São Paulo
	Goal			Stadium: Estádio Cícero Pompeu de Toledo (Morumbi)

September 15 9	Portuguesa Santista	1–1	São Paulo	Santos
	Goal		Goal	Stadium: Estádio Ulrico Mursa

September 18 10	Corinthians	0–3	São Paulo	São Paulo
			Goal	Stadium: Estádio Municipal Paulo Machado de Carvalho (Pacaembu)

September 21 11	Botafogo	2–4	São Paulo	Ribeirão Preto
	Goal		Goal	Stadium: Estádio Luís Pereira (Vila Tibério)

September 28 12	Santos	1–0	São Paulo	Santos
	Goal			Stadium: Estádio Urbano Caldeira (Vila Belmiro)

October 9 13	São Paulo	2–4	Palmeiras	São Paulo
	Goal		Goal	Stadium: Estádio Cícero Pompeu de Toledo (Morumbi)

October 12 14	São Paulo	0–2	Portuguesa	São Paulo
			Goal	Stadium: Estádio Municipal Paulo Machado de Carvalho (Pacaembu)

October 15 15	São Paulo	3–4	América	São Paulo
	Goal		Goal	Stadium: Estádio Cícero Pompeu de Toledo (Morumbi)

October 20 16	Juventus	0–0	São Paulo	São Paulo
				Stadium: Estádio Municipal Paulo Machado de Carvalho (Pacaembu)

October 23 17	São Paulo	3–2	Bragantino	São Paulo
	Goal		Goal	Stadium: Estádio Cícero Pompeu de Toledo (Morumbi)

October 30 18	São Paulo	2–1	Santos	São Paulo
	Goal		Goal	Stadium: Estádio Cícero Pompeu de Toledo (Morumbi)

November 6 19	Comercial	2–2	São Paulo	Ribeirão Preto
	Goal		Goal	Stadium: Estádio Doutor Francisco de Palma Travassos

November 10 20	São Paulo	3–1	Portuguesa Santista	São Paulo
	Goal		Goal	Stadium: Estádio Municipal Paulo Machado de Carvalho (Pacaembu)

November 16 21	São Paulo	2–2	Prudentina	São Paulo
	Goal		Goal	Stadium: Estádio Municipal Paulo Machado de Carvalho (Pacaembu)

November 20 22	Guarani	0–0	São Paulo	Campinas
				Stadium: Estádio Brinco de Ouro da Princesa

November 24 23	Portuguesa	1–0	São Paulo	São Paulo
	Goal			Stadium: Estádio Municipal Paulo Machado de Carvalho (Pacaembu)

November 27 24	Noroeste	1–1	São Paulo	Bauru
	Goal		Goal	Stadium: Estádio Dr. Alfredo de Castilho

December 1 25	São Paulo	2–2	Botafogo	São Paulo
	Goal		Goal	Stadium: Estádio Municipal Paulo Machado de Carvalho (Pacaembu)

December 4 26	São Paulo	2–1	Corinthians	São Paulo
	Goal		Goal	Stadium: Estádio Municipal Paulo Machado de Carvalho (Pacaembu)

December 10 27	São Paulo	1–1	São Bento	São Paulo
	Goal		Goal	Stadium: Estádio Municipal Paulo Machado de Carvalho (Pacaembu)

December 15 28	Palmeiras	3–0	São Paulo	São Paulo
	Goal			Stadium: Estádio Municipal Paulo Machado de Carvalho (Pacaembu)

==== Record ====
Final Position	Points	Matches	Wins	Draws	Losses	Goals For	Goals Away	Win%
5th	34	28	12	10	6	45	35	60%
