= Hilário (footballer, born 1939) =

Portuguese footballer (born 1939)

Personal information
- Full name: Hilário Rosário da Conceição
- Date of birth: 19 June 1939 (age 87)
- Place of birth: Lourenço Marques, Mozambique
- Height: 1.75 m (5 ft 9 in)
- Position: Left-back

Youth career
- 1953–1956: Atlético Lourenço Marques
- 1956–1957: Sporting Lourenço Marques

Senior career*
Years	Team	Apps	(Gls)
1958	Sporting Lourenço Marques		
1958–1973	Sporting CP	331	(1)

International career
1959–1971	Portugal	40	(0)

Managerial career
- 1973–1974: Sporting CP (assistant)
- 1974–1975: Braga
- 1975–1976: Marítimo
- 1976–1977: Sanjoanense
- 1977: Braga
- 1979–1980: Braga
- 1980–1981: Leixões
- 1981: Águeda
- 1981–1982: Covilhã
- 1982–1983: Académico Viseu
- 1983–1984: Tirsense
- 1984–1987: Lusitânia
- 1987–1988: Praiense
- 1989: Ferroviário
- 1990–1991: Matchedje
- 1992–1993: Maxaquene
- 1994–1997: Sporting CP (assistant)
- 2003–2004: Sporting CP B (assistant)
Medal record
Men's football
Representing Portugal
FIFA World Cup
Third place	1966
- * Club domestic league appearances and goals

Hilário Rosário da Conceição, OM (born 19 June 1939), known as Hilário (Portuguese pronunciation: [iˈlaɾiu]), is a Portuguese former footballer who played as a left-back.

He spent his entire professional career with Sporting CP, appearing in 474 competitive matches (a record that stood for several decades) and winning seven major trophies.

An international for 12 years, Hilário represented Portugal at the 1966 FIFA World Cup.

== Club career ==
Born in Lourenço Marques, Portuguese Mozambique, Hilário was first noticed at Sporting de Lourenço Marques, an official branch of Sporting CP, as Eusébio, three years his junior and a childhood friend. He put his youth career on hold for nearly two years and switched to basketball, as he often played football barefoot due to the fact he did not feel comfortable wearing cleats.

After signing for Sporting in 1958, Hilário was an undisputed starter for 14 of his 15 Primeira Divisão seasons, winning three national championships and as many Taça de Portugal. He missed the club's conquest of the 1963–64 European Cup Winners' Cup, due to a serious tibia injury contracted against Vitória de Setúbal just three days before the final against MTK Budapest FC in Brussels. Following a replay in Antwerp, the trophy was taken by the whole team to his house where he was recovering; prior to that second match, he sent a telegram from the hospital to his teammates: "Fight until the end, I have you in my heart." A photo of him with his leg still in a cast and drinking champagne from the trophy became famous.

Hilário retired aged 34, and embarked on a managerial career shortly after. This included his only spells in the Portuguese top division, with S.C. Braga in the 1976–77 and the 1979–80 seasons, and assistant stints with Sporting (both first and reserve teams).

=== Eusébio transfer saga ===
Following the arrival of Eusébio to Lisbon in December 1960, Hilário tried to talk him into joining him at Sporting, as the former was poised to sign for S.L. Benfica. On behalf of Sporting, Hilário offered him an improved professional contract instead of the initial arrangement of a trial period. Sporting's offer was the double of Benfica's, included the necessary funds to allow financial compensation for the incurred costs, and according to Hilário he was successful in that endeavour.

Benfica found this meeting suspicious, and in order to avoid the advances of Sporting towards Eusébio instructed him to be codenamed Ruth Malosso, moved him on 8 April 1961 to a holiday home owned by former chairman Domingos Claudino and a hotel near the Meia Praia beach in Lagos, Algarve, where he would remain for twelve days until the transfer upheaval subsided, and he finally signed and was registered.

== International career ==
On 11 November 1959, Hilário made his debut for the Portugal national team, in a 5–3 friendly loss to France. He went on earn a further 39 caps, his last appearance coming on 17 February 1971 in a 3–0 defeat against Belgium in UEFA Euro 1972 qualifying.

Hilário was called up for the 1966 FIFA World Cup by manager Otto Glória, featuring in all the matches for the third-placed side.

== Honours ==
Sporting CP

- Primeira Divisão: 1961–62, 1965–66, 1969–70
- Taça de Portugal: 1962–63, 1970–71, 1972–73
- European Cup Winners' Cup: 1963–64

Portugal

- FIFA World Cup third place: 1966
