= Joaquim Carvalho (footballer) =

Portuguese footballer (1937–2022)

Personal information
- Full name: Joaquim da Silva Carvalho
- Date of birth: 18 April 1937
- Place of birth: Barreiro, Portugal
- Date of death: 5 April 2022 (aged 84)
- Place of death: Portugal
- Height: 1.80 m (5 ft 11 in)
- Position: Goalkeeper

Senior career*
Years	Team	Apps	(Gls)
1955–1958	Luso Barreiro		
1958–1970	Sporting CP	152	(0)
1970–1972	Atlético	16	(0)
Total		168	(0)

International career
1965–1966	Portugal	6	(0)
Medal record
Men's football
Representing Portugal
FIFA World Cup
Third place	1966 England
- * Club domestic league appearances and goals

Joaquim da Silva Carvalho (18 April 1937 – 5 April 2022) was a Portuguese footballer who played as a goalkeeper.

== Club career ==
Born in Barreiro, Setúbal District, Carvalho started playing football with local Luso Futebol Clube, transferring in 1958 to Sporting CP where he remained the following 12 years, winning five major titles. He was in goal as the Lisbon side defeated MTK Budapest to conquer the 1963–64 edition of the UEFA Cup Winners' Cup.

Carvalho appeared in 251 matches with his main club, friendlies included. He retired in 1972 at the age of 35 after a spell with neighbouring Atlético Clube de Portugal, subsequently returning to Sporting as a goalkeeper coach.

== International career ==
Carvalho played six times with the Portugal national team, making his debut on 31 October 1965 in a 0–0 draw with Czechoslovakia in the 1966 FIFA World Cup qualifying campaign. Selected for the finals in England, he featured in the opener against Hungary (3–1 win in Manchester) but lost his place to C.F. Os Belenenses' José Pereira for the remainder of the tournament, with the country finishing in third place.

== Death ==
Carvalho died on 5 April 2022, thirteen days shy of his 85th birthday.

== Honours ==
Sporting CP

- Primeira Liga: 1961–62, 1965–66, 1969–70
- Taça de Portugal: 1962–63
- UEFA Cup Winners' Cup: 1963–64

Portugal

- FIFA World Cup third place: 1966
