= Alexandre Baptista =

Portuguese footballer (1941–2024)

Personal information
- Full name: José Alexandre da Silva Baptista
- Date of birth: 17 February 1941
- Place of birth: Barreiro, Portugal
- Date of death: 3 March 2024 (aged 83)
- Place of death: Lisbon, Portugal
- Height: 1.78 m (5 ft 10 in)
- Position: Defender

Youth career
- Sporting CP

Senior career*
Years	Team	Apps	(Gls)
1960–1971	Sporting CP	94	(2)

International career
1964–1969	Portugal	11	(0)
Medal record
Men's football
Representing Portugal
FIFA World Cup
Third place	1966 England
- * Club domestic league appearances and goals

José Alexandre da Silva Baptista (17 February 1941 – 3 March 2024) was a Portuguese footballer who played as a defender.

== Club career ==
Born in Barreiro, Setúbal District, Baptista played his entire professional career, which spanned 11 years, with Sporting CP, winning five major titles while being first choice in four of those. He took the pitch as the Lisbon side defeated MTK Budapest to conquer the 1963–64 edition of the UEFA Cup Winners' Cup.

Baptista retired from the game at the end of the 1970–71 season, aged just 30. He remained connected to his only club, in directorial capacities.

== International career ==
Baptista earned 11 caps for Portugal, making his debut in the Taça das Nações match against England on 4 June 1964. He participated at the 1966 FIFA World Cup finals, playing five matches for the third-placed team.

== Personal life and death ==
Whilst still an active player, Baptista majored in economics, going on to act as commercial director for several companies.

He died on 3 March 2024, at the age of 83. Sporting issued a note of condolence, praising and thanking him for his years of effort and dedication to the club.

== Honours ==
Sporting CP

- Primeira Liga: 1965–66, 1969–70
- Taça de Portugal: 1962–63, 1970–71
- UEFA Cup Winners' Cup: 1963–64

Portugal

- FIFA World Cup third place: 1966

== See also ==
- List of one-club men
