= 1966 in Brazilian football =

Football in Brazil
- Season: 1966

The following article presents a summary of the 1966 football (soccer) season in Brazil, which was the 65th season of competitive football in the country.

== Taça Brasil ==
Semifinals

Team #1	Agg	Team #2	1st leg	2nd leg	3rd leg
Náutico	6-9	Santos	0-2	5-3	1-4
Cruzeiro	4-1	Fluminense	1-0	3-1	-

Final

November 30, 1966

Cruzeiro	6–2	Santos

December 7, 1966

Santos	2–3	Cruzeiro

Cruzeiro declared as the Taça Brasil champions by aggregate score of 9–4.

== Torneio Rio-São Paulo ==
Position	Team	Points	Played	Won	Drawn	Lost	For	Against	Difference
1	Botafogo	11	9	4	3	2	19	11	8
2	Santos	11	9	4	3	2	18	11	7
3	Vasco da Gama	11	9	5	1	3	12	11	1
4	Corinthians	11	9	5	1	3	15	15	0
5	São Paulo	10	9	5	0	4	14	11	3
6	Palmeiras	9	9	4	1	4	11	13	-2
7	Flamengo	8	9	3	2	4	13	13	0
8	Bangu	8	9	4	0	5	9	12	-3
9	Fluminense	6	9	3	0	6	8	17	-9
10	Portuguesa	5	9	2	1	6	11	16	-5

The final stage of the competition, played in a round-robin format between the four best placed teams in the first stage was not played, as the teams did not want to field reserve players, and the national team was preparing for the World Cup. Thus, the four best placed teams, which are Botafogo, Santos, Vasco da Gama and Corinthians, were declared as Torneio Rio-São Paulo champions.

== State championship champions ==
State	Champion	State	Champion
Acre	Juventus-AC	Pará	Paysandu
Alagoas	CSA	Paraíba	Treze
Amapá	Juventus-AP	Paraná	Ferroviário-PR
Amazonas	São Raimundo	Pernambuco	Náutico
Bahia	Leônico	Piauí	Piauí
Ceará	América-CE	Rio de Janeiro	Goytacaz
Distrito Federal	Rabello	Rio Grande do Norte	ABC
Espírito Santo	Rio Branco-ES	Rio Grande do Sul	Grêmio
Goiás	Goiás	Rondônia	Flamengo-RO
Guanabara	Bangu	Roraima	-
Maranhão	Moto Club	Santa Catarina	Perdigão
Mato Grosso	Dom Bosco	São Paulo	Palmeiras
Mato Grosso do Sul	-	Sergipe	América-SE
Minas Gerais	Cruzeiro	Tocantins	-

== Brazilian clubs in international competitions ==
Team	Copa Libertadores 1966
Santos	Withdrew
Vasco	Withdrew

== Brazil national team ==
The following table lists all the games played by the Brazil national football team in official competitions and friendly matches during 1966.

Date	Opposition	Result	Score	Brazil scorers	Competition
April 17, 1966	Chile	W	1-0	João Carlos Severiano	Bernardo O'Higgins Cup
April 20, 1966	Chile	L	1-2	João Carlos Severiano	Bernardo O'Higgins Cup
May 1, 1966	Rio Grande do Sul State Combined Team	W	2-0	Servílio, Gérson	International Friendly (unofficial match)
May 14, 1966	Wales	W	3-1	Silva, Servílio, Garrincha	International Friendly
May 15, 1966	Chile	D	1-1	Rinaldo	International Friendly
May 18, 1966	Wales	W	1-0	Lima	International Friendly
May 19, 1966	Chile	W	1-0	Gérson	International Friendly
June 4, 1966	Peru	W	4-0	Lima (2), Pelé, Paraná	International Friendly
June 5, 1966	Poland	W	4-1	Tostão (2), Alcindo, Denílson	International Friendly
June 8, 1966	Peru	W	3-1	Fidélis, Tostão, Edu	International Friendly
June 8, 1966	Poland	W	2-1	Silva, Garrincha	International Friendly
June 12, 1966	Czechoslovakia	W	2-1	Pelé (2)	International Friendly
June 15, 1966	Czechoslovakia	D	2-2	Pelé, Zito	International Friendly
June 21, 1966	(Spain) Atlético Madrid	W	5-3	Pelé (3), Lima, Amarildo	International Friendly (unofficial match)
June 25, 1966	Scotland	D	1-1	Servílio	International Friendly
June 27, 1966	(Sweden) Åtvidaberg	W	8-2	Silva (3), Denílson (2), Dino Sani (2), Tostão	International Friendly (unofficial match)
June 30, 1966	Sweden	W	3-2	Tostão (2), Gérson	International Friendly
July 4, 1966	(Sweden) AIK	W	4-2	Pelé (2), Garrincha, Lima	International Friendly (unofficial match)
July 6, 1966	(Sweden) Malmö	W	3-1	Pelé (2), Jairzinho	International Friendly (unofficial match)
July 12, 1966	Bulgaria	W	2-0	Pelé, Garrincha	World Cup
July 15, 1966	Hungary	L	1-3	Tostão	World Cup
July 19, 1966	Portugal	L	1-3	Rildo	World Cup
