= Vasiliy Danilov =

Russian and Soviet footballer

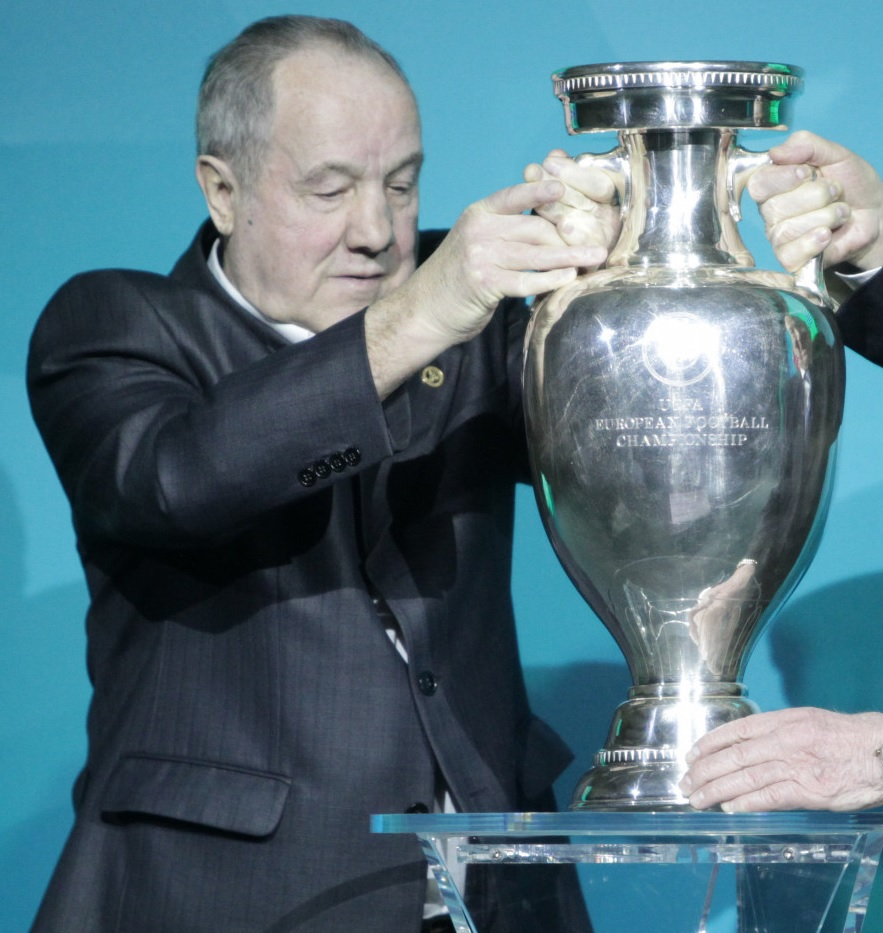
- Danilov in 2017

Personal information
- Full name: Vasiliy Savelievich Danilov
- Date of birth: May 13, 1941 (age 85)
- Place of birth: Maly Prisynok, Voronezh Oblast, Russian SFSR
- Height: 1.72 m (5 ft 7 1/2 in)
- Position: Defender

Youth career
- Oruzheyny Zavod Tula

Senior career*
Years	Team	Apps	(Gls)
1960	FC Shakhtyor Stalinogorsk	20	(0)
1961–1968	FC Zenit Leningrad	162	(5)
1969	FC Lokomotiv Moscow	12	(0)
1970	FC Dynamo Leningrad	9	(0)
1972–1973	FC Elektron Novgorod		

International career
1965–1967	USSR	23	(0)
- * Club domestic league appearances and goals

Vasiliy Savelievich Danilov (Russian: Василий Савельевич Данилов; born 13 May 1941) is a former Russian and Soviet footballer.

== Career ==
He capped 23 times for USSR, playing the 1966 FIFA World Cup.
