= Maly Prisynok =

Maly Prisynok Малый Присынок
- Settlement
- Location within Belgorod Oblast Location within Russia
- Coordinates: 51°11′N 38°08′E
- Country: Russia
- Region: Belgorod Oblast
- District: Starooskolsky District
- Time zone: UTC+3:00

Maly Prisynok (Russian: Малый Присынок) is a rural locality (a settlement) in Starooskolsky District, Belgorod Oblast, Russia. The population was 50 as of 2010. There are 3 streets.

== Geography ==
Maly Prisynok is located 33 km southeast of Stary Oskol (the district's administrative centre) by road. Ternovoye is the nearest rural locality.
