= Augusto Cabrita =

Portuguese film director and photographer (1923-1993)

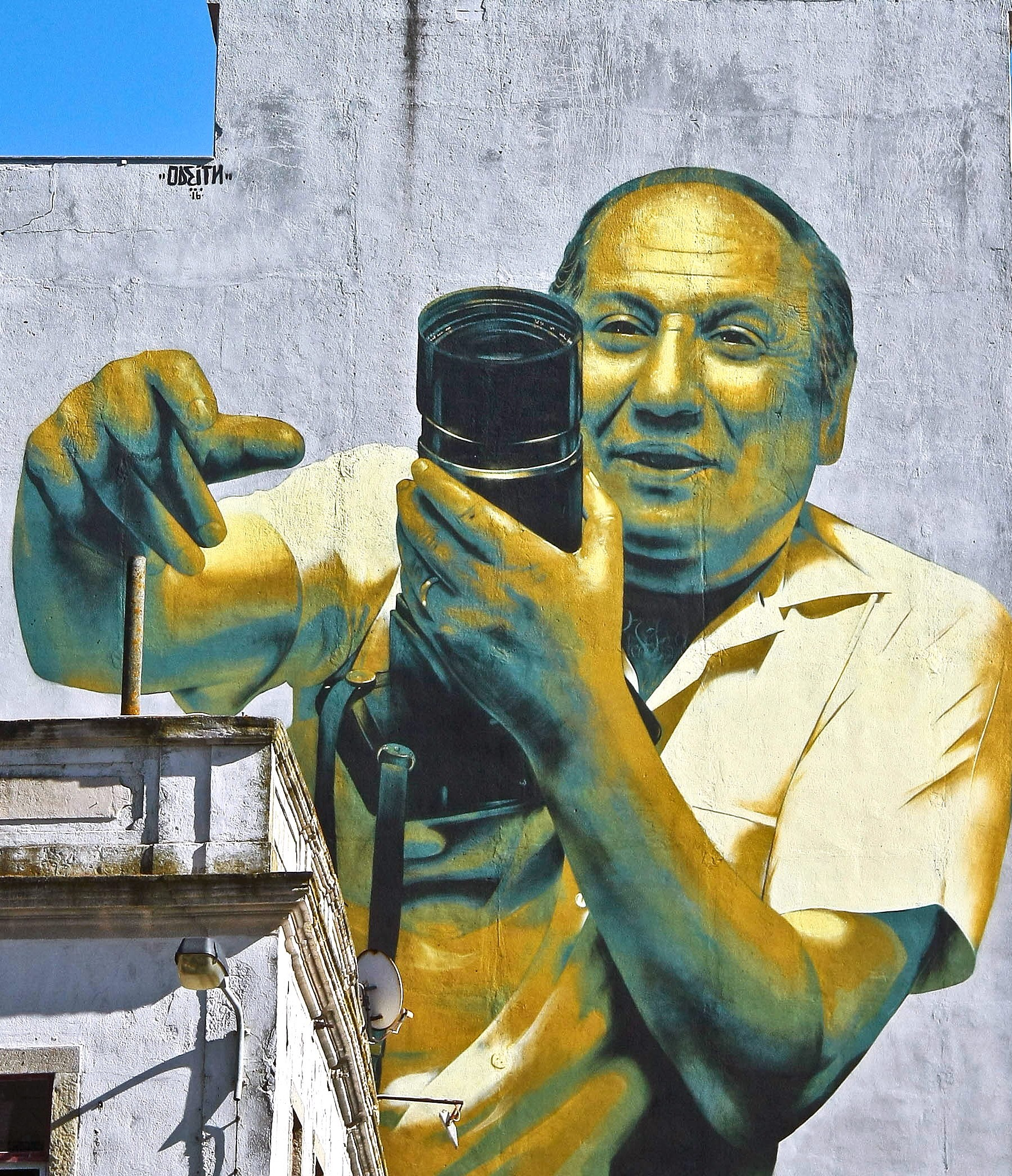
- Born: March 16, 1923; Barreiro, Portugal
- Died: February 1, 1993 (aged 69); Lisbon, Portugal
- Occupations: Photographer, cinematographer, filmmaker.

Augusto Cabrita (March 16, 1923 – February 1, 1993) was a Portuguese photographer, cinematographer and film director. He is best known as a leading name in photography in Portugal.

== Career ==
Cabrita was a self-taught photographer. He worked as a photojournalist for the weekly O Século and their magazine O Século Ilustrado, from Lisbon. He also did the covers of albums by musicians like Amália Rodrigues, Carlos Paredes, Luís Goes and Simone de Oliveira. He directed many short film documentaries and was the cinematographer of Belarmino (1964), by Fernando Lopes, one of the first and most important films of the Portuguese Cinema Novo (New Cinema).

He was the photographer of several books about Portuguese patrimony, on subjects like cuisine, Portuguese religious architecture, castles and natural parks and reservations.

Cabrita’s name was given to a secondary school and to the municipal auditorium in his home city of Barreiro.

== Filmography ==
=== Short films ===
(selection)

- Improviso Sobre o Algarve (1960)
- Macau (1961)
- Viana e o Seu Termo (1969)
- Na Corrente (1970)
- A Viagem (1970)
- O Mar Transporta a Cidade (1977)
- Uma História de Comboios - Uma Viagem de Hans-Christian Andersen (1978)
- Lisboa (1979)
- Açores, Ilhas do Atlântico (1979)

== Books ==
- 50 Anos da CUF no Barreiro (1958-1959)
- Portugal, Um País que Importa Conhecer (1972)
- Cozinha Tradicional Portuguesa (1982), by Maria de Lurdes Modesto, with António Homem Cardoso
- "New You Rhapsody"(1983) with Guta de Carvalho
- As Mais Belas Vilas e Aldeias de Portugal (1984), by Júlio Gil
- Os Mais Belos Castelos e Fortalezas de Portugal (1986), by Júlio Gil
- Parques e Reservas Naturais de Portugal (1990), by Pedro de Castro Henriques, with additional photography by Rui Cunha
- Amália: Uma Estranha Forma de Vida (1992), by Vítor Pavão dos Santos
- Os Mais Belos Rios de Portugal (1994), by João Conde Veiga
