= Denílson (footballer, born 1943) =

Brazilian footballer (1943–2024)

Personal information
- Full name: Denílson Custódio Machado
- Date of birth: 28 March 1943
- Place of birth: Campos dos Goytacazes, Rio Janeiro, Brazil
- Date of death: 1 October 2024 (aged 81)
- Place of death: Rio de Janeiro, Brazil
- Position: Midfielder

Senior career*
Years	Team	Apps	(Gls)
1961–1963	Madureira		
1964–1973	Fluminense		
1973–1974	Rio Negro		
1975	Vitória		

International career
1966–1968	Brazil	9	(1)

Managerial career
- 1978–1977: Vitória
- 1986: Goytacaz
- * Club domestic league appearances and goals

Denílson Custódio Machado (28 March 1943 – 1 October 2024), best known as Denílson, was a Brazilian footballer who played as a midfielder.

He played his entire career (1962–1974) at Fluminense, and won four Rio de Janeiro State Championships (1964, 1969, 1971, 1973), and three Guanabara Rio Cups (1966, 1969, 1971).

At the international level, he made nine appearances for the Brazil national team, scoring one goal, and participated at the 1966 FIFA World Cup, making two appearances against Bulgaria and Portugal.

He was known as the 'king of step-overs'.

== Death ==
Denilson died in Rio de Janeiro on 1 October 2024, at the age of 81.

== Honours ==
Fluminense

- Campeonato Brasileiro Série A: 1970
- Campeonato Carioca: 1964, 1969, 1971, 1973
