= Gusztáv Szepesi =

Hungarian footballer (1939–1987)

Personal information
- Date of birth: 17 July 1939
- Place of birth: Miskolc, Hungary
- Date of death: 5 June 1987 (aged 47)
- Place of death: Tatabánya, Hungary
- Height: 1.78 m (5 ft 10 in)
- Position: Defender

Senior career*
| Years | Team | Apps | (Gls) |
| 1959–1969 | FC Tatabánya | | |

International career
| 1965–1966 | Hungary | 5 | (0) |
Medal record
Men's football
Representing Hungary
Olympic Games
| Gold medal – first place | 1964 Tokyo | Team competition |
- * Club domestic league appearances and goals

Gusztáv Szepesi, nicknamed Gusztav Szedunka (17 July 1939 – 5 June 1987) was a Hungarian football defender who played for Hungary in the 1966 FIFA World Cup. He also played for FC Tatabánya.
