= Vladimir Ponomaryov (footballer, born 1940) =

Soviet footballer

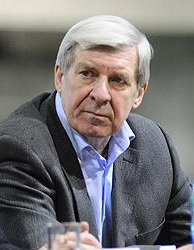
- Ponomaryov in 2010

Personal information
- Full name: Vladimir Alekseyevich Ponomaryov
- Date of birth: 18 February 1940 (age 86)
- Place of birth: Moscow, USSR
- Height: 1.84 m (6 ft 1/2 in)
- Positions: Defender; forward

Youth career
- FC Dynamo Moscow

Senior career*
| Years | Team | Apps | (Gls) |
| 1958–1960 | FC Dynamo Moscow | 0 | (0) |
| 1960–1961 | Volga Kalinin | | |
| 1962–1969 | CSKA Moscow | 113 | (1) |

International career
| 1964–1966 | USSR | 25 | (0) |

Managerial career
- 1991–1993: FC Zenit Chelyabinsk (assistant)
- * Club domestic league appearances and goals

Vladimir Alekseyevich Ponomaryov (Russian: Владимир Алексеевич Пономарёв; born 18 February 1940) is a retired Soviet football player who played as a defender or forward.

== International career ==
Ponomaryov made his debut for USSR on 11 October 1964 in a friendly against Austria. He played at the 1966 FIFA World Cup, where USSR made it to the semi-finals.
