= Matchedje Nampula =

- Full name: Matchedje Nampula
- Ground: Matchedje Arena; Nampula, Mozambique
- Capacity: 10.000
- League: Mocambola3
- 2006: 16

Matchedje Nampula, usually known simply as Matchedje Nampula, is a traditional football (soccer) club based in Nampula, Mozambique.

== Stadium ==
The club plays its home matches at Matchedje Arena, which has a maximum capacity of 10,000 people.
