= Barreiro, Portugal =

Barreiro
- Municipality
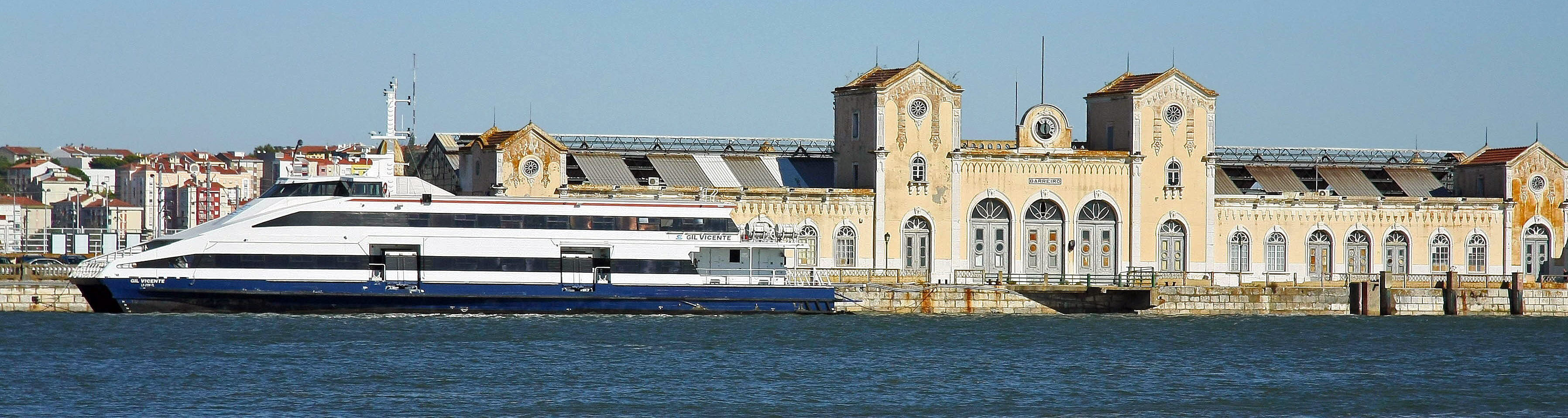
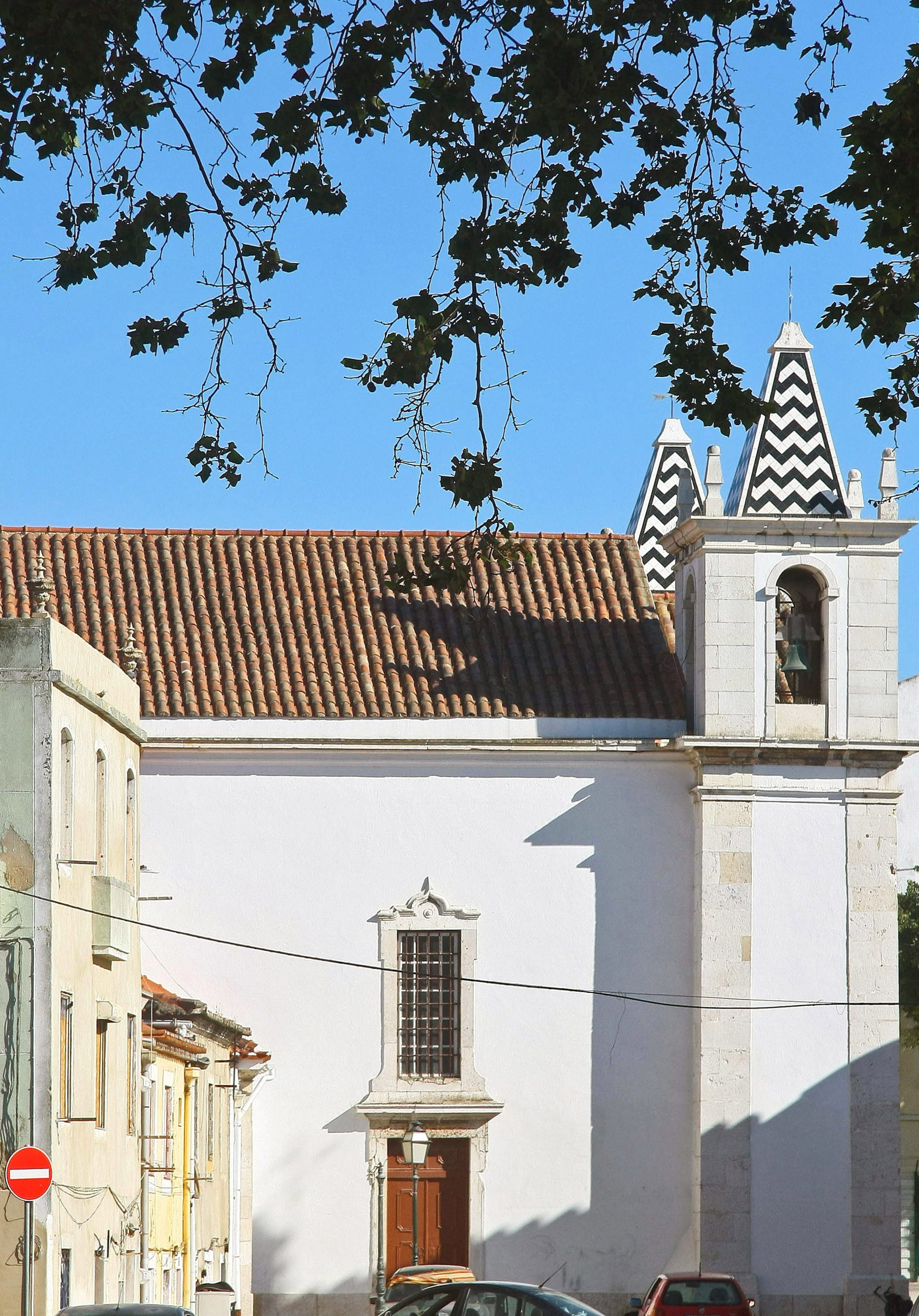
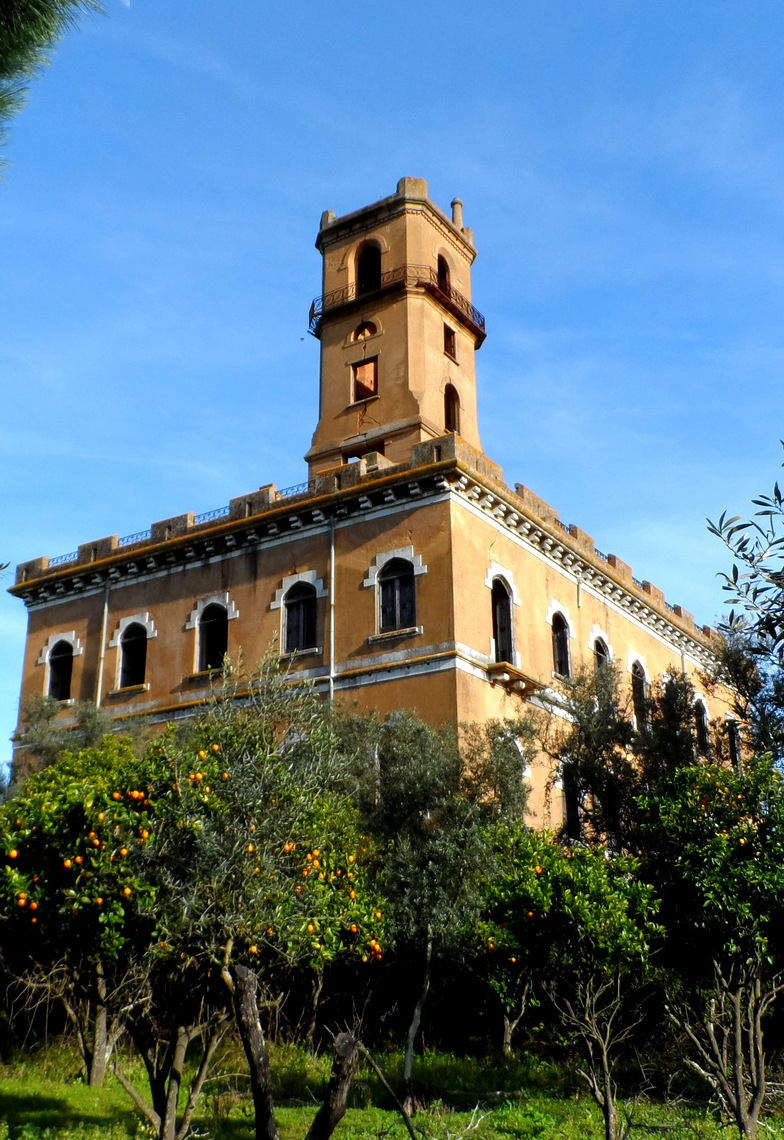
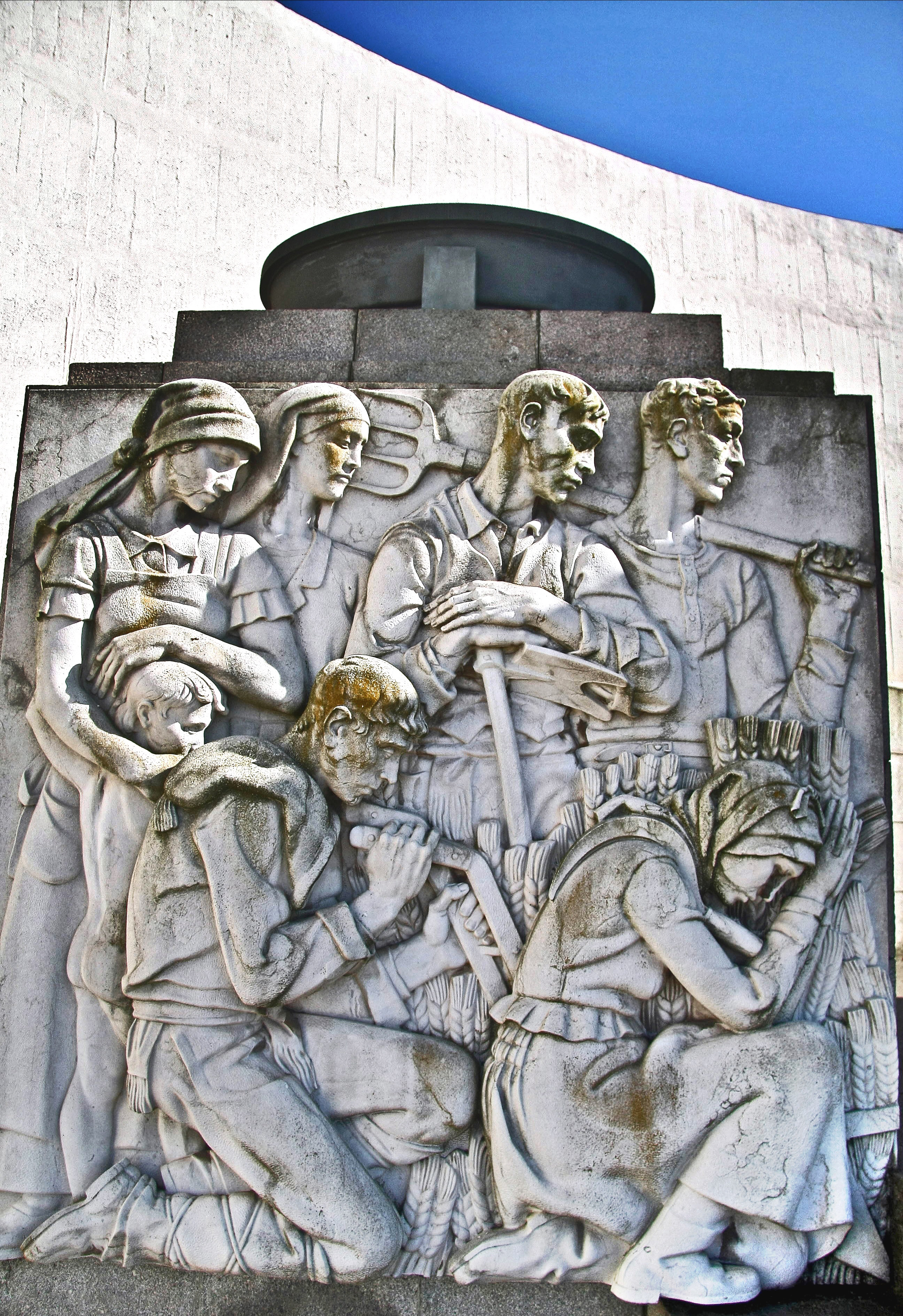
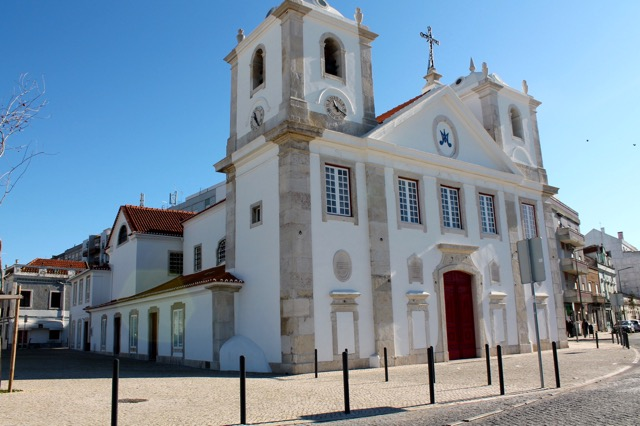
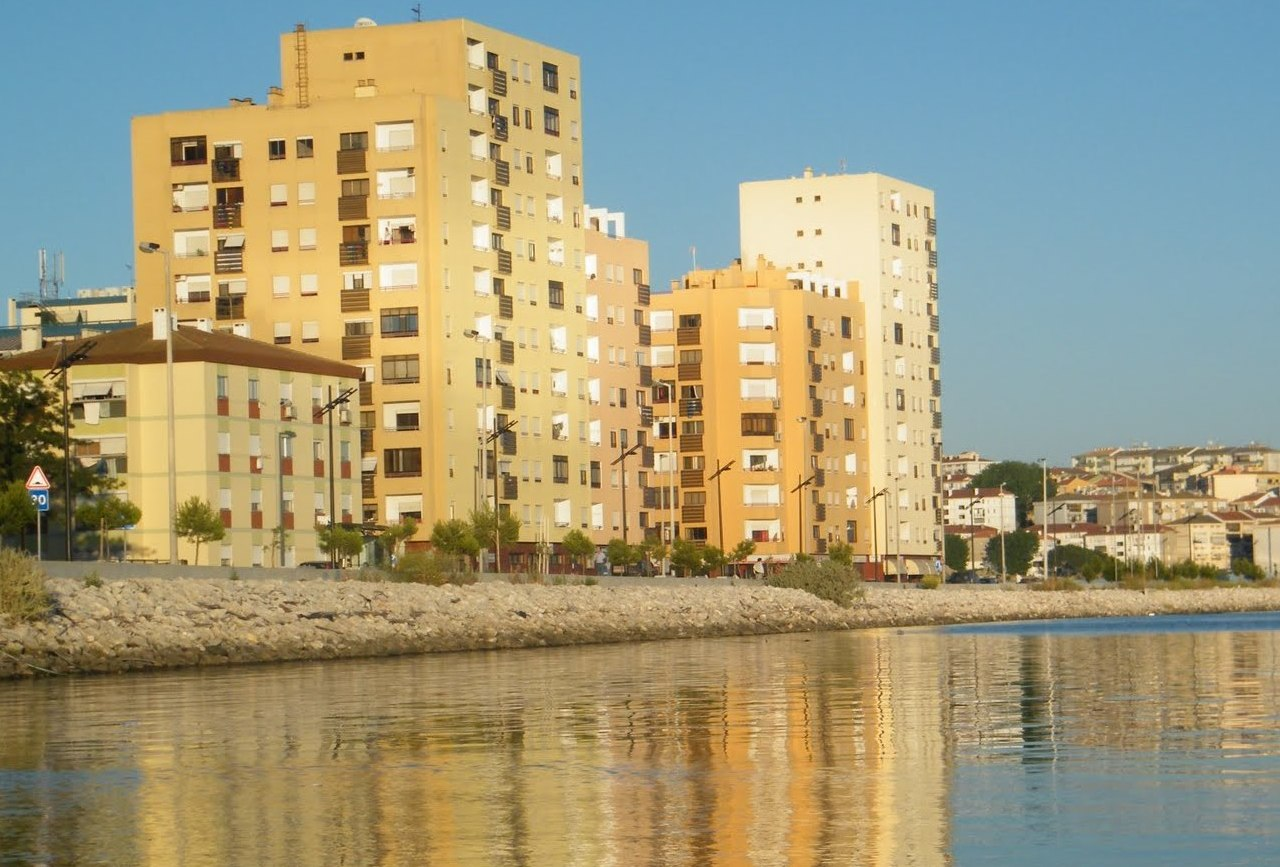

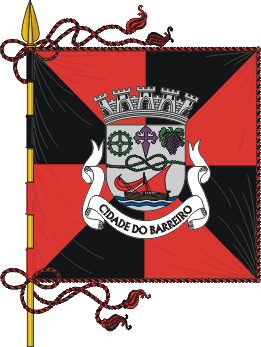
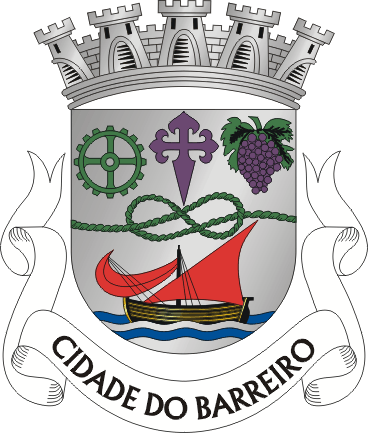
- Flag Coat of arms
- Interactive map of Barreiro
- Location in Portugal
- Coordinates: 38°40′N 09°04′W
- Country: Portugal
- Region: Lisbon
- Metropolitan area: Lisbon
- District: Setúbal
- Parishes: 8

Government
  - President: Frederico Rosa (PS)

Area
  - Total: 36.39 km^{2} (14.05 sq mi)

Population (2021)
  - Total: 78,345
  - Density: 2,153/km^{2} (5,576/sq mi)
- Time zone: UTC+00:00 (WET)
  - Summer (DST): UTC+01:00 (WEST)
- Local holiday: June 28
- Website: www.cm-barreiro.pt

Barreiro (European Portuguese pronunciation: [bɐˈʁɐjɾu]) is a city and a municipality in the Setúbal District in Portugal. The population in 2021 was 78,345, in an area of 36.39 square kilometres (14.05 mi^{2}). It is a region belonging to the Lisbon Metropolitan Area.

Barreiro has a view of the city of Lisbon from Avenida da Praia and a riverside area called Alburrica.

The mayor since 2017 has been Frederico Rosa, elected by the Socialist Party. The municipal holiday is June 28.

== History ==
There are records of the village of Barreiro from as far as the 13th century, when the Military Order of Saint James of the Sword promoted its settlement. Due to the village's location, the main occupation of the population was harvesting salt and fishing.

By the time the Portuguese reached India and Brazil (early 16th century), it was in Barreiro that shipbuilding was concluded, since it started in Lisbon during summer and when the rougher weather arrived the construction had to be moved to somewhere with more sheltered conditions. It was also in Barreiro that the bread for the ships' crew was baked. These activities put Barreiro on the map and in 1521 the village became a town.

In the 19th century, the railway lines from Setúbal and Vendas Novas were extended to Barreiro, which along with the location by the Tagus made CUF select the town for the establishment of one of the biggest industrial estates of its time. Quickly, thousands of people from all over the country arrived looking for work; a substantial number of people migrated to Barreiro from the region of Alentejo, where rural workers had very few rights (work from sunrise to sunset and child labour were still normalised) but which was now well connected to Barreiro via the railway.

After the revolution that overthrew a 41 years long dictatorship, many factories were nationalised all over the country and so was the industrial estate in Barreiro. Without the former regime to restrict imports and control the national production, the business started to decline and the factories in Barreiro were gradually shut down.

Also with the fall of the dictatorship, Portugal withdrew from the overseas territories and gave them their independence back. After the change in political powers abroad, thousands migrated to Portugal in order to flee violence; at this time Barreiro received many refugees, mostly from Portuguese and Angolan ethnic backgrounds. In autumn 1975 The New York Times profiled Barreiro as a "new home for refugees from Angola".

Due to its industrial past, Barreiro residents have historically elected representatives from the Portuguese Communist Party in all local elections since the revolution (1976, 1979, 1982, 1985, 1989, 1993, 1997, 2005, 2009 and 2013) except from the elections in 2001, 2017 and 2021, won by the candidates from the Socialist Party.

In 1984 Barreiro became a city.

== Population ==
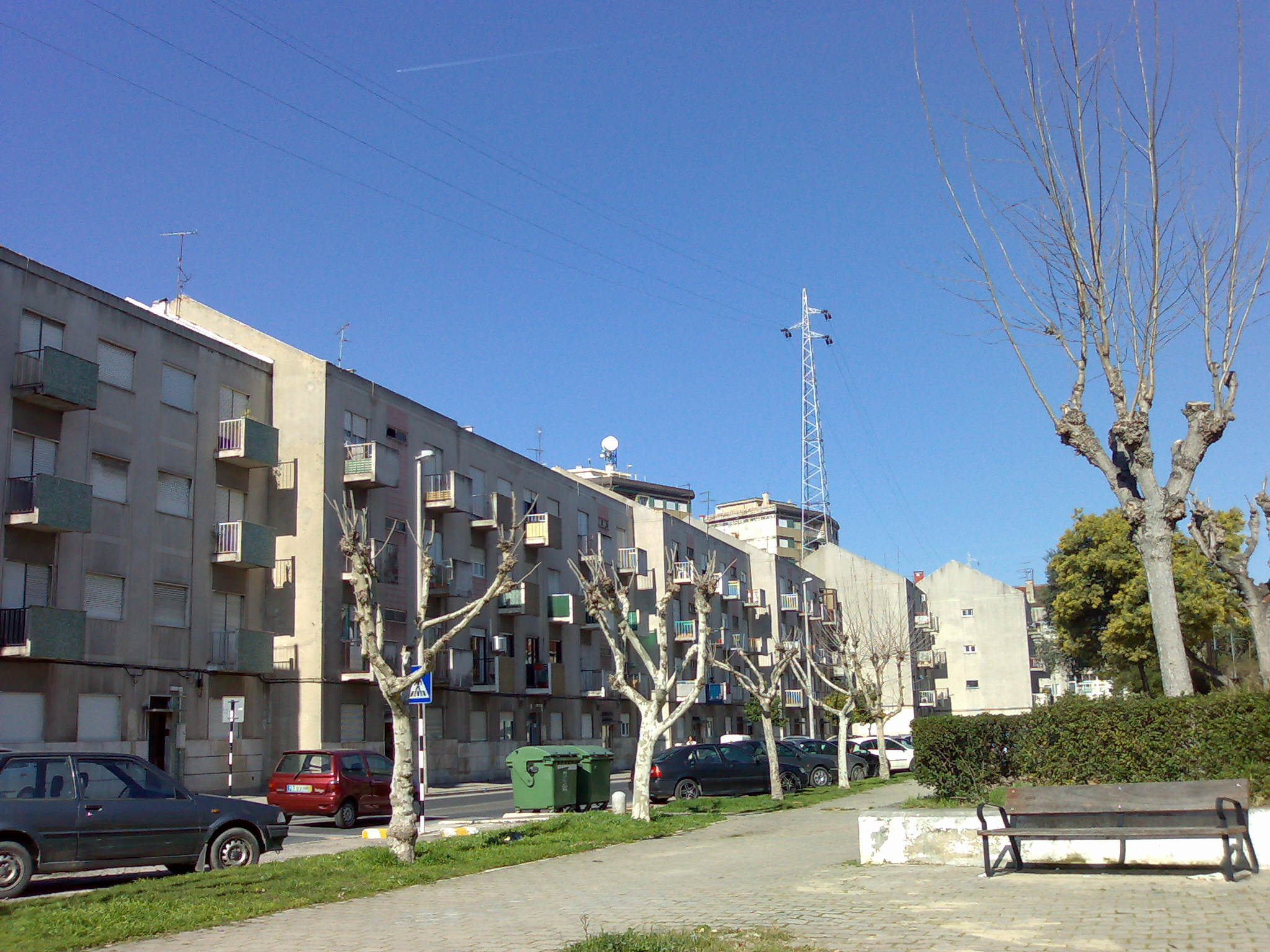
Street in Barreiro

Population growth (1801–2011)
| 1801 | 1849 | 1900 | 1930 | 1960 | 1981 | 1991 | 2001 | 2004 | 2011 | 2021 |
| 2 425 | 3 384 | 7 738 | 21 030 | 35 088 | 88 052 | 85 768 | 79 012 | 78 992 | 78 764 | 78 345 |

== Parishes ==
Administratively, the municipality is divided into 4 civil parishes (freguesias):

- Alto do Seixalinho, Santo André e Verderena
- Barreiro e Lavradio
- Palhais e Coina
- Santo António da Charneca

== Sports ==
- F.C. Barreirense is the local team and plays at Campo da Verderena. G.D. Fabril, another local team, plays at Complexo Desportivo Alfredo da Silva.

== Notable people ==
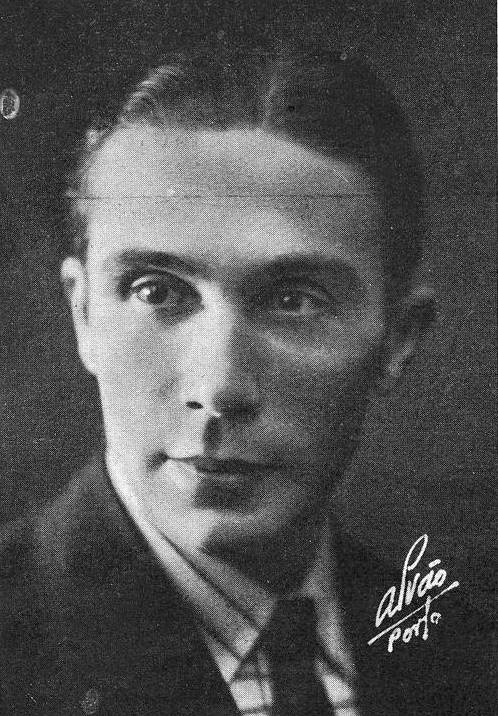
Henrique Galvão, 1934

- Álvaro Velho (15th-16th century) sailor or soldier, accompanied Vasco da Gama on the first Portuguese expedition by sea to India in 1497
- Henrique Galvão (1895–1970) military officer, writer and politician
- Augusto Cabrita (1923–1993) photographer, cinematographer and film director
- Isabel do Carmo (born 1940) doctor, writer, former university professor and political activist
- Maria Guinot (1945–2018) singer, sang in the 1984 Eurovision Song Contest
- Eduardo Cabrita (born 1961) legal professional and politician
- Heloísa Apolónia (born 1969) Portuguese Green politician and jurist
- Leonor Andrade (born 1994) singer and actress, represented Portugal at the Eurovision Song Contest 2015.

=== Sport ===
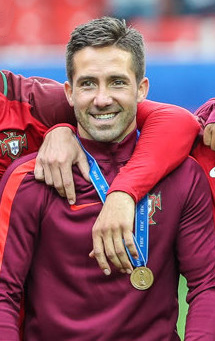
João Moutinho, 2017

- Manuel Vasques (1926–2003) footballer with 280 club caps and 26 with Portugal
- José Augusto (born 1937) footballer with over 344 club caps and 45 with Portugal
- Joaquim Carvalho (1937–2022) former footballer with 168 club caps and 6 with Portugal
- Fernando Chalana (1959–2022) footballer with over 270 club caps and 27 with Portugal
- Paulo Fonseca (born 1973) former footballer, currently a club manager
- Nuno Espírito Santo (born 1974 in São Tomé), brought up in Barreiro, started youth football in 1985 with the Barreiro teams Santoantoniense and G.D. Fabril.
- Paulo Jorge Camões Martins (born 1983) known as Paulinho futsal player with 76 caps with the Portugal national futsal team
- João Moutinho (born 1986) footballer with over 500 club caps and 134 for Portugal
- Bruno Martins Indi (born 1992) Dutch footballer with over 200 club appearances 34 with the Netherlands; was born in Barreiro to Bissau-Guinean parents
- João Cancelo (born 1994) Portuguese footballer with over 300 club appearances and 48 Caps with Portugal
- Neemias Queta (born 1999) basketball player at Sacramento Kings and the first Portuguese player to be drafted and play in the NBA. NBA champion with Boston Celtics 2024

== International relations ==
Barreiro is twinned with:

- — Łódź in Poland (since 1996)
- — Stara Zagora in Bulgaria (since 1976)

== See also ==
- Barreiro railway station
