= József Gelei =

Hungarian footballer and manager (born 1938)

Personal information
- Date of birth: 29 June 1938 (age 88)
- Place of birth: Kunmadaras, Hungary
- Height: 1.79 m (5 ft 10 1/2 in)
- Position: Goalkeeper

Youth career
- 1950–1954: MTK
- 1954–1957: Beloiannisz

Senior career*
| Years | Team | Apps | (Gls) |
| 1957–1961 | MTK | ? | (?) |
| 1961–1962 | Vasas SC | ? | (?) |
| 1962–1967 | Tatabánya | ? | (?) |
| Total | | ? | (?) |

International career
| 1963–1964 | Hungary Olympic | 10 | (0) |
| 1965–1966 | Hungary | 11 | (0) |

Managerial career
- 1970–1975: Tatabánya
- 1990–1991: India
Medal record
Men's football
Representing Hungary
Olympic Games
| Gold medal – first place | 1964 Tokyo | Team competition |
- * Club domestic league appearances and goals

József Gelei (born 29 June 1938) is a Hungarian former professional football player and manager.

== Career ==
=== Playing career ===
Gelei, who played as a goalkeeper, played youth football with MTK and Beloiannisz, before turning professional in 1957 with former club MTK. He also played club football with Vasas SC and Tatabánya.

Gelei also played at international level for Hungary, representing them at the 1964 Summer Olympics, 1964 European Nation's Cup and the 1966 FIFA World Cup.

=== Coaching career ===
After retiring as a player, Gelei trained as a football coach, and managed a number of club sides in Hungary. He also coached the India national team.
