= Vicente Lucas =

Portuguese footballer (1935–2026)

Vicente
Personal information
- Full name: Vicente da Fonseca Lucas
- Date of birth: 24 September 1935
- Place of birth: Lourenço Marques, Mozambique
- Date of death: 14 April 2026 (aged 90)
- Place of death: Lisbon, Portugal
- Position: Centre-back

Senior career*
Years	Team	Apps	(Gls)
1954–1967	Belenenses	286	(12)

International career
1959–1966	Portugal	20	(0)

Managerial career
- 1979−1980: Amiense
- 1980−1981: Sesimbra
- 1990: Belenenses
Medal record
Men's football
Representing Portugal
FIFA World Cup
Third place	1966 England
- * Club domestic league appearances and goals

Vicente da Fonseca Lucas (24 September 1935 – 14 April 2026), known simply as Vicente, was a Portuguese footballer who played as a central defender.

== Playing career ==
Born in Lourenço Marques, Portuguese Mozambique, Vicente spent 13 seasons in the Primeira Liga with C.F. Os Belenenses, making his debut in 1954 and winning the Taça de Portugal six years later. He earned 20 caps for Portugal, his debut coming on 3 June 1959 in a 1–0 win against Scotland.

Vicente was picked for the squad that appeared in the 1966 FIFA World Cup in England. As his team went on to finish in third position, he played all the group stage matches plus the 5–3 quarter-final win against North Korea; he was accused of fouling Pelé in the 3–1 group phase victory over Brazil, when it was in fact his teammate João Morais who was responsible.

Vicente quit football after the World Cup due to a serious eye injury after he was hit by a piece of glass in a car accident, aged 31. He was remembered for several perfect markings of the best players of his time without making any foul, and was cited by Pelé as the greatest defender that he ever played against.

== Coaching career ==
From 1979 to 1981, Vicente coached in the fourth division, spending one season apiece with Clube Desportivo Amiense and G.D. Sesimbra. In 1990–91, he was one of four managers as his beloved Belenenses could not avoid top-flight relegation – he was in charge for only one game, a 2–1 defeat.

== Personal life and death ==
Vicente's older brother, Sebastião, was also a footballer. A striker, he played 13 years with Belenenses (sharing teams with his sibling during ten), and also represented the Portugal national team.

Vicente died in Lisbon on 14 April 2026, at the age of 90.

== See also ==
- List of one-club men
