= Alberto Festa =

Portuguese footballer (1939–2024)

Personal information
- Full name: Alberto Augusto Antunes Festa
- Date of birth: 21 July 1939
- Place of birth: Santo Tirso, Portugal
- Date of death: 2 January 2024 (aged 84)
- Place of death: Portugal
- Height: 1.77 m (5 ft 10 in)
- Position: Right-back

Senior career*
Years	Team	Apps	(Gls)
1955–1960	Tirsense		
1960–1968	Porto	114	(0)
1968–1972	Tirsense	29	(1)
Total		143	(1)

International career
1963–1966	Portugal	19	(0)
Medal record
Men's football
Representing Portugal
FIFA World Cup
Third place	1966 England
- * Club domestic league appearances and goals

Alberto Augusto Antunes Festa (21 July 1939 – 2 January 2024) was a Portuguese footballer who played as a right-back.

== Club career ==
Born in Santo Tirso, Porto District, Festa started and finished his 17-year senior career with local club F.C. Tirsense. In between, he represented FC Porto, where he appeared in 114 Primeira Liga matches.

Festa retired at the age of 33, after several injury problems.

== International career ==
Festa earned 19 caps for Portugal over three years. His debut came on 23 January 1963 against Bulgaria, for the 1964 European Nations' Cup qualifiers (1–0 replay loss in Rome).

Festa was selected for the 1966 FIFA World Cup squad, playing three matches in England for the third-placed team.

== Personal life and death ==
Festa suffered from Alzheimer's disease in later life. He died on 2 January 2024, aged 84.
