= José Pereira (footballer) =

Portuguese footballer

Personal information
- Full name: José Costa Pereira
- Date of birth: 15 September 1931 (age 95)
- Place of birth: Torres Vedras, Portugal
- Height: 1.77 m (5 ft 10 in)
- Position: Goalkeeper

Senior career*
Years	Team	Apps	(Gls)
1952–1967	Belenenses	302	(0)
1967–1971	Beira-Mar		

International career
1965–1966	Portugal	11	(0)
Medal record
Men's football
Representing Portugal
FIFA World Cup
Third place	1966 England
- * Club domestic league appearances and goals

José Costa Pereira MPIH (born 15 September 1931) is a Portuguese former footballer who played as a goalkeeper. He was nicknamed Pássaro Azul (Blue Bird).

== Club career ==
Born in Torres Vedras, Lisbon District, Pereira played at club level for C.F. Os Belenenses and S.C. Beira-Mar. He appeared in 302 Primeira Liga matches with the former, retiring with the latter at almost 40 and moving with his wife to Barcelona, completely removing himself from the football world.

== International career ==
Pereira earned 11 caps for Portugal, making his debut on 19 April 1965 in a 1–0 away win over Turkey for the 1966 FIFA World Cup qualifiers at the age of 33. In the finals in England, manager Otto Glória picked Joaquim Carvalho for the first game against Hungary, which ended with a 3–1 victory, but Pereira would be first choice for the remainder of the tournament, with the national team finishing in a best-ever third place.

Pereira played his last international on 13 November 1966, appearing in a 2–1 home loss to Sweden for the UEFA Euro 1968 qualifying stage.
