= 1965–66 Primeira Divisão =

32nd season of top-tier Portuguese football

Primeira Liga
- Season: 1965-66
- Champions: Sporting CP; 12th title
- Matches: 182
- Goals: 614 (3.37 per match)

Statistics of Portuguese Liga in the 1965–66 season.

== Overview ==
It was contested by 14 teams, and Sporting Clube de Portugal won the championship.

== League standings ==
Pos	Team	Pld	W	D	L	GF	GA	GD	Pts	Qualification or relegation
1	Sporting CP (C)	26	18	6	2	70	21	+49	42	Qualification to European Cup first round
2	Benfica	26	18	5	3	73	30	+43	41	Qualification to Inter-Cities Fairs Cup first round
3	Porto	26	14	6	6	41	25	+16	34	Qualification to Inter-Cities Fairs Cup first round
4	Vitória de Guimarães	26	14	5	7	58	47	+11	33	
5	Vitória de Setúbal	26	11	7	8	51	36	+15	29	Qualification to Inter-Cities Fairs Cup first round
6	Académica	26	9	8	9	58	48	+10	26	
7	Belenenses	26	9	7	10	28	29	−1	25	
8	Varzim	26	9	7	10	40	38	+2	25	
9	CUF Barreiro	26	8	8	10	37	46	−9	24	
10	Braga	26	7	7	12	39	64	−25	21	Qualification to Cup Winners' Cup first round
11	Beira-Mar	26	6	6	14	31	65	−34	18	
12	Leixões	26	7	4	15	28	39	−11	18	
13	Lusitano de Évora (R)	26	4	6	16	27	60	−33	14	Relegation to Segunda Divisão
14	Barreirense (R)	26	5	4	17	32	65	−33	14	Relegation to Segunda Divisão

Source: RSSSF
(C) Champions; (R) Relegated

== Results ==
Home \ Away	ACA	BAR	BEM	BEL	BEN	BRA	CUF	LEI	LUS	POR	SCP	VAR	VGU	VSE
Académica		2–1	5–0	0–1	2–2	1–2	1–1	3–1	5–0	0–3	1–2	2–2	7–2	4–1
Barreirense	2–2		1–1	0–1	1–7	2–1	0–1	4–0	1–2	2–0	1–3	3–1	1–1	0–1
Beira Mar	1–5	3–2		1–1	1–1	5–1	1–3	3–2	2–0	1–3	1–4	3–2	1–2	1–0
Belenenses	3–1	1–1	1–0		1–3	0–0	0–0	3–0	1–1	2–1	1–1	3–1	2–1	0–1
Benfica	4–0	8–2	5–0	2–0		4–1	6–1	2–0	1–0	3–1	2–4	1–0	4–2	3–2
Braga	2–3	5–0	3–1	2–1	0–0		4–2	1–1	2–1	0–0	0–0	2–2	3–5	3–2
CUF Barreiro	1–1	7–3	2–0	1–0	1–3	1–1		3–1	2–2	1–1	0–0	0–2	2–2	0–2
Leixões	1–1	2–0	1–1	2–0	0–1	1–0	2–1		8–1	2–3	0–1	1–1	0–1	0–1
Lusitano Évora	1–1	3–0	2–2	1–3	1–2	6–1	1–3	0–2		0–0	2–5	2–0	1–1	0–5
Porto	4–3	0–1	2–0	1–0	2–0	4–2	3–0	1–0	2–0		1–1	3–0	3–0	0–0
Sporting CP	5–2	3–0	1–1	3–0	0–2	5–0	4–1	4–0	5–0	4–0		4–0	1–1	4–0
Varzim	1–2	4–1	6–0	1–1	1–1	3–0	2–1	2–0	2–0	1–0	1–2		2–0	1–1
Vitória de Guimarães	3–2	4–3	2–0	3–2	3–2	6–2	3–0	0–1	2–0	1–2	3–2	4–1		4–1
Vitória de Setúbal	2–2	2–0	8–1	1–0	4–4	8–1	1–2	1–0	2–0	1–1	1–2	1–1	2–2	

Legend: Blue = home team win; Yellow = draw; Red = away team win.
