= 1969–70 Primeira Divisão =

36th season of top-tier Portuguese football

Primeira Liga
- Season: 1969-70
- Champions: Sporting CP; 13th title
- Matches: 182
- Goals: 520 (2.86 per match)
- Top goalscorer: Eusébio (20 goals)

Statistics of Portuguese Liga in the 1969–70 season.

== Overview ==
It was contested by 14 teams, and Sporting Clube de Portugal won the championship.

== League standings ==
Pos	Team	Pld	W	D	L	GF	GA	GD	Pts	Qualification or relegation
1	Sporting CP (C)	26	21	4	1	61	17	+44	46	Qualification to European Cup first round
2	Benfica	26	17	4	5	58	14	+44	38	Qualification to Cup Winners' Cup first round
3	Vitória de Setúbal	26	16	4	6	58	26	+32	36	Qualification to Inter-Cities Fairs Cup first round
4	Barreirense	26	11	6	9	42	33	+9	28	Qualification to Inter-Cities Fairs Cup first round
5	Vitória de Guimarães	26	12	4	10	38	36	+2	28	Qualification to Inter-Cities Fairs Cup first round
6	Varzim	26	10	8	8	31	26	+5	28	
7	Belenenses	26	9	5	12	23	34	−11	23	
8	CUF Barreiro	26	9	5	12	24	38	−14	23	
9	Porto	26	8	6	12	30	37	−7	22	
10	Académica	26	8	6	12	42	46	−4	22	
11	Leixões	26	10	1	15	33	47	−14	21	
12	Boavista	26	6	6	14	35	61	−26	18	
13	Braga (R)	26	6	5	15	25	52	−27	17	Relegation to Segunda Divisão
14	União de Tomar (R)	26	5	4	17	20	53	−33	14	Relegation to Segunda Divisão

Source: RSSSF
(C) Champions; (R) Relegated

== Results ==
Home \ Away	ACA	BAR	BEL	BEN	BOA	BRA	CUF	LEI	POR	SCP	UTO	VAR	VGU	VSE
Académica		1–3	3–0	0–2	4–1	0–1	1–0	5–1	1–2	3–0	4–0	3–0	3–3	0–3
Barreirense	4–1		0–0	2–2	2–0	5–1	3–4	4–0	1–1	0–3	3–0	2–0	1–1	2–0
Belenenses	1–2	0–1		0–1	3–0	1–0	1–3	1–0	1–1	1–2	2–1	1–0	1–0	1–0
Benfica	3–0	3–0	0–0		8–0	5–0	0–1	3–0	2–0	1–1	6–0	1–0	5–0	2–1
Boavista	2–2	3–2	4–1	1–1		2–0	0–0	3–2	3–2	0–0	2–0	1–2	1–1	2–2
Braga	1–1	1–0	1–0	1–3	3–0		0–1	3–1	1–1	1–3	1–1	1–2	2–1	1–1
CUF Barreiro	1–1	0–1	0–2	0–2	2–1	3–1		1–0	2–1	1–3	1–2	1–1	1–0	0–4
Leixões	1–0	2–0	5–1	2–0	6–2	2–1	1–0		2–0	2–5	1–0	0–1	0–1	1–3
Porto	3–3	1–1	0–0	1–2	2–1	2–0	2–0	5–1		0–1	2–0	0–1	1–0	0–3
Sporting CP	2–1	1–0	2–1	1–0	3–0	4–0	3–0	4–1	2–1		5–0	1–1	5–1	3–1
União de Tomar	1–0	2–2	2–1	0–4	4–2	1–1	0–0	0–1	3–0	0–3		0–2	1–2	1–2
Varzim	2–2	1–2	1–1	0–1	4–1	3–2	2–0	0–0	0–2	0–0	2–0		4–1	1–1
Vitória de Guimarães	4–0	3–0	1–2	2–1	3–2	2–0	4–0	2–0	1–0	1–2	2–1	0–0		2–1
Vitória de Setúbal	5–1	2–1	4–0	1–0	2–1	7–1	2–2	2–1	5–0	0–2	2–0	2–1	2–0	

Legend: Blue = home team win; Yellow = draw; Red = away team win.
