= 2014–15 in Spanish football =

Football in Spain
- Season: 2014–15

Men's football
- La Liga: Barcelona
- Segunda División: Real Betis
- Segunda División B: Real Oviedo
- Copa del Rey: Barcelona
- Copa Federación: Real Unión
- Supercopa: Atlético Madrid

Women's football
- Primera División: Barcelona
- Copa de la Reina: Sporting Huelva

The 2014–15 season was the 113th season of competitive association football in Spain.

== Promotion and relegation ==
=== Pre-season ===
League	Promoted to league	Relegated from league
La Liga	Eibar; Deportivo La Coruña; Córdoba	Osasuna; Real Valladolid; Real Betis
Segunda División	Racing Santander; Leganés; Llagostera; Albacete	Real Murcia; Real Madrid Castilla; Real Jaén; Hércules
Segunda División B	Somozas; Lealtad; Langreo; Leioa; Cornellà; Eldense; Trival Valderas; Rayo Vallecano B; Real Valladolid B; Atlético Astorga; Marbella; Real Betis B; San Roque de Lepe; Mallorca B; UCAM Murcia; Villanovense; Real Zaragoza B; Socuéllamos	Ourense; Caudal; Logroñés; Noja; Real Madrid C; Laudio; Puerta Bonita; Peña Sport; Sariñena; Prat; Levante UD B; Constància; Ontinyent; Algeciras; San Fernando; Atlético Sanluqueño; Écija
Primera División (women)	Albacete; Santa Teresa CD	Granada CF; Levante Las Planas

== National teams ==
=== Spain national football team ===
==== UEFA Euro 2016 qualifying ====
Pos	Team	Pld	W	D	L	GF	GA	GD	Pts	Qualification	(Spain)	(Slovakia)	(Ukraine)	(Belarus)	(Luxembourg)	(North Macedonia)
1	Spain	10	9	0	1	23	3	+20	27	Qualify for final tournament	—	2–0	1–0	3–0	4–0	5–1
2	Slovakia	10	7	1	2	17	8	+9	22	Qualify for final tournament	2–1	—	0–0	0–1	3–0	2–1
3	Ukraine	10	6	1	3	14	4	+10	19	Advance to play-offs	0–1	0–1	—	3–1	3–0	1–0
4	Belarus	10	3	2	5	8	14	−6	11		0–1	1–3	0–2	—	2–0	0–0
5	Luxembourg	10	1	1	8	6	27	−21	4 (Note: Tied on head-to-head points (3) and head-to-head goal difference (0). Head-to-head away goals: Luxembourg 2, Macedonia 0.)		0–4	2–4	0–3	1–1	—	1–0
6	Macedonia	10	1	1	8	6	18	−12	4		0–1	0–2	0–2	1–2	3–2	—

Source: UEFA
Rules for classification: Qualification tiebreakers

==== Results and fixtures ====
4 September 2014 Friendly	France	1–0	Spain	Saint-Denis, France
	Rémy 73'			Stadium: Stade de France; Attendance: 79,000; Referee: Alain Bieri (Switzerland)

8 September 2014 UEFA EURO 2016 Q	Spain	5–1	Macedonia	Valencia, Spain
20:45 (UTC+2)	Ramos 16' (pen.); Alcácer 17'; Busquets 45+3'; Silva 50'; Pedro 90+1'	Report	Ibraimi 28' (pen.)	Stadium: Estadi Ciutat de València; Attendance: 18,553; Referee: Anastasios Sidiropoulos (Greece)

9 October 2014 UEFA EURO 2016 Q	Slovakia	2–1	Spain	Žilina, Slovakia
20:45 (UTC+2)	Kucka 17'; Stoch 87'	Report	Alcácer 83'	Stadium: Štadión pod Dubňom; Attendance: 9,478; Referee: Björn Kuipers (Netherlands)

12 October 2014 UEFA EURO 2016 Q	Luxembourg	0–4	Spain	Luxembourg, Luxembourg
20:45 (UTC+2)		Report	Silva 27'; Alcácer 42'; Costa 69'; Bernat 88'	Stadium: Stade Josy Barthel; Attendance: 8,500; Referee: Paweł Gil (Poland)

15 November 2014 UEFA EURO 2016 Q	Spain	3–0	Belarus	Huelva, Spain
20:45 (UTC+1)	Isco 18'; Busquets 19'; Pedro 55'	Report		Stadium: Estadio Nuevo Colombino; Attendance: 19,249; Referee: Kenn Hansen (Denmark)

18 November 2014 Friendly	Spain	0–1	Germany	Vigo, Spain
20:45 CET (UTC+01:00)		Report	Kroos 89'	Stadium: Balaídos; Attendance: 54,449; Referee: Mark Clattenburg (England)

27 March 2015 UEFA EURO 2016 Q	Spain	1–0	Ukraine	Seville, Spain
20:45 (UTC+1)	Morata 28'	Report		Stadium: Ramón Sánchez Pizjuán; Attendance: 33,775; Referee: Cüneyt Çakır (Turkey)

31 March 2015 Friendly	Netherlands	2–0	Spain	Amsterdam, Netherlands
20:45 (UTC+1)	De Vrij 13'; Klaassen 16'	Report		Stadium: Amsterdam Arena; Attendance: 51,500; Referee: Willie Collum (Scotland)

11 June 2015 Friendly	Spain	2–1	Costa Rica	León, Spain
22:00 (UTC+1)	Alcácer 8'; Fàbregas 30'	Report	Venegas 6'	Stadium: Reino de León; Attendance: 13,000; Referee: Domagoj Vučkov (Croatia)

14 June 2015 UEFA EURO 2016 Q	Belarus	0–1	Spain	Barysaw, Belarus
20:45 (UTC+3)		Report	Silva 45'	Stadium: Borisov Arena; Attendance: 13,121; Referee: Robert Schörgenhofer (Austria)

=== Spain women's national football team ===
==== 2015 FIFA Women's World Cup qualification (UEFA) Group 2 ====
Pos	Team	Pld	W	D	L	GF	GA	GD	Pts	Qualification	Spain	Italy	Czech Republic	Romania	Estonia	North Macedonia
1	Spain	10	9	1	0	42	2	+40	28	Women's World Cup	—	2–0	3–2	1–0	6–0	12–0
2	Italy	10	8	1	1	48	5	+43	25	Play-offs	0–0	—	6–1	1–0	4–0	15–0
3	Czech Republic	10	4	2	4	21	18	+3	14		0–1	0–4	—	0–0	6–0	5–2
4	Romania	10	3	2	5	18	11	+7	11		0–2	1–2	0–0	—	0–3 (Note: Estonia were awarded a 3–0 win. The match originally ended 2–0 to Romania.)	6–1
5	Estonia	10	2	1	7	8	33	−25	7		0–5	1–5	1–4	0–2	—	1–1
6	Macedonia	10	0	1	9	6	74	−68	1		0–10	0–11	1–3	1–9	0–2	—

Source: UEFA
Rules for classification: Tiebreakers

==== 2015 FIFA Women's World Cup Group E ====
Pos	Team	Pld	W	D	L	GF	GA	GD	Pts	Qualification	BRA	KOR	CRC	ESP
1	Brazil	3	3	0	0	4	0	+4	9	Advance to knockout stage	—			
2	South Korea	3	1	1	1	4	5	−1	4	Advance to knockout stage		—		
3	Costa Rica	3	0	2	1	3	4	−1	2				—	
4	Spain	3	0	1	2	2	4	−2	1					—

Source: FIFA
Rules for classification: Group stage tiebreakers

==== Results and fixtures ====
13 September 2014 2015 FIFA WC Q	Romania	0–2	Spain	Iași, Romania
16:00		Report	Pablos 28', 59'	Stadium: Stadionul Emil Alexandrescu; Attendance: 350; Referee: (Sweden) Linn Andersson

17 September 2014 2015 FIFA WC Q	Czech Republic	0–1	Spain	Písek, Czech Republic
16:00		Report	Boquete 90+1'	Stadium: Spartak Písek; Attendance: 465; Referee: (France) Stéphanie Frappart

10 February 2015 Friendly	Spain	2–2	Austria	San Pedro del Pinatar, Spain
	Putellas 7'; Borja 52'	Report	Burger 36'; Maierhofer 64'	Stadium: Pinatar Arena; Referee: (Spain) Marta Frías

11 February 2015 Friendly	Spain	2–1	Belgium	San Pedro del Pinatar, Spain
	Torrejón 43'; Bermúdez 67'	Report	Wullaert 7'	Stadium: Pinatar Arena; Referee: (Spain) Beatriz Gil

3 March 2015 Friendly	Spain	2–2	New Zealand	La Roda, Spain
	Boquete 20'; Bermúdez 52'	Report	Wilkinson 63'; Hearn 82'	Stadium: Municipal

5 March 2015 Friendly	Spain	0–0	New Zealand	Guadalajara, Spain
		Report		Stadium: Pedro Escartín

8 April 2015 Friendly	Spain	1–0	Republic of Ireland	Gijón, Spain
18:00	Hermoso 47'	Report		Stadium: Pepe Ortiz; Referee: (Spain) Beatriz Gil

9 June 2015 2015 FIFA WC GS	Spain	1–1	Costa Rica	Montreal, Canada
16:00	Vicky 13'	Report	Rodríguez Cedeño 14'	Stadium: Olympic Stadium; Attendance: 10,175; Referee: (Argentina) Salomé di Iorio

13 June 2015 2015 FIFA WC GS	Brazil	1–0	Spain	Montreal, Canada
16:00	Alves 44'	Report		Stadium: Olympic Stadium; Attendance: 28,623; Referee: (Canada) Carol Chenard

17 June 2015 2015 FIFA WC GS	South Korea	2–1	Spain	Ottawa, Canada
19:00	Cho 53'; Kim 78'	Report	Boquete 29'	Stadium: Lansdowne Park; Attendance: 21,562; Referee: (New Zealand) Anna-Marie Keighley

== FIFA competitions ==
=== 2014 FIFA Club World Cup ===
==== Semifinals ====
16 December 2014
19:30

Cruz Azul (Mexico)	0–4	(Spain) Real Madrid
	Report	Ramos 15'; Benzema 36'; Bale 50'; Isco 72'

Stade de Marrakech, Marrakesh
Attendance: 34,862
Referee: Enrique Osses (Chile)

==== Final ====
20 December 2014
19:30 UTC±0

Real Madrid (Spain)	2–0	(Argentina) San Lorenzo
Ramos 37'; Bale 51'	Report

Stade de Marrakech, Marrakesh
Attendance: 38,345
Referee: Walter López (Guatemala)

== UEFA competitions ==
=== 2014–15 UEFA Champions League ===
==== Play-off round ====
Team 1	Agg.	Team 2	1st leg	2nd leg
Napoli (Italy)	2–4	(Spain) Athletic Bilbao	1–1	1–3

==== Group stage ====
===== Group A =====
Pos	Team	Pld	W	D	L	GF	GA	GD	Pts	Qualification	ATM	JUV	OLY	MAL
1	(Spain) Atlético Madrid	6	4	1	1	14	3	+11	13	Advance to knockout phase	—	1–0	4–0	5–0
2	(Italy) Juventus	6	3	1	2	7	4	+3	10	Advance to knockout phase	0–0	—	3–2	2–0
3	(Greece) Olympiacos	6	3	0	3	10	13	−3	9	Transfer to Europa League	3–2	1–0	—	4–2
4	(Sweden) Malmö FF	6	1	0	5	4	15	−11	3		0–2	0–2	2–0	—

Source: UEFA

===== Group B =====
Pos	Team	Pld	W	D	L	GF	GA	GD	Pts	Qualification	RMA	BSL	LIV	LUD
1	(Spain) Real Madrid	6	6	0	0	16	2	+14	18	Advance to knockout phase	—	5–1	1–0	4–0
2	(Switzerland) Basel	6	2	1	3	7	8	−1	7	Advance to knockout phase	0–1	—	1–0	4–0
3	(England) Liverpool	6	1	2	3	5	9	−4	5	Transfer to Europa League	0–3	1–1	—	2–1
4	(Bulgaria) Ludogorets Razgrad	6	1	1	4	5	14	−9	4		1–2	1–0	2–2	—

Source: UEFA

===== Group F =====
Pos	Team	Pld	W	D	L	GF	GA	GD	Pts	Qualification	BAR	PAR	AJX	APO
1	(Spain) Barcelona	6	5	0	1	15	5	+10	15	Advance to knockout phase	—	3–1	3–1	1–0
2	(France) Paris Saint-Germain	6	4	1	1	10	7	+3	13	Advance to knockout phase	3–2	—	3–1	1–0
3	(Netherlands) Ajax	6	1	2	3	8	10	−2	5	Transfer to Europa League	0–2	1–1	—	4–0
4	(Cyprus) APOEL	6	0	1	5	1	12	−11	1		0–4	0–1	1–1	—

Source: UEFA

===== Group H =====
Pos	Team	Pld	W	D	L	GF	GA	GD	Pts	Qualification	POR	SHK	ATH	BATE
1	(Portugal) Porto	6	4	2	0	16	4	+12	14	Advance to knockout phase	—	1–1	2–1	6–0
2	(Ukraine) Shakhtar Donetsk	6	2	3	1	15	4	+11	9	Advance to knockout phase	2–2	—	0–1	5–0
3	(Spain) Athletic Bilbao	6	2	1	3	5	6	−1	7	Transfer to Europa League	0–2	0–0	—	2–0
4	(Belarus) BATE Borisov	6	1	0	5	2	24	−22	3		0–3	0–7	2–1	—

Source: UEFA

==== Knockout phase ====
===== Round of 16 =====
Team 1	Agg.	Team 2	1st leg	2nd leg
Manchester City (England)	1–3	(Spain) Barcelona	1–2	0–1
Bayer Leverkusen (Germany)	1–1 (2–3 p)	(Spain) Atlético Madrid	1–0	0–1 (a.e.t.)
Schalke 04 (Germany)	4–5	(Spain) Real Madrid	0–2	4–3

===== Quarter-finals =====
Team 1	Agg.	Team 2	1st leg	2nd leg
Paris Saint-Germain (France)	1–5	(Spain) Barcelona	1–3	0–2
Atlético Madrid (Spain)	0–1	(Spain) Real Madrid	0–0	0–1

===== Semi-finals =====
Team 1	Agg.	Team 2	1st leg	2nd leg
Barcelona (Spain)	5–3	(Germany) Bayern Munich	3–0	2–3
Juventus (Italy)	3–2	(Spain) Real Madrid	2–1	1–1

===== Final =====
6 June 2015
20:45

Juventus (Italy)	1–3	(Spain) Barcelona
Morata 55'	Report	Rakitić 4'; Suárez 68'; Neymar 90+7'

Olympiastadion, Berlin
Attendance: 70,442
Referee: Cüneyt Çakır (Turkey)

=== 2014–15 UEFA Europa League ===
==== Third qualifying round ====
Team 1	Agg.	Team 2	1st leg	2nd leg
Real Sociedad (Spain)	5–2	(Scotland) Aberdeen	2–0	3–2

==== Play-off round ====
Team 1	Agg.	Team 2	1st leg	2nd leg
Astana (Kazakhstan)	0–7	(Spain) Villarreal	0–3	0–4
Real Sociedad (Spain)	1–3	(Russia) Krasnodar	1–0	0–3

==== Group stage ====
===== Group A =====
Pos	Team	Pld	W	D	L	GF	GA	GD	Pts	Qualification	MGB	VIL	ZUR	APL
1	(Germany) Borussia Mönchengladbach	6	3	3	0	14	4	+10	12	Advance to knockout phase	—	1–1	3–0	5–0
2	(Spain) Villarreal	6	3	2	1	15	7	+8	11	Advance to knockout phase	2–2	—	4–1	4–0
3	(Switzerland) Zürich	6	2	1	3	10	14	−4	7		1–1	3–2	—	3–1
4	(Cyprus) Apollon Limassol	6	1	0	5	4	18	−14	3		0–2	0–2	3–2	—

Source: Soccerway

===== Group G =====
Pos	Team	Pld	W	D	L	GF	GA	GD	Pts	Qualification	FEY	SEV	RIJ	STA
1	(Netherlands) Feyenoord	6	4	0	2	10	6	+4	12	Advance to knockout phase	—	2–0	2–0	2–1
2	(Spain) Sevilla	6	3	2	1	8	5	+3	11	Advance to knockout phase	2–0	—	1–0	3–1
3	(Croatia) Rijeka	6	2	1	3	7	8	−1	7		3–1	2–2	—	2–0
4	(Belgium) Standard Liège	6	1	1	4	4	10	−6	4		0–3	0–0	2–0	—

Source: Soccerway

==== Knockout phase ====
===== Round of 32 =====
Team 1	Agg.	Team 2	1st leg	2nd leg
Torino (Italy)	5–4	(Spain) Athletic Bilbao	2–2	3–2
Sevilla (Spain)	4–2	(Germany) Borussia Mönchengladbach	1–0	3–2
Villarreal (Spain)	5–2	(Austria) Red Bull Salzburg	2–1	3–1

===== Round of 16 =====
Team 1	Agg.	Team 2	1st leg	2nd leg
Villarreal (Spain)	2–5	(Spain) Sevilla	1–3	1–2

===== Quarter-finals =====
Team 1	Agg.	Team 2	1st leg	2nd leg
Sevilla (Spain)	4–3	(Russia) Zenit Saint Petersburg	2–1	2–2

===== Semi-finals =====
Team 1	Agg.	Team 2	1st leg	2nd leg
Sevilla (Spain)	5–0	(Italy) Fiorentina	3–0	2–0

===== Final =====
27 May 2015
20:45

Dnipro Dnipropetrovsk (Ukraine)	2–3	(Spain) Sevilla
Kalinić 7'; Rotan 44'	Report	Krychowiak 28'; Bacca 31', 73'

Stadion Narodowy, Warsaw
Attendance: 45,000
Referee: Martin Atkinson (England)

=== Group A ===
Pos	Team	Pld	W	D	L	GF	GA	GD	Pts	Qualification
1	(Spain) Atlético Madrid	6	5	0	1	11	5	+6	15	Advance to knockout phase
2	(Greece) Olympiacos	6	4	1	1	12	4	+8	13	Advance to knockout phase
3	(Italy) Juventus	6	1	2	3	5	10	−5	5	
4	(Sweden) Malmö FF	6	0	1	5	5	14	−9	1	

Source: UEFA
Rules for classification: Group stage tiebreakers

=== Group B ===
Pos	Team	Pld	W	D	L	GF	GA	GD	Pts	Qualification
1	(Spain) Real Madrid	6	4	0	2	19	7	+12	12	Advance to knockout phase
2	(England) Liverpool	6	4	0	2	16	9	+7	12	Advance to knockout phase
3	(Switzerland) Basel	6	4	0	2	17	9	+8	12	
4	(Bulgaria) Ludogorets Razgrad	6	0	0	6	0	27	−27	0	

Source: UEFA
Rules for classification: Group stage tiebreakers

=== Group F ===
Pos	Team	Pld	W	D	L	GF	GA	GD	Pts	Qualification
1	(Netherlands) Ajax	6	4	2	0	19	7	+12	14	Advance to knockout phase
2	(Spain) Barcelona	6	2	3	1	10	7	+3	9	Advance to knockout phase
3	(France) Paris Saint-Germain	6	2	2	2	15	14	+1	8	
4	(Cyprus) APOEL	6	0	1	5	3	19	−16	1	

Source: UEFA
Rules for classification: Group stage tiebreakers

=== Group H ===
Pos	Team	Pld	W	D	L	GF	GA	GD	Pts	Qualification
1	(Ukraine) Shakhtar Donetsk	6	4	2	0	15	3	+12	14	Advance to knockout phase
2	(Portugal) Porto	6	2	3	1	7	5	+2	9	Advance to knockout phase
3	(Spain) Athletic Bilbao	6	3	0	3	9	12	−3	9	
4	(Belarus) BATE Borisov	6	0	1	5	2	13	−11	1	

Source: UEFA
Rules for classification: Group stage tiebreakers

==== Round of 16 ====
27 January 2015
19:00

Atlético Madrid (Spain)	1–0	(England) Arsenal
Diedhiou 1'	Report

Ciudad Deportiva Cerro Del Espino, Majadahonda
Referee: Hugo Miguel (Portugal)
17 February 2015
18:00

Real Madrid (Spain)	1–1	(Portugal) Porto
Mayoral 60'	Report	Leonardo 81' (pen.)
Penalties
Cedrés (penalty missed); Mayoral (penalty scored); Febas (penalty missed); Lienhart (penalty missed)	1–3	(penalty scored) Johansen; (penalty scored) Cardoso; (penalty scored) Leonardo

Alfredo di Stéfano, Madrid
Referee: Adrien Jaccottet (Switzerland)
23 February 2015
20:00

Anderlecht (Belgium)	1–0	(Spain) Barcelona
Iseka 53'	Report

Constant Vanden Stock Stadium, Anderlecht
Referee: Jakob Kehlet (Denmark)

===== Quarter-finals =====
10 March 2015
16:00

Chelsea (England)	2–0	(Spain) Atlético Madrid
Manzanara 38' (o.g.); Solanke 89'	Report

Cobham Training Centre, Cobham
Referee: Andreas Ekberg (Sweden)

=== 2014 UEFA Super Cup ===
12 August 2014
19:45 BST

Real Madrid (Spain)	2–0	(Spain) Sevilla
Ronaldo 30', 49'	Report

Cardiff City Stadium, Cardiff
Attendance: 30,854
Referee: Mark Clattenburg (England)

=== 2014–15 UEFA Women's Champions League ===
==== Knockout phase ====
===== Round of 32 =====
Team 1	Agg.	Team 2	1st leg	2nd leg
Slavia Praha (Czech Republic)	0–4	(Spain) Barcelona	0–1	0–3

===== Round of 16 =====
Team 1	Agg.	Team 2	1st leg	2nd leg
Barcelona (Spain)	1–2	(England) Bristol Academy	0–1	1–1

== League table ==
Pos	Team	Pld	W	D	L	GF	GA	GD	Pts	Qualification or relegation
1	Barcelona (C)	38	30	4	4	110	21	+89	94	Qualification to UEFA Champions League group stage (Note: Sevilla qualified for the Champions League group stage by winning the 2014–15 UEFA Europa League. As a result, the fifth-placed spot for the Europa League group stage they earned was vacated without replacement as per UEFA regulations.)
2	Real Madrid	38	30	2	6	118	38	+80	92	Qualification to UEFA Champions League group stage
3	Atlético Madrid	38	23	9	6	67	29	+38	78	Qualification to UEFA Champions League group stage
4	Valencia	38	22	11	5	70	32	+38	77	Qualification to UEFA Champions League play-off round
5	Sevilla	38	23	7	8	71	45	+26	76	Qualification to UEFA Champions League group stage
6	Villarreal	38	16	12	10	48	37	+11	60	Qualification to UEFA Europa League group stage (Note: Since the winners of the 2014–15 Copa del Rey, Barcelona, qualified for European competition based on league position, the spot awarded to the cup winners (Europa League group stage) was passed to the sixth-placed team, and the spot awarded to the sixth-placed team (Europa League third qualifying round) was passed to the seventh-placed team.)
7	Athletic Bilbao	38	15	10	13	42	41	+1	55	Qualification to UEFA Europa League third qualifying round
8	Celta Vigo	38	13	12	13	47	44	+3	51	
9	Málaga	38	14	8	16	42	48	−6	50	
10	Espanyol	38	13	10	15	47	51	−4	49 (Note: Espanyol ahead on head-to-head record; Rayo Vallecano–Espanyol 1–3, Espanyol–Rayo Vallecano 1–1.)	
11	Rayo Vallecano	38	15	4	19	46	68	−22	49	
12	Real Sociedad	38	11	13	14	44	51	−7	46	
13	Elche (Note: Elche administratively relegated by the LFP.) (R)	38	11	8	19	35	62	−27	41	Relegation to Segunda División
14	Levante	38	9	10	19	34	67	−33	37 (Note: Levante ahead on head-to-head record; Levante–Getafe 1–1, Getafe–Levante 0–1.)	
15	Getafe	38	10	7	21	33	64	−31	37	
16	Deportivo La Coruña	38	7	14	17	35	60	−25	35 (Note: Head-to-head record: Deportivo 7 pts, Granada 6 pts, Eibar 2 pts)	
17	Granada	38	7	14	17	29	64	−35	35	
18	Eibar	38	9	8	21	34	55	−21	35	
19	Almería (Note: Almería was docked 3 points due to an unpayment of a transfer.) (R)	38	8	8	22	35	64	−29	29	Relegation to Segunda División
20	Córdoba (R)	38	3	11	24	22	68	−46	20	Relegation to Segunda División

Source: La Liga
Rules for classification: 1) points; 2) head-to-head points; 3) head-to-head goal difference; 4) goal difference; 5) number of goals scored; 6) fair-play points; 7) playoff match
(C) Champions; (R) Relegated

== League table ==
Pos	Team	Pld	W	D	L	GF	GA	GD	Pts	Promotion, qualification or relegation
1	Real Betis (C, P)	42	25	9	8	73	40	+33	84	Promotion to La Liga
2	Sporting Gijón (P)	42	21	19	2	57	27	+30	82 (Note: Sporting de Gijón ahead on goal differential; Sporting de Gijón +30, Girona +28)	Promotion to La Liga
3	Girona	42	24	10	8	63	35	+28	82	Qualification to Promotion play-offs
4	Las Palmas (O, P)	42	22	12	8	73	47	+26	78	Qualification to Promotion play-offs
5	Valladolid	42	21	9	12	65	40	+25	72	Qualification to Promotion play-offs
6	Zaragoza	42	15	16	11	61	58	+3	61	Qualification to Promotion play-offs
7	Ponferradina	42	16	12	14	55	51	+4	60	
8	Mirandés	42	16	11	15	42	44	−2	59	
9	Llagostera	42	15	12	15	41	41	0	57	
10	Leganés	42	15	11	16	48	42	+6	56	
11	Alcorcón	42	12	18	12	44	49	−5	54	
12	Numancia	42	12	17	13	54	55	−1	53 (Note: Numancia ahead on head-to-head record; Numancia-Alavés 1-0, Alavés-Numancia 0-3)	
13	Alavés	42	14	11	17	49	53	−4	53	
14	Albacete	42	14	9	19	55	65	−10	51	
15	Lugo	42	11	16	15	48	56	−8	49	
16	Mallorca	42	13	9	20	51	64	−13	48 (Note: Mallorca ahead on head-to-head record; Mallorca-Tenerife 2-1, Tenerife-Mallorca 0-0)	
17	Tenerife	42	11	15	16	41	48	−7	48	
18	Osasuna	42	11	12	19	41	60	−19	45	
19	Racing Santander (R)	42	12	8	22	42	53	−11	44	Relegation to Segunda División B
20	Recreativo (R)	42	10	11	21	37	59	−22	41	Relegation to Segunda División B
21	Sabadell (R)	42	8	14	20	41	66	−25	38	Relegation to Segunda División B
22	Barcelona B (R)	42	9	9	24	55	83	−28	36	Relegation to Segunda División B

Source: LFP - Liga Adelante
Rules for classification: 1) points; 2) head-to-head points; 3) head-to-head goal difference; 4) goal difference; 5) number of goals scored
(C) Champions; (O) Play-off winners; (P) Promoted; (R) Relegated

=== Semifinals ===
Team 1	Agg.	Team 2	1st leg	2nd leg
Valladolid	1–1 (a)	Las Palmas	1–1	0–0
Zaragoza	4–4 (a)	Girona	0–3	4–1

=== Final ===
Team 1	Agg.	Team 2	1st leg	2nd leg
Zaragoza	3–3 (a)	Las Palmas	3–1	0-2

==== Segunda División B ====
Group 1
Pos	Team	Pld	Pts
1	Oviedo (P)	38	80
2	Murcia	38	72
3	Racing Ferrol	38	69
4	UD Logroñés	38	66
5	Guijuelo	38	61
6	Compostela	38	61
7	Cultural Leonesa	38	59
8	Coruxo	38	53
9	Valladolid B	38	52
10	Somozas	38	52
11	Sporting Gijón B	38	50
12	Burgos	38	49
13	Celta Vigo B	38	48
14	Atlético Astorga	38	45
15	Lealtad	38	44
16	Avilés (R)	38	43
17	Langreo (R)	38	43
18	Zamora (R)	38	39
19	Tropezón (R)	38	36
20	Marino Luanco (R)	38	21

Updated to match(es) played on 28 June 2015.
Source: Futbolme.com
(P) Promoted;
(R) Relegated

Group 2
Pos	Team	Pld	Pts
1	Huesca (P)	38	69
2	Bilbao Athletic (P)	38	66
3	Guadalajara	38	61
4	Real Unión	38	60
5	Tudelano	38	58
6	Real Madrid Castilla	38	58
7	Barakaldo	38	58
8	Socuéllamos	38	58
9	Toledo	38	57
10	Amorebieta	38	52
11	Getafe B	38	51
12	Fuenlabrada	38	51
13	Sestao River	38	50
14	Real Sociedad B	38	48
15	Leioa	38	48
16	Las Palmas Atlético (R)	38	47
17	Rayo Vallecano B (R)	38	43
18	Atlético Madrid B (R)	38	41
19	Trival Valderas (R)	38	37
20	Conquense (R)	38	30

Updated to match(es) played on 28 June 2015.
Source: Futbolme.com
(P) Promoted;
(R) Relegated

Group 3
Pos	Team	Pld	Pts
1	Gimnàstic (P)	38	73
2	Huracán Valencia	38	65
3	Reus	38	63
4	Hércules	38	63
5	Lleida Esportiu	38	61
6	Alcoyano	38	59
7	Badalona	38	56
8	Olímpic	38	55
9	L'Hospitalet	38	54
10	Villarreal B	38	53
11	Espanyol B	38	53
12	Atlético Baleares	38	49
13	Olot	38	48
14	Valencia Mestalla	38	48
15	Cornellà	38	45
16	Eldense (O)	38	45
17	Mallorca B (R)	38	44
18	Sant Andreu (R)	38	39
19	Elche Ilicitano (R)	38	35
20	Zaragoza B (R)	38	34

Updated to match(es) played on 28 June 2015.
Source: Futbolme.com
(O) Play-off winners;
(P) Promoted;
(R) Relegated

Group 4
Pos	Team	Pld	Pts
1	Cádiz	38	76
2	UCAM Murcia	38	65
3	Almería B	38	62
4	Villanovense	38	61
5	Granada B	38	58
6	Linense	38	58
7	Melilla	38	54
8	Betis B	38	52
9	San Roque de Lepe	38	51
10	Marbella	38	51
11	Jaén	38	49
12	Cacereño	38	47
13	La Hoya Lorca	38	45
14	Sevilla Atlético	38	44
15	La Roda	38	43
16	Cartagena (O)	38	43
17	Córdoba B (R)	38	43
18	Arroyo (R)	38	43
19	El Palo (R)	38	41
20	Lucena (R)	38	39

Updated to match(es) played on 28 June 2015.
Source: Futbolme.com
(O) Play-off winners;
(R) Relegated

==== Semifinals ====
Team 1	Agg.	Team 2	1st leg	2nd leg
Huesca	1–3	Gimnàstic	0–0	1–3
Oviedo	2–1	Cádiz	1–1	1–0

==== Final ====
Team 1	Agg.	Team 2	1st leg	2nd leg
Gimnàstic	2–4	Oviedo	2–1	0–3

=== First round ===
Team 1	Agg.	Team 2	1st leg	2nd leg
UD Logroñés	2–3	Huracán Valencia	1–1	1–2 (aet)
Hércules	2–1	Murcia	1–1	1–0
Real Unión	0–1	UCAM Murcia	0–0	0–1 (aet)
Villanovense	2–3	Bilbao Athletic	2–1	0–2
Almería B	3–3 (a)	Guadalajara	2–2	1–1
Racing Ferrol	2–1	Reus Deportiu	1–0	1–1

=== Second round ===
Team 1	Agg.	Team 2	1st leg	2nd leg
Hércules	2–2 (a)	Cádiz	2–1	0–1
Racing Ferrol	0–6	Huesca	0–4	0–2
Guadalajara	0–2	Huracán Valencia	0–0	0–2
Bilbao Athletic	2–1	UCAM Murcia	1–0	1–1

=== Third round ===
Team 1	Agg.	Team 2	1st leg	2nd leg
Bilbao Athletic	3–1	Cádiz	2–0	1–1
Huracán Valencia	1–3	Huesca	1–1	0–2

== Cup competitions ==
=== Copa del Rey ===
==== Final ====
30 May 2015
21:30 CEST

Athletic Bilbao	1–3	Barcelona
Williams 79'	Report	Messi 20', 74'; Neymar 36'

Camp Nou, Barcelona
Attendance: 99,354
Referee: Carlos Velasco Carballo

=== Supercopa de España ===
==== First leg ====
19 August 2014
23:00 CEST

Real Madrid	1–1	Atlético Madrid
Rodríguez 81'	Report	García 88'

Santiago Bernabéu, Madrid
Attendance: 75,897
Referee: Javier Estrada Fernández (Catalonia)

==== Second leg ====
22 August 2014
22:30 CEST

Atlético Madrid	1–0	Real Madrid
Mandžukić 2'	Report

Vicente Calderón, Madrid
Attendance: 54,000
Referee: David Fernández Borbalán (Andalusia)

Atlético Madrid won the Supercopa de España 2–1 on aggregate

=== Copa Federación de España ===
Team 1	Agg.	Team 2	1st leg	2nd leg
Castellón (4) (Valencian Community)	0–4	(Basque Country (autonomous community)) R. Unión (3)	0–1	0–3

== Women's football ==
=== League season ===
==== Primera División ====
Pos	Team	Pld	W	D	L	GF	GA	GD	Pts	Qualification or relegation
1	Barcelona (C)	30	25	2	3	93	9	+84	77	Qualification for UEFA Champions League and Copa de la Reina
2	Atlético Madrid	30	20	9	1	54	21	+33	69	Qualification for UEFA Champions League and Copa de la Reina
3	Athletic Bilbao	30	19	8	3	73	24	+49	65	Qualification for Copa de la Reina
4	Valencia	30	17	8	5	58	25	+33	59	Qualification for Copa de la Reina
5	Levante	30	15	10	5	60	25	+35	55	Qualification for Copa de la Reina
6	Rayo Vallecano	30	13	8	9	45	34	+11	47	Qualification for Copa de la Reina
7	Espanyol	30	12	7	11	50	54	−4	43	Qualification for Copa de la Reina
8	Sporting Huelva	30	11	8	11	51	55	−4	41	Qualification for Copa de la Reina
9	Santa Teresa	30	9	7	14	33	53	−20	34	
10	Oviedo Moderno	30	8	8	14	35	61	−26	32	
11	Real Sociedad	30	7	9	14	39	47	−8	30	
12	Collerense	30	7	4	19	32	65	−33	25	
13	Transportes Alcaine	30	5	10	15	27	53	−26	25	
14	Fundación Albacete	30	6	7	17	38	63	−25	25	
15	Sant Gabriel (R)	30	7	2	21	28	63	−35	23	Relegation to Segunda División
16	Sevilla (R)	30	4	3	23	27	91	−64	15	Relegation to Segunda División

Source: soccerway.com
Rules for classification: 1) points; 2) head-to-head points; 3) goal difference; 4) number of goals scored
(C) Champions; (R) Relegated

==== Segunda División ====
===== Group 1 =====
Pos	Team	Pld	W	D	L	GF	GA	GD	Pts	Qualification or relegation
1	FVPR El Olivo	26	21	3	2	75	23	+52	66	Qualification for promotion play-off
2	EF Mareo	26	14	5	7	52	37	+15	47	runner-up
3	Peluquería Mixta Friol	26	14	3	9	68	49	+19	45	
4	Sárdoma CF	26	12	5	9	53	34	+19	41	
5	SD Villestro	26	12	4	10	49	31	+18	40	
6	CF Bértola Femenino	26	10	9	7	50	45	+5	39	
7	Victoria CF	26	11	6	9	50	44	+6	39	
8	CD Amigos del Duero	26	11	2	13	31	41	−10	35	
9	Orzán SD	26	9	6	11	41	52	−11	33	
10	CD Salamanca FF	26	9	6	11	42	47	−5	33	
11	Erizana CF	26	9	5	12	32	35	−3	32	
12	Oviedo Moderno CF B	26	8	5	13	32	52	−20	29	Relegation to the 2015–16 Regional División
13	Gijón FF	26	8	4	14	40	54	−14	28	Relegation to the 2015–16 Regional División
14	UD Barbadás	26	2	1	23	15	86	−71	7	Relegation to the 2015–16 Regional División

== Group 2 ==
Pos	Team	Pld	W	D	L	GF	GA	GD	Pts	Qualification or relegation
1	Oiartzun KE	26	22	4	0	111	13	+98	70	Qualification for promotion play-off
2	Athletic Club "B"	26	21	3	2	101	20	+81	66	
3	CD Aurrerá de Vitoria	26	17	4	5	39	22	+17	55	runner-up
4	EDF Logroño	26	16	1	9	60	35	+25	49	
5	SD San Ignacio	26	13	8	5	50	27	+23	47	
6	Pauldarrak EFKT	26	14	5	7	74	43	+31	47	
7	Añorga KKE	26	11	8	7	56	49	+7	41	
8	CD Mariño	26	8	8	10	38	35	+3	32	
9	Abanto Club	26	7	4	15	35	62	−27	25	
10	CD Nuestra Señora de Belén	26	6	6	14	32	72	−40	24	
11	CF Ardoi FE	26	6	4	16	35	57	−22	22	
12	Reocín Racing	26	6	3	17	48	68	−20	21	Relegation to the 2015–16 Regional División
13	CF Gazte Berriak	26	2	4	20	21	96	−75	10	Relegation to the 2015–16 Regional División
14	UD Aragonesa	26	1	2	23	12	128	−116	5	Relegation to the 2015–16 Regional División

== Group 3 ==
Pos	Team	Pld	W	D	L	GF	GA	GD	Pts	Qualification or relegation
1	FC Levante Las Planas	26	22	1	3	85	20	+65	67	Qualification for promotion play-off
2	FC Barcelona "B"	26	19	6	1	77	12	+65	63	
3	CE Seagull	26	15	6	5	51	34	+17	51	runner-up
4	RCD Espanyol "B"	26	10	9	7	38	27	+11	39	
5	UE L'Estartit	26	11	5	10	38	36	+2	38	
6	CE Europa	26	11	5	10	50	45	+5	38	
7	CF Igualada	26	10	8	8	40	33	+7	38	
8	AD Son Sardina	26	10	6	10	51	49	+2	36	
9	SE AEM	26	9	7	10	46	41	+5	34	
10	CE Sant Gabriel "B"	26	7	8	11	42	48	−6	29	Relegation to the 2015–16 Regional División
11	CUE Vic	26	8	4	14	32	44	−12	28	
12	CD Transportes Alcaine "B"	26	8	3	15	35	65	−30	27	Relegation to the 2015–16 Regional División
13	UE Sant Andreu	26	4	1	21	27	70	−43	13	Relegation to the 2015–16 Regional División
14	CF Lloret	26	3	1	22	27	115	−88	10	Relegation to the 2015–16 Regional División

== Group 4 ==
Pos	Team	Pld	W	D	L	GF	GA	GD	Pts	Qualification or relegation
1	Real Betis Balompié	26	23	2	1	116	13	+103	71	Qualification for promotion play-off
2	CFF Badajoz	26	22	3	1	80	21	+59	69	runner-up
3	Granada CF	26	20	2	4	97	23	+74	62	
4	Atlético Málaga	26	13	4	9	60	35	+25	43	
5	CFF Cáceres	25	12	4	9	60	46	+14	40	
6	Extremadura Femenino CF	26	11	6	9	43	48	−5	39	
7	ADFB La Rambla	26	11	5	10	52	55	−3	38	
8	Algaidas CD	26	9	7	10	65	66	−1	34	
9	AD El Naranjo	26	9	5	12	62	79	−17	32	
10	UD La Cruz Villanovense	26	9	4	13	47	73	−26	31	
11	CD Híspalis	26	8	4	14	42	53	−11	28	
12	Monachil 2013 CF	26	4	1	21	27	97	−70	13	Relegation to the 2015–16 Regional División
13	AD Nervión	26	2	4	20	30	103	−73	10	Relegation to the 2015–16 Regional División
14	UD Carmelitas	26	3	1	22	23	92	−69	10	Relegation to the 2015–16 Regional División

== Group 5 ==
Pos	Team	Pld	W	D	L	GF	GA	GD	Pts	Qualification or relegation
1	Madrid CFF	26	22	3	1	117	17	+100	69	Qualification for promotion play-off
2	CD Canillas	26	19	2	5	58	27	+31	59	runner-up
3	Atlético de Madrid "B"	26	16	4	6	59	23	+36	52	
4	AD Alhóndiga	26	15	3	8	66	43	+23	48	
5	CF Pozuelo de Alarcón	26	13	8	5	54	33	+21	47	
6	FF La Solana	26	14	3	9	47	37	+10	45	
7	Dinamo Guadalajara	26	13	4	9	44	37	+7	43	
8	Rayo Vallecano "B"	26	8	6	12	40	51	−11	30	
9	CD Parquesol	26	8	5	13	37	45	−8	29	
10	Casa Social Católica de Ávila	26	7	6	13	41	64	−23	27	
11	Torrelodones CF	26	7	4	15	22	45	−23	25	
12	CDE TNT Daimiel	26	4	8	14	23	65	−42	20	Relegation to the 2015–16 Regional División
13	UD Tres Cantos	26	4	6	16	31	55	−24	18	Relegation to the 2015–16 Regional División
14	CD Independiente de Alcázar	26	0	2	24	16	113	−97	2	Relegation to the 2015–16 Regional División

== Group 6 ==
=== Group 6.1 ===
Pos	Team	Pld	W	D	L	GF	GA	GD	Pts	Qualification
1	CD Femarguín	24	22	1	1	261	9	+252	67	Qualification for title play-off
2	CD Achamán Santa Lucía	24	20	2	2	160	20	+140	62	Qualification for title play-off
3	CD Águilas	24	17	4	3	100	28	+72	55	
4	CF Unión Viera	24	17	2	5	100	27	+73	53	
5	CD Las Majoreras	24	16	3	5	65	38	+27	51	
6	CF UD Las Torres	24	10	1	13	49	86	−37	31	
7	CD Colegio Norte Viera	24	9	4	11	37	71	−34	31	
8	CF Vegueta Árbol Bonito	24	10	1	13	62	63	−1	31	
9	UJ Costa Ayala	24	8	2	14	61	109	−48	26	
10	UD Montaña Alta	24	7	1	16	52	103	−51	22	
11	Tagodor CD	24	4	1	19	24	150	−126	13	
12	CD Firgas	24	1	4	19	32	127	−95	7	
13	CF 5 Continentes	24	1	2	21	19	191	−172	5	

=== Group 6.2 ===
Pos	Team	Pld	W	D	L	GF	GA	GD	Pts	Qualification
1	UD Granadilla Tenerife Sur	24	24	0	0	219	3	+216	72	Qualification for title play-off
2	UD Tacuense	24	19	3	2	101	12	+89	60	Qualification for title play-off
3	CD Echedey	24	15	4	5	78	27	+51	49	
4	CD Laguna	24	15	4	5	71	20	+51	49	
5	CD Tarsa	24	11	5	8	60	30	+30	38	
6	CD Once Piratas	24	11	4	9	47	57	−10	37	
7	CD Charco del Pino	24	11	1	12	55	42	+13	34	
8	Atlético Tacoroente	24	9	5	10	59	57	+2	32	
9	CF Costa Adeje	24	9	4	11	44	61	−17	31	
10	CD Llamoro	24	7	2	15	29	71	−42	23	
11	CD Candela	24	4	3	17	31	104	−73	15	
12	UD San Antonio Pilar	24	3	0	21	19	172	−153	9	
13	Moneyba Hierro	24	0	1	23	11	168	−157	1	

=== Bracket ===
Semifinals
1	UD Tacuense	0	0	0
4	CD Femarguín	0	1	1
3	CD Achamán Santa Lucía	0	1	1
2	UD Granadilla Tenerife Sur	1	6	7

Finals
CD Femarguín	3	1	4
UD Granadilla Tenerife Sur	2	1	3

== Group 7 ==
Pos	Team	Pld	W	D	L	GF	GA	GD	Pts	Qualification or relegation
1	Sporting CF Plaza de Argel	26	19	3	4	82	32	+50	60	Qualification for promotion play-off
2	UD Aldaia	26	17	7	2	49	21	+28	58	runner-up
3	CFF Albacete	26	14	8	4	59	37	+22	50	
4	Valencia CF "B"	26	15	4	7	49	24	+25	49	
5	Levante UD "B"	26	15	3	8	45	29	+16	48	
6	CFF Marítim	26	12	7	7	49	32	+17	43	
7	Villarreal CF	26	11	4	11	48	39	+9	37	
8	Lorca FAD	26	9	4	13	36	50	−14	31	
9	Elche CF	26	8	6	12	28	39	−11	30	
10	CF Ciudad de Benidorm	26	8	4	14	37	51	−14	28	
11	Alhama CF	26	7	3	16	25	53	−28	24	
12	Murcia FCF	26	5	5	16	29	65	−36	20	Relegation to the 2015–16 Regional División
13	AF Cartagena Féminas	26	6	2	18	40	81	−41	20	Relegation to the 2015–16 Regional División
14	CFF Ciutat de Torrent	26	3	6	17	27	50	−23	15	Relegation to the 2015–16 Regional División

== Promotion playoffs ==
=== Bracket ===
Quarterfinals
1	Madrid CFF	4	0	4
8	Oiartzun KE	2	4	6
4	CD Fermaguín	2	0	2
5	FVPR El Olivo	1	1	2
2	UD Granadilla Tenerife Sur	3	0	3
7	FC Levante Las Planas	0	0	1
3	Sporting Plaza de Argel	1	1	2
6	Real Betis	4	7	11

Semifinals
Oiartzun KE	2	2	4
FVPR El Olivo	1	1	2
UD Granadilla Tenerife Sur	3	3	6
Real Betis	1	3	4

Promotion
Oiartzun KE
UD Granadilla Tenerife Sur

== Cup competitions ==
=== Copa de la Reina ===
17 May 2015
12:00 (CEST)

Sporting de Huelva	2–1	Valencia CF
Martín-Prieto 13', 84'	Report	Férez 64'

Estadio Municipal Álvarez Claro, Melilla
Referee: Samir Amar
