= 2015 UEFA Champions League final =

Football match in Berlin, Germany

- Match programme cover
- Event: 2014–15 UEFA Champions League
Juventus	Barcelona
(Italy)	(Spain)
1	3
- Date: 6 June 2015
- Venue: Olympiastadion, Berlin
- Man of the Match: Andrés Iniesta (Barcelona)
- Referee: Cüneyt Çakır (Turkey)
- Attendance: 70,442
- Weather: Partly cloudy 26 °C (79 °F); 49% humidity

The 2015 UEFA Champions League final was the final match of the 2014–15 UEFA Champions League, the 60th season of Europe's premier club football tournament organised by UEFA, and the 23rd season since it was renamed from the European Champion Clubs' Cup to the UEFA Champions League. It was played at the Olympiastadion in Berlin, Germany, on 6 June 2015, between Italian side Juventus and Spanish side Barcelona.

For the second time – after 2010 – both teams came into the final with the possibility of definitively winning a continental treble, having each won their national league and cup for the season. Barcelona scored the only goal of the first half after four minutes, through Ivan Rakitić. Ten minutes after the interval, Juventus equalised with a goal by Álvaro Morata. In the 68th minute, Luis Suárez put Barcelona back in the lead, and Barcelona's win was confirmed when Neymar scored with the last kick of the game. It was Barcelona's fifth trophy in the competition, and sealed their second treble, the other coming in 2009. It was also Juventus' sixth defeat in a European Cup final, the most by any club, a record they previously shared with Bayern Munich and Benfica.

As winners, Barcelona earned the right to play against the winners of the 2014–15 UEFA Europa League, Sevilla, in the 2015 UEFA Super Cup, and won that match 5–4. They also qualified to enter the 2015 FIFA Club World Cup in Japan as the UEFA representative, going on to beat Argentina's River Plate in the final.

== Venue ==
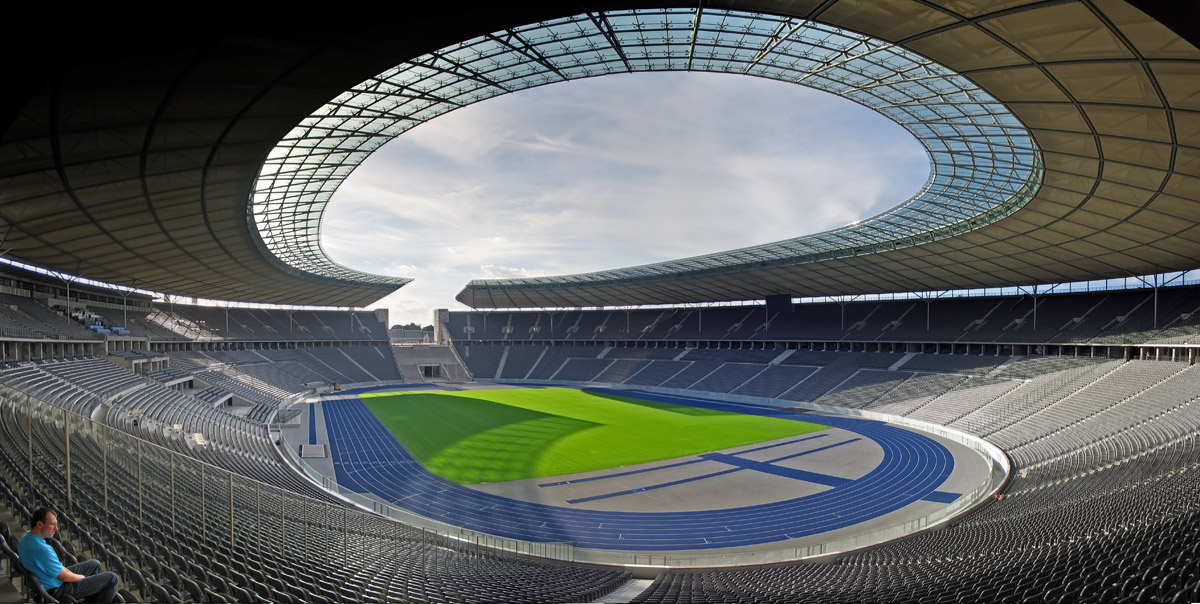
The Olympiastadion in Berlin hosted the final.

The Olympiastadion was announced as the venue for the final at the UEFA Executive Committee meeting in London on 23 May 2013. This was the first European Cup/Champions League final hosted in Berlin.

The current Olympiastadion was built for the 1936 Summer Olympics in the western part of the city. Since 1985, the stadium has hosted the finals of both the DFB-Pokal and its female equivalent. The Olympiastadion hosts the Internationales Stadionfest, which was an IAAF Golden League event from 1998 to 2009. The stadium hosted the 2009 World Championships in Athletics.

Aside from its use as an Olympic stadium, the Olympiastadion has a strong footballing tradition, having been the home of Hertha BSC since 1963. It was also used for three matches at the 1974 FIFA World Cup, and was renovated ahead of the 2006 tournament, at which it hosted six matches, including the final.

== Background ==
This was the eighth European Cup/UEFA Champions League final for both Juventus and Barcelona. Juventus won two of their previous finals (1985, 1996) and lost five (1973, 1983, 1997, 1998, 2003), while Barcelona won four of their previous finals (1992, 2006, 2009, 2011) and lost three (1961, 1986, 1994). Barcelona also played in six Cup Winners' Cup finals (winning in 1979, 1982, 1989, 1997, and losing in 1969, 1991), while Juventus also played in one Cup Winners' Cup final (winning in 1984) and four UEFA Cup finals (winning in 1977, 1990, 1993, and losing in 1995).

The two teams had previously played six times in UEFA club competitions, but never in a final. In their previous UEFA club competition meetings, Barcelona won 2–1 on aggregate in the 1985–86 European Cup quarter-finals and 3–2 on aggregate in the 1990–91 European Cup Winners' Cup semi-finals, while Juventus won 3–2 on aggregate in the 2002–03 UEFA Champions League quarter-finals. They also played in the 1952 Latin Cup semi-finals, won by Barcelona 4–2, and the 1970–71 Inter-Cities Fairs Cup second round, won by Juventus 4–2 on aggregate.

Similar to the 2010 UEFA Champions League final, both teams entered the final in the possibility of winning the treble of domestic league, domestic cup and Champions League titles. Juventus were crowned champions of the 2014–15 Serie A on 2 May, and won the 2015 Coppa Italia final eighteen days later. Barcelona were crowned champions of the 2014–15 La Liga on 17 May, and won the 2015 Copa del Rey final thirteen days later. While it would have been the first treble for Juventus, Barcelona had previously won the treble in 2008–09.

== Route to the final ==
Note: In all results below, the score of the finalist is given first (H: home; A: away).

(Italy) Juventus				Round	(Spain) Barcelona			
Opponent	Result			Group stage	Opponent	Result		
(Sweden) Malmö FF	2–0 (H)			Matchday 1	(Cyprus) APOEL	1–0 (H)		
(Spain) Atlético Madrid	0–1 (A)			Matchday 2	(France) Paris Saint-Germain	2–3 (A)		
(Greece) Olympiacos	0–1 (A)			Matchday 3	(Netherlands) Ajax	3–1 (H)		
(Greece) Olympiacos	3–2 (H)			Matchday 4	(Netherlands) Ajax	2–0 (A)		
(Sweden) Malmö FF	2–0 (A)			Matchday 5	(Cyprus) APOEL	4–0 (A)		
(Spain) Atlético Madrid	0–0 (H)			Matchday 6	(France) Paris Saint-Germain	3–1 (H)		
Group A runners-up: Pos / Team / Pld / Pts; 1 / (Spain) Atlético Madrid / 6 / 13; 2 / (Italy) Juventus / 6 / 10; 3 / (Greece) Olympiacos / 6 / 9; 4 / (Sweden) Malmö FF / 6 / 3; Source: UEFA				Final standings	Group F winners: Pos / Team / Pld / Pts; 1 / (Spain) Barcelona / 6 / 15; 2 / (France) Paris Saint-Germain / 6 / 13; 3 / (Netherlands) Ajax / 6 / 5; 4 / (Cyprus) APOEL / 6 / 1; Source: UEFA			
Opponent	Agg.	1st leg	2nd leg	Knockout phase	Opponent	Agg.	1st leg	2nd leg
(Germany) Borussia Dortmund	5–1	2–1 (H)	3–0 (A)	Round of 16	(England) Manchester City	3–1	2–1 (A)	1–0 (H)
(France) Monaco	1–0	1–0 (H)	0–0 (A)	Quarter-finals	(France) Paris Saint-Germain	5–1	3–1 (A)	2–0 (H)
(Spain) Real Madrid	3–2	2–1 (H)	1–1 (A)	Semi-finals	(Germany) Bayern Munich	5–3	3–0 (H)	2–3 (A)

=== Juventus ===
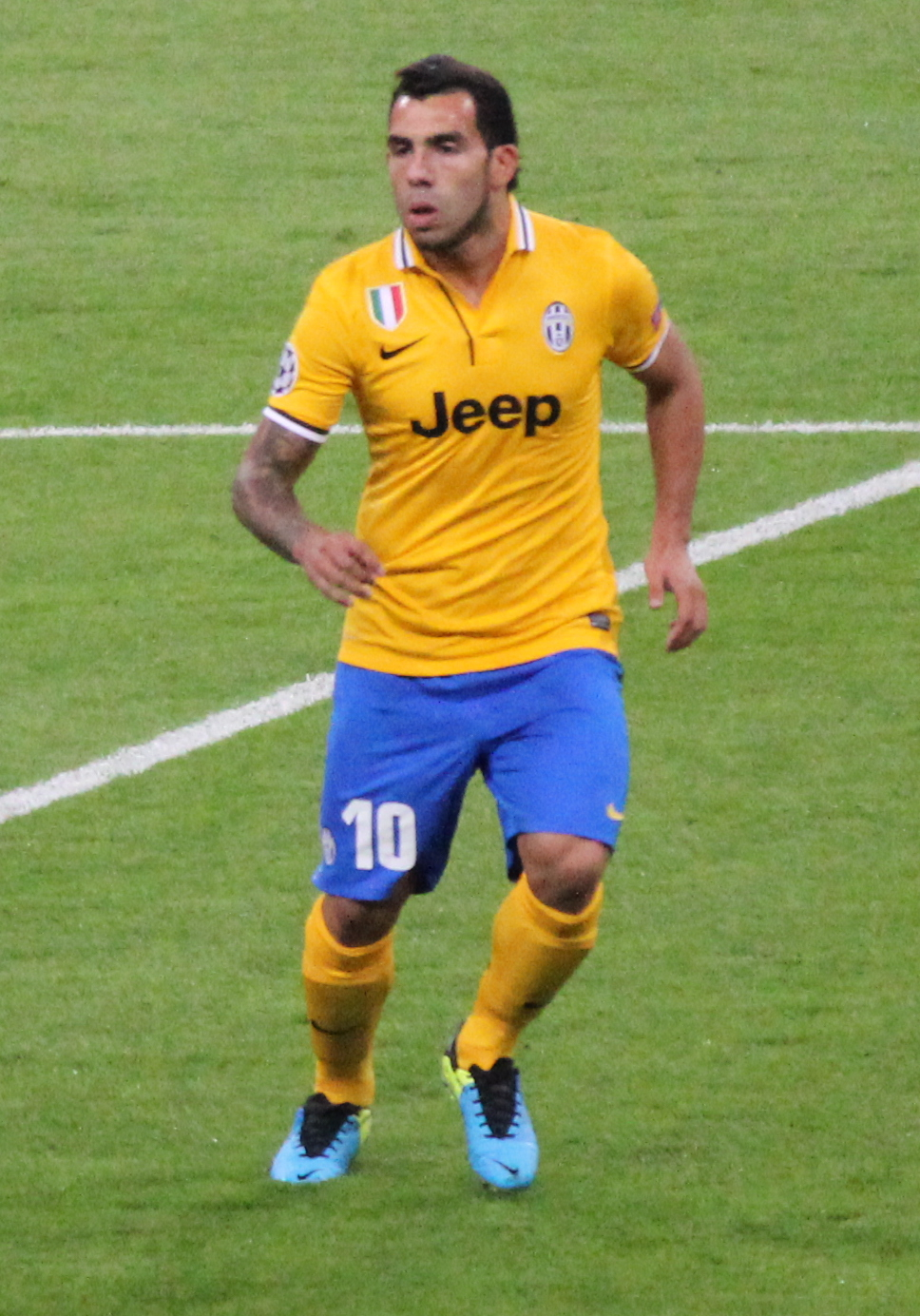
Carlos Tevez scored seven goals in Juventus' run to the final.

As winners of the 2013–14 Serie A, Juventus qualified automatically for the group stage. They were seeded second in Group A featuring – in seeded order – Atlético Madrid (champions of the 2013–14 La Liga), Olympiacos (champions of the 2013–14 Super League Greece), and Malmö FF (champions of the 2013 Allsvenskan).

Their campaign began on 16 September, hosting Malmö at the Juventus Stadium, winning 2–0 through second-half goals by Carlos Tevez. On 1 October, they travelled to face Atlético at the Vicente Calderón Stadium, losing by a sole goal from Arda Turan late on, a result that left all four teams level on three points apiece. Three weeks later Juventus again lost by one goal on their travels, Pajtim Kasami scoring in the first half for Olympiacos, whose goalkeeper Roberto played a key role. On 4 November, hosting the Greeks, Juventus won 3–2 after trailing 1–2, getting two goals in as many minutes from Roberto's own goal and Paul Pogba's winning strike.

On 26 November, Juventus won away for the first time in the group, with second-half goals from Fernando Llorente and Tevez at Malmö's Swedbank Stadion. In the final group game on 9 December, they hosted a goalless draw against Atlético, which sent both teams through, but Juventus in second place.

As group runners-up, Juventus had to face a group winner – Germans Borussia Dortmund of Group D – in the last 16. They won 2–1 at home in the first leg on 24 February 2015, with all the goals in the first half – visitor Marco Reus equalised either side of strikes from Tevez and Álvaro Morata. The same forwards were on target in the second leg at the Westfalenstadion on 18 March – Tevez scored twice, including in the third minute – as Juventus won 3–0, and 5–1 on aggregate.

In the quarter-finals, Juventus faced Monaco, runners-up in the 2013–14 Ligue 1. The only goal of the tie came in the first leg at home on 14 April, Arturo Vidal scoring a penalty kick after Ricardo Carvalho tripped Morata. It was their first advancement into the semi-finals for 12 years.

On 5 May, Juventus hosted reigning champions Real Madrid at Juventus Stadium. Morata opened the scoring against his former team, and Cristiano Ronaldo equalised before half time. Tevez scored the winning goal from the penalty spot after he was fouled by Dani Carvajal. Eight days later, the two teams drew at the Santiago Bernabéu Stadium: Ronaldo scored a penalty after Giorgio Chiellini fouled James Rodríguez, but in the second half Morata equalised. Juventus advanced to the final 3–2 on aggregate.

=== Barcelona ===
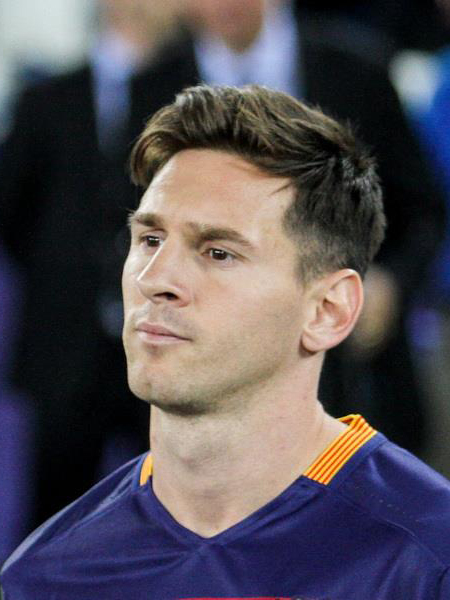
Lionel Messi scored ten times in Barcelona's progress to the final, including a hat-trick away to APOEL.

Barcelona qualified for the group stage as runners-up to Atlético in the previous season's La Liga. They were the top seeds in Group F, alongside – in order – Paris Saint-Germain (winners of the 2013–14 Ligue 1), Ajax (winners of the 2013–14 Eredivisie) and APOEL (winners of the 2013–14 Cypriot First Division).

In their first game of the group, defender Gerard Piqué headed the only goal to defeat APOEL at the Camp Nou on 17 September. However, thirteen days later at the Parc des Princes, they fell 3–2 to Paris Saint-Germain. On 21 October, Barcelona hosted Ajax and got first-half goals through Neymar and Lionel Messi; Anwar El Ghazi scored for the visitors with two minutes to play but Sandro's added-time strike confirmed a 3–1 win. Barcelona travelled to the Amsterdam Arena on 5 November and defeated Ajax 2–0 with a Messi goal in each half; he equalled the tournament's record of 71 overall goals.

On 25 November, Barcelona played APOEL at the GSP Stadium in Nicosia, winning 4–0 with a hat-trick from Messi and a further goal from Luis Suárez; Messi became the competition's all-time top scorer. Barcelona won the group with a 3–1 home win over PSG on 10 December. They initially fell behind to a goal by Zlatan Ibrahimović, but replied with a goal each from the South American forward line of Messi, Neymar and Suárez.

In the last 16, Barcelona faced Manchester City, winners of the 2013–14 Premier League and Group E runners-up. In the first leg at the City of Manchester Stadium on 24 February 2015, Suárez scored twice in the first 30 minutes, and Sergio Agüero got a goal back for the hosts after the break. In the return game on 18 March, City goalkeeper Joe Hart limited Barcelona to a single goal by Ivan Rakitić, and Barcelona advanced 3–1 on aggregate.

Barcelona met PSG again in the quarter-finals. On 15 April in Paris, Neymar scored the only goal of the first half and Suárez added two more, with the hosts getting a consolation through Jérémy Mathieu's own goal. Six days later, two first-half goals from Neymar sealed a 5–1 aggregate win.

In the semi-finals, Barcelona's opponents were Bayern Munich, winners of the 2013–14 Bundesliga. They hosted the first leg on 6 May, breaking the deadlock with two late goals from Messi in a three-minute spell, and an added-time addition by Neymar. Six days later at the Allianz Arena, Bayern took the lead through Medhi Benatia, and Neymar put Barcelona into the lead by half time. Second-half goals by Robert Lewandowski and Thomas Müller gave Bayern a 3–2 win on the night, but Barcelona advanced 5–3 on aggregate.

== Pre-match ==
=== Ambassador ===
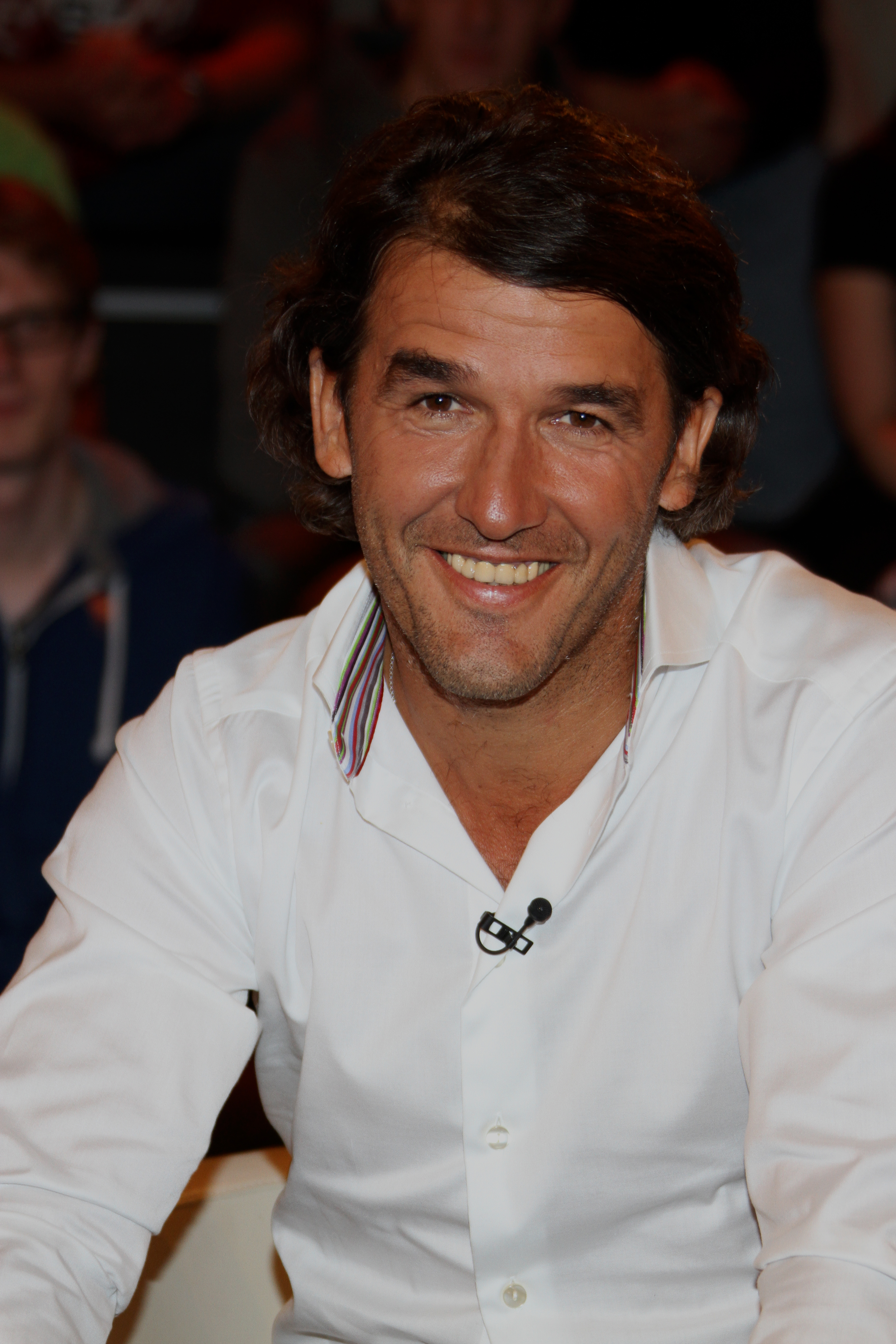
Karl-Heinz Riedle was named as the ambassador for the final.

Former Germany international player Karl-Heinz Riedle, who won the Champions League with Borussia Dortmund against Juventus in 1997, was named the ambassador for the final.

=== Logo ===
UEFA unveiled the visual identity of the final on 29 August 2014. It blends the stadium with the city's Brandenburg Gate.

=== Ticketing ===
With a stadium capacity of 70,500, a total amount of 46,000 tickets were available to fans and the general public, with the two finalist teams receiving 20,000 tickets each and with 6,000 tickets being available for sale to fans worldwide via UEFA.com from 5 to 23 March 2015 in four price categories: €390, €280, €160, and €70. The rest of 24,500 tickets were allocated to sponsors and officials.

=== Related events ===
The 2015 UEFA Women's Champions League final was held on 14 May 2015 at the Friedrich-Ludwig-Jahn-Sportpark in Berlin. Unlike recent years, in which the Women's Champions League final was held in the same week as the men's Champions League final, the two matches are separated by almost a month, as the 2015 FIFA Women's World Cup started in early June.

The annual UEFA Champions Festival was held between 4–7 June 2015 in the streets around Brandenburg Gate.

=== Opening ceremony ===
The UEFA Champions League Anthem is performed by German soprano Nina Maria Fischer and Spanish tenor Manuel Gomez Ruiz, the first time it had been performed as a duet.

== Match ==
=== Officials ===
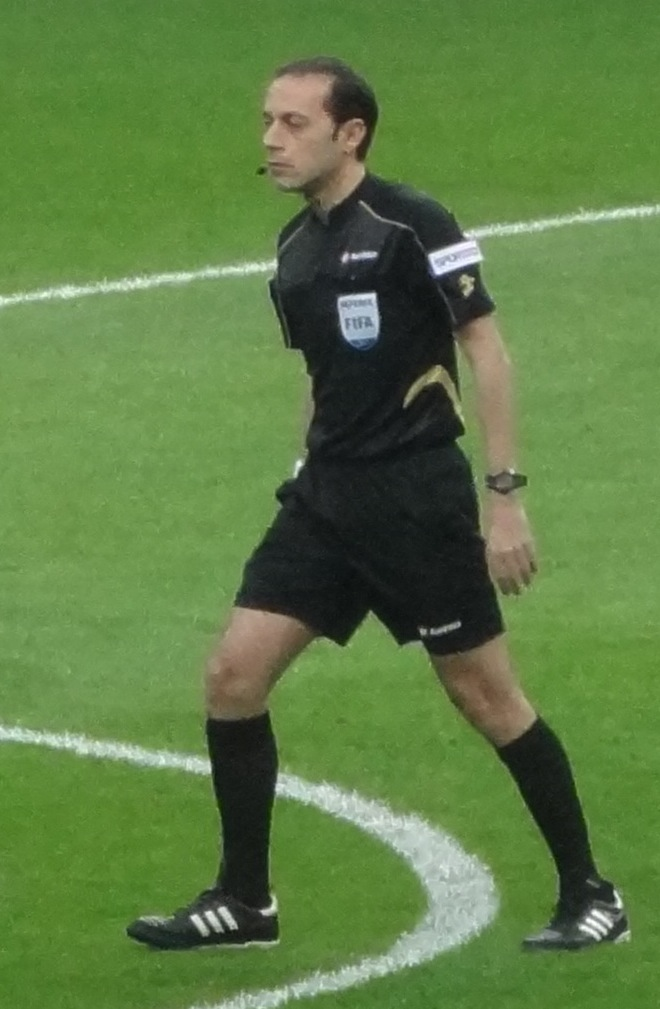
Cüneyt Çakır was the final's referee.

In May 2015, the officials were chosen for the final by UEFA, led by Turkish referee Cüneyt Çakır. His compatriots Bahattin Duran and Tarık Ongun were chosen as assistant referees, and fellow Turks Hüseyin Göçek and Barış Şimşek the additional assistants, with Mustafa Emre Eyisoy the reserve assistant. Jonas Eriksson, of Sweden, was chosen as fourth official. Çakır is a UEFA elite referee, and has refereed at UEFA Euro 2012 and the 2014 FIFA World Cup, as well as the 2012 FIFA Club World Cup Final.

Çakır was scrutinised by the British media in 2013 when he sent off Manchester United's Nani in a Champions League round of 16 match and the English team went on to lose to Real Madrid. Manager Alex Ferguson was so enraged by the decision that he refused to speak to the media after the game. UEFA confirmed that no action would be taken against the referee, concluding that he made the correct judgement.

=== Team selection ===
Juventus defender Giorgio Chiellini was ruled out of the final with a calf injury picked up in training on 3 June. Barcelona had no injury concerns before the final.

Barcelona's Luis Suárez had previously been involved in two controversies with players in the Juventus squad: in 2012, he was found guilty by an FA commission of using racially insulting language towards Patrice Evra in a game between their respective former clubs Liverpool and Manchester United, and at the 2014 FIFA World Cup he escaped punishment for biting Chiellini but was punished retrospectively. Evra stated that he would shake Suárez's hand before the game, after Suarez had refused to shake his hand in their last match.

=== Summary ===
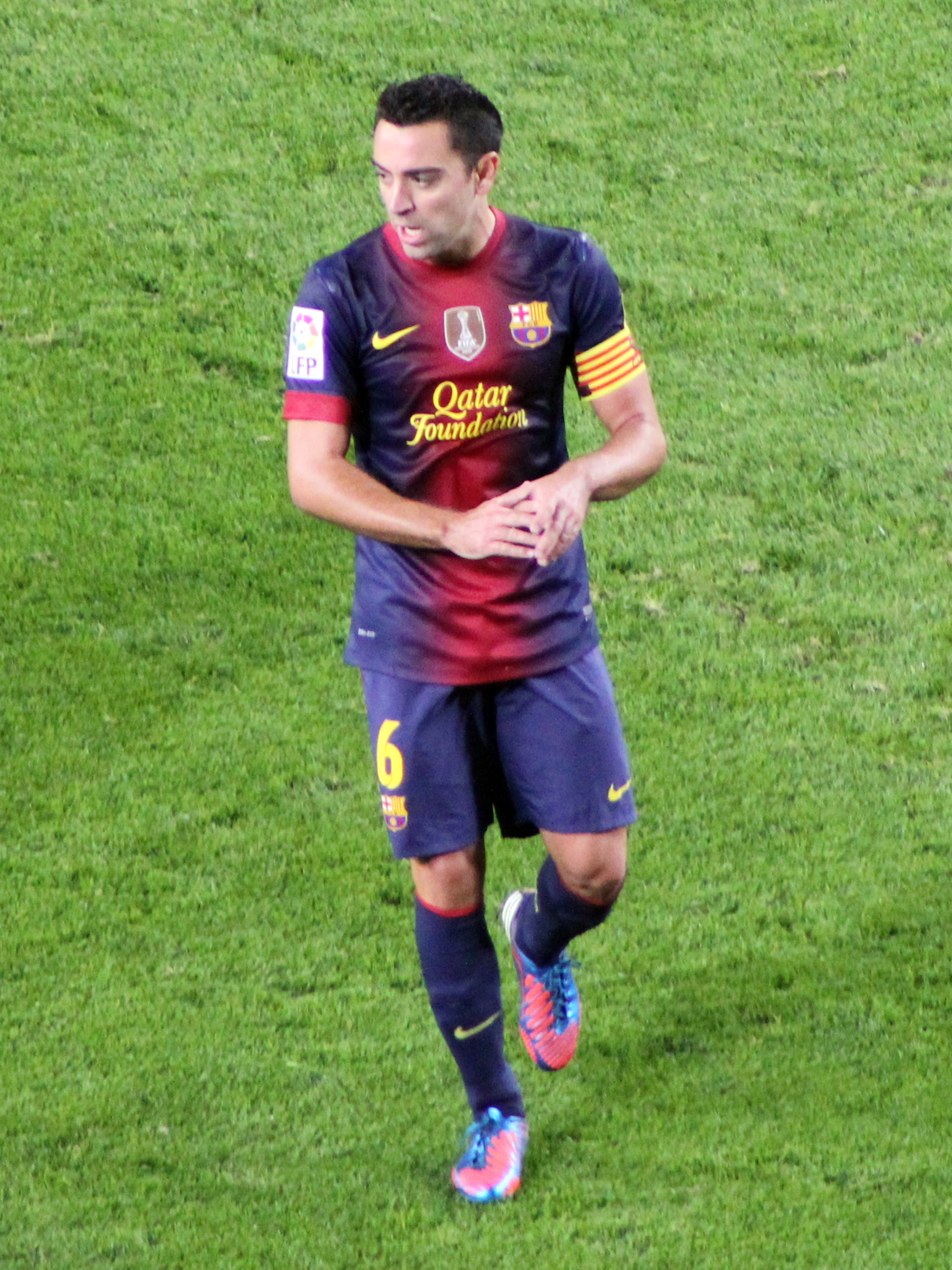
Xavi came on as a substitute for the last of his 767 Barcelona appearances.

In the second minute, Barcelona's Javier Mascherano conceded a corner kick, which Juventus aimed at Evra but Barcelona cleared it. However two minutes later, Jordi Alba made a run on Barcelona's left, passing to Neymar and then Andrés Iniesta who set up Ivan Rakitić to score the first goal from close range. Rakitić's goal was Barcelona's fastest goal in a Champions League final, and the fourth fastest in a Champions League final overall. In the 11th minute, Arturo Vidal of Juventus received the first yellow card for fouling Sergio Busquets. At half time, Barcelona led 1–0.

Ten minutes into the second half, Juventus equalised: Claudio Marchisio back-heeled the ball to right-back Stephan Lichtsteiner, who set up Carlos Tevez. Barcelona goalkeeper Marc-André ter Stegen blocked the shot from Tevez, but Álvaro Morata levelled the scores by putting the rebound into the net. In the 67th minute, Juventus appealed for a penalty when Paul Pogba went down in the area when challenged by Dani Alves, but the referee did not give it. Two minutes later, Barcelona took the lead again when Lionel Messi shot from the edge of the area, Gianluigi Buffon blocked it and Suárez put in the rebound. Soon after, Neymar put the ball into the net from Alba's cross, but it was disallowed as the referee deemed that Neymar had headed it into his own hand.

In the 78th minute, Barcelona substituted Iniesta, who gave his captain's armband to Xavi, making his 767th and final appearance for Barcelona. Soon after, Juventus made three substitutions in quick succession: Vidal was replaced with Roberto Pereyra and Morata with Fernando Llorente, while Evra made way for Kingsley Coman. In added time, Barcelona made their final two changes, as Rakitić made way for Jérémy Mathieu and the limping Suárez for Pedro. In the final added minute, Alves handled the ball near the halfway line, and Juventus launched the resulting free kick towards the Barcelona goal, where it was cleared. The ensuing counter-attack ended with Pedro giving an assist to Neymar, who scored the final kick to make it 3–1.

=== Details ===
6 June 2015
20:45 UTC+2

Juventus (Italy)	1–3	(Spain) Barcelona
Morata 55'	Report	Rakitić 4'; Suárez 68'; Neymar 90+7'

Olympiastadion, Berlin
Attendance: 70,442
Referee: Cüneyt Çakır (Turkey)

Juventus	Barcelona

GK	1	(Italy) Gianluigi Buffon (c)
RB	26	(Switzerland) Stephan Lichtsteiner
CB	15	(Italy) Andrea Barzagli
CB	19	(Italy) Leonardo Bonucci
LB	33	(France) Patrice Evra		(substituted off) 89'
DM	21	(Italy) Andrea Pirlo
CM	8	(Italy) Claudio Marchisio
CM	6	(France) Paul Pogba	(yellow card) 41'
AM	23	(Chile) Arturo Vidal	(yellow card) 11'	(substituted off) 79'
CF	10	(Argentina) Carlos Tevez
CF	9	(Spain) Álvaro Morata		(substituted off) 85'
Substitutes:
GK	30	(Italy) Marco Storari
DF	5	(Italy) Angelo Ogbonna
MF	11	(France) Kingsley Coman		(substituted on) 89'
MF	20	(Italy) Simone Padoin
MF	27	(Italy) Stefano Sturaro
MF	37	(Argentina) Roberto Pereyra		(substituted on) 79'
FW	14	(Spain) Fernando Llorente		(substituted on) 85'
Manager:
(Italy) Massimiliano Allegri

GK	1	(Germany) Marc-André ter Stegen
RB	22	(Brazil) Dani Alves
CB	3	(Spain) Gerard Piqué
CB	14	(Argentina) Javier Mascherano
LB	18	(Spain) Jordi Alba
CM	4	(Croatia) Ivan Rakitić		(substituted off) 90+1'
CM	5	(Spain) Sergio Busquets
CM	8	(Spain) Andrés Iniesta (c)		(substituted off) 78'
RF	10	(Argentina) Lionel Messi
CF	9	(Uruguay) Luis Suárez	(yellow card) 70'	(substituted off) 90+6'
LF	11	(Brazil) Neymar
Substitutes:
GK	13	(Chile) Claudio Bravo
DF	15	(Spain) Marc Bartra
DF	21	(Brazil) Adriano
DF	24	(France) Jérémy Mathieu		(substituted on) 90+1'
MF	6	(Spain) Xavi		(substituted on) 78'
MF	12	(Brazil) Rafinha
FW	7	(Spain) Pedro		(substituted on) 90+6'
Manager:
(Spain) Luis Enrique

Man of the Match:
Andrés Iniesta (Barcelona)

Assistant referees:
Bahattin Duran (Turkey)
Tarık Ongun (Turkey)
Fourth official:
Jonas Eriksson (Sweden)
Additional assistant referees:
Hüseyin Göçek (Turkey)
Barış Şimşek (Turkey)
Reserve assistant referee:
Mustafa Emre Eyisoy (Turkey)

Match rules

- 90 minutes
- 30 minutes of extra time if necessary
- Penalty shoot-out if scores still level
- Seven named substitutes, of which up to three may be used

=== Statistics ===
First half
Statistic	Juventus	Barcelona
Goals scored	0	1
Total shots	5	8
Shots on target	1	4
Saves	3	1
Ball possession	34%	66%
Corner kicks	3	3
Fouls committed	15	4
Offsides	0	0
Yellow cards	2	0
Red cards	0	0

Second half
Statistic	Juventus	Barcelona
Goals scored	1	2
Total shots	9	10
Shots on target	5	4
Saves	2	4
Ball possession	44%	56%
Corner kicks	5	3
Fouls committed	9	8
Offsides	1	0
Yellow cards	0	1
Red cards	0	0

Overall
Statistic	Juventus	Barcelona
Goals scored	1	3
Total shots	14	18
Shots on target	6	8
Saves	5	5
Ball possession	39%	61%
Corner kicks	8	6
Fouls committed	24	12
Offsides	1	0
Yellow cards	2	1
Red cards	0	0

== Post-match ==
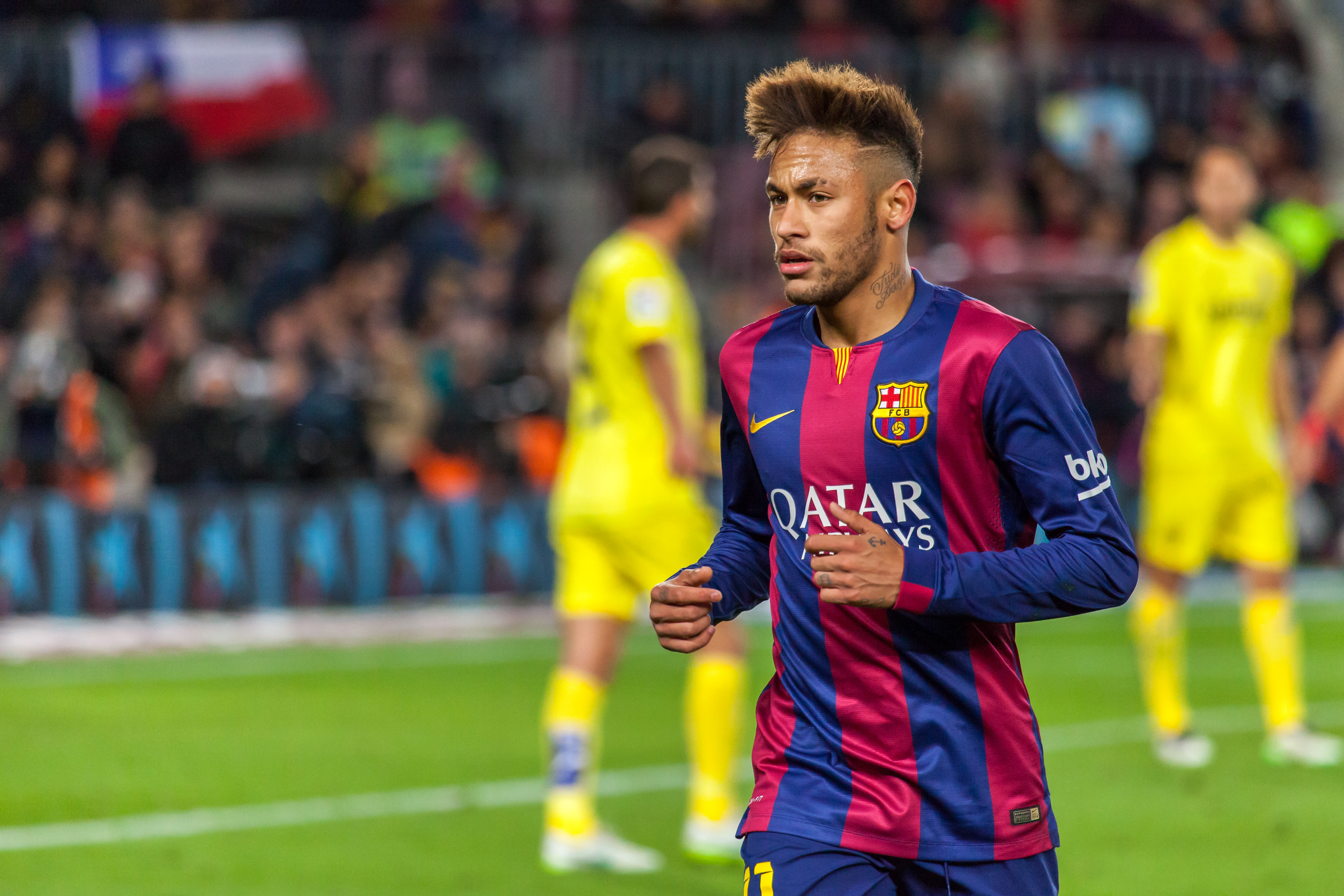
Neymar's tenth goal of the season in the final meant that three players shared the honour of top scorer.

With the win, Barcelona became the first European club to achieve the treble twice. Their fifth European title put them joint third with Bayern Munich and Liverpool, until Liverpool won the 2019 final to achieve their sixth title. Bayern also went on to win their sixth trophy a year later, in the 2020 final. If only the Champions League era is considered, this is their fourth title, putting them one title behind Real Madrid. Madrid extended their lead by winning a fifth title in 2016 and, as of 2024, they have won nine titles in the Champions League era.

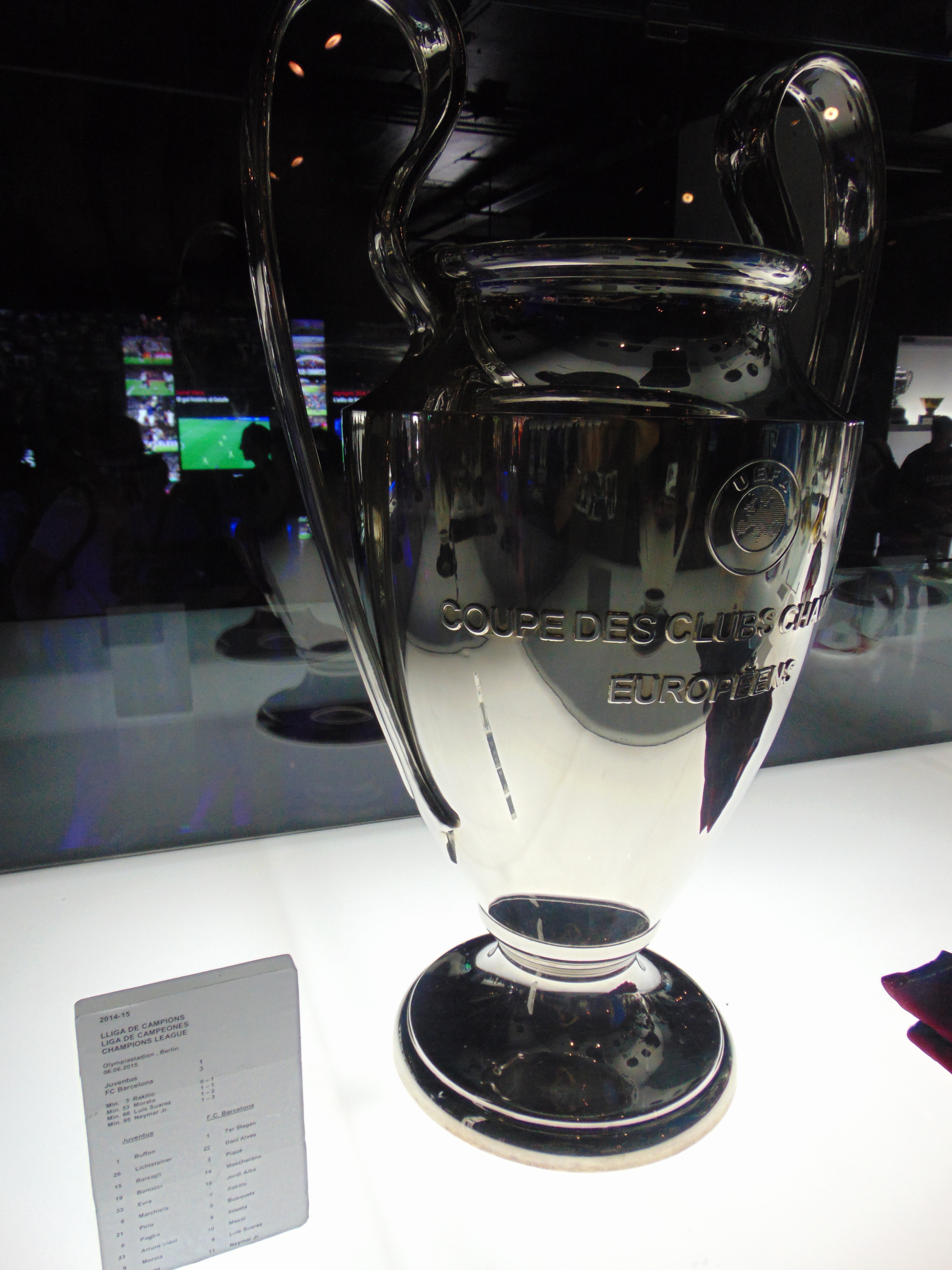
The UEFA Champions League trophy in FC Barcelona Museum.

On the other hand, Juventus became the first team to lose six finals: they previously shared the record with Benfica and Bayern Munich. Patrice Evra became the first player to play in four losing UEFA Champions League finals, having previously been a runner-up in 2004 (with Monaco), 2009 and 2011 (both with Manchester United).

Neymar's goal meant that three players shared the title of top scorer in the competition, alongside Messi and Cristiano Ronaldo. He became the first player since Kaká in 2006–07 to be top scorer apart from those two. Messi was the top assister with six, with Ronaldo among the runners-up with four. After the final, both Messi and Ronaldo had a record 77 Champions League goals, but Ronaldo had one more if qualifiers were to be included.

=== Reactions ===
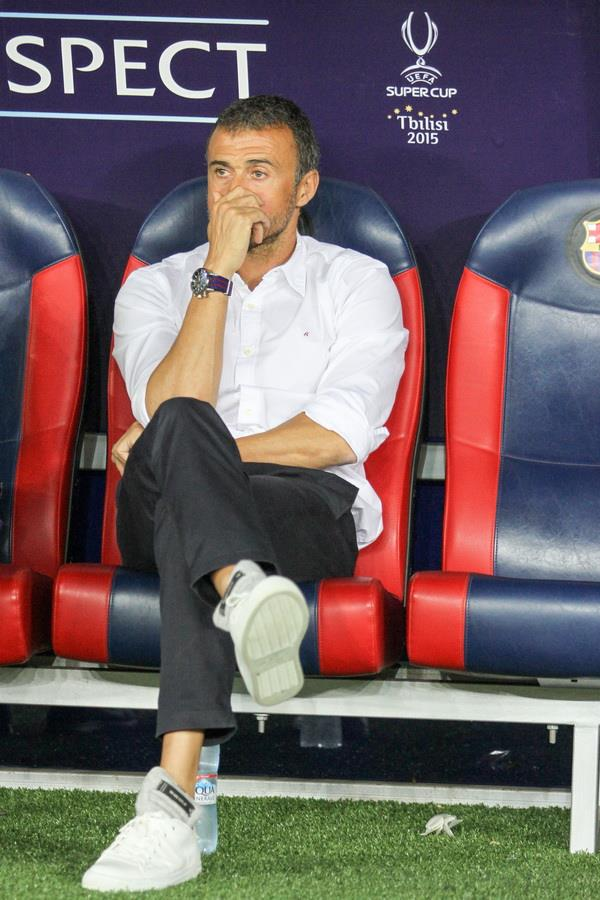
Despite his victory, there was uncertainty whether Barcelona manager Luis Enrique would remain in his position.

Speaking to Canal+ after his final game for Barcelona, Xavi said he felt nostalgic knowing that he would never play for the team again, but deemed it "incredible" to win the Champions League in his last appearance. He admitted that Barcelona had been shaken by Juventus' equaliser, but had recovered through Messi doing "his thing". Xavi praised manager Luis Enrique for his successes despite his disputes with the club's board; there was uncertainty whether Luis Enrique would remain in his position for the following season.

Luis Enrique called the final "spectacular", and his team's opponents "absolutely top-level". Of the Juventus team, he singled out Buffon for praise. In his own side, he commented that Neymar had gone from "very, very good" in his previous season, to "spectacular" in this one, ranking him among the world's best players. Luis Enrique stated that Suárez' performances had been worth the money Barcelona paid for him, despite initial doubt whether he would adapt to a new team. In spite of Barcelona's treble, the manager concluded that it had been "a difficult year, a transitional year".

Juventus manager Massimiliano Allegri praised his team for their efforts, and said that despite a few regrets, they could exit with confidence from their performance. He commented that the team reaching the final had inspired the city of Turin and the whole of Italy. Allegri added that to improve on the season would not mean winning a treble, but remaining within Europe's top 8 teams for the future.

=== Subsequent matches ===
After winning the final, Barcelona qualified for the 2015 UEFA Super Cup against compatriots Sevilla, winners of the 2014–15 UEFA Europa League. In the match on 11 August in Tbilisi, Georgia, Barcelona won 5–4 with Pedro scoring an extra-time winner. It was their fifth win in the competition, equalling Milan's record.

In December, Barcelona travelled to Japan as Europe's representative in the 2015 FIFA Club World Cup. They defeated China's Guangzhou Evergrande 3–0 in the semi-finals and River Plate of Argentina by the same score in the final. It was a record third win in the competition, and their fifth trophy of the calendar year.

== See also ==
- 2015 UEFA Europa League final
- 2015 UEFA Women's Champions League final
- 2014–15 FC Barcelona season
- 2014–15 Juventus FC season
- FC Barcelona in international football
- Football in Berlin
- Juventus FC in international football
