= 2014–15 UEFA Champions League knockout phase =

International football competition

The 2014–15 UEFA Champions League knockout phase began on 17 February and concluded on 6 June 2015 with the final at Olympiastadion in Berlin, Germany to decide the champions of the 2014–15 UEFA Champions League. A total of 16 teams competed in the knockout phase.

Times are CET/CEST, (Note: CET (UTC+1) for matches to 18 March 2015, and CEST (UTC+2) for matches from 14 April 2015.) as listed by UEFA (local times, if different, are in parentheses).

== Round and draw dates ==
All draws were held at UEFA headquarters in Nyon, Switzerland.

Round	Draw date and time	First leg	Second leg
Round of 16	15 December 2014, 12:00	17–18 & 24–25 February 2015	10–11 & 17–18 March 2015
Quarter-finals	20 March 2015, 12:00	14–15 April 2015	21–22 April 2015
Semi-finals	24 April 2015, 12:00	5–6 May 2015	12–13 May 2015
Final	24 April 2015, 12:00	6 June 2015 at Olympiastadion, Berlin	

== Format ==
The knockout phase involved the 16 teams which qualified as winners and runners-up of each of the eight groups in the group stage.

Each tie in the knockout phase, apart from the final, was played over two legs, with each team playing one leg at home. The team that scored more goals on aggregate over the two legs advanced to the next round. If the aggregate score was level, the away goals rule was applied, i.e. the team that scored more goals away from home over the two legs advanced. If away goals were also equal, then thirty minutes of extra time was played. The away goals rule was again applied after extra time, i.e. if there were goals scored during extra time and the aggregate score was still level, the visiting team advanced by virtue of more away goals scored. If no goals were scored during extra time, the tie was decided by penalty shoot-out. In the final, which was played as a single match, if scores were level at the end of normal time, extra time was played, followed by penalty shoot-out if scores remained tied.

The mechanism of the draws for each round was as follows:

- In the draw for the round of 16, the eight group winners were seeded, and the eight group runners-up were unseeded. The seeded teams were drawn against the unseeded teams, with the seeded teams hosting the second leg. Teams from the same group or the same association must not be drawn against each other.
- In the draws for the quarter-finals onwards, there were no seedings, and teams from the same group or the same association could be drawn against each other.

== Qualified teams ==
Group	Winners (Seeded in round of 16 draw)	Runners-up (Unseeded in round of 16 draw)
A	(Spain) Atlético Madrid	(Italy) Juventus
B	(Spain) Real Madrid	(Switzerland) Basel
C	(France) Monaco	(Germany) Bayer Leverkusen
D	(Germany) Borussia Dortmund	(England) Arsenal
E	(Germany) Bayern Munich	(England) Manchester City
F	(Spain) Barcelona	(France) Paris Saint-Germain
G	(England) Chelsea	(Germany) Schalke 04
H	(Portugal) Porto	(Ukraine) Shakhtar Donetsk

== Bracket ==
Round of 16
(Italy) Juventus	2	3	5
(Germany) Borussia Dortmund	1	0	1
(England) Arsenal	1	2	3
(France) Monaco (a)	3	0	3
(Germany) Bayer Leverkusen	1	0	1 (2)
(Spain) Atlético Madrid (p)	0	1	1 (3)
(Germany) Schalke 04	0	4	4
(Spain) Real Madrid	2	3	5
(France) Paris Saint-Germain (a.e.t.; a)	1	2	3
(England) Chelsea	1	2	3
(England) Manchester City	1	0	1
(Spain) Barcelona	2	1	3
(Switzerland) Basel	1	0	1
(Portugal) Porto	1	4	5
(Ukraine) Shakhtar Donetsk	0	0	0
(Germany) Bayern Munich	0	7	7

Quarter-finals
(Italy) Juventus	1	0	1
(France) Monaco	0	0	0
(Spain) Atlético Madrid	0	0	0
(Spain) Real Madrid	0	1	1
(France) Paris Saint-Germain	1	0	1
(Spain) Barcelona	3	2	5
(Portugal) Porto	3	1	4
(Germany) Bayern Munich	1	6	7

Semi-finals
(Italy) Juventus	2	1	3
(Spain) Real Madrid	1	1	2
(Spain) Barcelona	3	2	5
(Germany) Bayern Munich	0	3	3

Final
6 June – Berlin
(Italy) Juventus	1
(Spain) Barcelona	3

== Round of 16 ==
The draw was held on 15 December 2014. The first legs were played on 17, 18, 24 and 25 February, and the second legs were played on 10, 11, 17 and 18 March 2015.

=== Summary ===
Team 1	Agg.	Team 2	1st leg	2nd leg
Paris Saint-Germain (France)	3–3 (a)	(England) Chelsea	1–1	2–2 (a.e.t.)
Manchester City (England)	1–3	(Spain) Barcelona	1–2	0–1
Bayer Leverkusen (Germany)	1–1 (2–3 p)	(Spain) Atlético Madrid	1–0	0–1 (a.e.t.)
Juventus (Italy)	5–1	(Germany) Borussia Dortmund	2–1	3–0
Schalke 04 (Germany)	4–5	(Spain) Real Madrid	0–2	4–3
Shakhtar Donetsk (Ukraine)	0–7	(Germany) Bayern Munich	0–0	0–7
Arsenal (England)	3–3 (a)	(France) Monaco	1–3	2–0
Basel (Switzerland)	1–5	(Portugal) Porto	1–1	0–4

=== Matches ===
17 February 2015
20:45

Paris Saint-Germain (France)	1–1	(England) Chelsea
Cavani 54'	Report	Ivanović 36'

Parc des Princes, Paris
Attendance: 46,146
Referee: Cüneyt Çakır (Turkey)
11 March 2015
20:45 (19:45 UTC+0)

Chelsea (England)	2–2 (a.e.t.)	(France) Paris Saint-Germain
Cahill 81'; Hazard 96' (pen.)	Report	David Luiz 86'; Thiago Silva 114'

Stamford Bridge, London
Attendance: 37,692
Referee: Björn Kuipers (Netherlands)

3–3 on aggregate; Paris Saint-Germain won on away goals.

24 February 2015
20:45 (19:45 UTC+0)

Manchester City (England)	1–2	(Spain) Barcelona
Agüero 69'	Report	Suárez 16', 30'

City of Manchester Stadium, Manchester
Attendance: 45,081
Referee: Felix Brych (Germany)
18 March 2015
20:45

Barcelona (Spain)	1–0	(England) Manchester City
Rakitić 31'	Report

Camp Nou, Barcelona
Attendance: 92,551
Referee: Gianluca Rocchi (Italy)

Barcelona won 3–1 on aggregate.

25 February 2015
20:45

Bayer Leverkusen (Germany)	1–0	(Spain) Atlético Madrid
Çalhanoğlu 57'	Report

BayArena, Leverkusen
Attendance: 29,079
Referee: Pavel Královec (Czech Republic)
17 March 2015
20:45

Atlético Madrid (Spain)	1–0 (a.e.t.)	(Germany) Bayer Leverkusen
Suárez 27'	Report
Penalties
García (penalty missed); Griezmann (penalty scored); Suárez (penalty scored); Koke (penalty missed); Torres (penalty scored)	3–2	(penalty missed) Çalhanoğlu; (penalty scored) Rolfes; (penalty missed) Toprak; (penalty scored) Castro; (penalty missed) Kießling

Vicente Calderón, Madrid
Attendance: 48,273
Referee: Nicola Rizzoli (Italy)

1–1 on aggregate; Atlético Madrid won 3–2 on penalties.

24 February 2015
20:45

Juventus (Italy)	2–1	(Germany) Borussia Dortmund
Tevez 13'; Morata 43'	Report	Reus 18'

Juventus Stadium, Turin
Attendance: 41,182
Referee: Antonio Mateu Lahoz (Spain)
18 March 2015
20:45

Borussia Dortmund (Germany)	0–3	(Italy) Juventus
	Report	Tevez 3', 79'; Morata 70'

Westfalenstadion, Dortmund
Attendance: 65,851
Referee: Milorad Mažić (Serbia)

Juventus won 5–1 on aggregate.

18 February 2015
20:45

Schalke 04 (Germany)	0–2	(Spain) Real Madrid
	Report	Ronaldo 26'; Marcelo 79'

Arena AufSchalke, Gelsenkirchen
Attendance: 54,442
Referee: Martin Atkinson (England)
10 March 2015
20:45

Real Madrid (Spain)	3–4	(Germany) Schalke 04
Ronaldo 25', 45'; Benzema 53'	Report	Fuchs 20'; Huntelaar 40', 84'; Sané 57'

Santiago Bernabéu, Madrid
Attendance: 69,986
Referee: Damir Skomina (Slovenia)

Real Madrid won 5–4 on aggregate.

17 February 2015
20:45 (21:45 UTC+2)

Shakhtar Donetsk (Ukraine)	0–0	(Germany) Bayern Munich
	Report

Arena Lviv, Lviv (Note: Shakhtar Donetsk played their home matches at Arena Lviv, Lviv, instead of their regular stadium, the Donbas Arena in Donetsk, due to the war in Donbas.)
Attendance: 34,187
Referee: Alberto Undiano Mallenco (Spain)
11 March 2015
20:45

Bayern Munich (Germany)	7–0	(Ukraine) Shakhtar Donetsk
Müller 4' (pen.), 52'; Boateng 34'; Ribéry 49'; Badstuber 63'; Lewandowski 75'; Götze 87'	Report

Allianz Arena, Munich
Attendance: 70,000
Referee: Willie Collum (Scotland)

Bayern Munich won 7–0 on aggregate.

25 February 2015
20:45 (19:45 UTC+0)

Arsenal (England)	1–3	(France) Monaco
Oxlade-Chamberlain 90+1'	Report	Kondogbia 38'; Berbatov 53'; Carrasco 90+4'

Emirates Stadium, London
Attendance: 59,868
Referee: Deniz Aytekin (Germany)
17 March 2015
20:45

Monaco (France)	0–2	(England) Arsenal
	Report	Giroud 36'; Ramsey 79'

Stade Louis II, Monaco
Attendance: 17,263
Referee: Svein Oddvar Moen (Norway)

3–3 on aggregate; Monaco won on away goals.

18 February 2015
20:45

Basel (Switzerland)	1–1	(Portugal) Porto
González 11'	Report	Danilo 79' (pen.)

St. Jakob-Park, Basel
Attendance: 34,464
Referee: Mark Clattenburg (England)
10 March 2015
20:45 (19:45 UTC+0)

Porto (Portugal)	4–0	(Switzerland) Basel
Brahimi 14'; Herrera 47'; Casemiro 56'; Aboubakar 76'	Report

Estádio do Dragão, Porto
Attendance: 43,108
Referee: Jonas Eriksson (Sweden)

Porto won 5–1 on aggregate.

== Quarter-finals ==
The draw was held on 20 March 2015. The first legs were played on 14 and 15 April, and the second legs were played on 21 and 22 April 2015.

=== Summary ===
Team 1	Agg.	Team 2	1st leg	2nd leg
Paris Saint-Germain (France)	1–5	(Spain) Barcelona	1–3	0–2
Atlético Madrid (Spain)	0–1	(Spain) Real Madrid	0–0	0–1
Porto (Portugal)	4–7	(Germany) Bayern Munich	3–1	1–6
Juventus (Italy)	1–0	(France) Monaco	1–0	0–0

=== Matches ===
15 April 2015
20:45

Paris Saint-Germain (France)	1–3	(Spain) Barcelona
Mathieu 82' (o.g.)	Report	Neymar 18'; Suárez 67', 79'

Parc des Princes, Paris
Attendance: 45,893
Referee: Mark Clattenburg (England)
21 April 2015
20:45

Barcelona (Spain)	2–0	(France) Paris Saint-Germain
Neymar 14', 34'	Report

Camp Nou, Barcelona
Attendance: 84,477
Referee: Svein Oddvar Moen (Norway)

Barcelona won 5–1 on aggregate.

14 April 2015
20:45

Atlético Madrid (Spain)	0–0	(Spain) Real Madrid
	Report

Vicente Calderón, Madrid
Attendance: 52,553
Referee: Milorad Mažić (Serbia)
22 April 2015
20:45

Real Madrid (Spain)	1–0	(Spain) Atlético Madrid
Hernández 88'	Report

Santiago Bernabéu, Madrid
Attendance: 78,300
Referee: Felix Brych (Germany)

Real Madrid won 1–0 on aggregate.

15 April 2015
20:45 (19:45 UTC+1)

Porto (Portugal)	3–1	(Germany) Bayern Munich
Quaresma 3' (pen.), 10'; Martínez 65'	Report	Thiago 28'

Estádio do Dragão, Porto
Attendance: 50,092
Referee: Carlos Velasco Carballo (Spain)
21 April 2015
20:45

Bayern Munich (Germany)	6–1	(Portugal) Porto
Thiago 14'; Boateng 22'; Lewandowski 27', 40'; Müller 36'; Alonso 88'	Report	Martínez 73'

Allianz Arena, Munich
Attendance: 70,000
Referee: Martin Atkinson (England)

Bayern Munich won 7–4 on aggregate.

14 April 2015
20:45

Juventus (Italy)	1–0	(France) Monaco
Vidal 57' (pen.)	Report

Juventus Stadium, Turin
Attendance: 40,801
Referee: Pavel Královec (Czech Republic)
22 April 2015
20:45

Monaco (France)	0–0	(Italy) Juventus
	Report

Stade Louis II, Monaco
Attendance: 16,889
Referee: Willie Collum (Scotland)

Juventus won 1–0 on aggregate.

== Semi-finals ==
The draw was held on 24 April 2015. The first legs were played on 5 and 6 May, and the second legs were played on 12 and 13 May 2015.

=== Summary ===
Team 1	Agg.	Team 2	1st leg	2nd leg
Barcelona (Spain)	5–3	(Germany) Bayern Munich	3–0	2–3
Juventus (Italy)	3–2	(Spain) Real Madrid	2–1	1–1

=== Matches ===
6 May 2015
20:45

Barcelona (Spain)	3–0	(Germany) Bayern Munich
Messi 77', 80'; Neymar 90+4'	Report

Camp Nou, Barcelona
Attendance: 95,639
Referee: Nicola Rizzoli (Italy)
12 May 2015
20:45

Bayern Munich (Germany)	3–2	(Spain) Barcelona
Benatia 7'; Lewandowski 59'; Müller 74'	Report	Neymar 15', 29'

Allianz Arena, Munich
Attendance: 70,000
Referee: Mark Clattenburg (England)

Barcelona won 5–3 on aggregate.

5 May 2015
20:45

Juventus (Italy)	2–1	(Spain) Real Madrid
Morata 8'; Tevez 58' (pen.)	Report	Ronaldo 27'

Juventus Stadium, Turin
Attendance: 41,011
Referee: Martin Atkinson (England)
13 May 2015
20:45

Real Madrid (Spain)	1–1	(Italy) Juventus
Ronaldo 23' (pen.)	Report	Morata 57'

Santiago Bernabéu, Madrid
Attendance: 78,153
Referee: Jonas Eriksson (Sweden)

Juventus won 3–2 on aggregate.

== Final ==
The final was played on 6 June 2015 at the Olympiastadion in Berlin, Germany. The "home" team (for administrative purposes) was determined by an additional draw held after the semi-final draw.

6 June 2015
20:45

Juventus (Italy)	1–3	(Spain) Barcelona
Morata 55'	Report	Rakitić 4'; Suárez 68'; Neymar 90+7'

Olympiastadion, Berlin
Attendance: 70,442
Referee: Cüneyt Çakır (Turkey)
