= 2014–15 UEFA Champions League group stage =

European football competition

The 2014–15 UEFA Champions League group stage was played from 16 September to 10 December 2014. A total of 32 teams competed in the group stage to decide the 16 places in the knockout phase of the 2014–15 UEFA Champions League.

== Draw ==
The draw was held on 28 August 2014, 17:45 CEST, at the Grimaldi Forum in Monaco. The 32 teams were allocated into four pots based on their UEFA club coefficients at the beginning of the season, with the title holders being placed in Pot 1 automatically. They were drawn into eight groups of four containing one team from each of the four seeding pots, with the restriction that teams from the same national association could not be drawn against each other. Moreover, the draw was controlled for teams from the same association in order to split the teams evenly into the two sets of groups (A–D, E–H) for maximum television coverage.

The fixtures were decided after the draw. On each matchday, four groups played their matches on Tuesday, while the other four groups played their matches on Wednesday, with the two sets of groups (A–D, E–H) alternating between each matchday. There were other restrictions: for example, teams from the same city (e.g., Real Madrid and Atlético Madrid, Chelsea and Arsenal, Benfica and Sporting CP) in general did not play at home on the same matchday (UEFA tried to avoid teams from the same city playing at home on the same day or on consecutive days), and Russian teams did not play at home on the last matchday due to cold weather.

On 17 July 2014, the UEFA Emergency Panel ruled that Ukrainian and Russian clubs would not be drawn against each other "until further notice" due to the political unrest between the countries. Therefore, Ukrainian club Shakhtar Donetsk (Pot 2) and Russian club CSKA Moscow (Pot 3) could not be drawn into the same group despite being in different pots.

== Teams ==
Below were the 32 teams which qualified for the group stage (with their 2014 UEFA club coefficients), grouped by their seeding pot. They included 22 teams which entered in this stage, and the 10 winners of the play-off round (5 in Champions Route, 5 in League Route).

Key to colours
Group winners and runners-up advanced to the round of 16
Third-placed teams entered the Europa League round of 32

Pot 1
Team	Notes	Coeff.
(Spain) Real Madrid		161.542
(Spain) Barcelona		157.542
(Germany) Bayern Munich		154.328
(England) Chelsea		140.949
(Portugal) Benfica		129.459
(Spain) Atlético Madrid		119.542
(England) Arsenal		112.949
(Portugal) Porto		105.459

Pot 2
Team	Notes	Coeff.
(Germany) Schalke 04		95.328
(Germany) Borussia Dortmund		82.328
(Italy) Juventus		80.387
(France) Paris Saint-Germain		80.300
(Ukraine) Shakhtar Donetsk		78.193
(Switzerland) Basel		75.645
(Russia) Zenit Saint Petersburg		73.899
(England) Manchester City		72.949

Pot 3
Team	Notes	Coeff.
(Germany) Bayer Leverkusen		70.328
(Greece) Olympiacos		67.720
(Russia) CSKA Moscow		66.899
(Netherlands) Ajax		61.862
(England) Liverpool		58.949
(Portugal) Sporting CP		58.459
(Turkey) Galatasaray		55.340
(Spain) Athletic Bilbao		54.542

Pot 4
Team	Notes	Coeff.
(Belgium) Anderlecht		50.260
(Italy) Roma		39.887
(Cyprus) APOEL		37.650
(Belarus) BATE Borisov		33.725
(Bulgaria) Ludogorets Razgrad		18.125
(Slovenia) Maribor		16.200
(France) Monaco		11.300
(Sweden) Malmö FF		6.265

Notes

1. ^{TH} Champions League title holders (automatic top seed of pot 1)
2. ^{CR} Winners of the play-off round (Champions Route).
3. ^{LR} Winners of the play-off round (League Route).

== Format ==
In each group, teams played against each other home-and-away in a round-robin format. The group winners and runners-up advanced to the round of 16, while the third-placed teams entered the Europa League round of 32.

=== Tiebreakers ===
The teams were ranked according to points (3 points for a win, 1 point for a draw, 0 points for a loss). If two or more teams were equal on points on completion of the group matches, the following criteria were applied to determine the rankings:

1. higher number of points obtained in the group matches played among the teams in question;
2. superior goal difference from the group matches played among the teams in question;
3. higher number of goals scored in the group matches played among the teams in question;
4. higher number of goals scored away from home in the group matches played among the teams in question;
5. If, after applying criteria 1 to 4 to several teams, two or more teams still have an equal ranking, criteria 1 to 4 are reapplied exclusively to the matches between the teams in question to determine their final rankings. If this procedure does not lead to a decision, criteria 6 to 8 apply;
6. superior goal difference from all group matches played;
7. higher number of goals scored from all group matches played;
8. higher number of coefficient points accumulated by the club in question, as well as its association, over the previous five seasons.

== Groups ==
The matchdays were 16–17 September, 30 September – 1 October, 21–22 October, 4–5 November, 25–26 November, and 9–10 December 2014. The match kickoff times were 20:45 CEST/CET, except for matches in Russia and one match in Belarus which were 18:00 CEST/CET.

Times are CET/CEST, (Note: CET (UTC+1) for matches from 4 November 2014, and CEST (UTC+2) for matches to 22 October 2014) as listed by UEFA (local times, if different, are in parentheses).

=== Group A ===
Pos	Team	Pld	W	D	L	GF	GA	GD	Pts	Qualification	ATM	JUV	OLY	MAL
1	(Spain) Atlético Madrid	6	4	1	1	14	3	+11	13	Advance to knockout phase	—	1–0	4–0	5–0
2	(Italy) Juventus	6	3	1	2	7	4	+3	10	Advance to knockout phase	0–0	—	3–2	2–0
3	(Greece) Olympiacos	6	3	0	3	10	13	−3	9	Transfer to Europa League	3–2	1–0	—	4–2
4	(Sweden) Malmö FF	6	1	0	5	4	15	−11	3		0–2	0–2	2–0	—

Source: UEFA
Rules for classification: Group stage tiebreakers
16 September 2014
20:45 (21:45 UTC+3)

Olympiacos (Greece)	3–2	(Spain) Atlético Madrid
Masuaku 13'; Afellay 31'; Mitroglou 73'	Report	Mandžukić 38'; Griezmann 86'

Karaiskakis Stadium, Piraeus
Attendance: 31,946
Referee: Pedro Proença (Portugal)
16 September 2014
20:45

Juventus (Italy)	2–0	(Sweden) Malmö FF
Tevez 59', 90'	Report

Juventus Stadium, Turin
Attendance: 31,218
Referee: Szymon Marciniak (Poland)

1 October 2014
20:45

Malmö FF (Sweden)	2–0	(Greece) Olympiacos
Rosenberg 42', 82'	Report

Swedbank Stadion, Malmö
Attendance: 20,500
Referee: Sergei Karasev (Russia)
1 October 2014
20:45

Atlético Madrid (Spain)	1–0	(Italy) Juventus
Turan 75'	Report

Vicente Calderón, Madrid
Attendance: 44,322
Referee: Felix Brych (Germany)

22 October 2014
20:45

Atlético Madrid (Spain)	5–0	(Sweden) Malmö FF
Koke 48'; Mandžukić 61'; Griezmann 63'; Godín 87'; Cerci 90+3'	Report

Vicente Calderón, Madrid
Attendance: 34,502
Referee: Matej Jug (Slovenia)
22 October 2014
20:45 (21:45 UTC+3)

Olympiacos (Greece)	1–0	(Italy) Juventus
Kasami 36'	Report

Karaiskakis Stadium, Piraeus
Attendance: 31,411
Referee: Milorad Mažić (Serbia)

4 November 2014
20:45

Malmö FF (Sweden)	0–2	(Spain) Atlético Madrid
	Report	Koke 30'; García 78'

Swedbank Stadion, Malmö
Attendance: 20,500
Referee: Mark Clattenburg (England)
4 November 2014
20:45

Juventus (Italy)	3–2	(Greece) Olympiacos
Pirlo 21'; Roberto 65' (o.g.); Pogba 66'	Report	Botía 24'; N'Dinga 61'

Juventus Stadium, Turin
Attendance: 39,091
Referee: Martin Atkinson (England)

26 November 2014
20:45

Atlético Madrid (Spain)	4–0	(Greece) Olympiacos
García 9'; Mandžukić 38', 62', 65'	Report

Vicente Calderón, Madrid
Attendance: 40,121
Referee: Wolfgang Stark (Germany)
26 November 2014
20:45

Malmö FF (Sweden)	0–2	(Italy) Juventus
	Report	Llorente 49'; Tevez 88'

Swedbank Stadion, Malmö
Attendance: 20,500
Referee: Pedro Proença (Portugal)

9 December 2014
20:45 (21:45 UTC+2)

Olympiacos (Greece)	4–2	(Sweden) Malmö FF
Fuster 22'; Domínguez 63'; Mitroglou 87'; Afellay 90'	Report	Kroon 59'; Rosenberg 81'

Karaiskakis Stadium, Piraeus
Attendance: 27,562
Referee: Stéphane Lannoy (France)
9 December 2014
20:45

Juventus (Italy)	0–0	(Spain) Atlético Madrid
	Report

Juventus Stadium, Turin
Attendance: 39,219
Referee: Willie Collum (Scotland)

=== Group B ===
Pos	Team	Pld	W	D	L	GF	GA	GD	Pts	Qualification	RMA	BSL	LIV	LUD
1	(Spain) Real Madrid	6	6	0	0	16	2	+14	18	Advance to knockout phase	—	5–1	1–0	4–0
2	(Switzerland) Basel	6	2	1	3	7	8	−1	7	Advance to knockout phase	0–1	—	1–0	4–0
3	(England) Liverpool	6	1	2	3	5	9	−4	5	Transfer to Europa League	0–3	1–1	—	2–1
4	(Bulgaria) Ludogorets Razgrad	6	1	1	4	5	14	−9	4		1–2	1–0	2–2	—

Source: UEFA
Rules for classification: Group stage tiebreakers
16 September 2014
20:45 (19:45 UTC+1)

Liverpool (England)	2–1	(Bulgaria) Ludogorets Razgrad
Balotelli 82'; Gerrard 90+3' (pen.)	Report	Abalo 90+1'

Anfield, Liverpool
Attendance: 43,307
Referee: Matej Jug (Slovenia)
16 September 2014
20:45

Real Madrid (Spain)	5–1	(Switzerland) Basel
Suchý 14' (o.g.); Bale 30'; Ronaldo 31'; Rodríguez 37'; Benzema 79'	Report	González 38'

Santiago Bernabéu, Madrid
Attendance: 65,364
Referee: Damir Skomina (Slovenia)

1 October 2014
20:45

Basel (Switzerland)	1–0	(England) Liverpool
Streller 52'	Report

St. Jakob-Park, Basel
Attendance: 36,000
Referee: Jonas Eriksson (Sweden)
1 October 2014
20:45 (21:45 UTC+3)

Ludogorets Razgrad (Bulgaria)	1–2	(Spain) Real Madrid
Marcelinho 6'	Report	Ronaldo 24' (pen.); Benzema 77'

Vasil Levski National Stadium, Sofia (Note: Ludogorets Razgrad played their home matches at Vasil Levski National Stadium, Sofia instead of their regular stadium, Ludogorets Arena, Razgrad.)
Attendance: 41,484
Referee: Craig Thomson (Scotland)

22 October 2014
20:45 (21:45 UTC+3)

Ludogorets Razgrad (Bulgaria)	1–0	(Switzerland) Basel
Minev 90+2'	Report

Vasil Levski National Stadium, Sofia
Attendance: 29,150
Referee: Deniz Aytekin (Germany)
22 October 2014
20:45 (19:45 UTC+1)

Liverpool (England)	0–3	(Spain) Real Madrid
	Report	Ronaldo 23'; Benzema 30', 41'

Anfield, Liverpool
Attendance: 43,521
Referee: Nicola Rizzoli (Italy)

4 November 2014
20:45

Basel (Switzerland)	4–0	(Bulgaria) Ludogorets Razgrad
Embolo 34'; González 41'; Gashi 59'; Suchý 65'	Report

St. Jakob-Park, Basel
Attendance: 35,272
Referee: Stéphane Lannoy (France)
4 November 2014
20:45

Real Madrid (Spain)	1–0	(England) Liverpool
Benzema 27'	Report

Santiago Bernabéu, Madrid
Attendance: 79,283
Referee: Viktor Kassai (Hungary)

26 November 2014
20:45 (21:45 UTC+2)

Ludogorets Razgrad (Bulgaria)	2–2	(England) Liverpool
Abalo 3'; Terziev 88'	Report	Lambert 8'; Henderson 37'

Vasil Levski National Stadium, Sofia
Attendance: 37,143
Referee: Antonio Mateu Lahoz (Spain)
26 November 2014
20:45

Basel (Switzerland)	0–1	(Spain) Real Madrid
	Report	Ronaldo 35'

St. Jakob-Park, Basel
Attendance: 36,000
Referee: Milorad Mažić (Serbia)

9 December 2014
20:45 (19:45 UTC+0)

Liverpool (England)	1–1	(Switzerland) Basel
Gerrard 81'	Report	Frei 25'

Anfield, Liverpool
Attendance: 43,290
Referee: Björn Kuipers (Netherlands)
9 December 2014
20:45

Real Madrid (Spain)	4–0	(Bulgaria) Ludogorets Razgrad
Ronaldo 20' (pen.); Bale 38'; Arbeloa 80'; Medrán 88'	Report

Santiago Bernabéu, Madrid
Attendance: 58,393
Referee: Clément Turpin (France)

=== Group C ===
Pos	Team	Pld	W	D	L	GF	GA	GD	Pts	Qualification	MON	LEV	ZEN	BEN
1	(France) Monaco	6	3	2	1	4	1	+3	11	Advance to knockout phase	—	1–0	2–0	0–0
2	(Germany) Bayer Leverkusen	6	3	1	2	7	4	+3	10	Advance to knockout phase	0–1	—	2–0	3–1
3	(Russia) Zenit Saint Petersburg	6	2	1	3	4	6	−2	7	Transfer to Europa League	0–0	1–2	—	1–0
4	(Portugal) Benfica	6	1	2	3	2	6	−4	5		1–0	0–0	0–2	—

Source: UEFA
Rules for classification: Group stage tiebreakers
16 September 2014
20:45

Monaco (France)	1–0	(Germany) Bayer Leverkusen
Moutinho 61'	Report

Stade Louis II, Monaco
Attendance: 8,130
Referee: Pavel Královec (Czech Republic)
16 September 2014
20:45 (19:45 UTC+1)

Benfica (Portugal)	0–2	(Russia) Zenit Saint Petersburg
	Report	Hulk 5'; Witsel 22'

Estádio da Luz, Lisbon
Attendance: 35,294
Referee: Svein Oddvar Moen (Norway)

1 October 2014
18:00 (20:00 UTC+4)

Zenit Saint Petersburg (Russia)	0–0	(France) Monaco
	Report

Petrovsky Stadium, Saint Petersburg
Attendance: 13,817
Referee: Mark Clattenburg (England)
1 October 2014
20:45

Bayer Leverkusen (Germany)	3–1	(Portugal) Benfica
Kießling 25'; Son Heung-min 34'; Çalhanoğlu 64' (pen.)	Report	Salvio 62'

BayArena, Leverkusen
Attendance: 25,202
Referee: Martin Atkinson (England)

22 October 2014
20:45

Bayer Leverkusen (Germany)	2–0	(Russia) Zenit Saint Petersburg
Donati 58'; Papadopoulos 63'	Report

BayArena, Leverkusen
Attendance: 27,254
Referee: Björn Kuipers (Netherlands)
22 October 2014
20:45

Monaco (France)	0–0	(Portugal) Benfica
	Report

Stade Louis II, Monaco
Attendance: 12,776
Referee: Szymon Marciniak (Poland)

4 November 2014
18:00 (20:00 UTC+3)

Zenit Saint Petersburg (Russia)	1–2	(Germany) Bayer Leverkusen
Rondón 89'	Report	Son Heung-min 68', 73'

Petrovsky Stadium, Saint Petersburg
Attendance: 17,010
Referee: Alberto Undiano Mallenco (Spain)
4 November 2014
20:45 (19:45 UTC+0)

Benfica (Portugal)	1–0	(France) Monaco
Talisca 82'	Report

Estádio da Luz, Lisbon
Attendance: 32,565
Referee: David Fernández Borbalán (Spain)

26 November 2014
18:00 (20:00 UTC+3)

Zenit Saint Petersburg (Russia)	1–0	(Portugal) Benfica
Danny 79'	Report

Petrovsky Stadium, Saint Petersburg
Attendance: 14,123
Referee: Nicola Rizzoli (Italy)
26 November 2014
20:45

Bayer Leverkusen (Germany)	0–1	(France) Monaco
	Report	Ocampos 72'

BayArena, Leverkusen
Attendance: 26,230
Referee: Paolo Tagliavento (Italy)

9 December 2014
20:45

Monaco (France)	2–0	(Russia) Zenit Saint Petersburg
Abdennour 63'; Fabinho 89'	Report

Stade Louis II, Monaco
Attendance: 11,319
Referee: Damir Skomina (Slovenia)
9 December 2014
20:45 (19:45 UTC+0)

Benfica (Portugal)	0–0	(Germany) Bayer Leverkusen
	Report

Estádio da Luz, Lisbon
Attendance: 17,564
Referee: Aleksei Kulbakov (Belarus)

=== Group D ===
Pos	Team	Pld	W	D	L	GF	GA	GD	Pts	Qualification	DOR	ARS	AND	GAL
1	(Germany) Borussia Dortmund	6	4	1	1	14	4	+10	13	Advance to knockout phase	—	2–0	1–1	4–1
2	(England) Arsenal	6	4	1	1	15	8	+7	13	Advance to knockout phase	2–0	—	3–3	4–1
3	(Belgium) Anderlecht	6	1	3	2	8	10	−2	6	Transfer to Europa League	0–3	1–2	—	2–0
4	(Turkey) Galatasaray	6	0	1	5	4	19	−15	1		0–4	1–4	1–1	—

Source: UEFA
Rules for classification: Group stage tiebreakers
16 September 2014
20:45 (21:45 UTC+3)

Galatasaray (Turkey)	1–1	(Belgium) Anderlecht
Yılmaz 90+1'	Report	Praet 52'

Türk Telekom Arena, Istanbul
Attendance: 28,553
Referee: István Vad (Hungary)
16 September 2014
20:45

Borussia Dortmund (Germany)	2–0	(England) Arsenal
Immobile 45'; Aubameyang 48'	Report

Westfalenstadion, Dortmund
Attendance: 65,851
Referee: Olegário Benquerença (Portugal)

1 October 2014
20:45 (19:45 UTC+1)

Arsenal (England)	4–1	(Turkey) Galatasaray
Welbeck 22', 30', 52'; Sánchez 41'	Report	Yılmaz 63' (pen.)

Emirates Stadium, London
Attendance: 59,803
Referee: Gianluca Rocchi (Italy)
1 October 2014
20:45

Anderlecht (Belgium)	0–3	(Germany) Borussia Dortmund
	Report	Immobile 3'; Ramos 69', 79'

Constant Vanden Stock Stadium, Brussels
Attendance: 18,649
Referee: Paolo Tagliavento (Italy)

22 October 2014
20:45

Anderlecht (Belgium)	1–2	(England) Arsenal
Najar 71'	Report	Gibbs 89'; Podolski 90+1'

Constant Vanden Stock Stadium, Brussels
Attendance: 19,881
Referee: Carlos Velasco Carballo (Spain)
22 October 2014
20:45 (21:45 UTC+3)

Galatasaray (Turkey)	0–4	(Germany) Borussia Dortmund
	Report	Aubameyang 6', 18'; Reus 41'; Ramos 83'

Türk Telekom Arena, Istanbul
Attendance: 36,324
Referee: Antonio Mateu Lahoz (Spain)

4 November 2014
20:45 (19:45 UTC+0)

Arsenal (England)	3–3	(Belgium) Anderlecht
Arteta 25' (pen.); Sánchez 29'; Oxlade-Chamberlain 58'	Report	Vanden Borre 61', 73' (pen.); Mitrović 90'

Emirates Stadium, London
Attendance: 59,872
Referee: Clément Turpin (France)
4 November 2014
20:45

Borussia Dortmund (Germany)	4–1	(Turkey) Galatasaray
Reus 39'; Papastathopoulos 56'; Immobile 74'; Kaya 85' (o.g.)	Report	Balta 70'

Westfalenstadion, Dortmund
Attendance: 65,851
Referee: Pavel Královec (Czech Republic)

26 November 2014
20:45

Anderlecht (Belgium)	2–0	(Turkey) Galatasaray
Mbemba 44', 86'	Report

Constant Vanden Stock Stadium, Brussels
Attendance: 19,857
Referee: Ivan Bebek (Croatia)
26 November 2014
20:45 (19:45 UTC+0)

Arsenal (England)	2–0	(Germany) Borussia Dortmund
Sanogo 2'; Sánchez 57'	Report

Emirates Stadium, London
Attendance: 59,902
Referee: Viktor Kassai (Hungary)

9 December 2014
20:45 (21:45 UTC+2)

Galatasaray (Turkey)	1–4	(England) Arsenal
Sneijder 88'	Report	Podolski 3', 90+2'; Ramsey 11', 29'

Türk Telekom Arena, Istanbul
Attendance: 20,590
Referee: David Fernández Borbalán (Spain)
9 December 2014
20:45

Borussia Dortmund (Germany)	1–1	(Belgium) Anderlecht
Immobile 58'	Report	Mitrović 84'

Westfalenstadion, Dortmund
Attendance: 65,851
Referee: Alberto Undiano Mallenco (Spain)

=== Group E ===
Pos	Team	Pld	W	D	L	GF	GA	GD	Pts	Qualification	BAY	MCI	ROM	CSKA
1	(Germany) Bayern Munich	6	5	0	1	16	4	+12	15	Advance to knockout phase	—	1–0	2–0	3–0
2	(England) Manchester City	6	2	2	2	9	8	+1	8	Advance to knockout phase	3–2	—	1–1	1–2
3	(Italy) Roma	6	1	2	3	8	14	−6	5	Transfer to Europa League	1–7	0–2	—	5–1
4	(Russia) CSKA Moscow	6	1	2	3	6	13	−7	5		0–1	2–2	1–1	—

Source: UEFA
Rules for classification: Group stage tiebreakers
17 September 2014
20:45

Roma (Italy)	5–1	(Russia) CSKA Moscow
Iturbe 6'; Gervinho 10', 31'; Maicon 20'; Ignashevich 50' (o.g.)	Report	Musa 82'

Stadio Olimpico, Rome
Attendance: 40,888
Referee: David Fernández Borbalán (Spain)
17 September 2014
20:45

Bayern Munich (Germany)	1–0	(England) Manchester City
Boateng 90'	Report

Allianz Arena, Munich
Attendance: 68,000
Referee: Alberto Undiano Mallenco (Spain)

30 September 2014
18:00 (21:00 UTC+4)

CSKA Moscow (Russia)	0–1	(Germany) Bayern Munich
	Report	Müller 22' (pen.)

Arena Khimki, Khimki
Attendance: 0 (Note: The CSKA Moscow v Bayern Munich match was played behind closed doors due to punishment by UEFA.)
Referee: Willie Collum (Scotland)
30 September 2014
20:45 (19:45 UTC+1)

Manchester City (England)	1–1	(Italy) Roma
Agüero 4' (pen.)	Report	Totti 23'

City of Manchester Stadium, Manchester
Attendance: 37,509
Referee: Björn Kuipers (Netherlands)

21 October 2014
18:00 (21:00 UTC+4)

CSKA Moscow (Russia)	2–2	(England) Manchester City
Doumbia 65'; Natcho 86' (pen.)	Report	Agüero 29'; Milner 38'

Arena Khimki, Khimki
Attendance: 0 (Note: The CSKA Moscow v Manchester City and v Roma matches were played behind closed doors due to punishment by UEFA, after incidents at the Roma v CSKA Moscow match on 17 September 2014.)
Referee: István Vad (Hungary)
21 October 2014
20:45

Roma (Italy)	1–7	(Germany) Bayern Munich
Gervinho 66'	Report	Robben 9', 30'; Götze 23'; Lewandowski 25'; Müller 36' (pen.); Ribéry 78'; Shaqiri 80'

Stadio Olimpico, Rome
Attendance: 70,544
Referee: Jonas Eriksson (Sweden)

5 November 2014
20:45 (19:45 UTC+0)

Manchester City (England)	1–2	(Russia) CSKA Moscow
Touré 8'	Report	Doumbia 2', 34'

City of Manchester Stadium, Manchester
Attendance: 45,143
Referee: Anastasios Sidiropoulos (Greece)
5 November 2014
20:45

Bayern Munich (Germany)	2–0	(Italy) Roma
Ribéry 38'; Götze 64'	Report

Allianz Arena, Munich
Attendance: 68,000
Referee: Cüneyt Çakır (Turkey)

25 November 2014
18:00 (20:00 UTC+3)

CSKA Moscow (Russia)	1–1	(Italy) Roma
V. Berezutski 90+3'	Report	Totti 43'

Arena Khimki, Khimki
Attendance: 0
Referee: Felix Brych (Germany)
25 November 2014
20:45 (19:45 UTC+0)

Manchester City (England)	3–2	(Germany) Bayern Munich
Agüero 22' (pen.), 85', 90+1'	Report	Alonso 40'; Lewandowski 45'

City of Manchester Stadium, Manchester
Attendance: 44,510
Referee: Pavel Královec (Czech Republic)

10 December 2014
20:45

Roma (Italy)	0–2	(England) Manchester City
	Report	Nasri 60'; Zabaleta 86'

Stadio Olimpico, Rome
Attendance: 54,119
Referee: Milorad Mažić (Serbia)
10 December 2014
20:45

Bayern Munich (Germany)	3–0	(Russia) CSKA Moscow
Müller 18' (pen.); Rode 84'; Götze 90'	Report

Allianz Arena, Munich
Attendance: 68,000
Referee: Olegário Benquerença (Portugal)

=== Group F ===
Pos	Team	Pld	W	D	L	GF	GA	GD	Pts	Qualification	BAR	PAR	AJX	APO
1	(Spain) Barcelona	6	5	0	1	15	5	+10	15	Advance to knockout phase	—	3–1	3–1	1–0
2	(France) Paris Saint-Germain	6	4	1	1	10	7	+3	13	Advance to knockout phase	3–2	—	3–1	1–0
3	(Netherlands) Ajax	6	1	2	3	8	10	−2	5	Transfer to Europa League	0–2	1–1	—	4–0
4	(Cyprus) APOEL	6	0	1	5	1	12	−11	1		0–4	0–1	1–1	—

Source: UEFA
Rules for classification: Group stage tiebreakers
17 September 2014
20:45

Barcelona (Spain)	1–0	(Cyprus) APOEL
Piqué 28'	Report

Camp Nou, Barcelona
Attendance: 62,832
Referee: Deniz Aytekin (Germany)
17 September 2014
20:45

Ajax (Netherlands)	1–1	(France) Paris Saint-Germain
Schöne 74'	Report	Cavani 14'

Amsterdam Arena, Amsterdam
Attendance: 50,430
Referee: Wolfgang Stark (Germany)

30 September 2014
20:45

Paris Saint-Germain (France)	3–2	(Spain) Barcelona
David Luiz 10'; Verratti 26'; Matuidi 54'	Report	Messi 12'; Neymar 56'

Parc des Princes, Paris
Attendance: 46,400
Referee: Nicola Rizzoli (Italy)
30 September 2014
20:45 (21:45 UTC+3)

APOEL (Cyprus)	1–1	(Netherlands) Ajax
Manduca 31' (pen.)	Report	Andersen 28'

GSP Stadium, Nicosia
Attendance: 17,190
Referee: Milorad Mažić (Serbia)

21 October 2014
20:45 (21:45 UTC+3)

APOEL (Cyprus)	0–1	(France) Paris Saint-Germain
	Report	Cavani 87'

GSP Stadium, Nicosia
Attendance: 18,659
Referee: Ovidiu Hațegan (Romania)
21 October 2014
20:45

Barcelona (Spain)	3–1	(Netherlands) Ajax
Neymar 7'; Messi 24'; Sandro 90+4'	Report	El Ghazi 88'

Camp Nou, Barcelona
Attendance: 79,357
Referee: Willie Collum (Scotland)

5 November 2014
20:45

Paris Saint-Germain (France)	1–0	(Cyprus) APOEL
Cavani 1'	Report

Parc des Princes, Paris
Attendance: 45,816
Referee: Olegário Benquerença (Portugal)
5 November 2014
20:45

Ajax (Netherlands)	0–2	(Spain) Barcelona
	Report	Messi 36', 76'

Amsterdam Arena, Amsterdam
Attendance: 52,117
Referee: Pedro Proença (Portugal)

25 November 2014
20:45 (21:45 UTC+2)

APOEL (Cyprus)	0–4	(Spain) Barcelona
	Report	Suárez 27'; Messi 38', 58', 87'

GSP Stadium, Nicosia
Attendance: 20,626
Referee: Gianluca Rocchi (Italy)
25 November 2014
20:45

Paris Saint-Germain (France)	3–1	(Netherlands) Ajax
Cavani 33', 83'; Ibrahimović 78'	Report	Klaassen 67'

Parc des Princes, Paris
Attendance: 46,130
Referee: Matej Jug (Slovenia)

10 December 2014
20:45

Barcelona (Spain)	3–1	(France) Paris Saint-Germain
Messi 19'; Neymar 42'; Suárez 77'	Report	Ibrahimović 15'

Camp Nou, Barcelona
Attendance: 82,570
Referee: Martin Atkinson (England)
10 December 2014
20:45

Ajax (Netherlands)	4–0	(Cyprus) APOEL
Schöne 45+1' (pen.), 50'; Klaassen 53'; Milik 74'	Report

Amsterdam Arena, Amsterdam
Attendance: 51,796
Referee: Carlos Velasco Carballo (Spain)

=== Group G ===
Pos	Team	Pld	W	D	L	GF	GA	GD	Pts	Qualification	CHE	SCH	SPO	MRB
1	(England) Chelsea	6	4	2	0	17	3	+14	14	Advance to knockout phase	—	1–1	3–1	6–0
2	(Germany) Schalke 04	6	2	2	2	9	14	−5	8	Advance to knockout phase	0–5	—	4–3	1–1
3	(Portugal) Sporting CP	6	2	1	3	12	12	0	7	Transfer to Europa League	0–1	4–2	—	3–1
4	(Slovenia) Maribor	6	0	3	3	4	13	−9	3		1–1	0–1	1–1	—

Source: UEFA
Rules for classification: Group stage tiebreakers
17 September 2014
20:45 (19:45 UTC+1)

Chelsea (England)	1–1	(Germany) Schalke 04
Fàbregas 11'	Report	Huntelaar 62'

Stamford Bridge, London
Attendance: 40,648
Referee: Ivan Bebek (Croatia)
17 September 2014
20:45

Maribor (Slovenia)	1–1	(Portugal) Sporting CP
Zahović 90+2'	Report	Nani 80'

Ljudski vrt, Maribor
Attendance: 12,211
Referee: Clément Turpin (France)

30 September 2014
20:45 (19:45 UTC+1)

Sporting CP (Portugal)	0–1	(England) Chelsea
	Report	Matić 34'

Estádio José Alvalade, Lisbon
Attendance: 40,734
Referee: Antonio Mateu Lahoz (Spain)
30 September 2014
20:45

Schalke 04 (Germany)	1–1	(Slovenia) Maribor
Huntelaar 56'	Report	Bohar 37'

Arena AufSchalke, Gelsenkirchen
Attendance: 47,997
Referee: Carlos Velasco Carballo (Spain)

21 October 2014
20:45

Schalke 04 (Germany)	4–3	(Portugal) Sporting CP
Obasi 34'; Huntelaar 51'; Höwedes 60'; Choupo-Moting 90+3' (pen.)	Report	Nani 16'; Adrien 64' (pen.), 78'

Arena AufSchalke, Gelsenkirchen
Attendance: 49,943
Referee: Sergei Karasev (Russia)
21 October 2014
20:45 (19:45 UTC+1)

Chelsea (England)	6–0	(Slovenia) Maribor
Rémy 13'; Drogba 23' (pen.); Terry 31'; Viler 54' (o.g.); Hazard 77' (pen.), 90'	Report

Stamford Bridge, London
Attendance: 41,126
Referee: Danny Makkelie (Netherlands)

5 November 2014
20:45 (19:45 UTC+0)

Sporting CP (Portugal)	4–2	(Germany) Schalke 04
Sarr 26'; Jefferson 52'; Nani 72'; Slimani 90+1'	Report	Slimani 17' (o.g.); Aogo 88'

Estádio José Alvalade, Lisbon
Attendance: 35,473
Referee: Paolo Tagliavento (Italy)
5 November 2014
20:45

Maribor (Slovenia)	1–1	(England) Chelsea
Ibraimi 50'	Report	Matić 73'

Ljudski vrt, Maribor
Attendance: 12,646
Referee: Daniele Orsato (Italy)

25 November 2014
20:45

Schalke 04 (Germany)	0–5	(England) Chelsea
	Report	Terry 2'; Willian 29'; Kirchhoff 44' (o.g.); Drogba 76'; Ramires 78'

Arena AufSchalke, Gelsenkirchen
Attendance: 54,442
Referee: Jonas Eriksson (Sweden)
25 November 2014
20:45 (19:45 UTC+0)

Sporting CP (Portugal)	3–1	(Slovenia) Maribor
Mané 10'; Nani 35'; Slimani 65'	Report	Jefferson 42' (o.g.)

Estádio José Alvalade, Lisbon
Attendance: 32,739
Referee: Craig Thomson (Scotland)

10 December 2014
20:45 (19:45 UTC+0)

Chelsea (England)	3–1	(Portugal) Sporting CP
Fàbregas 8' (pen.); Schürrle 16'; Mikel 56'	Report	Silva 50'

Stamford Bridge, London
Attendance: 41,089
Referee: Svein Oddvar Moen (Norway)
10 December 2014
20:45

Maribor (Slovenia)	0–1	(Germany) Schalke 04
	Report	Meyer 62'

Ljudski vrt, Maribor
Attendance: 12,516
Referee: Szymon Marciniak (Poland)

=== Group H ===
Pos	Team	Pld	W	D	L	GF	GA	GD	Pts	Qualification	POR	SHK	ATH	BATE
1	(Portugal) Porto	6	4	2	0	16	4	+12	14	Advance to knockout phase	—	1–1	2–1	6–0
2	(Ukraine) Shakhtar Donetsk	6	2	3	1	15	4	+11	9	Advance to knockout phase	2–2	—	0–1	5–0
3	(Spain) Athletic Bilbao	6	2	1	3	5	6	−1	7	Transfer to Europa League	0–2	0–0	—	2–0
4	(Belarus) BATE Borisov	6	1	0	5	2	24	−22	3		0–3	0–7	2–1	—

Source: UEFA
Rules for classification: Group stage tiebreakers
17 September 2014
20:45 (19:45 UTC+1)

Porto (Portugal)	6–0	(Belarus) BATE Borisov
Brahimi 5', 32', 57'; Martínez 37'; Adrián 61'; Aboubakar 76'	Report

Estádio do Dragão, Porto
Attendance: 35,108
Referee: Bas Nijhuis (Netherlands)
17 September 2014
20:45

Athletic Bilbao (Spain)	0–0	(Ukraine) Shakhtar Donetsk
	Report

San Mamés, Bilbao
Attendance: 48,351
Referee: Anastasios Sidiropoulos (Greece)

30 September 2014
20:45 (21:45 UTC+3)

Shakhtar Donetsk (Ukraine)	2–2	(Portugal) Porto
Alex Teixeira 52'; Luiz Adriano 85'	Report	Martínez 89' (pen.), 90+4'

Arena Lviv, Lviv (Note: Shakhtar Donetsk played their home matches at Arena Lviv, Lviv instead of their regular stadium, Donbas Arena, Donetsk, due to the war conditions in Eastern Ukraine.)
Attendance: 33,217
Referee: Cüneyt Çakır (Turkey)
30 September 2014
20:45 (21:45 UTC+3)

BATE Borisov (Belarus)	2–1	(Spain) Athletic Bilbao
Palyakow 19'; Karnitsky 41'	Report	Aduriz 45'

Borisov Arena, Barysaw
Attendance: 11,886
Referee: Stéphane Lannoy (France)

21 October 2014
20:45 (21:45 UTC+3)

BATE Borisov (Belarus)	0–7	(Ukraine) Shakhtar Donetsk
	Report	Alex Teixeira 11'; Luiz Adriano 28' (pen.), 36', 40', 44', 82' (pen.); Douglas Costa 35'

Borisov Arena, Barysaw
Attendance: 12,113
Referee: Ivan Bebek (Croatia)
21 October 2014
20:45 (19:45 UTC+1)

Porto (Portugal)	2–1	(Spain) Athletic Bilbao
Herrera 45'; Quaresma 75'	Report	Guillermo 58'

Estádio do Dragão, Porto
Attendance: 38,116
Referee: Damir Skomina (Slovenia)

5 November 2014
20:45 (21:45 UTC+2)

Shakhtar Donetsk (Ukraine)	5–0	(Belarus) BATE Borisov
Srna 19'; Alex Teixeira 48'; Luiz Adriano 58' (pen.), 83', 90+3'	Report

Arena Lviv, Lviv
Attendance: 29,173
Referee: Wolfgang Stark (Germany)
5 November 2014
20:45

Athletic Bilbao (Spain)	0–2	(Portugal) Porto
	Report	Martínez 56'; Brahimi 73'

San Mamés, Bilbao
Attendance: 47,243
Referee: Felix Brych (Germany)

25 November 2014
18:00 (20:00 UTC+3)

BATE Borisov (Belarus)	0–3	(Portugal) Porto
	Report	Herrera 56'; Martínez 65'; Tello 89'

Borisov Arena, Barysaw
Attendance: 10,147
Referee: Ovidiu Hațegan (Romania)
25 November 2014
20:45 (21:45 UTC+2)

Shakhtar Donetsk (Ukraine)	0–1	(Spain) Athletic Bilbao
	Report	San José 68'

Arena Lviv, Lviv
Attendance: 33,489
Referee: Mark Clattenburg (England)

10 December 2014
20:45 (19:45 UTC+0)

Porto (Portugal)	1–1	(Ukraine) Shakhtar Donetsk
Aboubakar 87'	Report	Stepanenko 50'

Estádio do Dragão, Porto
Attendance: 28,010
Referee: Ruddy Buquet (France)
10 December 2014
20:45

Athletic Bilbao (Spain)	2–0	(Belarus) BATE Borisov
San José 47'; Susaeta 88'	Report

San Mamés, Bilbao
Attendance: 42,852
Referee: Daniele Orsato (Italy)
