= Italian football clubs in international competitions =

Points by season (UEFA coefficient)
Season	Points
2021–22	15.714
2022–23	22.357
2023–24	21.000
2024–25	21.875
2025–26	19.000

Italian football clubs have entered European association football competitions (UEFA Champions League/European Cup, UEFA Europa League/UEFA Cup, Inter-Cities Fairs Cup, UEFA Conference League and the now defunct UEFA Intertoto Cup and UEFA Cup Winners' Cup) since the 1955–56 season, when Milan took part in European Cup competition. Nowadays, Italian football is the second force in Europe according to UEFA ranking, following the English league. Italian clubs have also entered worldwide inter-club competitions several times since the 1963 Intercontinental Cup.

The golden age of Italian football since the establishing of UEFA is regarded to have occurred in the 1980s and in the 1990s, when several Italian clubs won UEFA competitions, contributing to Serie A obtaining the highest confederation coefficient score for about fifteen years. Since the beginning of 21st century, the force of Italian football at international stage has decreased, mainly after the Calciopoli scandal.

So far, Italian clubs have won the Champions League/European Cup twelve times (Milan, Internazionale and Juventus), the UEFA Cup Winners' Cup seven times (Milan, Fiorentina, Juventus, Lazio, Parma and Sampdoria), the Europa League/UEFA Cup ten times (Internazionale, Juventus, Parma, Napoli and Atalanta), the Conference League once (Roma), the UEFA Super Cup nine times (Milan, Juventus, Lazio and Parma), the Intercontinental Cup seven times (Internazionale, Milan and Juventus), the FIFA Club World Cup twice (Internazionale and Milan), the Inter-Cities Fairs Cup once (Roma), and the UEFA Intertoto Cup four times (Bologna, Juventus, Perugia and Udinese).

== European and worldwide competitions winners from Italy ==
Team	Number of Wins	Years
Milan	21	1951, 1956, 1963, 1968, 1969 (2), 1973, 1982, 1989 (3), 1990 (3), 1994 (2), 2003 (2), 2007 (3)
Juventus	11	1977, 1984 (2), 1985 (2), 1990, 1993, 1996 (3), 1999
Internazionale	9	1964 (2), 1965 (2), 1991, 1994, 1998, 2010 (2)
Parma	4	1993 (2), 1995, 1999
Bologna	4	1932, 1934, 1961, 1998
Lazio	2	1999 (2)
Fiorentina	2	1961, 1966
Pisa	2	1986, 1988
Udinese	2	1980, 2000
Roma	2	1961, 2022
Napoli	1	1989
Sampdoria	1	1990
Perugia	1	2003
Torino	1	1991
Ascoli	1	1987
Bari	1	1990
Atalanta	1	2024

== UEFA competitions winners from Italy ==
Club	Number of Wins
Milan	17
Juventus	11
Internazionale	8
Parma	4
Lazio	2
Atalanta	1
Bologna	1
Fiorentina	1
Napoli	1
Perugia	1
Roma	1
Sampdoria	1
Udinese	1

== Cups and finals ==
=== European competitions ===
==== UEFA Champions League/European Cup ====
Club	Winners	Runners-up	Years won	Years runners-up
Milan	7	4	1963, 1969, 1989, 1990, 1994, 2003, 2007	1958, 1993, 1995, 2005
Internazionale	3	4	1964, 1965, 2010	1967, 1972, 2023, 2025
Juventus	2	7	1985, 1996	1973, 1983, 1997, 1998, 2003, 2015, 2017
Fiorentina	0	1	—	1957
Roma	0	1	—	1984
Sampdoria	0	1	—	1992

==== UEFA Cup Winner’s Cup/European Cup Winner’s Cup ====
Club	Winners	Runners-up	Years won	Years runners-up
Milan	2	1	1968, 1973	1974
Fiorentina	1	1	1961	1962
Sampdoria	1	1	1990	1989
Parma	1	1	1993	1994
Juventus	1	0	1984	—
Lazio	1	0	1999	—

==== UEFA Europa League/UEFA Cup ====
Club	Winners	Runners-up	Years won	Years runners-up
Internazionale	3	2	1991, 1994, 1998	1997, 2020
Juventus	3	1	1977, 1990, 1993	1995
Parma	2	0	1995, 1999	—
Napoli	1	0	1989	—
Atalanta	1	0	2024	—
Roma	0	2	—	1991, 2023
Fiorentina	0	1	—	1990
Torino	0	1	—	1992
Lazio	0	1	—	1998

==== UEFA Conference League ====
Club	Winners	Runners-up	Years won	Years runners-up
Roma	1	0	2022	—
Fiorentina	0	2	—	2023, 2024

==== Inter-Cities Fairs Cup ====
Club	Winners	Runners-up	Years won	Years runners-up
Roma	1	0	1961	—
Juventus	0	2	—	1965, 1971

==== UEFA Super Cup ====
Club	Winners	Runners-up	Years won	Years runners-up
Milan	5	2	1989, 1990, 1994, 2003, 2007	1973, 1993
Juventus	2	0	1984, 1996	—
Parma	1	0	1993	—
Lazio	1	0	1999	—
Sampdoria	0	1	—	1990
Internazionale	0	1	—	2010
Atalanta	0	1	—	2024

==== UEFA Intertoto Cup ====
Club	Winners	Runners-up	Years won	Years runners-up
Bologna	1	1	1998	2002
Juventus	1	0	1999	—
Udinese	1	0	2000	—
Perugia	1	0	2003	—
Sampdoria	1	0	2007 (Note: While Sampdoria, along with 10 other clubs, won their matches and qualified for the UEFA Cup, Hamburger SV were declared the overall winner of the competition for having advanced further in the tournament above.)	—
Napoli	1	0	2008 (Note: While Napoli, along with 10 other clubs, won their matches and qualified for the UEFA Cup, Braga were declared the overall winner of the competition for having advanced further in the tournament above.)	—
Brescia	0	1		2001

==== Intertoto Cup (before UEFA) ====
Club	Winners	Runners-up	Years won	Years runners-up
Perugia	1	0	1978	—
Padova	0	1	—	1963

=== Other tournaments ===
==== Mitropa Cup ====
Club	Winners	Runners-up	Years won	Years runners-up
Bologna	3	2	1932, 1934, 1961	1962, 1989
Pisa	2	1	1986, 1988	1991
Fiorentina	1	2	1966	1965, 1972
Milan	1	–	1982	–
Torino	1	–	1991	–
Udinese	1	–	1980	–
Ascoli	1	–	1987	–
Bari	1	–	1990	–
Internazionale	–	1	–	1933
Lazio	–	1	–	1937
Atalanta	–	1	–	1985
Genoa	–	1	–	1990

==== Latin Cup ====
Club	Winners	Runners-up	Years won	Years runners-up
Milan	2	1	1951, 1956	1953

=== Worldwide competitions ===
==== Intercontinental Cup ====
Club	Winners	Runners-up	Years won	Years runners-up
Milan	3	4	1969, 1989, 1990	1963, 1993, 1994, 2003
Juventus	2	1	1985, 1996	1973
Internazionale	2	0	1964, 1965	—

==== FIFA Club World Cup ====
Club	Winners	Runners-up	Years won	Years runners-up
Milan	1	0	2007	—
Internazionale	1	0	2010	—

== Full record ==
Note: Clubs in bold won the respective season's competition.

=== European competitions ===
==== UEFA Champions League/European Cup ====
The competition was named European Cup until 1991–92, after which it switched its name to UEFA Champions League.

Season	Team	Progress	Aggregate	Opponents	Results
1955–56	Milan	Semi-finals	4–5	(Spain) **Real Madrid**	2–1 at home, 2–4 away
1956–57	Fiorentina	Final	N/A	(Spain) **Real Madrid**	0–2
1957–58	Milan	Final	N/A	(Spain) **Real Madrid**	2–3 (a.e.t.)
1958–59	Juventus	Preliminary round	3–8	(Austria) Wiener Sport-Club	3–1 at home, 0–7 away
1959–60	Milan	Round of 16	1–7	(Spain) Barcelona	0–2 at home, 1–5 away
1960–61	Juventus	Preliminary round	3–4	(Bulgaria) CSKA Sofia	2–0 at home, 1–4 away
1961–62	Juventus	Quarter-finals	1–1	(Spain) Real Madrid	1–0 at home, 0–1 away, 1–3 neutral
1962–63	**Milan**	**Winners**	N/A	(Portugal) Benfica	2–1
1963–64	**Internazionale**	**Winners**	N/A	(Spain) Real Madrid	3–1
1963–64	Milan	Quarter-finals	3–4	(Spain) Real Madrid	2–0 at home, 1–4 away
1964–65	**Internazionale**	**Winners**	N/A	(Portugal) Benfica	1–0
1964–65	Bologna	Preliminary round	2–2	(Belgium) Anderlecht	2–1 at home, 0–1 away
1965–66	Internazionale	Semi-finals	2–1	(Spain) **Real Madrid**	1–1 at home, 0–1 away
1966–67	Internazionale	Final	N/A	(Scotland) **Celtic**	1–2
1967–68	Juventus	Semi-finals	0–3	(Portugal) Benfica	0–1 at home, 0–2 away
1968–69	**Milan**	**Winners**	N/A	(Netherlands) Ajax	4–1
1969–70	Fiorentina	Quarter-finals	1–3	(Scotland) Celtic	1–0 at home, 0–3 away
1969–70	Milan	Second round	1–2	(Netherlands) **Feyenoord**	1–0 at home, 0–2 away
1970–71	Cagliari	Second round	2–4	(Spain) Atlético Madrid	2–1 at home, 0–3 away
1971–72	Internazionale	Final	N/A	(Netherlands) **Ajax**	0–2
1972–73	Juventus	Final	N/A	(Netherlands) **Ajax**	0–1
1973–74	Juventus	First round	3–4	(East Germany) Dynamo Dresden	3–2 at home, 0–2 away
1974–75	Lazio	(not admitted to cup)			
1975–76	Juventus	Second round	2–4	(Germany) Borussia Mönchengladbach	2–2 at home, 0–2 away
1976–77	Torino	Second round	1–2	(Germany) Borussia Mönchengladbach	1–2 at home, 0–0 away
1977–78	Juventus	Semi-finals	1–2	(Belgium) Club Brugge	1–0 at home, 0–2 away
1978–79	Juventus	First round	1–2	(Scotland) Rangers	1–0 at home, 0–2 away
1979–80	Milan	First round	0–1	(Portugal) Porto	0–0 at home, 0–1 away
1980–81	Internazionale	Semi-finals	1–2	(Spain) Real Madrid	1–0 at home, 0–2 away
1981–82	Juventus	Second round	2–4	(Belgium) Anderlecht	1–1 at home, 1–3 away
1982–83	Juventus	Final	N/A	(Germany) **Hamburger SV**	0–1
1983–84	Roma	Final	N/A	(England) **Liverpool**	1–1 (a.e.t.) (2–4 p)
1984–85	**Juventus**	**Winners**	N/A	(England) Liverpool	1–0
1985–86	Juventus	Quarter-finals	1–2	(Spain) Barcelona	1–1 at home, 0–1 away
1985–86	Hellas Verona	Second round	0–2	(Italy) Juventus	0–0 at home, 0–2 away
1986–87	Juventus	Second round	1–1 (1–3 p)	(Spain) Real Madrid	1–0 at home, 0–1 away
1987–88	Napoli	First round	1–3	(Spain) Real Madrid	1–1 at home, 0–2 away
1988–89	**Milan**	**Winners**	N/A	(Romania) Steaua București	4–0
1989–90	**Milan**	**Winners**	N/A	(Portugal) Benfica	1–0
1989–90	Internazionale	First round	1–2	(Sweden) Malmö FF	1–1 at home, 0–1 away
1990–91	Milan	Quarter-finals	1–4	(France) Marseille	1–1 at home, 0–3 away (Note: With the score 1–0 to Marseille after 87 mins, the floodlights failed. Milan refused to play on when lighting was restored and Marseille were awarded the match 3–0.)
1990–91	Napoli	Second round	0–0 (3–5 p)	(Soviet Union) Spartak Moscow	0–0 at home, 0–0 away
1991–92	Sampdoria	Final	N/A	**(Spain) Barcelona**	0–1 (a.e.t.)
1992–93	Milan	Final	N/A	(France) **Marseille**	0–1
1993–94	**Milan**	**Winners**	N/A	(Spain) Barcelona	4–0
1994–95	Milan	Final	N/A	(Netherlands) **Ajax**	0–1
1995–96	**Juventus**	**Winners**	N/A	(Netherlands) Ajax	1–1 (a.e.t.) (4–2 p)
1996–97	Juventus	Final	N/A	**(Germany) Borussia Dortmund**	1–3
1996–97	Milan	3rd in Group stage	N/A	(Portugal) Porto, (Norway) Rosenborg, (Sweden) IFK Göteborg	
1997–98	Juventus	Final	N/A	(Spain) **Real Madrid**	0–1
1997–98	Parma	2nd in Group stage	N/A	(Germany) Borussia Dortmund, (Czech Republic) Sparta Prague, (Turkey) Galatasaray	
1998–99	Juventus	Semi-finals	3–4	(England) **Manchester United**	2–3 at home, 1–1 away
1998–99	Internazionale	Quarter-finals	1–3	(England) **Manchester United**	1–1 at home, 0–2 away
1999–2000	Lazio	Quarter-finals	3–5	(Spain) Valencia	1–0 at home, 2–5 away
1999–2000	Fiorentina	3rd in Second group stage	N/A	(England) Manchester United, (Spain) Valencia, (France) Bordeaux	
1999–2000	Milan	4th in First group stage	N/A	(England) Chelsea, (Germany) Hertha BSC, (Turkey) Galatasaray	
1999–2000	Parma	Third qualifying round	1–2	(Scotland) Rangers	1–0 at home, 0–2 away
2000–01	Milan	3rd in Second group stage	N/A	(Spain) Deportivo La Coruña, (France) Paris Saint-Germain, (Turkey) Galatasaray	
2000–01	Lazio	4th in Second group stage	N/A	(Spain) Real Madrid, (England) Leeds United, (Belgium) Anderlecht	
2000–01	Juventus	4th in First group stage	N/A	(Spain) Deportivo La Coruña, (Greece) Panathinaikos, (Germany) Hamburger SV	
2000–01	Internazionale	Third qualifying round	0–1	(Sweden) Helsingborgs IF	0–0 at home, 0–1 away
2001–02	Roma	3rd in Second group stage	N/A	(Spain) Barcelona, (England) Liverpool, (Turkey) Galatasaray	
2001–02	Juventus	4th in Second group stage	N/A	(Germany) Bayer Leverkusen, (Spain) Deportivo La Coruña, (England) Arsenal	
2001–02	Lazio	4th in First group stage	N/A	(France) Nantes, (Turkey) Galatasaray, (Netherlands) PSV Eindhoven	
2001–02	Parma	Third qualifying round	1–2	(France) Lille	0–2 at home, 1–0 away
2002–03	**Milan**	**Winners**	N/A	(Italy) Juventus	0–0 (a.e.t.) (3–2 p)
2002–03	Juventus	Final	N/A	**(Italy) Milan**	0–0 (a.e.t.) (2–3 p)
2002–03	Internazionale	Semi-finals	1–1 (a)	**(Italy) Milan**	1–1 at home, 0–0 away
2002–03	Roma	4th in Second group stage	N/A	(Netherlands) Ajax, (Spain) Valencia, (England) Arsenal	
2003–04	Milan	Quarter-finals	4–5	(Spain) Deportivo La Coruña	4–1 at home, 0–4 away
2003–04	Juventus	Round of 16	0–2	(Spain) Deportivo La Coruña	0–1 at home, 0–1 away
2003–04	Internazionale	3rd in Group stage	N/A	(England) Arsenal, (Russia) Lokomotiv Moscow, (Ukraine) Dynamo Kyiv	
2003–04	Lazio	4th in Group stage	N/A	(England) Chelsea, (Czech Republic) Sparta Prague, (Turkey) Beşiktaş	
2004–05	Milan	Final	N/A	**(England) Liverpool**	3–3 (a.e.t.) (2–3 p)
2004–05	Juventus	Quarter-finals	1–2	**(England) Liverpool**	0–0 at home, 1–2 away
2004–05	Internazionale	Quarter-finals	0–3	(Italy) Milan	0–3 at home, (Note: The match was abandoned after 73 minutes while Milan led 0–1 due to flares thrown onto the pitch by Internazionale fans, one of which struck Milan goalkeeper Dida. UEFA awarded Milan a 3–0 win.) 0–2 away
2004–05	Roma	4th in Group stage	N/A	(Germany) Bayer Leverkusen, (Spain) Real Madrid, (Ukraine) Dynamo Kyiv	
2005–06	Milan	Semi-finals	0–1	(Spain) **Barcelona**	0–1 at home, 0–0 away
2005–06	Internazionale	Quarter-finals	2–2 (a)	(Spain) Villarreal	2–1 at home, 0–1 away
2005–06	Juventus	Quarter-finals	0–2	(England) Arsenal	0–0 at home, 0–2 away
2005–06	Udinese	3rd in Group stage	N/A	(Spain) Barcelona, (Germany) Werder Bremen, (Greece) Panathinaikos	
2006–07	**Milan**	**Winners**	N/A	(England) Liverpool	2–1
2006–07	Roma	Quarter-finals	3–8	(England) Manchester United	2–1 at home, 1–7 away
2006–07	Internazionale	Round of 16	2–2	(Spain) Valencia	2–2 at home, 0–0 away
2006–07	Chievo	Third qualifying round	2–4	(Bulgaria) Levski Sofia	2–2 at home, 0–2 away
2007–08	Roma	Quarter-finals	0–3	(England) **Manchester United**	0–2 at home, 0–1 away
2007–08	Internazionale	Round of 16	0–3	(England) Liverpool	0–1 at home, 0–2 away
2007–08	Milan	Round of 16	0–2	(England) Arsenal	0–2 at home, 0–0 away
2007–08	Lazio	4th in Group stage	N/A	(Spain) Real Madrid, (Greece) Olympiacos, (Germany) Werder Bremen	
2008–09	Internazionale	Round of 16	0–2	(England) Manchester United	0–0 at home, 0–2 away
2008–09	Roma	Round of 16	1–1 (6–7 p)	(England) Arsenal	1–0 at home, 0–1 away
2008–09	Juventus	Round of 16	2–3	(England) Chelsea	2–2 at home, 0–1 away
2008–09	Fiorentina	3rd in Group stage	N/A	(Germany) Bayern Munich, (France) Lyon, (Romania) Steaua București	
2009–10	**Internazionale**	**Winners**	N/A	(Germany) Bayern Munich	2–0
2009–10	Milan	Round of 16	2–7	(England) Manchester United	2–3 at home, 0–4 away
2009–10	Fiorentina	Round of 16	4–4 (a)	(Germany) Bayern Munich	3–2 at home, 1–2 away
2009–10	Juventus	3rd in Group stage	N/A	(France) Bordeaux, (Germany) Bayern Munich, (Israel) Maccabi Haifa	
2010–11	Internazionale	Quarter-finals	3–7	(Germany) Schalke 04	2–5 at home, 1–2 away
2010–11	Roma	Round of 16	2–6	(Ukraine) Shakhtar Donetsk	2–3 at home, 0–3 away
2010–11	Milan	Round of 16	0–1	(England) Tottenham Hotspur	0–1 at home, 0–0 away
2010–11	Sampdoria	Play-off round	4–5	(Germany) Werder Bremen	3–2 at home (a.e.t.), 1–3 away
2011–12	Milan	Quarter-finals	1–3	(Spain) Barcelona	0–0 at home, 1–3 away
2011–12	Internazionale	Round of 16	2–2 (a)	(France) Marseille	2–1 at home, 0–1 away
2011–12	Napoli	Round of 16	4–5	(England) **Chelsea**	3–1 at home, 1–4 away (a.e.t.)
2011–12	Udinese	Play-off round	1–3	(England) Arsenal	1–2 at home, 0–1 away
2012–13	Juventus	Quarter-finals	0–4	**(Germany) Bayern Munich**	0–2 at home, 0–2 away
2012–13	Milan	Round of 16	2–4	(Spain) Barcelona	2–0 at home, 0–4 away
2012–13	Udinese	Play-off round	2–2 (4–5 p)	(Portugal) Braga	1–1 at home, 1–1 away
2013–14	Milan	Round of 16	1–5	(Spain) Atlético Madrid	0–1 at home, 1–4 away
2013–14	Juventus	3rd in Group stage	N/A	(Spain) **Real Madrid**, (Turkey) Galatasaray, (Denmark) Copenhagen	
2013–14	Napoli	3rd in Group stage	N/A	(Germany) Borussia Dortmund, (England) Arsenal, (France) Marseille	
2014–15	Juventus	Final	N/A	**(Spain) Barcelona**	1–3
2014–15	Roma	3rd in Group stage	N/A	(Germany) Bayern Munich, (England) Manchester City, (Russia) CSKA Moscow	
2014–15	Napoli	Play-off round	2–4	(Spain) Athletic Bilbao	1–1 at home, 1–3 away
2015–16	Juventus	Round of 16	4–6	(Germany) Bayern Munich	2–2 at home, 2–4 away (a.e.t.)
2015–16	Roma	Round of 16	0–4	**(Spain) Real Madrid**	0–2 at home, 0–2 away
2015–16	Lazio	Play-off round	1–3	(Germany) Bayer Leverkusen	1–0 at home, 0–3 away
2016–17	Juventus	Final	N/A	**(Spain) Real Madrid**	1–4
2016–17	Napoli	Round of 16	2–6	**(Spain) Real Madrid**	1–3 at home, 1–3 away
2016–17	Roma	Play-off round	1–4	(Portugal) Porto	0–3 at home, 1–1 away
2017–18	Roma	Semi-finals	6–7	(England) Liverpool	4–2 at home, 2–5 away
2017–18	Juventus	Quarter-finals	3–4	**(Spain) Real Madrid**	0–3 at home, 3–1 away
2017–18	Napoli	3rd in Group stage	N/A	(England) Manchester City, (Ukraine) Shakhtar Donetsk, (Netherlands) Feyenoord	
2018–19	Juventus	Quarter-finals	2–3	(Netherlands) Ajax	1–2 at home, 1–1 away
2018–19	Roma	Round of 16	3–4	(Portugal) Porto	2–1 at home, 1–3 away (a.e.t.)
2018–19	Napoli	3rd in Group stage	N/A	(France) Paris Saint-Germain, (England) **Liverpool**, (Serbia) Red Star Belgrade	
2018–19	Internazionale	3rd in Group stage	N/A	(Spain) Barcelona, (England) Tottenham Hotspur, (Netherlands) PSV Eindhoven	
2019–20	Atalanta	Quarter-finals	N/A	(France) Paris Saint-Germain	1–2
2019–20	Juventus	Round of 16	2–2 (a)	(France) Lyon	2–1 at home, 0–1 away
2019–20	Napoli	Round of 16	2–4	(Spain) Barcelona	1–1 at home, 1–3 away
2019–20	Internazionale	3rd in Group stage	N/A	(Spain) Barcelona, (Germany) Borussia Dortmund, (Czech Republic) Slavia Prague	
2020–21	Juventus	Round of 16	4–4 (a)	(Portugal) Porto	3–2 at home (a.e.t.), 1–2 away
2020–21	Atalanta	Round of 16	1–4	(Spain) Real Madrid	0–1 at home, 1–3 away
2020–21	Lazio	Round of 16	2–6	(Germany) Bayern Munich	1–4 at home, 1–2 away
2020–21	Internazionale	4th in Group stage	N/A	(Spain) Real Madrid, (Germany) Borussia Mönchengladbach, (Ukraine) Shakhtar Donetsk	
2021–22	Juventus	Round of 16	1–4	(Spain) Villarreal	0–3 at home, 1–1 away
2021–22	Internazionale	Round of 16	1–2	(England) Liverpool	0–2 at home, 1–0 away
2021–22	Atalanta	3rd in Group stage	N/A	(England) Manchester United, (Spain) Villarreal, (Switzerland) Young Boys	
2021–22	Milan	4th in Group stage	N/A	(England) Liverpool, (Spain) Atlético Madrid, (Portugal) Porto	
2022–23	Internazionale	Final	N/A	**(England) Manchester City**	0–1
2022–23	Milan	Semi-finals	0–3	(Italy) Internazionale	0–2 at home, 0–1 away
2022–23	Napoli	Quarter-finals	1–2	(Italy) Milan	1–1 at home, 0–1 away
2022–23	Juventus	3rd in Group stage	N/A	(Portugal) Benfica, (France) Paris Saint-Germain, (Israel) Maccabi Haifa	
2023–24	Internazionale	Round of 16	2–2 (2–3 p)	(Spain) Atlético Madrid	1–0 at home, 1–2 away (a.e.t.)
2023–24	Lazio	Round of 16	1–3	(Germany) Bayern Munich	1–0 at home, 0–3 away
2023–24	Napoli	Round of 16	2–4	(Spain) Barcelona	1–1 at home, 1–3 away
2023–24	Milan	3rd in Group stage	N/A	(Germany) Borussia Dortmund, (France) Paris Saint-Germain, (England) Newcastle United	
2024–25	Internazionale	Final	N/A	**(France) Paris Saint-Germain**	0–5
2024–25	Atalanta	Knockout phase play-offs	2–5	(Belgium) Club Brugge	1–3 at home, 1–2 away
2024–25	Juventus	Knockout phase play-offs	3–4	(Netherlands) PSV Eindhoven	2–1 at home, 1–3 away (a.e.t.)
2024–25	Milan	Knockout phase play-offs	1–2	(Netherlands) Feyenoord	1–1 at home, 0–1 away
2024–25	Bologna	League phase	N/A	28th place	
2025–26	Atalanta	Round of 16	2–10	(Germany) Bayern Munich	1–6 at home, 1–4 away
2025–26	Internazionale	Knockout phase play-offs	2–5	(Norway) Bodø/Glimt	1–2 at home, 1–3 away
2025–26	Juventus	Knockout phase play-offs	5–7	(Turkey) Galatasaray	3–2 at home (a.e.t.), 2–5 away
2025–26	Napoli	League phase	N/A	30th place	
2026–27	Internazionale				
2026–27	Napoli				
2026–27	Roma				
2026–27	Como				

==== UEFA Europa League/UEFA Cup ====
The competition was named UEFA Cup until 2008–09, after which it switched its name to UEFA Europa League.

Season	Team	Progress	Aggregate	Opponents	Results
1971–72	Milan	Semi-finals	2–3	(England) **Tottenham Hotspur**	1–1 at home, 1–2 away
1971–72	Juventus	Quarter-finals	2–3	(England) Wolverhampton Wanderers	1–1 at home, 1–2 away
1971–72	Bologna	Second round	3–3 (a)	(Socialist Federal Republic of Yugoslavia) Željezničar	2–2 at home, 1–1 away
1971–72	Napoli	First round	1–2	(Romania) Rapid București	1–0 at home, 0–2 away
1972–73	Internazionale	Third round	1–2	(Portugal) Vitória de Setúbal	1–0 at home, 0–2 away
1972–73	Fiorentina	Second round	2–2 (a)	(Portugal) Vitória de Setúbal	2–1 at home, 0–1 away
1972–73	Cagliari	First round	1–3	(Greece) Olympiacos	0–1 at home, 1–2 away
1972–73	Torino	First round	2–4	(Spain) Las Palmas	2–0 at home, 0–4 away
1973–74	Lazio	Second round	4–6	(England) Ipswich Town	4–2 at home, 0–4 away
1973–74	Internazionale	First round	2–2 (a)	(Austria) Admira Wacker	2–1 at home, 0–1 away
1973–74	Fiorentina	First round	0–1	(Romania) Universitatea Craiova	0–0 at home, 0–1 away
1973–74	Torino	First round	2–4	(East Germany) Lokomotive Leipzig	1–2 at home, 1–2 away
1974–75	Juventus	Semi-finals	1–4	(Netherlands) Twente	0–1 at home, 1–3 away
1974–75	Napoli	Third round	1–3	(Czechoslovakia) Baník Ostrava	0–2 at home, 1–1 away
1974–75	Internazionale	First round	1–2	(Netherlands) FC Amsterdam	1–2 at home, 0–0 away
1974–75	Torino	First round	2–4	(West Germany) Fortuna Düsseldorf	1–1 at home, 1–3 away
1975–76	Milan	Quarter-finals	2–3	(Belgium) Club Brugge	2–1 at home, 0–2 away
1975–76	Roma	Third round	0–2	(Belgium) Club Brugge	0–1 at home, 0–1 away
1975–76	Lazio	Second round	0–7	(Spain) Barcelona	0–3 at home, 0–4 away
1975–76	Napoli	First round	2–5	(Soviet Union) Torpedo Moscow	1–1 at home, 1–4 away
1976–77	**Juventus**	**Winners**	2–2 (a)	(Spain) Athletic Bilbao	1–0 at home, 1–2 away
1976–77	Milan	Third round	4–5	(Spain) Athletic Bilbao	3–1 at home, 1–4 away
1976–77	Internazionale	First round	1–2	(Hungary) Budapest Honvéd	0–1 at home, 1–1 away
1976–77	Cesena	First round	3–4	(East Germany) 1. FC Magdeburg	3–1 at home, 0–3 away
1977–78	Torino	Third round	3–5	(France) Bastia	2–3 at home, 1–2 away
1977–78	Lazio	Second round	2–6	(France) Lens	2–0 at home, 0–6 away (a.e.t.)
1977–78	Internazionale	First round	0–1	(Soviet Union) Dinamo Tbilisi	0–1 at home, 0–0 away
1977–78	Fiorentina	First round	1–5	(West Germany) Schalke 04	0–0 at home, (Note: UEFA invalidated this game and awarded a 3–0 victory to Schalke 04 as Fiorentina fielded an ineligible player, Gianfranco Casarsa.) 1–2 away
1978–79	Milan	Third round	2–5	(England) Manchester City	2–2 at home, 0–3 away
1978–79	Torino	First round	1–3	(Spain) Sporting Gijón	1–0 at home, 0–3 away
1978–79	Lanerossi Vicenza	First round	1–2	(Czechoslovakia) Dukla Prague	1–1 at home, 0–1 away
1978–79	Napoli	First round	1–3	(Soviet Union) Dinamo Tbilisi	1–1 at home, 0–2 away
1979–80	Perugia	Second round	1–4	(Greece) Aris	0–3 at home, 1–1 away
1979–80	Internazionale	Second round	3–4	(West Germany) Borussia Mönchengladbach	2–3 at home (a.e.t.), 1–1 away
1979–80	Napoli	Second round	2–3	(Belgium) Standard Liège	1–1 at home, 1–2 away
1979–80	Torino	First round	2–2 (a)	(West Germany) VfB Stuttgart	2–1 at home, 0–1 away
1980–81	Torino	Third round	3–3 (3–4 p)	(Switzerland) Grasshopper	2–1 at home, 1–2 away
1980–81	Juventus	Second round	4–4 (1–4 p)	(Poland) Widzew Łódź	3–1 at home, 1–3 away
1981–82	Internazionale	Second round	3–4	(Romania) Dinamo București	1–1 at home, 2–3 away (a.e.t.)
1981–82	Napoli	Second round	2–2 (a)	(Socialist Federal Republic of Yugoslavia) Radnički Niš	2–2 at home, 0–0 away
1982–83	Roma	Quarter-finals	2–3	(Portugal) Benfica	1–2 at home, 1–1 away
1982–83	Napoli	Second round	1–4	(West Germany) 1. FC Kaiserslautern	1–2 at home, 0–2 away
1982–83	Fiorentina	First round	2–3	(Romania) Universitatea Craiova	1–0 at home, 1–3 away
1983–84	Internazionale	Third round	2–3	Austria Wien	1–1 at home, 1–2 away
1983–84	Hellas Verona	Second round	2–2 (a)	(Austria) Sturm Graz	2–2 at home, 0–0 away
1984–85	Internazionale	Semi-finals	2–3	(Spain) **Real Madrid**	2–0 at home, 0–3 away
1984–85	Fiorentina	Second round	3–7	(Belgium) Anderlecht	1–1 at home, 2–6 away
1985–86	Internazionale	Semi-finals	4–6	(Spain) **Real Madrid**	3–1 at home, 1–5 away (a.e.t.)
1985–86	Milan	Third round	2–3	(Belgium) Waregem	1–2 at home, 1–1 away
1985–86	Torino	Second round	2–4	(Socialist Federal Republic of Yugoslavia) Hajduk Split	1–1 at home, 1–3 away
1986–87	Internazionale	Quarter-finals	1–1 (a)	(Sweden) **IFK Göteborg**	1–1 at home, 0–0 away
1986–87	Torino	Quarter-finals	1–2	(Austria) Swarovski Tirol	0–0 at home, 1–2 away
1986–87	Fiorentina	First round	1–1 (1–3 p)	(Portugal) Boavista	1–0 at home, 0–1 away
1986–87	Napoli	First round	1–1 (3–4 p)	(France) Toulouse	1–0 at home, 0–1 away
1987–88	Hellas Verona	Quarter-finals	1–2	(West Germany) Werder Bremen	0–1 at home, 1–1 away
1987–88	Internazionale	Third round	1–2	(Spain) Espanyol	1–1 at home, 0–1 away
1987–88	Juventus	Second round	3–3 (a)	(Greece) Panathinaikos	3–2 at home, 0–1 away
1987–88	Milan	Second round	0–2	(Spain) Espanyol	0–2 at home, 0–0 away
1988–89	**Napoli**	**Winners**	5–4	(Germany) VfB Stuttgart	2–1 at home, 3–3 away
1988–89	Juventus	Quarter-finals	2–3	**(Italy) Napoli**	2–0 at home, 0–3 away (a.e.t.)
1988–89	Roma	Third round	0–4	(East Germany) Dynamo Dresden	0–2 at home, 0–2 away
1988–89	Internazionale	Third round	3–3 (a)	(West Germany) Bayern Munich	1–3 at home, 2–0 away
1989–90	**Juventus**	**Winners**	3–1	(Italy) Fiorentina	3–1 at home, 0–0 away
1989–90	Fiorentina	Final	1–3	**(Italy) Juventus**	0–0 at home, 1–3 away
1989–90	Napoli	Third round	3–8	(West Germany) Werder Bremen	2–3 at home, 1–5 away
1989–90	Atalanta	First round	0–2	(Soviet Union) Spartak Moscow	0–0 at home, 0–2 away
1990–91	**Internazionale**	**Winners**	2–1	(Italy) Roma	2–0 at home, 0–1 away
1990–91	Roma	Final	1–2	**(Italy) Internazionale**	1–0 at home, 0–2 away
1990–91	Bologna	Quarter-finals	1–3	(Portugal) Sporting CP	1–1 at home, 0–2 away
1990–91	Atalanta	Quarter-finals	0–2	(Italy) **Internazionale**	0–0 at home, 0–2 away
1991–92	Torino	Final	2–2 (a)	**(Netherlands) Ajax**	2–2 at home, 0–0 away
1991–92	Genoa	Semi-finals	3–4	**(Netherlands) Ajax**	2–3 at home, 1–1 away
1991–92	Internazionale	First round	1–2	(Portugal) Boavista	0–0 at home, 1–2 away
1991–92	Parma	First round	1–1 (a)	(Bulgaria) CSKA Sofia	1–1 at home, 0–0 away
1992–93	**Juventus**	**Winners**	6–1	(Germany) Borussia Dortmund	3–0 at home, 3–1 away
1992–93	Roma	Quarter-finals	1–2	(Germany) Borussia Dortmund	1–0 at home, 0–2 away
1992–93	Napoli	Second round	0–2	(France) Paris Saint-Germain	0–2 at home, 0–0 away
1992–93	Torino	Second round	1–2	(Russia) Dynamo Moscow	1–2 at home, 0–0 away
1993–94	**Internazionale**	**Winners**	2–0	Austria Salzburg	1–0 at home, 1–0 away
1993–94	Cagliari	Semi-finals	3–5	(Italy) **Internazionale**	3–2 at home, 0–3 away
1993–94	Juventus	Quarter-finals	1–3	(Italy) Cagliari	0–1 at home, 1–2 away
1993–94	Lazio	Second round	1–2	(Portugal) Boavista	1–0 at home, 0–2 away
1994–95	**Parma**	**Winners**	2–1	(Italy) Juventus	1–0 at home, 1–1 away
1994–95	Juventus	Final	1–2	**(Italy) Parma**	1–1 at home, 0–1 away
1994–95	Lazio	Quarter-finals	1–2	(Germany) Borussia Dortmund	1–0 at home, 0–2 away
1994–95	Napoli	Third round	0–2	(Germany) Eintracht Frankfurt	0–1 at home, 0–1 away
1994–95	Internazionale	First round	1–1 (3–4 p)	(England) Aston Villa	1–0 at home, 0–1 away
1995–96	Milan	Quarter-finals	2–3	(France) Bordeaux	2–0 at home, 0–3 away
1995–96	Roma	Quarter-finals	3–3 (a)	(Czech Republic) Slavia Prague	3–1 at home (a.e.t.), 0–2 away
1995–96	Lazio	Second round	1–4	(France) Lyon	0–2 at home, 1–2 away
1995–96	Internazionale	First round	1–2	(Switzerland) Lugano	0–1 at home, 1–1 away
1996–97	Internazionale	Final	1–1 (1–4 p)	(West Germany) **Schalke 04**	1–0 at home, 0–1 away
1996–97	Roma	Second round	2–4	(Germany) Karlsruher SC	2–1 at home, 0–3 away
1996–97	Lazio	Second round	4–5	(Spain) Tenerife	1–0 at home, 3–5 away
1996–97	Parma	First round	2–3	(Portugal) Vitória de Guimarães	2–1 at home, 0–2 away
1997–98	**Internazionale**	**Winners**	N/A	(Italy) Lazio	3–0
1997–98	Lazio	Final	N/A	(Italy) **Internazionale**	0–3
1997–98	Udinese	Second round	2–3	(Netherlands) Ajax	2–1 at home, 0–1 away
1997–98	Sampdoria	First round	1–4	(Spain) Athletic Bilbao	1–2 at home, 0–2 away
1998–99	**Parma**	**Winners**	N/A	(France) Marseille	3–0
1998–99	Bologna	Semi-finals	1–1 (a)	(France) Marseille	1–1 at home, 0–0 away
1998–99	Roma	Quarter-finals	2–4	(Spain) Atlético Madrid	1–2 at home, 1–2 away
1998–99	Fiorentina	Second round	2–3	(Switzerland) Grasshoppers	0–3 at home, (Note: Abandoned at half-time after official was injured by firework while Fiorentina led 2–1. The match was awarded 0–3 to Grasshoppers.) 2–0 away
1998–99	Udinese	First round	1–2	(Germany) Bayer Leverkusen	1–1 at home, 0–1 away
1999–2000	Parma	Fourth round	2–3	(Germany) Werder Bremen	1–0 at home, 1–3 away
1999–2000	Roma	Fourth round	0–1	(England) Leeds United	0–0 at home, 0–1 away
1999–2000	Udinese	Fourth round	2–2 (a)	(Czech Republic) Slavia Prague	2–1 at home, 0–1 away
1999–2000	Juventus	Fourth round	1–4	(Spain) Celta Vigo	1–0 at home, 0–4 away
1999–2000	Bologna	Third round	2–3	(Turkey) **Galatasaray**	1–1 at home, 1–2 away
2000–01	Roma	Fourth round	1–2	(England) **Liverpool**	0–2 at home, 1–0 away
2000–01	Internazionale	Fourth round	3–5	(Spain) Alavés	0–2 at home, 3–3 away
2000–01	Parma	Fourth round	4–4 (a)	(Netherlands) PSV Eindhoven	3–2 at home, 1–2 away
2000–01	Udinese	Second round	1–3	(Greece) PAOK	1–0 at home, 0–3 away (a.e.t.)
2000–01	Fiorentina	First round	3–5	(Austria) Tirol Innsbruck	2–2 at home, 1–3 away
2001–02	Internazionale	Semi-finals	2–3	**(Netherlands) Feyenoord**	0–1 at home, 2–2 away
2001–02	Milan	Semi-finals	3–5	(Germany) Borussia Dortmund	3–1 at home, 0–4 away
2001–02	Parma	Fourth round	1–2	(Israel) Hapoel Tel Aviv	1–2 at home, 0–0 away
2001–02	Fiorentina	Third round	0–3	(France) Lille	0–1 at home, 0–2 away
2002–03	Lazio	Semi-finals	1–4	(Portugal) **Porto**	0–0 at home, 1–4 away
2002–03	Parma	Second round	3–5	(Poland) Wisła Kraków	2–1 at home, 1–4 away (a.e.t.)
2002–03	Chievo	First round	0–2	(Serbia and Montenegro) Red Star Belgrade	0–0 at home, 0–2 away
2003–04	Internazionale	Quarter-finals	0–2	(France) Marseille	0–1 at home, 0–1 away
2003–04	Roma	Fourth round	3–4	(Spain) Villarreal	2–1 at home, 0–2 away
2003–04	Parma	Third round	0–4	(Turkey) Gençlerbirliği	0–1 at home, 0–3 away
2003–04	Udinese	First round	2–2 (a)	Austria Salzburg	1–2 at home, 1–0 away
2004–05	Parma	Semi-finals	0–3	(Russia) **CSKA Moscow**	0–0 at home, 0–3 away
2004–05	Lazio	5th in Group stage	N/A	(England) Middlesbrough, (Spain) Villarreal, (Serbia and Montenegro) Partizan, (Greece) Egaleo	
2004–05	Udinese	First round	2–3	(Greece) Panionios	1–0 at home, 1–3 away
2005–06	Roma	Round of 16	2–2 (a)	(England) Middlesbrough	2–1 at home, 0–1 away
2005–06	Palermo	Round of 16	1–3	(West Germany) Schalke 04	1–0 at home, 0–3 away
2005–06	Udinese	Round of 16	1–2	(Bulgaria) Levski Sofia	0–0 at home, 1–2 away
2005–06	Sampdoria	4th in Group stage	N/A	(Romania) Steaua București, (France) Lens, (Germany) Hertha BSC, (Sweden) Halmstads BK	
2006–07	Livorno	Round of 32	1–4	(Spain) Espanyol	1–2 at home, 0–2 away
2006–07	Parma	Round of 32	0–2	(Portugal) Braga	0–1 at home, 0–1 away
2006–07	Palermo	4th in Group stage	N/A	(England) Newcastle United, (Spain) Celta Vigo, (Turkey) Fenerbahçe, (Germany) Eintracht Frankfurt	
2006–07	Chievo	First round	2–3	(Portugal) Braga	2–1 at home (a.e.t.), 0–2 away
2007–08	Fiorentina	Semi-finals	0–0 (2–4 p)	(Scotland) Rangers	0–0 at home, 0–0 away
2007–08	Palermo	First round	1–1 (2–4 p)	(Czech Republic) Mladá Boleslav	0–1 at home, 1–0 away
2007–08	Sampdoria	First round	2–2 (a)	(Denmark) AaB	2–2 at home, 0–0 away
2007–08	Empoli	First round	2–4	(Switzerland) Zürich	2–1 at home, 0–3 away
2008–09	Udinese	Quarter-finals	4–6	(Germany) Werder Bremen	3–3 at home, 1–3 away
2008–09	Milan	Round of 32	3–3 (a)	(Germany) Werder Bremen	2–2 at home, 1–1 away
2008–09	Fiorentina	Round of 32	1–2	(Netherlands) Ajax	0–1 at home, 1–1 away
2008–09	Sampdoria	Round of 32	0–3	(Ukraine) Metalist Kharkiv	0–1 at home, 0–2 away
2008–09	Napoli	First round	3–4	(Portugal) Benfica	3–2 at home, 0–2 away
2009–10	Juventus	Round of 16	4–5	(England) Fulham	3–1 at home, 1–4 away
2009–10	Roma	Round of 16	4–6	(Greece) Panathinaikos	2–3 at home, 2–3 away
2009–10	Lazio	3rd in Group stage	N/A	(Austria) Red Bull Salzburg, (Spain) Villarreal, (Bulgaria) Levski Sofia	
2009–10	Genoa	3rd in Group stage	N/A	(Spain) Valencia, (France) Lille, (Czech Republic) Slavia Prague	
2010–11	Napoli	Round of 32	1–2	(Spain) Villarreal	0–0 at home, 1–2 away
2010–11	Juventus	3rd in Group stage	N/A	(England) Manchester City, (Poland) Lech Poznań, (Austria) Red Bull Salzburg	
2010–11	Palermo	3rd in Group stage	N/A	(Russia) CSKA Moscow, (Czech Republic) Sparta Praguel, (Switzerland) Lausanne-Sport	
2010–11	Sampdoria	3rd in Group stage	N/A	(Netherlands) PSV Eindhoven, (Ukraine) Metalist Kharkiv, (Hungary) Debrecen	
2011–12	Udinese	Round of 16	2–3	(Netherlands) AZ	2–1 at home, 0–2 away
2011–12	Lazio	Round of 32	1–4	(Spain) **Atlético Madrid**	1–3 at home, 0–1 away
2011–12	Roma	Play-off round	1–2	(Slovakia) Slovan Bratislava	1–1 at home, 0–1 away
2011–12	Palermo	Third qualifying round	3–3 (a)	(Switzerland) Thun	2–2 at home, 1–1 away
2012–13	Lazio	Quarter-finals	1–3	(Turkey) Fenerbahçe	1–1 at home, 0–2 away
2012–13	Internazionale	Round of 16	4–4 (a)	(England) Tottenham Hotspur	4–1 at home (a.e.t.), 0–3 away
2012–13	Napoli	Round of 32	0–5	(Czech Republic) Viktoria Plzeň	0–3 at home, 0–2 away
2012–13	Udinese	4th in Group stage	N/A	(England) Liverpool, (Russia) Anzhi Makhachkala, (Switzerland) Young Boys	
2013–14	Juventus	Semi-finals	1–2	(Portugal) Benfica	0–0 at home, 1–2 away
2013–14	Napoli	Round of 16	2–3	(Portugal) Porto	2–2 at home, 0–1 away
2013–14	Fiorentina	Round of 16	1–2	(Italy) Juventus	0–1 at home, 1–1 away
2013–14	Lazio	Round of 32	3–4	(Bulgaria) Ludogorets Razgrad	0–1 at home, 3–3 away
2013–14	Udinese	Play-off round	2–4	(Czech Republic) Slovan Liberec	1–3 at home, 1–1 away
2014–15	Fiorentina	Semi-finals	0–5	**(Spain) Sevilla**	0–2 at home, 0–3 away
2014–15	Napoli	Semi-finals	1–2	(Ukraine) Dnipro Dnipropetrovsk	1–1 at home, 0–1 away
2014–15	Torino	Round of 16	1–2	(Russia) Zenit Saint Petersburg	1–0 at home, 0–2 away
2014–15	Roma	Round of 16	1–4	(Italy) Fiorentina	0–3 at home, 1–1 away
2014–15	Internazionale	Round of 16	2–5	(Germany) VfL Wolfsburg	1–2 at home, 1–3 away
2015–16	Lazio	Round of 16	1–4	(Czech Republic) Sparta Prague	0–3 at home, 1–1 away
2015–16	Fiorentina	Round of 32	1–4	(England) Tottenham Hotspur	1–1 at home, 0–3 away
2015–16	Napoli	Round of 32	1–2	(Spain) Villarreal	1–1 at home, 0–1 away
2015–16	Sampdoria	Third qualifying round	2–4	(Serbia) Vojvodina	0–4 at home, 2–0 away
2016–17	Roma	Round of 16	4–5	(France) Lyon	2–1 at home, 2–4 away
2016–17	Fiorentina	Round of 32	3–4	(Germany) Borussia Mönchengladbach	2–4 at home, 1–0 away
2016–17	Sassuolo	4th in Group stage	N/A	(Belgium) Genk, (Spain) Athletic Bilbao, (Austria) Rapid Wien	
2016–17	Internazionale	4th in Group stage	N/A	(Czech Republic) Sparta Prague, (England) Southampton, (Israel) Hapoel Be'er Sheva	
2017–18	Lazio	Quarter-finals	5–6	(Austria) Red Bull Salzburg	4–2 at home, 1–4 away
2017–18	Milan	Round of 16	1–5	(England) Arsenal	0–2 at home, 1–3 away
2017–18	Atalanta	Round of 32	3–4	(Germany) Borussia Dortmund	1–1 at home, 2–3 away
2017–18	Napoli	Round of 32	3–3 (a)	(Germany) RB Leipzig	1–3 at home, 2–0 away
2018–19	Napoli	Quarter-finals	0–3	(England) Arsenal	0–1 at home, 0–2 away
2018–19	Internazionale	Round of 16	0–1	(Germany) Eintracht Frankfurt	0–1 at home, 0–0 away
2018–19	Lazio	Round of 32	0–3	(Spain) Sevilla	0–1 at home, 0–2 away
2018–19	Milan	3rd in Group stage	N/A	(Spain) Real Betis, (Greece) Olympiacos, (Luxembourg) F91 Dudelange	
2018–19	Atalanta	Play-off round	0–0 (3–4 p)	(Denmark) Copenhagen	0–0 at home, 0–0 away (a.e.t.)
2019–20	Internazionale	Final	N/A	(Spain) **Sevilla**	2–3
2019–20	Roma	Round of 16	N/A	(Spain) **Sevilla**	0–2
2019–20	Lazio	3rd in Group stage	N/A	(Scotland) Celtic, (Romania) CFR Cluj, (France) Rennes	
2019–20	Torino	Play-off round	3–5	(England) Wolverhampton Wanderers	2–3 at home, 1–2 away
2020–21	Roma	Semi-finals	5–8	(England) Manchester United	3–2 at home, 2–6 away
2020–21	Milan	Round of 16	1–2	(England) Manchester United	0–1 at home, 1–1 away
2020–21	Napoli	Round of 32	2–3	(Spain) Granada	2–1 at home, 0–2 away
2021–22	Atalanta	Quarter-finals	1–3	(Germany) RB Leipzig	0–2 at home, 1–1 away
2021–22	Lazio	Knockout round play-offs	3–4	(Portugal) Porto	2–2 at home, 1–2 away
2021–22	Napoli	Knockout round play-offs	3–5	(Spain) Barcelona	2–4 at home, 1–1 away
2022–23	Roma	Final	N/A	(Spain) **Sevilla**	1–1 (a.e.t.) (1–4 p)
2022–23	Juventus	Semi-finals	2–3	(Spain) **Sevilla**	1–1 at home, 1–2 away (a.e.t.)
2022–23	Lazio	3rd in Group stage	N/A	(Netherlands) Feyenoord, (Denmark) Midtjylland, (Austria) Sturm Graz	
2023–24	**Atalanta**	**Winners**	N/A	(Germany) Bayer Leverkusen	3–0
2023–24	Roma	Semi-finals	2–4	(Germany) Bayer Leverkusen	0–2 at home, 2–2 away
2023–24	Milan	Quarter-finals	1–3	(Italy) Roma	0–1 at home, 1–2 away
2024–25	Lazio	Quarter-finals	3–3 (2–3 p)	(Norway) Bodø/Glimt	3–1 at home (a.e.t.), 0–2 away
2024–25	Roma	Round of 16	3–4	(Spain) Athletic Bilbao	2–1 at home, 1–3 away
2025–26	Bologna	Quarter-finals	1–7	(England) **Aston Villa**	1–3 at home, 0–4 away
2025–26	Roma	Round of 16	4–5	(Italy) Bologna	3–4 at home (a.e.t.), 1–1 away
2026–27	Milan				
2026–27	Juventus				

==== UEFA Conference League ====
The competition was named UEFA Europa Conference League until 2023–24, after which it switched its name to UEFA Conference League.

Season	Team	Progress	Aggregate	Opponents	Results
2021–22	**Roma**	**Winners**	N/A	(Netherlands) Feyenoord	1–0
2022–23	Fiorentina	Final	N/A	(England) **West Ham United**	1–2
2022–23	Lazio	Round of 16	2–4	(Netherlands) AZ	1–2 at home, 1–2 away
2023–24	Fiorentina	Final	N/A	(Greece) **Olympiacos**	0–1 (a.e.t.)
2024–25	Fiorentina	Semi-finals	3–4	(Spain) Real Betis	2–2 at home (a.e.t.), 1–2 away
2025–26	Fiorentina	Quarter-finals	2–4	(England) Crystal Palace	2–1 at home, 0–3 away
2026–27	Atalanta				

==== European/UEFA Super Cup ====
Season	Team	Progress	Aggregate	Opponents	Results
1973	Milan	Runners-up	1–6	(Netherlands) **Ajax**	1–0 at home, 0–6 away
1984	**Juventus**	**Winners**	N/A	(England) Liverpool	2–0
1989	**Milan**	**Winners**	2–1	(Spain) Barcelona	1–0 at home, 1–1 away
1990	**Milan**	**Winners**	3–1	(Italy) Sampdoria	2–0 at home, 1–1 away
1990	Sampdoria	Runners-up	1–3	(Italy) **Milan**	1–1 at home, 0–2 away
1993	**Parma**	**Winners**	2–1	(Italy) Milan	0–1 at home, 2–0 away (a.e.t.)
1993	Milan	Runners-up	1–2	(Italy) **Parma**	0–2 at home (a.e.t.), 1–0 away
1994	**Milan**	**Winners**	2–0	(England) Arsenal	2–0 at home, 0–0 away
1996	**Juventus**	**Winners**	9–2	(France) Paris Saint-Germain	3–1 at home, 6–1 away
1999	**Lazio**	**Winners**	N/A	(England) Manchester United	1–0
2003	**Milan**	**Winners**	N/A	(Portugal) Porto	1–0
2007	**Milan**	**Winners**	N/A	(Spain) Sevilla	3–1
2010	Internazionale	Runners-up	N/A	(Spain) **Atlético Madrid**	0–2
2024	Atalanta	Runners-up	N/A	(Spain) **Real Madrid**	0–2

==== UEFA Cup Winners' Cup ====
Season	Team	Progress	Aggregate	Opponents	Results
1960–61	**Fiorentina**	**Winners**	4–1	(Scotland) Rangers	2–1 at home, 2–0 away
1961–62	Fiorentina	Final	N/A	**(Spain) Atlético Madrid**	1–1, 0–3 (replay)
1962–63	Napoli	Quarter-finals	1–3	(Socialist Federal Republic of Yugoslavia) OFK Beograd	3–1 at home, 0–2 away, 1–3 away (play-off)
1963–64	Atalanta	First round	1–3	**(Portugal) Sporting CP**	2–0 at home, 1–3 away, 1–3 away (a.e.t.) (play-off)
1964–65	Torino	Semi-finals	0–2	(West Germany) 1860 Munich	2–0 at home, 1–3 away, 0–2 away (play-off)
1965–66	Juventus	First round	1–2	(England) Liverpool	1–0 at home, 0–2 away
1966–67	Fiorentina	First round	3–4	(Hungary) Győri ETO	1–0 at home, 2–4 away
1967–68	**Milan**	**Winners**	N/A	(West Germany) Hamburger SV	2–0
1968–69	Torino	Quarter-finals	1–3	(Czechoslovakia) **Slovan Bratislava**	0–1 at home, 1–2 away
1969–70	Roma	Semi-finals	1–1 (c)	(Poland) Górnik Zabrze	1–1 at home, 2–2 away
1970–71	Bologna	First round	1–1 (a)	(East Germany) Vorwärts Berlin	0–0 at home, 1–1 away
1971–72	Torino	Quarter-finals	1–2	(Scotland) **Rangers**	1–1 at home, 0–1 away
1972–73	**Milan**	**Winners**	N/A	(England) Leeds United	1–0
1973–74	Milan	Final	N/A	**(East Germany) 1. FC Magdeburg**	0–2
1974–75	Bologna	First round	2–4	(Poland) Gwardia Warszawa	1–2 at home, 1–2 away
1975–76	Fiorentina	Second round	1–1 (5–6 p)	(East Germany) BSG Sachsenring Zwickau	1–0 at home, 0–1 away
1976–77	Napoli	Semi-finals	1–2	(Belgium) Anderlecht	1–0 at home, 0–2 away
1977–78	Milan	First round	2–3	(Spain) Real Betis	2–1 at home, 0–2 away
1978–79	Internazionale	Quarter-finals	0–1	(Belgium) Beveren	0–0 at home, 0–1 away
1979–80	Juventus	Semi-finals	1–2	(England) Arsenal	0–1 at home, 1–1 away
1980–81	Roma	First round	3–4	(East Germany) Carl Zeiss Jena	3–0 at home, 0–4 away
1981–82	Roma	Second round	0–2	(Portugal) Porto	0–0 at home, 0–2 away
1982–83	Internazionale	Quarter-finals	2–3	(Spain) Real Madrid	1–1 at home, 1–2 away
1983–84	**Juventus**	**Winners**	N/A	(Portugal) Porto	2–1
1984–85	Roma	Quarter-finals	1–4	(West Germany) Bayern Munich	1–2 at home, 0–2 away
1985–86	Sampdoria	Second round	1–2	(Portugal) Benfica	1–0 at home, 0–2 away
1986–87	Roma	First round	2–2 (3–4 p)	(Spain) Zaragoza	2–0 at home, 0–2 away (a.e.t.)
1987–88	Atalanta	Semi-finals	2–4	(Belgium) **KV Mechelen**	1–2 at home, 1–2 away
1988–89	Sampdoria	Final	N/A	**(Spain) Barcelona**	0–2
1989–90	**Sampdoria**	**Winners**	N/A	(Belgium) Anderlecht	2–0 (a.e.t.)
1990–91	Juventus	Semi-finals	2–3	(Spain) Barcelona	1–0 at home, 1–3 away
1990–91	Sampdoria	Quarter-finals	2–3	(Poland) Legia Warsaw	2–2 at home, 0–1 away
1991–92	Roma	Quarter-finals	0–1	(France) Monaco	0–0 at home, 0–1 away
1992–93	**Parma**	**Winners**	N/A	(Belgium) Royal Antwerp	3–1
1993–94	Parma	Final	N/A	**(England) Arsenal**	0–1
1993–94	Torino	Quarter-finals	0–1	**(England) Arsenal**	0–0 at home, 0–1 away
1994–95	Sampdoria	Semi-finals	5–5 (3–2 p)	(England) Arsenal	3–2 at home (a.e.t.), 2–3 away
1995–96	Parma	Quarter-finals	2–3	(France) **Paris Saint-Germain**	1–0 at home, 1–3 away
1996–97	Fiorentina	Semi-finals	1–3	**(Spain) Barcelona**	0–2 at home, 1–1 away
1997–98	Vicenza	Semi-finals	2–3	**(England) Chelsea**	1–0 at home, 1–3 away
1998–99	**Lazio**	**Winners**	N/A	(Spain) Mallorca	2–1

==== Inter-Cities Fairs Cup ====
While the Inter-Cities Fairs Cup (1955–1971) is recognised as the predecessor to the UEFA Cup, it was not organised by UEFA. Consequently, UEFA does not consider clubs' records in the Fairs Cup to be part of their European record.

Season	Team	Progress	Aggregate	Opponents	Results
1955–58	Internazionale	2nd in group stage	N/A	(England) Birmingham City, (Socialist Federal Republic of Yugoslavia) Zagreb XI	
1958–60	Roma	Quarter-finals	1–3	(Belgium) Union Saint-Gilloise	1–1 at home, 0–2 away
1958–60	Internazionale	Quarter-finals	2–8	(Spain) **Barcelona**	2–4 at home, 0–4 away
1960–61	**Roma**	**Winners**	4–2	(England) Birmingham City	2–0 at home, 2–2 away
1960–61	Internazionale	Semi-finals	2–4	(England) Birmingham City	1–2 at home, 1–2 away
1961–62	Roma	Second round	1–4	(England) Sheffield Wednesday	1–0 at home, 0–4 away
1961–62	Internazionale	Quarter-finals	3–5	(Spain) **Valencia**	3–3 at home, 0–2 away
1961–62	Milan	First round	0–2	(Socialist Federal Republic of Yugoslavia) Novi Sad XI	0–0 at home, 0–2 away
1962–63	Roma	Semi-finals	1–3	(Spain) **Valencia**	1–0 at home, 0–3 away
1962–63	Sampdoria	Second round	1–6	(Hungary) Ferencváros	1–0 at home, 0–6 away
1963–64	Roma	Quarter-finals	3–5	(West Germany) 1. FC Köln	3–1 at home, 0–4 away
1963–64	Juventus	Quarter-finals	2–3	(Spain) **Zaragoza**	0–0 at home, 2–3 away
1964–65	Fiorentina	First round	1–2	(Spain) Barcelona	0–2 at home, 1–0 away
1964–65	Milan	First round	1–2	(France) Strasbourg	1–0 at home, 0–2 away
1964–65	Juventus	Final	N/A	(Hungary) **Ferencváros**	0–1
1964–65	Roma	Third round	1–3	(Hungary) Ferencváros	1–2 at home, 0–1 away
1965–66	Roma	First round	1–4	(England) Chelsea	0–0 at home, 1–4 away
1965–66	Milan	Third round	1–1 (c)	(England) Chelsea	2–1 at home, 1–2 away, 1–1 a home (play-off) (a.e.t.)
1965–66	Torino	First round	1–2	(England) Leeds United	0–0 at home, 1–2 away
1965–66	Fiorentina	Second round	2–4	(Czechoslovakia) Zbrojovka Brno	2–0 at home, 0–4 away
1966–67	Napoli	Third round	0–3	(England) Burnley	0–0 at home, 0–3 away
1966–67	Bologna	Quarter-finals	1–1 (c)	(England) Leeds United	1–0 at home, 0–1 away
1966–67	Juventus	Quarter-finals	2–5	(Socialist Federal Republic of Yugoslavia) **Dinamo Zagreb**	2–2 at home, 0–3 away
1967–68	Napoli	Second round	4–6	(Scotland) Hibernian	4–1 at home, 0–5 away
1967–68	Bologna	Semi-finals	4–5	(Hungary) Ferencváros	2–2 at home, 2–3 away
1967–68	Fiorentina	Second round	2–3	(Portugal) Sporting CP	1–1 at home, 1–2 away
1968–69	Napoli	Second round	2–2 (c)	(England) Leeds United	2–0 at home, 0–2 away
1968–69	Bologna	Second round	1–2	(Socialist Federal Republic of Yugoslavia) OFK Beograd	1–1 at home, 0–1 away
1968–69	Juventus	Second round	0–1	(West Germany) Eintracht Frankfurt	0–0 at home, 0–1 away (a.e.t.)
1968–69	Fiorentina	Third round	2–4	(Portugal) Vitória de Setúbal	2–1 at home, 0–3 away
1969–70	Napoli	Third round	1–4	(Netherlands) Ajax	1–0 at home, 0–4 away (a.e.t.)
1969–70	Cagliari	Second round	0–3	(East Germany) Carl Zeiss Jena	0–1 at home, 0–2 away
1969–70	Juventus	Second round	1–3	(West Germany) Hertha BSC	0–0 at home, 1–3 away
1969–70	Internazionale	Semi-finals	1–2	(Belgium) Anderlecht	0–2 at home, 1–0 away
1970–71	Lazio	First round	2–4	(England) Arsenal	2–2 at home, 0–2 away
1970–71	Fiorentina	Second round	1–3	(West Germany) 1. FC Köln	1–2 at home, 0–1 away
1970–71	Juventus	Final	3–3 (a)	**(England) Leeds United**	2–2 at home, 1–1 away
1970–71	Internazionale	First round	1–3	(England) Newcastle United	1–1 at home, 0–2 away

==== UEFA Intertoto Cup ====
Although the tournament was founded in 1961–62, it was only taken over by UEFA in 1995.

Year	Team	Progress	Aggregate	Opponents	Results
1995	No entrants				
1996	No entrants				
1997	No entrants				
1998	Sampdoria	Semi-finals	2–3	(Italy) Bologna	1–0 at home, 1–3 away
1998	**Bologna**	**Winners**	3–0	(Poland) Ruch Chorzów	1–0 at home, 2–0 away
1999	Perugia	Third round	2–4	(Turkey) Trabzonspor	0–3 at home, (Note: The game was abandoned in the 114th minute of extra time due to some objects being thrown on the pitch, some even hitting the referee. UEFA banned Perugia and awarded a 3–0 win to Trabzonspor.) 2–1 away
1999	**Juventus**	**Winners**	4–2	(France) Rennes	2–0 at home, 2–2 away
2000	Perugia	Third round	2–3	(Belgium) Standard Liège	1–2 at home, 1–1 away
2000	**Udinese**	**Winners**	6–4	(Czech Republic) Sigma Olomouc	4–2 at home (a.e.t.), 2–2 away
2001	Brescia	Final	1–1 (a)	(France) **Paris Saint-Germain**	1–1 at home, 0–0 away
2002	Perugia	Third round	3–4	(Germany) VfB Stuttgart	2–1 at home, 1–3 away
2002	Bologna	Final	3–5	(England) **Fulham**	2–2 at home, 1–3 away
2002	Torino	Third round	2–2 (3–4 p)	(Spain) Villarreal	2–0 at home, 0–2 away (a.e.t.)
2003	**Perugia**	**Winners**	3–0	(Germany) VfL Wolfsburg	1–0 at home, 2–0 away
2003	Brescia	Third round	1–3	(Spain) Villarreal	1–1 at home, 0–2 away
2004	No entrants				
2005	Lazio	Semi-finals	1–4	(France) Marseille	1–1 at home, 0–3 away
2006	No entrants (Note: After consultations with UEFA, Palermo, which had originally qualified to the 2006 UEFA Intertoto Cup, were withdrawn by the Italian Football Federation (FIGC) on 6 June 2006. Due to the ongoing match-fixing scandal in Italy, the FIGC could not officially confirm the 2005–06 Serie A standings in time for Palermo to compete in the Intertoto Cup and therefore French club Auxerre replaced Palermo, according to UEFA regulations governing the Intertoto Cup. According to the final standings, Palermo qualified for the UEFA Cup.)				
2007	Sampdoria	Won in third round	2–0	(Bulgaria) Cherno More Varna	1–0 at home, 1–0 away
2008	Napoli	Won in third round	2–0	(Greece) Panionios	1–0 at home, 1–0 away

=== Worldwide competitions ===
==== Intercontinental Cup ====
Season	Team	Progress	Aggregate	Opponents	Results
1963	Milan	Runners-up	6–7	(Brazil) Santos	4–2 at home, 2–4 away, 0–1 play-off
1964	**Internazionale**	**Winners**	3–1	(Argentina) Independiente	2–0 at home, 0–1 away, 1–0 play-off
1965	**Internazionale**	**Winners**	3–0	(Argentina) Independiente	3–0 at home, 0–0 away
1969	**Milan**	**Winners**	4–2	(Argentina) Estudiantes de La Plata	3–0 at home, 1–2 away
1973	Juventus	Runners-up	N/A	(Argentina) Independiente	0–1
1985	**Juventus**	**Winners**	N/A	(Argentina) Argentinos Juniors	2–2 (a.e.t.) (4–2 p)
1989	**Milan**	**Winners**	N/A	(Colombia) Atlético Nacional	1–0
1990	**Milan**	**Winners**	N/A	(Paraguay) Club Olimpia	3–0
1993	Milan	Runners-up	N/A	(Brazil) São Paulo	2–3
1994	Milan	Runners-up	N/A	(Argentina) Vélez Sarsfield	0–2
1996	**Juventus**	**Winners**	N/A	(Argentina) River Plate	1–0
2003	Milan	Runners-up	N/A	(Argentina) Boca Juniors	1–1 (a.e.t.) (1–3 p)

==== FIFA Club World Cup ====
Season	Team	Progress	Opponents	Result
2007	**Milan**	**Winners**	(Argentina) Boca Juniors	4–2
2010	**Internazionale**	**Winners**	(Democratic Republic of the Congo) TP Mazembe	3–0
2025	Internazionale	Round of 16	(Brazil) Fluminense	0–2
2025	Juventus	Round of 16	(Spain) Real Madrid	0–1

== Qualification to European competitions ==
Seven teams from Italy qualify for European competitions.

The Serie A winners and clubs finishing 2nd, 3rd and 4th qualify to the UEFA Champions League league phase, while two other teams (one being the Coppa Italia winners) qualify to the UEFA Europa League. The club finishing 6th qualifies for the play-off round of the UEFA Conference League. If the Coppa Italia winner already qualified for the UEFA Champions League or Europa League, then the club finishing 6th qualifies for the Europa League league phase and the 7th qualifies for the play-off round of the Conference League. During the 2024–25 season, Italy had five teams qualify for the Champions League, those who finished 1st to 5th in the Serie A standings, based on the new extra-spot rule, given to the two leagues who teams earn the most points in Europe by UEFA.

== UEFA coefficient records ==
- Record-high ranking: 1st from 1986 to 1989 and from 1991 to 1999
- Record-low ranking: 12th in 1982

== Participation of Italian clubs in European competitions ==
The following table shows the number of seasons in which Italian clubs took part in the three European seasonal cups (including the Inter-Cities Fairs Cup).

- UCL = UEFA Champions League (European Cup)
- CWC = UEFA Cup Winners' Cup
- UEL = UEFA Europa League (UEFA Cup)
- UECL = UEFA Conference League

It includes competitions in which Italian clubs have taken part in the season kick-off, namely in September, when the UEFA Champions League, Europa League, and Conference League group stages usually start. It does not include qualifying rounds held during the summer. Azure denotes clubs that experienced a Champions League group phase, pink a Europa League group phase, and green a Conference League group phase.

When two or more clubs have the same number of participations, they are sorted by the number of seasons in the most important competition.

Nº	Club	UCL	CWC	UEL	UECL	Seasons	First participation	Last participation
1	Juventus	39	4	19 (Note: The 2009–10, 2013–14, and 2022–23 UEFA Europa League knockout phases after the 2009–10, 2013–14, and 2022–23 UEFA Champions League group stage eliminations are not included.)	–	62	1958–59 European Cup	2026–27 UEFA Europa League
2	Internazionale	27 (Note: The 2000–01 UEFA Champions League qualifying rounds elimination with consequent 2000–01 UEFA Cup qualification is not included.)	2	31 (Note: The 2003–04, 2018–19, and 2019–20 UEFA Europa League knockout phases after the 2003–04, 2018–19, 2019–20 UEFA Champions League group stage eliminations are not included.)	–	60 (Note: In the first two editions of the Inter-Cities Fairs Cup, Internazionale played four matches over two seasons. In the first edition (1955–1958), Inter played two matches in the 1955–56 season and the same number in the 1956–57 season. In the second edition (1958–1960), Internazionale played three matches in the 1958–59 season and one in the 1959–60 season. In consideration of this statistical detail, the actual count of seasons in which Internazionale played at least one match in European cups rises to 62.)	1955–1958 Inter-Cities Fairs Cup	2026–27 UEFA Champions League
3	Milan	32	4	16 (Note: The 2023–24 UEFA Europa League knockout phase after the 2023–24 UEFA Champions League group stage elimination is not included.)	–	52	1955–56 European Cup	2026–27 UEFA Europa League
4	Roma	13 (Note: The 2016–17 UEFA Champions League play-off round elimination with consequent 2016–17 UEFA Europa League qualification is not included.)	6	27 (Note: The 2014–15 UEFA Europa League knockout phase after the UEFA Champions League group stage elimination is not included. The 2011–12 UEFA Europa League play-off round elimination is also not included.)	1	47	1958–60 Inter-Cities Fairs Cup	2026–27 UEFA Champions League
5	Napoli	12 (Note: The 2014–15 UEFA Champions League play-off round elimination with consequent 2014–15 UEFA Europa League qualification is not included.)	2	23 (Note: The 2013–14, 2017–18, and 2018–19 UEFA Europa League knockout phases after the 2013–14, 2017–18, and 2018–19 UEFA Champions League group stage eliminations are not included.)	–	37	1962–63 European Cup Winners' Cup	2026–27 UEFA Champions League
6	Fiorentina	5	5	20 (Note: The 2008–09 UEFA Cup knockout stage after the 2008–09 UEFA Champions League group stage elimination is not included.)	4	34	1956–57 European Cup	2025–26 UEFA Conference League
7	Lazio	7 (Note: The 2015–16 UEFA Champions League play-off round elimination with consequent 2015–16 UEFA Europa League qualification is not included.)	1	22	– (Note: The 2022–23 UEFA Europa Conference League knockout phase after the 2022–23 UEFA Europa League group stage elimination is not included.)	30	1970–71 Inter-Cities Fairs Cup	2024–25 UEFA Europa League
8	Torino	1	4	13 (Note: The 2019–20 UEFA Europa League play-off round elimination is not included.)	–	18	1964–65 European Cup Winners' Cup	2014–15 UEFA Europa League
9	Parma	1 (Note: The 1999–2000 and 2001–02 UEFA Champions League qualifying rounds eliminations with consequent 1999–2000 and 2001–02 UEFA Cup qualifications are not included.)	3	11	–	15	1991–92 UEFA Cup	2006–07 UEFA Cup
10	Atalanta	5	2	4 (Note: The 2018–19 UEFA Europa League play-off round elimination is not included. The 2021–22 UEFA Europa League knockout phase after the 2021–22 UEFA Champions League group stage elimination is also not included.)	1	12	1963–64 European Cup Winners' Cup	2026–27 UEFA Conference League
11	Bologna	2	2	8	–	12	1964–65 European Cup	2025–26 UEFA Europa League
12	Sampdoria	1 (Note: The 2010–11 UEFA Champions League play-off round elimination with consequent 2010–11 UEFA Europa League qualification is not included.)	5	6 (Note: The 2015–16 UEFA Europa League third qualifying round elimination is not included.)	–	12	1962–63 Inter-Cities Fairs Cup	2010–11 UEFA Europa League
13	Udinese	1 (Note: The 2011–12 and 2012–13 UEFA Champions League play-off round eliminations with consequent 2011–12 and 2012–13 UEFA Europa League qualifications are not included.)	–	9 (Note: The 2005–06 UEFA Cup knockout stage after the 2005–06 UEFA Champions League group stage elimination is not included. The 2013–14 UEFA Europa League play-off round elimination is also not included.)	–	10	1997–98 UEFA Cup	2012–13 UEFA Europa League
14	Cagliari	1	–	3	–	4	1969–70 Inter-Cities Fairs Cup	1993–94 UEFA Cup
15	Palermo	–	–	4 (Note: The 2011–12 UEFA Europa League third qualifying round elimination is not included.)	–	4	2005–06 UEFA Cup	2010–11 UEFA Europa League
16	Hellas Verona	1	–	2	–	3	1983–84 UEFA Cup	1987–88 UEFA Cup
17	Vicenza	–	1	1	–	2	1978–79 UEFA Cup	1997–98 UEFA Cup Winners' Cup
18	Perugia	–	–	2	–	2	1979–80 UEFA Cup	2003–04 UEFA Cup
19	ChievoVerona	– (Note: The 2006–07 UEFA Champions League third qualifying round elimination with consequent 2006–07 UEFA Cup qualification is not included.)	–	2	–	2	2002–03 UEFA Cup	2006–07 UEFA Cup
20	Genoa	–	–	2	–	2	1991–92 UEFA Cup	2009–10 UEFA Europa League
21	Como	1	–	–	–	1	2026–27 UEFA Champions League	2026–27 UEFA Champions League
22	Cesena	–	–	1	–	1	1976–77 UEFA Cup	1976–77 UEFA Cup
23	Livorno	–	–	1	–	1	2006–07 UEFA Cup	2006–07 UEFA Cup
24	Empoli	–	–	1	–	1	2007–08 UEFA Cup	2007–08 UEFA Cup
25	Sassuolo	–	–	1	–	1	2016–17 UEFA Europa League	2016–17 UEFA Europa League

== Consecutive seasons in European competitions ==
Teams in bold: active streak. Only the best result of each teams is shown

Rank	Club	Consecutive seasons	Years
1	Juventus	28	1963–64 to 1990–91
2	Internazionale	16	1976–77 to 1991–92
3	Milan	15	1999–2000 to 2013–14
4	Parma	14	1991–92 to 2004–05
4	Napoli	14	2010–11 to 2023–24
6	Roma	**13**	1998–99 to 2010–11; 2014–15 to 2026–27
7	Lazio	12	1993–94 to 2004–05
8	Fiorentina	7	1964–65 to 1970–71
9	Torino	5	1976–77 to 1980–81
10	Atalanta	4	2023–24 to 2026–27
10	Sampdoria	4	1988–89 to 1991–92
10	Udinese	4	1997–98 to 2000–01
13	Bologna	3	1966–67 to 1968–69
13	Palermo	3	2005–06 to 2007–08

== Head-to-head against other European clubs ==
=== By country ===
Key

Positive balance (more wins than losses)
Neutral balance (as many wins as losses)
Negative balance (more losses than wins)

As of 5 November 2026

Country	Played	Won	Drew	Lost	GF	GA	GD	Win%
Albania	6	5	0	1	15	2	+13	83.33
Austria	109	65	26	18	223	104	+119	59.63
Azerbaijan	9	7	2	0	19	6	+13	77.78
Belarus	16	7	7	2	29	10	+19	43.75
Belgium	125	59	35	31	179	116	+63	47.20
Bosnia and Herzegovina	6	3	3	0	20	5	+15	50.00
Bulgaria	63	37	15	11	116	50	+66	58.73
Croatia	52	29	14	9	77	41	+36	55.77
Cyprus	30	22	6	2	77	24	+53	73.33
Czech Republic	93	50	25	18	150	82	+68	53.76
Denmark	48	30	14	4	98	38	+60	62.50
England	302	104	71	127	347	399	−52	34.44
Finland	22	18	2	2	46	9	+37	81.82
France	214	100	57	57	313	215	+98	46.73
Georgia	6	1	2	3	3	6	−3	16.67
Germany	349	148	78	123	507	461	+46	42.41
Greece	113	57	33	23	184	98	+86	50.44
Hungary	53	25	17	11	90	60	+30	47.17
Iceland	6	6	0	0	28	1	+27	100.00
Republic of Ireland	7	6	1	0	13	0	+13	85.71
Israel	23	12	5	6	31	20	+11	52.17
Kazakhstan	2	1	1	0	3	2	+1	50.00
Latvia	6	5	1	0	14	2	+12	83.33
Lithuania	2	2	0	0	7	1	+6	100.00
Luxembourg	14	14	0	0	58	4	+54	100.00
Macedonia	10	8	2	0	28	2	+26	80.00
Malta	8	8	0	0	33	2	+31	100.00
Moldova	4	4	0	0	11	3	+8	100.00
Netherlands	164	68	47	49	222	182	+40	41.46
Northern Ireland	6	5	1	0	15	1	+14	83.33
Norway	45	29	8	8	85	44	+41	64.44
Poland	75	48	17	10	153	69	+84	64.00
Portugal	188	92	49	47	250	175	+75	48.94
Romania	81	45	24	12	128	51	+77	55.56
Russia	86	46	23	17	125	79	+46	53.49
Scotland	87	50	18	19	160	79	+81	57.47
Serbia	62	33	19	10	96	59	+37	53.23
Slovakia	26	16	3	7	53	21	+32	61.54
Slovenia	16	13	2	1	48	11	+37	81.25
Spain	379	120	85	174	397	568	−171	31.66
Sweden	67	43	12	12	118	43	+75	64.18
Switzerland	87	49	18	20	103	54	+49	56.32
Turkey	95	53	21	21	171	93	+78	55.79
Ukraine	90	56	19	15	164	66	+98	62.22
Wales	10	7	1	2	14	9	+5	70.00

=== By club ===
Key

Positive balance (more wins than losses)
Neutral balance (as many wins as losses)
Negative balance (more losses than wins)

As of 5 November 2026

Club	Country	Pld	W	D	L	GF	GA
Real Madrid	Spain	88	27	11	50	107	149
Barcelona	Spain	77	18	24	35	89	135
Ajax	Netherlands	56	23	18	15	69	62
Bayern Munich	Germany	51	17	10	24	62	91
Manchester United	England	45	16	7	22	58	69
Borussia Dortmund	Germany	44	22	8	14	72	57
Liverpool	England	44	18	6	20	52	57
Porto	Portugal	44	18	13	13	49	48
Benfica	Portugal	42	20	8	14	55	47
Atlético Madrid	Spain	41	15	6	20	40	54
Arsenal	England	41	9	10	22	31	53
Sporting CP	Portugal	40	17	17	6	51	36
Shakhtar Donetsk	Ukraine	35	22	6	7	69	21
Anderlecht	Belgium	34	16	10	8	48	33
Sparta Prague	Czech Republic	34	18	11	5	51	26
Celtic	Scotland	34	17	10	7	51	30
Chelsea	England	31	11	8	12	39	48
Werder Bremen	Germany	30	8	11	11	42	49
Valencia	Spain	30	15	6	9	47	36
Bayer Leverkusen	Germany	30	15	7	8	47	34
Dinamo Zagreb	Croatia	30	17	7	6	49	26
PSV Eindhoven	Netherlands	30	13	6	11	39	39
Olympiacos	Greece	29	16	5	8	50	27
Red Star Belgrade	Serbia	29	16	10	3	46	22
Dynamo Kyiv	Ukraine	29	19	8	2	51	21
Feyenoord	Netherlands	29	12	7	10	51	32
Lyon	France	28	12	7	9	42	31
Galatasaray	Turkey	28	9	10	9	43	39
Club Brugge	Belgium	28	13	7	8	35	28
Paris Saint-Germain	France	27	10	9	8	33	36
Marseille	France	27	12	8	7	38	26
Rangers	Scotland	26	15	5	6	44	20
Villarreal	Spain	26	7	8	11	30	36
Red Bull Salzburg	Austria	26	16	4	6	51	23
Rapid Wien	Austria	25	17	5	3	63	24
Panathinaikos	Greece	25	11	7	7	41	30
Athletic Bilbao	Spain	23	7	5	11	37	40
Tottenham Hotspur	England	22	7	9	6	26	26
CSKA Sofia	Bulgaria	21	13	5	3	37	16
1. FC Köln	Germany	20	11	3	6	33	24
Borussia Mönchengladbach	Germany	20	5	9	6	28	28
Manchester City	England	20	5	7	8	20	29
AEK Athens	Greece	20	9	8	3	29	15
Slavia Prague	Czech Republic	19	11	4	4	28	15
Boavista	Portugal	18	9	5	4	24	10
CSKA Moscow	Russia	18	10	3	5	30	24
Grasshopper	Switzerland	18	11	1	6	36	23
Trabzonspor	Turkey	18	10	5	3	27	14
Legia Warsaw	Poland	18	11	5	2	31	13
Monaco	France	18	10	4	4	28	12
Leeds United	England	17	4	7	6	13	15
Spartak Moscow	Russia	17	8	5	4	21	16
Sevilla	Spain	17	5	4	8	15	19
Bodø/Glimt	Norway	17	10	1	6	37	29
Bordeaux	France	16	8	4	4	29	14
Rosenborg	Norway	16	11	4	1	33	11
Dinamo București	Romania	16	7	6	3	29	16
Eintracht Frankfurt	Germany	16	6	4	6	18	12
VfB Stuttgart	Germany	16	9	4	3	23	13
Fenerbahçe	Turkey	16	10	2	4	26	13
Steaua București	Romania	15	9	5	1	21	5
Partizan	Serbia	15	10	4	1	31	14
Lokomotiv Moscow	Russia	15	10	4	1	20	8
Basel	Switzerland	15	8	2	5	32	22
Sturm Graz	Austria	15	8	6	1	26	13
Braga	Portugal	15	9	2	4	24	12
Lille	France	15	4	3	8	10	21
Austria Wien	Austria	14	8	5	1	32	11
Levski Sofia	Bulgaria	14	6	5	3	28	14
PAOK	Greece	14	7	5	2	20	12
Deportivo La Coruña	Spain	14	4	5	5	17	17
Zenit Saint Petersburg	Russia	14	8	3	3	21	12
Nantes	France	14	6	5	3	24	14
Viktoria Plzeň	Czech Republic	14	7	4	3	26	13
Ferencváros	Hungary	14	4	4	6	20	23
Standard Liège	Belgium	13	3	5	5	14	16
Hertha BSC	Germany	13	5	4	4	16	12
Beşiktaş	Turkey	13	9	3	1	27	10
Hamburger SV	Germany	12	6	2	4	18	12
Schalke 04	Germany	12	4	2	6	13	21
Aris Thessaloniki	Greece	12	6	5	1	23	7
Vitória de Setúbal	Portugal	12	7	1	4	19	11
IFK Norrköping	Sweden	12	6	3	3	19	10
Zürich	Switzerland	12	7	3	2	17	11
Dnipro Dnipropetrovsk	Ukraine	12	7	3	2	19	13
Malmö FF	Sweden	12	7	3	2	19	8
Young Boys	Switzerland	12	7	1	4	26	16
Slovan Bratislava	Slovakia	12	7	1	4	22	9
Újpest	Hungary	11	6	5	0	17	6
Aston Villa	England	11	4	1	6	10	15
Newcastle United	England	11	4	4	3	12	9
Real Sociedad	Spain	11	5	5	1	15	7
Copenhagen	Denmark	11	6	4	1	23	7
Lens	France	11	6	1	4	22	15
BATE Borisov	Belarus	10	4	5	1	15	6
Hajduk Split	Croatia	10	4	4	2	11	9
Strasbourg	France	10	5	2	3	11	9
Widzew Łódź	Poland	10	7	1	2	23	9
IFK Göteborg	Sweden	10	6	2	2	18	7
CFR Cluj	Romania	10	7	2	1	20	5
Real Betis	Spain	10	3	3	4	13	15
AZ	Netherlands	10	3	1	6	9	11
Auxerre	France	9	7	1	1	14	5
1. FC Magdeburg	Germany	9	6	0	3	12	9
Maccabi Haifa	Israel	9	8	2	2	12	9
Twente	Netherlands	9	4	3	2	12	9
Ludogorets Razgrad	Bulgaria	9	5	2	2	15	8
Union Saint-Gilloise	Belgium	9	4	3	2	12	6
Rennes	France	9	4	3	2	15	11
Tirol Innsbruck	Austria	8	3	3	2	13	10
Mechelen	Belgium	8	4	1	3	13	7
Apollon Limassol	Cyprus	8	4	3	1	12	9
Ipswich Town	England	8	4	0	4	16	13
Everton	England	8	5	2	1	12	3
Győr	Hungary	8	3	3	2	14	10
Wisła Kraków	Poland	8	4	2	2	13	12
Universitatea Craiova	Romania	8	4	2	2	8	5
OFK Beograd	Serbia	8	3	1	4	9	11
Maribor	Slovenia	8	6	1	1	21	6
Vitesse	Netherlands	8	3	4	1	9	6
Lech Poznań	Poland	8	3	3	2	17	13
Genk	Belgium	8	3	3	2	10	8
Nice	France	8	8	0	0	19	3
Lokomotiv Plovdiv	Bulgaria	7	5	2	0	13	5
Brøndby	Denmark	7	4	2	1	13	5
VfL Wolfsburg	Germany	7	3	2	2	13	10
Hibernian	Scotland	7	4	2	1	23	13
Espanyol	Spain	7	0	3	4	3	9
Qarabağ	Azerbaijan	7	6	1	0	14	3
Midtjylland	Denmark	7	5	1	1	19	9
RB Leipzig	Germany	7	4	1	2	12	9
Lausanne	Switzerland	7	4	2	1	9	4
Celta Vigo	Spain	7	3	2	2	7	9
Admira Wacker Mödling	Austria	6	4	0	2	10	7
Omonia	Cyprus	6	6	0	0	22	3
Anorthosis Famagusta	Cyprus	6	5	1	0	20	5
Slovan Liberec	Czech Republic	6	3	1	2	10	7
AaB	Denmark	6	3	2	1	8	5
Birmingham City	England	6	1	2	3	7	8
Fulham	England	6	2	2	2	10	12
HJK	Finland	6	5	0	1	11	2
Saint-Étienne	France	6	2	3	1	8	5
Dinamo Tbilisi	Georgia	6	1	2	3	3	6
Carl Zeiss Jena	Germany	6	2	1	3	7	9
Lokomotive Leipzig	Germany	6	2	1	3	8	8
Hannover 96	Germany	6	4	2	0	23	6
Panionios	Greece	6	5	0	1	11	3
Utrecht	Netherlands	6	2	4	0	9	6
Ruch Chorzów	Poland	6	5	1	0	13	2
Rapid București	Romania	6	4	1	1	7	3
Dynamo Moscow	Russia	6	3	2	1	10	4
Rubin Kazan	Russia	6	3	2	1	7	6
Dundee	Scotland	6	4	0	2	11	5
Zaragoza	Spain	6	2	1	3	9	9
AIK	Sweden	6	5	1	0	12	1
Debrecen	Hungary	6	5	0	1	17	8
Rijeka	Croatia	6	4	1	1	9	5
Heart of Midlothian	Scotland	6	5	0	1	17	4
IF Elfsborg	Sweden	6	4	0	2	12	3
Hapoel Tel Aviv	Israel	6	2	2	2	4	3
Odense	Denmark	5	3	2	0	7	3
1860 Munich	Germany	5	2	1	2	7	7
Górnik Zabrze	Poland	5	2	3	0	9	6
APOEL	Cyprus	5	2	2	1	8	4
Vitória de Guimarães	Portugal	5	3	1	1	9	5
Sigma Olomouc	Czech Republic	5	4	1	0	15	5
SK Brann	Norway	5	4	1	0	5	0
Wiener Sport-Club	Austria	4	3	0	1	8	10
Beveren	Belgium	4	2	1	1	3	2
Standard Liège	Belgium	4	4	0	0	8	1
Gent	Belgium	4	3	1	0	12	3
Dinamo Minsk	Belarus	4	2	1	1	8	3
Dukla Prague	Czech Republic	4	1	2	1	2	2
Wolverhampton Wanderers	England	4	0	1	3	5	8
Ilves	Finland	4	3	1	0	12	4
Haka	Finland	4	4	0	0	8	0
Sochaux	France	4	0	4	0	3	3
Guingamp	France	4	3	1	0	9	2
Hansa Rostock	Germany	4	2	0	2	8	6
Vorwärts Berlin	Germany	4	1	2	1	5	3
Dynamo Dresden	Germany	4	1	0	3	3	8
1. FC Kaiserslautern	Germany	4	1	0	3	3	5
Budapest Honvéd	Hungary	4	1	1	2	5	5
Skonto	Latvia	4	4	0	0	10	1
FK Pobeda	Macedonia	4	3	1	0	7	0
Valletta	Malta	4	4	0	0	14	1
Roda JC Kerkrade	Netherlands	4	3	0	1	10	2
Groningen	Netherlands	4	1	2	1	7	5
Zagłębie Lubin	Poland	4	4	0	0	10	1
Belenenses	Portugal	4	4	0	0	8	1
Gloria Bistrița	Romania	4	2	2	0	5	3
Sportul	Romania	4	3	0	1	6	2
Vaslui	Romania	4	1	3	0	6	4
Torpedo Moskva	Russia	4	1	2	1	3	5
Dundee United	Scotland	4	2	0	2	6	3
Aberdeen	Scotland	4	3	1	0	8	4
Vojvodina	Serbia	4	2	1	1	4	4
Petržalka	Slovakia	4	3	1	0	10	1
FK Kosice	Slovakia	4	3	1	0	14	6
Sporting Gijón	Spain	4	2	0	2	4	4
Tenerife	Spain	4	2	0	2	8	7
Östers IF	Sweden	4	3	0	1	5	2
Helsingborg	Sweden	4	2	1	1	4	2
Neuchâtel Xamax	Switzerland	4	3	1	0	9	1
Luzern	Switzerland	4	3	1	0	13	3
Göztepe	Turkey	4	3	1	0	7	2
Metalurh Donetsk	Ukraine	4	3	1	0	10	1
Metalist Kharkiv	Ukraine	4	0	1	3	1	5
Leicester City	England	4	2	2	0	7	5
İstanbul Başakşehir	Turkey	4	3	0	1	9	4
Sheriff Tiraspol	Moldova	4	4	0	0	11	3
Raków Częstochowa	Poland	4	4	0	0	10	2
Mladá Boleslav	Czech Republic	3	2	0	1	3	2
Middlesbrough	England	3	1	0	2	2	4
Eintracht Braunschweig	Germany	3	2	0	1	4	3
Shamrock Rovers	Republic of Ireland	3	3	0	0	5	0
CUF Barreiro	Portugal	3	2	0	1	3	2
Halmstad	Sweden	3	2	0	1	7	4
Bangor City	Wales	3	2	0	1	5	4
West Ham United	England	3	2	0	1	5	2
St. Gallen	Switzerland	3	2	1	0	9	3
LASK	Austria	3	2	0	1	11	1
Freiburg	Germany	3	2	1	0	4	1
Maccabi Tel Aviv	Israel	3	2	1	0	5	1
Pafos	Cyprus	3	3	0	0	8	3
Teuta	Albania	2	2	0	0	4	0
FK Partizani	Albania	2	1	0	1	3	2
Vllaznia	Albania	2	2	0	0	8	0
Grazer AK	Austria	2	1	0	1	1	1
SC Bregenz	Austria	2	1	1	0	2	1
ASKÖ Pasching	Austria	2	2	0	0	3	0
Wolfsberger AC	Austria	2	0	2	0	3	3
Neftchi Baku	Azerbaijan	2	1	1	0	5	3
Shakhtyor Soligorsk	Belarus	2	1	1	0	6	1
Lierse	Belgium	2	1	1	0	3	1
RWD Molenbeek	Belgium	2	1	1	0	4	3
Waregem	Belgium	2	0	1	1	2	3
Eendracht Aalst	Belgium	2	1	1	0	4	0
Harelbeke	Belgium	2	2	0	0	4	0
Zulte Waregem	Belgium	2	1	0	1	4	3
Široki Brijeg	Bosnia and Herzegovina	2	2	0	0	7	1
Željezničar	Bosnia and Herzegovina	2	0	2	0	3	3
Sarajevo	Bosnia and Herzegovina	2	1	1	0	10	2
Etar	Bulgaria	2	1	1	0	3	0
Dunav Ruse	Bulgaria	2	1	0	1	2	1
Akademik Sofia	Bulgaria	2	1	0	1	5	4
Beroe Stara Zagora	Bulgaria	2	1	0	1	3	1
Sliven	Bulgaria	2	2	0	0	8	1
Cherno More Varna	Bulgaria	2	2	0	0	2	0
Zagreb XI	Croatia	2	2	0	0	5	0
NK Zagreb	Croatia	2	1	1	0	2	1
RNK Split	Croatia	2	1	1	0	1	0
Digenis Akritas Morphou	Cyprus	2	2	0	0	7	0
Chmel Blšany	Czech Republic	2	1	1	0	4	3
Teplice	Czech Republic	2	2	0	0	8	2
BC Brno	Czech Republic	2	1	0	1	2	4
Baník Ostrava	Czech Republic	2	0	1	1	1	3
B1909	Denmark	2	2	0	0	6	2
Hvidovre IF	Denmark	2	1	1	0	7	4
B1903	Denmark	2	2	0	0	3	0
Silkeborg IF	Denmark	2	2	0	0	3	0
Nordsjaelland	Denmark	2	1	1	0	5	1
Esbjerg	Denmark	2	1	1	0	4	2
Sheffield Wednesday	England	2	1	0	1	1	4
West Bromwich Albion	England	2	2	0	0	6	1
Burnley	England	2	0	1	1	0	3
Derby County	England	2	1	1	0	3	1
Norwich City	England	2	2	0	0	2	0
Southampton	England	2	1	0	1	2	2
Turun Palloseura	Finland	2	1	0	1	2	1
Allianssi Vantaa	Finland	2	2	0	0	4	0
Tampere United	Finland	2	1	1	0	4	1
Stade Français	France	2	1	1	0	1	0
Metz	France	2	1	1	0	3	2
Bastia	France	2	0	0	2	3	5
Toulouse	France	2	1	0	1	1	1
1. FC Saarbrücken	Germany	2	1	0	1	7	5
Fortuna Düsseldorf	Germany	2	0	1	1	2	4
1. FC Nürnberg	Germany	2	1	0	1	4	3
Karlsruher SC	Germany	2	1	0	1	2	4
FSV Zwickau	Germany	2	1	0	1	1	1
Berliner FC Dynamo	Germany	2	1	0	1	4	2
Chemnitzer FC	Germany	2	2	0	0	3	1
AEL	Greece	2	1	1	0	2	1
OFI Crete	Greece	2	1	0	1	2	1
Xanthi	Greece	2	1	1	0	4	0
Vasas Budapest	Hungary	2	2	0	0	4	1
Pécs	Hungary	2	2	0	0	3	0
Videoton	Hungary	2	1	1	0	3	1
Tatabánya	Hungary	2	1	1	0	3	2
Valur	Iceland	2	2	0	0	11	0
KR Reykjavik	Iceland	2	2	0	0	8	1
Stjarnan	Iceland	2	2	0	0	9	0
Limerick	Republic of Ireland	2	2	0	0	5	0
Athlone Town	Republic of Ireland	2	1	1	0	3	0
Hapoel Be'er Sheva	Israel	2	0	0	2	2	5
Hapoel Haifa	Israel	2	2	0	0	6	1
FBK Kaunas	Lithuania	2	2	0	0	7	1
Union Luxembourg	Luxembourg	2	2	0	0	14	0
Aris Bonnevoie	Luxembourg	2	2	0	0	3	0
Avenir Beggen	Luxembourg	2	2	0	0	8	0
US Rumelange	Luxembourg	2	2	0	0	11	0
Red Boys Differdange	Luxembourg	2	2	0	0	7	1
Jeunesse D'Esch	Luxembourg	2	2	0	0	9	1
F91 Dudelange	Luxembourg	2	2	0	0	6	2
Vardar	Macedonia	2	1	1	0	5	1
Rabotnički	Macedonia	2	2	0	0	9	1
KF Shkëndija	Macedonia	2	2	0	0	7	0
Marsa	Malta	2	2	0	0	11	0
Floriana	Malta	2	2	0	0	8	1
Fortuna Sittard	Netherlands	2	1	1	0	5	3
FC Amsterdam	Netherlands	2	0	1	1	1	2
Heerenveen	Netherlands	2	2	0	0	5	2
Ards	Northern Ireland	2	1	1	0	3	1
Glentoran	Northern Ireland	2	2	0	0	6	0
Ballymena United	Northern Ireland	2	2	0	0	6	0
Lyn	Norway	2	1	1	0	2	0
Lillestrøm SK	Norway	2	1	0	1	3	2
Kongsvinger	Norway	2	1	1	0	3	1
Gwardia Warszawa	Poland	2	1	0	1	3	3
Śląsk Wrocław	Poland	2	1	1	0	2	0
Lechia Gdańsk	Poland	2	2	0	0	10	2
Pogoń Szczecin	Poland	2	1	1	0	4	2
Polonia Warsaw	Poland	2	2	0	0	3	0
Marítimo	Portugal	2	2	0	0	3	1
Paços de Ferreira	Portugal	2	1	1	0	3	0
Oțelul Galați	Romania	2	1	0	1	5	1
Ceahlăul Piatra Neamț	Romania	2	0	2	0	1	1
SR Brașov	Romania	2	2	0	0	6	0
Progresul București	Romania	2	1	0	1	3	3
Pandurii Târgu Jiu	Romania	2	2	0	0	5	1
Astra Giurgiu	Romania	2	1	1	0	4	0
Rotor Volgograd	Russia	2	1	1	0	3	0
Rostov	Russia	2	2	0	0	9	1
Anzhi Makhachkala	Russia	2	0	1	1	1	3
Belgrad XI	Serbia	2	1	0	1	5	1
Vojvodina	Serbia	2	0	1	1	0	2
Radnički Niš	Serbia	2	0	2	0	2	2
Rimavská Sobota	Slovakia	2	1	0	1	2	1
MŠK Žilina	Slovakia	2	1	0	1	4	3
Lokomotíva Košice	Slovakia	2	1	0	1	1	1
Olimpija Ljubljana	Slovenia	2	2	0	0	7	0
ND Gorica	Slovenia	2	2	0	0	11	1
NK Mura	Slovenia	2	2	0	0	5	1
Las Palmas	Spain	2	1	0	1	2	4
Oviedo	Spain	2	1	0	1	3	2
Alavés	Spain	2	0	1	1	3	5
Granada	Spain	2	1	0	1	2	3
Málaga	Spain	2	0	1	1	1	2
IK Brage	Sweden	2	2	0	0	4	2
Degerfors	Sweden	2	2	0	0	4	1
Trelleborg	Sweden	2	1	1	0	1	0
Djurgården	Sweden	2	1	1	0	6	3
Brommapojkarna	Sweden	2	2	0	0	7	0
Sion	Switzerland	2	1	0	1	4	3
Wettingen	Switzerland	2	1	1	0	2	1
Aarau	Switzerland	2	1	1	0	1	0
Lugano	Switzerland	2	0	1	1	1	2
Thun	Switzerland	2	0	2	0	3	3
Altay	Turkey	2	2	0	0	13	3
Eskişehirspor	Turkey	2	2	0	0	5	1
Adanaspor	Turkey	2	2	0	0	7	2
Gaziantepspor	Turkey	2	1	0	1	2	1
Gençlerbirliği	Turkey	2	0	0	2	0	4
Chernomorets Odesa	Ukraine	2	1	0	1	3	1
Kryvbas Kryvy Ryh	Ukraine	2	2	0	0	6	2
Wrexham	Wales	2	2	0	0	3	0
Merthyr Tydfil	Wales	2	1	0	1	3	2
Swansea City	Wales	2	1	1	0	3	1
Zorya Luhansk	Ukraine	2	2	0	0	7	0
HJK	Finland	2	2	0	0	5	1
RFS	Latvia	2	1	1	0	4	1
Sivasspor	Turkey	2	2	0	0	5	1
Union Berlin	Germany	2	1	1	0	2	1
Servette	Poland	2	1	1	0	5	1
Čukarički	Serbia	2	2	0	0	7	0
Brighton & Hove Albion	England	2	1	0	1	4	1
Crystal Palace	England	2	1	0	1	2	4
Puskás Akadémia	Hungary	2	0	2	0	4	4
Celje	Slovenia	2	1	1	0	4	3
Polissya Zhytomyr	Ukraine	2	2	0	0	6	2
Jagiellonia Białystok	Poland	2	1	0	1	5	4
NEC Nijmegen	Netherlands	2	1	0	1	5	2
Kairat	Kazakhstan	2	1	1	0	3	2
Antwerp	Belgium	1	1	0	0	3	1
Portsmouth	England	1	0	1	0	2	2
Egaleo	Greece	1	0	1	0	2	2
Maccabi Petah Tikva	Israel	1	1	0	0	2	1
Tromso	Norway	1	1	0	0	2	1
Rio Ave	Portugal	1	0	1	0	2	2
Mallorca	Spain	1	1	0	0	2	1
Osasuna	Spain	1	0	0	1	0	3
Getafe	Spain	1	1	0	0	2	0
The New Saints	Wales	1	1	0	0	2	0
Girona	Spain	1	1	0	0	1	0
Mainz 05	Germany	1	0	0	1	1	2
Bournemouth	England	1	0	0	1	0	3

== See also ==
- Serie A
