= Luca Marchegiani =

Italian footballer (born 1966)

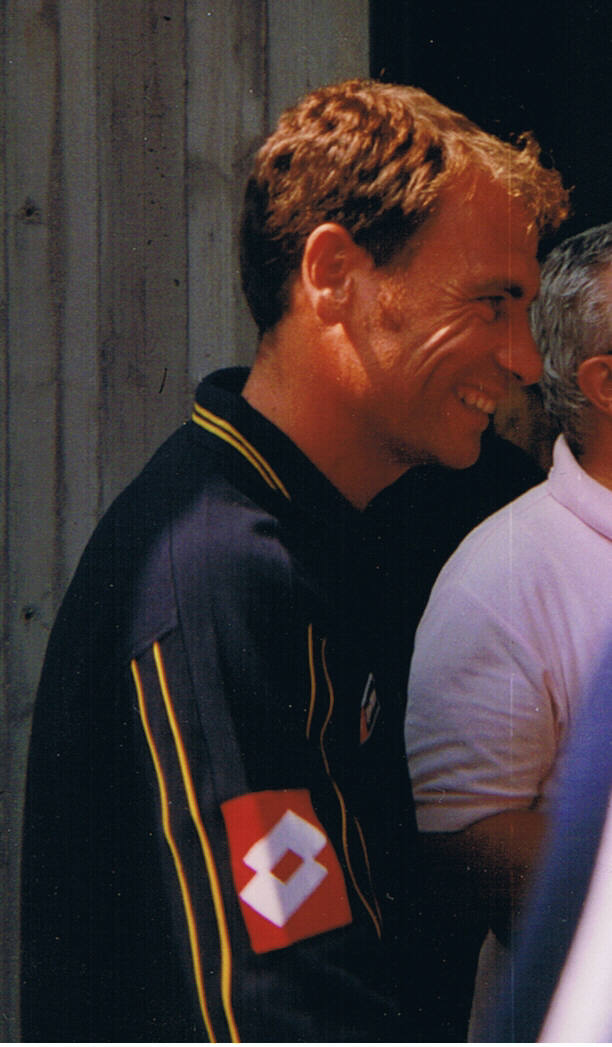
- Marchegiani in 2003

Personal information
- Full name: Luca Marchegiani
- Date of birth: 22 February 1966 (age 60)
- Place of birth: Ancona, Italy
- Height: 1.88 m (6 ft 2 in)
- Position: Goalkeeper

Youth career
- Jesi

Senior career*
Years	Team	Apps	(Gls)
1984–1987	Jesi	33	(0)
1985–1986	→ Aurora Latini (loan)	0	(0)
1987–1988	Brescia	1	(0)
1988–1993	Torino	146	(0)
1993–2003	Lazio	243	(0)
2003–2005	Chievo	66	(0)
Total		489	(0)

International career
1992–1996	Italy	9	(0)
Medal record
Representing Italy
FIFA World Cup
Runner-up	1994
- * Club domestic league appearances and goals

Luca Marchegiani (Italian pronunciation: [ˈluːka markeˈdʒaːni]; born 22 February 1966) is an Italian former professional footballer who played as a goalkeeper.

He represented several Italian clubs throughout his career, in particular Torino and Lazio, where he won various titles. At international level, he played for the Italy national team in the 1994 FIFA World Cup, where they reached the final.

He holds the longest unbeaten streak in Lazio's history, as well as the joint eighth-highest unbeaten streak in Serie A, alongside Gianluigi Buffon, having gone 745 consecutive minutes without conceding a goal in the Italian top division.

== Club career ==
After beginning his professional career with Jesi in 1986, for one season in the lower divisions, and subsequently Brescia for a season, in Serie B, Marchegiani spent the majority of his career at Torino FC and SS Lazio. With Torino (1988–1993), he won the Coppa Italia in 1993, and a Serie B title and a Mitropa Cup in 1991, earning promotion to Serie A; he also finished runner-up in the 1993 Supercoppa Italiana and the 1991–92 UEFA Cup, and managed a third-place finish in Serie A during the 1991–92 season, whilst playing for the club.

At one point in his career, Marchegiani was the most expensive goalkeeper in the world, when he joined Lazio from Torino in 1993 for £6m; during this period he was regarded as one of the best and most reliable goalkeepers in Italy and in world football. During his time with Lazio he won the Serie A, two Italian Cups, two Italian Supercups, an UEFA Cup Winners' Cup, and an UEFA Super Cup, also reaching another UEFA Cup Final in 1998. In 2003, he moved to and ended his playing career at ChievoVerona, where he remained until retiring in 2005.

== International career ==
Marchegiani played for Italy national football team on 9 occasions between 1991 and 1996. He was initially selected by Arrigo Sacchi as the successor of the former first-choice keeper Walter Zenga, but lost his place after a mediocre performance in a 2–2 draw against Switzerland during the 1994 FIFA World Cup qualification: he conceded the first goal, scored by Christophe Ohrel, after failing to catch a cross, an unusual mistake for him, and then poorly controlled a back-pass with his feet, enabling the opposing striker Stéphane Chapuisat to score for the second time.

At the 1994 FIFA World Cup he was selected as Italy's second-choice keeper behind Gianluca Pagliuca, who was more skilled with the ball at his feet, but still managed to play three matches: his first appearance was as a substitute against Norway, following the sending off of Pagliuca, coming on for Roberto Baggio, and helping the 10-man Italian squad to keep a clean sheet and win the match 1–0; he also appeared in the final group match against Mexico (a 1–1 draw), and in the 2–1 extra-time victory over Nigeria in the round of 16. Despite Marchegiani's excellent performances, which led some pundits to advocate his confirmation, Pagliuca recovered the starting spot after his two-game suspension, and played the remaining games. Italy reached the final, where they lost to Brazil on penalties.

== Style of play ==
A consistent, elegant, intelligent, composed and complete goalkeeper, Marchegiani is regarded as one of the best goalkeepers of his generation. He was known in particular for his agility, positional sense, reactions, and his speed when rushing off his line, as well as his efficient technique, reliable handling, movement, and his ability to read the game; in particular, he stood out throughout his career for his outstanding ability to come out and claim crosses and high balls. In addition to his shot-stopping abilities, he was also remembered for his professionalism, as well as his dedication. In spite of his reserved character, he was a resolute goalkeeper, who inspired confidence in his defenders. Although he was not particularly adept or confident with the ball at his feet following the establishment of the back-pass rule, and did not have a particularly powerful or deep goal kick, he possessed excellent vision, and later worked to improve this aspect of his game throughout his career. He was also effective at stopping penalties: in his career, he stopped 18 penalties in Serie A from 69 attempts in 422 appearances between 1988 and 2005, with a career save percentage of 26.1%; he has saved the fourth–highest number of penalties in Serie A history. During the 2003–04 season, he saved five spot kicks.

Because of his calm and composure, he was nicknamed Il Conte ("The Count"). He has cited Giovanni Galli as one of his major influences as a goalkeeper.

== Retirement ==
Marchegiani works as a pundit for Sky Italia. He features in Konami's Pro Evolution Soccer series as a technical commentator; from the 2012 edition to the 2014 edition, he featured alongside Pierluigi Pardo, while he was subsequently partnered with Fabio Caressa from the 2015 edition onwards.

== Personal life ==
His son Gabriele Marchegiani made his professional debut as a goalkeeper in 2016.

== Honours ==
=== Club ===
Torino

- Serie B: 1990–91
- Coppa Italia: 1992–93
- Mitropa Cup: 1991

Lazio

- Serie A: 1999–2000
- Coppa Italia: 1997–98, 1999–2000
- Supercoppa Italiana: 1998, 2000
- UEFA Cup Winners' Cup: 1998–99
- UEFA Super Cup: 1999
