= SS Lazio in European football =

Italian club in European football

- Club: SS Lazio
- Seasons played: 30
- First entry: 1970–71 Inter-Cities Fairs Cup
- Latest entry: 2024–25 UEFA Europa League

Titles
- Cup Winners' Cup: 1: 1998–99
- Super Cup: 1: 1999

These are the matches that Lazio have played in European football competitions. In UEFA European football, Lazio have won the 1998–99 UEFA Cup Winners' Cup and the 1999 UEFA Super Cup.

== UEFA-organised seasonal competitions ==
Lazio's score listed first.

=== UEFA champions league ===
Season	Round	Opposition	Home	Away	Aggregate	Reference
1999–2000	First group stage	(Germany) Bayer Leverkusen	1–1	1–1	1st	
1999–2000	First group stage	(Ukraine) Dynamo Kyiv	2–1	1–0	1st	
1999–2000	First group stage	(Slovenia) Maribor	4–0	4–0	1st	
1999–2000	Second group stage	(France) Marseille	5–1	2–0	1st	
1999–2000	Second group stage	(England) Chelsea	0–0	2–1	1st	
1999–2000	Second group stage	(Netherlands) Feyenoord	1–2	0–0	1st	
1999–2000	Quarter-finals	(Spain) Valencia	1–0	2–5	3–5	
2000–01	First group stage	(Ukraine) Shakhtar Donetsk	5–1	3–0	2nd	
2000–01	First group stage	(Czech Republic) Sparta Prague	3–0	1–0	2nd	
2000–01	First group stage	(England) Arsenal	1–1	0–2	2nd	
2000–01	Second group stage	(Belgium) Anderlecht	2–1	0–1	4th	
2000–01	Second group stage	(England) Leeds United	0–1	3–3	4th	
2000–01	Second group stage	(Spain) Real Madrid	2–2	2–3	4th	
2001–02	Third qualifying round	(Denmark) Copenhagen	4–1	1–2	5–3	
2001–02	First group stage	(Turkey) Galatasaray	1–0	0–1	4th	
2001–02	First group stage	(France) Nantes	1–3	0–1	4th	
2001–02	First group stage	(Netherlands) PSV Eindhoven	2–1	0–1	4th	
2003–04	Third qualifying round	(Portugal) Benfica	3–1	1–0	4–1	
2003–04	Group stage	(Turkey) Beşiktaş	1–1	2–0	4th	
2003–04	Group stage	(Czech Republic) Sparta Prague	2–2	0–1	4th	
2003–04	Group stage	(England) Chelsea	0–4	1–2	4th	
2007–08	Third qualifying round	(Romania) Dinamo București	1–1	3–1	4–2	
2007–08	Group stage	(Greece) Olympiacos	1–2	1–1	4th	
2007–08	Group stage	(Spain) Real Madrid	2–2	1–3	4th	
2007–08	Group stage	(Germany) Werder Bremen	2–1	1–2	4th	
2015–16	Play-off round	(Germany) Bayer Leverkusen	1–0	0–3	1–3	
2020–21	Group stage	(Russia) Zenit Saint Petersburg	3–1	1–1	2nd	
2020–21	Group stage	(Germany) Borussia Dortmund	3–1	1–1	2nd	
2020–21	Group stage	(Belgium) Club Brugge	2–2	1–1	2nd	
2020–21	Round of 16	(Germany) Bayern Munich	1–4	1–2	2–6	
2023–24	Group stage	(Spain) Atlético Madrid	1–1	0–2	2nd	
2023–24	Group stage	(Scotland) Celtic	2–0	2–1	2nd	
2023–24	Group stage	(Netherlands) Feyenoord	1–0	1–3	2nd	
2023–24	Round of 16	(Germany) Bayern Munich	1–0	0–3	1–3	

=== UEFA Cup Winners' Cup ===
Season	Round	Opposition	Home	Away	Aggregate	Reference
1998–99	First round	(Switzerland) Lausanne-Sport	1–1	2–2	3–3 (a)	
1998–99	Second round	(Federal Republic of Yugoslavia) Partizan	0–0	3–2	3–2	
1998–99	Quarter-finals	(Greece) Panionios	3–0	4–0	7–0	
1998–99	Semi-finals	(Russia) Lokomotiv Moscow	0–0	1–1	1–1 (a)	
1998–99	Final	(Spain) Mallorca	2–1			

=== UEFA Cup / UEFA Europa League ===
Season	Round	Opposition	Home	Away	Aggregate	Reference
1973–74	First round	(Switzerland) Sion	3–0	1–3	4–3	
1973–74	Second round	(England) Ipswich Town	4–2	0–4	4–6	
1975–76	First round	(Soviet Union) Chornomorets Odesa	3–0 (a.e.t.)	0–1	3–1	
1975–76	Second round	(Spain) Barcelona	Lazio withdrew	0–4	0–7	
1977–78	First round	(Portugal) Boavista	5–0	0–1	5–1	
1977–78	Second round	(France) Lens	2–0	0–6 (a.e.t.)	2–6	
1993–94	First round	(Bulgaria) Lokomotiv Plovdiv	2–0	2–0	4–0	
1993–94	Second round	(Portugal) Boavista	1–0	0–2	1–2	
1994–95	First round	(Belarus) Dinamo Minsk	4–1	0–0	4–1	
1994–95	Second round	(Sweden) Trelleborg	1–0	0–0	1–0	
1994–95	Third round	(Turkey) Trabzonspor	2–1	2–1	4–2	
1994–95	Quarter-finals	(Germany) Borussia Dortmund	1–0	0–2	1–2	
1995–96	First round	(Cyprus) Omonia	5–0	2–1	7–1	
1995–96	Second round	(France) Lyon	0–2	1–2	1–4	
1996–97	First round	(France) Lens	1–1	1–0	2–1	
1996–97	Second round	(Spain) Tenerife	1–0	3–5	4–5	
1997–98	First round	(Portugal) Vitória Guimarães	2–1	4–0	6–1	
1997–98	Second round	(Russia) Rotor Volgograd	3–0	0–0	3–0	
1997–98	Third round	(Austria) Rapid Wien	1–0	2–0	3–0	
1997–98	Quarter-finals	(France) Auxerre	1–0	2–2	3–2	
1997–98	Semi-finals	(Spain) Atlético Madrid	0–0	1–0	1–0	
1997–98	Final	(Italy) Internazionale	0–3			
2002–03	First round	(Greece) Skoda Xanthi	4–0	0–0	4–0	
2002–03	Second round	(Federal Republic of Yugoslavia) Red Star Belgrade	1–0	1–1	2–1	
2002–03	Third round	(Austria) Sturm Graz	0–1	3–1	3–2	
2002–03	Fourth round	(Poland) Wisła Kraków	3–3	2–1	5–4	
2002–03	Quarter-finals	(Turkey) Beşiktaş	1–0	2–1	3–1	
2002–03	Semi-finals	(Portugal) Porto	0–0	1–4	1–4	
2004–05	First round	(Ukraine) Metalurh Donetsk	3–0	3–0	6–0	
2004–05	Group stage	(Spain) Villarreal	1–1	—N/a	4th	
2004–05	Group stage	(England) Middlesbrough	—N/a	0–2	4th	
2004–05	Group stage	(Federal Republic of Yugoslavia) Partizan	2–2	—N/a	4th	
2004–05	Group stage	(Greece) Egaleo	—N/a	2–2	4th	
2009–10	Play-off round	(Sweden) Elfsborg	3–0	0–1	3–1	
2009–10	Group stage	(Austria) Red Bull Salzburg	1–2	1–2	3rd	
2009–10	Group stage	(Bulgaria) Levski Sofia	0–1	4–0	3rd	
2009–10	Group stage	(Spain) Villarreal	2–1	1–4	3rd	
2011–12	Play-off round	(North Macedonia) Rabotnički	6–0	3–1	9–1	
2011–12	Group stage	(Romania) Vaslui	2–2	0–0	2nd	
2011–12	Group stage	(Portugal) Sporting CP	2–0	1–2	2nd	
2011–12	Group stage	(Switzerland) Zürich	1–0	1–1	2nd	
2011–12	Round of 32	(Spain) Atlético Madrid	1–3	0–1	1–4	
2012–13	Play-off round	(Slovenia) Mura 05	3–1	2–0	5–1	
2012–13	Group stage	(England) Tottenham Hotspur	0–0	0–0	1st	
2012–13	Group stage	(Slovenia) Maribor	1–0	4–1	1st	
2012–13	Group stage	(Greece) Panathinaikos	3–0	1–1	1st	
2012–13	Round of 32	(Germany) Borussia Mönchengladbach	2–0	3–3	5–3	
2012–13	Round of 16	(Germany) VfB Stuttgart	3–1	2–0	5–1	
2012–13	Quarter-finals	(Turkey) Fenerbahçe	1–1	0–2	1–3	
2013–14	Group stage	(Poland) Legia Warsaw	1–0	2–0	2nd	
2013–14	Group stage	(Turkey) Trabzonspor	0–0	3–3	2nd	
2013–14	Group stage	(Cyprus) Apollon Limassol	2–1	0–0	2nd	
2013–14	Round of 32	(Bulgaria) Ludogorets Razgrad	0–1	3–3	3–4	
2015–16	Group stage	(Ukraine) Dnipro Dnipropetrovsk	3–1	1–1	1st	
2015–16	Group stage	(France) Saint-Étienne	3–2	1–1	1st	
2015–16	Group stage	(Norway) Rosenborg	3–1	2–0	1st	
2015–16	Round of 32	(Turkey) Galatasaray	3–1	1–1	4–2	
2015–16	Round of 16	(Czech Republic) Sparta Prague	0–3	1–1	1–4	
2017–18	Group stage	(France) Nice	1–0	3–1	1st	
2017–18	Group stage	(Belgium) Zulte Waregem	2–0	2–3	1st	
2017–18	Group stage	(Netherlands) Vitesse	1–1	3–2	1st	
2017–18	Round of 32	(Romania) FCSB	5–1	0–1	5–2	
2017–18	Round of 16	(Ukraine) Dynamo Kyiv	2–2	2–0	4–2	
2017–18	Quarter-finals	(Austria) Red Bull Salzburg	4–2	1–4	5–6	
2018–19	Group stage	(Cyprus) Apollon Limassol	2–1	0–2	2nd	
2018–19	Group stage	(France) Marseille	2–1	3–1	2nd	
2018–19	Group stage	(Germany) Eintracht Frankfurt	1–2	1–4	2nd	
2018–19	Round of 32	(Spain) Sevilla	0–1	0–2	0–3	
2019–20	Group stage	(Scotland) Celtic	1–2	1–2	3rd	
2019–20	Group stage	(France) Rennes	2–1	0–2	3rd	
2019–20	Group stage	(Romania) CFR Cluj	1–0	1–2	3rd	
2021–22	Group stage	(Russia) Lokomotiv Moscow	2–0	3–0	2nd	
2021–22	Group stage	(France) Marseille	0–0	2–2	2nd	
2021–22	Group stage	(Turkey) Galatasaray	0–0	0–1	2nd	
2021–22	Knockout round play-offs	(Portugal) Porto	2–2	1–2	3–4	
2022–23	Group stage	(Netherlands) Feyenoord	4–2	0–1	3rd	
2022–23	Group stage	(Denmark) Midtjylland	2–1	1–5	3rd	
2022–23	Group stage	(Austria) Sturm Graz	2–2	0–0	3rd	
2024–25	League phase	(Ukraine) Dynamo Kyiv	—N/a	3–0	1st	
2024–25	League phase	(France) Nice	4–1	—N/a	1st	
2024–25	League phase	(Netherlands) Twente	—N/a	2–0	1st	
2024–25	League phase	(Portugal) Porto	2–1	—N/a	1st	
2024–25	League phase	(Bulgaria) Ludogorets Razgrad	0–0	—N/a	1st	
2024–25	League phase	(Netherlands) Ajax	—N/a	3–1	1st	
2024–25	League phase	(Spain) Real Sociedad	3–1	—N/a	1st	
2024–25	League phase	(Portugal) Braga	—N/a	0–1	1st	
2024–25	Round of 16	(Czech Republic) Viktoria Plzeň	1–1	2–1	3–2	
2024–25	Quarter-finals	(Norway) Bodø/Glimt	3–1 (a.e.t.)	0–2	3–3 (2–3 p)	

=== UEFA Europa Conference League ===
Season	Round	Opposition	Home	Away	Aggregate	Reference
2022–23	Knockout round play-offs	(Romania) CFR Cluj	1–0	0–0	1–0	
2022–23	Round of 16	(Netherlands) AZ	1–2	1–2	2–4	

=== UEFA Super Cup ===
Season	Opposition	Score	Reference
1999	(England) Manchester United	1–0	

=== UEFA Intertoto Cup ===
Season	Round	Opposition	Home	Away	Aggregate	Reference
2005	Third Round	(Finland) Tampere United	3–0	1–1	4–1	
2005	Semi-finals	(France) Marseille	1–1	0–3	1–4	

== FIFA-only recognized seasonal competitions ==
=== Inter-Cities Fairs Cup ===
Season	Round	Opposition	Home	Away	Aggregate
1970–71	First round	(England) Arsenal	2–2	0–2	2–4

== Overall record ==
=== UEFA competitions record ===
As of 17 April 2025.

Competition	Pld	W	D	L	GF	GA	GD	Win%
UEFA Champions League	68	28	17	23	101	87	+14	41.18
UEFA Cup Winners' Cup	9	4	5	0	16	7	+9	44.44
UEFA Cup / UEFA Europa League	163	79	39	45	258	186	+72	48.47
UEFA Europa Conference League	4	1	1	2	3	4	−1	25.00
UEFA Super Cup	1	1	0	0	1	0	+1	100.00
UEFA Intertoto Cup	4	1	2	1	5	5	+0	25.00
Total	249	114	64	71	384	289	+95	45.78

Source: UEFA.com
Pld = Matches played; W = Matches won; D = Matches drawn; L = Matches lost; GF = Goals for; GA = Goals against; GD = Goal Difference.

=== By country and club ===
As of 17 April 2025.
Key

Positive balance (more wins than losses)
Neutral balance (as many wins as losses)
Negative balance (more losses than wins)

Country	Club	Pld	W	D	L	GF	GA	GD
Austria	Rapid Wien	2	2	0	0	3	0	+3
Austria	Red Bull Salzburg	4	1	0	3	7	10	–3
Austria	Sturm Graz	4	1	2	1	5	4	+1
Subtotal		10	4	2	4	15	14	+1
Belarus	Dinamo Minsk	2	1	1	0	4	1	+3
Subtotal		2	1	1	0	4	1	+3
Belgium	Anderlecht	2	1	0	1	2	2	0
Belgium	Club Brugge	2	0	2	0	3	3	0
Belgium	Zulte Waregem	2	1	0	1	4	3	+1
Subtotal		6	2	2	2	9	8	+1
Bulgaria	Levski Sofia	2	1	0	1	4	1	+3
Bulgaria	Lokomotiv Plovdiv	2	2	0	0	4	0	+4
Bulgaria	Ludogorets Razgrad	3	0	2	1	3	4	–1
Subtotal		7	3	2	2	11	5	+6
Cyprus	Apollon Limassol	4	2	1	1	4	4	0
Cyprus	Omonia	2	2	0	0	7	1	+6
Subtotal		6	4	1	1	11	5	+6
Czech Republic	Sparta Prague	6	2	2	2	7	7	0
Czech Republic	Viktoria Plzeň	2	1	1	0	3	2	+1
Subtotal		8	3	3	2	10	9	+1
Denmark	Copenhagen	2	1	0	1	5	3	+2
Denmark	Midtjylland	2	1	0	1	3	6	–3
Subtotal		4	2	0	2	8	9	–1
England	Arsenal	2	0	1	1	1	3	–2
England	Chelsea	4	1	1	2	3	7	–4
England	Ipswich Town	2	1	0	1	4	6	–2
England	Leeds United	2	0	1	1	3	4	–1
England	Manchester United	1	1	0	0	1	0	+1
England	Middlesbrough	1	0	0	1	0	2	–2
England	Tottenham Hotspur	2	0	2	0	0	0	0
Subtotal		14	3	5	6	12	22	–10
Finland	Tampere United	2	1	1	0	4	1	+3
Subtotal		2	1	1	0	4	1	+3
France	Auxerre	2	1	1	0	3	2	+1
France	Lens	4	2	1	1	4	7	–3
France	Lyon	2	0	0	2	1	4	–3
France	Marseille	8	4	3	1	15	9	+6
France	Nantes	2	0	0	2	1	4	–3
France	Nice	3	3	0	0	8	2	+6
France	Rennes	2	1	0	1	2	3	–1
France	Saint-Étienne	2	1	1	0	4	3	+1
Subtotal		25	12	6	7	38	34	+4
Germany	Bayer Leverkusen	4	1	2	1	3	5	–2
Germany	Bayern Munich	4	1	0	3	3	9	–6
Germany	Borussia Dortmund	4	2	1	1	5	4	+1
Germany	Eintracht Frankfurt	2	0	0	2	2	6	–4
Germany	Borussia Mönchengladbach	2	1	1	0	5	3	+2
Germany	VfB Stuttgart	2	2	0	0	5	1	+4
Germany	Werder Bremen	2	1	0	1	3	3	0
Subtotal		20	8	4	8	26	31	−5
Greece	Egaleo	1	0	1	0	2	2	0
Greece	Olympiacos	2	0	1	1	2	3	–1
Greece	Panathinaikos	2	1	1	0	4	1	+3
Greece	Panionios	2	2	0	0	7	0	+7
Greece	Xanthi	2	1	1	0	4	0	+4
Subtotal		9	4	4	1	19	6	+13
Italy	Internazionale	1	0	0	1	0	3	–3
Subtotal		1	0	0	1	0	3	–3
(North Macedonia) Macedonia	Rabotnički	2	2	0	0	9	1	+8
Subtotal		2	2	0	0	9	1	+8
Netherlands	Ajax	1	1	0	0	3	1	+2
Netherlands	AZ	2	0	0	2	2	4	–2
Netherlands	Feyenoord	6	2	1	3	7	8	–1
Netherlands	PSV Eindhoven	2	1	0	1	2	2	0
Netherlands	Twente	1	1	0	0	2	0	+2
Netherlands	Vitesse	2	1	1	0	4	3	+1
Subtotal		14	6	2	6	20	18	+2
Norway	Bodø/Glimt	2	1	0	1	3	3	0
Norway	Rosenborg	2	2	0	0	5	1	+4
Subtotal		4	3	0	1	8	6	+2
Poland	Legia Warsaw	2	2	0	0	3	0	+3
Poland	Wisła Kraków	2	1	1	0	5	4	+1
Subtotal		4	3	1	0	8	4	+4
Portugal	Benfica	2	2	0	0	4	1	+3
Portugal	Boavista	4	2	0	2	6	3	+3
Portugal	Braga	1	0	0	1	0	1	–1
Portugal	Porto	5	1	2	2	6	9	–3
Portugal	Sporting CP	2	1	0	1	3	2	+1
Portugal	Vitória de Guimarães	2	2	0	0	6	1	+5
Subtotal		16	8	2	6	25	17	+8
Romania	Dinamo București	2	1	1	0	4	2	+2
Romania	CFR Cluj	4	2	1	1	3	2	+1
Romania	Steaua București	2	1	0	1	5	2	+3
Romania	Vaslui	2	0	2	0	2	2	0
Subtotal		10	4	4	2	14	8	+6
Russia	Lokomotiv Moscow	4	2	2	0	6	1	+5
Russia	Rotor Volgograd	2	1	1	0	3	0	+3
Russia	Zenit Saint Petersburg	2	1	1	0	4	2	+2
Subtotal		8	4	4	0	13	3	+10
Scotland	Celtic	4	2	0	2	6	5	+1
Subtotal		4	2	0	2	6	5	+1
Serbia	Partizan	3	1	2	0	5	4	+1
Serbia	Red Star Belgrade	2	1	1	0	2	1	+1
Subtotal		5	2	3	0	7	5	+2
Slovenia	Maribor	4	4	0	0	13	1	+12
Slovenia	Mura 05	2	2	0	0	5	1	+4
Subtotal		6	6	0	0	18	2	+16
Spain	Atlético Madrid	6	1	2	3	3	7	–4
Spain	Barcelona	2	0	0	2	0	7	–7
Spain	Mallorca	1	1	0	0	2	1	+1
Spain	Real Madrid	4	0	2	2	7	10	–3
Spain	Real Sociedad	1	1	0	0	3	1	+2
Spain	Sevilla	2	0	0	2	0	3	–3
Spain	Tenerife	2	1	0	1	4	5	–1
Spain	Valencia	2	1	0	1	3	5	–2
Spain	Villarreal	3	1	1	1	4	6	–2
Subtotal		23	6	5	12	26	45	–19
Sweden	IF Elfsborg	2	1	0	1	3	1	+2
Sweden	Trelleborg	2	1	1	0	1	0	+1
Subtotal		4	2	1	1	4	1	+3
Switzerland	Lausanne-Sport	2	0	2	0	3	3	0
Switzerland	Sion	2	1	0	1	4	3	+1
Switzerland	Zürich	2	1	1	0	2	1	+1
Subtotal		6	2	3	1	9	7	+2
Turkey	Beşiktaş	4	3	1	0	6	2	+4
Turkey	Fenerbahçe	2	0	1	1	1	3	–2
Turkey	Galatasaray	6	2	2	2	5	4	+1
Turkey	Trabzonspor	4	2	2	0	7	5	+2
Subtotal		16	7	6	3	19	14	+5
Ukraine	Chornomorets Odesa	2	1	0	1	3	1	+2
Ukraine	Dnipro	2	1	1	0	4	2	+2
Ukraine	Dynamo Kyiv	5	4	1	0	10	3	+7
Ukraine	Metalurh Donetsk	2	2	0	0	6	0	+6
Ukraine	Shakhtar Donetsk	2	2	0	0	8	1	+7
Subtotal		13	10	2	1	31	7	+24
