= 1998 UEFA Cup final =

- Match programme cover
- Event: 1997–98 UEFA Cup
Lazio	Internazionale
(Italy)	(Italy)
0	3
- Date: 6 May 1998
- Venue: Parc des Princes, Paris
- Man of the Match: Ronaldo (Inter Milan)
- Referee: Antonio López Nieto (Spain)
- Attendance: 44,412

The 1998 UEFA Cup final was a football match played at Parc des Princes in Paris, France on 6 May 1998 as the conclusion to the 1997–98 UEFA Cup. It was the first time that the UEFA Cup final was played as a single leg at a neutral venue.

The match was played between two Italian teams – Lazio and Internazionale, commonly known as Inter. Inter won the match 3–0 to win the UEFA Cup for the third time – a joint record with Juventus at the time.

== Background ==
Internazionale were one of the most successful Italian football teams. They had won the European Cup twice in 1964 and 1965 and the UEFA Cup twice in 1991 and 1994.

Lazio had never played in a European final before. Their previous best run was to the quarter-finals of the 1994–95 UEFA Cup.

Since the inaugural edition in 1971–72, the UEFA Cup final had been played over two legs on a home and away basis. From the 1997–98 season, the final would be played as a single leg at a neutral venue.

== Route to the final ==
Lazio				Round	Internazionale			
Opponent	Agg.	1st leg	2nd leg		Opponent	Agg.	1st leg	2nd leg
(Portugal) Vitória de Guimarães	6–1	4–0 (A)	2–1 (H)	First round	(Switzerland) Neuchâtel Xamax	4–0	2–0 (H)	2–0 (A)
(Russia) Rotor Volgograd	3–0	0–0 (A)	3–0 (H)	Second round	(France) Lyon	4–3	1–2 (H)	3–1 (A)
(Austria) Rapid Wien	3–0	2–0 (A)	1–0 (H)	Third round	(France) Strasbourg	3–2	0–2 (A)	3–0 (H)
(France) Auxerre	3–2	1–0 (H)	2–2 (A)	Quarter-finals	(Germany) Schalke 04	2–1 (a.e.t.)	1–0 (H)	1–1 (a.e.t.) (A)
(Spain) Atlético Madrid	1–0	1–0 (A)	0–0 (H)	Semi-finals	(Russia) Spartak Moscow	4–2	2–1 (H)	2–1 (A)

=== Lazio ===
Lazio qualified for the 1997–98 UEFA Cup by finishing fourth in the 1996–97 Serie A.

In the first round, Lazio faced Portuguese side Vitória de Guimarães. They won 4–0 in the first leg at the Estádio D. Afonso Henriques in Guimarães on 16 September 1997 and 2–1 in the second leg at the Stadio Olimpico in Rome two weeks later to progress 6–1 on aggregate.

Lazio faced Russian side Rotor Volgograd in the second round. After a 0–0 draw in the first leg at the Central Stadium in Volgograd on 21 October 1997, Lazio progressed with a 3–0 win (3–0 on aggregate) in the second leg at the Stadio Olimpico two weeks later.

In round three, Lazio faced Austrian side Rapid Wien. Lazio won the first leg 2–0 at the Ernst-Happel-Stadion in Vienna on 25 November 1997 and progressed to the quarter-finals 3–0 on aggregate after winning the second leg 1–0 at the Stadio Olimpico two weeks later.

French club AJ Auxerre were Lazio's opponents in the quarter-finals. After winning the first leg 1–0 at the Stadio Olimpico on 3 March 1998, Lazio advanced to the semi-finals following a 2–2 draw (3–2 on aggregate) in the second leg at the Stade de l'Abbé-Deschamps in Auxerre two weeks later.

Lazio faced Atlético Madrid of Spain in the semi-finals. Lazio won the first leg 1–0 at the Vicente Calderón Stadium in Madrid on 31 March 1998 and progressed to the final after a goalless draw (1–0 on aggregate) in the second leg at the Stadio Olimpico two weeks later.

=== Internazionale ===
Internazionale qualified for the 1997–98 UEFA Cup by finishing third in the 1996–97 Serie A.

Neuchâtel Xamax of Switzerland were Inter's opponents in the first round. Inter won the first leg at the Stadio Giuseppe Meazza in Milan 2–0 on 16 September 1997 before winning the second leg at the Stade de la Maladière in Neuchâtel two weeks later by the same scoreline (4–0 on aggregate).

In the second round, Inter faced French club Lyon. After losing the first leg 2–1 at the Giuseppe Meazza on 21 October 1997, Inter came back to win the second leg 3–1 at the Stade de Gerland in Lyon two weeks later to progress 4–3 on aggregate.

They would return to France in the third round to play Strasbourg. Again, Inter lost the first leg – 2–0 at the Stade de la Meinau in Strasbourg on 25 November 1997 – and again they came back to win the second leg at the Giuseppe Meazza 3–0 (3–2 on aggregate) two weeks later to progress to the quarter-finals.

In the quarter-finals, Inter faced German club Schalke 04. After winning the first leg 1–0 at the Giuseppe Meazza on 3 March 1998, the second leg at Parkstadion in Gelsenkirchen two weeks later went to extra time after finishing 1–0 to Schalke 04 (1–1 on aggregate) in 90 minutes. Inter scored the only goal of extra time to progress to the semi-finals 2–1 on aggregate.

Russian side Spartak Moscow were Inter's opponents in the semi-finals. After winning the first leg at the Giuseppe Meazza 2–1 on 31 March 1998, Inter won the second leg at the Central Dynamo Stadium in Moscow two weeks later by the same scoreline (4–2 on aggregate) to reach the final.

== Match ==
=== Details ===
6 May 1998
20:45 CEST

Lazio (Italy)	0–3	(Italy) Internazionale
	Report	Zamorano 5'; Zanetti 60'; Ronaldo 70'

Parc des Princes, Paris
Attendance: 44,412
Referee: Antonio López Nieto (Spain)

Lazio	Internazionale

GK	1	(Italy) Luca Marchegiani
RB	20	(Italy) Alessandro Grandoni		(substituted off) 55'
CB	13	(Italy) Alessandro Nesta
CB	2	(Italy) Paolo Negro	(yellow card) 70'
LB	5	(Italy) Giuseppe Favalli
RM	14	(Italy) Diego Fuser (c)
CM	23	(Italy) Giorgio Venturin		(substituted off) 49'
CM	21	(Federal Republic of Yugoslavia) Vladimir Jugović	(yellow card) 59'
LM	18	(Czech Republic) Pavel Nedvěd
CF	9	(Italy) Pierluigi Casiraghi
CF	10	(Italy) Roberto Mancini
Substitutes:
GK	22	(Italy) Marco Ballotta
DF	3	(Italy) Giovanni Lopez
DF	17	(Italy) Guerino Gottardi		(substituted on) 55'
MF	4	(Italy) Dario Marcolin
MF	25	(Argentina) Matías Almeyda	(yellow card) 63' (red card) 88'	(substituted on) 49'
FW	7	(Italy) Roberto Rambaudi
Manager:
(Sweden) Sven-Göran Eriksson

GK	1	(Italy) Gianluca Pagliuca (c)
SW	7	(Italy) Salvatore Fresi	(yellow card) 18'
RB	33	(Italy) Francesco Colonnese
CB	16	(Nigeria) Taribo West	(red card) 82'
LB	4	(Argentina) Javier Zanetti	(yellow card) 63'
RM	8	(Netherlands) Aron Winter		(substituted off) 69'
CM	13	(Brazil) Zé Elias
LM	14	(Argentina) Diego Simeone
AM	6	(France) Youri Djorkaeff		(substituted off) 69'
CF	9	(Chile) Iván Zamorano		(substituted off) 74'
CF	10	(Brazil) Ronaldo	(yellow card) 74'
Substitutes:
GK	12	(Italy) Andrea Mazzantini
DF	5	(Italy) Fabio Galante
DF	24	(Italy) Luigi Sartor		(substituted on) 74'
MF	15	(France) Benoît Cauet		(substituted on) 69'
MF	17	(Italy) Francesco Moriero		(substituted on) 69'
FW	11	(Nigeria) Nwankwo Kanu
FW	20	(Uruguay) Álvaro Recoba
Manager:
(Italy) Luigi Simoni

Man of the Match:
Ronaldo (Inter)

Assistant referees:
Fernando Tresaco Gracia (Spain)
Victoriano Giráldez Carrasco (Spain)
Fourth official:
Arturo Daudén Ibáñez (Spain)

Match rules

- 90 minutes
- 30 minutes of golden goal extra time if necessary
- Penalty shoot-out if scores still level
- Seven named substitutes
- Maximum of three substitutions

== See also ==
- 1998 UEFA Champions League final
- 1998 UEFA Cup Winners' Cup final
- Italian football clubs in international competitions
- Inter Milan in international football
- SS Lazio in European football
- 1997–98 Inter Milan season
- 1997–98 SS Lazio season
