= 1999 UEFA Super Cup =

- Match programme cover
Manchester United	Lazio
(England)	(Italy)
0	1
- Date: 27 August 1999
- Venue: Stade Louis II, Monaco
- Man of the Match: Juan Sebastián Verón (Lazio)
- Referee: Ryszard Wójcik (Poland)
- Attendance: 14,461

The 1999 UEFA Super Cup was a football match played on 27 August 1999 between the 1998–99 UEFA Champions League winners, Manchester United, and Lazio, winners of the 1998–99 UEFA Cup Winners' Cup.

Lazio won the match 1–0, the winning goal coming from Chilean striker Marcelo Salas in the 35th minute. The match was played at a neutral venue, the Stade Louis II in Monaco, in front of 14,461 spectators.

This was the last Super Cup contested by the winners of the UEFA Cup Winners' Cup, as the tournament was discontinued after the 1998–99 season. Since 2000, it has been contested by the winners of the UEFA Champions League and the winners of the UEFA Cup/UEFA Europa League.

== Venue ==
The Stade Louis II in Monaco has been the venue for the UEFA Super Cup since 1998. It was inaugurated in 1985, and is also the home of AS Monaco, who play in the French league system.

== Teams ==
Team	Qualification	Previous participation (bold indicates winners)
(England) Manchester United	1998–99 UEFA Champions League winners	**1991**
(Italy) Lazio	1998–99 UEFA Cup Winners' Cup winners	None

== Match ==
=== Summary ===
Lazio scored the only goal of the game in the 35th minute when Marcelo Salas hit a shot from just inside the penalty box which goalkeeper Raimond van der Gouw got his hand to but failed to keep out as the ball went under his body.

=== Details ===
27 August 1999
20:45 CEST

Manchester United (England)	0–1	(Italy) Lazio
	Report	Salas 35'

Stade Louis II, Monaco
Attendance: 14,461
Referee: Ryszard Wójcik (Poland)

**Manchester United**	**Lazio**

GK	17	(Netherlands) Raimond van der Gouw
RB	2	(England) Gary Neville
CB	6	(Netherlands) Jaap Stam	(substituted off) 57'
CB	21	(Norway) Henning Berg
LB	12	(England) Phil Neville
RM	7	(England) David Beckham	(substituted off) 58'
CM	16	(Republic of Ireland) Roy Keane (c)
LM	18	(England) Paul Scholes
RF	9	(England) Andy Cole	(substituted off) 78'
CF	10	(England) Teddy Sheringham
LF	20	(Norway) Ole Gunnar Solskjær
Substitutes:
GK	31	(England) Nick Culkin
DF	13	(England) John Curtis	(substituted on) 57'
MF	11	(Wales) Ryan Giggs
MF	33	(England) Mark Wilson
MF	34	(England) Jonathan Greening	(substituted on) 78'
FW	14	(Netherlands) Jordi Cruyff	(substituted on) 58'
FW	19	(Trinidad and Tobago) Dwight Yorke
Manager:
(Scotland) Sir Alex Ferguson

GK	1	(Italy) Luca Marchegiani
RB	2	(Italy) Paolo Negro
CB	13	(Italy) Alessandro Nesta (c)
CB	11	(Federal Republic of Yugoslavia) Siniša Mihajlović
LB	15	(Italy) Giuseppe Pancaro
RM	20	(Federal Republic of Yugoslavia) Dejan Stanković
CM	23	(Argentina) Juan Sebastián Verón
CM	25	(Argentina) Matías Almeyda
LM	18	(Czech Republic) Pavel Nedvěd	(substituted off) 66'
SS	10	(Italy) Roberto Mancini	(substituted off) 84'
CF	21	(Italy) Simone Inzaghi	(substituted off) 23'
Substitutes:
GK	22	(Italy) Marco Ballotta
DF	5	(Italy) Giuseppe Favalli
MF	7	(Portugal) Sérgio Conceição
MF	14	(Argentina) Diego Simeone	(substituted on) 84'
MF	16	(Italy) Attilio Lombardo	(substituted on) 66'
FW	9	(Chile) Marcelo Salas	(substituted on) 23'
FW	19	(Sweden) Kennet Andersson
Manager:
(Sweden) Sven-Göran Eriksson

Man of the Match:
Juan Sebastián Verón (Lazio)

Assistant referees:
Jacek Pocięgiel (Poland)
Eugeniusz Koczar (Poland)
Fourth official:
Tomasz Mikulski (Poland)

**Match rules**

- 90 minutes
- 30 minutes of golden goal extra time if necessary
- Penalty shoot-out if scores still level
- Seven named substitutes
- Maximum of three substitutions

== See also ==
- 1998–99 UEFA Champions League
- 1998–99 UEFA Cup Winners' Cup
- 1999–2000 SS Lazio season
- 1999–2000 Manchester United F.C. season
- Manchester United F.C. in international football
- SS Lazio in European football
