= FC Barcelona in international football =

Spanish club in international football

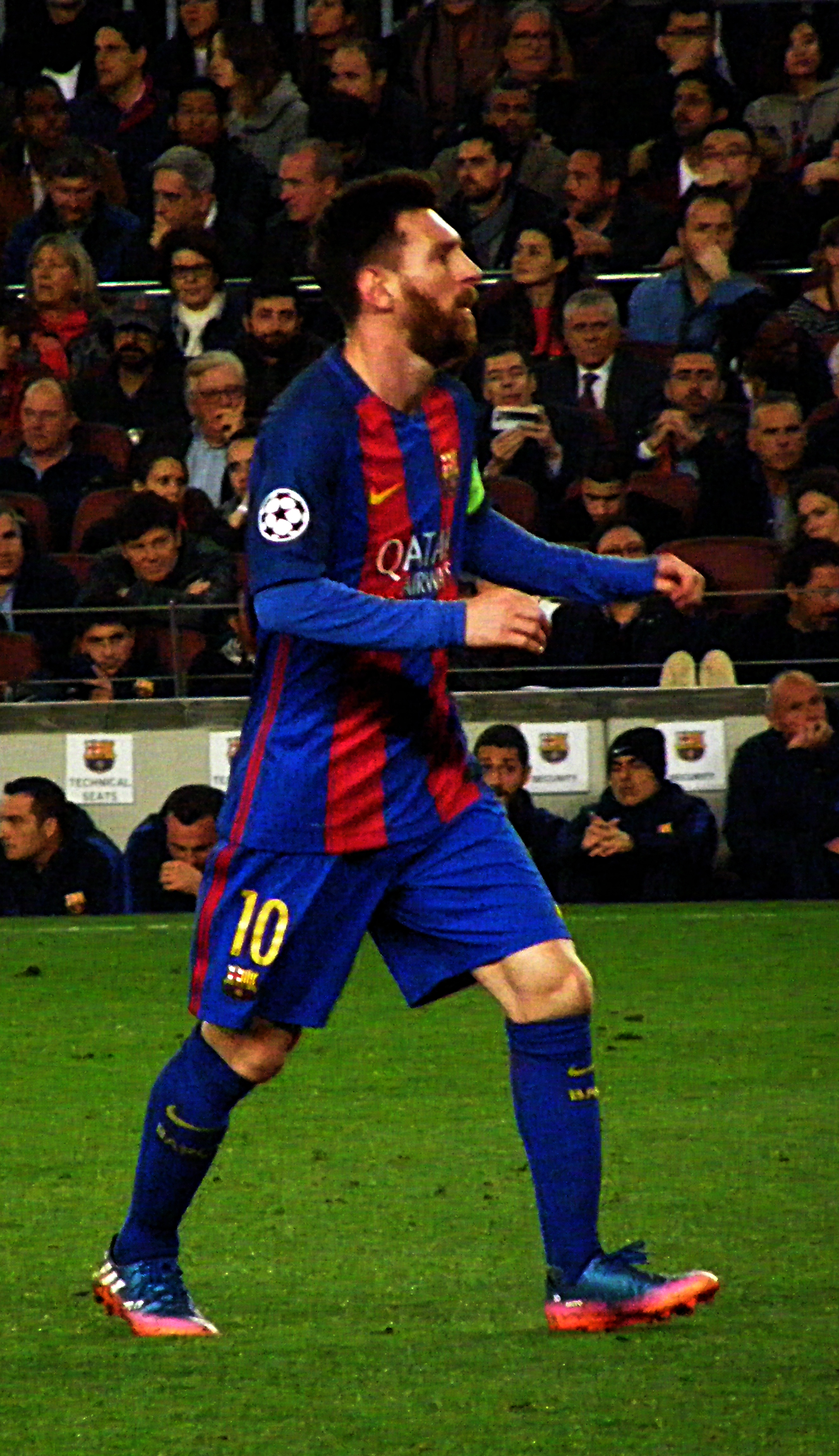
- Lionel Messi is the top goalscorer for Barcelona in international competitions.
- Club: FC Barcelona
- Seasons played: 71
- Most appearances: Xavi (173)
- Top scorer: Lionel Messi (128)
- First entry: 1955–58 Inter-Cities Fairs Cup
- Latest entry: 2026–27 UEFA Champions League

Titles
- Champions League: 5: 1992; 2006; 2009; 2011; 2015
- Cup Winners' Cup: 4: 1979; 1982; 1989; 1997
- Super Cup: 5: 1992; 1997; 2009; 2011; 2015
- FIFA Club World Cup: 3: 2009; 2011; 2015
- Inter-Cities Fairs Cup: 3: 1955–58; 1958–60; 1965–66

Futbol Club Barcelona is a Spanish professional football club based in Barcelona. The club first participated in a European competition in 1910, and from 1955 onwards spent every season in one or more European competitions. The first international cup they took part in was the Pyrenees Cup. The competition lasted from 1910 to 1914 and Barcelona won four out of five editions. From 1914 to the beginning of the Latin Cup in 1949, Barcelona did not participate in any international competitions. From the 1955–56 season onward, with the exception of 1956–57 (during the first Fairs Cup, because a Vienna XI withdrew from the competition), they are the only team to have played in the European competitions every year to date.

Barcelona has won the now defunct Cup Winners' Cup four times and Inter-Cities Fairs Cup three times, both tournament records. They also took part in the Latin Cup twice as champions of Spain, winning on both occasions, a record shared with Real Madrid and Milan. Though they did not manage to win the premier European Cup, now the UEFA Champions League, during the early decades of the competition, they have since won the trophy five times, with their first triumph in 1992.

Barcelona is second in the ranking of Europe's most successful clubs in terms of number of official international trophies won, behind Real Madrid. With the 2015 UEFA Super Cup victory in Tbilisi against Sevilla and the 2015 FIFA Club World Cup victory in Yokohama against River Plate, the Catalans raised their trophy haul to 22 international titles. In the tables, "(H)" denotes home ground, "(A)" denotes away ground and "(N)" symbolises neutral ground. The first score is always Barcelona's.

== Overall record ==
As of 20 October 2026. Legend: GF = Goals For. GA = Goals Against. GD = Goal Difference.

Barcelona has won 22 international trophies, placing second in the all-time ranking after Real Madrid (35).

Competition	Played	Won	Drew	Lost	GF	GA	GD	Win%
European Cup / Champions League	378	221	81	76	773	407	+366	58.47
Cup Winners' Cup	85	50	18	17	178	87	+91	58.82
Fairs Cup	71	36	17	18	143	86	+57	50.70
UEFA Cup / Europa League	86	42	21	23	162	87	+75	48.84
Super Cup	14	6	4	4	17	17	+0	42.86
Latin Cup	4	4	0	0	12	3	+9	100.00
Intercontinental Cup / Club World Cup	9	7	0	2	24	5	+19	77.78
Total	647	366	141	140	1,309	691	+618	56.57

Historical progression by competition
Knockout stage win Knockout stage lost Group stage / league phase – Highest-ranked eliminated team Group stage / league phase – Lowest-ranked qualified team
Intercontinental Cup
Edition							Final
1992							(Brazil) São Paulo
Club World Cup
Edition						Semi-finals	Final / 3rd pos.
2006						(Mexico) América	(Brazil) Internacional
2009						(Mexico) Atlante	(Argentina) Estudiantes
2011						(Qatar) Al Sadd	(Brazil) Santos
2015						(China) Evergrande	(Argentina) River Plate
Super Cup
Edition							Final
1979							(England) Forest
1982							(England) Villa
1989							(Italy) Milan
1992							(Germany) W. Bremen
1997							(Germany) Dortmund
2006							(Spain) Sevilla
2009							(Ukraine) Shakhtar
2011							(Portugal) Porto
2015							(Spain) Sevilla
European Cup / Champions League
Season	Preliminary stages		Round of 32	Round of 16	Quarter-finals	Semi-finals	Final
1959–60		(Bulgaria) CSKA Sofia		(Italy) Milan	(England) Wolverhampton	(Spain) R. Madrid	
1960–61		(Belgium) Lierse		(Spain) R. Madrid	(Czechoslovakia) Hradec Králové	(West Germany) Hamburg	(Portugal) Benfica
1974–75			(Austria) VÖEST Linz	(Netherlands) Feyenoord	(Sweden) Åtvidaberg	(England) Leeds	
1985–86			(Czechoslovakia) Sparta Prague	(Portugal) Porto	(Italy) Juventus	(Sweden) Göteborg	(Romania) Steaua
1991–92			(East Germany) Hansa	(West Germany) 1. FC Kaiserslautern	(Czechoslovakia) Sparta Prague	Not played	(Italy) Sampdoria
1992–93			(Norway) Viking	(Russia) CSKA Moscow			
1993–94			(Ukraine) Dynamo Kyiv	Austria Wien	(Russia) Spartak Moscow	(Portugal) Porto	(Italy) Milan
1994–95				(England) Man. United	(France) PSG		
1997–98		(Latvia) Skonto		(Ukraine) Dynamo Kyiv			
1998–99				(England) Man. United			
1999–2000			(England) Arsenal	(Czech Republic) Sparta Prague	(England) Chelsea	(Spain) Valencia	
2000–01			(England) Leeds				
2001–02		(Poland) Wisła	(France) Lyon	(Italy) Roma	(Greece) Panathinaikos	(Spain) R. Madrid	
2002–03		(Poland) Legia	(Belgium) Club Brugge	(England) Newcastle	(Italy) Juventus		
2004–05			(Ukraine) Shakhtar	(England) Chelsea			
2005–06			(Italy) Udinese	(England) Chelsea	(Portugal) Benfica	(Italy) Milan	(England) Arsenal
2006–07			(Germany) W. Bremen	(England) Liverpool			
2007–08			(Scotland) Rangers	(Scotland) Celtic	(Germany) Schalke	(England) Man. United	
2008–09		(Poland) Wisła	(Ukraine) Shakhtar	(France) Lyon	(Germany) Bayern	(England) Chelsea	(England) Man. United
2009–10			(Russia) Rubin	(Germany) Stuttgart	(England) Arsenal	(Italy) Inter Milan	
2010–11			(Russia) Rubin	(England) Arsenal	(Ukraine) Shakhtar	(Spain) R. Madrid	(England) Man. United
2011–12			(Czech Republic) Viktoria Plzeň	(Germany) Leverkusen	(Italy) Milan	(England) Chelsea	
2012–13			(Portugal) Benfica	(Italy) Milan	(France) PSG	(Germany) Bayern	
2013–14			(Netherlands) Ajax	(England) Man. City	(Spain) Atlético		
2014–15			(Netherlands) Ajax	(England) Man. City	(France) PSG	(Germany) Bayern	(Italy) Juventus
2015–16			(Germany) Leverkusen	(England) Arsenal	(Spain) Atlético		
2016–17			(Germany) Borussia M.	(France) PSG	(Italy) Juventus		
2017–18			(Portugal) Sporting CP	(England) Chelsea	(Italy) Roma		
2018–19			(Italy) Inter Milan	(France) Lyon	(England) Man. United	(England) Liverpool	
2019–20			(Italy) Inter Milan	(Italy) Napoli	(Germany) Bayern		
2020–21			(Ukraine) Dynamo Kyiv	(France) PSG			
2021–22			(Portugal) Benfica				
2022–23			(Italy) Inter Milan				
2023–24			(Ukraine) Shakhtar	(Italy) Napoli	(France) PSG		
2024–25			(Croatia) Dinamo Zagreb	(Portugal) Benfica	(Germany) Dortmund	(Italy) Inter Milan	
2025–26			(France) Marseille	(England) Newcastle	(Spain) Atlético		
Cup Winners' Cup
Season			Round of 32	Round of 16	Quarter-finals	Semi-finals	Final
1963–64			(Republic of Ireland) Shelbourne	(West Germany) Hamburg			
1968–69			(Switzerland) Lugano	Bye	(Norway) Lyn Oslo	(West Germany) Köln	(Czechoslovakia) Slovan B.
1971–72			(Northern Ireland) Distillery	(Romania) Steaua			
1978–79			(Soviet Union) Shakhtar	(Belgium) Anderlecht	(England) Ipswich	(Belgium) Beveren	(West Germany) Fortuna
1979–80			(Iceland) ÍA	(Luxembourg) Aris	(Spain) Valencia		
1981–82			(Bulgaria) Botev	(Czechoslovakia) Dukla	(East Germany) Lokomotive	(England) Tottenham	(Belgium) Standard
1982–83			(Cyprus) Apollon	(Socialist Federal Republic of Yugoslavia) Red Star Belgrade	Austria Wien		
1983–84			(East Germany) Magdeburg	(Netherlands) NEC	(England) Man. United		
1984–85			(France) Metz				
1988–89			(Iceland) Fram	(Poland) Lech	(Denmark) AGF	(Bulgaria) CSKA Sofia	(Italy) Sampdoria
1989–90			(Poland) Legia	(Belgium) Anderlecht			
1990–91			(Turkey) Trabzonspor	(Iceland) Fram	(Soviet Union) Dynamo Kyiv	(Italy) Juventus	(England) Man. United
1996–97			(Cyprus) AEK Larnaca	(Serbia and Montenegro) Red Star Belgrade	(Sweden) AIK	(Italy) Fiorentina	(France) PSG
Fairs Cup
Season	Round of 64		Round of 32	Round of 16	Quarter-finals	Semi-finals	Final / Trophy Playoff
1955–58					(Denmark) Stævnet	(England) Birmingham	(England) London XI
1958–60				(Switzerland) Basel XI	(Italy) Inter Milan	(Socialist Federal Republic of Yugoslavia) Belgrade XI	(England) Birmingham
1960–61				(Socialist Federal Republic of Yugoslavia) Zagreb XI	(Scotland) Hibernian		
1961–62			(West Germany) West Berlin XI	(Socialist Federal Republic of Yugoslavia) Dinamo Zagreb	(England) Wednesday	(Socialist Federal Republic of Yugoslavia) Red Star Belgrade	(Spain) Valencia
1962–63			(Portugal) Belenenses	(Socialist Federal Republic of Yugoslavia) Red Star Belgrade			
1964–65		(Italy) Fiorentina	(Scotland) Celtic	(France) Strasbourg			
1965–66		(Netherlands) Utrecht	(Belgium) Antwerp	(West Germany) Hannover	(Spain) Espanyol	(England) Chelsea	(Spain) Zaragoza
1966–67			(Scotland) Dundee U.				
1967–68		(Switzerland) Zürich					
1969–70		(Denmark) B 1913	(Hungary) Győr	(Italy) Inter Milan			
1970–71		(Poland) Katowice	(Italy) Juventus				
Trophy Play-Off							(England) Leeds
UEFA Cup / Europa League
Season	Round of 128	Round of 64	Round of 32	Round of 16	Quarter-finals	Semi-finals	Final
1972–73		(Portugal) Porto					
1973–74		(France) Nice					
1975–76		(Greece) PAOK	(Italy) Lazio	(Hungary) Vasas	(Bulgaria) Levski Sofia	(England) Liverpool	
1976–77		(Portugal) Belenenses	(Belgium) Lokeren	(Sweden) Öster	(Spain) Athletic Bilbao		
1977–78		(Romania) Steaua	(Netherlands) AZ	(England) Ipswich	(England) Villa	(Netherlands) PSV	
1980–81		(Malta) Sliema	(West Germany) Köln				
1986–87		(Albania) Flamurtari	(Portugal) Sporting CP	(West Germany) Uerdingen	(Scotland) Dundee United		
1987–88		(Portugal) Belenenses	(Soviet Union) Dynamo Moscow	(Albania) Flamurtari	(West Germany) Leverkusen		
1995–96		(Israel) Hapoel Be'er Sheva	(Portugal) Vitória Guimarães	(Spain) Sevilla	(Netherlands) PSV	(Germany) Bayern	
2000–01			(Belgium) Club Brugge	(Greece) AEK Athens	(Spain) Celta	(England) Liverpool	
2003–04	(Slovakia) Púchov	(Greece) Panionios	(Denmark) Brøndby	(Scotland) Celtic			
2021–22			(Italy) Napoli	(Turkey) Galatasaray	(Germany) Eintracht Frankfurt		
2022–23			(England) Man. United				

== Pyrenees Cup ==
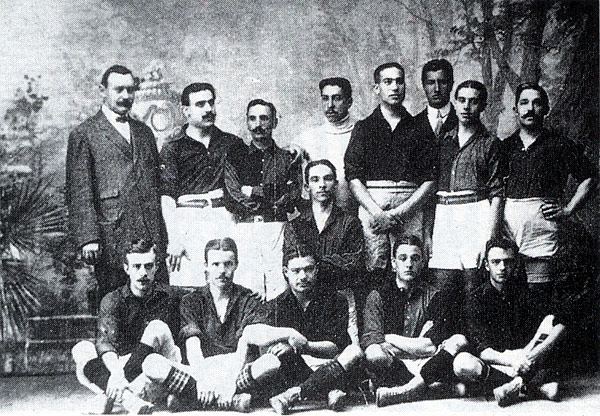
FC Barcelona's 1910 squad, victors in the inaugural Pyrenees Cup.

Barcelona began to play friendly games against teams from the neighbouring regions in France in 1904. Club president Arthur Witty organised the club's first trip abroad, which resulted in their first game against a non-Spanish team. On 1 May 1904, Barcelona defeated the French team Stade Olympien des Étudiants Toulousains.

By 1910, the international friendlies evolved into the Pyrenees Cup, a competition featuring teams from Languedoc, Le Midi, Aquitaine, Catalonia, and the Basque Country. At that time it was considered the finest competition open for participation. Five editions were played in total, with FC Barcelona winning four consecutive trophies from 1910 to 1913.

Year	Opposing team	Score	City
1910	(Spain) Real Sociedad	2–1	Sète, France
1911	(France) Gars de Bordeaux	4–2	Toulouse, France
1912	(France) Stade Bordelais UC	5–3	Toulouse, France
1913	(France) Comète Simot	7–2	Barcelona, Spain

== Latin Cup ==
In 1949, the football federations of Spain, Italy, France, and Portugal, came together and launched their own club competition, the Latin Cup, which was staged at the end of every season in a single host country. The competition featured two semi-finals, a third place play-off and a final. As La Liga champions in 1949, Barça represented Spain in the inaugural competition. They beat Reims 5–0 in their semi-final at Les Corts, before beating Sporting CP 2–1 in the final at the Estadio Chamartín. Barça also played in and won the 1952 competition in Paris, beating Juventus 4–2 in the semi-final and then Nice 1–0 in the final. After the introduction of the European Cup, the Latin Cup was gradually discontinued and nowadays, while it is not considered an official tournament by UEFA, it is recognized by FIFA.

Year	Round	Opposing team	Score
1949	Semi-final	(France) Reims	5–0 (H)
1949	Final	(Portugal) Sporting CP	2–1 (N)
1952	Semi-final	(Italy) Juventus	4–2 (N)
1952	Final	(France) Nice	1–0 (N)

== European Cup / Champions League ==
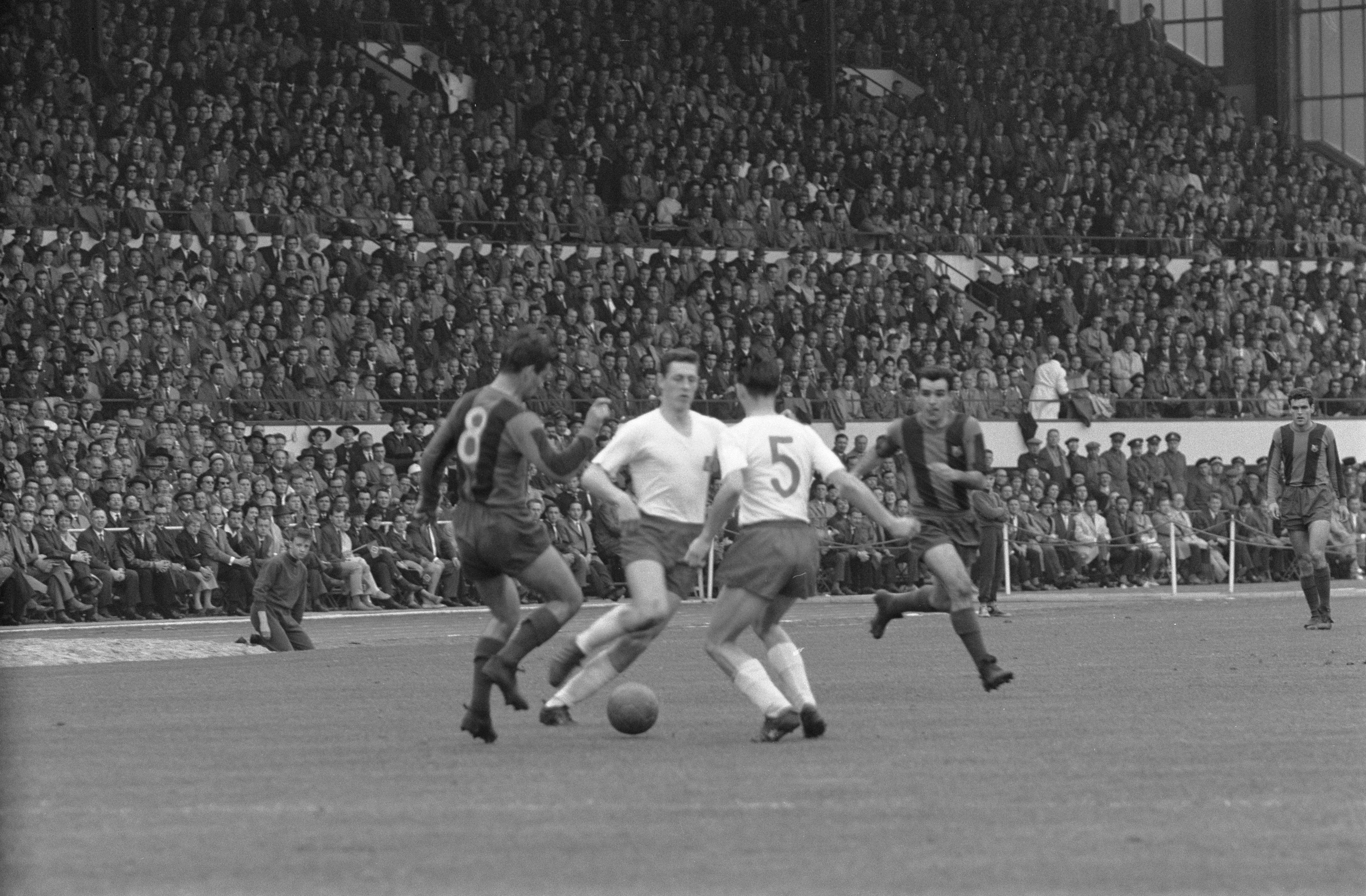
Barcelona against Hamburger SV in 1961

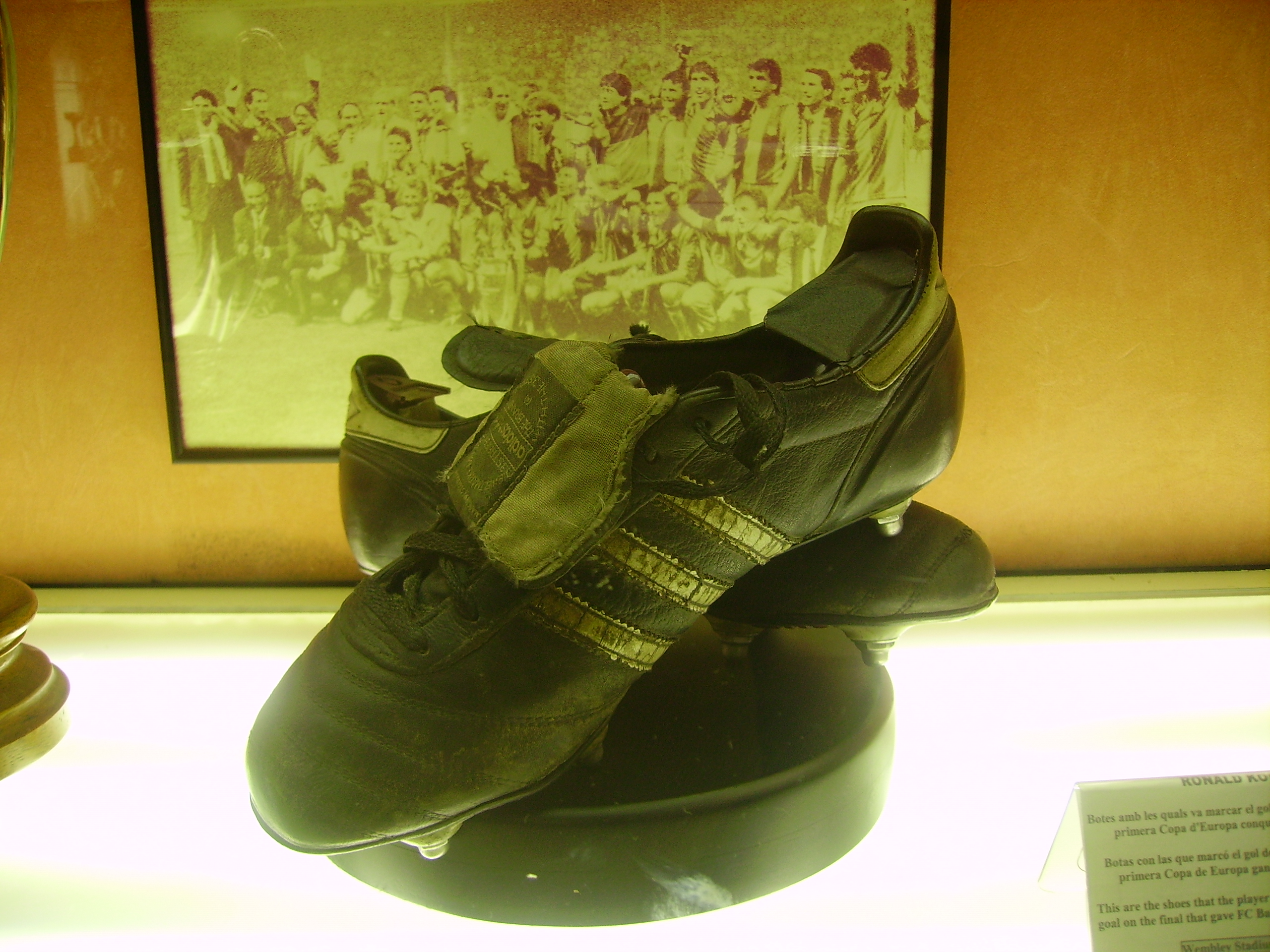
Ronald Koeman's boots from the 1992 European Cup final, an exhibit at the FC Barcelona Museum

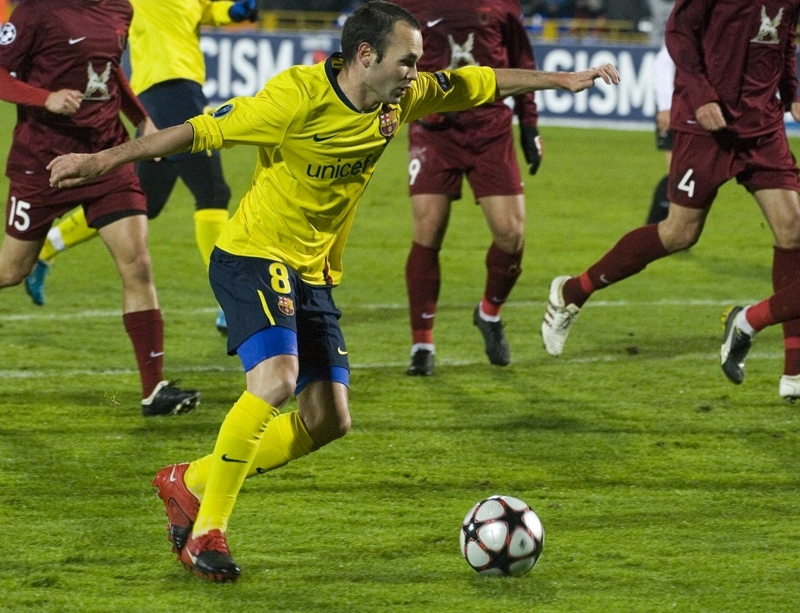
Andrés Iniesta against Rubin Kazan in the 2009–10 Champions League

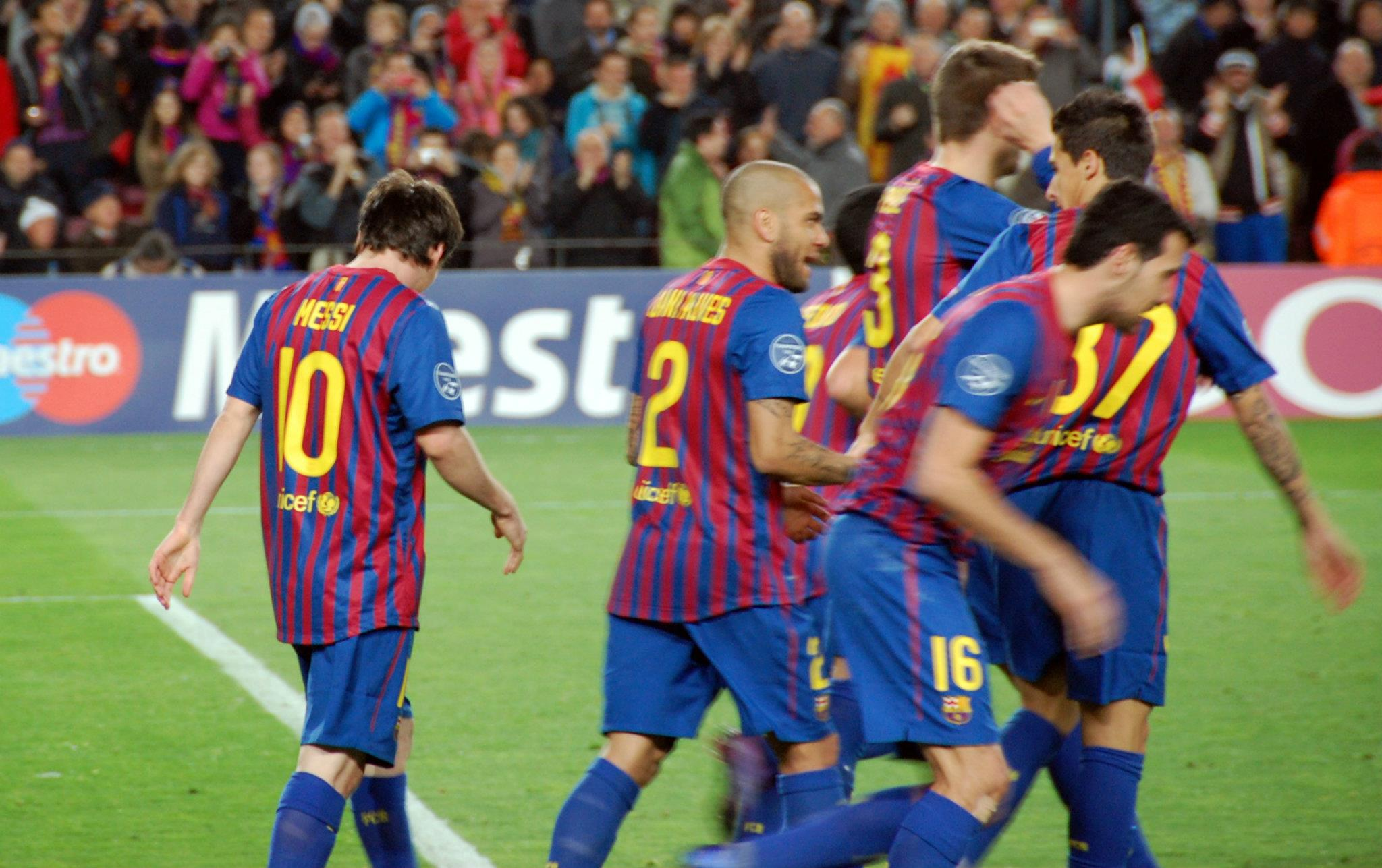
Barcelona against Bayer Leverkusen in 2012

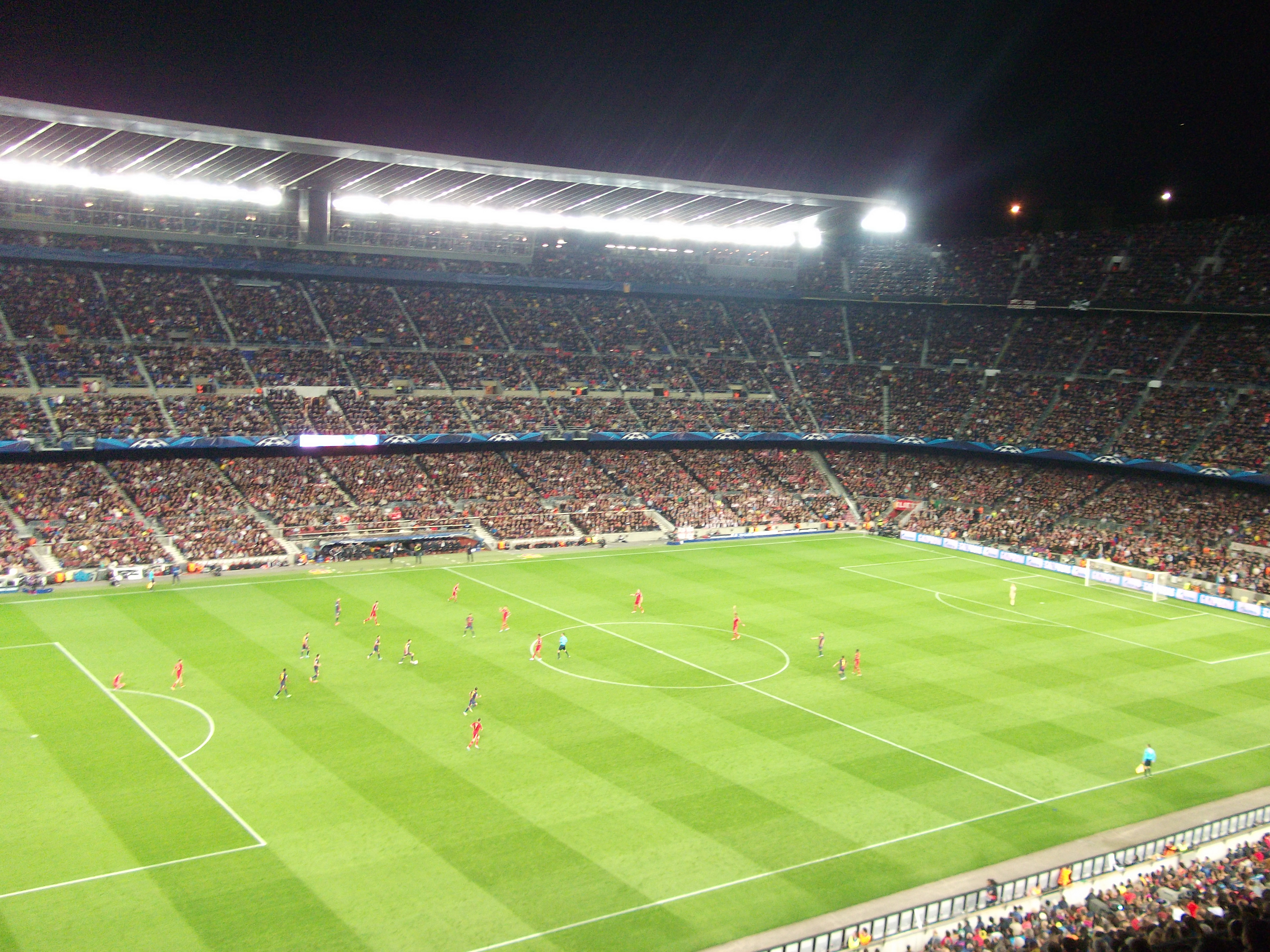
Barcelona against Bayern Munich in 2013

The European Cup was inaugurated in 1955, with Barcelona's arch-rivals Real Madrid winning the first five editions. In 1959, Barcelona entered this competition for the first time, after winning the 1958–59 La Liga season. Until the 1990s, the club had little success, apart from their runner-up places in 1961 and 1986. In 1992, Johan Cruyff's Dream Team won their first European Cup with a 1–0 win against Sampdoria. Since then, Barcelona has won the competition four additional times, in 2006, 2009, 2011 and 2015, and has established itself as one of the strongest sides in European competition, when measured in UEFA coefficients.

Season	Round	Opposing team	Score	Notes
1959–60	Preliminary round	(Bulgaria) CSKA Sofia	2–2 (A), 6–2 (H)	
1959–60	First round	(Italy) Milan	2–0 (A), 5–1 (H)	
1959–60	Quarter-final	(England) Wolverhampton Wanderers	4–0 (H), 5–2 (A)	
1959–60	Semi-final	(Spain) Real Madrid	1–3 (A), 1–3 (H)	
1960–61	Preliminary round	(Belgium) Lierse	2–0 (H), 3–0 (A)	
1960–61	First round	(Spain) Real Madrid	2–2 (A), 2–1 (H)	
1960–61	Quarter-final	(Czechoslovakia) Hradec Králové	4–0 (H), 1–1 (A)	
1960–61	Semi-final	(Germany) Hamburger SV	1–0 (H), 1–2 (A), 1–0 (N)	^{[O]}
1960–61	Final	(Portugal) Benfica	2–3 (N)	
1974–75	First round	(Austria) Linz	0–0 (A), 5–0 (H)	
1974–75	Second round	(Netherlands) Feyenoord	0–0 (A), 3–0 (H)	
1974–75	Quarter-final	(Sweden) Åtvidabergs FF	2–0 (H), 3–0 (A)	
1974–75	Semi-final	(England) Leeds United	1–2 (A), 1–1 (H)	
1985–86	First round	(Czechoslovakia) Sparta Prague	2–1 (A), 0–1 (H)	^{[A]}
1985–86	Second round	(Portugal) Porto	2–0 (H), 1–3 (A)	^{[A]}
1985–86	Quarter-final	(Italy) Juventus	1–0 (H), 1–1 (A)	
1985–86	Semi-final	(Sweden) IFK Göteborg	0–3 (A), 3–0 (H)	^{[D]}
1985–86	Final	(Romania) Steaua București	0–0 (N)	^{[E]}
1991–92	First round	(East Germany) Hansa Rostock	3–0 (H), 0–1 (A)	
1991–92	Second round	(Germany) 1. FC Kaiserslautern	2–0 (H), 1–3 (A)	^{[A]}
1991–92	Group B	(Czechoslovakia) Sparta Prague	3–2 (H), 0–1 (A)	
1991–92	Group B	(Portugal) Benfica	0–0 (A), 2–1 (H)	
1991–92	Group B	(Soviet Union) Dynamo Kyiv	2–0 (A), 3–0 (H)	
1991–92	Final	(Italy) Sampdoria	1–0 (N)	
1992–93	First round	(Norway) Viking	1–0 (H), 0–0 (A)	
1992–93	Second round	(Russia) CSKA Moscow	1–1 (A), 2–3 (H)	
1993–94	First round	(Ukraine) Dynamo Kyiv	1–3 (A), 4–1 (H)	
1993–94	Second round	Austria Wien	3–0 (H), 2–1 (A)	
1993–94	Group A	(Turkey) Galatasaray	0–0 (A), 3–0 (H)	
1993–94	Group A	(France) Monaco	2–0 (H), 1–0 (A)	
1993–94	Group A	(Russia) Spartak Moscow	2–2 (A), 5–1 (H)	
1993–94	Semi-final	(Portugal) Porto	3–0 (H)	
1993–94	Final	(Italy) Milan	0–4 (N)	
1994–95	Group A	(Turkey) Galatasaray	2–1 (H), 1–2 (A)	
1994–95	Group A	(Sweden) IFK Göteborg	1–2 (A), 1–1 (H)	
1994–95	Group A	(England) Manchester United	2–2 (A), 4–0 (H)	
1994–95	Quarter-final	(France) Paris Saint-Germain	1–1 (H), 1–2 (A)	
1997–98	Second Qualifying round	(Latvia) Skonto	3–2 (H), 1–0 (A)	
1997–98	Group C	(England) Newcastle United	2–3 (A), 1–0 (H)	
1997–98	Group C	(Netherlands) PSV Eindhoven	2–2 (H), 2–2 (A)	
1997–98	Group C	(Ukraine) Dynamo Kyiv	0–3 (A), 0–4 (H)	
1998–99	Group D	(England) Manchester United	3–3 (A), 3–3 (H)	
1998–99	Group D	(Denmark) Brøndby	2–0 (H), 2–0 (A)	
1998–99	Group D	(Germany) Bayern Munich	0–1 (A), 1–2 (H)	
1999–2000	Group B	(Sweden) AIK	2–1 (A), 5–0 (H)	
1999–2000	Group B	(Italy) Fiorentina	4–2 (H), 3–3 (A)	
1999–2000	Group B	(England) Arsenal	1–1 (H), 4–2 (A)	
1999–2000	Group A second stage	(Germany) Hertha BSC	1–1 (A), 3–1 (H)	
1999–2000	Group A second stage	(Czech Republic) Sparta Prague	5–0 (H), 2–1 (A)	
1999–2000	Group A second stage	(Portugal) Porto	4–2 (H), 2–0 (A)	
1999–2000	Quarter-final	(England) Chelsea	1–3 (A), 5–1 (H)	
1999–2000	Semi-final	(Spain) Valencia	1–4 (A), 2–1 (H)	
2000–01	Group H	(England) Leeds United	4–0 (H), 1–1 (A)	
2000–01	Group H	(Turkey) Beşiktaş	0–3 (A), 5–0 (H)	
2000–01	Group H	(Italy) Milan	0–2 (H), 3–3 (A)	
2001–02	Third Qualifying round	(Poland) Wisła Kraków	4–3 (A), 1–0 (H)	
2001–02	Group F	(Turkey) Fenerbahçe	3–0 (A), 1–0 (H)	
2001–02	Group F	(Germany) Bayer Leverkusen	1–2 (A), 2–1 (H)	
2001–02	Group F	(France) Lyon	2–0 (H), 3–2 (A)	
2001–02	Group B second stage	(England) Liverpool	3–1 (A), 0–0 (H)	
2001–02	Group B second stage	(Turkey) Galatasaray	2–2 (H), 1–0 (A)	
2001–02	Group B second stage	(Italy) Roma	1–1 (H), 0–3 (A)	
2001–02	Quarter-final	(Greece) Panathinaikos	0–1 (A), 3–1 (H)	
2001–02	Semi-final	(Spain) Real Madrid	0–2 (H), 1–1 (A)	
2002–03	Third Qualifying round	(Poland) Legia Warsaw	3–0 (H), 1–0 (A)	
2002–03	Group H	(Belgium) Club Brugge	3–2 (H), 1–0 (A)	
2002–03	Group H	(Turkey) Galatasaray	2–0 (A), 3–1 (H)	
2002–03	Group H	(Russia) Lokomotiv Moscow	3–1 (A), 1–0 (H)	
2002–03	Group A second stage	(Germany) Bayer Leverkusen	2–1 (A), 2–0 (H)	
2002–03	Group A second stage	(England) Newcastle United	3–1 (H), 2–0 (A)	
2002–03	Group A second stage	(Italy) Internazionale	3–0 (H), 0–0 (A)	
2002–03	Quarter-final	(Italy) Juventus	1–1 (A), 1–2 (H)	
2004–05	Group F	(Scotland) Celtic	3–1 (A), 1–1 (H)	
2004–05	Group F	(Ukraine) Shakhtar Donetsk	3–0 (H), 0–2 (A)	
2004–05	Group F	(Italy) Milan	0–1 (A), 2–1 (H)	
2004–05	Round of 16	(England) Chelsea	2–1 (H), 2–4 (A)	
2005–06	Group C	(Germany) Werder Bremen	2–0 (A), 3–1 (H)	
2005–06	Group C	(Italy) Udinese	4–1 (H), 2–0 (A)	
2005–06	Group C	(Greece) Panathinaikos	0–0 (A), 5–0 (H)	
2005–06	Round of 16	(England) Chelsea	2–1 (A), 1–1 (H)	
2005–06	Quarter-final	(Portugal) Benfica	0–0 (A), 2–0 (H)	
2005–06	Semi-final	(Italy) Milan	1–0 (A), 0–0 (H)	
2005–06	Final	(England) Arsenal	2–1 (N)	
2006–07	Group A	(Bulgaria) Levski Sofia	5–0 (H), 2–0 (A)	
2006–07	Group A	(Germany) Werder Bremen	1–1 (A), 2–0 (H)	
2006–07	Group A	(England) Chelsea	0–1 (A), 2–2 (H)	
2006–07	Round of 16	(England) Liverpool	1–2 (H), 1–0 (A)	^{[B]}
2007–08	Group E	(France) Lyon	3–0 (H), 2–2 (A)	
2007–08	Group E	(Germany) VfB Stuttgart	2–0 (A), 3–1 (H)	
2007–08	Group E	(Scotland) Rangers	0–0 (A), 2–0 (H)	
2007–08	Round of 16	(Scotland) Celtic	3–2 (A), 1–0 (H)	
2007–08	Quarter-final	(Germany) Schalke 04	1–0 (A), 1–0 (H)	
2007–08	Semi-final	(England) Manchester United	0–0 (H), 0–1 (A)	
2008–09	Third Qualifying round	(Poland) Wisła Kraków	4–0 (H), 0–1 (A)	
2008–09	Group C	(Portugal) Sporting CP	3–1 (H), 5–2 (A)	
2008–09	Group C	(Ukraine) Shakhtar Donetsk	2–1 (A), 2–3 (H)	
2008–09	Group C	(Switzerland) Basel	5–0 (A), 1–1 (H)	
2008–09	Round of 16	(France) Lyon	1–1 (A), 5–2 (H)	
2008–09	Quarter-final	(Germany) Bayern Munich	4–0 (H), 1–1 (A)	
2008–09	Semi-final	(England) Chelsea	0–0 (H), 1–1 (A)	^{[A]}
2008–09	Final	(England) Manchester United	2–0 (N)	
2009–10	Group F	(Italy) Internazionale	0–0 (A), 2–0 (H)	
2009–10	Group F	(Ukraine) Dynamo Kyiv	2–0 (H), 2–1 (A)	
2009–10	Group F	(Russia) Rubin Kazan	1–2 (H), 0–0 (A)	
2009–10	Round of 16	(Germany) VfB Stuttgart	1–1 (A), 4–0 (H)	
2009–10	Quarter-final	(England) Arsenal	2–2 (A), 4–1 (H)	
2009–10	Semi-final	(Italy) Internazionale	1–3 (A), 1–0 (H)	
2010–11	Group D	(Denmark) Copenhagen	2–0 (H), 1–1 (A)	
2010–11	Group D	(Russia) Rubin Kazan	1–1 (A), 2–0 (H)	
2010–11	Group D	(Greece) Panathinaikos	5–1 (H), 3–0 (A)	
2010–11	Round of 16	(England) Arsenal	1–2 (A), 3–1 (H)	
2010–11	Quarter-final	(Ukraine) Shakhtar Donetsk	5–1 (H), 1–0 (A)	
2010–11	Semi-final	(Spain) Real Madrid	2–0 (A), 1–1 (H)	
2010–11	Final	(England) Manchester United	3–1 (N)	
2011–12	Group H	(Italy) Milan	2–2 (H), 3–2 (A)	
2011–12	Group H	(Belarus) BATE Borisov	5–0 (A), 4–0 (H)	
2011–12	Group H	(Czech Republic) Viktoria Plzeň	2–0 (H), 4–0 (A)	
2011–12	Round of 16	(Germany) Bayer Leverkusen	3–1 (A), 7–1 (H)	
2011–12	Quarter-final	(Italy) Milan	0–0 (A), 3–1 (H)	
2011–12	Semi-final	(England) Chelsea	0–1 (A), 2–2 (H)	
2012–13	Group G	(Russia) Spartak Moscow	3–2 (H), 3–0 (A)	
2012–13	Group G	(Portugal) Benfica	2–0 (A), 0–0 (H)	
2012–13	Group G	(Scotland) Celtic	2–1 (H), 1–2 (A)	
2012–13	Round of 16	(Italy) Milan	0–2 (A), 4–0 (H)	
2012–13	Quarter-final	(France) Paris Saint-Germain	2–2 (A), 1–1 (H)	^{[A]}
2012–13	Semi-final	(Germany) Bayern Munich	0–4 (A), 0–3 (H)	
2013–14	Group H	(Netherlands) Ajax	4–0 (H), 1–2 (A)	
2013–14	Group H	(Italy) Milan	1–1 (A), 3–1 (H)	
2013–14	Group H	(Scotland) Celtic	1–0 (A), 6–1 (H)	
2013–14	Round of 16	(England) Manchester City	2–0 (A), 2–1 (H)	
2013–14	Quarter-final	(Spain) Atlético Madrid	1–1 (H), 0–1 (A)	
2014–15	Group F	(Cyprus) APOEL	1–0 (H), 4–0 (A)	
2014–15	Group F	(France) Paris Saint-Germain	2–3 (A), 3–1 (H)	
2014–15	Group F	(Netherlands) Ajax	3–1 (H), 2–0 (A)	
2014–15	Round of 16	(England) Manchester City	2–1 (A), 1–0 (H)	
2014–15	Quarter-final	(France) Paris Saint Germain	3–1 (A), 2–0 (H)	
2014–15	Semi-final	(Germany) Bayern Munich	3–0 (H), 2–3 (A)	
2014–15	Final	(Italy) Juventus	3–1 (N)	
2015–16	Group E	(Italy) Roma	1–1 (A), 6–1 (H)	
2015–16	Group E	(Germany) Bayer Leverkusen	2–1 (H), 1–1 (A)	
2015–16	Group E	(Belarus) BATE Borisov	2–0 (A), 3–0 (H)	
2015–16	Round of 16	(England) Arsenal	2–0 (A), 3–1 (H)	
2015–16	Quarter-final	(Spain) Atlético Madrid	2–1 (H), 0–2 (A)	
2016–17	Group C	(Scotland) Celtic	7–0 (H), 2–0 (A)	
2016–17	Group C	(Germany) Borussia Mönchengladbach	4–0 (H), 2–1 (A)	
2016–17	Group C	(England) Manchester City	4–0 (H), 1–3 (A)	
2016–17	Round of 16	(France) Paris Saint Germain	0–4 (A), 6–1 (H)	
2016–17	Quarter-final	(Italy) Juventus	0–3 (A), 0–0 (H)	
2017–18	Group D	(Italy) Juventus	3–0 (H), 0–0 (A)	
2017–18	Group D	(Portugal) Sporting CP	1–0 (A), 2–0 (H)	
2017–18	Group D	(Greece) Olympiacos	3–1 (H), 0–0 (A)	
2017–18	Round of 16	(England) Chelsea	1–1 (A), 3–0 (H)	
2017–18	Quarter-final	(Italy) Roma	4–1 (H), 0–3 (A)	^{[B]}
2018–19	Group B	(Netherlands) PSV Eindhoven	4–0 (H), 2–1 (A)	
2018–19	Group B	(England) Tottenham Hotspur	4–2 (A), 1–1 (H)	
2018–19	Group B	(Italy) Internazionale	2–0 (H), 1–1 (A)	
2018–19	Round of 16	(France) Lyon	0–0 (A), 5–1 (H)	
2018–19	Quarter-final	(England) Manchester United	1–0 (A), 3–0 (H)	
2018–19	Semi-final	(England) Liverpool	3–0 (H), 0–4 (A)	
2019–20	Group F	(Germany) Borussia Dortmund	0–0 (A), 3–1 (H)	
2019–20	Group F	(Italy) Internazionale	2–1 (H), 2–1 (A)	
2019–20	Group F	(Czech Republic) Slavia Prague	2–1 (A), 0–0 (H)	
2019–20	Round of 16	(Italy) Napoli	1–1 (A), 3–1 (H)	
2019–20	Quarter-final	(Germany) Bayern Munich	2–8 (N)	
2020–21	Group G	(Hungary) Ferencváros	5–1 (H), 3–0 (A)	
2020–21	Group G	(Italy) Juventus	2–0 (A), 0–3 (H)	
2020–21	Group G	(Ukraine) Dynamo Kyiv	2–1 (H), 4–0 (A)	
2020–21	Round of 16	(France) Paris Saint-Germain	1–4 (H), 1–1 (A)	
2021–22	Group E	(Germany) Bayern Munich	0–3 (H), 0–3 (A)	
2021–22	Group E	(Portugal) Benfica	0–3 (A), 0–0 (H)	
2021–22	Group E	(Ukraine) Dynamo Kyiv	1–0 (H), 1–0 (A)	
2022–23	Group C	(Czech Republic) Viktoria Plzeň	5–1 (H), 4–2 (A)	
2022–23	Group C	(Germany) Bayern Munich	0–2 (A), 0–3 (H)	
2022–23	Group C	(Italy) Internazionale	0–1 (A), 3–3 (H)	
2023–24	Group H	(Belgium) Antwerp	5–0 (H), 2–3 (A)	
2023–24	Group H	(Portugal) Porto	1–0 (A), 2–1 (H)	
2023–24	Group H	(Ukraine) Shakhtar Donetsk	2–1 (H), 0–1 (A)	
2023–24	Round of 16	(Italy) Napoli	1–1 (A), 3–1 (H)	
2023–24	Quarter-final	(France) Paris Saint-Germain	3–2 (A), 1–4 (H)	
2024–25	League phase	(France) Monaco	1–2 (A)	
2024–25	League phase	(Switzerland) Young Boys	5–0 (H)	
2024–25	League phase	(Germany) Bayern Munich	4–1 (H)	
2024–25	League phase	(Serbia) Red Star Belgrade	5–2 (A)	
2024–25	League phase	(France) Brest	3–0 (H)	
2024–25	League phase	(Germany) Borussia Dortmund	3–2 (A)	
2024–25	League phase	(Portugal) Benfica	5–4 (A)	
2024–25	League phase	(Italy) Atalanta	2–2 (H)	
2024–25	Round of 16	(Portugal) Benfica	1–0 (A), 3–1 (H)	
2024–25	Quarter-final	(Germany) Borussia Dortmund	4–0 (H), 1–3 (A)	
2024–25	Semi-final	(Italy) Internazionale	3–3 (H), 3–4 (A)	
2025–26	League phase	(England) Newcastle United	2–1 (A)	
2025–26	League phase	(France) Paris Saint-Germain	1–2 (H)	
2025–26	League phase	(Greece) Olympiacos	6–1 (H)	
2025–26	League phase	(Belgium) Club Brugge	3–3 (A)	
2025–26	League phase	(England) Chelsea	0–3 (A)	
2025–26	League phase	(Germany) Eintracht Frankfurt	2–1 (H)	
2025–26	League phase	(Czech Republic) Slavia Prague	4–2 (A)	
2025–26	League phase	(Denmark) Copenhagen	4–1 (H)	
2025–26	Round of 16	(England) Newcastle United	1–1 (A), 7–2 (H)	
2025–26	Quarter-final	(Spain) Atlético Madrid	0–2 (H), 2–1 (A)	
2026–27	League phase	(Netherlands) Feyenoord	5–1 (H)	
2026–27	League phase	(Turkey) Galatasaray	4–1 (A)	
2026–27	League phase	(France) Paris Saint-Germain	2–4 (A)	
2026–27	League phase	(England) Aston Villa	3–0 (H)	
2026–27	League phase	(Azerbaijan) Sabah		
2026–27	League phase	(England) Manchester City		
2026–27	League phase	(Portugal) Sporting CP		
2026–27	League phase	(Italy) Como		

== Cup Winners' Cup ==
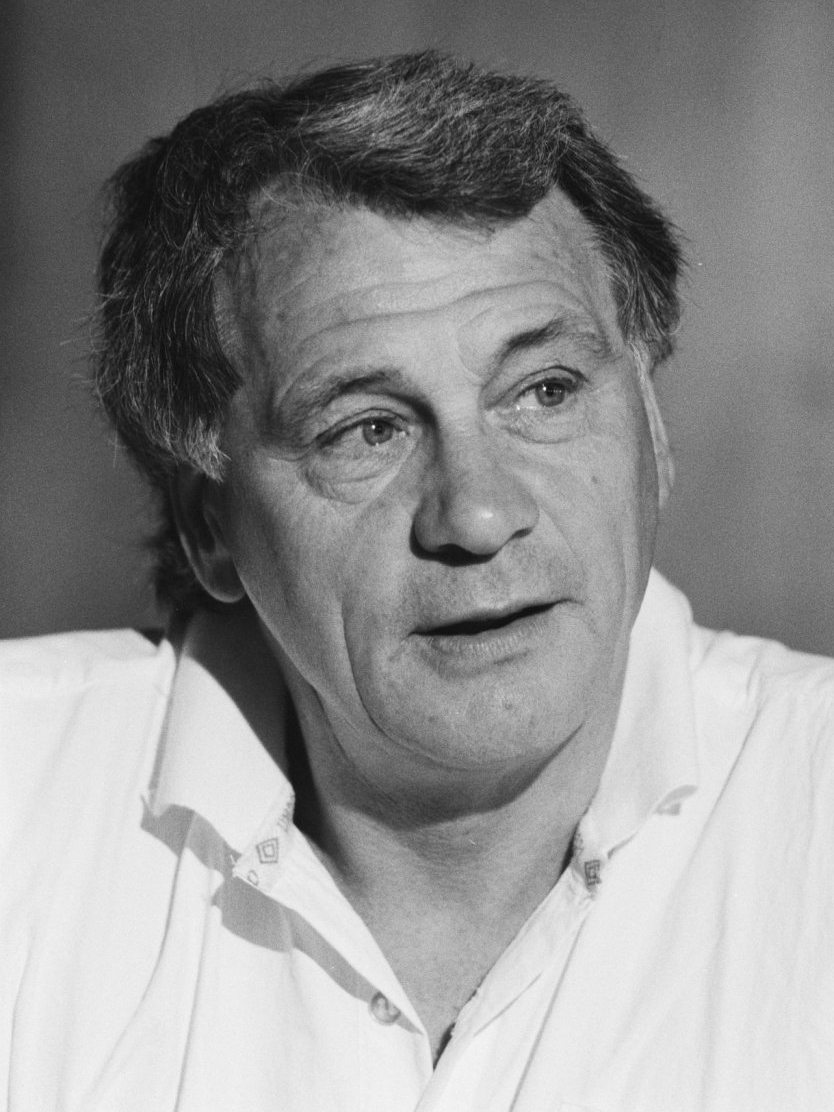
Bobby Robson (1988 image) led Barcelona to victory in the 1996–97 UEFA Cup Winners' Cup, which formed part of a cup treble.

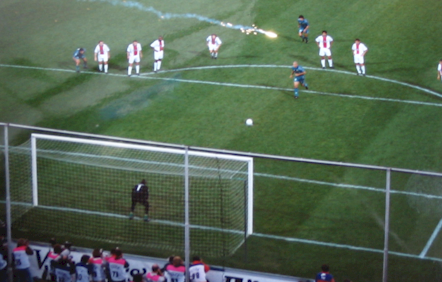
Ronaldo's converted penalty in the 1997 UEFA Cup Winners' Cup Final saw Barcelona beat PSG 1–0 and rack up a record fourth Cup Winners' Cup title.

The Cup Winners' Cup started in 1960, but it took three years until Barcelona participated for the first time. In their first edition, they were eliminated in the first round by Hamburg SV. In 1969, Barcelona's second participation, they advanced to the final, but were beaten by Czechoslovak side Slovan Bratislava. The first success came in 1979 when Barça defeated Fortuna Düsseldorf in the final 4–3 after extra time. This maiden success was emulated in 1982, 1989, and in their last participation in 1997, after another runner-up place in 1991, before the cup was merged into the UEFA Cup in 1999–2000. Barcelona's four victories are the competition's record.

Season	Round	Opposing team	Score	Notes
1963–64	First round	(Republic of Ireland) Shelbourne	2–0 (A), 3–1 (H)	
1963–64	Second round	(West Germany) Hamburger SV	4–4 (H), 0–0 (A), 2–3 (N)	^{[G]}
1968–69	First round	(Switzerland) Lugano	1–0 (A), 3–0 (H)	
1968–69	Second round	Bye		
1968–69	Quarter-final	(Norway) Lyn	3–2 (H), 2–2 (A)	
1968–69	Semi-final	(West Germany) 1. FC Köln	2–2 (A), 4–1 (H)	
1968–69	Final	(Czechoslovakia) Slovan Bratislava	2–3 (N)	
1971–72	First round	(Northern Ireland) Distillery	3–1 (A), 4–0 (H)	
1971–72	Second round	(Romania) Steaua București	0–1 (H), 1–2 (A)	
1978–79	First round	(Soviet Union) Shakhtar Donetsk	3–0 (H), 1–1 (A)	
1978–79	Second round	(Belgium) Anderlecht	0–3 (A), 3–0 (H)	^{[F]}
1978–79	Quarter-final	(England) Ipswich Town	1–2 (A), 1–0 (H)	^{[A]}
1978–79	Semi-final	(Belgium) Beveren	1–0 (H), 1–0 (A)	
1978–79	Final	(West Germany) Fortuna Düsseldorf	4–3 (N)	
1979–80	First round	(Iceland) ÍA	1–0 (A), 5–0 (H)	
1979–80	Second round	(Luxembourg) Aris Bonnevoie	4–1 (A), 7–1 (H)	
1979–80	Quarter-final	(Spain) Valencia	0–1 (H), 3–4 (A)	
1981–82	First round	(Bulgaria) Botev Plovdiv	4–1 (H), 0–1 (A)	
1981–82	Second round	(Czechoslovakia) Dukla Prague	0–1 (A), 4–0 (H)	
1981–82	Quarter-final	(East Germany) Lokomotive Leipzig	3–0 (A), 1–2 (H)	
1981–82	Semi-final	(England) Tottenham Hotspur	1–1 (A), 1–0 (H)	
1981–82	Final	(Belgium) Standard Liège	2–1 (H)	
1982–83	First round	(Cyprus) Apollon Limassol	8–0 (H), 1–1 (A)	
1982–83	Second round	(Socialist Federal Republic of Yugoslavia) Red Star Belgrade	4–2 (H), 2–1 (A)	
1982–83	Quarter-final	Austria Wien	0–0 (A), 1–1 (H)	^{[B]}
1983–84	First round	(East Germany) 1. FC Magdeburg	5–1 (A), 2–0 (H)	
1983–84	Second round	(Netherlands) NEC	3–2 (A), 2–0 (H)	
1983–84	Quarter-final	(England) Manchester United	2–0 (H), 0–3 (A)	
1984–85	First round	(France) Metz	4–2 (A), 1–4 (H)	
1988–89	First round	(Iceland) Fram	2–0 (A), 5–0 (H)	
1988–89	Second round	(Poland) Lech Poznań	1–1 (H), 1–1 (A)	^{[D]}
1988–89	Quarter-final	(Denmark) AGF	1–0 (A), 0–0 (H)	
1988–89	Semi-final	(Bulgaria) CSKA Sofia	4–2 (H), 2–1 (A)	
1988–89	Final	(Italy) Sampdoria	2–0 (N)	
1989–90	First round	(Poland) Legia Warsaw	1–1 (H), 1–0 (A)	
1989–90	Second round	(Belgium) Anderlecht	0–2 (A), 2–1 (H)	
1990–91	First round	(Turkey) Trabzonspor	0–1 (A), 7–2 (H)	
1990–91	Second round	(Iceland) Fram	2–1 (A), 3–0 (H)	
1990–91	Quarter-final	(Soviet Union) Dynamo Kyiv	3–2 (A), 1–1 (H)	
1990–91	Semi-final	(Italy) Juventus	3–1 (H), 0–1 (A)	
1990–91	Final	(England) Manchester United	1–2 (N)	
1996–97	First round	(Cyprus) AEK Larnaca	2–0 (H), 0–0 (A)	
1996–97	Second round	(Federal Republic of Yugoslavia) Red Star Belgrade	3–1 (H), 1–1 (A)	
1996–97	Quarter-final	(Sweden) AIK	3–1 (H), 1–1 (A)	
1996–97	Semi-final	(Italy) Fiorentina	1–1 (H), 2–0 (A)	
1996–97	Final	(France) Paris Saint-Germain	1–0 (N)	

== Inter-Cities Fairs Cup ==
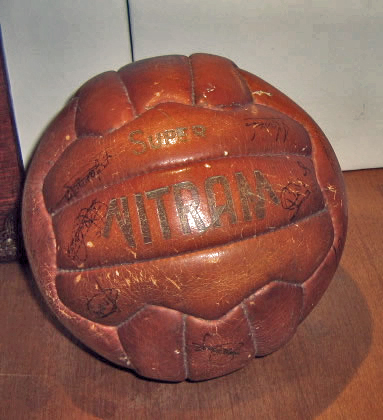
The ball used in the final of the 1958 edition of the Inter-Cities Fairs Cup, residing in the FC Barcelona Museum.

The Inter-Cities Fairs Cup was established on 18 April 1955, two weeks after the European Cup, to promote trade fairs by playing various cities against each other. However, the city of Barcelona participated with a squad composed entirely of Barcelona players. From 1958 onwards, the organisers reverted to club participation, but the teams still had to come from cities staging trade fairs. Barcelona would go on to win the Fairs Cup a record three times, with also a runner-up place, before the tournament was subsumed into the UEFA Cup in 1971.

The Inter-Cities Fairs Cup is considered to be the forerunner of the UEFA Cup / Europa League, but it is not recognized as a UEFA competition. Consequently, Fairs Cup wins do not count toward the tally of Europa League wins.

Season	Round	Opposing team	Score	Notes
1955–58	Group A	(Denmark) Copenhagen XI	6–2 (H), 1–1 (A)	
1955–58	Group A	(Austria) Vienna XI		^{[L]}
1955–58	Semi-final	(England) Birmingham City	3–4 (A), 1–0 (H), 2–1 (N)	^{[J]}
1955–58	Final	(England) London XI	2–2 (A), 6–0 (H)	
1958–60	First round	(Switzerland) Basel XI	2–1 (A), 5–2 (H)	
1958–60	Quarter-final	(Italy) Internazionale	4–0 (H), 4–2 (A)	
1958–60	Semi-final	(Socialist Federal Republic of Yugoslavia) Belgrade XI	1–1 (A), 3–1 (H)	
1958–60	Final	(England) Birmingham City	0–0 (A), 4–1 (H)	
1960–61	First round	(Socialist Federal Republic of Yugoslavia) Zagreb XI	1–1 (A), 4–3 (H)	
1960–61	Quarter-final	(Scotland) Hibernian	4–4 (H), 2–3 (A)	
1961–62	First round	(West Germany) West Berlin XI	0–1 (A), 3–0 (H)	
1961–62	Second round	(Socialist Federal Republic of Yugoslavia) Dinamo Zagreb	5–1 (H), 2–2 (A)	
1961–62	Quarter-final	(England) Sheffield Wednesday	2–3 (A), 2–0 (H)	
1961–62	Semi-final	(Socialist Federal Republic of Yugoslavia) Red Star Belgrade	2–0 (A), 4–1 (H)	
1961–62	Final	(Spain) Valencia	2–6 (A), 1–1 (H)	
1962–63	First round	(Portugal) Belenenses	1–1 (A), 1–1 (H), 3–2 (N)	^{[M]}
1962–63	Second round	(Socialist Federal Republic of Yugoslavia) Red Star Belgrade	2–3 (A), 1–0 (H), 0–1 (N)	^{[K]}
1964–65	First round	(Italy) Fiorentina	0–1 (H), 2–0 (A)	
1964–65	Second round	(Scotland) Celtic	3–1 (H), 0–0 (A)	
1964–65	Third round	(France) Strasbourg	0–0 (A), 2–2 (H), 0–0 (N)	^{[C]}
1965–66	First round	(Netherlands) Utrecht	0–0 (A), 7–1 (H)	
1965–66	Second round	(Belgium) Antwerp	1–2 (A), 2–0 (H)	
1965–66	Third round	(West Germany) Hannover 96	1–2 (A), 1–0 (H), 1–1 (N)	^{[I]}
1965–66	Quarter-final	(Spain) Espanyol	1–0 (H), 1–0 (A)	
1965–66	Semi-final	(England) Chelsea	2–0 (H), 0–2 (A), 5–0 (H)	^{[H]}
1965–66	Final	(Spain) Zaragoza	0–1 (H), 4–2 (A)	
1966–67	First round	Bye		
1966–67	Second round	(Scotland) Dundee United	1–2 (H), 0–2 (A)	
1967–68	First round	(Switzerland) Zürich	1–3 (A), 1–0 (H)	
1969–70	First round	(Denmark) B 1913	4–0 (H), 2–0 (A)	
1969–70	Second round	(Hungary) Győri ETO	3–2 (A), 2–0 (H)	
1969–70	Third round	(Italy) Internazionale	1–2 (H), 1–1 (A)	
1970–71	First round	(Poland) GKS Katowice	1–0 (A), 3–2 (H)	
1970–71	Second round	(Italy) Juventus	1–2 (H), 1–2 (A)	
1971	Play-off Match	(England) Leeds United	2–1 (H)	

== UEFA Cup / Europa League ==
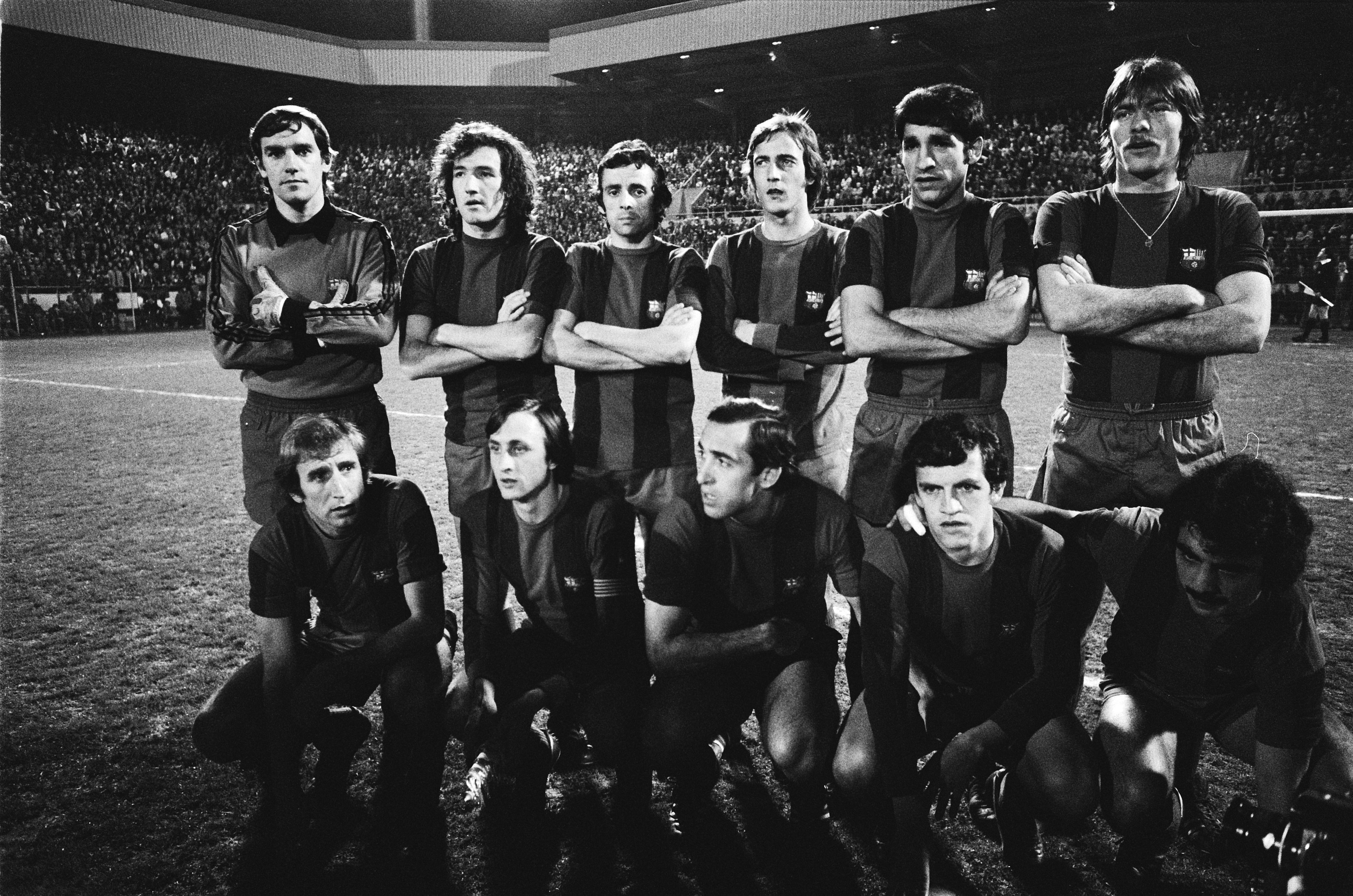
Barcelona face PSV Eindhoven in the 1977–78 UEFA Cup semi-finals. They also finished the season as Copa del Rey winners.

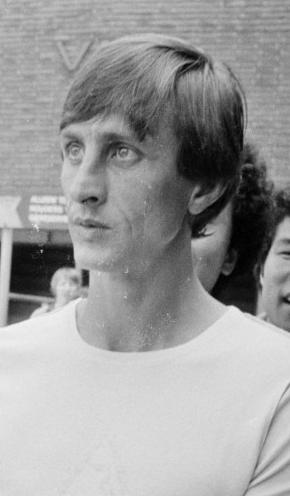
Johan Cruyff participated in several unsuccessful attempts to win the UEFA Cup in his time with Barcelona.

In the UEFA Cup, Barcelona has lost four semi-finals, in 1975–76, 1977–78, 1995–96 and 2000–01. They lost twice to Liverpool (in 1976 and 2001), once to PSV Eindhoven (in 1978) and once to Bayern Munich (in 1996). In all four cases, the team that had eliminated Barcelona ultimately won the competition. Barcelona participated in the re-branded Europa League for the first time in 2022, going out at the hands of eventual winners Eintracht Frankfurt in the quarter-finals.

Season	Round	Opposing team	Score	Notes
1972–73	First round	(Portugal) Porto	1–3 (A), 0–1 (H)	
1973–74	First round	(France) Nice	0–3 (A), 2–0 (H)	
1975–76	First round	(Greece) PAOK	0–1 (A), 6–1 (H)	
1975–76	Second round	(Italy) Lazio	3–0 (A), 4–0 (H)	
1975–76	Third round	(Hungary) Vasas	3–1 (H), 1–0 (A)	
1975–76	Quarter-final	(Bulgaria) Levski Sofia	4–0 (H), 4–5 (A)	
1975–76	Semi-final	(England) Liverpool	0–1 (H), 1–1 (A)	
1976–77	First round	(Portugal) Belenenses	2–2 (A), 3–2 (H)	
1976–77	Second round	(Belgium) Lokeren	2–0 (H), 1–2 (A)	
1976–77	Third round	(Sweden) Östers IF	3–0 (A), 5–1 (H)	
1976–77	Quarter-final	(Spain) Athletic Bilbao	1–2 (A), 2–2 (H)	
1977–78	First round	(Romania) Steaua București	5–1 (H), 3–1 (A)	
1977–78	Second round	(Netherlands) AZ	1–1 (A), 1–1 (H)	^{[D]}
1977–78	Third round	(England) Ipswich Town	0–3 (A), 3–0 (H)	^{[F]}
1977–78	Quarter-final	(England) Aston Villa	2–2 (A), 2–1 (H)	
1977–78	Semi-final	(Netherlands) PSV Eindhoven	0–3 (A), 3–1 (H)	
1980–81	First round	(Malta) Sliema Wanderers	2–0 (A), 1–0 (H)	
1980–81	Second round	(West Germany) 1. FC Köln	1–0 (A), 0–4 (H)	
1986–87	First round	(Albania) Flamurtari	1–1 (A), 0–0 (H)	^{[A]}
1986–87	Second round	(Portugal) Sporting CP	1–0 (H), 1–2 (A)	^{[A]}
1986–87	Third round	(West Germany) Uerdingen 05	2–0 (A), 2–0 (H)	
1986–87	Quarter-final	(Scotland) Dundee United	0–1 (A), 1–2 (H)	
1987–88	First round	(Portugal) Belenenses	2–0 (H), 0–1 (A)	
1987–88	Second round	(Soviet Union) Dynamo Moscow	2–0 (H), 0–0 (A)	
1987–88	Third round	(Albania) Flamurtari	4–1 (H), 0–1 (A)	
1987–88	Quarter-final	(West Germany) Bayer Leverkusen	0–0 (A), 0–1 (H)	
1995–96	First round	(Israel) Hapoel Be'er Sheva	7–0 (A), 5–0 (H)	
1995–96	Second round	(Portugal) Vitória de Guimarães	3–0 (H), 4–0 (A)	
1995–96	Third round	(Spain) Sevilla	1–1 (A), 3–1 (H)	
1995–96	Quarter-final	(Netherlands) PSV Eindhoven	2–2 (H), 3–2 (A)	
1995–96	Semi-final	(Germany) Bayern Munich	2–2 (A), 1–2 (H)	
2000–01	Third round	(Belgium) Club Brugge	2–0 (A), 1–1 (H)	
2000–01	Fourth round	(Greece) AEK Athens	1–0 (A), 5–0 (H)	
2000–01	Quarter-final	(Spain) Celta Vigo	2–1 (H), 2–3 (A)	^{[A]}
2000–01	Semi-final	(England) Liverpool	0–0 (H), 0–1 (A)	
2003–04	First round	(Slovakia) Matador Púchov	1–1 (A), 8–0 (H)	
2003–04	Second round	(Greece) Panionios	3–0 (A), 2–0 (H)	
2003–04	Third round	(Denmark) Brøndby	1–0 (A), 2–1 (H)	
2003–04	Fourth round	(Scotland) Celtic	0–1 (A), 0–0 (H)	
2021–22	Knockout round play-offs	(Italy) Napoli	1–1 (H), 4–2 (A)	
2021–22	Round of 16	(Turkey) Galatasaray	0–0 (H), 2–1 (A)	
2021–22	Quarter-final	(Germany) Eintracht Frankfurt	1–1 (A), 2–3 (H)	
2022–23	Knockout round play-offs	(England) Manchester United	2–2 (H), 1–2 (A)	

== Super Cup ==
The Super Cup was inaugurated in 1973, pitting the holders of the first-tier European Cup against the winners of the second-tier and now defunct Cup Winners' Cup. Following the abolition of the Cup Winners' Cup, the winners of the Europa League gain entry to the match. Barcelona first participated in the 1979 edition, after they won the 1978–79 Cup Winners' Cup. They lost 1–2 on aggregate to Nottingham Forest, having drawn 1–1 in Camp Nou after losing 0–1 at the City Ground in Nottingham. The first victory came in the 1992 edition, when Barça defeated Werder Bremen 3–2 on aggregate. Since then, Barcelona has won the competition four additional times (in 1997, 2009, 2011 and 2015), and now shares the record for second-most victories in the competition (five), tied with Milan and behind Real Madrid (six).

Year	Opposing team	Score	Venue
1979	(England) Nottingham Forest	0–1 (A), 1–1 (H)	Two-legged
1982	(England) Aston Villa	1–0 (H), 0–3 (a.e.t.) (A)	Two-legged
1989	(Italy) Milan	1–1 (H), 0–1 (A)	Two-legged
1992	(Germany) Werder Bremen	1–1 (A), 2–1 (H)	Two-legged
1997	(Germany) Borussia Dortmund	2–0 (H), 1–1 (A)	Two-legged
2006	(Spain) Sevilla	0–3 (N)	Stade Louis II, Monaco
2009	(Ukraine) Shakhtar Donetsk	1–0 (a.e.t.) (N)	Stade Louis II, Monaco
2011	(Portugal) Porto	2–0 (N)	Stade Louis II, Monaco
2015	(Spain) Sevilla	5–4 (a.e.t.) (N)	Boris Paichadze Dinamo Arena, Tbilisi

== Intercontinental Cup / Club World Cup ==
In 1960, UEFA and their South-American equivalent, the South American Football Confederation (CONMEBOL), created the Intercontinental Cup as a way of determining the best team in the world, by pitting the winners of the European Cup and the South American Copa Libertadores against each other. Barcelona have made only one appearance in the Intercontinental Cup, losing 2–1 against São Paulo in December 1992. In 2000, FIFA launched their international club competition called the FIFA Club World Cup, featuring teams from all of its member associations. In the second edition of the Club World Cup, in 2005, FIFA took over the Intercontinental Cup, subsuming it into its own competition. Barcelona has won the FIFA Club World Cup three times (in 2009, 2011 and 2015) and was runner-up once (in 2006).

Year	Competition	Round	Opposing team	Score
1992	Intercontinental Cup	Final	(Brazil) São Paulo	1–2 (N)
2006	FIFA Club World Cup	Semi-finals	(Mexico) América	4–0 (N)
2006	FIFA Club World Cup	Final	(Brazil) Internacional	0–1 (N)
2009	FIFA Club World Cup	Semi-finals	(Mexico) Atlante	3–1 (N)
2009	FIFA Club World Cup	Final	(Argentina) Estudiantes	2–1 (N)
2011	FIFA Club World Cup	Semi-finals	(Qatar) Al Sadd	4–0 (N)
2011	FIFA Club World Cup	Final	(Brazil) Santos	4–0 (N)
2015	FIFA Club World Cup	Semi-finals	(China) Guangzhou Evergrande	3–0 (N)
2015	FIFA Club World Cup	Final	(Argentina) River Plate	3–0 (N)

== Head-to-head record ==
More wins than losses
As many wins as losses
Fewer wins than losses

Matches ended in extra time are counted as a win/loss.

Matches ended on penalties are counted as whatever result preceded it.

Correct as of 20 October 2026, after the match against Paris Saint-Germain.

=== Against UEFA members ===
Country	Club	Pld	W	D	L	W %
(Italy)	Milan	19	8	6	5	42.11
(Italy)	Internazionale	18	8	6	4	44.44
(England)	Chelsea	18	6	6	6	33.33
(France)	Paris Saint-Germain	17	6	4	7	35.29
(Germany)	Bayern Munich	16	3	2	11	18.75
(England)	Manchester United	15	6	5	4	40.00
(Italy)	Juventus	15	5	4	6	33.33
(Ukraine)	Dynamo Kyiv	14	10	1	3	71.43
(Scotland)	Celtic	14	9	3	2	64.29
(Portugal)	Benfica	12	6	4	2	50.00
(Turkey)	Galatasaray	11	7	3	1	63.64
(Ukraine)	Shakhtar Donetsk	11	7	1	3	63.64
(Serbia)	Red Star Belgrade	10	7	1	2	70.00
(Portugal)	Porto	10	7	0	3	70.00
(Germany)	Bayer Leverkusen	10	6	2	2	60.00
(England)	Liverpool	10	3	3	4	30.00
(England)	Arsenal	9	6	2	1	66.67
(France)	Lyon	8	5	3	0	62.50
(Netherlands)	PSV Eindhoven	8	4	3	1	50.00
(Spain)	Real Madrid	8	2	3	3	25.00
(England)	Newcastle United	7	5	1	1	71.43
(Germany)	Borussia Dortmund	7	4	2	1	57.14
(Portugal)	Belenenses	7	3	3	1	42.86
(England)	Manchester City	6	5	0	1	83.33
(Portugal)	Sporting CP	6	5	0	1	83.33
(Germany)	Werder Bremen	6	4	2	0	66.67
(Greece)	Panathinaikos	6	4	1	1	66.67
(Czech Republic)	Sparta Prague	6	4	0	2	66.67
(Italy)	Napoli	6	3	3	0	50.00
(Italy)	Fiorentina	6	3	2	1	50.00
(Germany)	Hamburger SV	6	2	2	2	33.33
(Italy)	Roma	6	2	2	2	33.33
(Spain)	Atlético Madrid	6	2	1	3	33.33
(Spain)	Valencia	6	1	1	4	16.67
(Belgium)	Club Brugge	5	3	2	0	60.00
(England)	Birmingham City	5	3	1	1	60.00
(England)	Leeds United	5	2	2	1	40.00
(Romania)	Steaua București	5	2	1	2	40.00
(Germany)	1. FC Köln	4	2	1	1	50.00
(Austria)	Austria Wien	4	2	2	0	50.00
(Spain)	Sevilla	4	2	1	1	50.00
(Germany)	VfB Stuttgart	4	3	1	0	75.00
(England)	Tottenham Hotspur	4	2	2	0	50.00
(Bulgaria)	Levski Sofia	4	3	0	1	75.00
(Denmark)	Brøndby	4	4	0	0	100.00
(Bulgaria)	CSKA Sofia	4	3	1	0	75.00
(Russia)	Spartak Moscow	4	3	1	0	75.00
(Poland)	Legia Warsaw	4	3	1	0	75.00
(Sweden)	AIK	4	3	1	0	75.00
(England)	Aston Villa	4	2	1	1	50.00
(Poland)	Wisła Kraków	4	3	0	1	75.00
(Netherlands)	Ajax	4	3	0	1	75.00
(Belarus)	BATE Borisov	4	4	0	0	100.00
(Czech Republic)	Viktoria Plzeň	4	4	0	0	100.00
(Iceland)	Fram	4	4	0	0	100.00
(Belgium)	Anderlecht	4	2	0	2	50.00
(England)	Ipswich Town	4	2	0	2	50.00
(Belgium)	Antwerp	4	2	0	2	50.00
(Russia)	Rubin Kazan	4	1	2	1	25.00
(Albania)	Flamurtari	4	1	2	1	25.00
(Sweden)	IFK Göteborg	4	1	1	2	25.00
(Scotland)	Dundee United	4	0	0	4	0.00
(Denmark)	Copenhagen	3	2	1	0	66.67
(Netherlands)	Feyenoord	3	2	1	0	66.67
(Greece)	Olympiacos	3	2	1	0	66.67
(Czech Republic)	Slavia Prague	3	2	1	0	66.67
(Germany)	Eintracht Frankfurt	3	1	1	1	33.33
(Germany)	Hannover 96	3	1	1	1	33.33
(France)	Monaco	3	2	0	1	66.67
(France)	Strasbourg	3	0	3	0	0.00
(Germany)	Borussia Mönchengladbach	2	2	0	0	100.00
(Spain)	Espanyol	2	2	0	0	100.00
(Switzerland)	Basel	2	1	1	0	50.00
(Germany)	Schalke 04	2	2	0	0	100.00
(Turkey)	Fenerbahçe	2	2	0	0	100.00
(Germany)	Hertha BSC	2	1	1	0	50.00
(Germany)	Uerdingen 05	2	2	0	0	100.00
(Russia)	Dynamo Moscow	2	1	1	0	50.00
(Scotland)	Rangers	2	1	1	0	50.00
(Greece)	Panionios	2	2	0	0	100.00
(Norway)	Lyn	2	1	1	0	50.00
(Germany)	1. FC Magdeburg	2	2	0	0	100.00
(Belgium)	Lierse	2	2	0	0	100.00
(Norway)	Viking	2	1	1	0	50.00
(Hungary)	Ferencváros	2	2	0	0	100.00
(Malta)	Sliema Wanderers	2	2	0	0	100.00
(Austria)	Linz	2	1	1	0	50.00
(Italy)	Lazio	2	2	0	0	100.00
(Italy)	Udinese	2	2	0	0	100.00
(Croatia)	Dinamo Zagreb	2	1	1	0	50.00
(Cyprus)	Apollon Limassol	2	1	1	0	50.00
(Netherlands)	NEC	2	2	0	0	100.00
(England)	Wolverhampton Wanderers	2	2	0	0	100.00
(Denmark)	AGF	2	1	1	0	50.00
(Russia)	Lokomotiv Moscow	2	2	0	0	100.00
(Italy)	Sampdoria	2	2	0	0	100.00
(Latvia)	Skonto	2	2	0	0	100.00
(Belgium)	Beveren	2	2	0	0	100.00
(Iceland)	ÍA	2	2	0	0	100.00
(Sweden)	Östers IF	2	2	0	0	100.00
(Czech Republic)	Hradec Králové	2	1	1	0	50.00
(Cyprus)	AEK Larnaca	2	1	1	0	50.00
(Portugal)	Vitória de Guimarães	2	2	0	0	100.00
(Greece)	AEK Athens	2	2	0	0	100.00
(Slovakia)	Púchov	2	1	1	0	50.00
(Cyprus)	APOEL	2	2	0	0	100.00
(Switzerland)	Lugano	2	2	0	0	100.00
(Israel)	Hapoel Be'er Sheva	2	2	0	0	100.00
(Republic of Ireland)	Shelbourne	2	2	0	0	100.00
(Northern Ireland)	Distillery	2	2	0	0	100.00
(Hungary)	Vasas	2	2	0	0	100.00
(Denmark)	B 1913	2	2	0	0	100.00
(Hungary)	Győri ETO	2	2	0	0	100.00
(Sweden)	Åtvidabergs FF	2	2	0	0	100.00
(Poland)	GKS Katowice	2	2	0	0	100.00
(Luxembourg)	Aris Bonnevoie	2	2	0	0	100.00
(England)	London XI	2	1	1	0	50.00
(Switzerland)	Basel XI	2	2	0	0	100.00
(Socialist Federal Republic of Yugoslavia)	Belgrade XI	2	1	1	0	50.00
(Croatia)	Zagreb XI	2	1	1	0	50.00
(Denmark)	Copenhagen XI	2	1	1	0	50.00
(Netherlands)	Utrecht	2	1	1	0	50.00
(France)	Metz	2	1	0	1	50.00
(France)	Nice	2	1	0	1	50.00
(Turkey)	Trabzonspor	2	1	0	1	50.00
(Czech Republic)	Dukla Prague	2	1	0	1	50.00
(Germany)	Lokomotive Leipzig	2	1	0	1	50.00
(Belgium)	Lokeren	2	1	0	1	50.00
(England)	Sheffield Wednesday	2	1	0	1	50.00
(Netherlands)	AZ	2	0	2	0	0.00
(Greece)	PAOK	2	1	0	1	50.00
(Bulgaria)	Botev Plovdiv	2	1	0	1	50.00
(Germany)	Hansa Rostock	2	1	0	1	50.00
(Spain)	Celta Vigo	2	1	0	1	50.00
(Spain)	Zaragoza	2	1	0	1	50.00
(Germany)	1. FC Kaiserslautern	2	1	0	1	50.00
(Turkey)	Beşiktaş	2	1	0	1	50.00
(Poland)	Lech Poznań	2	0	2	0	0.00
(Switzerland)	Zürich	2	1	0	1	50.00
(Germany)	West Berlin XI	2	1	0	1	50.00
(England)	Nottingham Forest	2	0	1	1	0.00
(Scotland)	Hibernian	2	0	1	1	0.00
(Russia)	CSKA Moscow	2	0	1	1	0.00
(Spain)	Athletic Bilbao	2	0	1	1	0.00
(Italy)	Atalanta	1	0	1	0	0.00
(France)	Brest	1	1	0	0	100.00
(Germany)	Fortuna Düsseldorf	1	1	0	0	100.00
(Belgium)	Standard Liège	1	1	0	0	100.00
(Slovakia)	Slovan Bratislava	1	0	0	1	0.00
(Switzerland)	Young Boys	1	1	0	0	100.00
Total: 150 clubs played		634	355	141	138	55.99

=== against other members associations ===
Confederation	Country	Club	Pld	W	D	L	W %
CONCACAF	(Mexico)	América	1	1	0	0	100.00
CONCACAF	(Mexico)	Atlante	1	1	0	0	100.00
AFC	(Qatar)	Al Sadd	1	1	0	0	100.00
AFC	(China)	Guangzhou Evergrande	1	1	0	0	100.00
CONMEBOL	(Argentina)	Estudiantes	1	1	0	0	100.00
CONMEBOL	(Argentina)	River Plate	1	1	0	0	100.00
CONMEBOL	(Brazil)	Santos	1	1	0	0	100.00
CONMEBOL	(Brazil)	Internacional	1	0	0	1	0.00
CONMEBOL	(Brazil)	São Paulo	1	0	0	1	0.00
Total: 9 clubs played			9	7	0	2	77.78

== Notes ==
- A. ^{a} ^{b} ^{c} ^{d} ^{e} ^{f} ^{g} ^{h} Won on the away goals rule.
- B. ^{a} ^{b} ^{c} Lost on the away goals rule.
- C. ^{a} Lost on coin toss after play-off.
- D. ^{a} ^{b} ^{c} Won 5–4 on penalties.
- E. ^{a} Lost 0–2 on penalties.
- F. ^{a} Won 4–1 on penalties.
- G. ^{a} Lost play-off 2–3 in Lausanne.
- H. ^{a} Won play-off 5–0 in Barcelona.
- I. ^{a} Won on coin toss after play-off.
- J. ^{a} Won play-off 2–1 in Basel.
- K. ^{a} Lost play-off 0–1 in Nice.
- L. ^{a} Vienna XI withdrew from the competition.
- M. ^{a} Won play-off 3–2.
- N. ^{a} After the 1970–71 season, the Inter-Cities Fairs Cup was taken over by UEFA. A match was played between Barcelona, the first and record Fairs Cup winners, and Leeds United, the last winners, to decide who should keep the old Fairs Cup trophy permanently.
- O. ^{[]} Won play-off 1–0 in Brussels.
