= UC Sampdoria in European football =

Italian club in European football

U.C. Sampdoria in European football
- Club: Sampdoria
- Seasons played: 12
- First entry: 1962–63 Inter-Cities Fairs Cup
- Latest entry: 2015–16 UEFA Europa League

Titles
- Cup Winners' Cup: 1: 1990

These are the matches that Italian football club Sampdoria have played in European football competitions.

== Summary ==
The Genoese club have won one continental title: the Cup Winners' Cup in 1990, overcoming Anderlecht in Gothenburg.

This victory came during the greatest period of success in the history of the club, largely under coach Vujadin Boškov and featuring players such as Pagliuca, Mancini, Vialli, Vierchowod and Lombardo. In the 1988–89 Cup Winners' Cup they had finished runners-up to FC Barcelona in the Bern final, but in the same season won the Coppa Italia (one of four domestic cup wins from six finals in nine years), allowing another opportunity to compete for the European prize, which they duly achieved the following year. In the 1994–95 edition of the same tournament, Samp reached the semi-final before being eliminated on penalties by Arsenal.

In addition, Sampdoria won their only Serie A national title in 1991, and in the subsequent European Cup campaign they went all the way to the final in London, again facing Barcelona and losing by a single goal late in extra time. It was the last year before that competition became known as the Champions League, although its format did involve a group stage.

Since the mid-1990s, the club's European involvement has been less frequent and less prominent, although they have participated in the group stages of the UEFA Cup / Europa League on three occasions in the early 21st century (failing to progress each time).

== UEFA-organised seasonal competitions ==
Sampdoria's score listed first.

=== European Cup/Champions League ===
Season	Round	Club	Home	Away	Aggregate	Reference
1991–92	First round	(Norway) Rosenborg	5–0	2–1	7–1	
1991–92	Second round	(Hungary) Budapest Honvéd	3–1	1–2	4–3	
1991–92	Group A	(Socialist Federal Republic of Yugoslavia) Red Star Belgrade	2–0	3–1	1st	
1991–92	Group A	(Greece) Panathinaikos	1–1	0–0	1st	
1991–92	Group A	(Belgium) Anderlecht	2–0	2–3	1st	
1991–92	Final	(Spain) Barcelona	0–1 (a.e.t.) (N)			
2010–11	Play-off round	(Germany) Werder Bremen	3–2 (a.e.t.)	1–3	4–5	

=== European Cup Winners' Cup/UEFA Cup Winners' Cup ===
Season	Round	Club	Home	Away	Aggregate	Reference
1985–86	First round	(Greece) AEL	1–0	1–1	2–1	
1985–86	Second round	(Portugal) Benfica	1–0	0–2	1–2	
1988–89	First round	(Sweden) Norrköping	2–0	1–2	3–2	
1988–89	Second round	(Germany) Carl Zeiss Jena	3–1	1–1	4–2	
1988–89	Quarter-finals	(Romania) Dinamo București	0–0	1–1	1–1 (a)	
1988–89	Semi-finals	(Belgium) Mechelen	3–0	1–2	4–2	
1988–89	Final	(Spain) Barcelona	0–2 (N)			
1989–90	First round	(Norway) Brann	1–0	2–0	3–0	
1989–90	Second round	(Germany) Borussia Dortmund	2–0	1–1	3–1	
1989–90	Quarter-finals	(Switzerland) Grasshopper	2–0	2–1	4–1	
1989–90	Semi-finals	(France) Monaco	2–0	2–2	4–2	
1989–90	Final	(Belgium) Anderlecht	2–0 (a.e.t.) (N)			
1990–91	First round	(Germany) Kaiserslautern	2–0	0–1	2–1	
1990–91	Second round	(Greece) Olympiacos	3–1	1–0	4–1	
1990–91	Quarter-finals	(Poland) Legia Warsaw	2–2	0–1	2–3	
1994–95	First round	(Norway) Bodø/Glimt	2–0	2–3	4–3	
1994–95	Second round	(Switzerland) Grasshopper	3–0	2–3	5–3	
1994–95	Quarter-finals	(Portugal) Porto	0–1	1–0	1–1, 5–3 (p)	
1994–95	Semi-finals	(England) Arsenal	3–2	2–3	5–5, 2–3 (p)	

=== UEFA Cup/Europa League ===
Season	Round	Club	Home	Away	Aggregate	Reference
1997–98	First round	(Spain) Athletic Bilbao	1–2	0–2	1–4	
2005–06	First round	(Portugal) Vitória de Setúbal	1–0	1–1	2–1	
2005–06	Group C	(Romania) Steaua București	0–0	—N/a	4th	
2005–06	Group C	(Sweden) Halmstad	—N/a	3–1	4th	
2005–06	Group C	(Germany) Hertha BSC	0–0	—N/a	4th	
2005–06	Group C	(France) Lens	—N/a	1–2	4th	
2007–08	Second qualifying round	(Croatia) Hajduk Split	1–1	1–0	2–1	
2007–08	First round	(Denmark) AaB	2–2	0–0	2–2 (a)	
2008–09	First round	(Lithuania) Kaunas	5–0	2–1	7–1	
2008–09	Group C	(Serbia) Partizan	—N/a	2–1	3rd	
2008–09	Group C	(Germany) Stuttgart	1–1	—N/a	3rd	
2008–09	Group C	(Belgium) Standard Liège	—N/a	0–3	3rd	
2008–09	Group C	(Spain) Sevilla	1–0	—N/a	3rd	
2008–09	Round of 32	(Ukraine) Metalist Kharkiv	0–1	0–2	0–3	
2010–11	Group I	(Netherlands) PSV Eindhoven	1–2	1–1	3rd	
2010–11	Group I	(Hungary) Debrecen	1–0	0–2	3rd	
2010–11	Group I	(Ukraine) Metalist Kharkiv	0–0	1–2	3rd	
2015–16	Third qualifying round	(Serbia) Vojvodina	0–4	2–0	2–4	

=== UEFA Intertoto Cup ===
Season	Round	Club	Home	Away	Aggregate	Reference
1998	Second round	(Slovakia) Rimavská Sobota	2–0	0–1	2–1	
1998	Third round	(Belgium) Harelbeke	3–0	1–0	4–0	
1998	Semi-finals	(Italy) Bologna	1–0	1–3	2–3	
2007	Third round	(Bulgaria) Cherno More Varna	1–0	1–0	2–0	

=== European Super Cup ===
Season	Club	Home	Away	Aggregate	Reference
1990	(Italy) Milan	1–1	0–2	1–3	

== FIFA-only recognized seasonal competitions ==
=== Inter-Cities Fairs Cup ===
Season	Round	Opposition	Home	Away	Aggregate
1962–63	First Round	(Luxembourg) Aris	1–0	2–0	3–0
1962–63	Second Round	(Hungary) Ferencváros	1–0	0–6	1–6

== Overall record ==
=== UEFA Competitions record ===
Accurate as of 27 August 2017

Competition	Played	Won	Drew	Lost	GF	GA	GD	Win%
European Cup / Champions League	13	7	2	4	25	14	+11	53.85
Cup Winners' Cup	36	19	7	10	54	33	+21	52.78
UEFA Cup / UEFA Europa League	28	9	9	10	29	30	−1	32.14
UEFA Super Cup	2	0	1	1	1	3	−2	0.00
UEFA Intertoto Cup	8	6	0	2	10	4	+6	75.00
Total	87	41	19	27	119	84	+35	47.13

Source: UEFA.com
Pld = Matches played; W = Matches won; D = Matches drawn; L = Matches lost; GF = Goals for; GA = Goals against; GD = Goal Difference.
