= George Courtney =

English football referee

George Courtney MBE
- Full name: George Courtney
- Born: 4 June 1941 (age 85); Spennymoor, County Durham, England
- Other occupation: Headteacher

Domestic
Years	League	Role
?–1973	Northern League	Referee
1971–1974	Football League	Assistant referee
1973–1974	(Supplementary List)	Referee
1974–1992	Football League	Referee

International
Years	League	Role
1977–1991	FIFA–listed	Referee

George Courtney MBE (born 4 June 1941) is an English former football referee based in Spennymoor, County Durham.

He is said to be a freemason. His vocational career was spent as a primary school headteacher.

== Ascent through English refereeing ==
Courtney started refereeing school games in and around his area of Spennymoor, in 1961. He later carried out both linesman and refereeing duties for the Northern League before becoming a Football League linesman in 1971. Just two years later he was appointed to the supplementary panel of referees and one year after that was included in the full list of referees at the age of only thirty three. In 1976, despite only being in his second year as a Football League referee, he was appointed to the decisive match for the League title in which Liverpool staged a dramatic recovery to beat Wolves and overtake QPR.

In 1977, he made the FIFA panel of referees. He had achieved this feat in only three seasons which was, until the case of Martin Atkinson in 2006, the quickest in modern times. In 1979, he took charge of the Charity Shield and was back at Wembley the following May for the ultimate honour of the FA Cup Final between West Ham and Arsenal.

== Personal life ==
Courtney is married with one child. He was a head teacher before his referee career took off.

On 9 February 2007, Courtney's son, Matthew, died after falling from the top floor of the gallery at the Tate Modern in London. An inquest in May 2007 heard that Matthew Courtney had undergone several years of treatment for bipolar disorder – which "may have been triggered by cannabis use". The Southwark coroner said that Matthew Courtney had been suicidal. However, he recorded a verdict of accidental death.

== Years at the top ==
Pat Partridge's retirement in 1981 followed by the unexpected early departure of another World Cup referee, Clive White, the following year, led to George Courtney becoming the dominant refereeing figure of the 1980s. He took charge of the 1983 League Cup Final, thus completing the hat trick of major Wembley matches. He went on to referee numerous FA Cup semi-finals as well as many top division games. He was due to retire in 1989 but in common with a number of other senior and respected officials at that time was granted an extension. He went on to serve three extra years on the list. This allowed him to officiate the second leg of the first division play off semi final between Newcastle United and Sunderland at St James's Park on 16 May 1990, which was won 2–0 by Sunderland after a 0–0 draw in the first leg. Courtney was forced to take the players off the field for 20 minutes late in the second half after Marco Gabbiadini's goal defeated Newcastle, leading to hundreds of Newcastle United supporters running onto the pitch.

== International experience ==
Courtney was a frequent figure in UEFA competitions and handled finals such as the 1989 Cup Winners Cup Final. He was England's representative at the 1984 European Championships he refereed the Semi Final between Denmark and Spain, followed by the FIFA World Cups of 1986 and 1990. His appointment for the match for third place in 1986 was the furthest any English referee had reached at the World Cup since Jack Taylor controlled the Final in 1974, until Howard Webb officiated the 2010 World Cup Final. The only competition he missed was the 1988 European Championships when Keith Hackett was selected.

== Retirement ==
Courtney retired from the FIFA list at the end of 1991 at the age of fifty. He was one of the last referees to have that privilege, as they reduced the maximum age for their officials to forty five at that point. He served out the rest of that season in England. He took charge of an unprecedented second League Cup Final in 1992. The final match of his eventful career was the play-off game between Blackburn and Leicester for a place in the new Premier League. Although extensions were still possible for over-age referees he had decided to retire from League refereeing, a few weeks short of his fifty-first birthday.

Courtney is a past student of Chester University College. He subsequently became Director of Community Projects at Middlesbrough F.C. He later worked as a UEFA delegate, charged with reporting on stadium and crowd control issues at UEFA matches, such as during the 1–0 UEFA Champions League win by F.C. Shakhtar Donetsk at S.L. Benfica on 3 October 2007.

Courtney was appointed a Member of the Order of the British Empire (MBE) in the 1991 New Year Honours for services to association football.

Preceded by UEFA Cup Winners' Cup Final 1988 (West Germany) Dieter Pauly	UEFA Cup Winners' Cup Final Referees; Final 1989 (England) George Courtney	Succeeded by UEFA Cup Winners' Cup Final 1990 (Switzerland) Bruno Galler
Preceded by Ron Challis	FA Cup Final Referee; 1980	Succeeded by Keith Hackett
