= Guy Marchoul =

Belgian footballer

Personal information
- Full name: Guy Marchoul
- Date of birth: 4 November 1965 (age 60)
- Place of birth: Anderlecht, Belgium
- Height: 1.74 m (5 ft 9 in)
- Position: Right wing back

Senior career*
Years	Team	Apps	(Gls)
1985-1995	R.S.C. Anderlecht	48	(0)
1991-1992	→ Lierse (loan)	19	(0)
1994-1995	Eendracht Aalst	3	(0)
Total		70	(0)
- * Club domestic league appearances and goals

Guy Marchoul (born 4 November 1965 in Anderlecht) is a former Belgian footballer who played as right back or central defender.

== Honours ==
=== Player ===
==== Anderlecht ====
- Belgian First Division: 1985–86, 1986–87, 1990–91, 1992–93, 1993–94
- Belgian Cup: 1987–88, 1988–89, 1993–94
- Belgian Super Cup: 1985, 1987, 1993
- European Cup Winners' Cup: 1989-90 (runners-up)
