= 1989 European Cup Winners' Cup final =

- Match programme cover
- Event: 1988–89 European Cup Winners' Cup
Barcelona	Sampdoria
(Spain)	(Italy)
2	0
- Date: 10 May 1989
- Venue: Wankdorf Stadium, Bern
- Referee: George Courtney (England)
- Attendance: 45,000

The 1989 European Cup Winners' Cup Final was a football match contested between Barcelona of Spain and Sampdoria of Italy. It was the final match of the 1988–89 European Cup Winners' Cup and the 29th European Cup Winners' Cup final. The final was held at Wankdorf Stadium in Bern, Switzerland, on 10 May 1989. Barcelona won the match 2–0 thanks to goals by Julio Salinas and Luis López Rekarte.

== Route to the final ==
(Spain) Barcelona				Round	(Italy) Sampdoria			
Opponent	Agg.	1st leg	2nd leg	Stages	Opponent	Agg.	1st leg	2nd leg
(Iceland) Fram	7–0	2–0 (A)	5–0 (H)	First round	(Sweden) IFK Norrköping	3–2	1–2 (A)	2–0 (H)
(Poland) Lech Poznań	2–2 (5–4 p)	1–1 (H)	1–1 (aet) (A)	Second round	(East Germany) Carl Zeiss Jena	4–2	1–1 (A)	3–1 (H)
(Denmark) AGF Aarhus	1–0	1–0 (A)	0–0 (H)	Quarter-finals	(Romania) Dinamo București	1–1 (a)	1–1 (A)	0–0 (H)
(Bulgaria) CFKA Sredets Sofia	6–3	4–2 (H)	2–1 (A)	Semi-finals	(Belgium) Mechelen	4–2	1–2 (A)	3–0 (H)

== Match ==
=== Details ===
10 May 1989
20:15 CEST

Barcelona (Spain)	2–0	(Italy) Sampdoria
Salinas 4'; López Rekarte 79'	Report

Wankdorf Stadium, Bern
Attendance: 45,000
Referee: George Courtney (England)

Barcelona	Sampdoria

GK	1	(Spain) Andoni Zubizarreta
CB	2	(Spain) Urbano	(yellow card) 28'
SW	3	(Spain) José Ramón Alexanko (c)
CB	4	(Brazil) Aloísio	(yellow card) 2'
DM	7	(Spain) Luis Milla		(substituted off) 60'
RCM	5	(Spain) Guillermo Amor
CM	8	(Spain) Roberto
LCM	6	(Spain) Eusebio
RW	10	(England) Gary Lineker
CF	9	(Spain) Julio Salinas
LW	11	(Spain) Txiki Begiristain		(substituted off) 74'
Substitutes:
GK	12	(Spain) Juan Carlos Unzué
MF	13	(Spain) Miquel Soler		(substituted on) 60'
DF	14	(Spain) Luis López Rekarte		(substituted on) 74'
DF	15	(Spain) Sergi
FW	16	(Spain) Lobo Carrasco
Manager:
(Netherlands) Johan Cruyff

GK	1	(Italy) Gianluca Pagliuca
RB	2	(Italy) Moreno Mannini	(substituted off) 27'
SW	6	(Italy) Luca Pellegrini (c)	(substituted off) 50'
CB	3	(Italy) Marco Lanna
LB	4	(Italy) Fausto Pari
DM	8	(Brazil) Toninho Cerezo
RCM	11	(Italy) Giuseppe Dossena
CM	7	(Italy) Fausto Salsano
LCM	5	(Spain) Víctor Muñoz
CF	9	(Italy) Gianluca Vialli
SS	10	(Italy) Roberto Mancini
Substitutes:
GK	12	(Italy) Sergio Marcon
RB	13	(Italy) Stefano Pellegrini	(substituted on) 27'
CM	14	(Italy) Fulvio Bonomi	(substituted on) 50'
FW	15	(Italy) Loris Pradella
Manager:
(Socialist Federal Republic of Yugoslavia) Vujadin Boškov

Assistant referees:
Joe Worrall (England)
Tony Ward (England)
Fourth official:
Georges Sandoz (Switzerland)

Match rules

- 90 minutes.
- 30 minutes of extra time if necessary.
- Penalty shoot-out if scores still level.
- Five named substitutes.
- Maximum of two substitutions.

== See also ==
- 1988–89 European Cup Winners' Cup
- 1989 European Cup Final
- 1989 UEFA Cup Final
- 1992 European Cup Final – contested by the same teams
- FC Barcelona in international football competitions
- U.C. Sampdoria in European football
