= Donald Van Durme =

Belgian footballer

Personal information
- Date of birth: 23 August 1967 (age 59)
- Position: Defender

Senior career*
Years	Team	Apps	(Gls)
1987–1990	RSC Anderlecht		
1990–1995	K.V. Kortrijk		
1995–2000	R.E. Mouscron		
- * Club domestic league appearances and goals

Donald Van Durme (born 23 August 1967) is a retired Belgian football defender.

== Honours ==
=== Club ===
Anderlecht

- Belgian Cup: 1987–88, 1988–89
- European Cup Winners' Cup: 1989-90 (runners-up)
- Bruges Matins: 1988
