= FC Barcelona Museum =

- Museu FC Barcelona President Núñez
- Established: 24 September 1984
- Location: Camp Nou, Barcelona
- Coordinates: 41.380°N 2.121°E
- Type: Sports Museum
- Visitors: 1,506,022 (2013)
- Director: Jordi Penas
- Public transit access: Collblanc; Palau Reial; Palau Reial
- Website: Official website

The FC Barcelona museum (Catalan: FC Barcelona Museu) was inaugurated on 24 September 1984 under the presidency of Josep Lluís Nuñez. In 2000, the museum was renamed President Nuñez museum under the presidency of his successor, Joan Gaspart. On 15 June 2010, the museum was reopened after a long restructuring.

The restructuring saw the museum split into three separate sections with a 3D cinema, audiovisual touch-screen, and information on the history of FC Barcelona. Since then the museum can only be visited by booking the package Camp Nou Experience, which includes the entrance to the museum and a tour of the stadium. The first section includes a collection of photos, documents and trophies detailing the club's history on an interactive glass wall, allowing visitors to touch the screens and see information wall. The glass wall, equipped with laser technology, allows the exhibition of video, images and music through user-feedback. The second section is a private art collection on permanent display at the museum which exhibits works by local artists such as Dalí, Miró and Tàpies. In the third section, the Futbolart Collection displays football memorabilia from the club including a trophy-room with every trophy, or a replica thereof, that the club has won.

One of the items at display in the Futbolart Collection is the boots with which Ronald Koeman scored the winning goal in the 1992 European Cup Final, which he did in the 111th minute against Sampdoria, 21 minutes into extra time, securing Barcelona's first European trophy.

The museum occupies 3,500 square meters and attracts 1.2 million visitors a year, ranking it second to the Museu Picasso, which attracts 1.3 million visitors, as the most visited museum in the city of Barcelona.

== Gallery ==
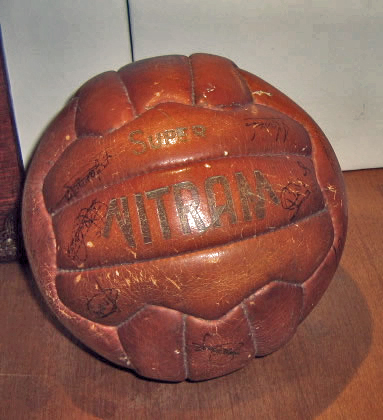
The leather ball used for the 1958 edition of the Inter-Cities Fairs cup.

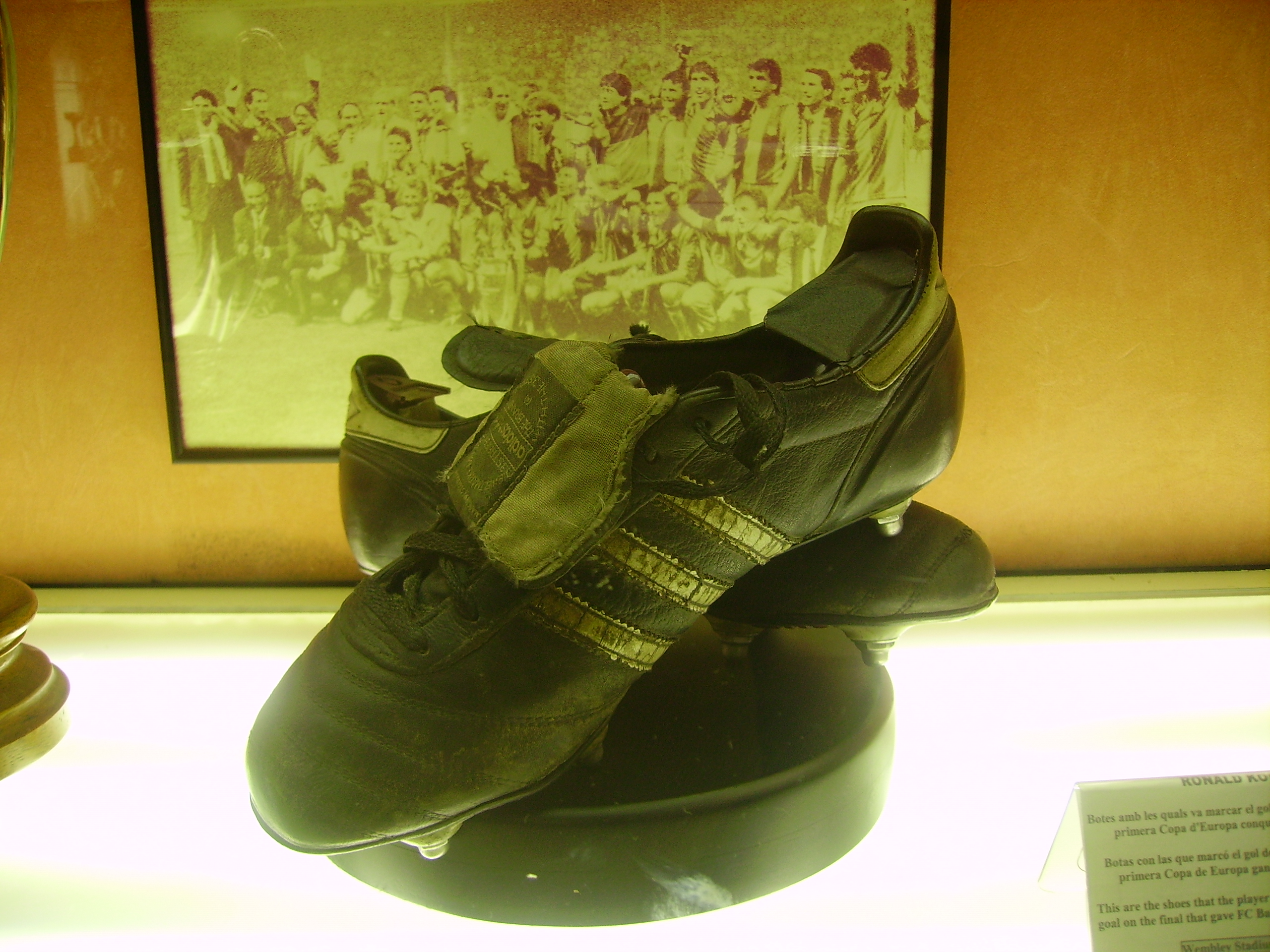
Ronald Koeman's Adidas boots used for the 1992 European Cup Final.

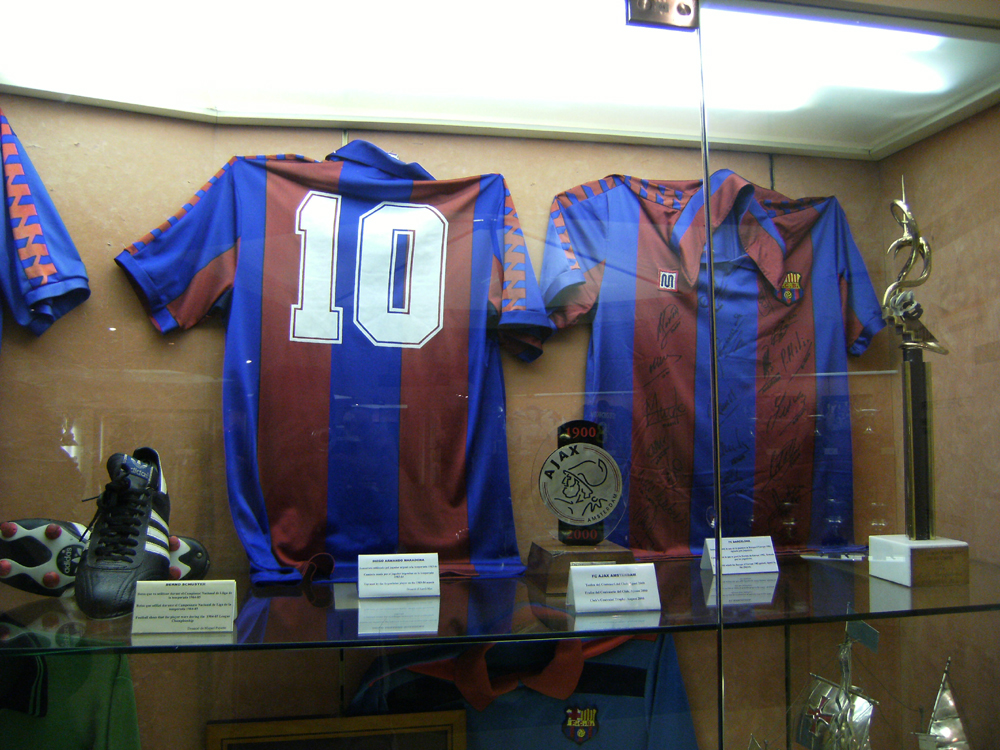
Diego Maradona's historical #10 Barcelona shirt.
