= 1992 European Cup final =

Association football match

- Match programme cover
- Event: 1991–92 European Cup
| Barcelona | Sampdoria |
| (Spain) | (Italy) |
| 1 | 0 |
- After extra time
- Date: 20 May 1992
- Venue: Wembley Stadium, London
- Referee: Aron Schmidhuber (Germany)
- Attendance: 70,827

The 1992 European Cup final was a football match held on 20 May 1992 at Wembley Stadium, London, between Barcelona of Spain and Sampdoria of Italy. Barcelona won the game 1–0 after extra time, thanks to a Ronald Koeman free kick, to record their first triumph in the competition. In 1992, Barcelona hosted the Summer Olympic Games, with its club winning the European Champion Clubs' Cup final.

While the Olympics were a national event for Spain, the European Cup was won by FC Barcelona, who claimed their first title in the competition. Prior to Johan Cruyff's appointment as Barcelona manager in 1988, the club had won 10 league titles and had not won a European Cup in its 89-year history. In the 38 years that followed, Barcelona won 19 league titles and five European Cups. It was the first to have a group stage involving the eight second-round winners split into two groups, and the winner of each one met in the final. In doing so, they became the second Spanish club to win the tournament and the 19th overall. This was the last final before the competition was re-branded as the Champions League. The final is, as of 2026, the most recent in which both of the finalists entered a European Cup/UEFA Champions League final having not won any of the previous finals.

The victory in London helped ease the disappointment of Barcelona's previous European Cup final defeats to Benfica in 1961 and Steaua Bucharest in 1986. But the defeat was difficult for the Italian side, who had also previously lost to Barcelona in the 1989 European Cup Winners' Cup final.

== Teams ==
| Team | Previous final appearances (bold indicates winners) |
|---|---|
| (Spain) Barcelona | 2 (1961, 1986) |
| (Italy) Sampdoria | None |

== Route to the final ==
=== Barcelona ===
Barcelona reached the final after several rounds. They first defeated Hansa Rostock over two legs, then advanced past Kaiserslautern on away goals after a 3–3 aggregate draw, secured by a late goal from José Mari Bakero. In the group stage, Barcelona finished ahead of Sparta Prague, Benfica, and Dynamo Kyiv to reach the final in London against Serie A champions Sampdoria.

=== Sampdoria ===
The Luigi Ferraris Stadium, shared by Genoese clubs and built in 1911, is located in the Marassi district. It hosted its first European Cup match in September 1991, when Sampdoria faced Norwegian champions Rosenborg in the first round. Sampdoria won the first leg 5–0, with Attilio Lombardo scoring the opening goal after 11 minutes, and secured progression with a 2–1 victory in Trondheim.In the second round, Sampdoria faced Budapest Honved. After losing the first leg 2–1, they won the return leg in Genoa, where Lombardo equalised the tie before Gianluca Vialli scored twice to secure a 4–3 aggregate victory and qualification for the group stage.In the group stage, Sampdoria were drawn with Panathinaikos, Red Star Belgrade, and Anderlecht, whom they had defeated in the previous season's Cup Winners' Cup final. Sampdoria finished top of the group, with Vialli and Roberto Mancini scoring three goals each. A 3–1 victory over Red Star proved decisive. Due to the Yugoslav Wars, Red Star played their home matches in Sofia and Budapest rather than in Belgrade. Sampdoria later drew with Panathinaikos in their final group match to secure first place and reach the European Cup final in their first appearance in the competition, 46 years after the club's formation.

| (Spain) Barcelona | | | | Round | (Italy) Sampdoria | | | |
|---|---|---|---|---|---|---|---|---|
| Opponent | Agg. | 1st leg | 2nd leg | | Opponent | Agg. | 1st leg | 2nd leg |
| (Germany) Hansa Rostock | 3–1 | 3–0 (H) | 0–1 (A) | First round | (Norway) Rosenborg | 7–1 | 5–0 (H) | 2–1 (A) |
| (Germany) 1. FC Kaiserslautern | 3–3 (a) | 2–0 (H) | 1–3 (A) | Second round | (Hungary) Kispest Honvéd | 4–3 | 1–2 (A) | 3–1 (H) |
| Opponent | Result | | | Group stage | Opponent | Result | | |
| (Czechoslovakia) Sparta Prague | 3–2 (H) | | | Matchday 1 | (Socialist Federal Republic of Yugoslavia) Red Star Belgrade | 2–0 (H) | | |
| (Portugal) Benfica | 0–0 (A) | | | Matchday 2 | (Greece) Panathinaikos | 0–0 (A) | | |
| (Soviet Union) Dynamo Kyiv | 2–0 (A) | | | Matchday 3 | (Belgium) Anderlecht | 2–3 (A) | | |
| (Soviet Union) Dynamo Kyiv | 3–0 (H) | | | Matchday 4 | (Belgium) Anderlecht | 2–0 (H) | | |
| (Czechoslovakia) Sparta Prague | 0–1 (A) | | | Matchday 5 | (Socialist Federal Republic of Yugoslavia) Red Star Belgrade | 3–1 (A) | | |
| (Portugal) Benfica | 2–1 (H) | | | Matchday 6 | (Greece) Panathinaikos | 1–1 (H) | | |
| **Group B winner**: Pos / Team / Pld / Pts; **1** / (Spain) Barcelona / **6** / **9**; 2 / (Czechoslovakia) Sparta Prague / 6 / **6**; 3 / (Portugal) Benfica / 6 / **5**; 4 / (Commonwealth of Independent States) Dynamo Kyiv / 6 / **4**; Source: UEFA | | | | Final standings | **Group A winner**: Pos / Team / Pld / Pts; **1** / (Italy) Sampdoria / **6** / **8**; 2 / (Socialist Federal Republic of Yugoslavia) Red Star Belgrade / 6 / **6**; 3 / (Belgium) Anderlecht / 6 / **6**; 4 / (Greece) Panathinaikos / 6 / **4**; Source: UEFA | | | |

== Match ==
=== Details ===
20 May 1992
19:15 UTC+1

| Barcelona (Spain) | 1–0 (a.e.t.) | (Italy) Sampdoria |
|---|---|---|
| Koeman 112' | Report |

Wembley Stadium, London
Attendance: 70,827
Referee: Aron Schmidhuber (Germany)

| **Barcelona** | **Sampdoria** |

| GK | 1 | (Spain) Andoni Zubizarreta (c) |
| SW | 4 | (Netherlands) Ronald Koeman |
| CB | 3 | (Spain) Albert Ferrer |
| CB | 2 | (Spain) Nando |
| DM | 10 | (Spain) Pep Guardiola | | (substituted off) 112' |
| RWB | 11 | (Spain) Eusebio Sacristán |
| LWB | 5 | (Spain) Juan Carlos |
| AM | 6 | (Spain) José Mari Bakero | (yellow card) 75' |
| AM | 9 | (Denmark) Michael Laudrup |
| SS | 8 | (Bulgaria) Hristo Stoichkov |
| CF | 7 | (Spain) Julio Salinas | | (substituted off) 65' |
Substitutes:
| DF | 12 | (Spain) José Ramón Alexanko | | (substituted on) 112' |
| GK | 13 | (Spain) Carles Busquets |
| FW | 14 | (Spain) Txiki Begiristain |
| MF | 15 | (Spain) Miguel Ángel Nadal |
| MF | 16 | (Spain) Jon Andoni Goikoetxea | | (substituted on) 65' |
Manager:
(Netherlands) Johan Cruyff

| GK | 1 | (Italy) Gianluca Pagliuca |
| RB | 2 | (Italy) Moreno Mannini | (yellow card) 39' |
| CB | 5 | (Italy) Pietro Vierchowod | (yellow card) 66' |
| CB | 6 | (Italy) Marco Lanna |
| LB | 3 | (Slovenia) Srečko Katanec |
| RM | 7 | (Italy) Attilio Lombardo |
| CM | 4 | (Italy) Fausto Pari |
| CM | 8 | (Brazil) Toninho Cerezo |
| LM | 11 | (Italy) Ivano Bonetti | | (substituted off) 73' |
| CF | 10 | (Italy) Roberto Mancini (c) | (yellow card) 118' |
| CF | 9 | (Italy) Gianluca Vialli | | (substituted off) 100' |
Substitutes:
| GK | 12 | (Italy) Giulio Nuciari |
| DF | 13 | (Italy) Dario Bonetti |
| MF | 14 | (Italy) Giovanni Invernizzi | | (substituted on) 73' |
| MF | 15 | (Brazil) Paulo Silas |
| MF | 16 | (Italy) Renato Buso | | (substituted on) 100' |
Manager:
(Federal Republic of Yugoslavia) Vujadin Boškov

Assistant referees:
Joachim Ren (Germany)
Uwe Ennuschat (Germany)
Fourth official:
Karl-Josef Assenmacher (Germany)

**Match rules**

- 90 minutes.
- 30 minutes of extra time if necessary.
- Penalty shoot-out if scores still level.
- Five named substitutes.
- Maximum of two substitutions.

== Impact on Barcelona ==
In Catalonia, the victory is often regarded as a turning point in Barcelona's history. After 1992, including the La Liga title won two weeks after the final, Barcelona finished first in the league 13 times over the following 25 years, compared with 11 titles in the previous 92 years. The club also won four additional European Cups, bringing their total to five. Some observers view Cruyff's "Dream Team" and Koeman's winning goal as important foundations for the later success of the club, including the era of Pep Guardiola, Xavi Hernández, and Andrés Iniesta.

== See also ==
- 1989 European Cup Winners' Cup final – contested by the same teams
- 1991–92 FC Barcelona season
- 1991–92 UC Sampdoria season
- 1992 European Cup Winners' Cup final
- 1992 European Super Cup
- 1992 UEFA Cup final
- FC Barcelona in international football
- UC Sampdoria in European football
