= Wankdorf Stadium =

Football stadium in Bern, Switzerland

Coordinates: 46°57′46″N 7°27′54″E

Wankdorfstadion
- Wankdorf Stadium
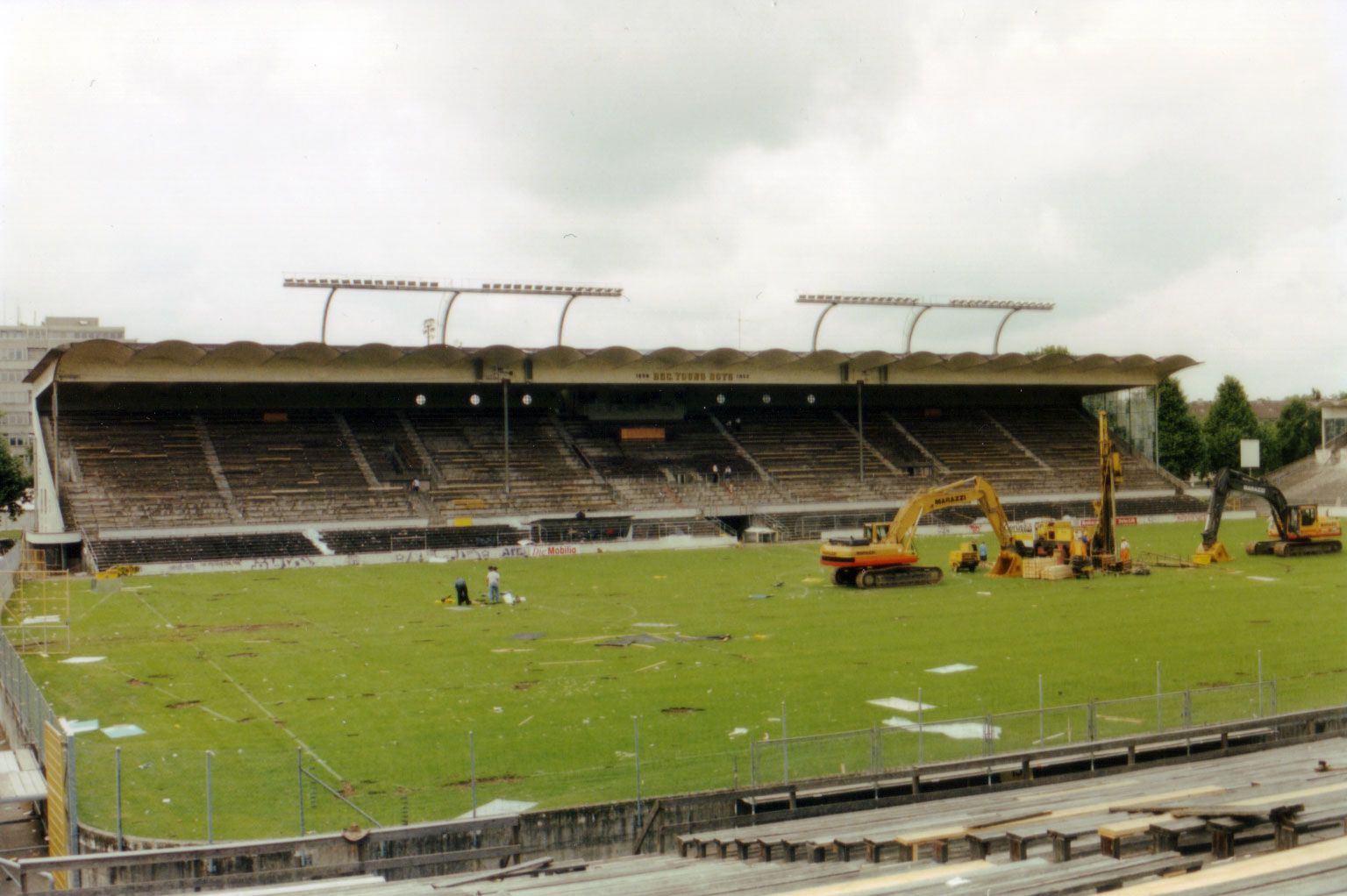
- The stadium during demolition in 2001
- Interactive map of Wankdorfstadion
- Location: Papiermühlestrasse 71; CH-3014 Bern
- Capacity: 22,000–64,000 (football)
- Surface: Grass

Construction
- Groundbreaking: 1925
- Opened: 18 October 1925
- Closed: 7 July 2001
- Demolished: 3 August 2001

Tenant
- BSC Young Boys (1925–2001)

Wankdorf Stadium (German: Wankdorfstadion, pronounced [ˈvaŋkdɔʁfˌʃtaːdi̯ɔn]) was a football stadium in Bern, Switzerland, and the home of Swiss club BSC Young Boys. Built in 1925, it hosted the finals of the 1954 FIFA World Cup, the 1960–61 European Cup, and the 1988–89 European Cup Winners' Cup.

The stadium was demolished in 2001, and replaced in 2005 by the Stadion Wankdorf on the same site.

== History ==
The original Wankdorf stadium was opened in 1925 after a construction period of seven months. It had a capacity of 22,000, of which 1,200 covered seats and covered standing room for another 5,000 people. The first international match took place on 8 November 1925; 18,000 spectators witnessed the 2–0 victory of the Swiss national team against Austria.

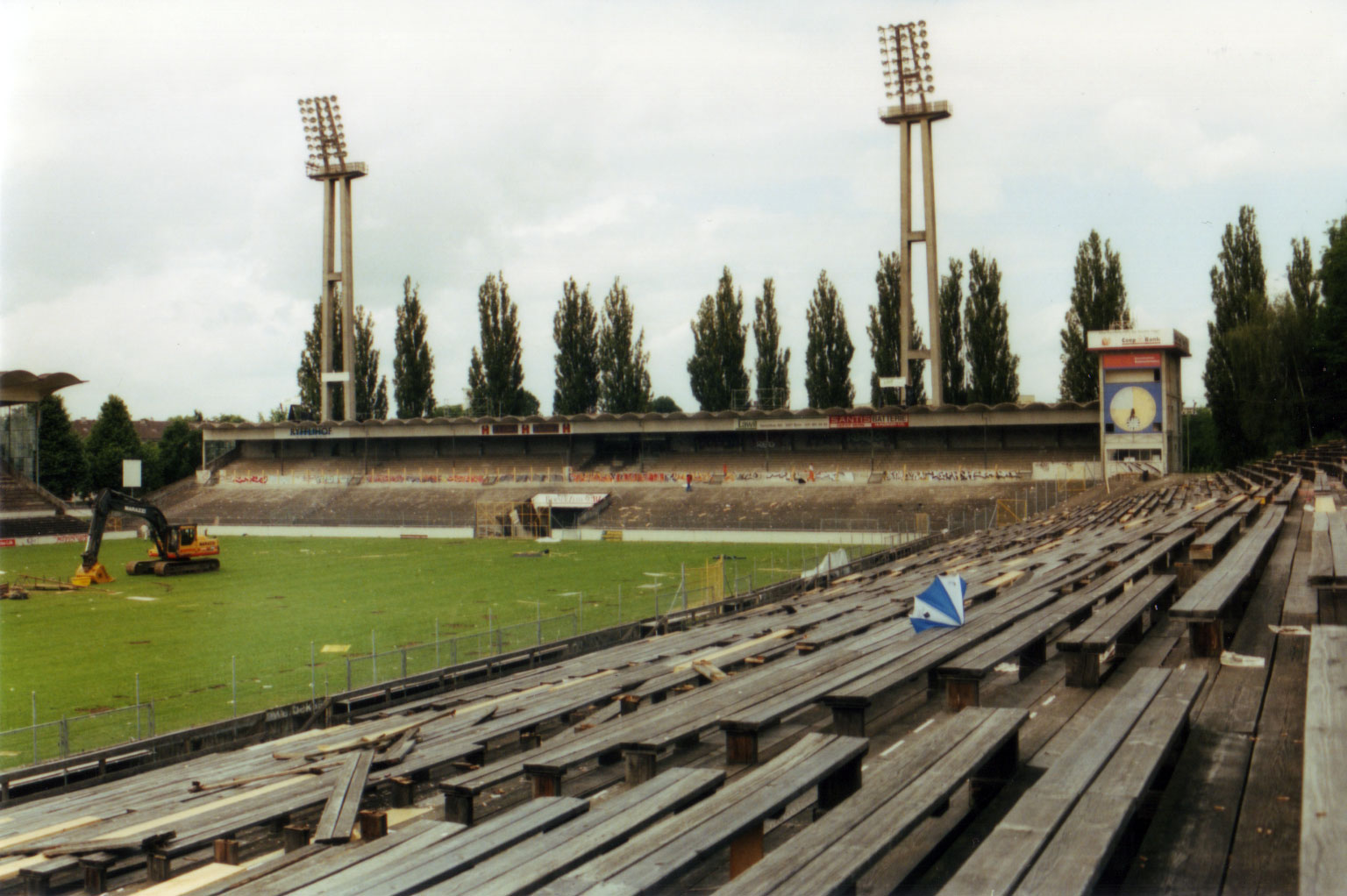
The seats and in the background the trademark floodlight masts and one of the clock towers during demolition in 2001

From 1933 to 1939, the stadium was gradually enlarged with an additional training field and finally the construction of bleachers across from the grandstand, increasing the capacity to 42,000. For the 1954 FIFA World Cup, the stadium was demolished and a new one with a capacity of 64,000 spectators (on 8,000 seats and standing room for 56,000) was inaugurated shortly before the tournament began. On 4 July 1954, the legendary "Miracle of Bern", the unexpected 3–2 victory of the German team over the Hungarians in the final, made the stadium an icon of football history.

The stadium saw two more major finals: in 1961, the final of the European Cup was played in the Wankdorf stadium. S.L. Benfica won 3–2 against FC Barcelona on 31 May. In 1989, the stadium was the venue of the final of the Cup Winners' Cup: on 10 May, FC Barcelona won 2–0 against U.C. Sampdoria.

The stadium was demolished in 2001, and a new stadium was constructed in its place. The last match in the stadium was played on 7 July 2001; Young Boys played 1–1 against the team of Lugano in a match in the Swiss Super League. The final blasting of the derelict edifice occurred on 3 August 2001.

The new Stade de Suisse, Wankdorf, opened in summer 2005 and was one of the venues for Euro 2008.

The band Muse credits Wankdorf stadium as inspiring the aptly named 'Wankdorf Jam'.

== 1954 FIFA World Cup ==
Wankdorf Stadium hosted five games of the 1954 FIFA World Cup, including the final matches.

| Date | Time (UTC+01) | Team No. 1 | Res. | Team No. 2 | Round | Attendance |
|---|---|---|---|---|---|---|
| 16 June 1954 | 18:00 | Uruguay | 2–0 | Czechoslovakia | Group 3 | 20,500 |
| 17 June 1954 | 18:00 | West Germany | 4–1 | Turkey | Group 2 | 28,000 |
| 20 June 1954 | 17:10 | England | 2–0 | Switzerland | Group 4 | 43,119 |
| 27 June 1954 | 17:00 | Hungary | 4–2 | Brazil | Quarter-finals | 40,000 |
| 4 July 1954 | 17:00 | West Germany | 3–2 | Hungary | Final | 62,500 |

== See also ==
- List of football stadiums in Switzerland

| Preceded by Estádio do Maracanã; Rio de Janeiro | FIFA World Cup; Final venue 1954 | Succeeded by Råsunda Stadium; Stockholm |
| Preceded by Hampden Park; Glasgow | European Cup; Final venue 1961 | Succeeded by Olympic Stadium; Amsterdam |
| Preceded by Stade de la Meinau; Strasbourg | European Cup Winners' Cup; Final venue 1989 | Succeeded by Ullevi; Gothenburg |
