= 1990 European Cup Winners' Cup final =

- Match programme cover
- Event: 1989–90 European Cup Winners' Cup
Sampdoria	Anderlecht
(Italy)	(Belgium)
2	0
- After extra time
- Date: 9 May 1990
- Venue: Ullevi, Gothenburg
- Referee: Bruno Galler (Switzerland)
- Attendance: 20,103

The 1990 European Cup Winners' Cup Final was a football match contested between Sampdoria of Italy and Anderlecht of Belgium. It was the final match of the 1989–90 European Cup Winners' Cup and the 30th European Cup Winners' Cup final. The final was held at Ullevi in Gothenburg, Sweden, on 9 May 1990. Sampdoria won the match 2–0, thanks to two goals in extra time from Gianluca Vialli.

== Route to the final ==
(Italy) Sampdoria				Round	(Belgium) Anderlecht			
Opponent	Agg.	1st leg	2nd leg		Opponent	Agg.	1st leg	2nd leg
(Norway) Brann	3–0	2–0 (A)	1–0 (H)	First round	(Northern Ireland) Ballymena United	10–0	6–0 (H)	4–0 (A)
(West Germany) Borussia Dortmund	3–1	1–1 (A)	2–0 (H)	Second round	(Spain) Barcelona	3–2	2–0 (H)	1–2 (A)
(Switzerland) Grasshopper	4–1	2–0 (H)	2–1 (A)	Quarter-finals	(Austria) Admira	3–1	2–0 (H)	1–1 (A)
(France) Monaco	4–2	2–2 (A)	2–0 (H)	Semi-finals	(Romania) Dinamo București	2–0	1–0 (H)	1–0 (A)

== Match ==
=== Details ===
9 May 1990
20:15 CEST

Sampdoria (Italy)	2–0 (a.e.t.)	(Belgium) Anderlecht
Vialli 105', 107'	Report

Ullevi, Gothenburg
Attendance: 20,103
Referee: Bruno Galler (Switzerland)

Sampdoria	Anderlecht

GK	1	(Italy) Gianluca Pagliuca
RB	2	(Italy) Moreno Mannini	(yellow card) 38'
LB	3	(Italy) Amedeo Carboni	(yellow card) 36'
CM	4	(Italy) Fausto Pari
CB	5	(Italy) Pietro Vierchowod
CB	6	(Italy) Luca Pellegrini (c)
RM	7	(Italy) Giovanni Invernizzi		(substituted off) 55'
CM	8	(Socialist Federal Republic of Yugoslavia) Srečko Katanec		(substituted off) 92'
CF	9	(Italy) Gianluca Vialli
CF	10	(Italy) Roberto Mancini
LM	11	(Italy) Giuseppe Dossena
Substitutes:
GK	12	(Italy) Giulio Nuciari
DF	13	(Italy) Marco Lanna
MF	14	(Italy) Attilio Lombardo		(substituted on) 55'
MF	15	(Italy) Fausto Salsano		(substituted on) 92'
MF	16	(Spain) Víctor Muñoz
Manager:
(Socialist Federal Republic of Yugoslavia) Vujadin Boškov

GK	1	(Belgium) Filip De Wilde
RB	2	(Belgium) Georges Grün (c)
LB	3	(Belgium) Guy Marchoul
CB	4	(Nigeria) Stephen Keshi	(yellow card) 29'
CB	5	(Netherlands) Wim Kooiman
CM	6	(Zambia) Charly Musonda
LM	7	(Belgium) Patrick Vervoort
RM	8	(Iceland) Arnór Guðjohnsen
CF	9	(Belgium) Marc Degryse		(substituted off) 103'
CM	10	(Socialist Federal Republic of Yugoslavia) Milan Janković		(substituted off) 116'
CF	11	(Belgium) Marc Van Der Linden
Substitutes:
GK	12	(Socialist Federal Republic of Yugoslavia) Ranko Stojić
DF	13	(Belgium) Donald Van Durme
FW	14	(Belgium) Luc Nilis		(substituted on) 103'
FW	15	(Belgium) Luís Oliveira		(substituted on) 116'
MF	16	(Belgium) Gert Verheyen
Manager:
(Netherlands) Aad de Mos

Assistant referees:
Serge Muhmenthaler (Switzerland)
Marco Raveglia (Switzerland)
Fourth official:
Bo Karlsson (Sweden)

Match rules

- 90 minutes.
- 30 minutes of extra time if necessary.
- Penalty shoot-out if scores still level.
- Five named substitutes.
- Maximum of two substitutions.

== See also ==
- 1989–90 European Cup Winners' Cup
- 1990 European Cup Final
- 1990 UEFA Cup Final
- R.S.C. Anderlecht in European football
- U.C. Sampdoria in European football
