= 2012 Faroe Islands Cup =

2012 Løgmannsteypið
Tournament details
- Country: Faroe Islands
- Teams: 18

Final positions
- Champions: Víkingur Gøta
- Runners-up: EB/Streymur

Tournament statistics
- Matches played: 19
- Goals scored: 91 (4.79 per match)
- Top goal scorer: John Poulsen (5 goals)

The 2012 Faroe Islands Cup was the 58th edition of the Faroe Islands domestic football cup. It started on 24 March 2012 and ended with the final on 25 August 2012. EB/Streymur were the defending champions, having won their fourth cup title the previous year. The winner of the competition qualified for the first qualifying round of the 2013–14 UEFA Europa League.

Only the first teams of Faroese football clubs were allowed to participate. The preliminary round involved only teams from 1. deild, 2. deild and 3. deild competitions. Teams from the highest division entered the competition in the first round.

== Preliminary round ==
Three clubs from the 2. deild and one club from the 3. deild entered this round. The matches took place on 24 March 2012. The draw for this round of the competition was made on 13 February 2012.

Team 1	Score	Team 2
FF Giza/FC Hoyvík	3–2	MB Miðvágur
Undrið FF	1–0	Royn Hvalba

== First round ==
The two winners from the preliminary round, all ten clubs from the Faroe Islands Premier League and four clubs from the 1. deild entered this round. These matches took place on 9 April 2012. The draw for this round of the competition was made on 13 February 2012.

Team 1	Score	Team 2
Undrið FF	5–5 (a.e.t.); 3–5 (p)	B71 Sandoy
KÍ Klaksvík	4–2	NSÍ Runavík
FC Suðuroy	5–0	Skála ÍF
Argja Bóltfelag	5–2	FF Giza/FC Hoyvík
TB Tvøroyri	1–3	HB Tórshavn
B68 Toftir	2–1	07 Vestur
Víkingur Gøta	1–0	B36 Tórshavn
ÍF Fuglafjørður	2–4	EB/Streymur

== Quarter-finals ==
The matches took place on 25 April 2012.

Team 1	Score	Team 2
AB Argir	1–3	EB/Streymur
KÍ Klaksvík	3–5 (a.e.t.)	HB Tórshavn
FC Suðuroy	5–1	B71 Sandoy
B68 Toftir	1–2	Víkingur Gøta

== Semi-finals ==
The ties were played over two legs on 9 May and 23 May 2012.

Team 1	Agg.	Team 2	1st leg	2nd leg
Víkingur Gøta	2–2 (a)	FC Suðuroy	1–0	1–2
EB/Streymur	6–6 (a)	HB Tórshavn	4–1	2–5

== Final ==
25 August 2012
19:45 WEST

EB/Streymur	3–3 (a.e.t.)	Víkingur Gøta
Frederiksberg 31'; Hanssen 70' (pen.); Niclasen 95'	Report	H. J. Djurhuus 55'; Gregersen 78' (pen.); H. Hansen 111'
Penalties
Hanssen (penalty scored); Danielsen (penalty scored); Samuelsen (penalty scored); Anghel (penalty missed); M. Djurhuus (penalty scored); Tórgarð (penalty missed); A. Hansen (penalty missed)	4–5	(penalty scored) í Bartalstovu; (penalty missed) Gregersen; (penalty scored) H. Jacobsen; (penalty scored) Bassene; (penalty scored) Blé; (penalty missed) B. Hansen; (penalty scored) E. Jacobsen

Tórsvøllur, Tórshavn
Attendance: 2,579
Referee: Dagfinn Forná

== Top goalscorers ==
Rank	Player	Team	Goals
1	(Faroe Islands) John Poulsen	FC Suðuroy	5
2	(Faroe Islands) Sorin Anghel	EB/Streymur	4
3	(Faroe Islands) Arnbjørn Hansen	EB/Streymur	3
3	(Faroe Islands) Atli Gregersen	Víkingur	3
3	(Faroe Islands) Fróði Benjaminsen	HB	3
3	(Faroe Islands) Jón Poulsen	FC Suðuroy	3
3	(Faroe Islands) Levi Hanssen	EB/Streymur	3
3	(Faroe Islands) Símun Samuelsen	HB	3
3	(Faroe Islands) Thomas Hans Rubeksen	B71	3
