= 2014–15 UEFA Champions League qualifying =

European football tournament

2014–15 UEFA Champions League qualifying was the preliminary phase of the 2014–15 UEFA Champions League, prior to the competition proper. Qualification consisted of the qualifying phase (first to third rounds) and the play-off round. It was played from 1 July to 27 August 2014. A total of 55 teams competed in the qualifying phase and play-off round to decide 10 of the 32 places in the group stage.

All times were CEST (UTC+2).

== Round and draw dates ==
All draws were held at UEFA headquarters in Nyon, Switzerland.

Round	Draw date and time	First leg	Second leg
First qualifying round	23 June 2014, 12:00	1–2 July 2014	8–9 July 2014
Second qualifying round	23 June 2014, 12:00	15–16 July 2014	22–23 July 2014
Third qualifying round	18 July 2014, 12:00	29–30 July 2014	5–6 August 2014
Play-off round	8 August 2014, 12:00	19–20 August 2014	26–27 August 2014

== Format ==
In the qualifying phase and play-off round, each tie was played over two legs, with each team playing one leg at home. The team that scored more goals on aggregate over the two legs advanced to the next round. If the aggregate score was level, the away goals rule was applied, i.e. the team that scored more goals away from home over the two legs advanced. If away goals were also equal, then 30 minutes of extra time were played. The away goals rule was again applied after extra time, i.e. if there were goals scored during extra time and the aggregate score was still level, the visiting team advanced by virtue of more away goals scored. If no goals were scored during extra time, the tie was decided by a penalty shoot-out.

In the draws for each round, teams were seeded based on their UEFA club coefficients at the beginning of the season, with the teams divided into seeded and unseeded pots. A seeded team was drawn against an unseeded team, with the order of legs in each tie decided randomly. Due to the limited time between matches, the draws for the second and third qualifying rounds took place before the results of the previous round were known. For these draws (or in any cases where the result of a tie in the previous round was not known at the time of the draw), the seeding was carried out under the assumption that the team with the higher coefficient of an undecided tie advanced to this round, which meant if the team with the lower coefficient was to advanced, it simply took the seeding of its defeated opponent. Prior to the draws, UEFA could form "groups" in accordance with the principles set by the Club Competitions Committee, but they were purely for convenience of the draw and for ensuring that teams from the same association were not drawn against each other, and did not resemble any real groupings in the sense of the competition.

== Teams ==
There were two routes which the teams were separated into during qualifying:

- Champions Route, which included all domestic champions which did not automatically qualify for the group stage.
- League Route (also called the Non-champions Path or the Best-placed Path), which included all domestic non-champions which did not automatically qualify for the group stage.

A total of 55 teams (40 in Champions Route, 15 in League Route) were involved in the qualifying phase and play-off round. The 10 winners of the play-off round (5 in Champions Route, 5 in League Route) advanced to the group stage to join the 22 automatic qualifiers. The 15 losers of the third qualifying round entered the Europa League play-off round, and the 10 losers of the play-off round entered the Europa League group stage.

Below were the participating teams (with their 2014 UEFA club coefficients), grouped by their starting rounds.

Key to colours
Winners of the play-off round advanced to the group stage
Losers of the play-off round entered the Europa League group stage
Losers of the third qualifying round entered the Europa League play-off round

=== Champions Route ===
Third qualifying round
Team	Coeff
(Austria) Red Bull Salzburg	46.185
(Cyprus) APOEL	37.650
(Denmark) AaB	5.260

Second qualifying round
Team	Coeff
(Romania) Steaua București	39.451
(Scotland) Celtic	36.813
(Belarus) BATE Borisov	33.725
(Czech Republic) Sparta Prague	28.870
(Croatia) Dinamo Zagreb	23.925
(Bulgaria) Ludogorets Razgrad	18.125
(Israel) Maccabi Tel Aviv	17.875
(Moldova) Sheriff Tiraspol	17.075
(Slovenia) Maribor	16.200
(Poland) Legia Warsaw	15.275
(Serbia) Partizan	14.825
(Hungary) Debrecen	10.325
(Slovakia) Slovan Bratislava	8.700
(Kazakhstan) Aktobe	8.150
(Latvia) Ventspils	7.750
(Azerbaijan) Qarabağ	7.575
(Finland) HJK	7.435
(Georgia (country)) Dinamo Tbilisi	6.975
(Sweden) Malmö FF	6.265
(Iceland) KR	5.350
(Luxembourg) F91 Dudelange	4.975
(Norway) Strømsgodset	4.855
(Wales) The New Saints	4.850
(Republic of Ireland) St Patrick's Athletic	4.775
(Albania) Skënderbeu	4.600
(North Macedonia) Rabotnicki	4.550
(Malta) Valletta	4.466
(Bosnia and Herzegovina) Zrinjski Mostar	4.000
(Northern Ireland) Cliftonville	3.225
(Lithuania) Žalgiris	3.050
(Montenegro) Sutjeska	2.450

First qualifying round
Team	Coeff
(Estonia) Levadia Tallinn	4.575
(Faroe Islands) HB	3.175
(Andorra) FC Santa Coloma	2.166
(Armenia) Banants	1.325
(San Marino) La Fiorita	0.699
(Gibraltar) Lincoln Red Imps	0.000

=== League Route ===
Play-off round
Team	Coeff
(England) Arsenal	112.949
(Portugal) Porto	105.459
(Germany) Bayer Leverkusen	70.328
(Italy) Napoli	61.387
(Spain) Athletic Bilbao	54.542

Third qualifying round
Team	Coeff
(Russia) Zenit Saint Petersburg	73.899
(France) Lille	45.300
(Denmark) Copenhagen	45.260
(Belgium) Standard Liège	38.260
(Turkey) Beşiktaş	32.840
(Ukraine) Dnipro Dnipropetrovsk	32.193
(Greece) Panathinaikos	30.220
(Netherlands) Feyenoord	13.362
(Switzerland) Grasshopper	9.645
(Cyprus) AEL Limassol	7.650

== First qualifying round ==
=== Seeding ===
A total of six teams played in the first qualifying round. The draw was held on 23 June 2014.

Seeded	Unseeded
(Estonia) Levadia Tallinn (Faroe Islands) HB (Andorra) FC Santa Coloma	(Armenia) Banants (San Marino) La Fiorita (Gibraltar) Lincoln Red Imps

=== Summary ===
The first legs were played on 1 and 2 July, and the second legs were played on 8 July 2014.

Team 1	Agg.	Team 2	1st leg	2nd leg
FC Santa Coloma (Andorra)	3–3 (a)	(Armenia) Banants	1–0	2–3
Lincoln Red Imps (Gibraltar)	3–6	(Faroe Islands) HB	1–1	2–5
La Fiorita (San Marino)	0–8	(Estonia) Levadia Tallinn	0–1	0–7

=== Matches ===
1 July 2014
20:00

FC Santa Coloma (Andorra)	1–0	(Armenia) Banants
Pujol 5'	Report

Estadi Comunal, Andorra la Vella
Attendance: 323
Referee: Jens Maae (Denmark)
8 July 2014
16:00

Banants (Armenia)	3–2	(Andorra) FC Santa Coloma
R. Hovsepyan 29', 56' (pen.); Mashumyan 47'	Report	Lima 20'; Casals 90+4'

Football Academy Stadium, Yerevan
Attendance: 1,400
Referee: Nikolay Yordanov (Bulgaria)

3–3 on aggregate; FC Santa Coloma won on away goals.

2 July 2014
20:00

Lincoln Red Imps (Gibraltar)	1–1	(Faroe Islands) HB
J. Chipolina 18' (pen.)	Report	Hanssen 71'

Victoria Stadium, Gibraltar
Attendance: 1,821
Referee: Alexandre Boucaut (Belgium)
8 July 2014
20:00

HB (Faroe Islands)	5–2	(Gibraltar) Lincoln Red Imps
Hanssen 11', 81'; Jensen 25'; Edmundsson 34'; Benjaminsen 88'	Report	Cabrera 50'; J. Duarte 77'

Tórsvøllur, Tórshavn
Attendance: 1,068
Referee: Vadims Direktorenko (Latvia)

HB won 6–3 on aggregate.

1 July 2014
20:30

La Fiorita (San Marino)	0–1	(Estonia) Levadia Tallinn
	Report	Tamm 90+3'

Stadio Olimpico, Serravalle
Attendance: 438
Referee: Dejan Jakimovski (Macedonia)
8 July 2014
18:00

Levadia Tallinn (Estonia)	7–0	(San Marino) La Fiorita
Kulinitš 7'; Subbotin 30', 72'; Elhussieny 48'; Artjunin 75', 90+2'; Tipurić 85'	Report

Kadriorg Stadium, Tallinn
Attendance: 1,455
Referee: Chris Reisch (Luxembourg)

Levadia Tallinn won 8–0 on aggregate.

== Second qualifying round ==
=== Seeding ===
A total of 34 teams played in the second qualifying round: 31 teams which entered in this round, and the three winners of the first qualifying round. The draw was held on 23 June 2014.

Group 1		Group 2		Group 3	
Seeded	Unseeded	Seeded	Unseeded	Seeded	Unseeded
(Belarus) BATE Borisov (Israel) Maccabi Tel Aviv (Moldova) Sheriff Tiraspol (Slovenia) Maribor (Kazakhstan) Aktobe	(Georgia (country)) Dinamo Tbilisi (Albania) Skënderbeu (Bosnia and Herzegovina) Zrinjski Mostar (Montenegro) Sutjeska (Andorra) FC Santa Coloma	(Scotland) Celtic (Czech Republic) Sparta Prague (Serbia) Partizan (Hungary) Debrecen (Slovakia) Slovan Bratislava (Latvia) Ventspils	(Sweden) Malmö FF (Iceland) KR (Wales) The New Saints (Estonia) Levadia Tallinn (Northern Ireland) Cliftonville (Faroe Islands) HB	(Romania) Steaua București (Croatia) Dinamo Zagreb (Bulgaria) Ludogorets Razgrad (Poland) Legia Warsaw (Azerbaijan) Qarabağ (Finland) HJK	(Luxembourg) F91 Dudelange (Norway) Strømsgodset (Republic of Ireland) St Patrick's Athletic (North Macedonia) Rabotnicki (Malta) Valletta (Lithuania) Žalgiris

Notes

1. ^{†} Winners of the first qualifying round, whose identity was not known at the time of the draw.

=== Summary ===
The first legs were played on 15 and 16 July, and the second legs were played on 22 and 23 July 2014.

Team 1	Agg.	Team 2	1st leg	2nd leg
BATE Borisov (Belarus)	1–1 (a)	(Albania) Skënderbeu	0–0	1–1
FC Santa Coloma (Andorra)	0–3 (Note: Order of legs reversed after original draw, due to the 2014 Israel–Gaza conflict.)	(Israel) Maccabi Tel Aviv	0–1	0–2
Dinamo Tbilisi (Georgia (country))	0–4	(Kazakhstan) Aktobe	0–1	0–3
Zrinjski Mostar (Bosnia and Herzegovina)	0–2	(Slovenia) Maribor	0–0	0–2
Sheriff Tiraspol (Moldova)	5–0	(Montenegro) Sutjeska	2–0	3–0
Sparta Prague (Czech Republic)	8–1	(Estonia) Levadia Tallinn	7–0	1–1
Malmö FF (Sweden)	1–0	(Latvia) Ventspils	0–0	1–0
Slovan Bratislava (Slovakia)	3–0	(Wales) The New Saints	1–0	2–0
KR (Iceland)	0–5 (Note: Order of legs reversed after original draw.)	(Scotland) Celtic	0–1	0–4
Cliftonville (Northern Ireland)	0–2	(Hungary) Debrecen	0–0	0–2
Partizan (Serbia)	6–1	(Faroe Islands) HB	3–0	3–1
Legia Warsaw (Poland)	6–1	(Republic of Ireland) St Patrick's Athletic	1–1	5–0
Rabotnicki (North Macedonia)	1–2	(Finland) HJK	0–0	1–2
Dinamo Zagreb (Croatia)	4–0	(Lithuania) Žalgiris	2–0	2–0
Ludogorets Razgrad (Bulgaria)	5–1	(Luxembourg) F91 Dudelange	4–0	1–1
Valletta (Malta)	0–5	(Azerbaijan) Qarabağ	0–1	0–4
Strømsgodset (Norway)	0–3	(Romania) Steaua București	0–1	0–2

=== Matches ===
15 July 2014
19:00

BATE Borisov (Belarus)	0–0	(Albania) Skënderbeu
	Report

Borisov Arena, Barysaw
Attendance: 12,671
Referee: Georgi Kabakov (Bulgaria)
22 July 2014
20:00

Skënderbeu (Albania)	1–1	(Belarus) BATE Borisov
Radaš 67'	Report	Khagush 29'

Skënderbeu Stadium, Korçë
Attendance: 6,200
Referee: Ante Vučemilović-Šimunović Jr. (Croatia)

1–1 on aggregate; BATE Borisov won on away goals.

15 July 2014
20:00

FC Santa Coloma (Andorra)	0–1	(Israel) Maccabi Tel Aviv
	Report	Prica 64'

Estadi Comunal, Andorra la Vella
Attendance: 494
Referee: Lasha Silagava (Georgia)
22 July 2014
19:30

Maccabi Tel Aviv (Israel)	2–0	(Andorra) FC Santa Coloma
Zahavi 62' (pen.); Ben Haim 90'	Report

Antonis Papadopoulos Stadium, Larnaca, Cyprus (Note: On 17 July 2014, the UEFA Emergency Panel decided that Israeli clubs must play their home legs outside of the country "until further notice" due to the 2014 Israel–Gaza conflict.)
Attendance: 100
Referee: Ioannis Anastasiou (Cyprus)

Maccabi Tel Aviv won 3–0 on aggregate.

16 July 2014
19:00

Dinamo Tbilisi (Georgia (country))	0–1	(Kazakhstan) Aktobe
	Report	Danilo Neco 51'

Boris Paichadze Dinamo Arena, Tbilisi
Attendance: 10,100
Referee: Paweł Raczkowski (Poland)
23 July 2014
17:00

Aktobe (Kazakhstan)	3–0	(Georgia (country)) Dinamo Tbilisi
Antonov 75'; Zyankovich 82'; Aimbetov 90+4'	Report

Aktobe Central Stadium, Aktobe
Attendance: 12,100
Referee: Aliyar Aghayev (Azerbaijan)

Aktobe won 4–0 on aggregate.

15 July 2014
19:30

Zrinjski Mostar (Bosnia and Herzegovina)	0–0	(Slovenia) Maribor
	Report

Stadion pod Bijelim Brijegom, Mostar
Attendance: 5,100
Referee: Carlos del Cerro Grande (Spain)
23 July 2014
20:00

Maribor (Slovenia)	2–0	(Bosnia and Herzegovina) Zrinjski Mostar
Vršič 45'; Ibraimi 57' (pen.)	Report

Ljudski vrt, Maribor
Attendance: 7,500
Referee: Sergey Lapochkin (Russia)

Maribor won 2–0 on aggregate.

15 July 2014
19:00

Sheriff Tiraspol (Moldova)	2–0	(Montenegro) Sutjeska
Mureșan 71'; Isa 87'	Report

Sheriff Stadium, Tiraspol
Attendance: 6,351
Referee: Clayton Pisani (Malta)
22 July 2014
17:30

Sutjeska (Montenegro)	0–3	(Moldova) Sheriff Tiraspol
	Report	Benson 5'; Luvannor 35'; Isa 54'

Stadion kraj Bistrice, Nikšić
Attendance: 1,450
Referee: Alexander Harkam (Austria)

Sheriff Tiraspol won 5–0 on aggregate.

15 July 2014
20:45

Sparta Prague (Czech Republic)	7–0	(Estonia) Levadia Tallinn
Lafata 22', 44', 45+4' (pen.), 57', 60'; Tipurić 55' (o.g.); Přikyl 84'	Report

Generali Arena, Prague
Attendance: 10,152
Referee: Arnold Hunter (Northern Ireland)
22 July 2014
18:00

Levadia Tallinn (Estonia)	1–1	(Czech Republic) Sparta Prague
Teever 68'	Report	Mareček 38'

Kadriorg Stadium, Tallinn
Attendance: 1,150
Referee: Antonio Damato (Italy)

Sparta Prague won 8–1 on aggregate.

16 July 2014
19:00

Malmö FF (Sweden)	0–0	(Latvia) Ventspils
	Report

Swedbank Stadion, Malmö
Attendance: 8,831
Referee: Antti Munukka (Finland)
23 July 2014
18:00

Ventspils (Latvia)	0–1	(Sweden) Malmö FF
	Report	Kiese Thelin 19'

Ventspils Olimpiskais Stadions, Ventspils
Attendance: 3,000
Referee: Kristo Tohver (Estonia)

Malmö FF won 1–0 on aggregate.

15 July 2014
18:45

Slovan Bratislava (Slovakia)	1–0	(Wales) The New Saints
Čikoš 52'	Report

Štadión Pasienky, Bratislava
Attendance: 4,838
Referee: Pavle Radovanović (Montenegro)
22 July 2014
19:45

The New Saints (Wales)	0–2	(Slovakia) Slovan Bratislava
	Report	Milinković 74', 89'

Belle Vue, Rhyl (Note: The New Saints played their home match at Belle Vue, Rhyl, instead of their regular stadium Park Hall, Oswestry.)
Attendance: 1,140
Referee: Jakob Kehlet (Denmark)

Slovan Bratislava won 3–0 on aggregate.

15 July 2014
21:00

KR (Iceland)	0–1	(Scotland) Celtic
	Report	McGregor 84'

KR-völlur, Reykjavík
Attendance: 1,520
Referee: Andreas Pappas (Greece)
22 July 2014
20:45

Celtic (Scotland)	4–0	(Iceland) KR
Van Dijk 13', 20'; Pukki 27', 71'	Report

Murrayfield Stadium, Edinburgh (Note: The match was played at Murrayfield Stadium, Edinburgh as Celtic's home stadium, Celtic Park, Glasgow, was used for the 2014 Commonwealth Games.)
Attendance: 39,099
Referee: Andris Treimanis (Latvia)

Celtic won 5–0 on aggregate.

15 July 2014
20:45

Cliftonville (Northern Ireland)	0–0	(Hungary) Debrecen
	Report

Solitude, Belfast
Attendance: 1,750
Referee: Artur Soares Dias (Portugal)
22 July 2014
20:30

Debrecen (Hungary)	2–0	(Northern Ireland) Cliftonville
Mihelič 55'; Sidibe 79'	Report

Nagyerdei Stadion, Debrecen
Attendance: 9,457
Referee: Vlado Glođović (Serbia)

Debrecen won 2–0 on aggregate.

15 July 2014
20:45

Partizan (Serbia)	3–0	(Faroe Islands) HB
Lazović 14', 64'; Škuletić 71'	Report

Partizan Stadium, Belgrade
Attendance: 11,758
Referee: Sven Bindels (Luxembourg)
22 July 2014
20:00

HB (Faroe Islands)	1–3	(Serbia) Partizan
Wardum 35'	Report	Ninković 49'; Lazović 75'; Grbić 90+1'

Tórsvøllur, Tórshavn
Attendance: 1,150
Referee: Dimitar Meckarovski (Macedonia)

Partizan won 6–1 on aggregate.

16 July 2014
20:45

Legia Warsaw (Poland)	1–1	(Republic of Ireland) St Patrick's Athletic
Radović 90+1'	Report	Fagan 38'

Polish Army Stadium, Warsaw
Attendance: 11,075
Referee: Marius Avram (Romania)
23 July 2014
20:45

St Patrick's Athletic (Republic of Ireland)	0–5	(Poland) Legia Warsaw
	Report	Radović 25', 82'; Żyro 69'; Saganowski 87'; Byrne 90+2' (o.g.)

Tallaght Stadium, Tallaght (Note: St Patrick's Athletic played their home match at Tallaght Stadium, instead of their regular stadium Richmond Park.)
Attendance: 5,500
Referee: Andreas Ekberg (Sweden)

Legia Warsaw won 6–1 on aggregate.

15 July 2014
20:00

Rabotnicki (North Macedonia)	0–0	(Finland) HJK
	Report

Philip II Arena, Skopje
Attendance: 1,500
Referee: Tamás Bognár (Hungary)
23 July 2014
18:00

HJK (Finland)	2–1	(North Macedonia) Rabotnicki
Lod 22'; Moren 26'	Report	Vujčić 47'

Sonera Stadium, Helsinki
Attendance: 10,153
Referee: Neil Doyle (Republic of Ireland)

HJK won 2–1 on aggregate.

15 July 2014
20:45

Dinamo Zagreb (Croatia)	2–0	(Lithuania) Žalgiris
Soudani 58'; Antolić 70'	Report

Stadion Maksimir, Zagreb
Attendance: 4,211
Referee: Anthony Taylor (England)
22 July 2014
20:15

Žalgiris (Lithuania)	0–2	(Croatia) Dinamo Zagreb
	Report	Soudani 46'; Šimunić 49'

LFF Stadium, Vilnius
Attendance: 4,000
Referee: Artyom Kuchin (Kazakhstan)

Dinamo Zagreb won 4–0 on aggregate.

16 July 2014
19:00

Ludogorets Razgrad (Bulgaria)	4–0	(Luxembourg) F91 Dudelange
Dani Abalo 35'; Bezjak 43'; Anicet 65'; Espinho 68'	Report

Ludogorets Arena, Razgrad
Attendance: 4,104
Referee: Richard Trutz (Slovakia)
22 July 2014
18:00

F91 Dudelange (Luxembourg)	1–1	(Bulgaria) Ludogorets Razgrad
Turpel 81'	Report	Bezjak 51'

Stade Jos Nosbaum, Dudelange
Attendance: 842
Referee: Tobias Welz (Germany)

Ludogorets Razgrad won 5–1 on aggregate.

15 July 2014
18:30

Valletta (Malta)	0–1	(Azerbaijan) Qarabağ
	Report	Chumbinho 18'

Ta' Qali National Stadium, Ta' Qali
Attendance: 1,200
Referee: Adrien Jaccottet (Switzerland)
22 July 2014
18:30

Qarabağ (Azerbaijan)	4–0	(Malta) Valletta
Reynaldo 15'; Chumbinho 48'; Dias 57'; George 80'	Report

Tofiq Bahramov Republican Stadium, Baku
Attendance: 23,350
Referee: Sergey Tsinkevich (Belarus)

Qarabağ won 5–0 on aggregate.

16 July 2014
19:30

Strømsgodset (Norway)	0–1	(Romania) Steaua București
	Report	Iancu 49'

Marienlyst Stadion, Drammen
Attendance: 5,056
Referee: Serdar Gözübüyük (Netherlands)
23 July 2014
19:30

Steaua București (Romania)	2–0	(Norway) Strømsgodset
Râpă 72'; Stanciu 84'	Report

Arena Națională, Bucharest
Attendance: 25,000
Referee: Eitan Shemeulevitch (Israel)

Steaua București won 3–0 on aggregate.

== Third qualifying round ==
=== Seeding ===
A total of 30 teams played in the third qualifying round:

- Champions Route: three teams which entered in this round, and the 17 winners of the second qualifying round.
- League Route: ten teams which entered in this round.

The draw was held on 18 July 2014.

Champions Route				League Route	
Group 1		Group 2		League Route	
Seeded	Unseeded	Seeded	Unseeded	Seeded	Unseeded
(Austria) Red Bull Salzburg (Scotland) Celtic (Belarus) BATE Borisov (Croatia) Dinamo Zagreb (Moldova) Sheriff Tiraspol	(Poland) Legia Warsaw (Hungary) Debrecen (Slovakia) Slovan Bratislava (Azerbaijan) Qarabağ (Denmark) AaB	(Romania) Steaua București (Cyprus) APOEL (Czech Republic) Sparta Prague (Bulgaria) Ludogorets Razgrad (Israel) Maccabi Tel Aviv	(Slovenia) Maribor (Serbia) Partizan (Kazakhstan) Aktobe (Sweden) Malmö FF (Finland) HJK	(Russia) Zenit Saint Petersburg (France) Lille (Denmark) Copenhagen (Belgium) Standard Liège (Turkey) Beşiktaş	(Ukraine) Dnipro Dnipropetrovsk (Greece) Panathinaikos (Netherlands) Feyenoord (Switzerland) Grasshopper (Cyprus) AEL Limassol

Notes

1. ^{†} Winners of the second qualifying round, whose identity was not known at the time of the draw. Teams in italics defeated a team with a higher coefficient in the second qualifying round, thus effectively taking the coefficient of their defeated opponent in the draw for the third qualifying round.
2. ^{‡} On 17 July 2014, the UEFA emergency panel ruled that Ukrainian and Russian clubs would not be drawn against each other "until further notice" due to the political unrest between the countries. Therefore, Russian club Zenit Saint Petersburg and Ukrainian club Dnipro Dnipropetrovsk could not be drawn into the same tie.

=== Summary ===
The first legs were played on 29 and 30 July, and the second legs were played on 5 and 6 August 2014.

Team 1	Agg.	Team 2	1st leg	2nd leg
Champions Route
Qarabağ (Azerbaijan)	2–3	(Austria) Red Bull Salzburg	2–1	0–2
Debrecen (Hungary)	2–3	(Belarus) BATE Borisov	1–0	1–3
Slovan Bratislava (Slovakia)	2–1	(Moldova) Sheriff Tiraspol	2–1	0–0
AaB (Denmark)	2–1	(Croatia) Dinamo Zagreb	0–1	2–0
Legia Warsaw (Poland)	4–4 (a)	(Scotland) Celtic	4–1	0–3 (Note: Because of a clerical error by Legia Warsaw involving Bartosz Bereszyński, who was suspended for three matches as a result of a red card on matchday 6 of the 2013–14 UEFA Europa League group stage, UEFA awarded Celtic a 3–0 win. The error involved Legia Warsaw not registering the suspended player for the St. Patrick's Athletic tie the previous round, which meant those two matches did not count towards his suspension. The original match had ended in a 2–0 win for Legia Warsaw.)
Aktobe (Kazakhstan)	3–4	(Romania) Steaua București	2–2	1–2
Maribor (Slovenia)	3–2	(Israel) Maccabi Tel Aviv	1–0	2–2
HJK (Finland)	2–4	(Cyprus) APOEL	2–2	0–2
Sparta Prague (Czech Republic)	4–4 (a)	(Sweden) Malmö FF	4–2	0–2
Ludogorets Razgrad (Bulgaria)	2–2 (a)	(Serbia) Partizan	0–0	2–2
League Route
AEL Limassol (Cyprus)	1–3	(Russia) Zenit Saint Petersburg	1–0	0–3
Dnipro Dnipropetrovsk (Ukraine)	0–2	(Denmark) Copenhagen	0–0	0–2
Feyenoord (Netherlands)	2–5	(Turkey) Beşiktaş	1–2	1–3
Grasshopper (Switzerland)	1–3	(France) Lille	0–2	1–1
Standard Liège (Belgium)	2–1	(Greece) Panathinaikos	0–0	2–1

=== Champions Route matches ===
30 July 2014
17:30

Qarabağ (Azerbaijan)	2–1	(Austria) Red Bull Salzburg
Dias 2'; Reynaldo 86'	Report	Soriano 77'

Tofiq Bahramov Republican Stadium, Baku
Attendance: 31,000
Referee: Serhiy Boyko (Ukraine)
6 August 2014
20:30

Red Bull Salzburg (Austria)	2–0	(Azerbaijan) Qarabağ
Hinteregger 18', 34'	Report

Red Bull Arena, Wals-Siezenheim
Attendance: 20,716
Referee: Bobby Madden (Scotland)

Red Bull Salzburg won 3–2 on aggregate.

29 July 2014
20:30

Debrecen (Hungary)	1–0	(Belarus) BATE Borisov
Sidibe 56' (pen.)	Report

Nagyerdei Stadion, Debrecen
Attendance: 10,191
Referee: Szymon Marciniak (Poland)
5 August 2014
19:30

BATE Borisov (Belarus)	3–1	(Hungary) Debrecen
A. Valadzko 39'; Rodionov 66'; Krivets 90+4'	Report	Sidibe 20' (pen.)

Borisov Arena, Barysaw
Attendance: 12,788
Referee: Stefan Johannesson (Sweden)

BATE Borisov won 3–2 on aggregate.

29 July 2014
20:15

Slovan Bratislava (Slovakia)	2–1	(Moldova) Sheriff Tiraspol
Žofčák 42' (pen.); Mészáros 85'	Report	Ricardinho 74'

Štadión Pasienky, Bratislava
Attendance: 6,711
Referee: Stephan Studer (Switzerland)
6 August 2014
19:00

Sheriff Tiraspol (Moldova)	0–0	(Slovakia) Slovan Bratislava
	Report

Sheriff Stadium, Tiraspol
Attendance: 8,753
Referee: István Vad (Hungary)

Slovan Bratislava won 2–1 on aggregate.

30 July 2014
20:15

AaB (Denmark)	0–1	(Croatia) Dinamo Zagreb
	Report	Brozović 49'

Nordjyske Arena, Aalborg
Attendance: 9,438
Referee: Danny Makkelie (Netherlands)
6 August 2014
20:45

Dinamo Zagreb (Croatia)	0–2	(Denmark) AaB
	Report	Jacobsen 36', 85'

Stadion Maksimir, Zagreb
Attendance: 8,235
Referee: Yevhen Aranovskyi (Ukraine)

AaB won 2–1 on aggregate.

30 July 2014
20:45

Legia Warsaw (Poland)	4–1	(Scotland) Celtic
Radović 10', 36'; Żyro 84'; Kosecki 90+1'	Report	McGregor 8'

Polish Army Stadium, Warsaw
Attendance: 22,265
Referee: Pol van Boekel (Netherlands)
6 August 2014
20:45

Celtic (Scotland)	3–0 Awarded (Note: The Celtic v Legia Warsaw second leg, which originally finished as a 2–0 win for Legia Warsaw (6–1 on aggregate), was forfeited because of a clerical error by Legia Warsaw regarding Bartosz Bereszyński, who had been suspended for three UEFA club competition matches as a result of a red card on matchday 6 of the 2013–14 UEFA Europa League group stage against Apollon Limassol. Normally, he would have been suspended for the two legs against St. Patrick's Athletic and the first leg of the Celtic; however, Legia Warsaw failed to register Bereszyński for the St. Patrick's Athletic matches, meaning he would have had to sit out both legs of this match and the first leg of the next UEFA match. Bereszyński entered the second leg in the 86th minute as an illegal substitute because his suspension had not been legally served; Celtic were therefore awarded the second leg 3–0. Therefore, the tie finished 4–4 on aggregate, with Celtic winning on away goals.)	(Poland) Legia Warsaw
	Report	Żyro 36'; Kucharczyk 61'

Murrayfield Stadium, Edinburgh
Attendance: 35,000
Referee: Paolo Mazzoleni (Italy)

4–4 on aggregate; Celtic won on away goals.

30 July 2014
17:00

Aktobe (Kazakhstan)	2–2	(Romania) Steaua București
Korobkin 58'; Arzumanyan 87'	Report	Keșerü 44'; Prepeliță 78'

Aktobe Central Stadium, Aktobe
Attendance: 12,200
Referee: Hüseyin Göçek (Turkey)
6 August 2014
19:30

Steaua București (Romania)	2–1	(Kazakhstan) Aktobe
Chipciu 3'; Stanciu 39'	Report	Kapadze 85'

Arena Națională, Bucharest
Attendance: 24,386
Referee: Miroslav Zelinka (Czech Republic)

Steaua București won 4–3 on aggregate.

30 July 2014
20:30

Maribor (Slovenia)	1–0	(Israel) Maccabi Tel Aviv
Bohar 90+4'	Report

Ljudski vrt, Maribor
Attendance: 8,120
Referee: Ivan Kružliak (Slovakia)
5 August 2014
20:00

Maccabi Tel Aviv (Israel)	2–2	(Slovenia) Maribor
Ben Haim 42'; Ben Basat 54'	Report	Ibraimi 36', 55'

Antonis Papadopoulos Stadium, Larnaca, Cyprus
Attendance: 752
Referee: Martin Strömbergsson (Sweden)

Maribor won 3–2 on aggregate.

30 July 2014
18:00

HJK (Finland)	2–2	(Cyprus) APOEL
Savage 11', 45+1' (pen.)	Report	De Vincenti 71'; Sheridan 74'

Sonera Stadium, Helsinki
Attendance: 10,189
Referee: Paweł Gil (Poland)
6 August 2014
18:30

APOEL (Cyprus)	2–0	(Finland) HJK
Sheridan 17'; De Vincenti 43' (pen.)	Report

GSP Stadium, Nicosia
Attendance: 14,271
Referee: Liran Liany (Israel)

APOEL won 4–2 on aggregate.

29 July 2014
19:30

Sparta Prague (Czech Republic)	4–2	(Sweden) Malmö FF
Lafata 22', 51', 70'; Kováč 52'	Report	Forsberg 17'; Kiese Thelin 27'

Generali Arena, Prague
Attendance: 12,833
Referee: Halis Özkahya (Turkey)
6 August 2014
19:00

Malmö FF (Sweden)	2–0	(Czech Republic) Sparta Prague
Rosenberg 35', 55'	Report

Swedbank Stadion, Malmö
Attendance: 19,322
Referee: Ruddy Buquet (France)

4–4 on aggregate; Malmö FF won on away goals.

30 July 2014
20:00

Ludogorets Razgrad (Bulgaria)	0–0	(Serbia) Partizan
	Report

Ludogorets Arena, Razgrad
Attendance: 6,000
Referee: Kenn Hansen (Denmark)
6 August 2014
20:45

Partizan (Serbia)	2–2	(Bulgaria) Ludogorets Razgrad
Škuletić 30', 35'	Report	Marcelinho 19', 21'

Partizan Stadium, Belgrade
Attendance: 18,504
Referee: Aleksei Kulbakov (Belarus)

2–2 on aggregate; Ludogorets Razgrad won on away goals.

=== League Route matches ===
30 July 2014
18:00

AEL Limassol (Cyprus)	1–0	(Russia) Zenit Saint Petersburg
Gikiewicz 64'	Report

Antonis Papadopoulos Stadium, Larnaca
Attendance: 6,700
Referee: Marijo Strahonja (Croatia)
6 August 2014
18:00

Zenit Saint Petersburg (Russia)	3–0	(Cyprus) AEL Limassol
Rondón 55'; Danny 88'; Kerzhakov 90' (pen.)	Report

Petrovsky Stadium, Saint Petersburg
Attendance: 15,417
Referee: Alexandru Tudor (Romania)

Zenit Saint Petersburg won 3–1 on aggregate.

30 July 2014
18:00 (Note: The match was delayed for 15 minutes before the start of the second half due to fan violence.)

Dnipro Dnipropetrovsk (Ukraine)	0–0	(Denmark) Copenhagen
	Report

Olympic Stadium, Kyiv (Note: The match was played at Olympic Stadium, Kyiv instead of Dnipro Dnipropetrovsk's home stadium, Dnipro-Arena, Dnipropetrovsk, due to the pro-Russian unrest in Ukraine.)
Attendance: 23,410
Referee: Andre Marriner (England)
6 August 2014
20:00

Copenhagen (Denmark)	2–0	(Ukraine) Dnipro Dnipropetrovsk
Cornelius 36'; Kadrii 52'	Report

Parken Stadium, Copenhagen
Attendance: 18,875
Referee: Duarte Gomes (Portugal)

Copenhagen won 2–0 on aggregate.

30 July 2014
20:00

Feyenoord (Netherlands)	1–2	(Turkey) Beşiktaş
Te Vrede 90+5' (pen.)	Report	Pektemek 13'; Kerim 71'

De Kuip, Rotterdam
Attendance: 44,000
Referee: Luca Banti (Italy)
6 August 2014
19:30

Beşiktaş (Turkey)	3–1	(Netherlands) Feyenoord
Ba 28', 80', 86'	Report	Manu 74'

Atatürk Olympic Stadium, Istanbul
Attendance: 40,489
Referee: Felix Zwayer (Germany)

Beşiktaş won 5–2 on aggregate.

30 July 2014
19:00

Grasshopper (Switzerland)	0–2	(France) Lille
	Report	Corchia 29'; Mendes 49'

Letzigrund, Zürich
Attendance: 7,700
Referee: Aleksei Eskov (Russia)
5 August 2014
20:30

Lille (France)	1–1	(Switzerland) Grasshopper
Balmont 19'	Report	Abrashi 33'

Stade Pierre-Mauroy, Villeneuve-d'Ascq
Attendance: 24,882
Referee: Anastasios Sidiropoulos (Greece)

Lille won 3–1 on aggregate.

30 July 2014
20:00

Standard Liège (Belgium)	0–0	(Greece) Panathinaikos
	Report

Stade Maurice Dufrasne, Liège
Attendance: 18,483
Referee: Carlos Clos Gómez (Spain)
5 August 2014
20:00

Panathinaikos (Greece)	1–2	(Belgium) Standard Liège
Arslanagić 17' (o.g.)	Report	Mbombo 36'; M'Poku 42'

Leoforos Alexandras Stadium, Athens
Attendance: 14,227
Referee: Michael Oliver (England)

Standard Liège won 2–1 on aggregate.

== Play-off round ==
=== Seeding ===
A total of 20 teams played in the play-off round:

- Champions Route: the ten Champions Route winners of the third qualifying round.
- League Route: five teams which entered in this round, and the five League Route winners of the third qualifying round.

The draw was held on 8 August 2014.

Champions Route		League Route	
Seeded	Unseeded	Seeded	Unseeded
(Austria) Red Bull Salzburg (Romania) Steaua București (Cyprus) APOEL (Scotland) Celtic (Belarus) BATE Borisov	(Bulgaria) Ludogorets Razgrad (Slovenia) Maribor (Slovakia) Slovan Bratislava (Sweden) Malmö FF (Denmark) AaB	(England) Arsenal (Portugal) Porto (Russia) Zenit Saint Petersburg (Germany) Bayer Leverkusen (Italy) Napoli	(Spain) Athletic Bilbao (France) Lille (Denmark) Copenhagen (Belgium) Standard Liège (Turkey) Beşiktaş

=== Summary ===
The first legs were played on 19 and 20 August, and the second legs were played on 26 and 27 August 2014.

Team 1	Agg.	Team 2	1st leg	2nd leg
Champions Route
Maribor (Slovenia)	2–1	(Scotland) Celtic	1–1	1–0
Red Bull Salzburg (Austria)	2–4	(Sweden) Malmö FF	2–1	0–3
AaB (Denmark)	1–5	(Cyprus) APOEL	1–1	0–4
Steaua București (Romania)	1–1 (5–6 p)	(Bulgaria) Ludogorets Razgrad	1–0	0–1 (a.e.t.)
Slovan Bratislava (Slovakia)	1–4	(Belarus) BATE Borisov	1–1	0–3
League Route
Beşiktaş (Turkey)	0–1	(England) Arsenal	0–0	0–1
Standard Liège (Belgium)	0–4	(Russia) Zenit Saint Petersburg	0–1	0–3
Copenhagen (Denmark)	2–7	(Germany) Bayer Leverkusen	2–3	0–4
Lille (France)	0–3	(Portugal) Porto	0–1	0–2
Napoli (Italy)	2–4	(Spain) Athletic Bilbao	1–1	1–3

=== Champions Route matches ===
20 August 2014
20:45

Maribor (Slovenia)	1–1	(Scotland) Celtic
Bohar 14'	Report	McGregor 6'

Ljudski vrt, Maribor
Attendance: 11,025
Referee: Pavel Královec (Czech Republic)
26 August 2014
20:45

Celtic (Scotland)	0–1	(Slovenia) Maribor
	Report	Tavares 75'

Celtic Park, Glasgow
Attendance: 55,415
Referee: Viktor Kassai (Hungary)

Maribor won 2–1 on aggregate.

19 August 2014
20:45

Red Bull Salzburg (Austria)	2–1	(Sweden) Malmö FF
Schiemer 16'; Soriano 54'	Report	Forsberg 90'

Red Bull Arena, Wals-Siezenheim
Attendance: 29,110
Referee: Nicola Rizzoli (Italy)
27 August 2014
20:45

Malmö FF (Sweden)	3–0	(Austria) Red Bull Salzburg
Rosenberg 11' (pen.), 84'; Eriksson 19'	Report

Swedbank Stadion, Malmö
Attendance: 20,361
Referee: Damir Skomina (Slovenia)

Malmö FF won 4–2 on aggregate.

20 August 2014
20:45

AaB (Denmark)	1–1	(Cyprus) APOEL
Thomsen 16'	Report	Vinícius 54'

Nordjyske Arena, Aalborg
Attendance: 9,663
Referee: Martin Atkinson (England)
26 August 2014
20:45

APOEL (Cyprus)	4–0	(Denmark) AaB
Vinícius 29'; De Vincenti 44'; Aloneftis 64'; Sheridan 75'	Report

GSP Stadium, Nicosia
Attendance: 18,746
Referee: Willie Collum (Scotland)

APOEL won 5–1 on aggregate.

19 August 2014
20:45

Steaua București (Romania)	1–0	(Bulgaria) Ludogorets Razgrad
Chipciu 88'	Report

Arena Națională, Bucharest
Attendance: 35,342
Referee: Felix Brych (Germany)
27 August 2014
20:45

Ludogorets Razgrad (Bulgaria)	1–0 (a.e.t.)	(Romania) Steaua București
Wanderson 90'	Report
Penalties
Moți (penalty scored); Wanderson (penalty missed); Hamza (penalty scored); Caiçara (penalty scored); Marcelinho (penalty scored); Dyakov (penalty scored); Espinho (penalty scored)	6–5	(penalty scored) Keșerü; (penalty missed) Pîrvulescu; (penalty scored) Szukała; (penalty scored) Popa; (penalty scored) Varela; (penalty scored) Prepeliță; (penalty missed) Râpă

Vasil Levski National Stadium, Sofia (Note: Match played their at Vasil Levski National Stadium, Sofia, instead of Ludogorets' regular stadium Ludogorets Arena, Razgrad.)
Attendance: 16,995
Referee: Alberto Undiano Mallenco (Spain)

1–1 on aggregate; Ludogorets Razgrad won 6–5 on penalties.

20 August 2014
20:45

Slovan Bratislava (Slovakia)	1–1	(Belarus) BATE Borisov
Vittek 80'	Report	Jablonský 44' (o.g.)

Štadión Pasienky, Bratislava
Attendance: 8,461
Referee: Olegário Benquerença (Portugal)
26 August 2014
20:45

BATE Borisov (Belarus)	3–0	(Slovakia) Slovan Bratislava
Gordeichuk 41'; Krivets 84'; Rodionov 85'	Report

Borisov Arena, Barysaw
Attendance: 12,970
Referee: Wolfgang Stark (Germany)

BATE Borisov won 4–1 on aggregate.

=== League Route matches ===
19 August 2014
20:45

Beşiktaş (Turkey)	0–0	(England) Arsenal
	Report

Atatürk Olympic Stadium, Istanbul
Attendance: 41,531
Referee: Milorad Mažić (Serbia)
27 August 2014
20:45

Arsenal (England)	1–0	(Turkey) Beşiktaş
Sánchez 45+1'	Report

Emirates Stadium, London
Attendance: 59,946
Referee: Pedro Proença (Portugal)

Arsenal won 1–0 on aggregate.

20 August 2014
20:45

Standard Liège (Belgium)	0–1	(Russia) Zenit Saint Petersburg
	Report	Shatov 16'

Stade Maurice Dufrasne, Liège
Attendance: 14,435
Referee: Craig Thomson (Scotland)
26 August 2014
18:00

Zenit Saint Petersburg (Russia)	3–0	(Belgium) Standard Liège
Rondón 30'; Hulk 54' (pen.), 58'	Report

Petrovsky Stadium, Saint Petersburg
Attendance: 16,017
Referee: Gianluca Rocchi (Italy)

Zenit Saint Petersburg won 4–0 on aggregate.

19 August 2014
20:45

Copenhagen (Denmark)	2–3	(Germany) Bayer Leverkusen
M. Jørgensen 9'; Amartey 13'	Report	Kießling 5'; Bellarabi 31'; Son Heung-min 42'

Parken Stadium, Copenhagen
Attendance: 18,221
Referee: Carlos Velasco Carballo (Spain)
27 August 2014
20:45

Bayer Leverkusen (Germany)	4–0	(Denmark) Copenhagen
Son Heung-min 2'; Çalhanoğlu 7'; Kießling 31' (pen.), 65'	Report

BayArena, Leverkusen
Attendance: 23,321
Referee: Mark Clattenburg (England)

Bayer Leverkusen won 7–2 on aggregate.

20 August 2014
20:45

Lille (France)	0–1	(Portugal) Porto
	Report	Herrera 61'

Stade Pierre-Mauroy, Villeneuve-d'Ascq
Attendance: 33,853
Referee: Björn Kuipers (Netherlands)
26 August 2014
20:45

Porto (Portugal)	2–0	(France) Lille
Brahimi 49'; Martínez 69'	Report

Estádio do Dragão, Porto
Attendance: 45,208
Referee: Svein Oddvar Moen (Norway)

Porto won 3–0 on aggregate.

19 August 2014
20:45

Napoli (Italy)	1–1	(Spain) Athletic Bilbao
Higuaín 68'	Report	Muniain 41'

Stadio San Paolo, Naples
Attendance: 49,872
Referee: Jonas Eriksson (Sweden)
27 August 2014
20:45

Athletic Bilbao (Spain)	3–1	(Italy) Napoli
Aduriz 61', 69'; Ibai 74'	Report	Hamšík 47'

San Mamés, Bilbao
Attendance: 49,017
Referee: Cüneyt Çakır (Turkey)

Athletic Bilbao won 4–2 on aggregate.

== Statistics ==
There were 212 goals in 90 matches in the qualifying phase and play-off round, for an average of 2.36 goals per match.

=== Top goalscorers ===
Rank	Player	Team	Goals	Minutes played
1	(Czech Republic) David Lafata	(Czech Republic) Sparta Prague	8	262
2	(Serbia) Miroslav Radović	(Poland) Legia Warsaw	5	358
3	(Sweden) Markus Rosenberg	(Sweden) Malmö FF	4	540
4	(Germany) Stefan Kießling	(Germany) Bayer Leverkusen	3	163
4	(Faroe Islands) Levi Hanssen	(Faroe Islands) HB	3	270
4	(Senegal) Demba Ba	(Turkey) Beşiktaş	3	298
4	(Serbia) Danko Lazović	(Serbia) Partizan	3	305
4	(Republic of Ireland) Cillian Sheridan	(Cyprus) APOEL	3	329
4	(Argentina) Tomás De Vincenti	(Cyprus) APOEL	3	330
4	(Serbia) Petar Škuletić	(Serbia) Partizan	3	343
4	(Senegal) Ibrahima Sidibe	(Hungary) Debrecen	3	353
4	(Poland) Michał Żyro	(Poland) Legia Warsaw	3	354
4	(North Macedonia) Agim Ibraimi	(Slovenia) Maribor	3	519
4	(Scotland) Callum McGregor	(Scotland) Celtic	3	540

Source: UEFA.com

=== Top assists ===
Rank	Player	Team	Assists	Minutes played
1	(Poland) Michał Kucharczyk	(Poland) Legia Warsaw	3	234
1	(Czech Republic) Josef Hušbauer	(Czech Republic) Sparta Prague	3	249
1	(Kazakhstan) Marat Khairullin	(Kazakhstan) Aktobe	3	296
1	(Croatia) Domagoj Antolić	(Croatia) Dinamo Zagreb	3	311
1	(Argentina) Tomás De Vincenti	(Cyprus) APOEL	3	330
1	(Serbia) Darko Brašanac	(Serbia) Partizan	3	353
1	(Poland) Michał Żyro	(Poland) Legia Warsaw	3	354
1	(Brazil) Anderson Mineiro	(Kazakhstan) Aktobe	3	360
1	(Romania) Alexandru Chipciu	(Romania) Steaua București	3	445
1	(Romania) Adrian Popa	(Romania) Steaua București	3	448

Source: UEFA.com
