= 2014–15 UEFA Champions League =

European football tournament

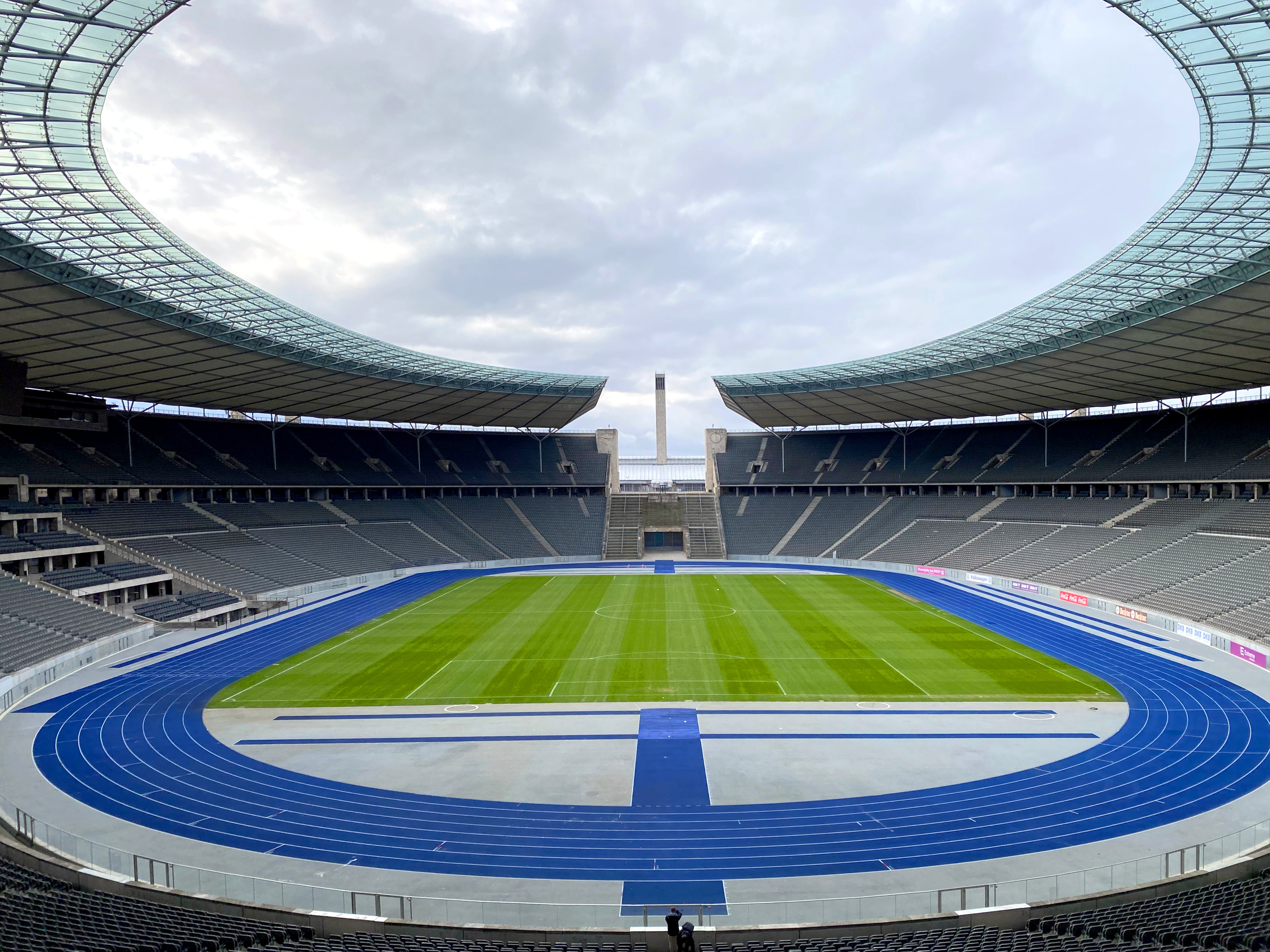
- The Olympiastadion in Berlin hosted the final

Tournament details
- Dates: Qualifying: 1 July – 27 August 2014; Competition proper: 16 September 2014 – 6 June 2015
- Teams: Competition proper: 32; Total: 77 (from 53 associations)

Final positions
- Champions: (Spain) Barcelona (5th title)
- Runners-up: (Italy) Juventus

Tournament statistics
- Matches played: 125
- Goals scored: 361 (2.89 per match)
- Attendance: 5,136,695 (41,094 per match)
- Top scorer(s): Lionel Messi (Barcelona); Neymar (Barcelona); Cristiano Ronaldo (Real Madrid); 10 goals each

The 2014–15 UEFA Champions League was the 60th season of Europe's premier club football tournament organised by UEFA, and the 23rd season since it was renamed from the European Champion Clubs' Cup to the UEFA Champions League.

The final was played at the Olympiastadion in Berlin, Germany, with Spanish side Barcelona defeating Italian side Juventus 3–1 to win their fifth title and complete an unprecedented second continental treble. Real Madrid were the title holders, but they were eliminated by Juventus in the semi-finals.

This season was the first where clubs must comply with UEFA Financial Fair Play Regulations in order to participate. Moreover, this season was the first where a club from Gibraltar competed in the tournament, after the Gibraltar Football Association was accepted as the 54th UEFA member at the UEFA Congress in May 2013. They were granted one spot in the Champions League, which was taken by Lincoln Red Imps, the champions of the 2013–14 Gibraltar Premier Division.

On 17 July 2014, the UEFA emergency panel ruled that Ukrainian and Russian clubs would not be drawn against each other "until further notice" due to the political unrest between the countries. Another ruling centred in regional instability was also made where Israeli teams were prohibited from hosting any UEFA competitions due to the 2014 Israel–Gaza conflict. The rules regarding suspension due to yellow card accumulation were also changed such that all bookings expired on completion of the quarter-finals and were not carried forward to the semi-finals. Moreover, this was the first season in which vanishing spray was used.

== Association team allocation ==
A total of 77 teams from 53 of the 54 UEFA member associations participated in the 2014–15 UEFA Champions League (the exception being Liechtenstein, which do not organise a domestic league). The association ranking based on the UEFA country coefficients was used to determine the number of participating teams for each association:

- Associations 1–3 each have four teams qualify.
- Associations 4–6 each have three teams qualify.
- Associations 7–15 each have two teams qualify.
- Associations 16–54 (except Liechtenstein) each have one team qualify.

The winners of the 2013–14 UEFA Champions League were given an additional entry as title holders if they would not qualify for the 2014–15 UEFA Champions League through their domestic league (because of the restriction that no association can have more than four teams playing in the Champions League, if the title holders are from the top three associations and finish outside the top four in their domestic league, the title holders' entry comes at the expense of the fourth-placed team of their association). However, this additional entry was not necessary for this season since the title holders qualified for the tournament through their domestic league.

=== Association ranking ===
For the 2014–15 UEFA Champions League, the associations are allocated places according to their 2013 UEFA country coefficients, which takes into account their performance in European competitions from 2008–09 to 2012–13.

Rank	Association	Coeff.	Teams
1	Spain	88.025	4
2	England	82.963	4
3	Germany	79.614	4
4	Italy	64.147	3
5	Portugal	59.168	3
6	France	59.000	3
7	Ukraine	49.758	2
8	Russia	46.332	2
9	Netherlands	44.729	2
10	Turkey	34.500	2
11	Belgium	34.400	2
12	Greece	34.000	2
13	Switzerland	28.925	2
14	Cyprus	26.833	2
15	Denmark	25.700	2
16	Austria	25.375	1
17	Czech Republic	23.725	1
18	Romania	23.024	1

Rank	Association	Coeff.	Teams
19	Israel	22.875	1
20	Belarus	20.875	1
21	Poland	20.750	1
22	Croatia	19.583	1
23	Sweden	15.625	1
24	Scotland	15.191	1
25	Serbia	14.625	1
26	Slovakia	14.208	1
27	Norway	14.175	1
28	Bulgaria	12.250	1
29	Hungary	11.750	1
30	Slovenia	9.708	1
31	Georgia	9.166	1
32	Azerbaijan	8.541	1
33	Finland	8.508	1
34	Bosnia and Herzegovina	7.833	1
35	Moldova	7.666	1
36	Republic of Ireland	7.375	1

Rank	Association	Coeff.	Teams
37	Lithuania	6.500	1
38	Kazakhstan	5.958	1
39	Latvia	5.791	1
40	Iceland	5.416	1
41	Montenegro	5.250	1
42	Macedonia	5.250	1
43	Albania	4.166	1
44	Malta	3.958	1
45	Liechtenstein	3.500	0
46	Luxembourg	3.375	1
47	Northern Ireland	3.083	1
48	Wales	2.583	1
49	Estonia	2.208	1
50	Armenia	1.750	1
51	Faroe Islands	1.583	1
52	San Marino	0.666	1
53	Andorra	0.500	1
54	Gibraltar	0.000	1

=== Distribution ===
Since the title holders Real Madrid qualified for the Champions League group stage through their domestic league (as the third-placed team of the 2013–14 La Liga), the group stage spot reserved for the title holders is vacated, and the following changes to the default allocation system are made:

- The champions of association 13 (Switzerland) are promoted from the third qualifying round to the group stage.
- The champions of association 16 (Austria) are promoted from the second qualifying round to the third qualifying round.
- The champions of associations 47 (Northern Ireland) and 48 (Wales) are promoted from the first qualifying round to the second qualifying round.

		Teams entering in this round	Teams advancing from previous round
First qualifying round (6 teams)		6 champions from associations 49–54	
Second qualifying round (34 teams)		31 champions from associations 17–48 (except Liechtenstein)	3 winners from the first qualifying round
Third qualifying round	Champions (20 teams)	3 champions from associations 14–16	17 winners from the second qualifying round
Third qualifying round	Non-champions (10 teams)	9 runners-up from associations 7–15; 1 third-placed team from association 6	
Play-off round	Champions (10 teams)		10 winners from the third qualifying round for champions
Play-off round	Non-champions (10 teams)	2 third-placed teams from associations 4–5; 3 fourth-placed teams from associations 1–3	5 winners from the third qualifying round for non-champions
Group stage (32 teams)		13 champions from associations 1–13; 6 runners-up from associations 1–6; 3 third-placed teams from associations 1–3	5 winners from the play-off round for champions; 5 winners from the play-off round for non-champions
Knockout phase (16 teams)			8 group winners from the group stage; 8 group runners-up from the group stage

=== Teams ===
League positions of the previous season shown in parentheses (TH: Title holders).

Group stage
(Spain) Real Madrid (3rd)^{TH}	(Germany) Bayern Munich (1st)	(Portugal) Sporting CP (2nd)	(Turkey) Galatasaray (2nd)
(Spain) Atlético Madrid (1st)	(Germany) Borussia Dortmund (2nd)	(France) Paris Saint-Germain (1st)	(Belgium) Anderlecht (1st)
(Spain) Barcelona (2nd)	(Germany) Schalke 04 (3rd)	(France) Monaco (2nd)	(Greece) Olympiacos (1st)
(England) Manchester City (1st)	(Italy) Juventus (1st)	(Ukraine) Shakhtar Donetsk (1st)	(Switzerland) Basel (1st)
(England) Liverpool (2nd)	(Italy) Roma (2nd)	(Russia) CSKA Moscow (1st)	
(England) Chelsea (3rd)	(Portugal) Benfica (1st)	(Netherlands) Ajax (1st)	
Play-off round
Champions	Non-champions		
	(Spain) Athletic Bilbao (4th)	(Germany) Bayer Leverkusen (4th)	(Portugal) Porto (3rd)
	(England) Arsenal (4th)	(Italy) Napoli (3rd)	
Third qualifying round
Champions	Non-champions		
(Cyprus) APOEL (1st)	(France) Lille (3rd)	(Turkey) Beşiktaş (3rd)	(Cyprus) AEL Limassol (2nd)
(Denmark) AaB (1st)	(Ukraine) Dnipro Dnipropetrovsk (2nd)	(Belgium) Standard Liège (2nd)	(Denmark) Copenhagen (2nd)
(Austria) Red Bull Salzburg (1st)	(Russia) Zenit Saint Petersburg (2nd)	(Greece) Panathinaikos (2nd)	
	(Netherlands) Feyenoord (2nd)	(Switzerland) Grasshopper (2nd)	
Second qualifying round
(Czech Republic) Sparta Prague (1st)	(Serbia) Partizan (2nd)	(Finland) HJK (1st)	(Montenegro) Sutjeska (1st)
(Romania) Steaua București (1st)	(Slovakia) Slovan Bratislava (1st)	(Bosnia and Herzegovina) Zrinjski Mostar (1st)	(North Macedonia) Rabotnicki (1st)
(Israel) Maccabi Tel Aviv (1st)	(Norway) Strømsgodset (1st)	(Moldova) Sheriff Tiraspol (1st)	(Albania) Skënderbeu (1st)
(Belarus) BATE Borisov (1st)	(Bulgaria) Ludogorets Razgrad (1st)	(Republic of Ireland) St Patrick's Athletic (1st)	(Malta) Valletta (1st)
(Poland) Legia Warsaw (1st)	(Hungary) Debrecen (1st)	(Lithuania) Žalgiris (1st)	(Luxembourg) F91 Dudelange (1st)
(Croatia) Dinamo Zagreb (1st)	(Slovenia) Maribor (1st)	(Kazakhstan) Aktobe (1st)	(Northern Ireland) Cliftonville (1st)
(Sweden) Malmö FF (1st)	(Georgia (country)) Dinamo Tbilisi (1st)	(Latvia) Ventspils (1st)	(Wales) The New Saints (1st)
(Scotland) Celtic (1st)	(Azerbaijan) Qarabağ (1st)	(Iceland) KR (1st)	
First qualifying round
(Estonia) Levadia Tallinn (1st)	(Faroe Islands) HB (1st)	(Andorra) FC Santa Coloma (1st)	
(Armenia) Banants (1st)	(San Marino) La Fiorita (1st)	(Gibraltar) Lincoln Red Imps (1st)	

Notes

1. Serbia (SRB): Red Star Belgrade, the champions of the 2013–14 Serbian SuperLiga, would have qualified for the Champions League second qualifying round, but were banned by UEFA for breaching UEFA Club Licensing and Financial Fair Play Regulations. As a result, the berth was given to Partizan, the runners-up of the league.
2. Turkey (TUR): Fenerbahçe, the champions of the 2013–14 Süper Lig, would have qualified for the Champions League group stage, but were banned by UEFA because of the 2011 Turkish sports corruption scandal. As a result, Galatasaray, the runners-up of the league, entered the group stage instead of the third qualifying round, and the third qualifying round berth was given to Beşiktaş, the third-placed team of the league.

== Round and draw dates ==
The schedule of the competition was as follows (all draws were held at UEFA headquarters in Nyon, Switzerland, unless stated otherwise).

Phase	Round	Draw date	First leg	Second leg
Qualifying	First qualifying round	23 June 2014	1–2 July 2014	8–9 July 2014
Qualifying	Second qualifying round	23 June 2014	15–16 July 2014	22–23 July 2014
Qualifying	Third qualifying round	18 July 2014	29–30 July 2014	5–6 August 2014
Play-off	Play-off round	8 August 2014	19–20 August 2014	26–27 August 2014
Group stage	Matchday 1	28 August 2014 (Monaco)	16–17 September 2014	
Group stage	Matchday 2	28 August 2014 (Monaco)	30 September–1 October 2014	
Group stage	Matchday 3	28 August 2014 (Monaco)	21–22 October 2014	
Group stage	Matchday 4	28 August 2014 (Monaco)	4–5 November 2014	
Group stage	Matchday 5	28 August 2014 (Monaco)	25–26 November 2014	
Group stage	Matchday 6	28 August 2014 (Monaco)	9–10 December 2014	
Knockout phase	Round of 16	15 December 2014	17–18 & 24–25 February 2015	10–11 & 17–18 March 2015
Knockout phase	Quarter-finals	20 March 2015	14–15 April 2015	21–22 April 2015
Knockout phase	Semi-finals	24 April 2015	5–6 May 2015	12–13 May 2015
Knockout phase	Final	24 April 2015	6 June 2015 at Olympiastadion, Berlin	

The final date of 6 June could cause problems for South American international players called up to play in the 2015 Copa América, which begins on 11 June. FIFA international rules require clubs to release players 14 days prior to the start of an international tournament, which means the players would have to miss the Champions League final if the rules were enforced. If the players were allowed to play in the Champions League final, that would leave them as few as five days to travel and train prior to playing in the Copa América.

== Qualifying rounds ==
In the qualifying rounds and the play-off round, teams were divided into seeded and unseeded teams based on their 2014 UEFA club coefficients, and then drawn into two-legged home-and-away ties. Teams from the same association could not be drawn against each other.

=== First qualifying round ===
The draw for the first and second qualifying rounds was held on 23 June 2014. The first legs were played on 1 and 2 July, and the second legs were played on 8 July 2014.

Team 1	Agg.	Team 2	1st leg	2nd leg
FC Santa Coloma (Andorra)	3–3 (a)	(Armenia) Banants	1–0	2–3
Lincoln Red Imps (Gibraltar)	3–6	(Faroe Islands) HB	1–1	2–5
La Fiorita (San Marino)	0–8	(Estonia) Levadia Tallinn	0–1	0–7

=== Second qualifying round ===
The first legs were played on 15 and 16 July, and the second legs were played on 22 and 23 July 2014.

Team 1	Agg.	Team 2	1st leg	2nd leg
BATE Borisov (Belarus)	1–1 (a)	(Albania) Skënderbeu	0–0	1–1
FC Santa Coloma (Andorra)	0–3 (Note: Order of legs reversed after original draw, due to the 2014 Israel–Gaza conflict.)	(Israel) Maccabi Tel Aviv	0–1	0–2
Dinamo Tbilisi (Georgia (country))	0–4	(Kazakhstan) Aktobe	0–1	0–3
Zrinjski Mostar (Bosnia and Herzegovina)	0–2	(Slovenia) Maribor	0–0	0–2
Sheriff Tiraspol (Moldova)	5–0	(Montenegro) Sutjeska	2–0	3–0
Sparta Prague (Czech Republic)	8–1	(Estonia) Levadia Tallinn	7–0	1–1
Malmö FF (Sweden)	1–0	(Latvia) Ventspils	0–0	1–0
Slovan Bratislava (Slovakia)	3–0	(Wales) The New Saints	1–0	2–0
KR (Iceland)	0–5 (Note: Order of legs reversed after original draw.)	(Scotland) Celtic	0–1	0–4
Cliftonville (Northern Ireland)	0–2	(Hungary) Debrecen	0–0	0–2
Partizan (Serbia)	6–1	(Faroe Islands) HB	3–0	3–1
Legia Warsaw (Poland)	6–1	(Republic of Ireland) St Patrick's Athletic	1–1	5–0
Rabotnicki (North Macedonia)	1–2	(Finland) HJK	0–0	1–2
Dinamo Zagreb (Croatia)	4–0	(Lithuania) Žalgiris	2–0	2–0
Ludogorets Razgrad (Bulgaria)	5–1	(Luxembourg) F91 Dudelange	4–0	1–1
Valletta (Malta)	0–5	(Azerbaijan) Qarabağ	0–1	0–4
Strømsgodset (Norway)	0–3	(Romania) Steaua București	0–1	0–2

=== Third qualifying round ===
The third qualifying round was split into two separate sections: one for champions (Champions Route) and one for non-champions (League Route). The losing teams in both sections entered the 2014–15 UEFA Europa League play-off round.

The draw for the third qualifying round was held on 18 July 2014. The first legs were played on 29 and 30 July, and the second legs were played on 5 and 6 August 2014.

Team 1	Agg.	Team 2	1st leg	2nd leg
Champions Route
Qarabağ (Azerbaijan)	2–3	(Austria) Red Bull Salzburg	2–1	0–2
Debrecen (Hungary)	2–3	(Belarus) BATE Borisov	1–0	1–3
Slovan Bratislava (Slovakia)	2–1	(Moldova) Sheriff Tiraspol	2–1	0–0
AaB (Denmark)	2–1	(Croatia) Dinamo Zagreb	0–1	2–0
Legia Warsaw (Poland)	4–4 (a)	(Scotland) Celtic	4–1	0–3 (Note: Because of a clerical error by Legia Warsaw involving Bartosz Bereszyński, who was suspended for three matches as a result of a red card on matchday 6 of the 2013–14 UEFA Europa League group stage, UEFA awarded Celtic a 3–0 win. The error involved Legia Warsaw not registering the suspended player for the St. Patrick's Athletic tie the previous round, which meant those two matches did not count towards his suspension. The original match had ended in a 2–0 win for Legia Warsaw.)
Aktobe (Kazakhstan)	3–4	(Romania) Steaua București	2–2	1–2
Maribor (Slovenia)	3–2	(Israel) Maccabi Tel Aviv	1–0	2–2
HJK (Finland)	2–4	(Cyprus) APOEL	2–2	0–2
Sparta Prague (Czech Republic)	4–4 (a)	(Sweden) Malmö FF	4–2	0–2
Ludogorets Razgrad (Bulgaria)	2–2 (a)	(Serbia) Partizan	0–0	2–2
League Route
AEL Limassol (Cyprus)	1–3	(Russia) Zenit Saint Petersburg	1–0	0–3
Dnipro Dnipropetrovsk (Ukraine)	0–2	(Denmark) Copenhagen	0–0	0–2
Feyenoord (Netherlands)	2–5	(Turkey) Beşiktaş	1–2	1–3
Grasshopper (Switzerland)	1–3	(France) Lille	0–2	1–1
Standard Liège (Belgium)	2–1	(Greece) Panathinaikos	0–0	2–1

== Play-off round ==
The play-off round was split into two separate sections: one for champions (Champions Route) and one for non-champions (League Route). The losing teams in both sections entered the 2014–15 UEFA Europa League group stage.

The draw for the play-off round was held on 8 August 2014. The first legs were played on 19 and 20 August, and the second legs were played on 26 and 27 August 2014.

Team 1	Agg.	Team 2	1st leg	2nd leg
Champions Route
Maribor (Slovenia)	2–1	(Scotland) Celtic	1–1	1–0
Red Bull Salzburg (Austria)	2–4	(Sweden) Malmö FF	2–1	0–3
AaB (Denmark)	1–5	(Cyprus) APOEL	1–1	0–4
Steaua București (Romania)	1–1 (5–6 p)	(Bulgaria) Ludogorets Razgrad	1–0	0–1 (a.e.t.)
Slovan Bratislava (Slovakia)	1–4	(Belarus) BATE Borisov	1–1	0–3
League Route
Beşiktaş (Turkey)	0–1	(England) Arsenal	0–0	0–1
Standard Liège (Belgium)	0–4	(Russia) Zenit Saint Petersburg	0–1	0–3
Copenhagen (Denmark)	2–7	(Germany) Bayer Leverkusen	2–3	0–4
Lille (France)	0–3	(Portugal) Porto	0–1	0–2
Napoli (Italy)	2–4	(Spain) Athletic Bilbao	1–1	1–3

== Group stage ==
Location of teams of the 2014–15 UEFA Champions League group stage.
Brown: Group A; Red: Group B; Orange: Group C; Yellow: Group D;
Green: Group E; Blue: Group F; Purple: Group G; Pink: Group H.

The draw for the group stage was held in Monaco on 28 August 2014. The 32 teams were allocated into four pots based on their 2014 UEFA club coefficients, with the title holders being placed in Pot 1 automatically. They were drawn into eight groups of four, with the restriction that teams from the same association could not be drawn against each other.

In each group, teams played against each other home-and-away in a round-robin format. The matchdays were 16–17 September, 30 September–1 October, 21–22 October, 4–5 November, 25–26 November, and 9–10 December 2014.

A total of 18 national associations were represented in the group stage. Ludogorets Razgrad and Malmö FF made their debut appearances in the group stage. For the first time since the 1995–96 season, England's Manchester United did not qualify for the group stage.

Teams that qualified for the group stage also participated in the 2014–15 UEFA Youth League, a competition available to players aged 19 or under.

The group winners and runners-up advanced to the round of 16, while the third-placed teams entered the 2014–15 UEFA Europa League round of 32. See 2014–15 UEFA Champions League group stage for tiebreakers if two or more teams are equal on points.

=== Group A ===
Pos	Team	Pld	W	D	L	GF	GA	GD	Pts	Qualification	ATM	JUV	OLY	MAL
1	(Spain) Atlético Madrid	6	4	1	1	14	3	+11	13	Advance to knockout phase	—	1–0	4–0	5–0
2	(Italy) Juventus	6	3	1	2	7	4	+3	10	Advance to knockout phase	0–0	—	3–2	2–0
3	(Greece) Olympiacos	6	3	0	3	10	13	−3	9	Transfer to Europa League	3–2	1–0	—	4–2
4	(Sweden) Malmö FF	6	1	0	5	4	15	−11	3		0–2	0–2	2–0	—

Source: UEFA

=== Group B ===
Pos	Team	Pld	W	D	L	GF	GA	GD	Pts	Qualification	RMA	BSL	LIV	LUD
1	(Spain) Real Madrid	6	6	0	0	16	2	+14	18	Advance to knockout phase	—	5–1	1–0	4–0
2	(Switzerland) Basel	6	2	1	3	7	8	−1	7	Advance to knockout phase	0–1	—	1–0	4–0
3	(England) Liverpool	6	1	2	3	5	9	−4	5	Transfer to Europa League	0–3	1–1	—	2–1
4	(Bulgaria) Ludogorets Razgrad	6	1	1	4	5	14	−9	4		1–2	1–0	2–2	—

Source: UEFA

=== Group C ===
Pos	Team	Pld	W	D	L	GF	GA	GD	Pts	Qualification	MON	LEV	ZEN	BEN
1	(France) Monaco	6	3	2	1	4	1	+3	11	Advance to knockout phase	—	1–0	2–0	0–0
2	(Germany) Bayer Leverkusen	6	3	1	2	7	4	+3	10	Advance to knockout phase	0–1	—	2–0	3–1
3	(Russia) Zenit Saint Petersburg	6	2	1	3	4	6	−2	7	Transfer to Europa League	0–0	1–2	—	1–0
4	(Portugal) Benfica	6	1	2	3	2	6	−4	5		1–0	0–0	0–2	—

Source: UEFA

=== Group D ===
Pos	Team	Pld	W	D	L	GF	GA	GD	Pts	Qualification	DOR	ARS	AND	GAL
1	(Germany) Borussia Dortmund	6	4	1	1	14	4	+10	13	Advance to knockout phase	—	2–0	1–1	4–1
2	(England) Arsenal	6	4	1	1	15	8	+7	13	Advance to knockout phase	2–0	—	3–3	4–1
3	(Belgium) Anderlecht	6	1	3	2	8	10	−2	6	Transfer to Europa League	0–3	1–2	—	2–0
4	(Turkey) Galatasaray	6	0	1	5	4	19	−15	1		0–4	1–4	1–1	—

Source: UEFA

=== Group E ===
Pos	Team	Pld	W	D	L	GF	GA	GD	Pts	Qualification	BAY	MCI	ROM	CSKA
1	(Germany) Bayern Munich	6	5	0	1	16	4	+12	15	Advance to knockout phase	—	1–0	2–0	3–0
2	(England) Manchester City	6	2	2	2	9	8	+1	8	Advance to knockout phase	3–2	—	1–1	1–2
3	(Italy) Roma	6	1	2	3	8	14	−6	5	Transfer to Europa League	1–7	0–2	—	5–1
4	(Russia) CSKA Moscow	6	1	2	3	6	13	−7	5		0–1	2–2	1–1	—

Source: UEFA

=== Group F ===
Pos	Team	Pld	W	D	L	GF	GA	GD	Pts	Qualification	BAR	PAR	AJX	APO
1	(Spain) Barcelona	6	5	0	1	15	5	+10	15	Advance to knockout phase	—	3–1	3–1	1–0
2	(France) Paris Saint-Germain	6	4	1	1	10	7	+3	13	Advance to knockout phase	3–2	—	3–1	1–0
3	(Netherlands) Ajax	6	1	2	3	8	10	−2	5	Transfer to Europa League	0–2	1–1	—	4–0
4	(Cyprus) APOEL	6	0	1	5	1	12	−11	1		0–4	0–1	1–1	—

Source: UEFA

=== Group G ===
Pos	Team	Pld	W	D	L	GF	GA	GD	Pts	Qualification	CHE	SCH	SPO	MRB
1	(England) Chelsea	6	4	2	0	17	3	+14	14	Advance to knockout phase	—	1–1	3–1	6–0
2	(Germany) Schalke 04	6	2	2	2	9	14	−5	8	Advance to knockout phase	0–5	—	4–3	1–1
3	(Portugal) Sporting CP	6	2	1	3	12	12	0	7	Transfer to Europa League	0–1	4–2	—	3–1
4	(Slovenia) Maribor	6	0	3	3	4	13	−9	3		1–1	0–1	1–1	—

Source: UEFA

=== Group H ===
Pos	Team	Pld	W	D	L	GF	GA	GD	Pts	Qualification	POR	SHK	ATH	BATE
1	(Portugal) Porto	6	4	2	0	16	4	+12	14	Advance to knockout phase	—	1–1	2–1	6–0
2	(Ukraine) Shakhtar Donetsk	6	2	3	1	15	4	+11	9	Advance to knockout phase	2–2	—	0–1	5–0
3	(Spain) Athletic Bilbao	6	2	1	3	5	6	−1	7	Transfer to Europa League	0–2	0–0	—	2–0
4	(Belarus) BATE Borisov	6	1	0	5	2	24	−22	3		0–3	0–7	2–1	—

Source: UEFA

== Knockout phase ==
In the knockout phase, teams played against each other over two legs on a home-and-away basis, except for the one-match final. The mechanism of the draws for each round was as follows:

- In the draw for the round of 16, the eight group winners were seeded, and the eight group runners-up were unseeded. The seeded teams were drawn against the unseeded teams, with the seeded teams hosting the second leg. Teams from the same group or the same association could not be drawn against each other.
- In the draws for the quarter-finals onwards, there were no seedings, and teams from the same group or the same association could be drawn against each other.

=== Bracket ===
Round of 16
(Italy) Juventus	2	3	5
(Germany) Borussia Dortmund	1	0	1
(England) Arsenal	1	2	3
(France) Monaco (a)	3	0	3
(Germany) Bayer Leverkusen	1	0	1 (2)
(Spain) Atlético Madrid (p)	0	1	1 (3)
(Germany) Schalke 04	0	4	4
(Spain) Real Madrid	2	3	5
(France) Paris Saint-Germain (a.e.t.; a)	1	2	3
(England) Chelsea	1	2	3
(England) Manchester City	1	0	1
(Spain) Barcelona	2	1	3
(Switzerland) Basel	1	0	1
(Portugal) Porto	1	4	5
(Ukraine) Shakhtar Donetsk	0	0	0
(Germany) Bayern Munich	0	7	7

Quarter-finals
(Italy) Juventus	1	0	1
(France) Monaco	0	0	0
(Spain) Atlético Madrid	0	0	0
(Spain) Real Madrid	0	1	1
(France) Paris Saint-Germain	1	0	1
(Spain) Barcelona	3	2	5
(Portugal) Porto	3	1	4
(Germany) Bayern Munich	1	6	7

Semi-finals
(Italy) Juventus	2	1	3
(Spain) Real Madrid	1	1	2
(Spain) Barcelona	3	2	5
(Germany) Bayern Munich	0	3	3

Final
6 June – Berlin
(Italy) Juventus	1
(Spain) Barcelona	3

=== Round of 16 ===
The draw for the round of 16 was held on 15 December 2014. The first legs were played on 17, 18, 24 and 25 February, and the second legs were played on 10, 11, 17 and 18 March 2015.

Team 1	Agg.	Team 2	1st leg	2nd leg
Paris Saint-Germain (France)	3–3 (a)	(England) Chelsea	1–1	2–2 (a.e.t.)
Manchester City (England)	1–3	(Spain) Barcelona	1–2	0–1
Bayer Leverkusen (Germany)	1–1 (2–3 p)	(Spain) Atlético Madrid	1–0	0–1 (a.e.t.)
Juventus (Italy)	5–1	(Germany) Borussia Dortmund	2–1	3–0
Schalke 04 (Germany)	4–5	(Spain) Real Madrid	0–2	4–3
Shakhtar Donetsk (Ukraine)	0–7	(Germany) Bayern Munich	0–0	0–7
Arsenal (England)	3–3 (a)	(France) Monaco	1–3	2–0
Basel (Switzerland)	1–5	(Portugal) Porto	1–1	0–4

=== Quarter-finals ===
The draw for the quarter-finals was held on 20 March 2015. The first legs were played on 14 and 15 April, and the second legs were played on 21 and 22 April 2015.

Team 1	Agg.	Team 2	1st leg	2nd leg
Paris Saint-Germain (France)	1–5	(Spain) Barcelona	1–3	0–2
Atlético Madrid (Spain)	0–1	(Spain) Real Madrid	0–0	0–1
Porto (Portugal)	4–7	(Germany) Bayern Munich	3–1	1–6
Juventus (Italy)	1–0	(France) Monaco	1–0	0–0

=== Semi-finals ===
The draw for the semi-finals and final (to determine the "home" team for administrative purposes) was held on 24 April 2015. The first legs were played on 5 and 6 May, and the second legs were played on 12 and 13 May 2015.

Team 1	Agg.	Team 2	1st leg	2nd leg
Barcelona (Spain)	5–3	(Germany) Bayern Munich	3–0	2–3
Juventus (Italy)	3–2	(Spain) Real Madrid	2–1	1–1

=== Final ===
The final was played on 6 June 2015 at the Olympiastadion in Berlin, Germany. The "home" team (for administrative purposes) was determined by an additional draw held after the semi-final draw.

6 June 2015
20:45 UTC+2

Juventus (Italy)	1–3	(Spain) Barcelona
Morata 55'	Report	Rakitić 4'; Suárez 68'; Neymar 90+7'

Olympiastadion, Berlin
Attendance: 70,442
Referee: Cüneyt Çakır (Turkey)

== Statistics ==
Statistics exclude qualifying rounds and play-off round.

=== Top goalscorers ===
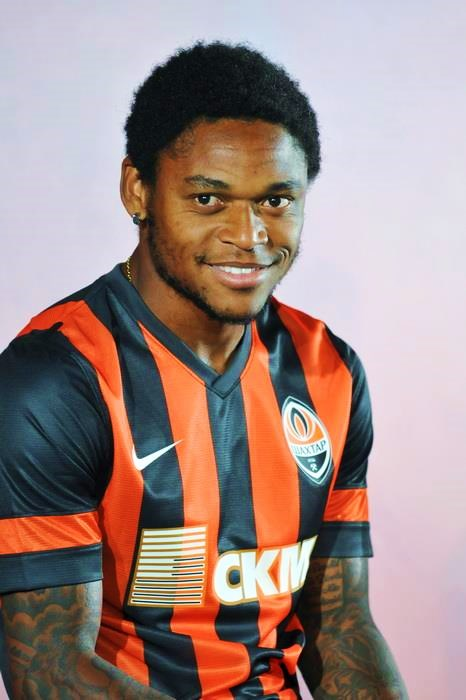
Shakhtar's Luiz Adriano became the first player to score hat-tricks in consecutive Champions League group stage games, both against BATE Borisov.

Rank	Player	Team	Goals	Minutes played
1	(Brazil) Neymar	(Spain) Barcelona	10	1,026
1	(Portugal) Cristiano Ronaldo	(Spain) Real Madrid	10	1,065
1	(Argentina) Lionel Messi	(Spain) Barcelona	10	1,147
4	(Brazil) Luiz Adriano	(Ukraine) Shakhtar Donetsk	9	628
5	(Colombia) Jackson Martínez	(Portugal) Porto	7	629
5	(Germany) Thomas Müller	(Germany) Bayern Munich	7	777
5	(Uruguay) Luis Suárez	(Spain) Barcelona	7	827
5	(Argentina) Carlos Tevez	(Italy) Juventus	7	1,156
9	(Argentina) Sergio Agüero	(England) Manchester City	6	550
9	(France) Karim Benzema	(Spain) Real Madrid	6	664
9	(Uruguay) Edinson Cavani	(France) Paris Saint-Germain	6	920
9	(Poland) Robert Lewandowski	(Germany) Bayern Munich	6	932

=== Top assists ===
Rank	Player	Team	Assists	Minutes played
1	(Argentina) Lionel Messi	(Spain) Barcelona	6	1,147
2	(Spain) Andrés Iniesta	(Spain) Barcelona	5	786
3	(Germany) Bastian Schweinsteiger	(Germany) Bayern Munich	4	456
3	(Spain) Cesc Fàbregas	(England) Chelsea	4	696
3	(Spain) Koke	(Spain) Atlético Madrid	4	833
3	(Brazil) Dani Alves	(Spain) Barcelona	4	961
3	(Portugal) Cristiano Ronaldo	(Spain) Real Madrid	4	1,065

=== Squad of the season ===
The UEFA technical study group selected the following 18 players as the squad of the tournament:

Pos.	Player	Team
GK	(Italy) Gianluigi Buffon	(Italy) Juventus
GK	(Germany) Marc-André ter Stegen	(Spain) Barcelona
DF	(Spain) Gerard Piqué	(Spain) Barcelona
DF	(Argentina) Javier Mascherano	(Spain) Barcelona
DF	(Spain) Jordi Alba	(Spain) Barcelona
DF	(Serbia) Branislav Ivanović	(England) Chelsea
DF	(Italy) Giorgio Chiellini	(Italy) Juventus
MF	(Spain) Sergio Busquets	(Spain) Barcelona
MF	(Spain) Andrés Iniesta	(Spain) Barcelona
MF	(Germany) Toni Kroos	(Spain) Real Madrid
MF	(Croatia) Ivan Rakitić	(Spain) Barcelona
MF	(Italy) Andrea Pirlo	(Italy) Juventus
MF	(Italy) Claudio Marchisio	(Italy) Juventus
FW	(Argentina) Lionel Messi	(Spain) Barcelona
FW	(Brazil) Neymar	(Spain) Barcelona
FW	(Uruguay) Luis Suárez	(Spain) Barcelona
FW	(Spain) Álvaro Morata	(Italy) Juventus
FW	(Portugal) Cristiano Ronaldo	(Spain) Real Madrid

== See also ==
- 2014–15 UEFA Europa League
- 2015 UEFA Super Cup
- 2015 FIFA Club World Cup
- 2014–15 UEFA Women's Champions League
- 2014–15 UEFA Youth League
