= René Tórgarð =

Faroese footballer

Personal information
- Full name: René Tórgarð
- Date of birth: 3 August 1979 (age 47)
- Place of birth: Tórshavn, Faroe Islands
- Height: 1.85 m (6 ft 1 in)
- Position: Goalkeeper

Team information
- Current team: EB/Streymur
- Number: 1

Senior career*
Years	Team	Apps	(Gls)
2001–2004	B36 Tórshavn	68	(0)
2005	AB Argir	6	(0)
2005–	EB/Streymur	193	(0)

International career^{‡}
2008–	Faroe Islands	3	(0)
- * Club domestic league appearances and goals as of 5 July 2013 ‡ National team caps and goals as of 5 July 2013

René Tórgarð (born 3 August 1979) is a Faroese international footballer who plays club football for EB/Streymur, as a goalkeeper.

He made his international debut for the Faroe Islands in 2008.
