= Levi Hanssen =

Footballer (born 1988)

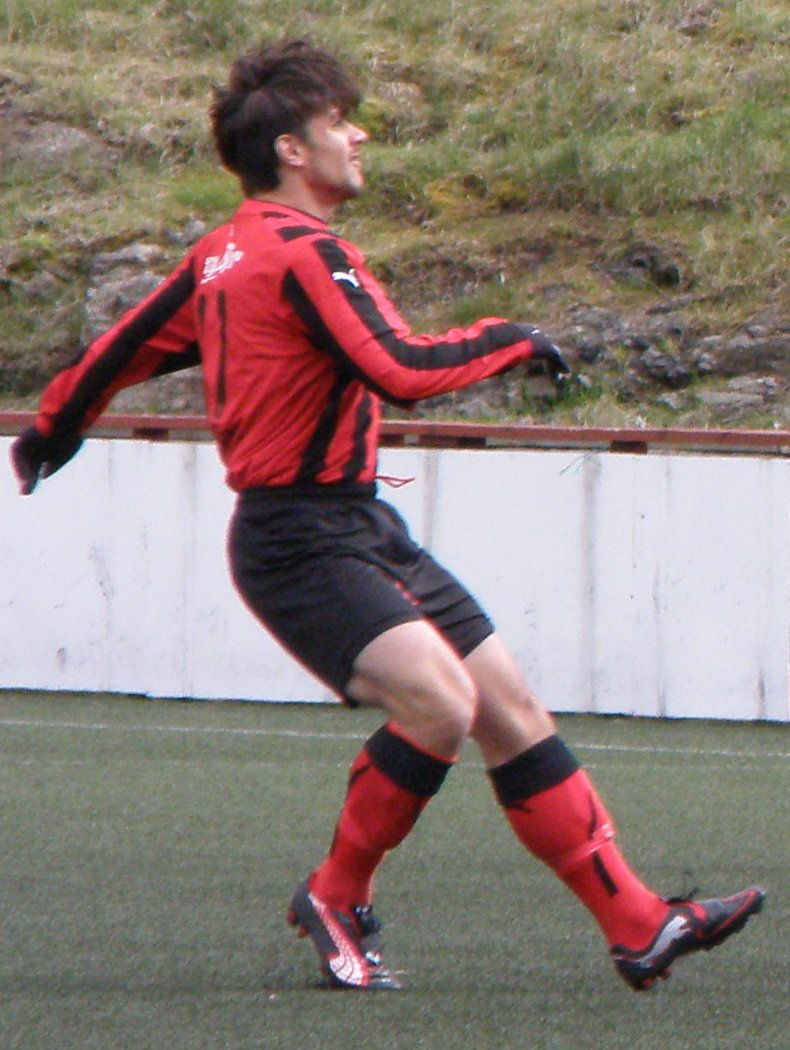
- Hanssen while playing for HB Tórshavn

Personal information
- Date of birth: 24 February 1988 (age 38)
- Place of birth: Wellington, New Zealand
- Height: 1.73 m (5 ft 8 in)
- Positions: Midfielder; forward

Senior career*
Years	Team	Apps	(Gls)
2004–2005	B36 Tórshavn	33	(5)
2006–2007	Skála ÍF	88	(5)
2008–2010	EB/Streymur	69	(7)
2010–2011	HB Tórshavn	31	(2)
2011–2013	EB/Streymur	50	(12)
2014–	HB Tórshavn	63	(7)
Total		334	(38)

International career
2004	Faroe Islands U17	7	(1)
2005–2006	Faroe Islands U19	6	(1)
2007–2008	Faroe Islands U21	7	(1)
2009–2010	Faroe Islands	3	(0)
- * Club domestic league appearances and goals

Levi Hanssen (born 24 February 1988) is a former professional footballer who played as a midfielder and forward.

Born in New Zealand, Hanssen grew up in Tórshavn, Faroe Islands.

He played for EB/Streymur, B36 Tórshavn and Skála ÍF. He was capped at full international level by the Faroe Islands with three matches. He has also played for Faroe Islands U21, U19 and U17.
